= Lemonade (album) =

2016 studio album by Beyoncé

Studio album by Beyoncé
- Released: April 23, 2016
- Recorded: 2014–2016
- Studios: Apex; Mad Decent (Burbank, California); The Beehive; Conway Recording; Henson Recording; Record Plant (Los Angeles); Jungle City (New York City); Larrabee; Mirrorball; Pacifique Recording (North Hollywood, Los Angeles); Skip Saylor (Northridge, Los Angeles)
- Genres: Art pop; R&B
- Length: 45:45
- Labels: Parkwood; Columbia
- Producers: Beyoncé; Diplo; Kevin Garrett; Jeremy McDonald; Ezra Koenig; Jack White; MeLo-X; Diana Gordon; Boots; DannyBoyStyles; Ben Billions; Mike Dean; Vincent Berry II; James Blake; Jonathan Coffer; Just Blaze; Mike Will Made It

Beyoncé chronology
Beyoncé (2013)	Lemonade (2016)	Everything Is Love (2018)

Singles from Lemonade
- 1. "Formation" Released: February 6, 2016; 2. "Sorry" Released: May 3, 2016; 3. "Hold Up" Released: May 27, 2016; 4. "Freedom" Released: September 9, 2016; 5. "All Night" Released: December 2, 2016

Lemonade is the sixth studio album by the American singer and songwriter Beyoncé. It was surprise-released on April 23, 2016, by Parkwood Entertainment and Columbia Records, as a visual album together with a film of the same name. Beyoncé conceived Lemonade as a concept album that explores the historical Black female experience in the United States, allegorized as a personal journey through marital betrayal and healing, and structured as a song cycle based on the Kübler-Ross model.

Categorized by critics as an eclectic, genre-blending album with avant-garde and art pop elements, Lemonade explores a variety of genres including R&B, rock, country, soul, blues, hip-hop, jazz, reggae, pop, gospel, and funk. It features guest vocals from Jack White, the Weeknd, James Blake and Kendrick Lamar. Upon release, it topped charts and received platinum and multiplatinum certifications in several countries across Europe, the Americas, and Asia–Pacific, and became the world's best-selling album of the year. The album was supported by five singles and promoted through a series of televised performances, as well as the Formation World Tour—the first all-stadium tour by a female artist.

Lemonade was hailed as an instant classic upon release and has since been named one of the greatest albums of all time. Critics commended the experimental post-genre production and nuanced vocal performance, with particular praise for Beyoncé's raw vulnerability and bold socio-political messaging. It was music critics' top album of 2016 according to the BBC, was named the greatest album of the 2010s decade by publications such as the Associated Press, and topped Rolling Stone's Greatest Albums of the 21st Century list. One of the most Grammy-nominated albums in history, Lemonade won Best Urban Contemporary Album and Best Music Video at the 59th Grammy Awards. It also won a Peabody Award in Entertainment at the 76th Annual Peabody Awards and received four nominations at the 68th Primetime Emmy Awards.

Lemonade is considered a cultural phenomenon, sparking widespread discourse on its personal revelations and socio-political commentary. It had a significant impact on the entertainment industry, inspiring other musicians and visual artists, and ignited trends across music, fashion and pop culture. The album has also been the subject of extensive analysis in academic journals, college courses, books, and museum exhibitions.

== Background ==
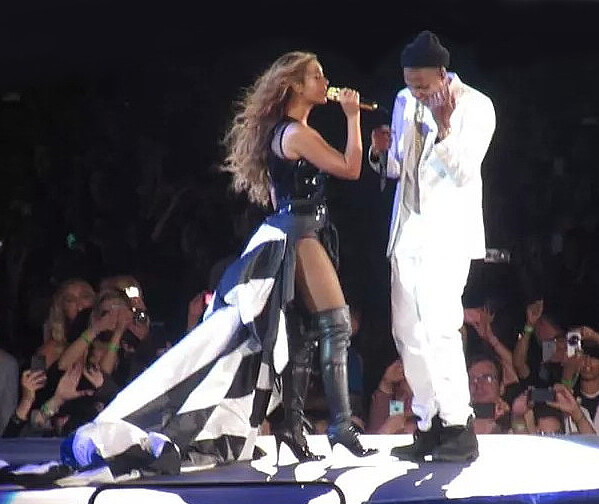
Beyoncé performing with Jay-Z at the On the Run Tour (2014), amid rumors of marriage issues.

Beyoncé's career took a transformative turn with the release of her fifth studio album, eponymously titled Beyoncé (2013). The album received widespread commercial and critical success, and its innovative surprise-release and visual format influenced how music is released in the digital age. This marked a significant shift in her public image, elevating her from a leading pop star to an auteur who defied industry conventions.

The following year, her personal life became a subject of public scrutiny after rumors spread of her husband Jay-Z's infidelity. This was fueled by a widely publicized incident at the 2014 Met Gala, where leaked elevator footage showed Beyoncé's sister Solange physically attacking Jay-Z. The family released a joint statement assuaging concerns, and while divorce rumors continued throughout Beyoncé and Jay-Z's joint On the Run Tour (2014), the couple presented a unified front.

On February 6, 2016, Beyoncé released the song "Formation" as a free download via music streaming service Tidal, accompanied by an unlisted music video on YouTube. The track, which blended trap and bounce, saw Beyoncé celebrate her culture, identity, and success as a black woman from the Southern United States. The song and video were met with widespread acclaim, with critics praising the release as a personal and political ode to black Southern heritage. Beyoncé performed the song a day after its release as part of a guest appearance during the Super Bowl 50 halftime show. A commercial aired after the performance announcing the Formation World Tour, with presales opening two days later. While the performance received positive reviews from fans and critics, it was met with backlash, boycotts, and protests from some conservative figures and law enforcement organizations over perceived anti-police, anti-American, and anti-white racist messages.

In an interview with Elle, published on April 4, 2016, Beyoncé was asked what she wanted to accomplish with the next phase of her career. She shared her desire to produce work that promoted healing and transformation, saying:

"I hope I can create art that helps people heal. Art that makes people feel proud of their struggle. Everyone experiences pain, but sometimes you need to be uncomfortable to transform. Pain is not pretty, but I wasn't able to hold my daughter in my arms until I experienced the pain of childbirth!"

== Recording and production ==
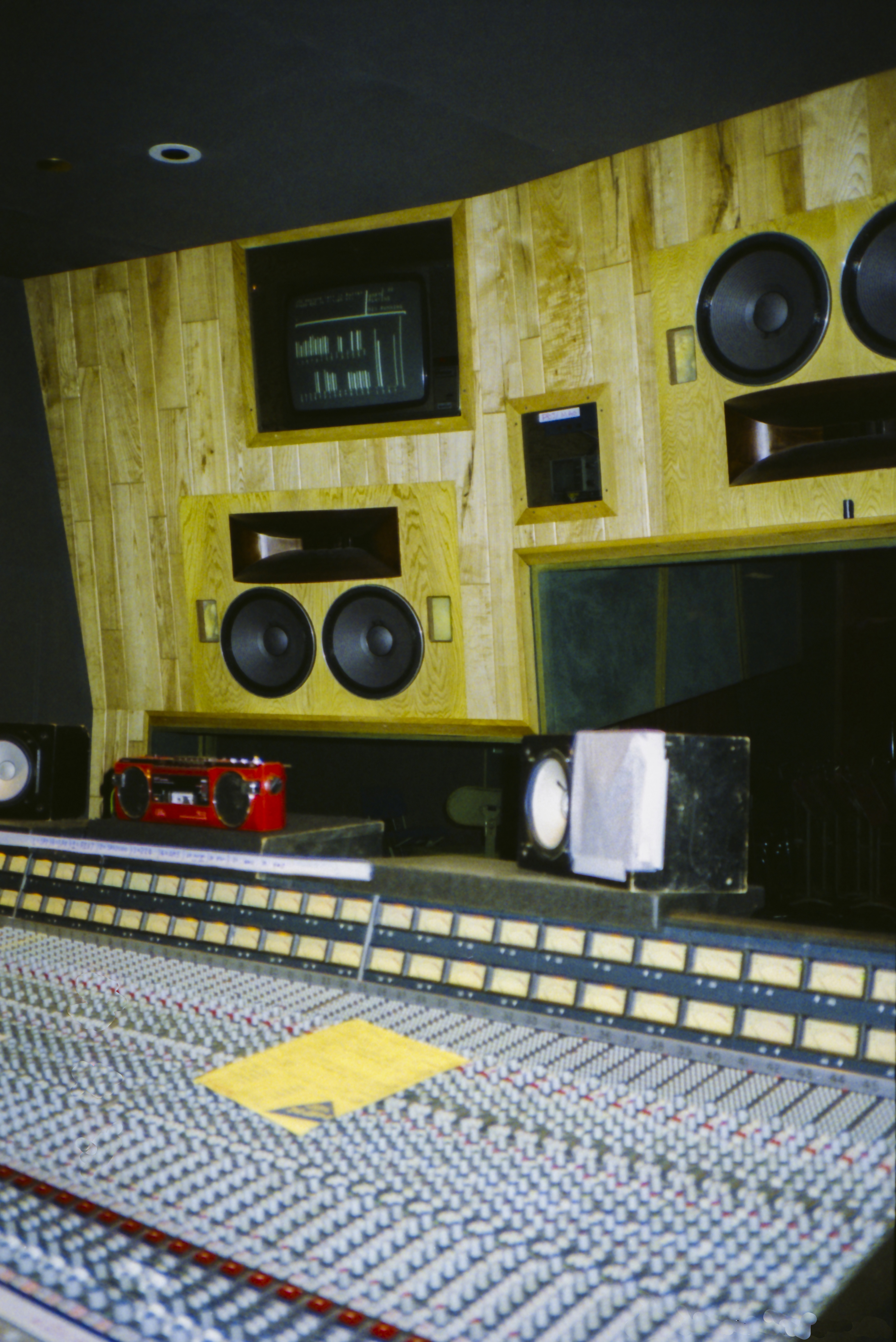
Early sessions for the album took place at the Record Plant in Los Angeles.

Lemonade was recorded between June 2014 and July 2015 across 11 studios in the United States. Beyoncé had the idea to write each song corresponding to a specific emotion that would form the chapters of the album and film, and posted mood boards around the studio representing each chapter to provide direction to her collaborators. Beyoncé and her collaborators also played music in the studio to inspire each other. The album was written in stages, with Beyoncé retreating to her home to work on the recordings with recording and mixing engineer Stuart White, as well as to take care of her daughter. The process began at the Record Plant in Los Angeles, which the team used for a month. They then took a break, and later went to Paris for 45 days. The team stayed in a hotel and set up two studios in two different hotel rooms, one for Beyoncé and one for Jay-Z. Jay-Z recounted how he and Beyoncé recorded music both separately and together, describing it as "using our art almost like a therapy session" after his infidelity. The music that Beyoncé recorded separately was what became Lemonade and was released first.

Lemonade was produced through Beyoncé's synthesis of the work of many collaborators, including both popular and lesser-known artists. Beyoncé oversaw all aspects of the writing and production process; co-writers MNEK and Jonny Coffer noted that she had a clear vision for how the songs should sound, consistently offering direction and suggestions to guide the creative process. The songs were developed in a piecemeal fashion, with Beyoncé combining material that she had written herself with elements from other writers. Collaborator MeLo-X described Beyoncé's production style as highly distinctive, saying: "She has a way of creating that I've never seen before as an artist. She produces, alters and arranges tracks in ways I wouldn't think of."

== Themes ==
We all experience pain and loss, and often we become inaudible. My intention for the film and album was to create a body of work that would give a voice to our pain, our struggles, our darkness and our history. To confront issues that make us uncomfortable. It's important to me to show images to my children that reflect their beauty, so they can grow up in a world where they look in the mirror, first through their own families — as well as the news, the Super Bowl, the Olympics, the White House and the Grammys — and see themselves, and have no doubt that they're beautiful, intelligent and capable. This is something I want for every child of every race. And I feel it's vital that we learn from the past and recognize our tendencies to repeat our mistakes.

— Beyoncé during her acceptance speech for the 2017 Grammy Award for Best Urban Contemporary Album

=== Jay Z ===
As a multimedia audiovisual artwork, Lemonade relates the emotional journey of Beyoncé after Jay-Z's infidelity in a generational and racial context through its music, lyrics, visuals and poetry. The Lemonade album is a song cycle (referencing the classical compositional genre defined in German Lieder by Robert Schumann, Franz Schubert and Johannes Brahms) that is performed as an elaboration of the Kübler-Ross model, with the tracks (excluding "Formation") corresponding to the eleven chapters of the Lemonade film: "Intuition", "Denial", "Anger", "Apathy", "Emptiness", "Accountability", "Reformation", "Forgiveness", "Resurrection", "Hope", and "Redemption".

Melina Matsoukas, the director of the "Formation" music video, said that Beyoncé explained to her the concept behind Lemonade, stating: "She wanted to show the historical impact of slavery on black love, and what it has done to the black family, and black men and women—how we're almost socialized not to be together." Beyoncé wrote on this in a 2018 Vogue article about the "generational curses" in her family, explaining that she comes "from a lineage of broken male-female relationships, abuse of power, and mistrust", including a slave owner who married a slave. Beyoncé continues, writing "Only when I saw that clearly was I able to resolve those conflicts in my own relationship. Connecting to the past and knowing our history makes us both bruised and beautiful."

This theme recurs throughout Lemonade, with Beyoncé's grief, trauma and struggle being connected to that of her family's ancestors. The sixth track "Daddy Lessons" acts as a turning point for the album, as Beyoncé links Jay-Z's infidelity with her father Mathew Knowles's infidelity to her mother Tina. Toward the end of Lemonade, Beyoncé reveals the meaning behind the title, showing Jay-Z's grandmother Hattie White saying "I had my ups and downs, but I always find the inner strength to pull myself up. I was served lemons, but I made lemonade", and describing her own grandmother, Agnez Deréon, as an "alchemist" who "spun gold out of this hard life" with the instructions to overcome these challenges passed down through generations like a lemonade recipe.

=== Black feminism ===
Miriam Bale for Billboard called Lemonade "a revolutionary work of Black feminism" as "a movie made by a black woman, starring Black women, and for Black women", in which Beyoncé is seen gathering, uniting and leading Black women throughout the film. In addition to relating the story of Beyoncé's relationship with her husband, Lemonade also chronicles the relationship between Black women and American society. This includes how the United States betrayed and continually mistreats Black women, with society needing to solve its problems in order to enable reform and support the rehabilitation of Black women. As part of reverting the societal oppression and silencing of Black women, Lemonade centers the experiences of Black women in a way that is not often seen in the media, and celebrates their achievements despite the adversity they face.

"Don't Hurt Yourself" contains a quote from Malcolm X in which he said "The most disrespected person in America is the Black woman. The most unprotected person in America is the Black woman. The most neglected person in America is the Black woman". The Black female public figures whom Beyoncé featured in the film all have successful careers despite having experienced misogynoir and racism in the media. The film also contains clips of everyday Black women from working class communities, bringing visibility to Black women who are often ignored and undermined by society. The film envisions a space where there was never oppression of Black women, in which Beyoncé and other Black women form a self-sufficient community in which they can heal together. Lemonade also defies and dismantles stereotypical representations of Black women as monolithic and angry Black women, instead granting them complexity, agency, strength and vulnerability.

To create Lemonade, Beyoncé drew from the work of a wide variety of Black women who are often overlooked or forgotten. The music draws inspiration from Black female blues musicians such as Shug Avery, Bessie Smith and Sister Rosetta Tharpe, who also used their personal trauma to empower Black women, and samples songs originally recorded by Black women, namely Memphis Minnie and Dionne Warwick, but whose most famous recordings are by male or white artists. These musical references situate Lemonade within the broader tradition of blues women who used their art to voice Black women's emotional experiences and social realities. The visuals drew inspiration from works by Black feminists such as Julie Dash's Daughters Of The Dust, Alice Walker's In Search Of Our Mothers' Gardens, and Toni Morrison's The Bluest Eye. Other influences for Lemonade include literary work by Black women focusing on themes including African-American folklore (such as Zora Neale Hurston's Their Eyes Were Watching God) and Afrofuturism (such as Octavia Butler's Kindred). Beyoncé specifically moves away from her typical music roots to develop a more communal spotlight on artistic hoodoo with other Black female creatives.

=== African-American culture ===
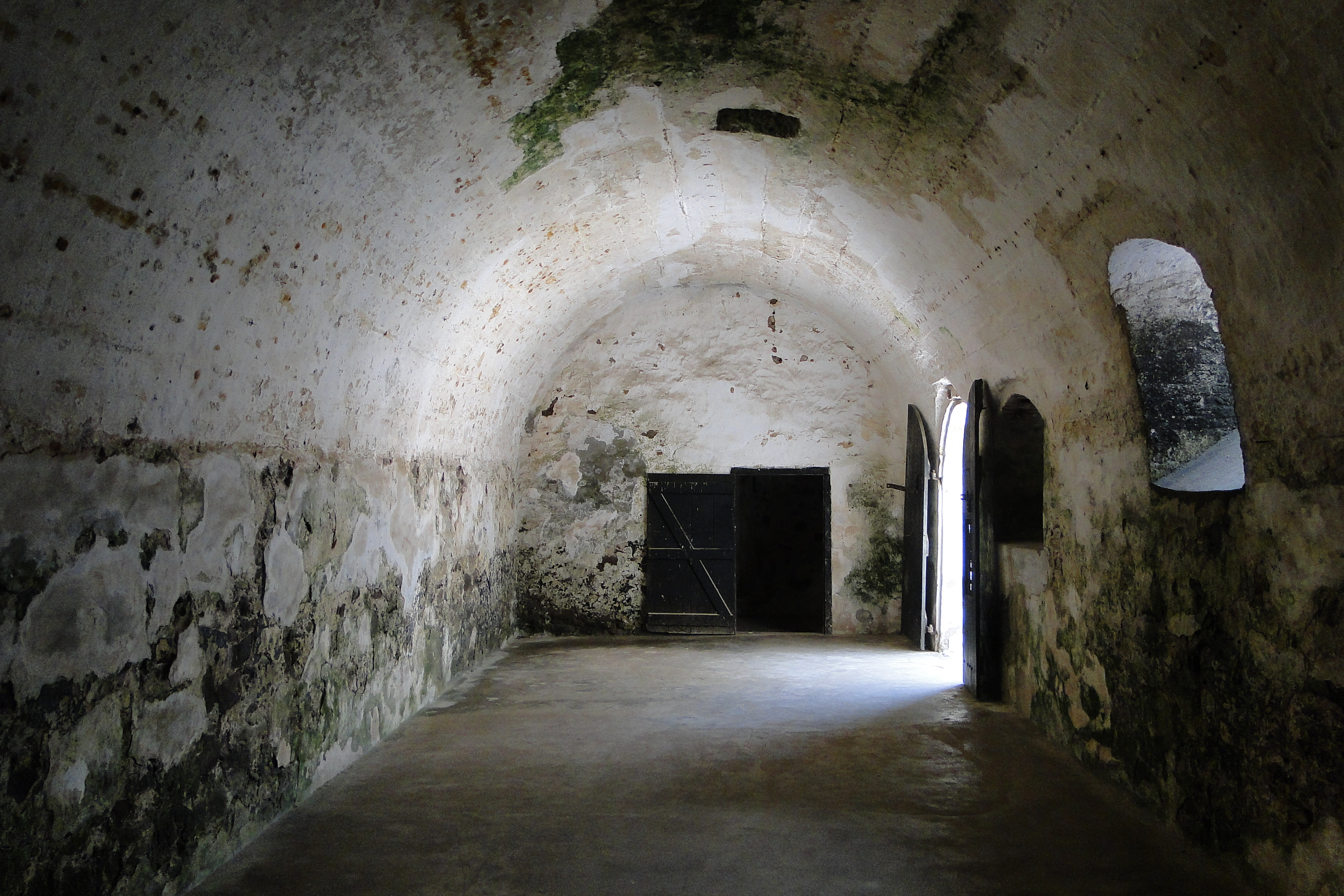
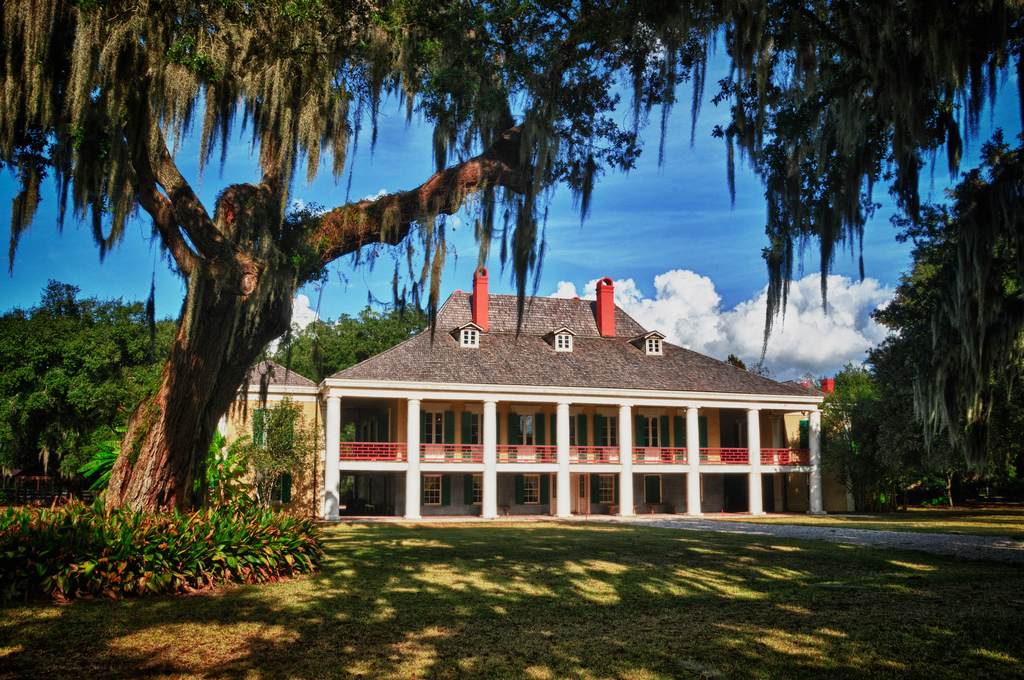
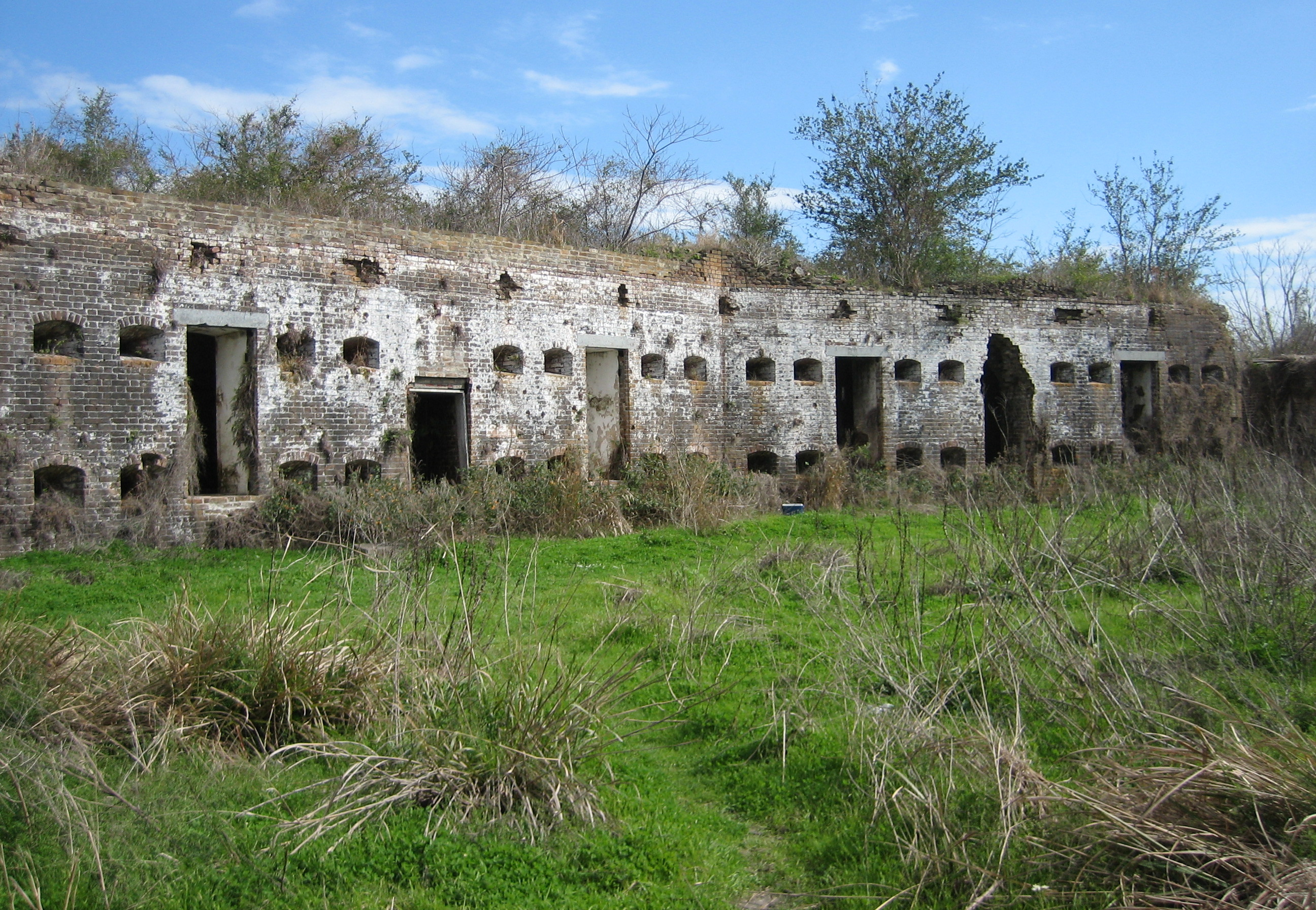
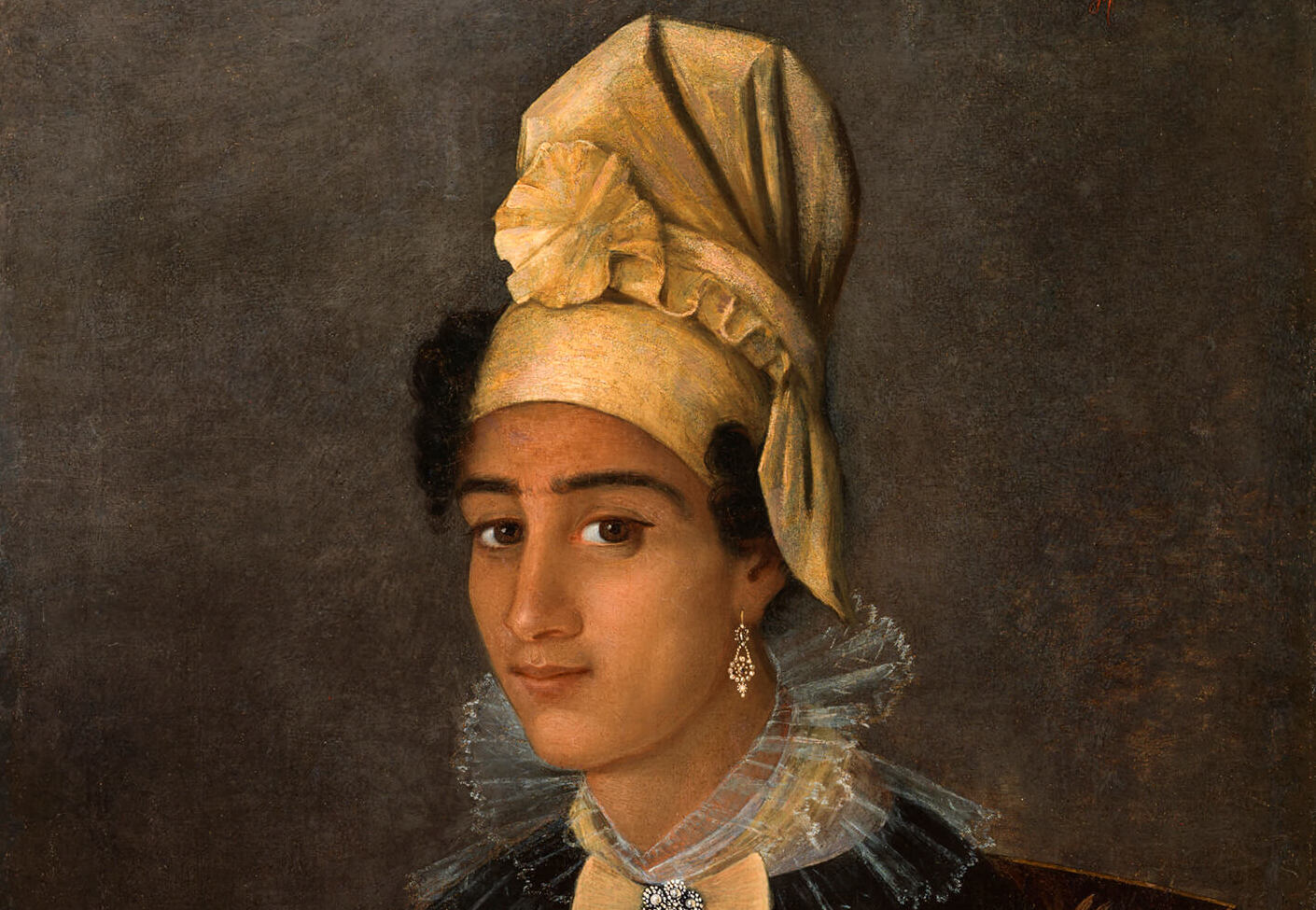
Lemonade contains many allusions to African-American history including, clockwise from top left, the slave cells of Elmina, Destrehan Plantation, the tignon law, and the Confederate stronghold Fort Macomb

Beyoncé also uses Lemonade as a form of recognition, commemoration and celebration of the culture and history of Black people in the Deep South and in the United States as a whole. The film contains allusions to slavery, such as the House of Slaves' Door of No Return in Senegal and the dungeons of Elmina Castle in Ghana, where slaves were taken before being shipped to the Americas. In "Love Drought", Beyoncé walks with her dancers into the sea, alluding to the Igbo Landing of 1803, where Igbo slaves took control of their slave ship, and rather than submit to slavery, marched into the sea while singing in Igbo, drowning themselves. Beyoncé appears wearing a tignon, in reference to Louisiana's tignon laws implemented in 1786 that limited African-American women's dress in order to maintain the state's racist social hierarchies. The film also contains references to African religion and spirituality, such as Yoruba ori body paint in "Sorry", allusions to the loa Erzulie Red-Eyes in "Don't Hurt Yourself", and Beyoncé's initiation into the Santería religion and embodiment of the Yoruba orisha Oshun in "Hold Up". Allusions to New Orleans culture include "Queen of Creole cuisine" Leah Chase, the Edna Karr Marching Band, jazz funerals, Mardi Gras Indians and the Superdome.

Beyoncé is seen with other Black women on plantations in Lemonade. In the "Formation" video, the walls of the plantation houses are covered with French Renaissance-style portraits of Black subjects; director Melina Matsoukas states that "films about slavery traditionally feature white people in these roles of power and position. I wanted to turn those images on their head." Toward the end of Lemonade, Beyoncé and several Black women are on a plantation, with Chris Kelly for Fact writing "Instead of an antebellum memory, these scenes portray a dream: the fantasy of an all-Black, matriarchal utopia when women dress up, prepare meals, take photographs and perform shows, not for a master but for themselves." Throughout the film, Beyoncé can be seen in Fort Macomb, a Confederate States Army stronghold that was taken over by one of the first all-Black Union Army units – the 1st Louisiana Native Guard – and eventually destroyed by Hurricane Katrina. On the central track "Daddy Lessons", Beyoncé is seen standing in a hideaway in the fort, alluding to the Underground Railroad. However, on the closer "All Night", Beyoncé is seen above ground, walking on top of the ruins of the fort in an antebellum-style dress made in West African material, possibly inspired by artist Yinka Shonibare who is known for reclaiming "European import — the cloth — to remake symbols of European cultural dominance in the spirit of Africa".

On "Don't Hurt Yourself", Beyoncé samples Led Zeppelin's "When the Levee Breaks". However, the classic rock song was originally written by black Delta blues artists Kansas Joe McCoy and Memphis Minnie, with the song referring to the Great Mississippi Flood of 1927 which displaced hundreds of thousands of African Americans. With the sample, Beyoncé reclaims the song that was written by Black people about black history. More broadly, Beyoncé reclaims genres that were influenced by African Americans that are now seen as predominantly white genres on Lemonade, such as rock in "Don't Hurt Yourself" and country in "Daddy Lessons".

== Music and lyrics ==
Lemonade is an eclectic, genre-blending album that explores many musical styles. Vox's Alissa Wilkinson described it as an R&B-rock-country-soul album, with its other genres including blues, hip-hop, jazz, reggae, pop, gospel, and funk. The Nation's Erin Vanderhoof characterized the album as avant-garde, while Pitchfork's Marc Hogan called it an art pop album. Kariann Goldschmitt, music lecturer at the University of Cambridge, described the album's experimentation with musical styles as a "recuperative historiography" of African-American contributions to diverse genres of music.

Lemonade features musicians Jack White, Kendrick Lamar, and bassist Marcus Miller, and sampling from folk music collectors John Lomax, Sr. and his son Alan Lomax on "Freedom". Beyoncé and her team reference the musical memories of all those periods, including a brass band, stomping blues rock, ultra-slow avant-R&B, preaching, a prison song (both collected by John and Alan Lomax), and the sound of the 1960s fuzz-tone guitar psychedelia (sampling the Puerto Rican band Kaleidoscope). The Washington Post called the album a "surprisingly furious song cycle about infidelity and revenge". The Chicago Tribune described it as not just a mere grab for popular music dominance, rather it is a retrospective that allows the listener to explore Beyoncé's personal circumstances, with musical tones from the southern United States, a harkening back toward her formative years spent in Texas. AllMusic wrote that Beyoncé "delights in her Blackness, femininity, and Southern origin with supreme wordplay." On the album, Isaac Hayes and Andy Williams are among the sampled artists. PopMatters noticed how the album was nuanced in its theme of anger and betrayal with vast swathes of the album bathed in political context; however, it is still a pop album at its essence with darker and praiseworthy tones.

== Title and artwork ==
There are two suggested inspirations for the title. The song "Freedom" includes at its end an audio recording of Hattie White, grandmother of Beyoncé's husband Jay-Z's, telling a crowd at her ninetieth birthday party in December 2015: "I had my ups and downs, but I always find the inner strength to pull myself up. I was served lemons, but I made lemonade", referencing the proverb "when life gives you lemons, make lemonade" that encourages turning sourness and difficulty to something positive. Beyoncé also draws a connection to her own grandmother, Agnez Deréon, using her lemonade recipe that was passed down through the generations as a metaphor for the mechanisms for healing passed through generations.

The cover artwork for Lemonade is from the music video shot for "Don't Hurt Yourself" and features Beyoncé wearing cornrows and a fur coat, leaning against a Chevrolet Suburban and covering her face with her arm. The cover image has also been notes for its stark, minimalist style, which reflects the album's raw emotional themes. In 2023, Joe Lynch of Billboard ranked it the 99th best album cover of all time.

== Release and promotion ==
Lemonade was first made available for online streaming via Tidal on April 23, 2016, through Parkwood Entertainment and Columbia Records, and for digital download the following day. It was released for CD and DVD on May 6, 2016. A limited edition box set titled How to Make Lemonade was made available for pre-order on August 18, 2017, containing a six-hundred-page coffee table book, featuring a set of pictures and behind-the-scenes content showcasing the making of the album, and a double vinyl LP of Lemonade. Standalone vinyl was released on September 15, 2017. Lemonade was initially only available to stream on Tidal, but was added to other streaming platforms on April 23, 2019, exactly three years after its release. The version made available on other streaming services contains the original audio part of Lemonade as well as the original demo of "Sorry" as a bonus.

Beyoncé had a goal to perform the entire Lemonade album live. Beyoncé performed "Formation" at the Super Bowl 50 halftime show as part of her guest appearance at the event, with critics lauding the performance and stating that she stole the show from headliners Coldplay. The political symbolism in the performance also inspired many thinkpieces and discussions on their history and significance. Beyoncé performed "Freedom" with Kendrick Lamar as the surprise opening number at the 2016 BET Awards on June 27. The performance began with an audio clip of Martin Luther King Jr.'s "I Have a Dream" speech. The performance was met with acclaim by critics. At the 2016 MTV Video Music Awards on August 28, Beyoncé performed a sixteen-minute medley of "Pray You Catch Me", "Hold Up", "Sorry", "Don't Hurt Yourself", and "Formation", and included interludes of the poetry as heard in the Lemonade film. Critics noted that Beyoncé used political symbolism during "Pray You Catch Me", which included angel-like dancers in historical black hairstyles (such as Bantu knots, braids and dreadlocks) successively falling to the ground as though shot, alluding to police brutality, and a black man in a black hoodie catching, uplifting and pushing Beyoncé forward, alluding to Trayvon Martin, who was killed when wearing a black hoodie.

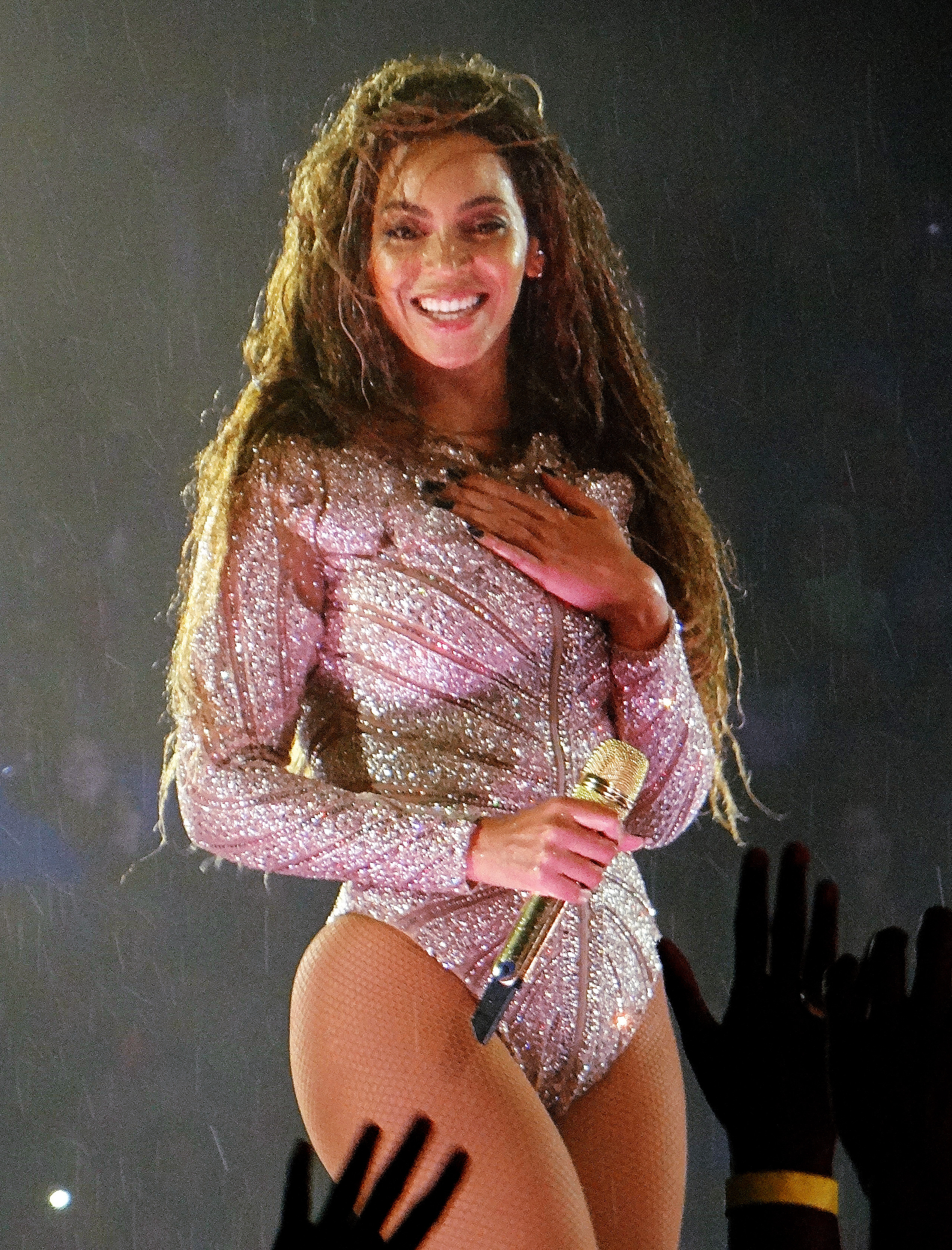
Beyoncé performing during the Formation World Tour at Carter–Finley Stadium in Raleigh, North Carolina on May 3, 2016

On October 19, Beyoncé performed "6 Inch" and "All Night" at the TIDAL X benefit concert at Barclays Center in Brooklyn, New York City. On November 2, Beyoncé performed "Daddy Lessons" with the Dixie Chicks at the 50th Annual Country Music Association Awards (2016). The performance (which was the first featuring the Dixie Chicks in a decade after being blacklisted for their criticism of George W Bush in 2003) was widely praised by critics, but was met with criticism and racism by conservative country fans; this sparked conversations about the identity of country music and black people's place in it. Subsequently, a remix of "Daddy Lessons" featuring the Dixie Chicks was released. At the 59th Annual Grammy Awards on February 12, 2017, Beyoncé performed "Love Drought" and "Sandcastles". Themed around motherhood, the five-months pregnant Beyoncé's performance is recognized by commentators to evoke various female deities and Renaissance European Christian art (such as Tintoretto's Last Supper, Simone Martini's Maestà and depictions of the Virgin of Guadalupe) and various non-European allusions such as Fulani facepainting, Ethiopian icons, Byzantine jewelry and Latin American Baroque painting.

To promote Lemonade, Beyoncé embarked on the Formation World Tour which visited countries in North America and Europe from April to October 2016. The stage featured the Es Devlin-designed 'Monolith', a revolving seven-storey-tall box made with video screen walls that could shoot out fire and fireworks and split open, and which revolved during the show to represent a new chapter in line with the Lemonade film. The Formation World Tour was met with positive reviews from critics, such as Kat Bein for Rolling Stone who described the show as "a prime example of entertainment and a vision of an artist at her apex" and "a visual feast as well as an emotional tour de force, packed with fireworks, confetti, rearranging stage designs and aerial dancers". The Formation World Tour won Tour of the Year at the 2016 American Music Awards, was included in Rolling Stone's 50 Greatest Concerts of the Last 50 Years list in 2017, and was named the best tour of the decade (2010s) by Consequence of Sound in 2019.

The Formation World Tour was ranked at number one and number two on Pollstar's 2016 mid-year Top 100 Tours chart both in North America and worldwide respectively, with a total mid-year worldwide gross of $137.3 million from the first twenty-five shows (including $126.3 million from the first North American leg of the tour). In total, the tour grossed $256 million from forty-nine sold-out shows according to Billboard box score, and ranked at number two on Pollstar's 2016 Year-End Tours chart.

=== Accompanying film ===
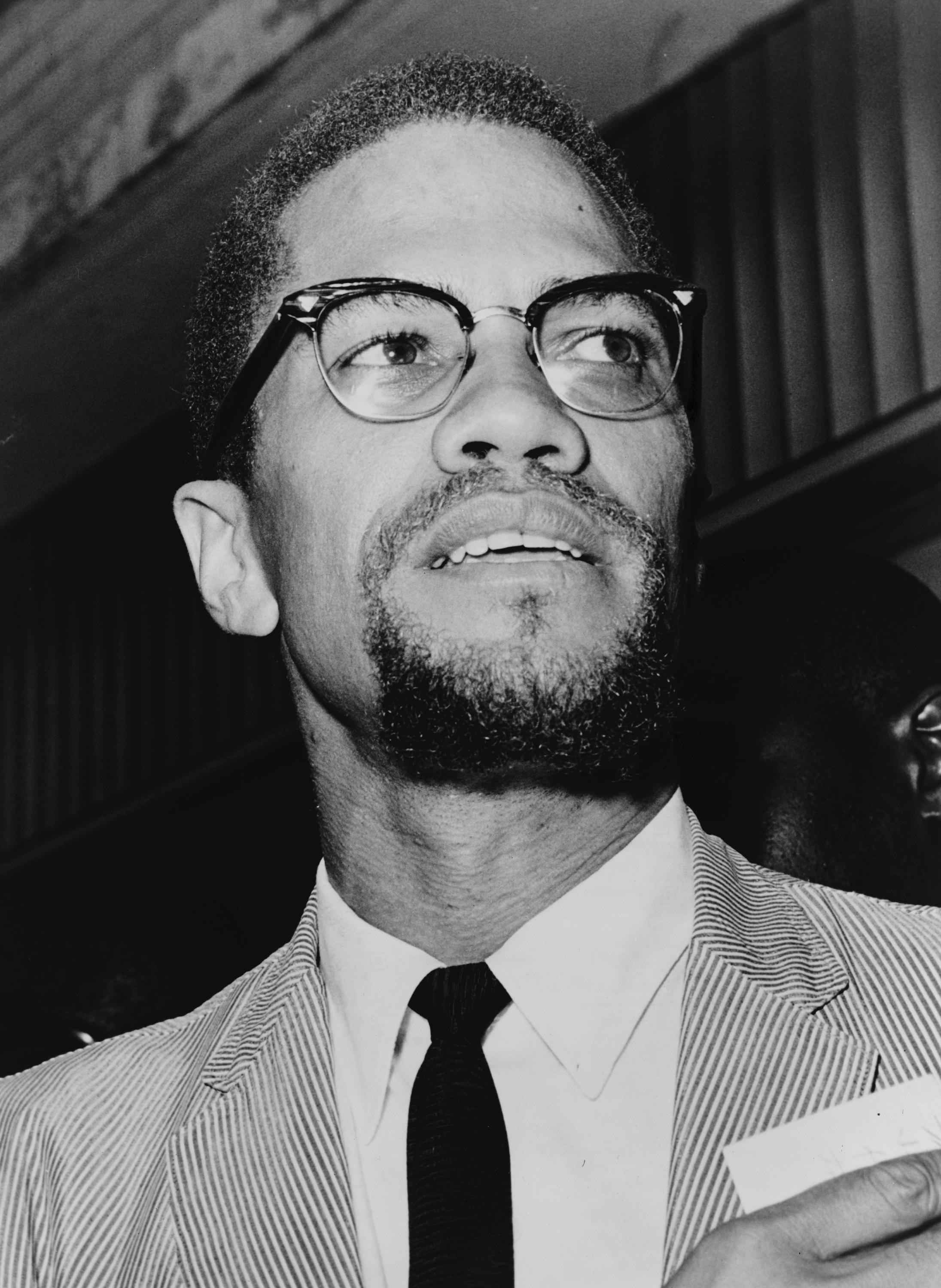
The film samples work by Malcolm X.

Lemonade was accompanied by the release of a sixty-five-minute film of the same title, produced by Good Company and Jonathan Lia, which premiered on HBO on April 23, 2016, logging 787,000 viewers. It is divided into eleven chapters, titled "Intuition", "Denial", "Anger", "Apathy", "Emptiness", "Accountability", "Reformation", "Forgiveness", "Resurrection", "Hope", and "Redemption". The film uses poetry and prose written by British-Somali poet Warsan Shire; the poems adapted were "The Unbearable Weight of Staying", "Dear Moon", "How to Wear Your Mother's Lipstick", "Nail Technician as Palm Reader", and "For Women Who Are Difficult to Love".

The film's cast features Ibeyi, Laolu Senbanjo, Amandla Stenberg, Quvenzhané Wallis, Chloe x Halle, Zendaya and Serena Williams. In "Forward", the mothers of Trayvon Martin (Sybrina Fulton), Michael Brown (Lesley McFadden), and Eric Garner (Gwen Carr) are featured holding pictures of their deceased sons. Jay-Z and Beyoncé's daughter Blue Ivy appears in home video footage at one point, as does Jay-Z's grandmother Hattie White, and Beyoncé's mother Tina Knowles, who is shown with her second husband Richard Lawson on their wedding day in 2015. The film also samples work by Malcolm X, specifically an excerpt from his speech "Who Taught You to Hate Yourself", which is featured on the track "Don't Hurt Yourself".

The Lemonade film appeared on a number of critics' lists. Pitchfork listed Lemonade at number one on their list of best music videos of 2016. It was also included on Sight & Sound's best films of 2016 list at number twenty-six. David Ehrlich, a film critic for IndieWire, placed Lemonade at number twenty-three on his Best Films of 2016 list. Jen Yamato from The Daily Beast ranked it at number nine on her list of the Top 10 Best Films of 2016. In June 2016, Matthew Fulks sued Beyoncé, Sony Music, Columbia Records and Parkwood Entertainment for allegedly lifting nine visual elements of his short film Palinoia for the trailer for Lemonade. The lawsuit was subsequently dismissed by New York federal judge Jed S. Rakoff, siding with the defendant.

=== Singles ===
Lemonade consisted of five singles, three of which would become major hits. All twelve songs charted on the US Billboard Hot 100. "Formation" was released as the first single exclusively on Tidal on February 6, 2016, along with its accompanying music video. The song was part of the set Beyoncé performed the following day at the Super Bowl 50 halftime show. "Formation" peaked at number ten on the US Billboard Hot 100. The music video for the song was uploaded onto Vevo in December 2016.

"Sorry" was released as the second single and serviced to rhythmic adult contemporary radio in the United States on May 3, 2016, and its music video was uploaded onto Vevo on June 22, 2016. The single debuted and peaked at number eleven on the US Billboard Hot 100.

"Hold Up" was the third single and was first released to contemporary hit radio stations in Germany and the United Kingdom on May 12, 2016, and was later serviced to radio in the United States on August 16, 2016. It debuted and peaked at number thirteen on the US Billboard Hot 100. The music video for "Hold Up" was uploaded onto Vevo on September 4, 2016.

The fourth and fifth singles released were "Freedom" and "All Night", respectively. Both became moderate hits with the former (released September 2016) peaking at US number thirty-five, and the latter (released December 2016) peaking at US number thirty-eight.

== Critical reception ==
Professional ratings
Aggregate scores
Source	Rating
AnyDecentMusic?	8.7/10
Metacritic	92/100
Review scores
Source	Rating
AllMusic	5/5 stars
The Daily Telegraph	5/5 stars
Entertainment Weekly	A+
The Guardian	5/5 stars
The Independent	5/5 stars
NME	4/5
Pitchfork	8.5/10
Rolling Stone	5/5 stars
Spin	9/10
Vice (Expert Witness)	A−

Lemonade received widespread acclaim upon release, with many describing it an instant classic, (Note: Attributed to multiple references:) a masterpiece, (Note: Attributed to multiple references:) and Beyoncé's magnum opus. At Metacritic, which assigns a normalized rating out of 100 to reviews from mainstream publications, the album received a weighted average score of 92, based on 33 reviews, indicating "universal acclaim".

Critics praised Lemonade as a culturally dominant and ambitious project that blended various art forms into a singular, groundbreaking work. Reviews characterized it as a "seismic" or era-defining album whose multimedia presentation and multi-layered themes expanded the possibilities of the album format. Critics also commended the album's scale and artistic vision: The Observer's Kitty Empire praised it as a "dazzling" spectacle that united high art and popular music, while Rolling Stone's Rob Sheffield described it as "a welcome reminder that giants still walk among us". The album's cohesion and complex narrative arc was seen to position Beyoncé as an "albums artist", with the Chicago Tribune's Greg Kot describing it as an immersive album that was "clearly conceived as a complete work" and held together by "Beyonce's unifying vision".

Reviews lauded Lemonade as both a deeply personal album and a bold socio-political statement. Many critics praised Beyoncé's raw vulnerability and personal revelations, with the confessional songwriting revealing a more exposed side to Beyoncé than her previous work. This made the album widely relatable and cathartic for the audience, according to Jon Pareles of The New York Times, allowing listeners to see their own experiences reflected in the narrative. Lemonade was also widely praised as a celebration of Black womanhood and African-American identity, with Greg Tate of Spin noting that the album explored the full breadth of Southern Black cultural traditions, poetry, and mythology. Reviews also interpreted Lemonade as a meditation on African-American trauma and resilience, praising how Beyoncé connected personal pain with broader historical and social themes.

Lemonade's musical composition and performance were likewise widely praised. Critics described the album as sonically adventurous and experimental with its diverse musical styles and references, which Pitchfork's Jillian Mapes said positioned Beyoncé as "a new kind of post-genre pop star". Critics also praised the overall song-cycle structure of the album, with The Guardian's Alexis Petridis commending the album for its diverse songs being unified through thematic storytelling and emotional progression across the tracklist. Many reviews praised Beyoncé's vocal performance as the most powerful and wide-ranging of her career, with Everett True of The Independent describing Beyoncé's "rawness of emotion and tear duct-filling emotion" in her delivery as a boundary-pushing performance.

== Accolades ==
At the end of 2016, Lemonade appeared on a number of critics' lists ranking the year's top albums. According to the BBC, it was the critics' top album of 2016. According to Metacritic, it was the album that was listed at number one by the most publications (37 publications), including Rolling Stone, Billboard, Entertainment Weekly, The Guardian, Digital Spy, The Independent, The Associated Press, The New York Times (Jon Pareles list), Los Angeles Times (Mikael Wood list), Pop Matters, Pretty Much Amazing, Idolator, Stereogum, Complex, Consequence of Sound, Wired, and US Weekly.

Lemonade was named the best album of the decade (2010s) by Consequence of Sound, The Associated Press and Spex. Lemonade was also named the best music video of the decade by The Daily Beast, as well as one of the best movies of the 2010s by Vox. Publications who included Lemonade in their top-five albums of the decade including Rolling Stone The Independent, New York Post, Billboard, Paste, The A.V. Club, WXPN The Key, Refinery29, Tampa Bay Times, Insider, The Young Folks, Genius, Variety, Uproxx, Noisey, The Independent, and The Wild Honey Pie.

In January 2025, Lemonade was named by Rolling Stone as the greatest album of the 21st century. Consequence of Sound named Lemonade the second best album of the last 15 years (2007–2022). BBC Radio 4's named Lemonade the eighth greatest risk in 21st century art, with the judges saying that Beyoncé "resisted the commercial pressure not to be political in order to stand up for what she believed in and let audiences into her personal life as never before". The Guardian listed it at number 25 on their ranking of the 100 best albums of the 21st century.

In 2020, Parade named Lemonade the best music video of all time. In 2017, the album was ranked at number 6 on NPR's list of the 150 Greatest Albums Made By Women. The Daily Telegraph named Lemonade the eighth greatest album of all time in 2025, with Neil McCormick describing it as a "bold, shapeshifting masterpiece channelling personal turmoil into visionary genre-hopping pop". The Washington Post named Lemonade one of the 25 most influential works in American culture, alongside the Star-Spangled Banner and Mickey Mouse, with writer Ashley Fetters Maloy citing its "audacious and ambitious" scope, popularization of visual albums and surprise albums, and impact on discussions on gender and racial equality. On their list of the top 100 albums of the publication's existence, The Quietus named the project at number 9. Apple Music ranked Lemonade at number 10 on their list of the 100 Best Albums ever created. Consequence of Sound named Lemonade the 18th greatest album of all time in 2022. Lemonade is the 29th best album of all time by Metacritic score. On Rolling Stone's 500 Greatest Albums of All Time list, Lemonade was placed at number 32, citing the album's exploration of "the betrayals of American blackness" and "all of the country's music traditions". Paste listed the album at number 55 on their list of the 300 Greatest Albums of All Time.

=== Awards ===
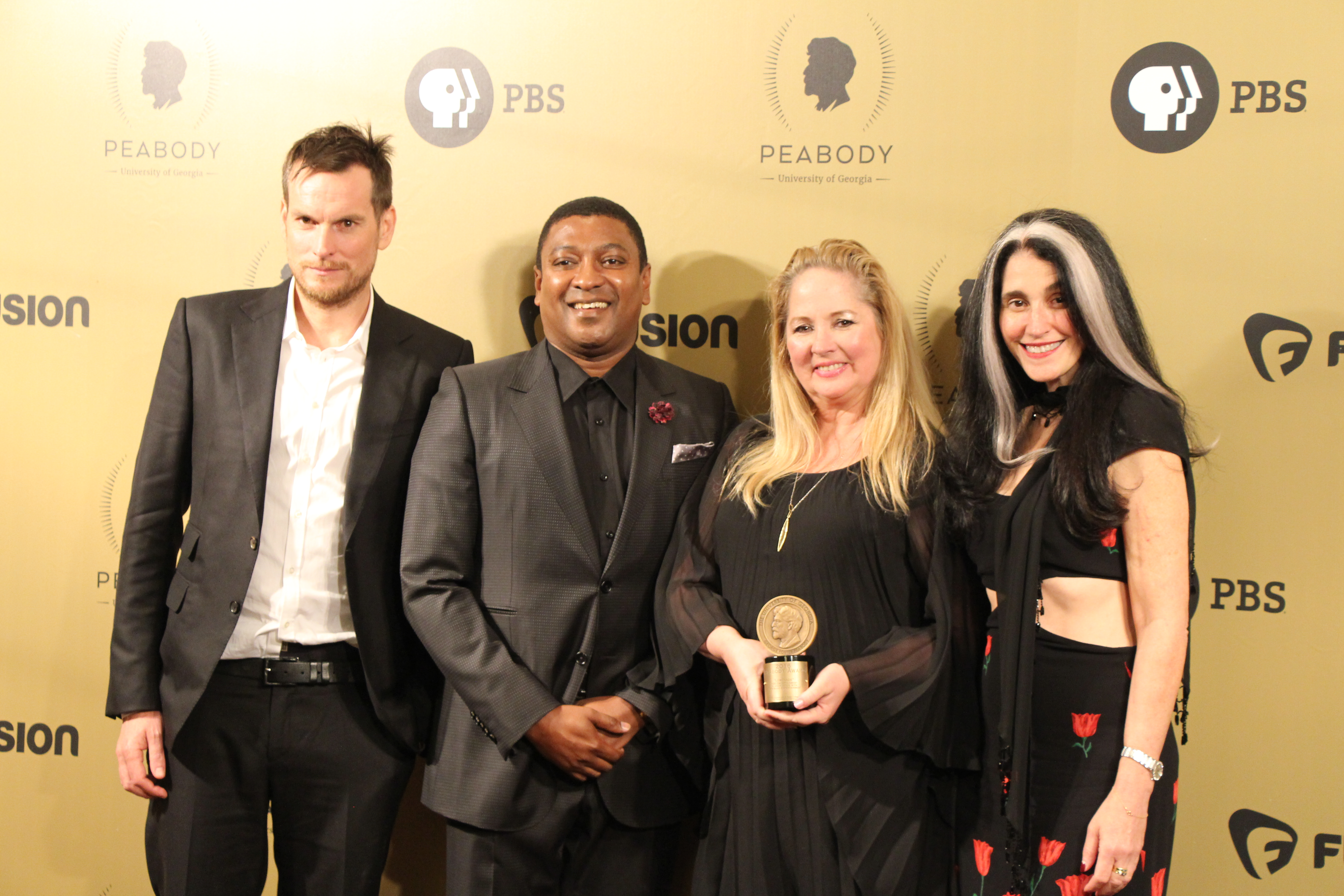
Lemonade won a Peabody Award in Entertainment at the 76th Annual Peabody Awards (pictured)

Lemonade was nominated for four Primetime Emmy Awards, including Outstanding Variety Special and Outstanding Directing for a Variety Special. The album received eleven nominations at the 2016 MTV Video Music Awards. They included Breakthrough Long Form Video for Lemonade, Video of the Year, Best Pop Video, Best Direction, Best Editing, and Best Cinematography for "Formation", Best Female Video and Best Art Direction for "Hold Up", and Best Choreography for "Sorry" and "Formation". Beyoncé went on to win eight of her nominations, including Video of the Year and Breakthrough Long Form Video.

At the 59th Annual Grammy Awards, Lemonade received three nominations: Album of the Year, Best Urban Contemporary Album and Best Music Film. "Formation" received three as well: Record of the Year, Song of the Year and Best Music Video. "Hold Up" was nominated for Best Pop Solo Performance, "Don't Hurt Yourself" for Best Rock Performance and "Freedom" for Best Rap/Sung Performance. Beyoncé went on to win two awards, Best Urban Contemporary Album and Best Music Video for "Formation".

Lemonade won a Peabody Award in Entertainment, along with the following description by the board of jurors:

Adroitly bringing together stories about betrayal, renewal, and hope, Lemonade draws from the prolific literary, musical, cinematic, and aesthetic sensibilities of black cultural producers to create a rich tapestry of poetic innovation. Defying genre and convention, Lemonade immerses viewers in the sublime worlds of black women, family, and community where we experience poignant and compelling stories about the lives of women of color and the bonds of friendship seldom seen or heard in American popular culture. This innovative and stunningly beautiful masterpiece challenges us to readjust our visual and sonic antennae and invites a reckoning with taken for granted ideas about who we are. For the audacity of its reach and the fierceness of its vision in challenging our cultural imagination about the intimacies and complexities of women of color, we recognize Lemonade as a Peabody Award winner. —The George Foster Peabody Awards Board of Jurors

Awards and nominations for Lemonade
Award	Year	Category	Result	Ref.
2016	African-American Film Critics Association	Best TV Show – Special or Limited Series	Won	
2016	AMFT Awards (Note: AMFT Awards is an online awards group.)	Album of the Year	Won	
2016	AMFT Awards	Best Music Film	Won	
2016	AMFT Awards	Best Contemporary R&B Album	Won	
2016	American Music Awards	Favorite Soul/R&B Album	Nominated	
2016	The Daily Californian Art Awards	Best Music Video	Won	
2016	Danish Music Awards	International Album of the Year	Nominated	
2016	Primetime Emmy Awards	Outstanding Variety, Music, or Comedy Special	Nominated	
2016	Primetime Emmy Awards	Outstanding Directing for a Variety Special	Nominated	
2016	Primetime Emmy Awards	Outstanding Picture Editing for a Variety Special	Nominated	
2016	Primetime Emmy Awards	Outstanding Production Design for a Variety, Nonfiction, Event or Award Special	Nominated	
2016	GAFFA Awards (Sweden)	Best International Album	Won	
2016	IFPI Awards	Global Top Album of 2016	Won	
2016	MTV Video Music Awards	Breakthrough Long Form Video	Won	
2016	MTV Video Music Awards Japan	Best Album of the Year	Won	
2016	Soul Train Music Awards	Album of the Year	Won	
2017	BET Awards	Album of the Year	Won	
2017	Billboard Music Awards	Top Billboard 200 Album	Nominated	
2017	Billboard Music Awards	Top R&B Album	Won	
2017	Black Reel Awards	Outstanding Television Documentary or Special	Won	
2017	Douban Abilu Music Awards	International Pop Album of the Year	Won	
2017	Grammy Awards	Album of the Year	Nominated	
2017	Grammy Awards	Best Urban Contemporary Album	Won	
2017	Grammy Awards	Best Music Film	Nominated	
2017	NAACP Image Awards	Outstanding Variety – Series or Special	Nominated	
2017	NAACP Image Awards	Outstanding Album	Won	
2017	NME Awards	Best Album	Nominated	
2017	NME Awards	Music Moment of the Year	Nominated	
2017	Peabody Award	Entertainment	Won	
2017	People's Choice Awards	Favorite Album	Nominated	
2019	UB Honors	R&B Album of the Decade	Won	

== Commercial performance ==
In the United States, Lemonade debuted at number one on the Billboard 200 chart dating May 14, 2016, with 653,000 album-equivalent units, out of which 485,000 were pure album sales. This made the highest opening-week sales for a female act of the year. Subsequently, she broke the record she previously tied with DMX, by becoming the first artist in the chart's history to have their first six studio albums debut at number one. In the same week, Beyoncé became the first female artist to chart twelve or more songs on the US Billboard Hot 100 at the same time, with every song on the album debuting on the chart.

The album slipped from number one to number two in its second week, selling 321,000 album-equivalent units, out of which 196,000 were pure album sales. It remained at number two in its third week selling 201,000 album-equivalent units, out of which 153,000 were pure album sales. Lemonade was certified platinum by the Recording Industry Association of America (RIAA) in June 2016. According to Nielsen's 2016 year-end report, it had sold 1,554,000 copies and 2,187,000 album-equivalent units in the United States. Following its April 23, 2019, release on all streaming services, Lemonade returned to the top ten on the Billboard 200 at number nine, while its only added song, the original demo of "Sorry", debuted at number nineteen on the US R&B Songs. On May 20, 2019, the album was certified double platinum for shipments of two million copies, and triple platinum on June 13, 2019, for shipments of three million copies. In Canada, the album debuted at number one with sales of 33,000 copies. By the end of 2016, the album had sold 138,000 album-equivalent units in Canada, out of which 101,000 were pure album sales.

The album debuted at number one on the UK Albums Chart selling 73,000 copies in its first week of release, with 10,000 equivalent sales (14% of the total sales) accounting for streaming, marking the largest ever for a number-one album since the chart began including streaming. The album marked the singer's third number-one album on the chart and was certified platinum by the British Phonographic Industry (BPI) on September 9, 2016, for shipments of 300,000 copies. All of the album's tracks also debuted within the top hundred of the UK Singles Chart. As in the US, 2020 is the first year since release that the album has not appeared on the UK Chart. In Australia, Lemonade sold 20,490 digital copies in its first week, debuting atop the Australian Albums Chart and becoming Beyoncé's second consecutive number-one album in the country. It received a double platinum certification from the Australian Recording Industry Association (ARIA) in 2023, for sales of 140,000 equivalent units.

Lemonade also peaked atop the charts in numerous European and Oceanic countries including Ireland and Belgium, where it spent five and seven weeks at the summit, respectively, Croatia, the Czech Republic, the Netherlands, New Zealand, Norway, Portugal, Scotland and Sweden. In Brazil, it debuted at number one and received a platinum certification from Pro-Música Brasil.

== Legacy ==
=== Music industry ===
==== Album format ====
Lemonade has been credited with reviving the concept of an album in an era dominated by singles and streaming, and popularizing releasing albums with accompanying films. Jamieson Cox for The Verge called Lemonade "the endpoint of a slow shift toward cohesive, self-centered pop albums", writing that "it's setting a new standard for pop storytelling at the highest possible scale". Megan Carpentier of The Guardian wrote that Lemonade has "almost revived the album format" as "an immersive, densely textured large-scale work" that can only be listened to in its entirety. Myf Warhurst on Double J's "Lunch With Myf" explained that Beyoncé "changed [the album] to a narrative with an arc and a story and you have to listen to the entire thing to get the concept".

==== Music films ====
The New York Times' Katherine Schulten agreed, asking "How do you talk about the ongoing evolution of the music video and the autobiographical album without holding up Lemonade as an exemplar of both forms?" Joe Coscarelli of The New York Times describes how "some brand-name acts are following Beyoncé's blueprint with high-concept mini-movies that can add artistic heft to projects," with Frank Ocean's Endless and Drake's Please Forgive Me cited as examples of artists' projects inspired by Lemonade. Other projects said to have followed the precedent that Lemonade set include Lonely Island's The Unauthorized Bash Brothers Experience, Thom Yorke's Anima, Sturgill Simpson's Sound & Fury, and Kid Cudi's Entergalactic, which were all albums released with complementary film projects.

==== Genre ====
Beyoncé's use of various genres on Lemonade has been credited with setting the precedent for music to transcend genre, with NPR writing that the album "leads us to this moment where post-genre becomes a thing". The use of various genres has also been credited with kickstarting the reclamation of certain genres by black people. "Daddy Lessons" has been credited as starting a trend of "pop stars toying with American West and Southern aesthetics," as well as setting the precedent for "The Yeehaw Agenda", the trend of reclaiming black cowboy culture through music and fashion. "Don't Hurt Yourself" has been credited with the reclaiming of rock by black women, with Brittany Spanos for Rolling Stone writing that "the re-imagination of what rock can be and who can sing it by Beyoncé and her superstar peers is giving the genre a second life – and may be what can save it."

==== Contemporaries ====
Several musicians were inspired by Lemonade. American rapper Snoop Dogg named his fourteenth studio album Coolaid (2016) after Lemonade. American singer Sabrina Carpenter credited Lemonade with inspiring her to not limit herself, explaining that the album "really transcended every genre" which made her "feel like I didn't have to just stay in a box from there on out". American rapper Cardi B was inspired by Lemonade for Am I the Drama? (2025), which she said is "going to have my Lemonade moments". American singer Fergie said that she was inspired by Lemonade to create a visual counterpart for her album Double Dutchess (2017). British girl group Little Mix cited Lemonade as an inspiration for their album Glory Days (2016). Naming Lemonade one of her favorite albums ever, English singer-songwriter Ellie Rowsell of Wolf Alice said that it helped her to "put in more thought to what makes a good album flow". American singer The-Dream wrote a response to Lemonade titled "Lemon Lean" in his EP Love You to Death, saying that the album changed the way people think about their relationships. American singer-songwriter Victoria Monét cited Lemonade as an inspiration for her work. American comedian Lahna Turner released a visual album entitled Limeade in homage to Lemonade. American singer Matt Palmer was inspired by Lemonade to create his visual EP Get Lost. American musician Todrick Hall's second studio album Straight Outta Oz was made as a visual album due to Lemonade. British singer-songwriter Arrow Benjamin was also inspired by Lemonade for his 2016 EP W.A.R. (We All Rise), saying: "Every piece on this project was created from a visual, so that's why I was extremely inspired when I saw Lemonade."

Ann Powers for NPR opined that Fiona Apple was influenced by Lemonade when implementing black musical traditions on her 2020 album Fetch the Bolt Cutters, while Jenna Wortham for The New York Times drew a parallel between both albums as "blueprints for how to take in all that emotion and kind of how to push it back out in a way that's cathartic and constructive". Dan Weiss of Billboard wrote that Shania Twain's Now "couldn't have existed without" Lemonade, as an album that "completely changed the course of breakup album history" in which the artist is "someone at their full creative peak pushing herself into new niches, dominating new musical territories". Kadeen Griffiths from Bustle states that Lemonade, as an album that deals with issues related to black women, "paved the way" for Alicia Keys' Here and Solange's A Seat at the Table. Danielle Koku for The Guardian stated that Lemonade aided the return of African mysticism to pop music, writing: "By taking African mysticism to the world stage, Beyoncé stripped it of its ancient pagan labels." Many critics have noted that Jay-Z's thirteenth studio album 4:44 (2017) is a response to Lemonade, with Jay-Z referencing lines from Lemonade, such as the "You better call Becky with the good hair" line on Beyoncé's "Sorry", with Jay-Z retorting: "Let me alone, Becky" in "Family Feud".

At the 59th Annual Grammy Awards (2017), Adele dedicated her Album of the Year award to Beyoncé and said: "The artist of my life is Beyoncé... the Lemonade album, is just so monumental." In a 2021 interview with Vogue, Adele claimed that Beyoncé should have won the said award instead of her. After the show, she went into Beyoncé's dressing room and "said to her, like, the way that the Grammys works, and the people who control it at the very, very top—they don't know what a visual album is. They don't want to support the way that she's moving things forward with her releases and the things that she's talking about." She revealed that the award she received in the mail was broken and that she wedged a lemon into the broken part, and went on to claim that, "[f]or [her] friends who are women of color, [Lemonade] was such a huge acknowledgment for them, of the sort of undermined grief that they go through." American musician Stevie Wonder called Lemonade "a great work, a great art piece". U2's Bono included "Freedom" in his "60 Songs That Saved My Life" project to celebrate his 60th birthday, writing: "In my 60 years, I was served many platters but rarely one like the Queen Bey's album Lemonade."

=== Popular culture ===
==== Art and literature ====
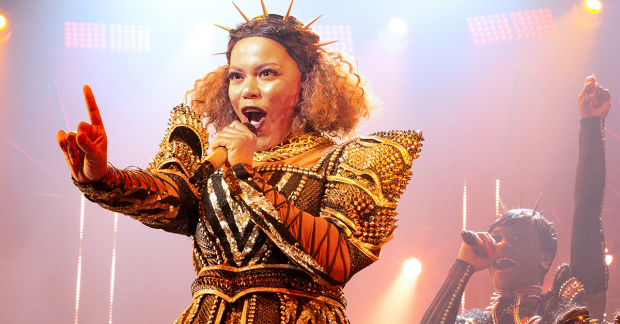
The character of Catherine of Aragon in the West End musical Six, originated by Jarnéia Richard-Noel (pictured), was inspired by Lemonade-era Beyoncé.

Lemonade has inspired artists in media other than music, including art, literature, film, television, and theatre. Misha Green, creator of the 2020 television series Lovecraft Country, described how Lemonade inspired the direction and flow of the show's score, saying: "What Beyoncé did on Lemonade, with bringing in the poems and taking us on this collage of a journey, that wasn't just music and visuals; [it was] also about words and using those words as a score." Bill Condon, director of the film Beauty and the Beast (2017), said the visuals of Lemonade inspired him: "You look at Beyoncé's brilliant movie Lemonade, this genre is taking on so many different forms... I do think that this very old-school break-out-into-song traditional musical is something that people understand again and really want.".

The Royal National Theatre's 2018 production of Shakespeare's Antony and Cleopatra featured a costume inspired by Lemonade, with costume designer Evie Gurney describing how she wanted to draw a parallel between Cleopatra and Beyoncé, as the latter is "a woman in the public eye who was subject to a lot of scrutiny [and] actually created a platform for herself to take back the narrative of her own story, and it was an extraordinary act of power." The character of Catherine of Aragon in the West End and Broadway musical Six was inspired by "Lemonade-era Beyoncé". Ellie Kendrick's 2018 play Hole at the Royal Court was described by its directors as "a stage version of Beyoncé's Lemonade album", as an artwork about feminism and historical oppression of women that consists of song, dance and spoken word.

Fashion stylist Salvador Camarena paid homage to Lemonade by designing a room dedicated to the album during Modernism Week, saying "That album is such a visually stunning album. There are so many iconic looks from the video, I kind of wanted to implement that world into that room." The young adult anthology A Phoenix First Must Burn edited by Patrice Caldwell, which explores "the Black experience through fantasy, science fiction, and magic", has the aim of "evoking Beyoncé's Lemonade for a teen audience". A 2017 video game titled "Lemonade Rage" was created in homage to Lemonade and the "Hold Up" music video. The cover of Marvel's 2017 America comic book paid homage to the "Formation" music video, with its illustrator saying "America is a comic that is all about representation, feminism and fighting for what's right... I could think of no better parallel than Beyoncé." Marie Claire named lemonade drop as one of the most influential pop culture moments of the 2010s.

==== Trends ====
The bee (left) and lemon (right) emojis took on symbolic meaning for fans following the release of the album, with an increase in 3.8 million posts using the emojis on Twitter.

Sales for Warsan Shire's chapbook "Teaching My Mother How to Give Birth" increased by 700 to 800% after her poetry was included in the Lemonade film. Beyoncé's mention of Red Lobster in "Formation" increased sales at the restaurant chain by 33%, prompting employees to rename popular menu items after Beyoncé and call the effect the "Beyoncé Bounce". Designers of the costumes that Beyoncé wore in the Lemonade film spoke with Complex about the impact this had on their careers; for example, Natalia Fedner, who designed Beyoncé's dress for "Hold Up", stated that because of the dress's inclusion in Lemonade, "I was on 'Entertainment Tonight' being hailed as a 'designer to watch'." The inclusion of imagery from the 1991 film Daughters of the Dust in the visuals for Lemonade helped bring the film back to theaters, with director Julie Dash stating that Lemonade "just took me places that I had not been seeing in a long, long time. It just reaffirmed a lot of things that I know to be true about visual style and visual metaphors. And the use of visual metaphors in creating, redefining, and reframing a Creole culture within this new world."

The popular "Lemonade braids" hairstyle worn by black women is named after a hairstyle that Beyoncé wore in Lemonade. Georgia Murray for Refinery29 sourced the 2020 fashion trend of wearing yellow to Lemonade, writing that Beyoncé's yellow dress in "Hold Up" "kickstarted an obsession with yellow that we're still seeing the effects of today". The use of the lemon and bee emojis increased due to the release of Lemonade, with a Twitter spokesperson telling Time: "Before Lemonade, the lemon emoji had no meaning. Since the launch of Lemonade, the emoji has taken on a meaning of its own". The MTV Video Music Award for Breakthrough Long Form Video, which Beyoncé ultimately won at the 2016 MTV Video Music Awards, was reintroduced after 25 years due to the Lemonade film.

==== Parodies and homages ====
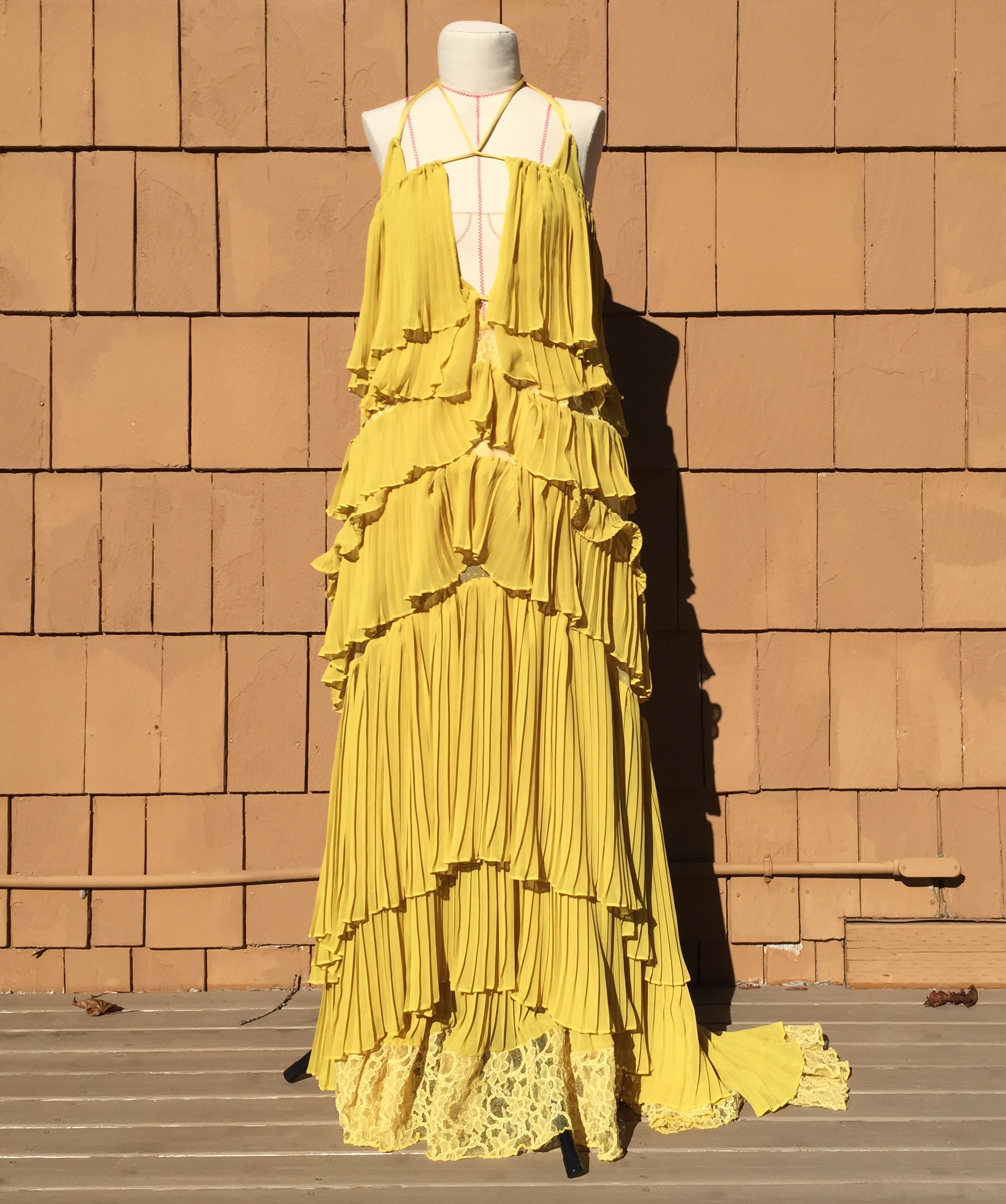
Beyoncé's "Hold Up" dress was widely replicated and referenced in popular culture.

Lemonade was parodied and was paid homage to in various media. In an episode of Unbreakable Kimmy Schmidt titled "Kimmy's Roommate Lemonades!", character Titus Andromedon parodied the videos for "Hold Up", "Sorry" and "All Night" after he suspects his boyfriend of infidelity, coining the term "Lemonading". This episode was subsequently nominated for two Emmy Awards: Outstanding Original Music And Lyrics for the "Hold Up" parody "Hell No", and Outstanding Supporting Actor In A Comedy Series for Tituss Burgess. The "Hold Up" music video was also paid homage to in The Simpsons, Making a Scene with James Franco, The Ellen DeGeneres Show, The Late Show with Stephen Colbert, and The Daily Show.

SNL produced two sketches on Lemonade: one entitled "The Day Beyoncé Turned Black" after Beyoncé released the "unapologetically black" "Formation", and the other entitled "Melanianade" which parodied the "Sorry" music video featuring impersonations of Donald Trump's female family members and aides. In a Late Night with Seth Meyers sketch titled "Beyoncé Lemonade Late Night Aftermath", females staffers empowered by Lemonade paid homage to the visuals, costumes, songs and poetry featured in the film. The Late Late Show with James Corden produced a parody entitled "Lemonjames: A Visual Monologue", where James Corden gave his monologue by recreating parts of the Lemonade film such as the "Pray You Catch Me", "Don't Hurt Yourself" and "6 Inch" music videos. Actress Goldie Hawn and comedian Amy Schumer produced a parody of "Formation". The Season 2 premiere of Crazy Ex-Girlfriend featured a musical number that was an homage to Lemonade, including parodies of "Formation" and "Pray You Catch Me".

For Beyoncé's 36th birthday, various black female public figures recreated a costume that Beyoncé wore in the "Formation" music video, including Michelle Obama and Serena Williams. The first episode of British comedian James Acaster's 2020 podcast titled Perfect Sounds (in which Acaster discusses why 2016 was the greatest year in music with various comedians) featured Romesh Ranganathan and focused on "the genius of Lemonade". Ten years after the release of Lemonade, Rockabye Baby! released a lullaby version of the album with soft musical instruments replacing Beyoncé's vocals.

=== Intellectual response ===
Lemonade has also received notable attention from scholars and authors outside the music industry. In partnership with the Zora Neale Hurston Festival of the Arts and Humanities, a talk at Seminole State College "discussed how Beyoncé embodies the conjure woman in her iconic audiovisual work Lemonade as a contemporary revision of Zora Neale Hurston's groundbreaking study of conjure and its place in Black women's spirit work." Museum of Design Atlanta (MODA) announced "The Lemonade Project", a twelve-month series of conversations centered around the visual album. The series will explore the themes of race, gender and class addressed by the album.

Kinitra Brooks and Kameelah Martin produced "The Lemonade Reader", described as "an educational tool to support and guide discussions of the visual album at postgraduate and undergraduate levels, [which] critiques Lemonade's multiple Afrodiasporic influences, visual aesthetics, narrative arc of grief and healing, and ethnomusicological reach." University of Texas at Austin professor Omise'eke Tinsley wrote a book entitled Beyoncé in Formation: Remixing Black Feminism that was released in 2018, which "analyzes Beyoncé's visual album, Lemonade, in relation to the sexuality and gender of Black women". University of Albany professor Janell Hobson produced a lesson plan based on her class on Lemonade, saying "Beyoncé's Lemonade stimulates class discussions and assignments as a highly visible pop project striving to create deeper conversations on the meanings of Blackness, womanhood, and feminism." Dissect Podcast have since dedicated their sixth season to "Beyoncé's masterwork Lemonade." The host, Cole Cuchna and cohost Titi Shodiya, "make leaps of interpretative wonder, fusing insights, music theory, instrumentation, and lyric interpretation with social analysis to empower fans to build deeper connections with Beyoncé's artistry."

==== Race and identity ====
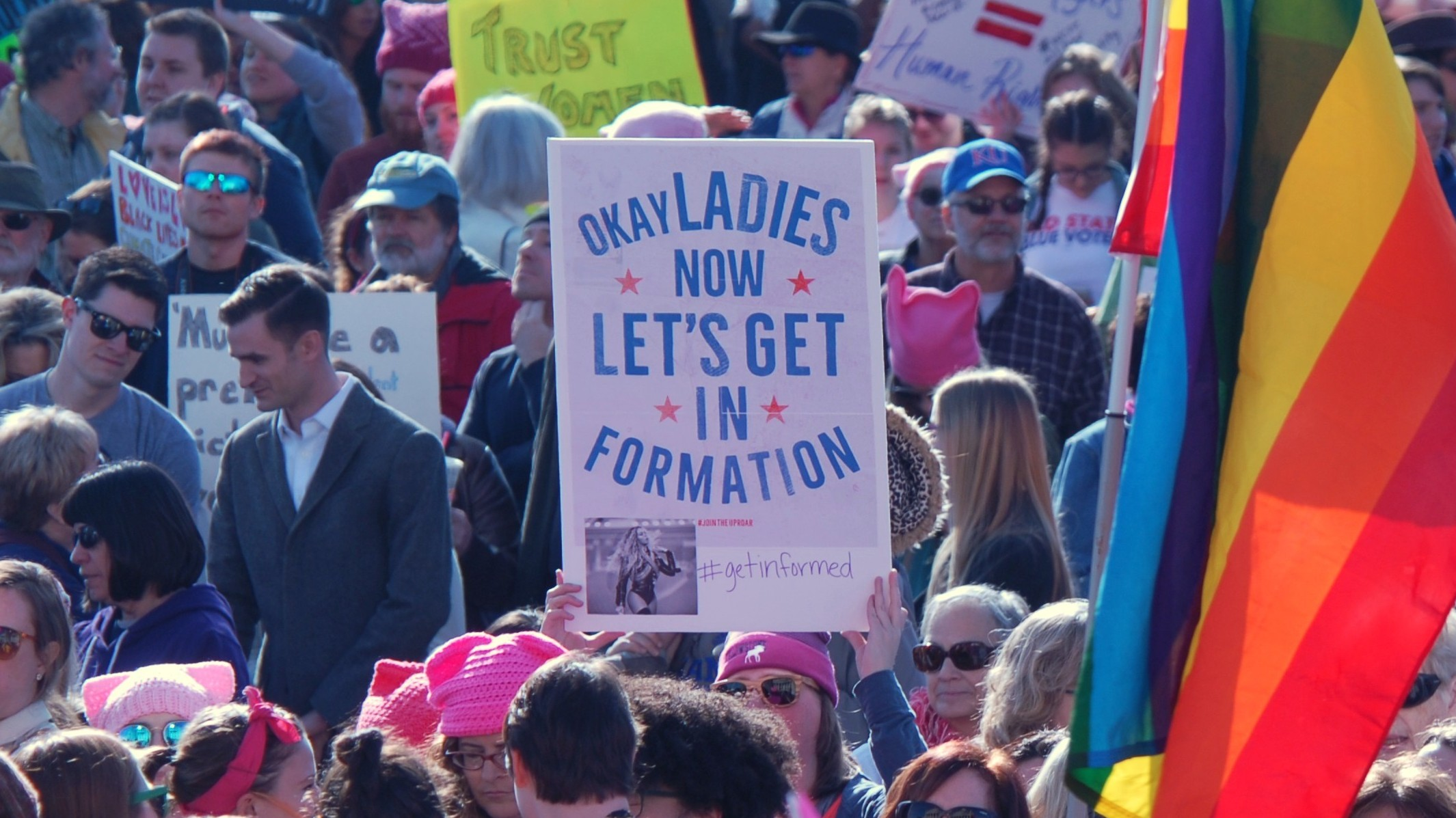
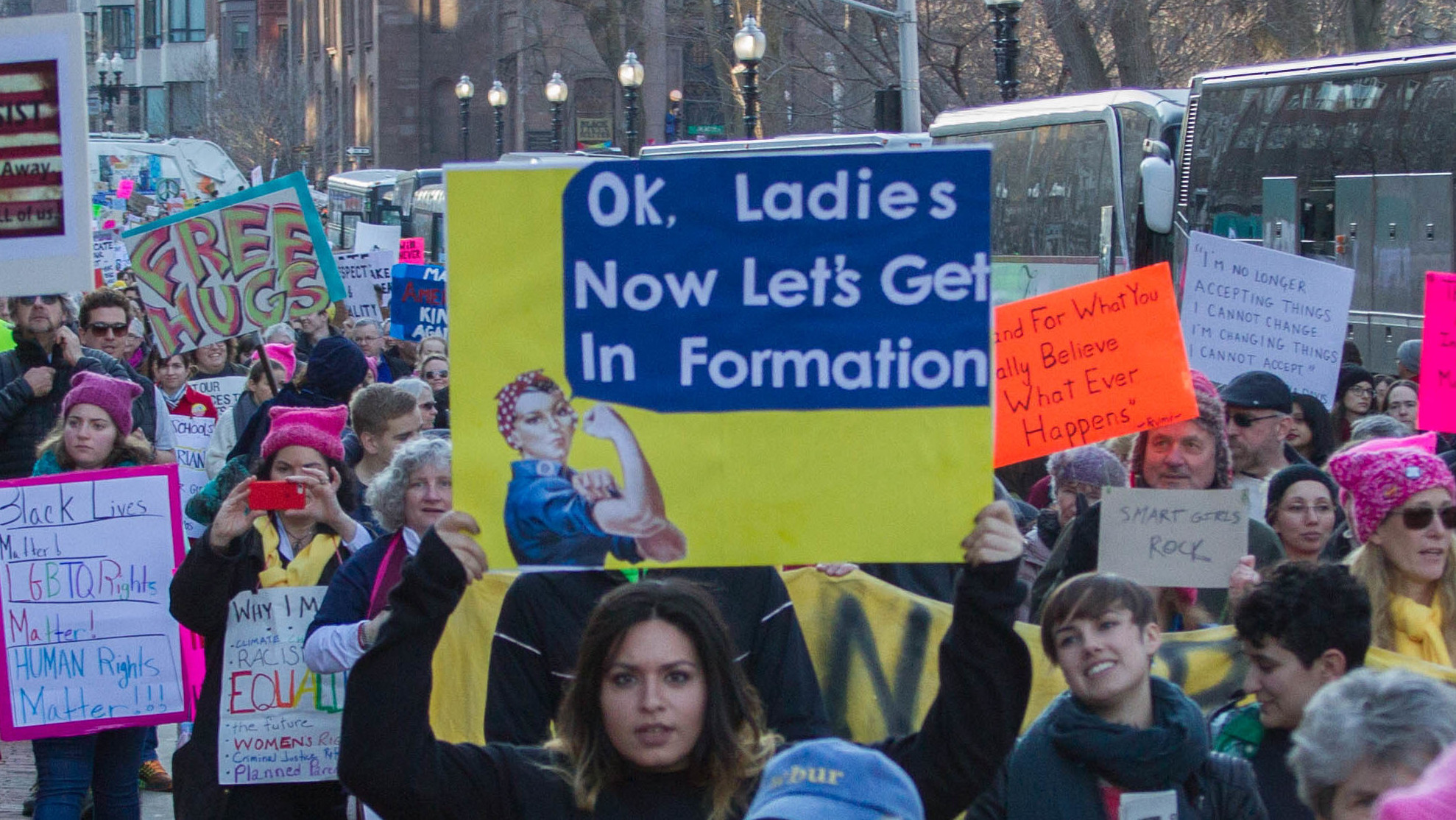
"Formation" and "Freedom" have been used as anthems for various socio-political movements, with their lyrics featuring on signs at protests.

In a 2020 New York Times article titled "The African-American Art Shaping the 21st Century", which contained 35 prominent black artists talking about the work that inspires them most, American actress Kerry Washington relayed about Lemonade as a game changer "visually, musically, but also sociopolitically, and anthropologically. The release of "Formation" and the consequent performance at the Super Bowl 50 halftime show caused both conversation and controversy due to its "unapologetic Blackness". Many articles and think pieces were produced discussing the importance and meaning of the song and performance, such as the BBC, who produced an article entitled "Beyoncé's Super Bowl performance: Why was it so significant?", and TheWrap, who produced an article entitled "Why Beyoncé's 'Formation' Matters So Much: A Perfectly Choreographed Political Debut Before 112 Million." Lemonade as a whole also inspired many think pieces, particularly written by black women, that analyze the messages and significance of the album, such as Miriam Bale for Billboard who named Lemonade "a revolutionary work of black feminism".

Lemonade tracks "Formation" and "Freedom" became known as protest songs upon their release and have since been used as anthems for various sociopolitical movements. The songs became Black Lives Matter anthems, being adopted by activists and played at protests worldwide. "Formation" and "Freedom" continued to be used as protest songs of the Black Lives Matter movement in 2020, with the tracks being played at the George Floyd protests. "Formation" also became a women's empowerment anthem, with it being used to show support for the #MeToo movement and its lyrics being featured on signs at the Women's March. In 2024, Beyoncé gave Vice President Kamala Harris permission to use "Freedom" as the official song for her 2024 presidential campaign.

Megan Carpentier of The Guardian named the album "a pop culture phenomenon" and wrote: "It is not an exaggeration to say that there is no other living musical artist who could ignite such a broad and unavoidable conversation just by releasing a new album – even a visual one." Writing in the same publication, Syreeta McFadden noted that the "Formation" video depicts archetypal southern Black women "in ways that we haven't seen frequently represented in popular art or culture". Melissa Harris-Perry of Time magazine said that "Beyoncé publicly embraced explicitly feminist Blackness at a politically risky moment." Candace McDuffie of Glamour said with Lemonade, the poignant magnum opus about the dynamic beauty of Black womanhood, Beyoncé became the cultural zeitgeist and reinforced the idea that anything she does causes pandemonium on a global scale.

==== Academic study ====
Since its release, the album has spawned a large syllabus of literature and academic studies. The University of Texas at San Antonio offered a class in the Fall of 2016 based on the album. The course, titled "Black Women, Beyoncé and Popular Culture", explored how the visual album "is a meditation on contemporary Black womanhood," before advancing and diving into the "theoretical, historical, and literary frameworks of Black feminism," according to the syllabus. The University of Tennessee at Chattanooga hosted a "Lemonade Week" in April 2017, which featured discussions on feminism, theatrical performances, celebrations of African-American women writers and poets, and choreography tutorials. Harvard University hosted "The Lemon Drop": a discussion that explored the nuances of Lemonade. University of Arkansas offered a course that analyzed the influence of Black feminism on Beyoncé and Lemonade. University of Pennsylvania ran two courses that explored politics, race and gender through the study of Lemonade.

Michigan State University hosted a discussion on Lemonade as part of their series for "exchanging ideas and exploring the lived experiences of underrepresented and marginalized communities". Chatham University based a writing class on Lemonade, where "students get to examine how they fit into the power systems around them". Valdosta State University offered a course on Lemonade, "unpacking the many themes found in "Lemonade", including Black identity, feminism, marital infidelity, sisterhood, and faith." The College of Charleston hosted a discussion by Black feminist scholars, exploring "Beyoncé's use of southern landscape, Black women, music, and African-based spirituality". University of North Georgia offered a class entitled "Okay, Ladies, Now Let's Get in Formation: Intersectional Feminism in Beyoncé's Lemonade" that explored the music, lyrics and visuals of Lemonade.

== Track listing ==
Lemonade track listing
No.	Title	Writer(s)	Producer(s)	Length
1.	"Pray You Catch Me"	Kevin Garrett; Beyoncé; James Blake	Garrett; Beyoncé; Jeremy McDonald	3:16
2.	"Hold Up"	Thomas Wesley Pentz; Ezra Koenig; Beyoncé; Emile Haynie; Joshua Tillman; Uzoechi Emenike; Sean Rhoden; Doc Pomus; Mort Schuman; DeAndre Way; Antonio Randolph; Kelvin McConnell; Brian Chase; Karen Orzolek; Nick Zinner	Diplo; Beyoncé; Ezra Koenig	3:41
3.	"Don't Hurt Yourself" (featuring Jack White)	Jack White; Beyoncé; Diana Gordon; James Page; Robert Plant; John Paul Jones; John Bonham	White; Beyoncé; Derek Dixie^{[b]}	3:53
4.	"Sorry"	Gordon; Rhoden; Beyoncé	MeLo-X; Beyoncé; Gordon; Hit-Boy^{[b]}; HazeBanga^{[b]}; Stuart White^{[c]}	3:52
5.	"6 Inch" (featuring the Weeknd)	Abel Tesfaye; Beyoncé; Danny Schofield; Ben Diehl; Terius Nash; Ahmad Balshe; Boots; Dave Portner; Noah Lennox; Brian Weitz; Burt Bacharach; Hal David	DannyBoyStyles; Ben Billions; Beyoncé; Boots; Dixie^{[c]}	4:20
6.	"Daddy Lessons"	Gordon; Beyoncé; Kevin Cossom; Alex Delicata	Beyoncé; Dixie^{[b]}; Delicata^{[b]}	4:48
7.	"Love Drought"	Mike Dean; Ingrid Burley; Beyoncé	Dean; Beyoncé	3:57
8.	"Sandcastles"	Vincent Berry II; Beyoncé; Malik Yusef; Midian Mathers	Beyoncé; Berry II	3:02
9.	"Forward" (featuring James Blake)	Blake; Beyoncé	Blake; Beyoncé	1:19
10.	"Freedom" (featuring Kendrick Lamar)	Jonathan Coffer; Beyoncé; Carla Williams; Arrow Benjamin; Kendrick Duckworth; Frank Tirado; Alan Lomax; John Lomax, Sr.	Coffer; Beyoncé; Just Blaze	4:49
11.	"All Night"	Pentz; Beyoncé; Henry Allen; Ilsey Juber; Theron Thomas; Timothy Thomas; Akil King; Jaramye Daniels; André Benjamin; Patrick Brown; Antwan Patton	Diplo; Beyoncé; Henry^{[b]}	5:22
12.	"Formation"	Michael L. Williams II; Khalif Brown; Asheton Hogan; Beyoncé	Mike Will Made-It; Beyoncé; Pluss^{[b]}	3:26
Total length:				45:45

2019 digital bonus track
No.	Title	Writer(s)	Producer(s)	Length
13.	"Sorry" (original demo)	Beyoncé; Gordon; Daniel Jones	Beyoncé; Jones	3:24
Total length:				49:09

Visual^{[a]}
No.	Title	Director(s)	Length
14.	"Lemonade Film"	Beyoncé Knowles-Carter; Kahlil Joseph; Matsoukas^{[d]}; Todd Tourso^{[d]}; Dikayl Rimmasch^{[d]}; Jonas Åkerlund^{[d]}; Mark Romanek^{[d]}	65:22

=== Notes ===
- ^{^[a]}Visual edition was released on CD/DVD, digital download and Tidal. CD/DVD edition does not include "Sorry" (original demo). Tidal edition additionally includes "Formation" (choreography version) video.
- ^{^[b]} signifies a co-producer.
- ^{^[c]} signifies an additional producer.
- ^{^[d]} signifies an additional director.

=== Sample credits ===
- "Hold Up"
  - contains elements of "Can't Get Used to Losing You", performed by Andy Williams, written by Doc Pomus and Mort Shuman
  - embodies portions of "Turn My Swag On", performed by Soulja Boy, written by DeAndre Way, Antonio Randolph and Kelvin McConnell
  - contains elements of "Maps", performed by the Yeah Yeah Yeahs, written by Brian Chase, Karen Orzolek and Nick Zinner.
- "Don't Hurt Yourself"
  - features samples from "When the Levee Breaks", performed by Led Zeppelin, written by James Page, Robert Plant, John Paul Jones and John Bonham.
- "6 Inch"
  - embodies portions of "My Girls", performed by Animal Collective, written by Dave Portner, Noah Lennox and Brian Weitz
  - contains samples from "Walk On By", performed by Isaac Hayes, written by Burt Bacharach and Hal David.
- "Freedom"
  - contains a sample of "Let Me Try", performed by Kaleidoscope, written by Frank Tirado
  - contains a sample of "Collection Speech/Unidentified Lining Hymn", performed by Reverend R.C. Crenshaw, recorded by Alan Lomax
  - contains a sample of "Stewball", performed by Prisoner "22" at Mississippi State Penitentiary at Parchman, recorded by Alan Lomax and John Lomax, Sr.
- "All Night"
  - contains elements of "SpottieOttieDopaliscious", performed by OutKast, written by André Benjamin, Antwan Patton and Patrick Brown.
- "Sorry (original demo)"
  - interpolates "Young, Wild & Free", as performed by Snoop Dogg and Wiz Khalifa featuring Bruno Mars.
- Lemonade
  - contains a sample of "The Court of the Crimson King", performed by King Crimson, written by Ian McDonald and Peter Sinfield.

== Personnel ==
Credits from the album's liner notes, Beyoncé's official website, and Spotify

Musicians

- Beyoncé – vocals (all tracks)
- Jack White – vocals & bass guitar (track 3)
- The Weeknd – vocals (track 5)
- James Blake – vocals & piano (track 9); Jupiter bass (track 1)
- Kendrick Lamar – vocals (track 10)
- MeLo-X – background vocals (track 2)
- Ruby Amanfu – background vocals (track 3)
- Chrissy Collins – background vocals (track 4)
- Belly – additional vocals (track 5)
- Arrow Benjamin – background vocals (track 10)
- Diplo – background vocals (track 11); drum programming (tracks 2, 11)
- King Henry – background vocals, drum programming & guitar (track 11)
- Jr Blender – drum programming & guitar (track 2)
- Derek Dixie – drum programming (tracks 3, 6, 11); additional instrumentation (track 5, 11); drums & band session leading (track 6); horns arrangement (tracks 11, 12)
- Mike Dean – drum programming & keyboards (track 7)
- Patrick Keeler – drums (track 3)
- Jon Brion – string arrangements (tracks 1, 3, 11)
- Eric Gorfain – strings & orchestrations (tracks 1, 3, 11)
- Daphne Chen – strings (tracks 1, 3, 11)
- Charlie Bisharat – strings (tracks 1, 3, 11)
- Josefina Vergara – strings (tracks 1, 3, 11)
- Songa Lee – strings (tracks 1, 3, 11)
- Marisa Kuney – strings (tracks 1, 3, 11)
- Neel Hammond – strings (tracks 1, 3, 11)
- Susan Chatman – strings (tracks 1, 3, 11)
- Katie Sloan – strings (tracks 1, 3, 11)
- Amy Wickman – strings (tracks 1, 3, 11)
- Lisa Dondlinger – strings (tracks 1, 3, 11)
- Terry Glenny – strings (tracks 1, 3, 11)
- Ina Veli – strings (tracks 1, 3, 11)
- Gina Kronstadt – strings (tracks 1, 3, 11)
- Yelena Yegoryan – strings (tracks 1, 3, 11)
- Radu Pieptea – strings (tracks 1, 3, 11)
- Crystal Alforque – strings (tracks 1, 3, 11)
- Serena McKinney – strings (tracks 1, 3, 11)
- Leah Katz – strings (tracks 1, 3, 11)
- Alma Fernandez – strings (tracks 1, 3, 11)
- Rodney Wirtz – strings (tracks 1, 3, 11)
- Briana Bandy – strings (tracks 1, 3, 11)
- Anna Bulbrook – strings (tracks 1, 3, 11)
- Grace Park – strings (tracks 1, 3, 11)
- Richard Dodd – strings (tracks 1, 3, 11)
- John Krovoza – strings (tracks 1, 3, 11)
- Ira Glansbeek – strings (tracks 1, 3, 11)
- Vanessa Fairbairn-Smith – strings (tracks 1, 3, 11)
- Ginger Murphy – strings (tracks 1, 3, 11)
- Adrienne Woods – strings (tracks 1, 3, 11)
- Denise Briese – strings (tracks 1, 3, 11)
- Ryan Cross – strings (tracks 1, 3, 11)
- Geoff Osika – strings (tracks 1, 3, 11)
- Fats Kaplan – strings (track 3)
- Lindsey Smith-Trestle – strings (track 3)
- Mark Watrous – strings & Hammond organ (track 3)
- Randolph Ellis – horns (tracks 6, 11)
- Peter Ortega – horns (tracks 6, 11)
- Christopher Gray – horns (tracks 6, 11)
- Richard Lucchese – horns (tracks 6, 11)
- Patrick Williams – harmonica (track 6)
- Erick Walls – guitar (track 6)
- Courtney Leonard – bass (track 6)
- Marcus Miller – bass (tracks 10, 11)
- Jack Chambazyan – synths (track 8)
- Boots – synth arrangement (track 8); additional programming (track 10)
- B. Carr – additional programming (track 4)
- Too Many Zooz – additional instrumentation (track 6)
- Myles William – additional programming (track 10)
- Matt Doe – trumpet (track 12)
- Swae Lee – ad-libs (track 12)
- Big Freedia – additional background ad-libs (track 12)
- Kevin Garrett – piano (track 1)
- Vincent Berry II – piano (track 8)
- Canei Finch – additional piano (track 10)

Technical

- Beyoncé – vocal production (all tracks); executive production
- Greg Koller – string engineering (tracks 1, 3, 11); keyboard engineering (tracks 1, 11); bass engineering (track 11)
- Stuart White – recording & engineering (all tracks); mixing (tracks 1–4, 6, 7, 9, 10, 12, 13); additional production (track 4)
- Vance Powell – recording (track 3)
- Joshua V. Smith – recording, additional overdubs & Pro Tools editing recording (track 3)
- Ramon Rivas – second engineering (tracks 1–7, 9–11)
- Mike Dean – engineering (track 7)
- Derek Dixie – assistant recording engineering (track 6)
- Eric Caudieux – Pro Tools editing recording (tracks 1, 3, 11); keyboard recording (tracks 1, 11)
- Jon Shacter – engineering assistance (track 2)
- Lester Mendoza – additional instrumentation recording (track 3); band recording engineering (track 6); horn recording (track 11)
- Ed Spear – additional studio assistance (track 3)
- Tony Maserati – mixing (tracks 5, 8, 11)
- Jaycen Joshua – mixing (track 12)
- John Cranfield – assistant recording engineering (track 1, 9, 11), assistant mix engineering (tracks 2–4, 6, 7, 10)
- Tyler Scott – assistant mix engineering (tracks 5, 11)
- James Krausse – assistant mix engineering (track 5)
- Miles Comaskey – assistant mix engineering (track 8)
- Arthur Chambazyan – assistant mix engineering (track 12); studio assistance (tracks 1–4, 6, 7, 9, 10, 12)
- David Nakaji – assistant mix engineering (track 12)
- Maddox Chhim – assistant mix engineering (track 12)
- Dave Kutch – mastering (all tracks)
- Teresa LaBarbera Whites – A&R executive

== Charts ==
=== Weekly charts ===
Weekly chart performance
Chart (2016–19)	Peak position
Australian Albums (ARIA)	1
Australian Urban Albums (ARIA)	1
Austrian Albums (Ö3 Austria)	9
Belgian Albums (Ultratop Flanders)	1
Belgian Albums (Ultratop Wallonia)	9
Brazilian Music DVD (ABPD)	1
Canadian Albums (Billboard)	1
Croatian International Albums (HDU)	1
Czech Albums (ČNS IFPI)	1
Danish Albums (Hitlisten)	3
Dutch Albums (Album Top 100)	1
Finnish Albums (Suomen virallinen lista)	4
French Albums (SNEP)	7
German Albums (Offizielle Top 100)	3
Greek Albums (IFPI)	7
Hungarian Albums (MAHASZ)	3
Irish Albums (IRMA)	1
Italian Albums (FIMI)	5
Japan Hot Albums (Billboard Japan)	17
Japanese Albums (Oricon)	43
Mexican Albums (AMPROFON)	6
New Zealand Albums (RMNZ)	1
Norwegian Albums (VG-lista)	1
Polish Albums (ZPAV)	2
Portuguese Albums (AFP)	1
Scottish Albums (Official Charts)	1
South Korean Albums (Circle)	14
South Korean International Albums (Circle)	1
Spanish Albums (Promusicae)	2
Swedish Albums (Sverigetopplistan)	1
Swiss Albums (Schweizer Hitparade)	2
Taiwanese Albums (Five Music)	1
UK Albums (Official Charts)	1
UK R&B Albums (Official Charts)	1
US Billboard 200	1
US Top R&B/Hip-Hop Albums (Billboard)	1

=== Year-end charts ===
Year-end chart performance
Chart (2016)	Position
Australian Albums (ARIA)	3
Australian Urban Albums (ARIA)	1
Belgian Albums (Ultratop Flanders)	9
Belgian Albums (Ultratop Wallonia)	71
Brazilian Albums (ABPD)	2
Canadian Albums (Billboard)	10
Danish Albums (Hitlisten)	75
Dutch Albums (Album Top 100)	13
French Albums (SNEP)	130
German Albums (Offizielle Top 100)	70
Hungarian Albums (MAHASZ)	94
Hungarian Albums & Compilations (MAHASZ)	61
Icelandic Albums (Tónlistinn)	48
Italian Albums (FIMI)	64
New Zealand Albums (RMNZ)	12
Polish Albums (ZPAV)	72
South Korean International Albums (Circle)	25
Spanish Albums (PROMUSICAE)	42
Swedish Albums (Sverigetopplistan)	33
Swiss Albums (Schweizer Hitparade)	32
UK Albums (Official Charts)	11
US Billboard 200	4
US Top R&B/Hip-Hop Albums (Billboard)	2
Worldwide Albums (IFPI Global Music Report)	1

Year-end chart performance
Chart (2017)	Position
Australian Albums (ARIA)	92
Australian Urban Albums (ARIA)	15
Belgian Albums (Ultratop Flanders)	95
South Korean International Albums (Circle)	95
US Billboard 200	71
US Top R&B/Hip-Hop Albums (Billboard)	40

Year-end chart performance
Chart (2019)	Position
Australian Urban Albums (ARIA)	66
Belgian Albums (Ultratop Flanders)	150
Dutch Albums (Album Top 100)	78
Icelandic Albums (Tónlistinn)	32

Year-end chart performance
Chart (2020)	Position
Icelandic Albums (Tónlistinn)	90

=== Decade-end charts ===
Decade-end chart performance
Chart (2010–2019)	Position
US Billboard 200	76

== Certifications and sales ==
Certifications for Lemonade, with pure sales where available
Region	Certification	Certified units/sales
Australia (ARIA)	2× Platinum	140,000^{‡}
Belgium (BRMA)	Gold	15,000^{*}
Brazil (Pro-Música Brasil)	Platinum	40,000^{‡}
Canada (Music Canada)	2× Platinum	160,000^{‡} / 101,000
Denmark (IFPI Danmark)	Platinum	20,000^{‡}
France (SNEP)	Gold	50,000^{‡}
Germany (BVMI)	Gold	100,000^{‡}
Iceland (FHF)	—	1,713
Italy (FIMI)	Gold	25,000^{‡}
New Zealand (RMNZ)	2× Platinum	30,000^{‡}
Poland (ZPAV)	Platinum	20,000^{‡}
South Korea	—	2,861
Sweden (GLF)	Platinum	40,000^{‡}
Switzerland (IFPI Switzerland)	Gold	10,000^{^}
United Kingdom (BPI)	2× Platinum	600,000^{‡}
United States (RIAA)	4× Platinum	4,000,000^{‡} / 1,554,000
Summaries
Worldwide (IFPI)	—	2,500,000
^{*} Sales figures based on certification alone.^{^} Shipments figures based on certification alone.^{‡} Sales+streaming figures based on certification alone.

== Release history ==
Release dates and formats
Initial release date	Edition	Format(s)	Ref.
April 23, 2016	Visual	Streaming (Tidal exclusive); digital download; CD and DVD; vinyl LP (Note: "Lemonade Film" is provided as a limited-time free digital download.)	
April 23, 2019	Visual (reissue)	Streaming (Tidal exclusive); digital download	
April 23, 2019	Audio-only	Streaming	

== See also ==
- List of Billboard 200 number-one albums of 2016
- List of Billboard number-one R&B/hip-hop albums of 2016
- List of number-one albums of 2016 (Australia)
- List of number-one albums of 2016 (Belgium)
- List of number-one albums of 2016 (Canada)
- List of number-one albums of the 2010s (Czech Republic)
- List of number-one albums of 2016 (Ireland)
- List of number-one albums in Norway
- List of number-one albums of 2016 (Portugal)
- List of number-one singles and albums in Sweden
- List of UK Albums Chart number ones of the 2010s
- List of UK R&B Albums Chart number ones of 2016
