= Don't Hurt Yourself =

Don't Hurt Yourself may refer to:

- "Don't Hurt Yourself" (Marillion song), from the 2004 album Marbles
- "Don't Hurt Yourself" (Beyoncé song), from the 2016 album Lemonade
