= Hold Up (song) =

Single by Beyoncé

from the album Lemonade
- Released: May 27, 2016
- Recorded: 2014
- Studio: Record Plant, Los Angeles
- Genre: Reggae
- Length: 3:41
- Label: Parkwood; Columbia
- Songwriters: Thomas Pentz; Ezra Koenig; Beyoncé Knowles; Emile Haynie; Josh Tillman; Uzoechi Emenike; MeLo-X; Doc Pomus; Mort Shuman; DeAndre Way; Antonio Randolph; Kelvin McConnell; Karen Orzolek; Brian Chase; Nick Zinner
- Producers: Diplo; Beyoncé; Ezra Koenig

Beyoncé singles chronology
"Sorry" (2016)	"Hold Up" (2016)	"Freedom" (2016)

Music video
- "Hold Up" on YouTube

"Hold Up" is a song by American singer Beyoncé for her sixth studio album, Lemonade (2016). The song was serviced to Italian radio on May 27, 2016 as the third single from the album. It was written by Diplo, Ezra Koenig, Beyoncé, Emile Haynie, Josh Tillman, MNEK, and MeLo-X.

The song contains a sample of "Can't Get Used to Losing You" performed by Andy Williams and written by Doc Pomus and Mort Shuman, an interpolation of "Maps" performed by the Yeah Yeah Yeahs and written by Brian Chase, Karen O and Nick Zinner, and an interpolation of "Turn My Swag On", written by Soulja Boy, Antonio Randolph, and Kelvin McConnell.

"Hold Up" received a Grammy nomination for Best Pop Solo Performance at the 59th ceremony.

== Composition ==
A reggae song, "Hold Up" is written in the key of C major in common time with a tempo of 84 beats per minute. The song follows a chord progression of C–F–D–G–D–F, and when it comes to Beyonce's vocals, they go from C_{3} to F_{5}. The track features a light reggae beat.

A demo of "Hold Up" – a simple track containing just a chorus – was first written and recorded by Diplo and Ezra Koenig in 2014. Koenig, the frontman of the indie rock band Vampire Weekend, was interested in the opening of "Can't Get Used to Losing You" by Andy Williams, played to him by Diplo, and wrote a hook around it. The lyrics include a slight rewording of the chorus of "Maps" by Yeah Yeah Yeahs that Koenig had tweeted years prior.

Beyoncé, having heard and liked the demo, worked with different songwriters to build the song around it. MNEK said he wrote a full song over the demo, but Beyoncé only made use of 3 lines from his song, which were eventually used in the bridge. He also mentioned the unique process of working with Beyoncé: "The way she works, she is a writer in herself. And then she pieces together stuff and she pieces together, you know, Diplo's going to work on the track; she's going to send it to me to do a melody idea. That's the process. And it worked because she's overlooking everything."

Father John Misty also said Beyoncé contacted him after she heard his song through Emile Haynie. She gave him the simple demo track and he ended up writing the first verse and refrain. He told NME, "With 'Hold Up' they just sent me the beat and the hook. I wrote that first verse and the 'jealous and crazy' part." He didn't know if his part would be used or not but later Beyoncé told him in person that his part made the final cut at his 2015 Coachella set.

In the outro, Beyoncé interpolates the hook from "Turn My Swag On" by Soulja Boy. She used the first two lines of the hook twice with slow falsetto vocals to express the feeling between denial and anger.

== Critical reception ==
Pitchfork's Ryan Dombal named "Hold Up" as "Best New Track", calling Beyoncé's vocals "emotive" and stating "The music has no weight, no place, no time—a calypso dream heard through walls and generations...When Beyoncé works in the pained refrain of Yeah Yeah Yeahs' "Maps," she makes it glorious while allowing our memories to hint at the anguish underneath."

Slant Magazine considered the song the 4th best one of 2016, while Pitchfork named it the 28th best. The song would later be voted in The Village Voice's Pazz & Jop best in music in 2016, the 18th best single of the same period. Billboard ranked "Hold Up" at number 23 on their "100 Best Pop Songs of 2016" list: "Beyonce's Lemonade was designed for memes… and tweets… and gifs. But ask anyone the image that defines the album, and you're likely to see a shot from "Hold Up"." Richard Walker for The National named "Hold Up" the greatest song of the 2010s decade.

== Commercial performance ==
After the release of Lemonade, "Hold Up" debuted and peaked on the US Billboard Hot 100 at number 13 on the chart dating May 14, 2016. "Hold Up" also entered on the Hot R&B/Hip-Hop songs at number 8. In overseas charts, the song entered in multiple digital charts in top 5: Denmark, Greece, Netherlands, New Zealand and Norway.

== Music video ==
The song's music video is part of a one-hour film with the same title as its parent album, which originally aired on HBO and was also included with the purchase of the album itself. The Jonas Åkerlund-directed video features Beyoncé destroying multiple cars and security cameras using a baseball bat. Beyoncé wears a mustard-colored Roberto Cavalli gown which was chosen at the insistence of the director. The video is often compared by critics to that of Janet Jackson's video to her single "Son of a Gun (I Betcha Think This Song Is About You)" as well as the late 90s art film Ever Is Over All by Pipilotti Rist. According to Mashable, Knowles also makes reference of Oshun, the Yoruba goddess of water, fertility, love, and sensuality. The music video received two nominations at the 2016 MTV Video Music Awards for Best Female Video and Best Art Direction, winning the former. One week later, Beyoncé released the music video on her YouTube and Vevo channels.

== Live performances ==
"Hold Up" is part of the set list of the Formation World Tour with the first performance taking place in Miami at Marlins Park on April 27, 2016.

"Hold Up" was also performed as part of a medley of songs from Lemonade at the 2016 MTV Video Music Awards on August 28, 2016, along with "Pray You Catch Me", "Sorry", "Don't Hurt Yourself", and "Formation".

"Hold Up" was performed at Beyoncé's 2018 Coachella performance, reimagined with a marching band to pay homage to historically black colleges and universities.

In 2018, Beyoncé performed the bridge of “Hold Up” after Jay-Z performed “Bam” during the European and first three North American dates of the OTR II Tour, their second co-headlining, all-stadium tour together.

== Charts ==
=== Weekly charts ===
Chart (2016)	Peak position
Australia (ARIA)	25
Australia Urban Singles (ARIA)	1
Belgium (Ultratip Flanders)	11
Canada Hot 100 (Billboard)	37
Canada CHR/Top 40 (Billboard)	49
Denmark Digital Songs (Billboard)	3
Euro Digital Songs (Billboard)	4
Finland Download (Latauslista)	14
France (SNEP)	14
Greece Digital Songs (Billboard)	3
Hungary (Single Top 40)	13
Iceland (RÚV)	2
Ireland (IRMA)	52
Netherlands Digital Songs (Billboard)	1
Netherlands (Dutch Top 40 Tipparade)	2
New Zealand Heatseeker Singles (RMNZ)	1
Norway Digital Songs (Billboard)	3
Scottish Singles Sales (Official Charts)	13
Spain (PROMUSICAE)	37
Sweden (Sverigetopplistan)	77
UK Singles (Official Charts)	11
UK Hip Hop/R&B (Official Charts)	3
US Billboard Hot 100	13
US Hot R&B/Hip-Hop Songs (Billboard)	6
US R&B/Hip-Hop Airplay (Billboard)	7
US Rhythmic Airplay (Billboard)	17

=== Year-end charts ===
Chart (2016)	Position
Australia Urban (ARIA)	21
Belgium (Ultratop Flanders Urban)	45
US Hot R&B/Hip-Hop Songs (Billboard)	48

== Certifications ==
Region	Certification	Certified units/sales
Australia (ARIA)	2× Platinum	140,000^{‡}
Brazil (Pro-Música Brasil)	Platinum	60,000^{‡}
Canada (Music Canada)	Platinum	80,000^{‡}
New Zealand (RMNZ)	Platinum	30,000^{‡}
Poland (ZPAV)	Gold	25,000^{‡}
United Kingdom (BPI)	Platinum	600,000^{‡}
United States (RIAA)	3× Platinum	3,000,000^{‡}
^{‡} Sales+streaming figures based on certification alone.

== Release history ==
"Hold Up" release history
Region	Date	Format(s)	Label(s)	Ref.
Italy	May 27, 2016	Radio airplay	Sony	
United States	August 16, 2016	Rhythmic contemporary radio; urban contemporary radio	Parkwood; Columbia	
