= Lemonade (2016 film) =

2016 film and visual album by Beyoncé

- Promotional poster
- Written by: Warsan Shire
- Directed by: Beyoncé; Kahlil Joseph; Dikayl Rimmasch; Todd Tourso; Jonas Åkerlund; Melina Matsoukas; Mark Romanek
- Starring: Beyoncé
- Music by: Beyoncé
- Composer: MeLo-X
- Country of origin: United States
- Original language: English

Production
- Executive producers: Beyoncé; Todd Tourso; Erinn Williams; Melissa Vargas; Steve Pamon; Ed Burke
- Producers: Onye Anyanwu; Jonathan Lia; Keenan Flynn; Nathan Scherrer; Scott Horan; Thomas Benski; Kira Carstensen; Danyi Deats; Thomas Martin; Violaine Etienne; Michael Garza
- Cinematography: Khalik Allah; Chayse Irvin; Pär Ekberg; Santiago Gonzalez; Malik Sayeed; Dikayl Rimmasch; Reed Morano
- Editor: Bill Yukich
- Running time: 65 minutes
- Production companies: Parkwood Entertainment; Good Company; Pulse Films; Anonymous Content; Pretty Bird; Serial Pictures

Original release
- Network: HBO
- Release: April 23, 2016

Lemonade is a 2016 musical film and visual album by American singer Beyoncé, serving as the visual companion to her 2016 album of the same name. Beyoncé also served as a director and executive producer on the film. It premiered on HBO on April 23, 2016, and was released the same day with the album on CD/DVD, Tidal, and the iTunes Store.

== Premise ==
The film is divided into eleven chapters: "Intuition", "Denial", "Anger", "Apathy", "Emptiness", "Accountability", "Reformation", "Forgiveness", "Resurrection", "Hope", and "Redemption". It incorporates poetry and prose by British-Somali poet Warsan Shire, including adaptations of "The Unbearable Weight of Staying", "Dear Moon", "How to Wear Your Mother's Lipstick", "Nail Technician as Palm Reader", and "For Women Who Are Difficult to Love". According to writer Kyra Gaunt, Lemonade "puts everyone on notice and reminds us that pop culture can carry the gutbucket of a new kind of imagined justice." The film blends music, documentary, and experimental elements, and was directed by seven filmmakers, including Beyoncé.

== Plot ==
The film opens with Beyoncé leaning against a car in a parking garage, her face obscured by her fur coat. It then cuts to a desolate Fort Macomb, interspersed with shots of Beyoncé in a black hoodie among reeds and on an empty stage before closed red curtains.

Intuition: On a plantation, Black women dressed in white stand solemnly as the first poem is recited. These scenes are intercut with Beyoncé standing among reeds in a black hoodie. The chapter includes images of chains and other cinematic signifiers that have been interpreted as references to the initial acknowledgment of Jay-Z's alleged infidelity. The video has been described as offering "a glimpse into Beyoncé's headspace." Beyoncé begins "Pray You Catch Me" in an old metal bathtub. She emerges from a stage onto a rooftop and, as the song ends, leaps from the edge into deep water.

Denial: Floating underwater, Beyoncé unzips her hoodie to reveal a skin-toned bustier. She swims into a grand submerged bedroom, where she encounters a version of herself resting on a bed. After floating and rapidly contorting underwater, she emerges from the bedroom and exits a courthouse onto a street in a flowing yellow ruffled dress as "Hold Up" begins.

Beyoncé walks down a busy city street and picks up a baseball bat. She angrily smashes car windows as onlookers cheer, strikes a fire hydrant that sprays water as children run through it, and breaks a security camera and a storefront window as fire erupts behind her. She approaches the camera menacingly and strikes it before boarding a monster truck, which she uses to crush vintage cars before driving away.

Anger: A high school band and majorettes parade down a suburban street. In an abandoned parking garage, women in long white dresses dance in unison with their sleeves tied to one another. A lone female drummer plays as dancers dressed in black approach an SUV. A ring of fire is lit as "Don't Hurt Yourself" begins.

Beyoncé, wearing cornrows, a tight gray tank top and leggings, and a fur coat, sings aggressively. The song is interrupted by Malcolm X's speech "Who Taught You to Hate Yourself?", in which he states that the most disrespected person in America is the Black woman. The song resumes with shots of Beyoncé wandering the parking garage in a wedding dress and sitting in the ring of fire in a red dress. An intertitle declares "GOD IS GOD AND I AM NOT" before she throws her wedding ring at the camera.

Apathy: On a bus, dancers in tribal paint and traditionally African braided hairstyles dance in unison as Beyoncé looks on solemnly. She then recites a spoken-word poem about infidelity over the slow melody of a jewelry box playing a theme from Pyotr Ilyich Tchaikovsky's ballet Swan Lake. In a plantation mansion, Serena Williams wanders the halls and dances in front of Beyoncé as Beyoncé sings "Sorry". The song ends with Beyoncé sitting cross-legged in an empty room, dressed in a metallic bra set and wearing hair braided to resemble Nefertiti's crown. Naked women wander a field as the film fades to black.

Emptiness: "Dear Moon" is recited over images of a plantation mansion bathed in an eerie blood-red glow. The camera slowly zooms in on a windowed door as the thumping beat of "6 Inch" begins, cutting to Beyoncé riding in a vintage Cadillac at night. In another scene, she stands in a room surrounded by women dressed in black while swinging a lightbulb above her head. The word "LOSS" flashes as the window bursts into flames. Beyoncé dances seductively on a stage behind glass, intercut with scenes of her lying on a bed in a grand white dress and walking down a hallway as it begins to burn. The song ends with Beyoncé and a group of people standing outside the mansion as it burns behind them.

Accountability: Little girls run around and play in a mansion while a mother and daughter sit in a bedroom. The film cuts to an interview with a man recounting his experience meeting then-President Obama as he drives through a storm. The interview is intercut with Super 8 footage of the man with his family in a New Orleans neighborhood. The film returns to a tunnel in Fort Macomb as Beyoncé sings "Daddy Lessons" and plays guitar. The song is interrupted by childhood home videos of Beyoncé and her father, Mathew Knowles, as well as videos of him playing with his granddaughter Blue Ivy. It then resumes with more footage of life in New Orleans, including families playing and a jazz funeral. The song has been interpreted as a reflection on how Beyoncé's relationship with her father influenced her marriage and her daughter's relationship with him. Writer Lethabo Malatiji wrote that the song involves Beyoncé resolving her relationship with her father and examining how his marriage affected her own.

Reformation: Beyoncé lies in an empty playing field in the Mercedes-Benz Superdome, the site of her performance at Super Bowl XLVII, as "Love Drought" begins. The film cuts to women dressed in white walking in a line into the ocean, alluding to Igbo Landing, where captured Africans are said to have chosen drowning over slavery. CBS News wrote that, as a guest performer at the Super Bowl halftime show, Beyoncé used the global stage to present a political message about racism and police brutality.

Forgiveness: In a sparsely furnished house, Beyoncé plays "Sandcastles" on the piano, intercut with scenes of a child's drawings, wilted flowers, decorative objects, and a fireplace. She sings to Jay-Z as they caress and embrace each other.

Resurrection: Black women dressed in white gather in a historic park. "Forward" begins as Black women hold up pictures of deceased relatives, including the mothers of Black men whose deaths galvanized the Black Lives Matter movement. A Mardi Gras Indian circles a dining room table while shaking a tambourine.

Hope: "Freedom" begins with Beyoncé singing the first verse a cappella on an outdoor stage at night. A dancer performs during the instrumental break, intercut with footage of women sitting under a large willow tree, sharing a communal dinner, and Winnie Harlow wearing a crown of thorns.

Redemption: Beyoncé recites the final poem as Black women care for themselves in the mansion. The film cuts to footage of Jay-Z's grandmother, Hattie White, celebrating her 90th birthday and speaking about overcoming hardship, explaining that she was served lemons but made lemonade. Women on a plantation come together and tend a communal garden as the final song, "All Night", begins. Beyoncé returns to Fort Macomb at sunset in an elaborate dress and sings over joyful footage of families, couples, and home videos of herself with Jay-Z and her family.

The film concludes with the music video for "Formation".

== Cast ==
The film's cast features Ibeyi, Laolu Senbanjo, Amandla Stenberg, Quvenzhané Wallis, Chloe x Halle, Zendaya, and Serena Williams. In "Forward", the mothers of Trayvon Martin (Sybrina Fulton), Michael Brown (Lesley McFadden), and Eric Garner (Gwen Carr) appear holding pictures of their deceased sons. Jay-Z and Beyoncé's daughter, Blue Ivy, appears in home video footage, as do Jay-Z's grandmother Hattie White and Beyoncé's mother, Tina Knowles, who is shown with her second husband, Richard Lawson, on their wedding day in 2015.

== Reception ==
=== Critical response ===
Lemonade draws from the prolific literary, musical, cinematic, and aesthetic sensibilities of black cultural producers to create a rich tapestry of poetic innovation. The audacity of its reach and fierceness of its vision challenges our cultural imagination, while crafting a stunning and sublime masterpiece about the lives of women of color and the bonds of friendship seldom seen or heard in American popular culture.

— Peabody Entertainment Awards on Lemonade.

On review aggregator Rotten Tomatoes, the film holds an approval rating of 100% based on 6 reviews. Miriam Bale of Billboard called Lemonade "a revolutionary work of Black feminism" and described it as "a movie made by a black woman, starring Black women, and for Black women", in which Beyoncé gathers, unites, and leads Black women throughout the film. In addition to tracing Beyoncé's relationship with her husband, Lemonade has been interpreted as chronicling the relationship between Black women and American society, including the ways the United States has betrayed and mistreated Black women. Critics have also noted that the film centers the experiences of Black women in ways seldom seen in media and celebrates their achievements despite the adversity they face.

In June 2016, Matthew Fulks sued Beyoncé, Sony Music, Columbia Records, and Parkwood Entertainment, alleging that the trailer for Lemonade copied nine visual elements from his short film Palinoia. The lawsuit was later dismissed by New York federal judge Jed S. Rakoff, who ruled in favor of the defendants.

=== Accolades ===
Year	Award	Category	Nominee(s)	Result	Ref.
2016	African-American Film Critics Association Awards	Best TV Show – Special or Limited Series	Lemonade	Won	
2016	Primetime Emmy Awards	Outstanding Variety Special	Beyoncé Knowles-Carter, Todd Tourso, Erinn Williams, Dora Melissa Vargas, Steve Pamon, and Ed Burke (Lemonade)	Nominated	
2016	Primetime Emmy Awards	Outstanding Directing for a Variety Special	Kahlil Joseph and Beyoncé Knowles-Carter (Lemonade)	Nominated	
2016	Primetime Emmy Awards	Outstanding Picture Editing for a Variety Special	Bill Yukich (Lemonade)	Nominated	
2016	Primetime Emmy Awards	Outstanding Production Design for a Variety, Nonfiction, Event or Award Special	Hannah Beachler, Chris Britt and Kim Murphy (Lemonade)	Nominated	
2017	Grammy Awards	Best Music Video	Beyoncé Knowles-Carter, Melina Matsoukas and Nathan Scherrer ("Formation")	Won	
2017	Grammy Awards	Best Music Film	Beyoncé Knowles-Carter, Kahlil Joseph, Ed Burke, Steve Pamon, Todd Tourso, Dora Melissa Vargas, and Erinn Williams (Lemonade)	Nominated	
2017	Black Reel Television Awards	Outstanding Television Documentary or Special	Beyoncé Knowles-Carter and Kahlil Joseph (Lemonade)	Won	
