= Arrow Benjamin =

- Born: Dean McIntosh; Brixton, London, England
- Other name: Arrow Benjamin
- Occupations: Singer; songwriter
- Years active: 2015–present
- Musical career
- Genres: R&B; pop
- Instruments: Vocals; piano
- Labels: Virgin EMI; Island
- Website: arrowbenjamin.com

Dean McIntosh, known professionally as Arrow Benjamin, is an English singer and songwriter. He is known for collaborating with Naughty Boy and Beyoncé on the track "Runnin' (Lose It All)". Benjamin also co-wrote and performed backing vocals on the song "Freedom" for Beyoncé's 2016 album Lemonade. Benjamin has also written songs for artists such as Major Lazer, Rudimental and Labrinth. He released his debut solo single, "Look at Me", on 16 October 2016.

== Discography ==
=== Extended plays ===
List of extended plays
Title	Album details
W.A.R. (We All Rise)	Released: TBA; Label: [Live VYNL], Virgin EMI, Island; Formats: TBA

=== Singles ===
Title	Year	Peak chart positions										Certifications	Album
Title	Year	UK	AUS	FRA	GER	ITA	IRE	NL	SPA	SWI	US	Certifications	Album
"Runnin' (Lose It All)" (Naughty Boy featuring Beyoncé and Arrow Benjamin)	2015	4	22	1	85	59	12	19	9	23	90	BPI: 2× Platinum; FIMI: Gold; RMNZ: Gold	TBA
"Look at Me"	2015	—	—	—	—	—	—	—	—	—	—		Non-album singles
"Love and Hate"	2016	—	—	—	—	—	—	—	—	—	—		Non-album singles
"Moments" (Youthonix featuring Arrow Benjamin)	2016	—	—	—	—	—	—	—	—	—	—		One Beat at a Time
"Love Vendetta"	2018	—	—	—	—	—	—	—	—	—	—		TBA
"Sirens"	2020	—	—	—	—	—	—	—	—	—	—		TBA
"—" denotes a title that did not chart, or was not released in that territory.
