= Tignon law =

1786 Louisiana law

The Tignon Law was part of a larger edict enacted by the Spanish Governor of Louisiana Esteban Rodríguez Miró on June 2, 1786 and required free women of color to wear the same headscarves or wraps worn by enslaved women and later referred to as tignons. The word tignon itself does not appear in the edict, and it does not appear to have entered the local or vernacular Louisiana Creole lexicon until later; the earliest printed instances date to the second half of the nineteenth century.

Portrait of a free woman of color by François Fleischbein, dated 1837. The Historic New Orleans Collection.

== Background ==
Sumptuary laws that placed restrictions on dress and adornment according to rank or race were not uncommon in the eighteenth century. The Code Noir, or black code, was a French law that restricted the lives of people of color living in French colonies. It had first been created to apply in the Caribbean colonies in 1685 but was extended to Louisiana in 1724 and included sumptuary components. Spanish authorities instituted similar laws, first in 1769 and again in 1778.

Although their political rights were limited, a growing community of free people of color in New Orleans had managed to accrue considerable social influence and economic capital by the late eighteenth century. Their activities as well as their appearance provoked anxiety among whites keen to maintain and further entrench racial distinctions. With respect to free women of color specifically, Miró and other Spanish colonial officials eventually sought to curb what they viewed as "too much luxury in their bearing."

== Law ==
At its core, Miró's 1786 edict aimed to regulate morality and reinforce a social hierarchy built along racialized lines, thereby laying the groundwork for the oppressive and racist legal frameworks that would come to define the antebellum American South. Formally titled the bando de buen gobierno or "proclamation of good government," the decree included provisions stipulating that "the Negras Mulatas, y quarteronas can no longer have feathers nor jewelry in their hair. [Instead, they] must wear [their hair] plain (Ilanos) or wear pañuelos, if they are of higher status, as they have been accustomed to." The edict refers specifically to pañuelos or handkerchiefs, which were often worn by enslaved women. By ordering free women of color to don a headcovering associated with slavery, Miró's edict sought to stifle their visibility and social autonomy.

== Effect ==
Little written evidence exists regarding the initial effect and actual enforcement of Miró's decree governing non-white women's headcoverings. However, beginning in the 1780s, if not earlier, fashionable white women on both sides of the Atlantic also wore knotted kerchiefs and turbans of the sort eventually referred to as tignons in Louisiana. Popularized by Empress Joséphine of France and First Lady Dolley Madison, these exotic accessories decreased in popularity by the 1830s.

Virginia Gould writes that the true purpose of the "tignon law" was to control women of color "who dressed too elegantly, or who, in reality competed too freely with white women for status and thus threatened the social order." Acknowledging the lack of evidence for the law's enforcement, she asserts that the headdress in question was eventually refashioned by free women of color as a "mark of distinction." Although they postdate the period of Spanish colonial rule, early nineteenth-century Louisiana portraits of free women of color wearing cloth headwraps in various styles are often cited as evidence to support this claim.

== In popular culture ==
Contemporary discussions often analyze the "tignon law" in isolation rather than as one component of Governor Miró’s broader 1786 edict. This fragmented view has fostered anachronistic interpretations, feeding into a larger phenomenon of romanticized myth-making that at times exaggerates and oversimplifies the complexities of Louisiana Creole culture as well as race in early America.

Historically, white media has weaponized images of black women in headscarves, including the Aunt Jemima stereotype, to propel racist narratives of ugliness, submission, and servile status. In the 1960s and 1970s, Nina Simone and Angela Davis were known for wearing headwraps as a statement of resistance against racial discrimination and injustice and as a reclamation of black beauty, pride, and culture. During the 1990s and early 2000s, artists such as Lauryn Hill, India Arie, and Erykah Badu to name a few showcased the reclamation of the headscarf as a beauty and cultural symbol. From fashion designers, celebrities, to media influencers, they have displayed the versatility of the once law-abiding tool now stylish accessory that can be worn in various ways to accentuate an outfit and assisting with protection while sleeping.

Publications such as Essence and Vice have discussed the law and its effects.

== See also ==
- Sumptuary law
- Crown Act
- Title VII jurisprudence
