= Don't Hurt Yourself (Beyoncé song) =

2016 song by Beyoncé featuring Jack White

Song by Beyoncé featuring Jack White

from the album Lemonade
- Released: April 22, 2016
- Studio: Jungle Studios, New York City
- Genre: Blues rock; hard rock; psychedelic rock
- Length: 3:54
- Label: Parkwood; Columbia
- Songwriters: Jack White; Beyoncé; Diana Gordon; Robert Plant; James Page; John Paul Jones; John Bonham
- Producers: Jack White; Beyoncé

Audio
- "Don't Hurt Yourself" on YouTube

"Don't Hurt Yourself" is a song by American singer Beyoncé featuring American musician Jack White. It is the third track on her sixth studio album, Lemonade (2016), released through Parkwood Entertainment and Columbia Records. The song's music video is part of Beyoncé's 2016 film Lemonade, aired on HBO alongside the album's release.

The blues rock, hard rock, and psychedelic rock song was produced by Jack White, Beyoncé, and Derek Dixie, and written by White, Beyoncé, and Diana Gordon. The song contains samples of "When the Levee Breaks" written by Jimmy Page, Robert Plant, John Paul Jones, and John Bonham, and performed by Led Zeppelin. Some critics compared the song to Beyoncé's "Ring the Alarm" (2006). The song received a nomination for the 59th Annual Grammy Awards in the category of Best Rock Performance. Billboard ranked "Don't Hurt Yourself" at number 61 on their "Billboard's 100 Best Pop Songs of 2016" list.

== Background ==
Jack White said of the song's origin in an NPR interview:

"You know, I just talked to her and she said, "I wanna be in a band with you." [Laughs.] I said, "Really? Well, I'd love to do something." I've always loved her voice — I mean, I think she has the kind of soul singing voice of the days of Betty Davis or Aretha Franklin. She took just sort of a sketch of a lyrical outline and turned into the most bodacious, vicious, incredible song. I don't even know what you'd classify it as — soul, rock and roll, whatever. "Don't Hurt Yourself" is incredibly intense; I'm so amazed at what she did with it."

The song's music video is part of a one-hour film with the same title as its parent album, which originally aired on HBO.

== Critical reception ==
Writing for Pitchfork, Jillian Mapes argues that Beyoncé is "giving the world a modern-day 'Respect' in 'Don't Hurt Yourself'". Mapes continues, writing "Even on an album stacked with some of Beyoncé's best recorded vocal performances to date, 'Don't Hurt Yourself' has her belting to a whole other dimension—specifically, that of Janis Joplin and late-'60s Tina Turner". Amber Mackie of Revolt stresses that the song follows "Hold Up" narration with "no nonsense lyrics", with "energy and power" from "propulsive rhythms and fills of the drums".

In 2021 Alexis Petridis ranking the "Beyoncé's 30 greatest songs" placed the song at 28, describing it as "rock/funk hybrid about Lemonade’s most aggressive track" and stressing that the Homecoming: The Live Album version "amps things up even further".

== Chart performance ==
After the release of Lemonade, "Don't Hurt Yourself" debuted on the Billboard Hot 100 at number 28 on the chart dating May 14, 2016. It also debuted and peaked on the Hot R&B/Hip-Hop songs chart at number 16. As featured artist on the song, Jack White notched his first solo top 40 Hot 100 hit. In a prior appearance as a soloist, White reached number 81 in 2008 with the duet "Another Way to Die" with Alicia Keys, the theme from the James Bond film Quantum of Solace.

== Live performances ==
"Don't Hurt Yourself" was part of the set list for The Formation World Tour with the first performance taking place in Miami at Marlins Park on April 27, 2016. Beyoncé also performed this as part of her medley at the 2016 MTV VMA. Writing for The Guardian, Caroline Sullivan noted how during the performance of "the bitterest songs" off Lemonade, "Sorry" and "Don't Hurt Yourself", "she's a pillar of rage". Beyoncé also performed the song on her setlist for her 2018 Coachella performance, as well as co-headlining On the Run II Tour with Jay-Z. Jack White opened his October 10, 2020 performance on Saturday Night Live with a portion of "Don't Hurt Yourself" as part of a medley.

== Charts ==
Chart (2016)	Peak position
Australia (ARIA)	93
Australia Urban Singles (ARIA)	10
Canada Hot 100 (Billboard)	53
France (SNEP)	47
Scottish Singles Sales (Official Charts)	30
Sweden (Sverigetopplistan)	77
UK Singles (Official Charts)	36
UK Hip Hop/R&B (Official Charts)	12
US Billboard Hot 100	28
US Hot R&B/Hip-Hop Songs (Billboard)	16

== Certifications ==
Region	Certification	Certified units/sales
United Kingdom (BPI)	Silver	200,000^{‡}
United States (RIAA)	Platinum	1,000,000^{‡}
^{‡} Sales+streaming figures based on certification alone.
