= Tignon =

Head scarf worn by Creole women of African descent

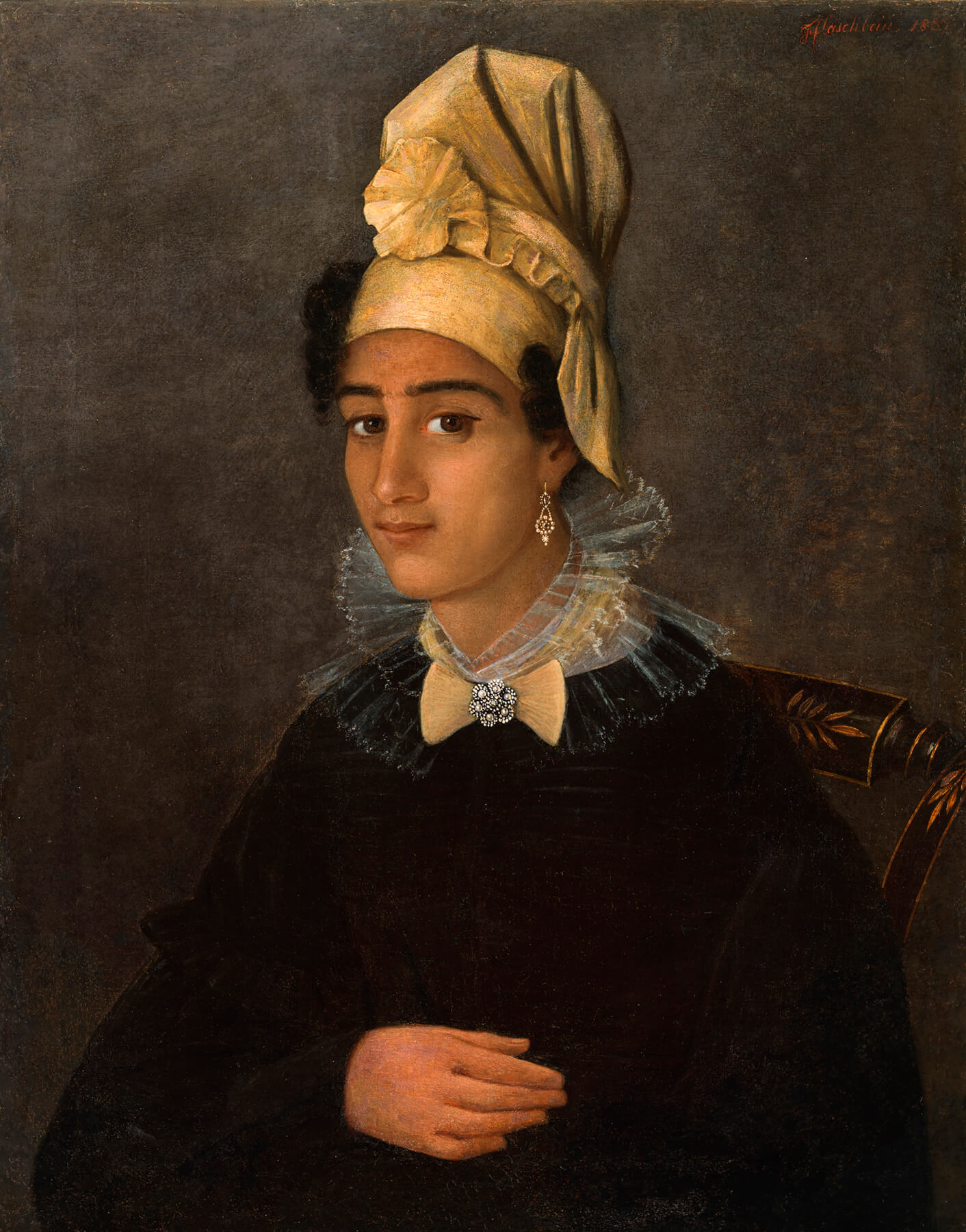
Free Woman of Color (c. 1837) by François Fleischbein. The Historic New Orleans Collection.

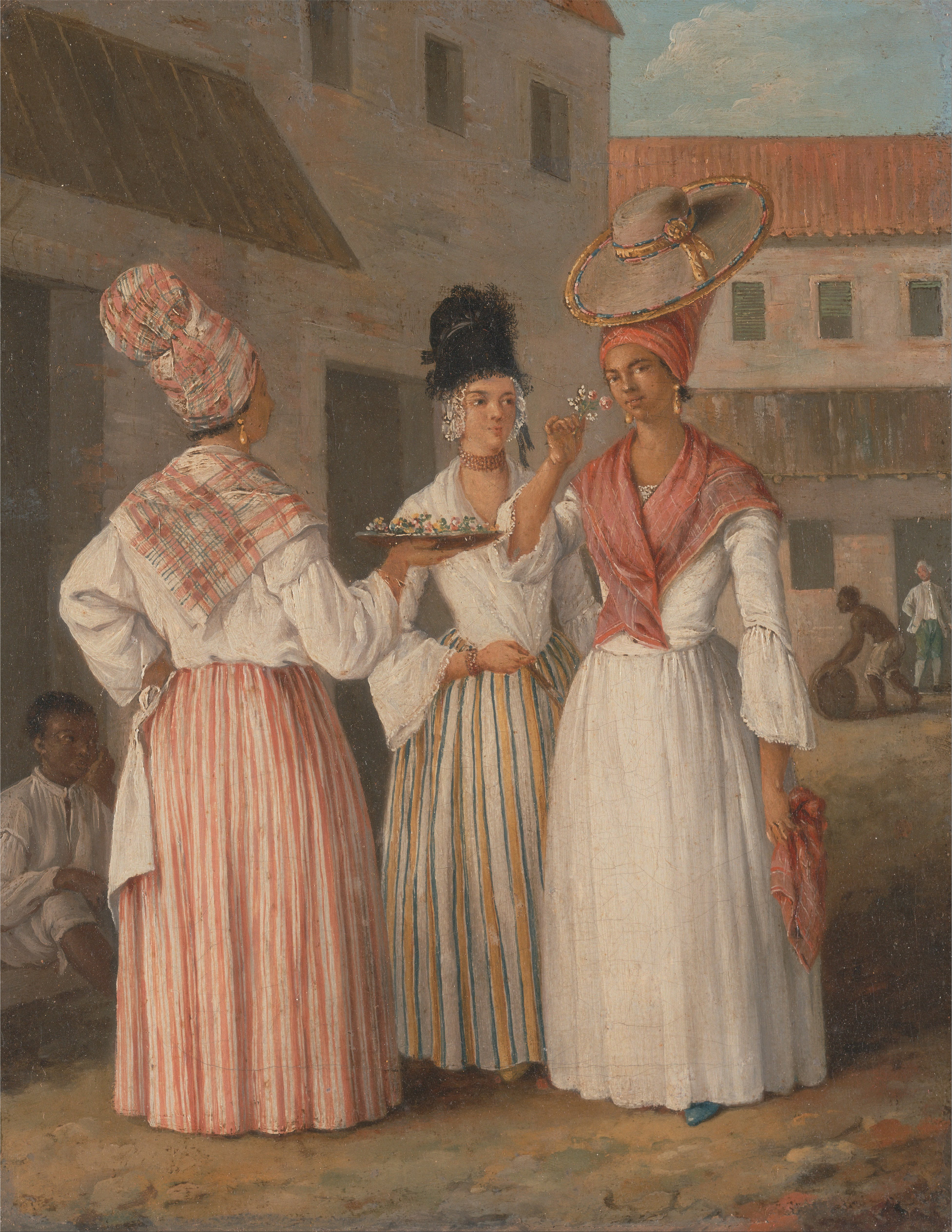
A West Indian Flower Girl and Two Other Free Women of Color (c. 1769) by Agostino Brunias. Yale Center for British Art.

A tignon (also spelled and pronounced tiyon) is a type of headcovering—a large piece of material tied or wrapped around the head to form a kind of turban that somewhat resembles the West African gele. It was worn by Creole women of African descent in Louisiana beginning in the Spanish colonial period, continuing to a lesser extent to the present day.

== Tignon law ==
This cloth headdress is largely associated with a sumptuary law passed in 1786 under the administration of Louisiana Governor Esteban Rodriguez Miró. Actually part of a larger edict centered on reinforcing racial hierarchy and social order in New Orleans, the so-called tignon law targeted the gens de couleur. Free women of color were ordered to stop adorning their hair with plumes and jewels, and either wear their hair plainly or covered with a cloth. The extent to which this ruling was ever actually enforced is not known.

Historian Virginia M. Gould notes that Miró hoped the law would control women "who had become too light skinned or who dressed too elegantly, or who, in reality, competed too freely with white women for status and thus threatened the social order".

== Afro-Créole protest ==
Miró's intent of having the tignon mark inferiority had a somewhat different effect according to historian Carolyn Long who noted: "Instead of being considered a badge of dishonor, the tignon ... became a fashion statement. The bright reds, blues, and yellows of the scarves, and the imaginative wrapping techniques employed by their wearers, are said to have enhanced the beauty of the women of color." In other words, "[t]hey effectively re-interpreted the law without technically breaking the law"—and they continued to be pursued by men.

Although the law was intended to reinforce racial differences, the adoption of the cloth headwraps known as mouchoirs and turban-like accessories by Empress Josephine and First Lady Dolley Madison made it stylish for white women, as well as women of color, to wear their hair "in the Creole style." In the early 19th century, the turban was associated with French fashion, which appropriated styles from a variety of cultures, and with a sense of "Frenchness".

== Tignons past and present ==
The tignon can be wrapped in many ways, and it was and is worn in a different way by every woman. Madras was a popular fabric for tignons among both free and enslaved populations, and has become iconic. Tignons were often created out of mis-matched scraps of undyed fabric given to slaves by their masters. The patchwork of material was made to appear festive. Tignons worn by free women of color or enslaved women in Haiti, Martinique, Guadeloupe, Saint Lucia and Dominica, were made from Madras fabric, and even had hidden messages.

The tignon is experiencing a revival in Louisiana. It is found particularly in Creole-themed weddings. Celebrities such as Erykah Badu and Jill Scott continue to wear headdresses, as a celebration of Afro-American culture.

== See also ==
- Head tie
