= 2024 in hip-hop =

This article summarizes the events, album releases, and album release dates in hip-hop for the year 2024.

== Events ==
=== January ===
- In January, Snoop Dogg filed for dismissal of a 1993 murder case. He was acquitted on all charges in February.
- On January 2, the 33rd Seoul Music Awards were held. NCT Dream won the Grand Award. Dynamic Duo won the R&B Hiphop Award. Blackpink won the World Best Artist Award.
- On January 3, T.I. and his wife, Tiny, were sued for allegations of drugging and sexual assault from a 2005 incident.
- On January 8, the trial for YFN Lucci on RICO charges began.
- On January 9, Duane Davis was granted a $750,000 bond and put on house arrest until his trial for the murder of Tupac Shakur, which was set for November 4, 2024.
- On January 13, Yo Gotti's brother Big Jook was shot and killed after attending his uncle's funeral in Memphis, Tennessee.
- On January 15, Rick Ross received the key to Miami, Florida.
- On January 17, six men were convicted for the murder of FBG Duck, who was killed in August 2020 in Chicago, Illinois.
- On January 18, 6ix9ine was arrested for allegedly assaulting his girlfriend in Santo Domingo.
- On January 23, the trial for Patrick Xavier Clarke on charges involved with the murder of Takeoff began. On the same day, YFN Lucci accepted a plea deal from prosecutors in the YSL RICO case.
- On January 29, the trial for two men charged with the murder of Jam Master Jay began. On the same day, Fredo was sentenced to five years in jail for possession of cannabis in Dubai.

=== February ===
- On February 1, DaniLeigh was charged with 5 years probation after a DUI hit and run in Miami, Florida.
- On February 4, the 66th Annual Grammy Awards were held. Killer Mike won Best Rap Performance and Best Rap Song for "Scientists & Engineers" alongside André 3000, Future & Eryn Allen Kane, and the Best Rap Album with Michael. Lil Durk and J. Cole won the Best Melodic Rap Performance for their respective song "All My Life". Killer Mike was later detained due to an unrelated incident that same day.
- On February 6, Pablo Grant died at the age of 26. On the same day, Quando Rondo was charged with driving under the influence and reckless driving in Savannah, Georgia.
- On February 13, Eddie Cheeba died at the age of 67.
- On February 16, Bing Worthington died at the age of 44.
- On February 17, the 31st Hanteo Music Awards were held. NCT Dream won Best Artist. Stray Kids won Best Performance. Tempest won the Emerging Artist Award. B.I won the Hip-hop Special award. Ateez won Top Global Performer.
- On February 22, the 36th Lo Nuestro Awards were held. Feid won Male Urban Artist of the Year. "Classy 101" by Feid & Young Miko won Urban Song of the Year.
- On February 25, Bigidagoe was shot and killed in Amsterdam.
- On February 27, Beenzino won Artist of the Year at the Korean Hip-hop Awards. On the same day, Karl Jordan Jr. and Ronald Washington were found guilty for the murder of Jam Master Jay.

=== March ===
- On March 2, the Brit Awards 2024 were held. Casisdead won Best Hip Hop/Grime/Rap Act.
- On March 3, Presto died at the age of 31.
- On March 11, Boss died at the age of 54.
- On March 16, the 55th NAACP Image Awards were held. Megan Thee Stallion won Outstanding Hip Hop/Rap Song for "Cobra".
- On March 19, Dr. Dre received a star on the Hollywood Walk of Fame.
- On March 22, the Drake–Kendrick Lamar feud officially began, following the release of "Like That". On the same day, the 2024 Global Awards were held. Cassö, Raye, and D-Block Europe won Best Song for "Prada". Central Cee won Best RnB or Hip Hop.
- On March 24, Def Rhymz died at the age of 53. On the same day, the Juno Awards of 2024 were held. TOBi won Rap Album/EP of the Year for Panic and Rap Single of the Year for "Someone I Knew".
- On March 25, Diddy's house in Holmby Hills, California was raided by the United States Department of Homeland Security on allegations of sex trafficking.
- On March 30, Casey Benjamin died at the age of 45.

=== April ===
- On April 1, the 2024 iHeartRadio Music Awards were held. Drake won Hip-Hop Artist of the Year. Ice Spice won Best New Hip-Hop Artist. Lil Durk and J. Cole won Hip-Hop Song of the Year for "All My Life". Young Miko won Best New Latin Artist. Metro Boomin won Hip Hop Album of the Year for Heroes & Villains.
- On April 3, Rod Wave was arrested in Manatee, Florida for illegal possession of a firearm.
- On April 5, Keith LeBlanc died at the age of 69.
- On April 6, Dutty Dior died at the age of 27.
- On April 10, Mister Cee died at the age of 57.
- On April 12, producer Rico Wade of Organized Noize died at the age of 52.
- On April 15, Yungeen Ace was arrested in Jacksonville Beach, Florida for possession of a firearm by a convicted felon, and was released on bond the following day.
- On April 16, NBA YoungBoy was arrested in Cache County, Utah on 63 charges, including drug possession, forgery, identity fraud, and weapons possession.
- On April 17, GloRilla was arrested for DUI in Atlanta, Georgia.
- On April 19, the Drake–Kendrick Lamar feud: Drake releases "Push Ups" and "Taylor Made Freestyle".
- On April 20, Chris King was shot and killed in Nashville, Tennessee.
- On April 21, MC Duke died at the age of 58.
- On April 24, Toomaj Salehi was sentenced to death for participating in the Mahsa Amini protests.
- On April 27, the 18th Metro FM Music Awards were held. A-Reece won Best Hip Hop for "Ving Rhames".
- On April 30, MC Conrad died at the age of 52.

=== May ===
- On May 1, the APRA Music Awards of 2024 were held. Onefour and Cg won Most Performed Hip Hop / Rap Work for "Comma's". On the same day, Lil Tjay was arrested for a warrant in Opa-locka, Florida.
- On May 2, Mariah the Scientist was arrested for assault in Atlanta, Georgia.
- On May 23, Sean Kingston was arrested in Fort Irwin, California after his Dania Beach, Florida mansion was raided.

=== June ===
- On June 1, the 2024 Ghana Music Awards were held. Black Sherif won Best Hiplife/Hip Hop Artist of the Year. Sarkodie won Best Hip Hop Song of The Year for "Otan".
- On June 3, Brother Marquis of 2 Live Crew died at the age of 58.
- On June 4, C.Gambino was shot and killed at the age of 26.
- On June 10, the 2024 Libera Awards were held. Killer Mike won Best Hip-Hop/Rap Record for Michael.
- On June 11, Enchanting died at the age of 26.
- On June 22, Toomaj Salehi's death sentence was overturned by the Supreme Court of Iran.
- On June 23, Foolio was shot and killed at the age of 26, in Tampa, Florida.
- On June 24, XXL released their 2024 Freshman Class, featuring BigXthaPlug, That Mexican OT, Lay Bankz, BossMan Dlow, Rich Amiri, ScarLip, Hunxho, 4Batz, Maiya the Don, Cash Cobain, and Skilla Baby. On the same day, Shifty Shellshock died at the age of 49.
- On June 30, the BET Awards 2024 were held. Killer Mike won Album of the Year for Michael. Lil Durk and J. Cole won Best Collaboration for "All My Life". Nicki Minaj won Best Female Hip Hop Artist. Kendrick Lamar won Best Male Hip Hop Artist. ¥$ won Best Group.

=== July ===
- On July 8, RBX and DJ Clark Kent beef goes into overdrive, as DJ Clark Kent blocks RBX on Instagram for the release of his diss track titled "The Shivers".
- On July 12, J. Saul Kane died at the age of 57.
- On July 23, Devon died at the age of 61. On the same day, the trial for the murder of PnB Rock began.
- On July 24, Malome Vector died at the age of 32.
- On July 27, DJ Polo of the Juice Crew died.
- On July 28, Chino XL died at the age of 50.
- On July 29, the suspects involved with the murder of Foolio were arrested in Jacksonville, Florida.

=== August ===
- On August 1, the AIR Awards of 2024 were held. Genesis Owusu won Best Independent Hip Hop Album or EP for Struggler.
- On August 7, Freddie Trone and Tremont Jones were found guilty for the murder of PnB Rock.
- On August 13, Quincy Hombre was found guilty and sentenced to 23 years in prison for the murder of Chinx.
- On August 15, BeatKing died at the age of 39 from a pulmonary embolism, in Houston, Texas.
- On August 31, Fatman Scoop died at the age of 56, in Hartford, Connecticut.

=== September ===
- On September 2, GloRilla received the key to Memphis, Tennessee.
- On September 5, Rich Homie Quan died at the age of 34, in Atlanta, Georgia.
- On September 11, the 2024 MTV Video Music Awards were held. Eminem won Best Hip Hop for "Houdini".
- On September 17, Diddy was arrested in Manhattan for sex trafficking and racketeering charges.
- On September 19, Nelly was sued by his former group, the St. Lunatics, for copyright infringement, unpaid royalties and lack of credit, seeking $50 million in damages.
- On September 23, the trial for Justin Johnson and Cornelius Smith on charges involved with the murder of Young Dolph began.
- On September 24, Cat Glover died at the age of 62.

=== October ===
- On October 10, Dr. Dre was sued by a marriage counselor on charges of harassment for $10 million.
- On October 12, Ka died at the age of 52.
- On October 15, the 2024 BET Hip Hop Awards were held. Kendrick Lamar won Hip Hop Artist of the Year, Lyricist of the Year, Best Featured Verse for "Like That", and Song of the Year, Impact Track, and Best Hip Hop Video for "Not Like Us". Dave Free & Kendrick Lamar won Video Director of the Year. Future, Metro Boomin & Kendrick Lamar won Best Collaboration for "Like That". Future & Metro Boomin won Best Duo/Group. Nicki Minaj won Album of the Year for Pink Friday 2. Missy Elliott won Best Live Performer. The Alchemist won DJ of the Year and Producer of the Year. Sexyy Red won Best Breakthrough Hip Hop Artist. 50 Cent won Hustler of the Year. Club Shay Shay won Best Hip-Hop Platform. Ghetts won Best International Flow.
- On October 19, Ralan Styles was killed at the age of 22.
- On October 24, DJ Clark Kent died at the age of 58. On the same day, the 2024 Music Victoria Awards were held. Fly Boy Jack won Best Hip Hop Work. On the same day, the 2024 UK Music Video Awards were held. AntsLive won Best Hip Hop/Grime/Rap Video – UK and Best Performance in a Video for "Captain Ants" and Best Hip Hop / Grime / Rap Video – Newcomer for "Cutlery". Free Nationals, A$AP Rocky, and Anderson .Paak won Best Hip Hop/Grime/Rap Video – International for "Gangsta". RM won Best Production Design in a Video for "Lost!". Lil Dicky won Best Cinematography in a Video for "HAHAHA". Fred again.., Anderson .Paak, and Chika won Best Live Video for "Places to Be". On the same day, Lil Durk was arrested on federal murder-for-hire charges along with 5 other Only The Family affiliates in connection to the shooting of Quando Rondo's cousin Lul Pab.
- On October 31, Young Thug was released from prison after 2 years with a plea deal.

=== November ===
- On November 2, the 30th Annual South African Music Awards were held. Priddy Ugly won Best Hip Hop Album for Dust.
- On November 3, the 46th Félix Awards were held. Souldia won Rap Album of the Year for Non conventionnel.
- On November 10, the 2024 MTV Europe Music Awards were held. Eminem won Best Hip-Hop.
- On November 16, the 2024 Korea Grand Music Awards were held. Lee Young-ji won Best Hip-Hop. On the same day, at Camp Flog Gnaw, a teaser trailer was played for Mac Miller's second posthumous album.
- On November 19, Saafir died at the age of 54.
- On November 20, the 2024 ARIA Music Awards were held. 3% won Best Hip Hop/Rap Release for Kill the Dead.
- On November 21, the 2024 MAMA Awards were held. Zico and Jennie won Best Rap & Hip Hop Performance for "Spot!". On the same day, the Myx Music Awards 2024 were held. Al James and Flow G won Hip-Hop Video of the Year for "Atin-Atin Lang". On the same day, Mac Miller's team officially announced his second posthumous album, titled Balloonerism.
- On November 25, Drake filed a petition against Universal Music Group alleging they violated the RICO Act by using illegal tactics to boost streams for Kendrick Lamar's diss track "Not Like Us". On the same day, the trial for Slowthai and co-defendant Alex Blake-Walker on two rape charges began.

=== December ===
- On December 2, Eminem's mother Debbie Nelson died at the age of 69.
- On December 12, the 2024 Billboard Music Awards were held. Drake won Top Rap Artist, Top Rap Male Artist, Top Rap Album for For All the Dogs. Doja Cat won Top Rap Female Artist. Travis Scott won Top Rap Touring Artist. Kendrick Lamar won Top Rap Song for "Not Like Us".
- On December 11, Rio da Yung OG was released from prison after serving three years of his five-year sentence.
- On December 16, after a three-week trial, Slowthai and his co-defendant, Alex Blake-Walker, were found not guilty of three joint counts of rape during an alleged incident in September 2021. Blake-Walker was also cleared of one additional sexual assault charge.
- On December 19, Gaboro was shot and killed.
- On December 23, Lil Shine was charged with conspiracy to acquire and obtain controlled substances by fraud, 11 counts of wire fraud, and 4 counts of aggravated identity theft.
- On December 26, OG Maco died by suicide at the age of 32.

== Released albums ==
=== January ===
Day	Artist(s)	Album	Record label(s)	Entering chart position
1	03 Greedo	Fucc Everybody	Self-released	
1	Dizzy Wright	Trial and Error	Still Movin Music	
1	The Game & Big Hit	Paisley Dreams	Surf Club, STB Entertainment	
4	RXKNephew	7200 Nights	CrackRock Records	
5	NLE Choppa & DJ Booker	The Chosen Ones	Warner Records, No Love Entertainment	
5	Ufo361	Sony	Epic Records	
5	Young Noble	Positive Vibes Only	Outlaw Recordz	
7	Bumpy Knuckles	Level Up	Krupt Mob Entertainment	
8	Preme	Penthouse	MNRK	
10	Teezo Touchdown	How Do You Sleep At Night? With You	Not Fit For Society, RCA Records	
12	21 Savage	American Dream	Slaughter Gang, Epic Records	Debuted at No. 1 on the Billboard 200
12	22Gz	Growth & Development II	Blixky Entertainment	
12	6ix9ine	Blackballed	Self-released	
12	Blueface	Free Blueface	100 Entertainment	
12	D-Block Europe	Rolling Stone	EGA Records	Debuted at No. 1 on the UK Albums Chart
12	Jeymes Samuel	The Book of Clarence (The Motion Picture Soundtrack)	Geneva Club, Roc Nation Records	
12	K Camp	Float 2 London	Rare Sound	
12	Kid Cudi	Insano	Wicked Awesome, Republic Records	Debuted at No. 13 on the Billboard 200
12	Nicholas Craven & Boldy James	Penalty of Leadership	Nicholas Craven Productions	
12	Unknown T	Blood Diamond	Island Records	Debuted at No. 61 on the UK Albums Chart
18	Ana Tijoux	Vida	Victoria Producciones	
18	Oddisee	Odd Sketches Vol. 1	Outer Note	
19	Eladio Carrión	Sol María	Rimas	Debuted at No. 37 on the Billboard 200
19	Ericdoa	DOA	Listen to the Kids, Interscope Records	
19	Fredo Bang	Yes, I'm Sad	Se Lavi Productions, Def Jam Recordings	
19	Lil Dicky	Penith	Commission Music	Debuted at No. 54 on the Billboard 200
21	Xaviersobased	Keep It Goin Xav	Self-released	
23	YN Jay & Louie Ray	The Scouts 2	YN Records	
25	Jacquees	Back to Me	Cash Money	
25	Kota the Friend	Lyrics to Go Vol. 5	FLTBYS	
26	Benny the Butcher	Everybody Can't Go	5 to 50, Def Jam Recordings	Debuted at No. 93 on the Billboard 200
26	Bones	Champion	Empire	
26	Don Trip	Frostbite	MRVL Music Group	
26	Kevin Gates	The Ceremony	Bread Winner Alumni, Atlantic Records	Debuted at No. 24 on the Billboard 200
26	Lyrical Lemonade	All Is Yellow	Lyrical Lemonade, Def Jam Recordings	Debuted at No. 43 on the Billboard 200
26	Masta Ace & Marco Polo	Richmond Hill	Fat Beats Records	
28	Adil Omar	Adil	Self-released	

=== February ===
Day	Artist(s)	Album	Record label(s)	Entering chart position
1	Cookin' Soul & Tha God Fahim	Supreme Dump Legend: Cook Soul Saga	Cookin Soul Records	
2	Icewear Vezzo	Live from the 6	Quality Control	
2	Lee "Scratch" Perry	King Perry	False Idols	
2	Ryan Leslie	You Know My Speed	Black Phoenix Enterprises	
2	$crim	Lonely Boy	G59 Records	Debuted at No. 134 on the Billboard 200
2	Soulja Boy	Swag 6	SODMG Records	
2	TiaCorine	Almost There	South Coast Music Group, Interscope Records	
4	Booba	Ad vitam æternam	Tallac	
8	Ovi	El Asere de Aseres	Warner Music Latina	
9	1999 Write the Future	Hella (˃̣̣̥╭╮˂̣̣̥) ✧ ♡ ‧º·˚	88rising	
9	Blu & Roy Royal	Royal Blu	New World Color	
9	Dizzee Rascal	Don't Take It Personal	Big Dirtee Records	Debuted at No. 27 on the UK Albums Chart
9	DJ Harrison	Shades of Yesterday	Stones Throw	
9	E.D.I. Mean & various artists	Street Fame (The Soundtrack)	O4L Digital	
9	Fivio Foreign	Pain & Love 2	RichFish, Columbia Records	
9	Little Simz	Drop 7	Forever Living Originals	
9	MadeinTYO	TYO 808	Madeinsounds	
9	Marnz Malone	Tina's Boy	Self-released	Debuted at No. 66 on the UK Albums Chart
10	¥$ (Kanye West & Ty Dolla $ign)	Vultures 1	Self-released	Debuted at No. 1 on the Billboard 200
14	Money Man	Purple Heart	Empire	
16	Booter Bee	True Stories	Zeromileage	Debuted at No. 34 on the UK Albums Chart
16	Dave East & Scram Jones	For the Love	FTD, Beats Music	
16	Heems & Lapgan	Lafandar	Veena Sounds, Mass Appeal India	
16	Icytwat	Magic As Usual	Siddhi	
16	Jon Connor	III	All Varsity Music	
16	Nafe Smallz	Ticket to the Moon	Self-released	
16	Quadeca	Scrapyard	DeadAir	
16	Rimzee	Feed the Streets	Believe UK	Debuted at No. 45 on the UK Albums Chart
16	Yeat	2093	Geffen, A Field Trip	Debuted at No. 2 on the Billboard 200
17	Bones	.ZIP	Empire	
22	Residente	Las Letras Ya No Importan	Sony Music Latin, 5020 Records	
23	Casey Veggies & Dylvinci	Nostalgia	PncIntl	
23	Chevy Woods	1998	Taylor Gang	
23	Don Trip	iHeartStrippersTrois	MRVL Music Group	
23	EarthGang	Robophobia	Dreamville, Sincethe80s	
23	Erick the Architect	I've Never Been Here Before	Architect Recording Company	
23	French Montana	Mac & Cheese 5	Coke Boys, Gamma.	Debuted at No. 14 on the Billboard 200
23	Ghetts	On Purpose, with Purpose	Warner Records, GIIG	Debuted at No. 29 on the UK Albums Chart
23	KA$HDAMI	Oasis	Mercury Records, Republic Records	
23	Kid Cudi	Insano (Nitro Mega)	Wicked Awesome, Republic Records	
23	LaRussell & Hit-Boy	Rent Due	Good Compenny	
23	Potter Payper	Thanks for Hating	Def Jam Recordings	Debuted at No. 5 on the UK Albums Chart
23	RJMrLA	The Bitch Tape	OMMIO, Empire	
23	SSGKobe	Horcrux	Self-released	
23	Stunna 4 Vegas	4Ever	S.T.B ENT	
23	Uncle Murda	Lenny Grant Story	ATM WorldWide, Empire	
24	BabyTron	Case Dismissed	The Hip Hop Lab, Empire	
29	Meek Mill	Heathenism	Dream Chasers Records	Debuted at No. 154 on the Billboard 200

=== March ===
Day	Artist(s)	Album	Record label(s)	Entering chart position
1	Glokk40Spaz	After TTBR	Columbia Records	
1	Iann Dior	Blind	10K Projects	
1	Jahari Massamba Unit (Karriem Riggins & Madlib)	YHWH Is Love	Law of Rhythm	
1	Robb Bank$	I Think I Might Be Happy, Pt. 1	430 Ent Deathless	
1	ScHoolboy Q	Blue Lips	Top Dawg Entertainment, Interscope Records	Debuted at No. 13 on the Billboard 200
1	Skrapz	Reflection	Atlantic Records UK	Debuted at No. 10 on the UK Albums Chart
1	That Mexican OT	Texas Technician	Good Money Global, Capitol Records	Debuted at No. 64 on the Billboard 200
6	Mike & Tony Seltzer	Pinball	10k	
7	Cookin' Soul & Raz Fresco	Bakin Soul	Cookin Soul Records, BKSCLB Records	
7	Tony Shhnow	Out The Woods	Self-released	
8	Bizzy Banks	Get Money Take Over Vol. 2	Atlantic Records	
8	CJ Fly	Baited	Self-released	
8	Kim Gordon	The Collective	Matador Records	
8	Kyle	Smyle Again	Independent Co	
8	LNDN DRGS	Affiliated 2	GDF Records	
8	Moor Mother	The Great Bailout	Anti-	
8	Never Broke Again	Compliments of Gravedigger Mountain	Never Broke Again, Motown Records	
8	Ransom & Harry Fraud	Lavish Misery	Momentum Entertainment, SRFSCHL	
8	Remy Banks	Champ Hoody Music. Ep. 3	Lisa Records	
13	Yung Lean & Bladee	Psykos	World Affairs	
14	Kenny Mason	9	RCA	
15	24kGoldn	Growing Pains	Columbia Records	
15	Bktherula	Lvl5 Pt2	Warner Records	
15	BossMan Dlow	Mr Beat the Road	Alamo Records, Sony Music Entertainment	Debuted at No. 20 on the Billboard 200
15	Chief Keef & Mike Will Made It	Dirty Nachos	43B, EarDrummer Records, RBC Records	
15	Chuck Strangers	A Forsaken Lover's Plea	Lex Records	
15	Cuzzos	Stay Safe	Myfault	
15	Flo Milli	Fine Ho, Stay	'94 Sounds, RCA	Debuted at No. 54 on the Billboard 200
15	Jay Critch	Humble Giant	Talk Money Entertainment, Empire	
15	Kembe X & Hippie Sabotage	Sleep Paralysis	BMR	
15	Locksmith	No Atheists in Foxholes	Landmark Entertainment	
15	Nemzzz	Do Not Disturb	Self-released	Debuted at No. 17 on the UK Albums Chart
15	Nikolija	Lavina	Made In BLKN	
15	RBX	Hibernation Shivers	Labcabin Records	
15	Speaker Knockerz	The Goat	Tailbandz Entertainment	
15	Tierra Whack	World Wide Whack	Interscope	
17	Lil' Flip & Rizzoo Rizzoo	The Leprechauns	Clover G, TSF	
18	E.D.I. Mean & Marsz	Amg Boyz Presents Greatness	Self-released	
21	Young Noble	The Last Outlaw	Outlaw Recordz	
22	Cakes da Killa	Black Sheep	Young Art	
22	Future & Metro Boomin	We Don't Trust You	Boominati Worldwide, Republic Records, Freebandz, Epic Records	Debuted at No. 1 on the Billboard 200
22	Joyner Lucas	Not Now, I'm Busy	Twenty Nine Music Group	Debuted at No. 42 on the Billboard 200
22	Loe Shimmy	Zombieland 2	Self-released	
22	Matt Champion	Mika's Laundry	RCA	
28	BlueBucksClan & Hit-Boy	Biggest Out The West	Surf Club, Out the Blue	
29	Bfb Da Packman	Forget Me Not	The Lunch Crew Company	
29	Blu & Shafiq Husayn	Out of the Blue	Nature Sounds	
29	Buddy	Don't Forget to Breathe	Empire	
29	DJ Muggs & Mooch	Roc Star	Soul Assassins	
29	Dom McLennon	The Changing of the Trees	Courtvision	
29	Don Trip	Before the Devil Knows You're Dead	MRVL Music Group	
29	FearDorian	FearDorian	Self-released	
29	J-Hope	Hope on the Street Vol. 1	Big Hit	Debuted at No. 5 on the Billboard 200
29	Lil Skies	Out Ur Body Music	All We Got	
29	Nickelus F	MMCHT	Trick Dice	
29	Roc Marciano	Marciology	Pimpire Records, Marci Enterprises	
29	RXKNephew	Mind Yo Fucking Business	CrackRock Records	
29	Shabazz Palaces	Exotic Birds of Prey	Sub Pop	
29	Trippie Redd & Machine Gun Kelly	Genre: Sadboy	EST 19XX, 10K Projects, Interscope Records	Debuted at No. 30 on the Billboard 200
29	Yungeen Ace	Forgotten Star	Self-released	
29	Z-Ro	The Ghetto Gospel	1 Deep Entertainment, Empire	

=== April ===
Day	Artist(s)	Album	Record label(s)	Entering chart position
1	Dizzy Wright	Harsh Reality	Self-released	
4	Cookin' Soul & The Musalini	Mackaroni	Cookin Soul Records	
4	Nino Paid	Can't Go Bacc	Signal/Columbia	
5	AK the Savior & sagun	U R Not Alone	Self-released	
5	Bryson Tiller	Bryson Tiller	RCA Records	Debuted at No. 12 on the Billboard 200
5	Concrete Boys	It's Us Vol. 1	Quality Control Music	Debuted at No. 87 on the Billboard 200
5	GloRilla	Ehhthang Ehhthang	CMG, Interscope Records	Debuted at No. 18 on the Billboard 200
5	J. Cole	Might Delete Later	Cole World, Interscope	Debuted at No. 2 on the Billboard 200
5	Lil Mabu	Young Genius	Young Genius Academy	
5	Marv Won	I'm Fine, Thanks For Asking.	Mello Music Group	
5	Pharrell Williams	Black Yacht Rock Vol. 1	Self-released	
5	Pigeons & Planes	See You Next Year 2	Big.Ass.Kids	
5	Ritchie	Triple Digits [112]	Self-released	
5	TisaKorean	Mumu 8818	JaZZZy, Nice Life Recording Company	
5	Young Miko	Att.	Wave Music Group	Debuted at No. 129 on the Billboard 200
11	Shallipopi	Shakespopi	Plutomania Records, Dvpper Music	
12	Apathy	Connecticut Casual: Chapter 2	Dirty Version	
12	Asher Roth & Heather Grey	Temporary Heaven	Retrohash	
12	Future & Metro Boomin	We Still Don't Trust You	Wilburn Holding Co., Boominati Worldwide, Republic, Epic	Debuted at No. 1 on the Billboard 200
12	Jean Deaux	Nowhere, Fast	Guin Records	
12	Planet Asia & Local Astronauts	No Retirement	Goldchain Music	
12	Summrs	B4DaRaven	Self-released	
16	Autumn!	Solitary 2	Self-released	
17	@onefive	Classy Crush	Avex Trax	
17	Berner	The Farmer's Market	Bern One Entertainment, Empire	
17	UnoTheActivist	Music B4 Music	Omega Music Group	
19	BbyMutha	Sleep Paralysis	True Panther	
19	Blue Lab Beats	Blue Eclipse	Blue Adventure, Decca Records France	
19	Cadence Weapon	Rollercoaster	MNRK Music Group	
19	Cavaviler	Different Type Time	Backwoodz Studioz	
19	Gangrene	Heads I Win, Tails You Lose	ALC Records	
19	Iamsu!	In Su! Time	Eyes On Me	
19	M24	Concrete Rose	Orfevre	
19	Mez	The Loading	Heirs Entertainment, Mass Appeal	
19	Mozzy	Children of the Slums	Collective Music Group, Interscope Records	Debuted at No. 199 on the Billboard 200
19	Rowdy Rebel & Fetty Luciano	Splash Brothers 2	Self-released	
19	YNW Melly	Young New Wave	YNW4L	
23	Bladee	Cold Visions	Trash Island	
26	Baby Gang	L'angelo del male	Warner Music Italy	
26	Bluez Brothaz (T-Pain & Young Cash)	The Bluez Brothaz	Nappy Boy Entertainment	
26	Brother Ali	Love & Service	Travelers Media	
26	Bun B	Yokozuna Trill	IITRILL, 2Tight Music Japan	
26	Dillom	Por cesárea	Bohemian Groove	
26	Don Trip	This Message Will Self Destruct	MRVL Music Group	
26	Mike Dean	424	Self-released	
26	PartyNextDoor	PartyNextDoor 4	OVO Sound	Debuted at No. 10 on the Billboard 200
26	Skilla Baby	The Coldest	We Eat The Most, Geffen Records	Debuted at No. 175 on the Billboard 200
26	Tana	Bana	Galactic Records, Republic Records, UMG Recordings	
26	Yung Bleu	Jeremy	Vandross, Empire	Debuted at No. 51 on the Billboard 200

=== May ===
Day	Artist(s)	Album	Record label(s)	Entering chart position
1	Eladio Carrión	Porque Puedo	Rimas	
3	4Batz	U Made Me a St4r	Gamma	Debuted at No. 30 on the Billboard 200
3	Black Noi$e & Valee	Partridge	Unlimited Wifi	
3	k-os	Atlantis+	Universal Music Canada	
3	Lil' Keke	Can't Rain Forever	Slfmade 713, SoSouth	
3	Saigon & Fredro	The Jordan Era	Payday Records	
3	Slum Village	F.U.N	Ne'Astra Music, Virgin Music Group	
3	Spice 1	Platinum O.G. 2	Elder Entertainment	
9	iLoveMakonnen	Not My Makonnen	Timeless Magic	
9	The Act	Omega Music Vol. 1	Omega Music Group	
10	BigXthaPlug, Ro$ama & Yung Hood	Meet the 6ixers	600 Ent., UnitedMasters	
10	Bugzy Malone	The Great British Dream	B.Somebody	Debuted at No. 13 on the UK Albums Chart
10	Chief Keef	Almighty So 2	43B	Debuted at No. 30 on the Billboard 200
10	Conway the Machine	Slant Face Killah	Drumwork Music Group, Empire Distribution	
10	Ghostface Killah	Set the Tone (Guns & Roses)	Mass Appeal Records	
10	Gunna	One of Wun	YSL	Debuted at No. 2 on the Billboard 200
10	Kaash Paige	Catch Me While I Care	Self-released	
10	Kalan.FrFr	Make the West Great Again	Roc Nation	
10	M Huncho & Potter Payper	36 Hours	36TL	Debuted at No. 28 on the UK Albums Chart
10	OnPointLikeOP & Rowdy Rebel	Temperature 1090	Empire	
11	Rio da Yung OG	Rio Circa 2020	#Boyz Entertainment	
13	Childish Gambino	Atavista	RCA Records	Debuted at No. 62 on the Billboard 200
17	A Boogie wit da Hoodie	Better Off Alone	Atlantic Records, Highbridge	Debuted at No. 18 on the Billboard 200
17	BIG30	Still King	NLess Entertainment, Connect Music	
17	Blu	Abc	New World Color	
17	Clavish	Chapter 16	Universal Music Group, Polydor Records	Debuted at No. 30 on the UK Albums Chart
17	Ian	Valedictorian	Dogdog Records	Debuted at No. 54 on the Billboard 200
17	Kamaiyah	Figuring Out My Emotions	Keep It Lit Records	
17	Mach-Hommy	#RichAxxHaitian	Self-released	
17	Rapsody	Please Don't Cry	Jamla Records, Roc Nation	
21	Juicy J	Mental Trillness 2	Trippy Music, Stem	
23	Trueno	El Último Baile	Sony US Latin, Sur Capital	
24	Coi Leray	Lemon Cars	Island Records, Universal Music Group	
24	Fenix Flexin	Back Flexin	Flexxd Up, Empire	
24	Meekz	Tru	Self-released	Debuted at No. 12 on the UK Albums Chart
24	Niko B	Dog Eat Dog Food World	Self-released	Debuted at No. 43 on the UK Albums Chart
24	Pak-Man	Legendary Still	Self-released	Debuted at No. 74 on the UK Albums Chart
24	Rah Swish	Elevator Music	Woo Entertainment, Empire	
24	RM	Right Place, Wrong Person	Big Hit	Debuted at No. 5 on the Billboard 200
24	Sango	North Vol. 2	Self-released	
24	Sexyy Red	In Sexyy We Trust	Open Shift Distribution, Gamma.	Debuted at No. 17 on the Billboard 200
24	Smoke DZA & DJ RellyRell	You're All Welcome	RFC Music Group	
24	Twenty One Pilots	Clancy	Fueled by Ramen, Elektra	Debuted at No. 3 on the Billboard 200
24	Vince Staples	Dark Times	Blacksmith Records, Def Jam Recordings	Debuted at No. 69 on the Billboard 200
30	Belly	96 Miles from Bethlehem	SALXCO, Universal Arabic Music	
30	Big Hit, Hit-Boy & The Alchemist	Black & Whites	Surf Club, Empire	
30	SCH	JVLIVS Prequel: Giulio	Maison Baron Rouge, Warner Music France	
31	Brotha Lynch Hung	Season of Da Siccness 2: Kevlar	Madesicc Muzicc, RBC Records, BMG Rights Management	
31	Dave East & Mike & Keys	Apt 6E	FTD	
31	Don Trip	Mayhem	MRVL Music Group	
31	Homixide Gang	I5U5WE5	Opium, Interscope Records	
31	K-Trap	Smile?	Thousand8.	Debuted at No. 10 on the UK Albums Chart
31	Miky Woodz	Built Different	Rimas Entertainment	
31	MO3	Legend	H$M Music, Empire	
31	Nasaan	Error 404	Assemble Sound, Atlantic Records	
31	RXKNephew	Till I'm Dead 2	Crack Rock Records, NEWWRLD Distribution	
31	Tha Dogg Pound	W.A.W.G. (We All We Got)	Death Row Records, Gamma	
31	Vulture Love	The Last Zombies On Earth	Vulture Love, Capitol Records, UMG Recordings	

=== June ===
Day	Artist(s)	Album	Record label(s)	Entering chart position
6	Oki	Era47	Self-released	
7	2hollis	Boy	Self-released	
7	Hunxho	Before The Album	300 Entertainment	Debuted at No. 197 on the Billboard 200
7	J. Stalin	Me Vs. Me 3	Livewire, Empire	
7	Joey Valence & Brae	No Hands	JVB Records	
7	NxWorries	Why Lawd?	Stones Throw Records	Debuted at No. 104 on the Billboard 200
7	Ski Mask the Slump God	11th Dimension	Victor Victor, Republic Records, UMG Recordings	Debuted at No. 55 on the Billboard 200
7	The Game & various artists	Time	STB Entertainment	
7	Yelawolf	War Story	Slumerican	
7	Slim Thug	Around the World	Hogg Life	
11	Cory Gunz	Loosie Pack 3	Militia Entertainment	
13	Robb Bank$	I Think I Might Be Happy, Pt. 2	430 Ent Deathless	
14	Bigidagoe	6 Gangen Menu	MPG Music	
14	Don Toliver	Hardstone Psycho	Cactus Jack, Atlantic	Debuted at No. 3 on the Billboard 200
14	Guilty Simpson & Kong The Artisan	Giants of the Fall	Noel & Poland Records	
14	Homeboy Sandman	Rich II	Dirty Looks	
14	JasonMartin & DJ Quik	Chupacabra	50Million, Mad Scientist, Empire	
14	Jev.	When Angels Cry	Loner	
14	Kneecap	Fine Art	Heavenly	Debuted at No. 2 on the IRMA Chart
14	Lucki	Gemini!	Empire Distribution	Debuted at No. 20 on the Billboard 200
14	Moneybagg Yo	Speak Now	Collective Music Group, Interscope Records	Debuted at No. 13 on the Billboard 200
14	RJD2	Visions Out of Limelight	RJ's Electrical Connections	
14	Skaiwater	#Gigi	GoodTalk, Capitol Records	
14	$uicideboy$	New World Depression	G*59 Records	Debuted at No. 5 on the Billboard 200
14	Yvngxchris	Everyone Hates Chris! II	YvngXWorld	
17	Krayzie Bone	Chasing The Devil: Chapter 2 'Salvation'	The Life Apparel	
20	Peso Pluma	Éxodo	Double P Records	Debuted at No. 5 on the Billboard 200
21	22Gz	Brooklyn's Most Wanted	Blixky Ent.	
21	Berner & Drodi	100 Sources of Income	Bern One Entertainment	
21	Capella Grey	Vibe Responsibly, Vol. 1	Allepac The Family, 10K Projects	
21	CJ Fly & NasteeLuvzYou	The Pharaoh's Return 2: Nubia	SWARM, AfterLyfe Records	
21	Da Beatminerz	Stifled Creativity	Soulspazm Records, SCHMTCS	
21	Esham	Amuse Bouche	Reel Life Productions	
21	G-Eazy	Freak Show	RCA Records	
21	Nyck Caution	Yellow Tape Road	Epidemic Sound	
21	Polo Perks <3 <3 <3, FearDorian & AyooLii	A Dog's Chance	3500	
21	Samuel Shabazz	Planeboy	Hangar 27, Empire	
21	Vinnie Paz	Jacinto's Praying Mantis	Iron Tusk Music	
21	Your Old Droog	Movie	Self-released	
28	Boldy James & Conductor Williams	Across the Tracks	Near Mint	
28	Channel Tres	Head Rush	RCA Records	
28	Dave Blunts	Well Dude Here's My Thing	Listen to the Kids	
28	DC the Don	2012	Rostrum Records	
28	Don Trip & Pif	In Loving Memory	MRVL Music Group	
28	Headie One	The Last One	Sony Music UK	Debuted at No. 52 on the UK Albums Chart
28	James Blake & Lil Yachty	Bad Cameo	Quality Control Music, Motown, Polydor Records, Republic Records	
28	Kxng Crooked & Joell Ortiz	Tapestry	Hitmaker Music Group	
28	Lil Gotit	Shut The Door, Nobody Listening	Self-released	
28	Lupe Fiasco	Samurai	1st & 15th Too, Thirty Tigers	
28	Maundz	Youth Is Wasted On The Young	Golden Era Records	Debuted at No. 47 on the ARIA Charts
28	Megan Thee Stallion	Megan	Hot Girl Productions, Warner, BMG	Debuted at No. 3 on the Billboard 200
28	Previous Industries (Open Mike Eagle, Still Rift & Video Dave)	Service Merchandise	Merge Records	
28	Price & Kota the Friend	Sanctioned Vol. 1	CLRD ENT, Rostrum Records	
28	Sauce Walka	Saucefather 2	The Sauce Familia, Empire	
28	Stefflon Don	Island 54	4 London, BMG	

=== July ===
Day	Artist(s)	Album	Record label(s)	Entering chart position
4	42 Dugg	4eva Us Neva Them	4 Pockets Full, Collective Music Group, Interscope Records	Debuted at No. 76 on the Billboard 200
4	Cappadonna	Fire & Brimstone	RBC Records	
5	Chip & Nafe Smallz	Neighbourhood	CMZ	
5	Stalley	Peerless	Blue Collar Gang	
5	YTB Fatt	On Zai	Loaf Boyz Ventures, 10K Projects	Debuted at No. 133 on the Billboard 200
6	Cory Gunz	The Militia	Self-released	
7	LaRussell & P-Lo	Majorly Independent	Good Compenny	
10	AntsLive	Real Life	Payday Records	
10	BabyTron & Certified Trapper	Mario & Luigi	The Hip Hop Lab, Empire Distribution	
11	Action Bronson	Johann Sebastian Bachlava the Doctor	Self-released	
11	Bashy	Being Poor is Expensive	Bish Bash Bosh Music	
11	Juicy J & Xavier Wulf	Memphis Zoo	Self-released	
12	Autumn!	You Never Was Mine	Self-released	
12	Berwyn	Who Am I	Sony Music UK	
12	BLP Kosher	Scarecrow	Dreidel Gang, Encore Recordings	
12	Blu & Evidence	Los Angeles	New World Color, Bigger Picture Recordings	
12	Common & Pete Rock	The Auditorium Vol. 1	Loma Vista Recordings	
12	Eminem	The Death of Slim Shady (Coup de Grâce)	Shady, Aftermath, Interscope	Debuted at No. 1 on the Billboard 200
12	Jay Worthy & DāM-FunK	Magic Hour	GDF Records, Empire	
12	Nacho Picasso & Televangel	Jesse's Revenge	Self-released	
12	$NOT	Viceroy	300 Entertainment	
12	Tech N9ne Collabos	Cosm	Strange Music, Strange Main, Compound Interest, Virgin Music Group	
12	Zacari	Bliss	Top Dawg Entertainment	
19	Blxst	I'll Always Come Find You	Evgle, Red Bull Records	
19	Childish Gambino	Bando Stone & the New World	RCA Records	Debuted at No. 16 on the Billboard 200
19	Curren$y & MonstaBeatz	Radioactive	Jet Life Recordings	
19	Denzel Curry	King of the Mischievous South Vol. 2	Ultraground, Loma Vista Recordings	Debuted at No. 81 on the Billboard 200
19	Freeway & Jake One	The Stimulus Package 2	White Van Music, Freedom Thinkers Academy, Venice Music	
19	Jace!	Reverence 2	Simple Stupid, Capitol Records	
19	JT	City Cinderella	Quality Control Music, Motown	Debuted at No. 27 on the Billboard 200
19	Midwxst	Back In Action 4.0	Self-released	
19	Rich the Kid	Life's a Gamble	RTK, Gamma.	
19	Russ Millions	Shylo	Since 93	
19	Snakehips & EarthGang	SnakeGang, Vol. 1	Never Worry Records	
19	Starlito	Imposter Syndrome	Grind Hard	
24	RXKNephew	Slitherman For President	CrackRock Records	
25	Brooke Candy	Candyland	Self-released	
26	Cousin Stizz	GABOS (Game Ain't Based on Sympathy)	Self-released	
26	Don Trip	Freedom Fighter	MRVL Music Group	
26	Forrest Frank	Child of God	River House Records, 10K Projects	Debuted at No. 28 on the Billboard 200
26	Grafh & 38 Spesh	God's Timing	TCF	
26	Ice Spice	Y2K!	10K Projects, Capitol Records	Debuted at No. 18 on the Billboard 200
26	K Suave	It Was Never Serious	1400/800, Slayer Academy	
26	Mustard	Faith of a Mustard Seed	10 Summers, BMG	Debuted at No. 50 on the Billboard 200
26	Quin NFN	Second to None	NFN Entertainment, Empire	
26	Rakim	G.O.Ds Network (Reb7rth)	RRC Music	
26	Raz Fresco & DJ Muggs	The Eternal Now	Soul Assassins Records	
28	Soulja Boy	Swag Season	SODMG	
29	Wiz Khalifa	Wiz Owens	Taylor Gang	
30	RXKNephew	Always Remember Me	CrackRock Records	

=== August ===
Day	Artist(s)	Album	Record label(s)	Entering chart position
1	JPEGMAFIA	I Lay Down My Life for You	AWAL	Debuted at No. 102 on the Billboard 200
2	AraabMuzik	Aggro Dr1ft (Original Motion Picture Soundtrack)	Milan Records	
2	Emilio Rojas	It Always Gets Better	Breaking Point	
2	Killer Mike	Songs for Sinners & Saints	Loma Vista Recordings	
2	Navy Blue	Memoirs in Armour	Freedom Sounds	
2	Philthy Rich	My Block: Welcome to Sem City 3	FOD	
2	Remtrex	Conspiracy	Self-released	
2	Q Da Fool	King George	Rich Shootas	
2	Yung Gravy	Serving Country	Republic Records	
3	¥$	Vultures 2	Self-released	Debuted at No. 2 on the Billboard 200
6	J.U.S & Squadda B	3rd Shift	Bruiser Brigade Records	
6	Phonte	Pacific Time 2	The Foreign Exchange Music	
8	August 08	Pretend It's Okay	Def Jam, UMG	
8	Southside	Break The Silence	Southside Productions, Epic	
9	3%	Kill the Dead	1788 Records, Virgin	Debuted at No. 12 on the ARIA Charts
9	Ameer Vann	Woof	Self-released	
9	Asake	Lungu Boy	YBNL Nation, Empire	Debuted at No. 115 on the Billboard 200
9	Benny the Butcher & Black Soprano Family	Summertime Butch	Black Soprano Family	
9	J Balvin	Rayo	Capitol Records	
9	Larry June	Doing It for Me	The Freeminded Records, Empire	Debuted at No. 81 on the Billboard 200
9	Latto	Sugar Honey Iced Tea	Streamcut, RCA Records	Debuted at No. 15 on the Billboard 200
9	Lil Mosey	Love U Forever	Love U Forever, Cinq Music Group	
9	Logic	Ultra 85	BobbyBoy Records, BMG Records	Debuted at No. 45 on the Billboard 200
9	Mavi	Shadowbox	Self-released	
9	Polo G	Hood Poet	Columbia Records	Debuted at No. 28 on the Billboard 200
10	Drake	100 Gigs	OVO Sound, Republic Records	
13	YK Osiris	Dear Fans	Drummer Records	
16	38 Spesh	Mother & Gun	TCF	
16	B.o.B	Space Time	Bobby Ray Music, CWE	
16	Diamond D	The Diam Piece 3: Initium	Dymond Mine Records	
16	Gucci Mane & DJ Drama	Greatest Of All Trappers: Gangsta Grillz Edition	1017, Atlantic	
16	Matt Ox	I Don't Wanna Grow Up	Self-released	
16	NoCap	Before I Disappear Again	Atlantic	Debuted at No. 18 on the Billboard 200
16	Pouya	They Could Never Make Me Hate You	Empire	
16	Quando Rondo	Here For a Reason: In the Darkest Time	Never Broke Again, Atlantic	
16	Valee	V-Sides	LTD	
16	YG	Just Re'd Up 3	4Hunnid Records, BMG	Debuted at No. 151 on the Billboard 200
19	Ka	The Thief Next to Jesus	Self-released	
21	Sha EK	Drill Is Dead	Defiant Records	
22	EBK Jaaybo	The Reaper	Encore Recordings	
22	Jay1	Sorry I'm Late	One Wave	
22	Myke Towers	La Pantera Negra	One World International, Warner	Debuted at No. 82 on the Billboard 200
23	Cash Cobain	Play Cash Cobain	Giant Music	Debuted at No. 113 on the Billboard 200
23	Chef G Cole & RJMrLA	The Recipe	Admiral Music Group, OMMIO	
23	Heems	Veena	Veena, Mass Appeal	
23	Luh Tyler	Mr. Skii	Motion Music, Atlantic Records	Debuted at No. 197 on the Billboard 200
23	OG Parker	Moments	Empire Distribution	
23	Planet Asia & 38 Spesh	Trust The Chain II	Trust Music Group	
23	PlayThatBoiZay	VIP	Loma Vista	
23	Ralo	Welcome Home	300 Entertainment	
23	Trae tha Truth	Crowd Control	Self-released	
23	X-Raided	A Sin In Heaven	Strange Music	
23	Young T & Bugsey	Beyond Rea5onable Doubt	AWAL	
27	Juicy J	Ravenite Social Club	Trippy Music	
28	Fireboy DML	Adedamola	YBNL Nation	
29	Lenny Tavárez	Brillar	Kristoman, Warner	
30	AP Dhillon	The Brownprint	Republic Records	
30	Big Sean	Better Me Than You	FF to Def Entertainment, Def Jam Recordings	Debuted at No. 25 on the Billboard 200
30	Coco & Clair Clair	Girl	Nice Girl World	
30	Curren$y & DJ Fresh	The Tonite Show The Sequel	Jet Life Recordings, Empire, Fresh In The Flesh	
30	Destroy Lonely	Love Lasts Forever	Opium	Debuted at No. 10 on the Billboard 200
30	Doechii	Alligator Bites Never Heal	Top Dawg, Capitol Records	Debuted at No. 117 on the Billboard 200
30	Don Trip	Que Sera Sera	MRVL Music Group	
30	Erica Banks	Cocky on Purpose 2	1501 Certified, Create Music Group	
30	Fat Trel	Boosa's Keeper	Self-released	
30	Glokk40Spaz	Da Real Oso	Columbia Records	
30	K.A.A.N. & DJ Hoppa	In Due Time	Broken Complex	
30	Mozzy	Brash Dummies	Mozzy Records	
30	Quelle Chris, Cavalier & Denmark Vessey	Death Tape 2 | We 'Gon Need Each Other	Self-released	
30	RZA, Colorado Symphony & Christopher Dragon	A Ballet Through Mud	Warner Records	
30	Smoke DZA	THC3 (Kushedgod Bitch)	Smoker's Club Records	
30	Strick	All Time High	YSL Records, 300	
30	Tobe Nwigwe	Hood Hymns	The Good Stewards	
31	Cities Aviv	Archive & Practice 001	Total Works	

=== September ===
Day	Artist(s)	Album	Record label(s)	Entering chart position
6	Chow Lee	Sex Drive	Empire	
6	G Herbo	Big Swerv	Republic Records	Debuted at No. 126 on the Billboard 200
6	Laila!	Gap Year!	IIIXL Studio	
6	LL Cool J	The FORCE	Def Jam, S-BRO	Debuted at No. 50 on the Billboard 200
6	Ransom, Conway the Machine & V Don	Chaos Is My Ladder 2	Momentum, Drumwork Music Group, Serious Soundz	
6	ShittyBoyz	3 Man Weave	The Hip Hop Lab	
6	SleazyWorld Go	More Than A Shooter	Island Records	
6	Toro y Moi	Hole Erth	Dead Oceans	
12	Bizzy Bone	Bizzy Bone	JAM tv	
13	Babyface Ray	The Kid That Did	Wavy Gang, Empire	Debuted at No. 71 on the Billboard 200
13	Jay Worthy & MadeinTYO	Time After Time	Madeinsounds, GDF Records, Creator-Sync	
13	Joba	Russell Boring	Worldsmile	
13	Ka$hdami	Infiniti	Ka$hWayz	
13	SosMula	Sleez Religion	Republic Records	
13	Talib Kweli & J. Rawls	The Confidence of Knowing	Javotti Media, Fat Beats	
17	Jake One	12/96	Snare Jordan	
18	Killah Priest	Abraxas Rebis Simha Pleroma	Proverbs Records	
20	Blu & Exile	Love (the) Ominous World	New World Color, Dirty Science	
20	Eric Reprid	Fuck You	Independent	
20	Future	Mixtape Pluto	Freebandz, Epic Records	Debuted at No. 1 on the Billboard 200
20	Houdini	Hou I'm Meant to Be	Create Music Group	
20	Lil Peep	Lil Peep; Part One	AWAL	
20	Lil Tecca	Plan A	Galactic Records, Republic Records	Debuted at No. 9 on the Billboard 200
20	Lil Xan	Diego	Xanarchy, Columbia Records	
20	MC Lyte	1 of 1	My Block, Sunni Gyrl	
20	OMB Peezy & Will A Fool	Still Too Deep	Overkill, 300	
20	The Alchemist	The Genuine Articulate	ALC Records	
20	TyFontaine	Ascension2: act II	MNRK	
23	Foolio	Demi God	Create Music Group	
24	Cardo Got Wings	Mademan	Madhouse, Empire	
26	Peezy	Small Town Ghetto	#Boyz, Empire	
27	Consequence	Nice Doing Business With You	192 Records, Hitmaker	
27	DaBaby	How Tf Is This a Mixtape?	South Coast, Interscope	Debuted at No. 154 on the Billboard 200
27	Don Trip	Revenge of the Fallen	MRVL Music Group	
27	Doodie Lo	What Made Me	Empire	
27	Fashawn & ProducerTrentTaylor	You Owe Us With Interest	Mid90s	
27	Kamaiyah	Before We Party	99 Ovr, Hitmaker, Keep It Lit	
27	Leon Thomas	Mutt	EZMNY, Motown	Debuted at No. 161 on the Billboard 200
27	Monaleo	Throwing Bows	Stomp Down	
27	Mustafa	Dunya	Jagjaguwar	
27	Nines	Quit While You're Ahead	Zino Records	Debuted at No. 4 on the UK Albums Chart
27	NLE Choppa	Slut SZN	Warner	Debuted at No. 199 on the Billboard 200
27	Tommy Richman	Coyote	Pulse Records, ISO Supremacy	

=== October ===
Day	Artist(s)	Album	Record label(s)	Entering chart position
2	454	Casts of a Dreamer	4Ever	
3	BabyChiefDoit	Animals Only	Artist Partner Group	
4	310babii	310degrees	Empire	
4	Jabee	The Spirit is Willing, but the Flesh is Weak	Mello Music Group	
4	Joey Cool	Roller Coaster	Strange Music, Strange Main, Compound Interest, Virgin Music Group	
4	Jordan Ward & Joony	Jrny	Artium, Interscope	
4	Loe Shimmy	The Z Files	Open Shift	
4	M1llionz	Ghetto Life	Ten Percent Music	
4	OneDa	Formula OneDa	Heavenly Recordings	
4	Powers Pleasant	Life Sucks	Angel Grove, Mass Appeal	
4	Quin NFN	Rebirth	Empire, NFN Entertainment	
4	Rich Homie Quan	Forever Goin In	Rich Homie Entertainment	
4	Rome Streetz & Daringer	Hatton Garden Holdup	The Influenyce Enterprise	
4	Tay B	You're Welcome	Giant Music, AFLN Music Group	
4	Tee Grizzley	Post Traumatic	300 Entertainment, Grizzley Gang	Debuted at No. 60 on the Billboard 200
4	Toosii	Jaded	South Coast Music, Capitol Records	Debuted at No. 50 on the Billboard 200
10	Bizarre & Foul Mouth	HGG4	Red Head Records	
11	BigXthaPlug	Take Care	UnitedMasters	Debuted at No. 8 on the Billboard 200
11	Curren$y & DJ Fresh	The Encore	Jet Life Recordings, Empire, Fresh In The Flesh	
11	DeJ Loaf	End of Summer	Fomily Foundation, Sounds Like Home	
11	Dom Kennedy	Class of 95	The Other People's Money Company	
11	Elucid	Revelator	Fat Possum	
11	Gashi	Brooklyn Cowboy	Orca Sound Records	
11	GloRilla	Glorious	Interscope, Collective Music Group	Debuted at No. 5 on the Billboard 200
11	Joell Ortiz & The Heatmakerz	W.A.R. (With All Respect)	Hitmaker Music Group	
11	Ovrkast	Kast Got Wings	IIIXL Studio	
11	Pharrell Williams	Piece by Piece (Original Motion Picture Soundtrack)	Columbia, Focus Features	
11	Rich the Kid, Famous Dex & Jay Critch	Rich Forever 5	Rich Forever Music, Create Music Group	
11	Rod Wave	Last Lap	Alamo Records	Debuted at No. 2 on the Billboard 200
11	Sneakbo	4Better 4Worse 4Life	Self-released	
11	Trauma Tone, Money Man & Zaytoven	TMZ	Black Circle, Empire	
11	Willie the Kid & V Don	Deutsche Marks 4	The Fly, Serious Soundz	
16	Baby Kia	I Pray You Die	Artist Partner Group	
16	DD Osama	Before the Album	Alamo	
16	Hemlock Ernst	Studying Absence	Icky Reels, Tygr Rawwk	
17	03 Greedo & Helluva	Hella Greedy	Alamo Records	
18	Benny the Butcher & 38 Spesh	Stabbed & Shot 2	T.C.F. Music Group, Black Soprano Family	
18	Big Boogie	Ether	Collective Music Group	
18	Dave Blunts	If I Could I Would	Listen to the Kids	
18	DJ Muggs, Crimeapple & RLX	Los Pollos Hermanos	Soul Assassins Records	
18	ian	Goodbye Horses	Bu Vision, Columbia	Debuted at No. 86 on the Billboard 200
18	J. Stalin	Scarface	Livewire, Empire	
18	Jean Dawson	Glimmer of God	P+	
18	J.P.	School Dance	Roc Nation	
18	Kurious	Majician	Metalface, Rhymesayers	
18	Philthy Rich & Motion Mall	My Block: Welcome to Sem City 4	FOD	
18	TisaKorean	In Silly We Trust	JaZZZy, Nice Life Recording Company	
18	Yeat	Lyfestyle	Capitol Records, Field Trip	Debuted at No. 1 on the Billboard 200
19	Homeboy Sandman	Nor Can These Be Sold (At Least By Me)	Self-released	
23	DC the Don	Rebirth	Letter 5, Rostrum Records	
23	Nappy Nina & Swarvy	Nothing Is My Favorite Thing	Stimulated, LucidHaus	
25	Cochise	Why Always Me?	Columbia Records	
25	Don Trip	Your's Truly	MRVL Music Group	
25	Fat Nick	Tainted Angels	Rostrum	
25	G Herbo	Big Swerv 2.0	Republic Records	
25	Hunxho	Thank God	300 Entertainment	Debuted at No. 87 on the Billboard 200
25	Megan Thee Stallion	Megan: Act II	Hot Girl Productions	
25	Payroll Giovanni	Hustle Muzik	Bylug, Empire	
25	Rejjie Snow	Peace 2 da World	Honeymoon, +1 Records	
25	Sheek Louch	Gorillaween V.6	D Block Records	
25	Tha Eastsidaz	Still Easty	Death Row, Gamma	
25	Thouxanbanfauni	Live Wire	Create Music Group	
25	Young Roddy, Jamaal, Kingikeem & Jameel Na'im X	The Company You Keep	Self-released	
25	Young Slo-Be	Slo-Be Bryant 4	KoldGreedy, Thizzler on the Roof	
28	Tyler, the Creator	Chromakopia	Columbia Records	Debuted at No. 1 on the Billboard 200
28	Lowkey	Soundtrack to the Struggle 3	Self-released	
29	Baby Tate	Tate Tuesday, Vol. 1	Sekoya Spectrum	
29	D2x	The Hunger Era	Self-released	
29	EarthGang	Perfect Fantasy	SinceThe80s, Dreamville	
29	VonOff1700	#TurntUpNotBurntUp	Signal, Columbia	
30	Icewear Vezzo	Live From The 6 (Part Two)	Iced Up Records	
31	Conductor Williams	Conductor We Have a Problem, Pt. 3	Self-released	
31	Lloyd Banks	Halloween Havoc V	Money by Any Means	
31	Thurz	Yannick Koffi: In Time	PIMLR Originals	
31	Westside Gunn	11	Griselda Records	

=== November ===
Day	Artist(s)	Album	Record label(s)	Entering chart position
1	DaeMoney	The Godson	Empire	
1	Freddie Gibbs	You Only Die 1nce	AWAL Recordings	Debuted at No. 105 on the Billboard 200
1	IDK	Bravado + Intimo	Clue No Clue	
1	Jay Worthy & DJ Fresh	The Tonite Show Part 2	Fresh in the Flesh, GDF, Empire	
1	Kodak Black	Dieuson Octave	Vulture Love, Capitol	
1	Lil Uzi Vert	Eternal Atake 2	Roc Nation, Atlantic, Generation Now	Debuted at No. 3 on the Billboard 200
1	Lil Zay Osama	Streets Calling My Name 2	Warner	
1	Westside Gunn & DJ Drama	Still Praying	Griselda	
4	03 Greedo	Crip, I'm Sexy	Self-released	
6	Chino XL and Bodybag Ben	Darkness and Other Colors	Ruling Panel, LLC, Holy Toledo Productions	
8	Ab-Soul	Soul Burger	Top Dawg Entertainment	
8	A$AP Ferg	Darold	RCA Records, Sony Music	
8	BabyTron	Tronicles	Empire, The Hip Hop Lab	
8	Bali Baby	Mother	Create Music Group	
8	Fimiguerrero, Len & Lancey Foux	Conglomerate	Lizzy	
8	Glokk40Spaz	Slaughter House Recordz	Columbia Records	
8	Hitkidd	Hitkidd For President	Campsouth, AWAL	
8	JasonMartin & Mike & Keys	5 Pack	50 Million	
8	Kyle & Steven Shaefferr	Lvl 1: At Least It Was Fun	Independent Co	
8	Loe Shimmy	Nardy World	Open Shift	
8	Premo Rice & Harry Fraud	P Got Game	Live Forever Recordings, SRFSCHL	
8	Raz Fresco & Dibia$e	Knockout	Self-released	
8	Real Boston Richey	Richey Rich	Freebandz, Epic	Debuted at No. 48 on the Billboard 200
8	SahBabii	Saaheem	StreamCut	Debuted at No. 123 on the Billboard 200
8	Shordie Shordie	Breath Of Fresh Air	Sucker Free, Empire	
8	Talibando	Art Of War	Empire	
8	Yatta Bandz	Acrylic	Empire	
11	Berner	Hoffa	Bern One Entertainment	
13	Young Nudy & Pi'erre Bourne	Sli'merre 2	RCA Records	
14	Desiigner	Rebirth	L.O.D.	
15	070 Shake	Petrichor	GOOD Music, Def Jam	
15	BlakeIana	Back In The Field	300 Entertainment, Murda Recordings	
15	Blanco	Gilberto's Son	Believe Distribution	
15	Cordae	The Crossroads	Atlantic	Debuted at No. 143 on the Billboard 200
15	Dave East & AraabMuzik	Living Proof	Def Jam, Genre Defying	
15	Illy	Good Life	Warner Music Australia	Debuted at No. 4 on the ARIA Charts
15	Kwengface	A Gangster's Holiday	Empire	
15	Mary J. Blige	Gratitude	300, Mary Jane	
15	Maxo Kream	Personification	Persona Money Gang, Stomp Down	
15	Pa Salieu	Afrikan Alien	Warner	
15	Quando Rondo	Here For A Reason	Never Broke Again, Atlantic	
18	Jeleel	Xistence.	Real Raw!	
19	YTB Fatt	The Richest Foxx	Loaf Boyz Ventures, 10K Projects	
20	Kenny Mason	Angel Eyes	RCA Records	
20	Marlon Craft	The Long Game: A Collection of Songs By Marlon Craft	Homecourt	
21	Freddie Dredd	Cease & Disintegrate	RCA	
22	Ant	Collection of Sounds: Volume 2	Rhymesayers	
22	Babyfxce E	Real Striker Music	Atlantic Records	
22	Bfb Da Packman	4th Quarter Shit Talking	The Lunch Crew Company, Synrgy	
22	Blockhead	Mortality Is Lit!	Future Archive Recordings	
22	Body Count	Merciless	Century Media	
22	Boldy James & Harry Fraud	The Bricktionary	SRFSCHL	
22	Chicken P	Chick James Vol. 1	Really Rich Empire, 10K Projects	
22	Dizzy Wright, Demrick & Mike & Keys	Blaze With Us 3	Empire	
22	Don Trip	Behind Enemy Lines	MRVL Music Group	
22	Duke Deuce & Made Men Mafia	Tribe	Hitmaker Music Group, Made Men Movement	
22	Finesse2tymes	Art of War	Mob Ties, Bread Gang, Atlantic Records	
22	G Perico	Crip James	Perico's Innerprize, Empire	
22	Ice Cube	Man Down	Lench Mob Records, Hitmaker Distribution	Debuted at No. 48 on the Billboard 200
22	Jace!	Curation 4	Simple Stupid, UMG	
22	Kendrick Lamar	GNX	PGLang, Interscope	Debuted at No. 1 on the Billboard 200
22	Rucci	Can't Stop Won't Stop 2	Mackk & Company, Empire	
22	Sheff G	Proud Of Myself	Winners Circle, RCA Records	
22	Skilla Baby	Crack Music 3	Geffen Records	
29	Juice WRLD	The Party Never Ends	Grade A, Interscope Records	Debuted at No. 4 on the Billboard 200
29	Kodak Black	Trill Bill	Vulture Love, Capitol	
29	Potter Payper	Nightmare Before Christmas	Self-released	Debuted at No. 30 on the UK Albums Chart
29	Skyzoo	Keep Me Company	Old Soul Music, First Generation Rich	
29	Yung Kayo	Holy Grails	Self-released	
29	Yungeen Ace	I Control My Destiny	Self-released	

=== December ===
Day	Artist(s)	Album	Record label(s)	Entering chart position
1	Drakeo the Ruler	The Undisputed Truth	Stinc Team	
4	Soulja Boy	Diary of a Soldier	SODMG Records	
6	Apollo Brown & Crimeapple	This, Is Not That	Mello Music Group	
6	B-Real & Psycho Les	Real Psycho	Self-released	
6	Bun B & Statik Selektah	TrillStatik 4	ShowOff Records	
6	Casanova	I Get It Now	2X, Empire	
6	Huey Briss	Better in Person	Briss Don't Miss, Create Music Group	
6	Lil Tjay	Farewell	Columbia Records	
6	Maino	MainoVation	Self-released	
6	Nettspend	Bad Ass F*cking Kid	Grade A Productions, Interscope Records	Debuted at No. 197 on the Billboard 200
6	Rich Amiri	War Ready	Internet Money Records, 10K Projects	
6	Roy Woods	Rolling Stone	OVO, Santa Anna	
6	Siete7x	Stucc in the Hole	Empire	
6	Smino	Maybe in Nirvana	Zero Fatigue	
6	Stress Eater (Czarface & Kool Keith)	Everybody Eats!	Silver Age	
6	Termanology & Tek	Teknology	St. Records, Perfect Time	
6	Tracy T & Honorable C.N.O.T.E.	I Ain't Forgot	Money Bound, Hustle Kids	
6	YoungBoy Never Broke Again	I Just Got a Lot on My Shoulders	Never Broke Again, Motown	Debuted at No. 159 on the Billboard 200
7	Asian Doll	Da Hardest Doll	Doll Gang	
9	Roc Marciano & The Alchemist	The Skeleton Key	Pimpire Records, ALC Records	
11	Yhapojj	No Ceilings	Underground Exclusives	
13	600 Breezy & DJ Holiday	Breezo George Gervin Iceman Edition 3	600Cartel, Empire	
13	9th Wonder	Zion X	Jamla	
13	BossMan Dlow	Dlow Curry	Alamo Records, Sony Music Entertainment	Debuted at No. 36 on the Billboard 200
13	Connie Diiamond	Underdog Szn: BRB	Def Jam	
13	DMX	Let Us Pray: Chapter X	Def Jam	
13	Fashawn & Little Vic	Carte Blanche	Orena	
13	Fat Joe	The World Changed On Me	RNG, Empire Distribution	
13	Kota the Friend & Statik Selektah	Once in a Blue Moon	Fltbys	
13	Mario	Glad You Came	New Citizen, Epic Records	
13	Paul Wall	Once Upon a Grind	Self-released	
13	PlayThatBoiZay	Vampires Impersonating People	Loma Vista	
13	RJMrLA	Cuffing Season	Ommio, Empire	
13	Sleepy Hallow	Read This When You Wake Up	Winners Circle Entertainment, RCA Records	
13	Snoop Dogg	Missionary	Death Row Records, Interscope Records, Aftermath Entertainment	Debuted at No. 20 on the Billboard 200
13	Tay Money	Like a Boss	Self-released	
13	Valee & Surf Gang	Grey Sky London	Surf Gang, Decent Distribution	
13	Z-Ro	Call Me Rother	Wreckshop, One Deep	
14	Dash	Quiet Storm	Hz Global	
15	Yasiin Bey	Money Christmas	Self-released	
16	Anti World Gangstars	Nothing Changed	Native Records	
18	Lazer Dim 700	Keepin It Cloudy	Self-released	
19	Arcángel	Papi Arca	Rimas	
19	KayCyy	Plum4n	Self-released	
20	Boldy James & WhoTheHellIsCarlo	Hidden in Plain Sight	Westside Bike Club	
20	Casey Veggies	Caught Up in the Game	Pncintl	
20	G Herbo	Greatest Rapper Alive	Self-released	
20	Mozzy & Kalan.FrFr	Lucky Her	Empire	
20	Peysoh	Peysoh Did It	Empire	
20	Protect	Ball Hog For Life	Self-released	
20	R.A.P. Ferreira	Outstanding Understanding	Self-released	
20	SZA	Lana	Top Dawg Entertainment, RCA Records	
20	Tink	Lost Pages	Winter's Diary	
20	YN Jay	DoonieVerse	YN Records	
21	03 Greedo	Album Inna Day	Self-released	
23	Famous Dex	For Ya'll	Self-released	
24	Myke Towers	Lyke Miike	One World International, Warner	
24	NLE Choppa	Picasso: Sluffin SZN X Slut SZN	NLE Choppa Entertainment, Warner Records	Debuted at No. 150 on the Billboard 200
24	Redman	Muddy Waters Too	Gilla House, Riveting Music	
25	Chris Webby	Last Wednesday	EightyHD	
25	Kodak Black	Gift for the Streets	Vulture Love, Capitol	
27	Don Trip	Christopher Season 4	MRVL Music Group	
27	Kamaiyah	Alternative Space	Self-released	
28	03 Greedo	All I Ever Wanted Was a Bankroll	Self-released	
30	Elucid	Interference Pattern	Self-released	
30	Iamsu!	Unconditional Pure Love	Eyes on Me	
31	OG Maco & Kino Beats	Legends Live Forever 2	Kino World Music	

== Highest-charting songs ==
=== United States ===
Hip hop songs from any year which charted in the 2024 Top 40 of the Billboard Hot 100
Song	Artist	Project	Peak position
"Carnival"	Kanye West and Ty Dolla Sign as ¥$ featuring Rich the Kid and Playboi Carti	Vultures 1	1
"Hiss"	Megan Thee Stallion	Megan	1
"Not Like Us"	Kendrick Lamar	—N/a	1
"Squabble Up"	Kendrick Lamar	GNX	1
"Like That"	Future, Metro Boomin and Kendrick Lamar	We Don't Trust You	1
"Type Shit"	Future, Metro Boomin, Travis Scott and Playboi Carti	We Don't Trust You	2
"Houdini"	Eminem	The Death of Slim Shady (Coup de Grâce)	2
"TV Off"	Kendrick Lamar featuring Lefty Gunplay	GNX	2
"Timeless"	The Weeknd and Playboi Carti	Hurry Up Tomorrow	3
"Euphoria"	Kendrick Lamar	—N/a	3
"Wacced Out Murals"	Kendrick Lamar	GNX	4
"Hey Now"	Kendrick Lamar featuring Dody6	GNX	5
"Redrum"	21 Savage	American Dream	5
"Cinderella"	Future, Metro Boomin and Travis Scott	We Don't Trust You	6
"7 Minute Drill"	J. Cole	Might Delete Later	6
"Agora Hills"	Doja Cat	Scarlet	7
"Family Matters"	Drake	—N/a	7
"St. Chroma"	Tyler, the Creator featuring Daniel Caesar	Chromakopia	7
"Reincarnated"	Kendrick Lamar	GNX	8
"We Don't Trust You"	Future and Metro Boomin	We Don't Trust You	8
"Young Metro"	Future, Metro Boomin and The Weeknd	We Don't Trust You	9
"Enough (Miami)"	Cardi B	Am I the Drama?	9
"Man at the Garden"	Kendrick Lamar	GNX	9
"Née-Nah"	21 Savage, Travis Scott and Metro Boomin	American Dream	10
"Noid"	Tyler, the Creator	Chromakopia	10
"Sticky"	Tyler, the Creator featuring GloRilla, Sexyy Red and Lil Wayne	Chromakopia	10
"Wanna Be"	GloRilla and Megan Thee Stallion	Ehhthang Ehhthang	11
"Dodger Blue"	Kendrick Lamar featuring Wallie the Sensei, Siete7x and Roddy Ricch	GNX	11
"Meet the Grahams"	Kendrick Lamar	—N/a	12
"Ice Attack"	Future and Metro Boomin	We Don't Trust You	13
"Peekaboo"	Kendrick Lamar featuring AzChike	GNX	13
"Heart Pt. 6"	Kendrick Lamar	GNX	14
"Lil Boo Thang"	Paul Russell	Again Sometime?	14
"Darling, I"	Tyler, the Creator featuring Teezo Touchdown	Chromakopia	15
"FTCU"	Nicki Minaj	Pink Friday 2	15
"Never Lose Me"	Flo Milli	Fine Ho, Stay	15
"All Red"	Playboi Carti	—N/a	15
"Facts"	Tom MacDonald and Ben Shapiro	—N/a	16
"25"	Rod Wave	Last Lap	16
"Rah Tah Tah"	Tyler, the Creator	Chromakopia	16
"Push Ups"	Drake	—N/a	17
"Whatchu Kno About Me"	GloRilla and Sexyy Red	Glorious	17
"Band4Band"	Central Cee and Lil Baby	Can't Rush Greatness	18
"All of Me"	21 Savage	American Dream	18
"N.H.I.E."	21 Savage and Doja Cat	American Dream	19
"Whatever She Wants"	Bryson Tiller	Bryson Tiller	19
"Crocodile Tearz"	J. Cole	Might Delete Later	19
"Habits"	Eminem and White Gold	The Death of Slim Shady (Coup de Grâce)	19
"Renaissance"	Eminem	The Death of Slim Shady (Coup de Grâce)	20
"Slimed In"	Future and Metro Boomin	We Don't Trust You	20
"Get It Sexyy"	Sexyy Red	In Sexyy We Trust	20
"Whiskey Whiskey"	Moneybagg Yo featuring Morgan Wallen	Speak Now	21
"Fuel"	Eminem and JID	The Death of Slim Shady (Coup de Grâce)	21
"Teflon Don"	Future	Mixtape Pluto	21
"We Still Don't Trust You"	Future, Metro Boomin and The Weeknd	We Still Don't Trust You	22
"TGIF"	GloRilla	Glorious	22
"Big Foot"	Nicki Minaj	—N/a	23
"Fuk Sumn"	Kanye West and Ty Dolla Sign as ¥$ featuring Playboi Carti and Travis Scott	Vultures 1	23
"Big Dawgs"	Hanumankind and Kalmi	Monsoon Season	23
"Too Fast"	Future	Mixtape Pluto	23
"Everybody"	Nicki Minaj featuring Lil Uzi Vert	Pink Friday 2	24
"Claustrophobic"	Future and Metro Boomin	We Don't Trust You	24
"Kehlani"	Jordan Adetunji	A Jaguar's Dream	24
"GNX"	Kendrick Lamar featuring Hitta J3, YoungThreat and Peysoh	GNX	24
"Tobey"	Eminem, Big Sean and BabyTron	The Death of Slim Shady (Coup de Grâce)	24
"Brand New Dance"	Eminem	The Death of Slim Shady (Coup de Grâce)	25
"Lil Demon"	Future	Mixtape Pluto	25
"Ski"	Future	Mixtape Pluto	26
"Back to Me"	Kanye West and Ty Dolla Sign as ¥$ featuring Freddie Gibbs	Vultures 1	26
"One of Wun"	Gunna	One of Wun	26
"Magic Don Juan (Princess Diana)"	Future and Metro Boomin	We Don't Trust You	27
"Somebody Save Me"	Eminem and Jelly Roll	The Death of Slim Shady (Coup de Grâce)	27
"Gloria"	Kendrick Lamar and SZA	GNX	27
"Yeah Glo!"	GloRilla	Ehhthang Ehhthang	28
"It's Up"	Drake, Young Thug and 21 Savage	100 Gigs	28
"Huntin' Wabbitz"	J. Cole	Might Delete Later	28
"Pricey"	J. Cole featuring Ari Lennox, Young Dro and Gucci Mane	Might Delete Later	29
"Plutoski"	Future	Mixtape Pluto	29
"Like Him"	Tyler, the Creator featuring Lola Young	Chromakopia	29
"Talking"	Kanye West and Ty Dolla Sign as ¥$ featuring North West	Vultures 1	30
"Evil"	Eminem	The Death of Slim Shady (Coup de Grâce)	30
"Trouble"	Eminem	The Death of Slim Shady (Coup de Grâce)	31
"Pop Ur Shit"	21 Savage, Young Thug and Metro Boomin	American Dream	31
"Thought I Was Dead"	Tyler, the Creator featuring Schoolboy Q and Santigold	Chromakopia	32
"Hey Jane"	Tyler, the Creator	Chromakopia	33
"Sneaky"	21 Savage	American Dream	33
"Fried (She a Vibe)"	Future and Metro Boomin	We Don't Trust You	33
"Tough"	Quavo and Lana Del Rey	—N/a	33
"Burn"	Kanye West and Ty Dolla Sign as ¥$	Vultures 1	33
"Vultures"	Kanye West and Ty Dolla Sign as ¥$ featuring Bump J and Lil Durk	Vultures 1	34
"Dangerous"	21 Savage, Lil Durk and Metro Boomin	American Dream	35
"H.Y.B."	J. Cole, Bas and Central Cee	Might Delete Later	35
"Last Lap"	Rod Wave	Last Lap	35
"Runnin Outta Time"	Future and Metro Boomin	We Don't Trust You	36
"Mamushi"	Megan Thee Stallion featuring Yuki Chiba	Megan	36
"Neva Play"	Megan Thee Stallion and RM	Megan: Act II	36
"Think U the Shit (Fart)"	Ice Spice	Y2K!	37
"Lucifer"	Eminem and Sly Pyper	The Death of Slim Shady (Coup de Grâce)	37
"Bandit"	Don Toliver	Hardstone Psycho	38
"Like What (Freestyle)"	Cardi B	Am I the Drama?	38
"Everyday Hustle"	Future, Metro Boomin and Rick Ross	We Don't Trust You	38
"Ready '24"	J. Cole featuring Cam'ron	Might Delete Later	38
"Stars"	Kanye West and Ty Dolla Sign as ¥$	Vultures 1	39
"Red Leather"	Future, Metro Boomin and J. Cole	We Still Don't Trust You	39
"Boa"	Megan Thee Stallion	Megan	39
"Antichrist"	Eminem featuring Bizarre	The Death of Slim Shady (Coup de Grâce)	39
"Surround Sound"	JID featuring 21 Savage and Baby Tate	The Forever Story	40
"Should've Wore a Bonnet"	21 Savage and Brent Faiyaz	American Dream	40
"GTA"	Future and Metro Boomin	We Don't Trust You	40
"Judge Judy"	Tyler, the Creator	Chromakopia	40

=== United Kingdom ===
Hip hop songs from any year which charted in the 2024 Top 10 of the UK Singles Chart
Song	Artist	Project	Peak position
"Band4Band"	Central Cee and Lil Baby	Can't Rush Greatness	3
"Thick of It"	KSI featuring Trippie Redd	—N/a	6
"Kehlani"	Jordan Adetunji	A Jaguar's Dream	8

== Highest first-week consumption ==
List of albums with the highest first-week consumption (sales + streaming + track equivalent), as of December 2024 in the United States
Number	Album	Artist	1st-week consumption	1st-week position	Refs
1	Days Before Rodeo	Travis Scott	361,000	2	
2	GNX	Kendrick Lamar	319,000	1	
3	Chromakopia	Tyler, the Creator	299,500	1	
4	The Death of Slim Shady (Coup de Grâce)	Eminem	281,000	1	
5	We Don't Trust You	Future & Metro Boomin	251,000	1	
6	Vultures 1	Kanye West & Ty Dolla Sign	148,000	1	
7	American Dream	21 Savage	133,000	1	
8	Mixtape Pluto	Future	129,000	1	
9	We Still Don't Trust You	Future & Metro Boomin	127,500	1	
10	Last Lap	Rod Wave	127,000	2	

== All critically reviewed albums ranked ==
=== Metacritic ===
Number	Artist	Album	Average score	Number of reviews	Reference
1	Pa Salieu	Afrikan Alien	90	4 reviews	
2	Kendrick Lamar	GNX	87	22 reviews	
3	ScHoolboy Q	Blue Lips	87	7 reviews	
4	Tyler, the Creator	Chromakopia	85	17 reviews	
5	Kim Gordon	The Collective	84	18 reviews	
6	Tierra Whack	World Wide Whack	84	14 reviews	
7	Elucid	Revelator	83	5 reviews	
8	Vince Staples	Dark Times	82	11 reviews	
9	Benny the Butcher	Everybody Can't Go	82	6 reviews	
10	Mustafa	Dunya	81	7 reviews	
11	Ghetts	On Purpose, with Purpose	81	6 reviews	
12	Cash Cobain	Play Cash Cobain	81	4 reviews	
13	Kneecap	Fine Art	79	8 reviews	
14	Doechii	Alligator Bites Never Heal	79	6 reviews	
15	JPEGMafia	I Lay Down My Life for You	78	8 reviews	
16	Common & Pete Rock	The Auditorium Vol. 1	78	6 reviews	
17	LL Cool J	The FORCE	76	8 reviews	
18	Toro y Moi	Hole Erth	76	6 reviews	
19	James Blake & Lil Yachty	Bad Cameo	75	6 reviews	
20	Roc Marciano	Marciology	75	5 reviews	
21	Denzel Curry	King of the Mischievous South Vol. 2	74	8 reviews	
22	21 Savage	American Dream	73	5 reviews	
23	Future	Mixtape Pluto	73	4 reviews	
24	Childish Gambino	Bando Stone & the New World	72	11 reviews	
25	Snoop Dogg	Missionary	72	7 reviews	
26	GloRilla	Glorious	72	5 reviews	
27	Latto	Sugar Honey Iced Tea	72	5 reviews	
28	OneDa	Formula OneDa	72	4 reviews	
29	Killer Mike	Songs for Sinners & Saints	71	4 reviews	
30	Shabazz Palaces	Exotic Birds of Prey	67	7 reviews	
31	070 Shake	Petrichor	67	6 reviews	
32	Megan Thee Stallion	Megan	67	6 reviews	
33	Ice Spice	Y2K!	65	17 reviews	
34	Future & Metro Boomin	We Don't Trust You	64	7 reviews	
35	Kid Cudi	Insano	64	7 reviews	
36	Future & Metro Boomin	We Still Don't Trust You	64	6 reviews	
37	Yeat	Lyfestyle	63	5 reviews	
38	Yeat	2093	62	6 reviews	
39	Gunna	One of Wun	58	4 reviews	
40	Ghostface Killah	Set the Tone (Guns & Roses)	55	6 reviews	
41	J. Cole	Might Delete Later	54	4 reviews	
42	Kanye West & Ty Dolla $ign	Vultures 1	52	9 reviews	
43	Lil Uzi Vert	Eternal Atake 2	48	5 reviews	
44	Eminem	The Death of Slim Shady (Coup de Grâce)	46	16 reviews	
45	Kanye West & Ty Dolla $ign	Vultures 2	39	6 reviews	

=== AnyDecentMusic? ===
Number	Artist	Album	Average score	Number of reviews	Reference
1	Kendrick Lamar	GNX	8.5	17 reviews	
2	Kneecap	Fine Art	8.2	10 reviews	
3	Tyler, the Creator	Chromakopia	8.0	18 reviews	
4	Moor Mother	The Great Bailout	7.9	11 reviews	
5	Kim Gordon	The Collective	7.8	18 reviews	
6	Twenty One Pilots	Clancy	7.7	9 reviews	
7	Tierra Whack	World Wide Whack	7.6	13 reviews	
8	Vince Staples	Dark Times	7.6	9 reviews	
9	Mustafa	Dunya	7.5	6 reviews	
10	Childish Gambino	Bando Stone & the New World	6.9	10 reviews	
11	Denzel Curry	King of the Mischievous South Vol. 2	6.6	8 reviews	
12	Megan Thee Stallion	Megan	6.4	7 reviews	
13	070 Shake	Petrichor	6.4	6 reviews	
14	Snoop Dogg	Missionary	6.4	6 reviews	
15	Ice Spice	Y2K!	5.8	15 reviews	
16	Eminem	The Death of Slim Shady (Coup de Grâce)	4.8	11 reviews	

== See also ==
- Previous article: 2023 in hip-hop
- Next article: 2025 in hip-hop
- Drake–Kendrick Lamar feud
