= Magic Johnson (disambiguation) =

Magic Johnson (born 1959) is an American businessman and former basketball player.

Magic Johnson may also refer to:

- Shaun "Magic" Johnson (born 1990), New Zealand rugby league footballer
- "Magic Johnson", song by the Red Hot Chili Peppers on the album Mother's Milk
- "Magic Johnson", song by Ian on the mixtape Valedictorian
- "Earvin Magic Johnson", song by Nas on the album Magic 2
