= Ian (rapper) =

American rapper (born 2005)

- Also known as: shyboy19, Suburbancerberus
- Born: Ian O'Neill Smith; May 29, 2005 (age 21); St. Louis, Missouri, U.S.
- Origin: Dallas, Texas, U.S
- Genres: Hip hop; trap; SoundCloud rap; rage
- Occupations: Rapper; singer; songwriter; record producer
- Instrument: Vocals
- Years active: 2022–present
- Labels: BuVision; Columbia; Dogdog
- Website: ian.family

Ian O'Neill Smith (born May 29, 2005), known mononymously as Ian (stylized in all lowercase), is an American rapper, singer, songwriter, and record producer.

== Early life ==
Born in St. Louis, Missouri, he attended Jesuit College Preparatory School of Dallas where he played rugby and crew. He attended Clemson University, where he also played rugby before pursuing his music career full-time.

== Career ==
Ian began his music career in 2018, releasing tracks on SoundCloud under the alias Suburbancerberus. Initially, he created mixes featuring popular artists such as Chief Keef. By 2019, Ian had transitioned to producing music for other performers, a role he continued to fulfill through 2022, producing for artists like Izaya Tiji.

On May 13, 2024, he released the music video to his single "Figure It Out" which contained a cameo from former NFL running back Marshawn Lynch on Lyrical Lemonade. On May 17, 2024, he released his debut mixtape ValedictorIan with production from Sxprano and American rapper and producer tana.

In June 2024, he released "Fit Check" with VonOff1700. Also in 2024, he released the song "Magic Johnson," which became viral on TikTok; this single would be tacked onto the deluxe edition of Valedictorian.

Ian released "Hate Me" with Lil Yachty in July 2024, which was accompanied by a video from Lyrical Lemonade. On October 18, 2024, released his debut studio album, Goodbye Horses.

== Discography ==
=== Mixtapes ===
List of mixtapes, with selected details and chart positions
Title	Mixtape details	Peak chart positions		
Title	Mixtape details	US	US R&B/HH	US Rap
Valedictorian	Released: May 17, 2024; Label: BuVision, Columbia, Dogdog; Format: Digital download, streaming	54	18	15
Goodbye Horses	Released: October 18, 2024; Label: BuVision, Columbia, Dogdog; Format: Digital download, streaming	86	30	24
2005	Released: October 24, 2025; Label: BuVision, Columbia, Dogdog; Format: Digital download, streaming	—	—	—

=== Extended plays ===
List of EPs, with selected details
Title	EP details
Only for a While	Released: August 4, 2022; Label: Self-released; Format: Digital download, streaming
Remembrance	Released: September 24, 2022; Label: Self-released; Format: Digital download, streaming
Empty Suit (with gyo)	Released: November 23, 2023; Label: Dogdog Records; Format: Digital download, streaming

=== Singles ===
List of singles, with selected peak chart positions
Title	Year	Peak chart positions			Album
Title	Year	US	US R&B/HH	NZ Hot	Album
"Figure It Out"	2024	—	—	—	Valedictorian
"Grand Slam"	2024	—	—	—	Valedictorian
"Hate Me" (with Lil Yachty)	2024	68	18	9	Goodbye Horses
"End Up Gone"	2024	—	—	—	Goodbye Horses
"No Way"	2024	—	—	—	TBA
"Pack It Up"	2025	—	—	37	TBA

=== Other charted or certified songs ===
List of other charted or certified songs, with selected peak chart positions
Title	Year	Peak chart positions		Certifications	Album
Title	Year	US Bub.	US R&B/HH	Certifications	Album
"Never Stop"	2024	14	39		Valedictorian
"Magic Johnson"	2024	1	25	RIAA: Platinum	Valedictorian
"3.5"	2024	—	—	RIAA: Gold	Goodbye Horses
