= Hate Me (Lil Yachty and Ian song) =

2024 single by Lil Yachty and Ian

Single by Lil Yachty and Ian

from the album Goodbye Horses
- Released: July 26, 2024
- Length: 2:41
- Label: Quality Control; Motown; BuVision; Columbia; Dogdog
- Songwriters: Miles McCollum; Ian Smith; Deshawn Jackson
- Producer: Childboy

Lil Yachty singles chronology
"Lets Get On Dey Ass" (2024)	"Hate Me" (2024)	"High3r" (2024)

Ian singles chronology
"Fit Check" (2024)	"Hate Me" (2024)

Music video
- "Hate Me" on YouTube

"Hate Me" is a song by American rappers Lil Yachty and Ian, released on July 26, 2024 with an accompanying music video directed by Cole Bennett. It was produced by Childboy. The track was later included on Ian's mixtape Goodbye Horses.

== Composition ==
The lyrics find the artists bragging to and criticizing their enemies, while the beat has been described by critics as "humming, fizzing" and "cyber-equestrian bounce". Ian performs in a calm flow that has been compared to that of rapper Swapa. At one point Lil Yachty boasts he is "richer than your favorite rapper", followed with the line "If I'm not, then, God, kill my momma".

== Critical reception ==
Mano Sundaresan of Pitchfork praised the song for Ian's "gleefully fried punchlines that made his breakout song 'Figure It Out' instantly memorable" and commented "Yachty is comparatively a non-factor, a flashy name to attract Kai Cenat devotees and Despicable Me 4 fans to the Cole Bennett–directed video". Aaron Williams of Uproxx also reacted favorably toward Ian's performance, writing the song "gives the young rapper plenty of space to show off his lyrical talents."

== Charts ==
Chart performance for "Hate Me"
Chart (2024)	Peak position
New Zealand Hot Singles (RMNZ)	9
US Billboard Hot 100	68
US Hot R&B/Hip-Hop Songs (Billboard)	18
