= Protect (rapper) =

American rapper (born 2003)

- Also known as: seeingfacess; Tect; HeyCartier; Lil Tec
- Born: Ricky Shanklin; August 20, 2003 (age 23)
- Genres: Hip-hop; trap; rage
- Occupation: Rapper
- Years active: 2018–present
- Label: Atlantic Records
- Member of: Ball Hog

Ricky Shanklin (born August 20, 2003), professionally known as Protect, is an American rapper from Buffalo, New York. He first rose to fame in 2024 with the release of his second album, Ball Hog For Life, which was critically acclaimed for its "melodic" style and "pristine hooks".

== Early life ==
Shanklin was born on August 20, 2003.

== Career ==
=== Beginnings and breakthrough (2017-2025) ===
Shanklin began recording music in 2017 at age 14. The first ever song that he recorded was titled "Ignorant Freestyle". On March 29, 2024, Shanklin released his debut album, All On Me, followed by his second album Ball Hog For Life, which was critically acclaimed for its melodic flows, catchy hooks, and relatability amongst fans. Shanklin signed a record deal with Atlantic Records later that year.

=== 500 Days of Summer & Slimedude2003 (2025-present) ===
Shanklin released his third album (and first under Atlantic) on August 15, 2025, titled 500 Days of Summer, which took inspiration from the movie of the same name. Entering 2026, Shanklin was revealed to make his debut at Rolling Loud Orlando, which was held from May 8-10. Shanklin released his first track of the year on February 6, 2026, titled "Pwned". On February 21, it was announced that Protect would be performing at First Class Fest in Toronto on August 29, marking his second major performance. On June 5, 2026, Shanklin surprise released his mixtape, Slimedude2003.

== Artistry ==
Vivian Medithi of The Fader wrote that Shanklin's musical style "sat somewhere between" between rage and melodic artists such as OsamaSon and Destroy Lonely, and mentioned his collaborations with some of the most popular producers in underground hip-hop, like wegonebeok, Cade, prettifun, CXO, and Rio Leyva. Alphonse Pierre of Pitchfork wrote that Shanklin's sound was reminiscent to that of "the Pi'erre Bourne 2.0 wave of tdf’s Culture and the debauchery of Ken Carson."

== Personal life ==
Shanklin is affiliated with popular online streamer, BruceDropEmOff, the two formed a collective called Ball Hog. Shanklin is a fan of the Buffalo Bills and enjoys video games such as Sly Cooper, Skyrim, Fall Guys, and Resident Evil 9, his favorite character from the Resident Evil franchise is Leon.

== Discography ==
=== Studio albums ===
Title	Details
All On Me	Released: March 29, 2024; Label: Self-released; Formats: Digital download
Ball Hog For Life	Released: December 20, 2024; Label: Self-released; Formats: Digital download
500 Days of Summer	Released: August 15, 2025; Label: Atlantic Records; Formats: Digital download

=== Mixtapes ===
Title	Details
Slimedude2003	Released: June 5, 2026; Label: Atlantic Records; Format: Digital download, streaming
