= Quin NFN =

American rapper (born 2001)

- Quin NFN in 2024

Background information
- Also known as: Quincho; Lil Quin
- Born: Quinlan Sharif McAfee; January 18, 2001 (age 25); Austin, Texas, U.S.
- Genres: Hip hop; trap
- Occupations: Rapper; singer; songwriter
- Years active: 2016–present
- Labels: NFN Entertainment, Empire Distribution, 10K Projects

Quinlan Sharif McAfee (born January 18, 2001), known professionally as Quin NFN (formerly Quincho), is an American rapper, singer, and songwriter from Austin, Texas. He is best known for his singles "Talkin' My Shit," "Straight Thru," and "Poles" (featuring NLE Choppa).

He released his debut commercial mixtape, 4Nun, on October 25, 2019. He released his second mixtape, Quincho, on March 27, 2020. He released his debut studio album, Never on Time, on March 17, 2023.

== Early life ==
Quinlan McAfee was born in Austin, Texas, on January 18, 2001. He started rhyming and writing rap songs at six years old. As stated in interviews, he cites Lil Wayne as "the first inspiration to basically make me wanna rap." He has also said that rapper Young Pappy inspired him "to get in the studio and talk shit." The first album he purchased was Lil Wayne's Tha Carter III.

== Career ==
=== 2016-2017: Early fame and debut EP ===
According to McAfee, he did not start recording music until the end of 2016. By that time, he started gaining attention in his hometown of Austin, Texas. However, his first hit song did not come until he released the single "Game Time Pt. 2" in August 2017. He followed this up with the releases of songs such as "Gang Shit", "Revenge", and "Lil Gangsta", with the former two being featured on his debut EP Stain or Starve.

=== 2018-2019: Big success and debut mixtape ===
McAfee gained national success after the release of two of his biggest singles to date, "Talkin' My Shit" and "Straight Thru", which both had music videos uploaded onto the popular Jmoney1041 YouTube channel in late 2018, helping them gain traction. These singles helped McAfee sign a record deal with 10K Projects. He followed this success up with hit singles such as "How I'm Living" and "NFN ENT", both of which accumulated over a million views on YouTube.

On October 25, 2019, McAfee released his debut mixtape, 4Nun. The tape included features from NLE Choppa and PnB Rock, and one of the singles from the tape, "Poles" featuring NLE Choppa, went on to become one of McAfee's most popular singles.

=== 2020-present: Second mixtape ===
McAfee released his second mixtape, Quincho, on March 27, 2020. The tape included no features and four previously released tracks. A sequel was teased on May 20, 2020 with the release of his single "G Route" featuring Mozzy, and "Sewed Up" with frequent collaborator Lil 2z. He continued to release singles and do features throughout 2021 and 2022 which led to the release of his collaborative mixtape, 2's & 4's. with Lil 2z.

McAfee released his debut studio album, Never On Time, on March 17, 2023. The album included one feature from Money Man and two previously released tracks.

== Discography ==
=== Studio albums ===
Title	Album details
Never On Time	Released: March 17, 2023; Label: NFN Entertainment, Empire Distribution; Format: Digital download, streaming
Second To None	Released: July 26, 2024; Label: NFN Entertainment, Empire Distribution; Format: Digital download, streaming
Quincho II	Released: September 5, 2025; Label: NFN Entertainment, Empire Distribution; Format: Digital Download, streaming

=== Mixtapes ===
Title	Mixtape details
4Nun	Released: October 25, 2019; Label: 10K Projects; Format: Digital download, streaming
Quincho	Released: March 27, 2020; Label: 10K Projects; Format: Digital download, streaming
2's & 4's (with Lil 2z)	Released: December 16, 2022; Label: NFN Entertainment, Empire Distribution; Format: Digital download, streaming
Rebirth	Released: October 4, 2024; Label: NFN Entertainment, Empire Distribution; Format: Digital download, streaming

=== Extended plays ===
Title	Mixtape details
Stain or Starve	Released: December 12, 2018; Label: Self-released; Format: Digital download, streaming

=== Singles ===
==== As lead artist ====
Title	Year	Album
"Game Time 3"	2018	Non-album single
"Revenge"	2018	Stain or Starve
"Lil Gangsta"	2018	Non-album singles
"Game Time 4"	2018	Non-album singles
"Straight Thru"	2019	Non-album singles
"Talkin' My Shit"	2019	4Nun
"How I'm Living"	2019	4Nun
"Check"	2019	4Nun
"Stay Down"	2019	4Nun
"Hold You Down" (featuring PnB Rock)	2019	4Nun
"Poles" (featuring NLE Choppa)	2019	4Nun
"Crash Dummy"	2019	Quincho
"Ok Cool"	2020	Quincho
"All Blues"	2020	Quincho
"Give It Back"	2020	Non-album singles
"Sewed Up" (featuring Lil 2z)	2020	Non-album singles
"Detroit Flow"	2020	Non-album singles
"G Route" (featuring Mozzy)	2020	Non-album singles
"Right Now" (featuring Stunna 4 Vegas)	2021	Non-album singles
"Laid Back"	2021	Non-album singles
"Having My Way" (featuring Derez De'Shon)	2021	Non-album singles
"Back And Better" (featuring Lil 2z)	2021	Non-album singles
"How I Came" (featuring Big Yavo)	2021	Non-album singles
"DAWM"	2021	Non-album singles
"Lessons"	2021	Non-album singles
"Never On Time"	2021	Non-album singles
"Scrimmage" (featuring Lil 2z & LilCJ Kasino)	2022	2's & 4's
"Walk The Line"	2022	Never On Time
"ROKU"	2022	Never On Time
"Sewed Up, Pt. 2 (Back Again)" (featuring Lil 2z)	2022	2's & 4's
"PNO" (featuring LilCJ Kasino, F3NDI & Sauce Walka)	2022	Non-album single
"Revenue" (featuring Money Man)	2023	Never On Time
"House Call" (featuring 03 Greedo)	2023	Second To None

==== As featured artist ====
Title	Year	Album
"Connect Four" (Rap Beezy featuring Lil Bre Da Young Beast, Lil 2z, & Quin NFN)	2019	Non-album single
"New Red Bottoms" (Bedo featuring Go Yayo, Lil 2z, and Quin NFN)	2020	TBA
"Jangalang" (Icon South featuring Quin NFN, and Neko Savvy)	2020	Non-album single

=== Guest appearances ===
Title	Year	Other artist(s)	Album
"FNs & Blixkys"	2019	22Gz	The Blixky Tape
