= Clemson Rugby =

Clemson
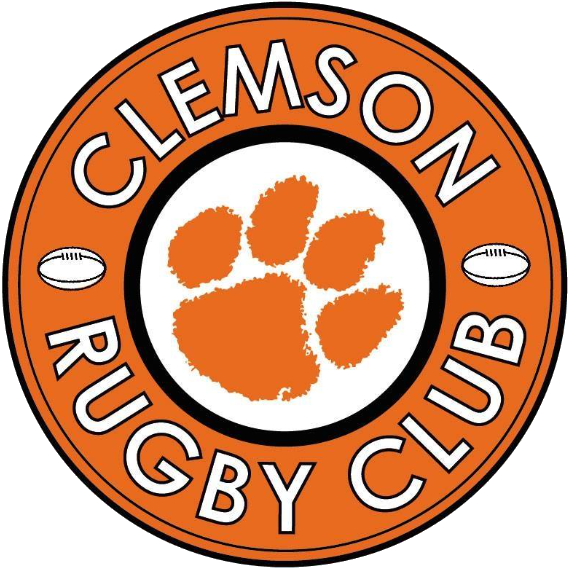
- Full name: Clemson University Rugby Football Club
- Nickname(s): Tiger
- Founded: 1967; 58 years ago
- Location: Clemson
- Region: South Carolina
- Ground(s): National Athletic Village Field
1st kit	2nd kit

Official website
- www.clemsonrugby.com

The Clemson University Rugby Football Club (often abbreviated as Clemson Rugby) was founded in 1967. Clemson finished the 2005 Season ranked #14, the 2006 Season ranked #13 in the nation, and the 2007 season #17. Clemson's best season was in 1996 when the team advanced to the quarterfinals of the national playoffs and finished ranked 7th nationally. Rugby is one of the oldest club sports at Clemson University. The team has gone 57–15 in the last three years, with the only losses coming to men's teams and top 20 ranked college rugby teams. There was also an article about Clemson Rugby in the Greenville News in the Spring of 2006.

Troy Hall has served as the head coach of Clemson Rugby since 2020.

== Championships ==
- USA Rugby South champions: 1996, 1998, and 2006.
- Georgia Rugby Union tourney winners: 2003, 2004, 2005 and 2006.
- Huntsville Rugby Tournament champion: 2003.
- ACRL champion: 2013, 2014, 2015
- ACRL runner-up: (spring) 2012, 2013
- Palmetto Bowl champion vs South Carolina at 2014 ACRC Bowl Series

National Playoffs:

- USA College Rugby Quarterfinals appearances: 1996, 1989, 2013.
- Round of 16 appearances: 1996 (Cornell/Penn State), 1998 (Dartmouth/Colorado State), 2005 (Army/Penn State), 2006 (Navy/UC Santa Barbara) and 2007 (Navy/Army).
- Quarter Finals appearance in the 2015 Varsity Cup (Defeated Arkansas State/Lost to Navy).
- Quarter Finals appearance in the 2016 Varsity Cup (Defeated Dartmouth/Lost to California).
- Appearances in the Collegiate Rugby Championship Sevens Tournament: 2015, 2016, 2017.

== History ==
In spring 1967 four friends, Frank N. Mora III (Puerto Rico), Jeremy Pike (Australia), Nick Schoular (United Kingdom), and Geoff Tyers (United Kingdom) led the effort to bring the sport of rugby to Clemson University. During the first few years the team struggled through many years of hardships like most new teams working to increase membership, secure matches and develop coaching skills. As time passed, however, the team improved. In 1971, Clemson Rugby secured a significant upset victory over Yale — the 1970 Ivy League champions who were on a 19-game winning streak. Clemson Rugby soon became a major force in collegiate rugby.

During the first half of the 1970s the club was one of only a handful in the South. As a result, it led to the team consistently competing against University of North Carolina, Charleston Rugby Club, N.C. State, Atlanta Old White and Medical College of Georgia. In 1973 Clemson rugby alumni Jim McMillan helped found the rugby team at the Medical College of Georgia. In 1972 the club took its first international tour to the Bahamas. The club lost a very tight match to the Freeport Rugby Club due to a very questionable call by the referee in the last minute of the match. The Freeport rugby club at that time had never lost to a U.S. team.

In November 1980 the team hosted the ACC rugby tournament in Clemson. After a series of challenging matches the team ended up facing the University of Virginia in the finals. The match was played in very cold and yet conditions; however, Clemson emerged victorious. During the mid-1980s the club continued to play full spring and fall schedules, adding to the list of rival clubs Belmont Abbey, Wake Forest, Olde Grey, Johnson City and the Citadel. A tour to Florida was made in spring 1985.

In 1989, Clemson rugby finished 12th in the country with an undefeated record. The 1990s were a time for change within Clemson rugby. Former Clemson player Frank Graziano (class of 1977) became the program's first ever head coach in 1991. Graziano instilled an idea of field dominance nationally. During Coach Graziano's time with the team, Clemson rugby achieved several major accomplishments: Clemson's first undefeated season, Georgia Rugby Union champions, a number one ranking in the Southeast, and entrance into the quarterfinals of the national playoffs where the Tigers matched up against Penn State after a first-round victory over Cornell University.

In Clemson rugby's 30th year and in the same school year of Coach Graziano's departure for a USA Rugby Collegiate Director position, the Tigers remained strong. The Tigers performed well against university teams throughout the south. A difficult fall led to a successful spring semester in which Clemson Rugby would again be in the national spotlight. After defeating every southern team they faced, the Tigers headed to the Round of 16 of the national playoffs.

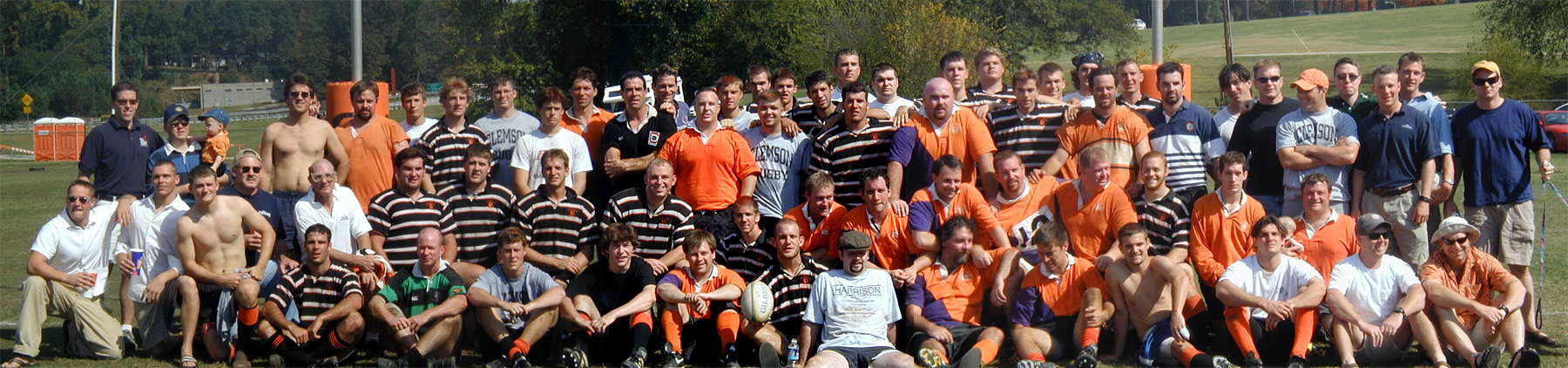
Clemson Players and Alumni in 2006

Clemson's best season was 1996, when the team advanced to the national college rugby quarterfinals. Clemson also advanced to the round of 16 of the national playoffs for three consecutive years from 2005 to 2007. Clemson has played since 2011 in the Atlantic Coast Rugby League against its traditional ACC rivals. Clemson placed second in its conference in the spring 2012 season with a 6-1 conference record, missing out to Maryland for the conference title and a place in the national college rugby playoffs. Clemson finished the spring 2013 season with a 6-1 conference record, and then defeated South Carolina 29–7 in the round of 16 national playoffs, before losing in the quarterfinals to Central Florida 20–24.

Clemson currently competes as a Division IAA team in the Southeastern Collegiate Rugby Conference, which is affiliated with National Collegiate Rugby.

== Team record ==
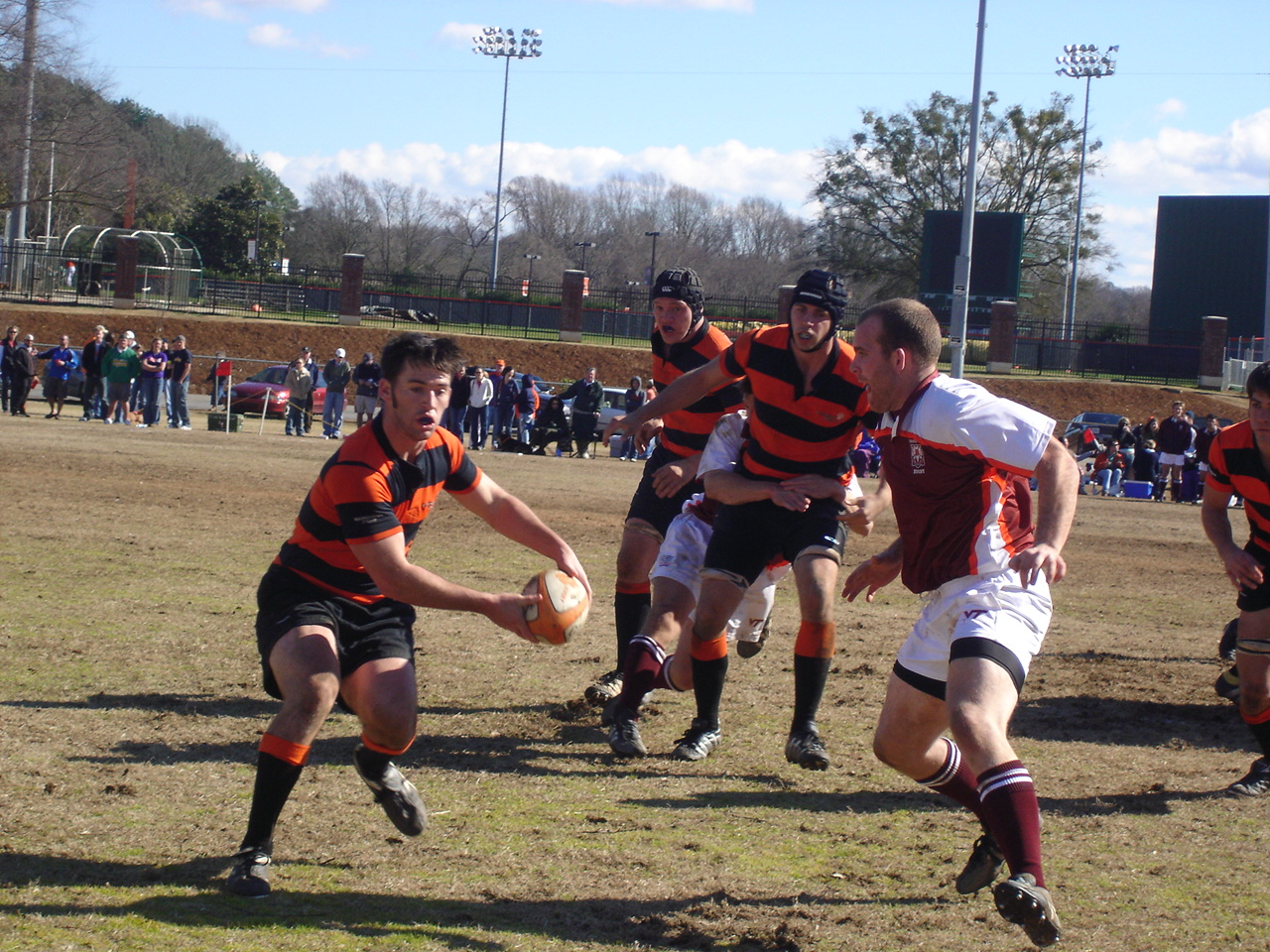
Dutch Jones, Daniel Hare, Bryan Burton for Clemson against Virginia Tech in Spring 2006

2005-2006: 14-4 Clemson outscored their opponents 766–313. 0–2 in National Tournament, 35–46 against Navy and 22–32 against UC Santa Barbara.
2004-2005: 17-8-1 Second in the South. 0–2 in National Tournament, 18–35 against Army and 26–46 to Penn State.
2003-2004: 20-2
Spring 2001: 3-3
Spring 1998: 7-0 Defeated Citadel 100-0 and Emory 94-0
Fall 1997: 3-3
Spring 1997: 5-3
Fall 1996: 5-5
Fall 1995: 6-1-1
Spring 1995: 10-0 Defeated USC 85-0

== Records ==
Clemson went 14–0 in the fall 2003 for the best winning percentage ever for the Fall Season. Clemson won 19 games In the fall of 2004 for the most ever in the Fall Season.

Clemson set the team scoring record in 2006 with a 118–3 victory over the University of Florida. Clemson's previous record was in 1998 when they defeated Citadel 100–0.

== Foundation and Alumni ==
Clemson Rugby has grown off the field as well. The Tigers have made several large strides in improving Clemson Rugby's organization. The team has set up an alumni fund to allow graduates to give back to the club. The annual alumni gathering at homecoming is a highly anticipated event where former players and supporters are hosted at several events including a dinner, inter-collegiate rugby match, an alumni match against the college team, and a post match cookout which allows the past players to socialize with the present players and tell old war stories. The Clemson Rugby Foundation helps increase the support of the Clemson Rugby teams. The Clemson Rugby Foundation is a non-profit 501(c)(3) organization, and was founded during Clemson Rugby's 40th year. The Foundation has allowed the alumni and supporters a more organized way of supporting rugby at Clemson, including the creation of several scholarships, coaching stipends, and other grants.

== Players ==
Clemson has had numerous South All-Stars, U-19 All-stars and GRU All-stars during the team's history:

- Clemson had its first Collegiate All-American in 2005 in Scrumhalf Dutch Jones.
- Clemson had its second Collegiate All-American in 2008 with Second Row Michael Fitzgerald.
- Clemson had its third Collegiate U20 All-American in 2014 with #8 Jason Damm
- Clemson's 8-man Scott Wagemann made the All-Marine Team and the All-Armed Services Team.

Clemson Alumni have gone on to play in the top league in the country: Rugby Super League in the last few years:

- Will Phillips plays with the Olympic Club,
- Tyson Campbell plays with the Philadelphia-Whitemarsh
- Jason Hinchman and Dutch Jones play with the Charlotte Rugby Club

Coaches:

- Former Clemson player and coach Jim Gaine coached the All-American team in 2004.

== All-South Selections ==

2008 South All-Stars
Mike Fitzgerald, Ben "Broadway" Walence
2007 South All-Stars
Mike "Irish" Ireson, Mike Fitzgerald, Geoff Clott, Ben "Broadway" Walence
2006 South All-Stars
Jason Hinchman, Dutch Jones, Mike Fitzgerald, Robert Bortins, Matt "Wayne" Bassett
2005 South All-Stars
Jason Hinchman, Dutch Jones, Mike "Irish" Ireson, Bryan Burton
2004 South All-Stars
Jason Hinchman, Dutch Jones, Shawn Hanna, Scott Waggeman, Ryan Wolf
2003 South All-Stars
None
2002 South All-Stars
None
2001 South All-Stars
Will Phillips and Neil Yanik
2000 South All-Stars
Will Phillips, Johnathon Mullikin, and Neil Yanik
1999 South All-Stars
Unknown
1998 South All-Stars
Andras Bende, Jim Gaine, Will Phillips
1997 South All-Stars
Andras Bende, Jim Gaine, David Merchant, Will Phillips

== Previous seasons ==
=== Fall season summary 2004 ===
Dec 03, 2004 First XV results:
Record: 8-1-1
Points For: 378
Points against: 115
Avg. PF 37.8
Avg. PA 11.5
Avg. Margin of Victory: 26.3
Held Opponents under 10: 4 times
Shutouts: 2 times
CU Scored over 50: 3 times
Men's Club victories: 2 and 1 tie
Collegiate D1 victories: 2
Losses: 1 (Radford University 15–18, eventual Virginia State champs. defeated University of Virginia, Virginia Tech both D1 College Teams.
Ties: 1 (Memphis RFC 20 - 20)
Tournament Championships: 1 GRU
All-Star selections: 12

=== 2003-2004 season summary ===
The team finished with a 20–2 record over the course of the season, the best record in team history. Outscoring their opponents 819–245 in 22 games, the Tigers averaged a 26-point margin of victory. While recording five shutouts, their largest victories came over Georgia 85–0 and Florida 72–5. The team won two tournaments and had nine games where the Tigers kept their opponents under ten points. The two losses came in the playoffs to the University of North Carolina and the University of Tennessee, and CURFC would have to wait another year to make it to the Sweet 16. Clemson Rugby also traveled to Louisiana on their first fall break tour since 1995 and returned undefeated against LSU and Tulane.

Clemson has been successful due in part to their recruiting efforts and attitude towards the sport. "We have gone away from the idea that the students will come out if they are interested." Coach Jim Gaine stated. "We do our best to market the sport as an avenue for the students to continue competition and be a part of the Clemson experience, not just another thing to do after class." The Tigers have five players representing the south collegiate all-stars in Boulder, Colorado, this June at the National All-Star Championship.
