= We Still Don't Trust You =

Studio album by Future and Metro Boomin
- Released: April 12, 2024
- Recorded: 2024
- Genres: Hip-hop; R&B; trap
- Length: 88:33
- Labels: Freebandz; Boominati; Epic; Republic
- Producers: Metro Boomin; Allen Ritter; Chris Xz; Chopsquad DJ; Dre Blak; Dre Moon; Honorable C.N.O.T.E.; Lil88; Mike Dean; Mike McTaggart; Nik D; Nils; Notinbed; Oz; Peter Lee Johnson; Prince85; Southside; Taurus; Tommy Parker; Wheezy; Will-A-Fool

Future chronology
We Don't Trust You (2024)	We Still Don't Trust You (2024)	Mixtape Pluto (2024)

Metro Boomin chronology
We Don't Trust You (2024)	We Still Don't Trust You (2024)	A Futuristic Summa (2025)

Singles from We Still Don't Trust You
- 1. "We Still Don't Trust You" Released: April 19, 2024

We Still Don't Trust You is the second collaborative studio album by American rapper Future and American record producer Metro Boomin. It was released on April 12, 2024, through Freebandz, Epic Records, Boominati Worldwide, and Republic Records. The album contains guest appearances from the Weeknd, Chris Brown, Brownstone, Ty Dolla Sign, J. Cole, Lil Baby, ASAP Rocky and a Drake interpolation. Production was primarily handled by Metro himself, with help from Mike Dean, Wheezy, Dre Moon, Southside, Chopsquad DJ, Allen Ritter, Oz, Honorable C.N.O.T.E., and others. It followed Future and Metro Boomin's first collaboration, We Don't Trust You, which was released three weeks before We Still Don't Trust You.

A double album, with the first disc being R&B-focused and the second disc being hip-hop- and trap-focused, it was supported by one single, its title track, with the Weeknd. The album received generally favorable reviews from critics and debuted atop the US Billboard 200, like its predecessor.

== Background and promotion ==
In January 2023, Metro Boomin first teased news of a collaborative album with Future. Metro later promised that their collaborative album would be released that year, but that did not happen.

Two collaborative albums were announced by Future and Metro on March 8, 2024. The first album was We Don't Trust You, with a release date of March 22; a second album was expected on April 12. The journalist Elliott Wilson further confirmed the information. On April 4, Future and Metro formally revealed the second album's title and release date through a trailer, showing the duo in white suits. Metro later confirmed on Twitter that We Still Don't Trust You was its own project, not a deluxe edition of We Don't Trust You. They formally revealed the album's cover art on April 10, 2024. A day later, they revealed the album's tracklist.

In the summer of 2024, Future and Metro embarked on the We Trust You Tour in support of We Still Don't Trust You and its predecessor.

=== Singles ===
The music video for the album's title track was released on April 13, 2024. It was delivered to Italian radio on April 19, 2024, as the album's lead single.

== Composition ==
Musically, We Still Don't Trust You is noted for expanding out of the duo's "customary hip-hop and trap" genres, in favor of a trap-influenced R&B sound. The album's first disc further incorporates elements of synth-pop, while its second disc is noted as returning to the trap music present in We Don't Trust You.

== Critical reception ==
Professional ratings
Aggregate scores
Source	Rating
Metacritic	64/100
Review scores
Source	Rating
AllMusic	3/5 stars
Clash	5/10
Pitchfork	7.1/10
Sputnikmusic	1.5/5

According to the review aggregator Metacritic, We Still Don't Trust You received "generally favorable reviews" based on a weighted average score of 64 out of 100 from 5 critic scores. Writing for Clash, Robin Murray compared the album to its prequel, saying that the album was "even more bloated" despite some positive elements. Murray noted that although there were several memorable tracks, "there's a huge amount [of songs] that simply passes you by" due to a lack of structure and substance. Sputnikmusic's Dakota West Foss wrote that the album had "little to offer" and wrote that the length of the album fed into his negative review; Foss described it as "somewhat of a tortuous war of attrition". Foss described the album as "airy", "forgettable", and a prime example of "quantity over quality".

== Commercial performance ==
In the United States, We Still Don't Trust You debuted at number one on the Billboard 200 with 124,500 album-equivalent units, which included 162.57 million on-demand streams and 2,500 pure album sales. It marked Future's tenth and Metro Boomin's fifth number-one album in the country.

== Track listing ==
We Still Don't Trust You track listing
No.	Title	Writer(s)	Producer(s)	Length
1.	"We Still Don't Trust You" (with the Weeknd)	Nayvadius Wilburn; Leland Wayne; Abel Tesfaye; Michael Dean	Metro Boomin; Mike Dean	4:12
2.	"Drink N Dance"	Wilburn; Wayne; Robert Richardson; Christopher Townsend	Metro Boomin; Chris Xz	3:40
3.	"Out of My Hands"	Wilburn; Wayne; Townsend	Metro Boomin; Chris Xz	4:03
4.	"Jealous"	Wilburn; Wayne; Wesley Glass; Darrel Carter; Mario Wilbourn; Kevin Anderson	Wheezy; Dez Wright; 9jay	3:44
5.	"This Sunday"	Wilburn; Wayne; Andre Proctor	Dre Moon	3:18
6.	"Luv Bad Bitches" (with Brownstone)	Wilburn; Wayne; Richardson; Kobe Hood; Nichole Gilbert; Gordon Chambers; David Hall; Kevin Madison; Erick Sermon	Metro Boomin; Prince85	3:16
7.	"Amazing (Interlude)"	Wilburn; Wayne; Elgin Lumpkin; Timothy Mosley; Lexus Lewis; Radric Davis; Onika Maraj	Metro Boomin	2:24
8.	"All to Myself" (with the Weeknd)	Wilburn; Wayne; Tesfaye; Dean	Metro Boomin; Dean; Tiago	4:14
9.	"Nights Like This"	Wilburn; Wayne; Townsend; Hood; Jordan Houston; Paul Beauregard; Darnell Carlton; Debright Pannell	Metro Boomin; Chris Xz	3:52
10.	"Came to the Party"	Wilburn; Wayne; Glass; Nils Noehden	Metro Boomin; Wheezy; Nils	3:18
11.	"Right 4 You"	Wilburn; Wayne; Babyface (musician); Kenneth Edmonds; Antonio Reid; Daryl Simmons	Metro Boomin	3:56
12.	"Mile High Memories"	Wilburn; Wayne; Joshua Luellen; Richardson; Patrick Grossi; Ariel Rechtshaid	Metro Boomin; Southside	3:39
13.	"Overload"	Wilburn; Wayne; Proctor; Darrel Jackson	Metro Boomin; Dre Moon; Chopsquad DJ	3:44
14.	"Gracious" (with Ty Dolla Sign)	Wilburn; Wayne; Tyrone Griffin, Jr.; Taurus Currie, Jr.	Metro Boomin; Taurus	3:06
15.	"Beat It"	Wilburn; Wayne; Dean; Richardson	Metro Boomin; Dean; Peter Lee Johnson; Tommy Parker	3:38
16.	"Always Be My Fault" (with the Weeknd)	Wilburn; Wayne; Tesfaye; Dean; Allen Ritter; Mejdi Rhars	Metro Boomin; Dean; Ritter; Prince85	4:06
17.	"One Big Family"	Wilburn; Wayne; Rhars; Austin Paoli	Metro Boomin; Prince85; Notinbed	4:05
18.	"Red Leather" (with J. Cole)	Wilburn; Wayne; Jermaine Cole; Proctor	Metro Boomin; Dre Moon; Johnson; Mike McTaggart	6:54

We Still Don't Trust You disc two track listing
No.	Title	Writer(s)	Producer(s)	Length
1.	"#1 (Intro)"	Wilburn; Wayne	Metro Boomin	0:41
2.	"Nobody Knows My Struggle"	Wilburn; Wayne; Luellen	Metro Boomin; Southside	3:25
3.	"All My Life" (with Lil Baby)	Wilburn; Wayne; Dominique Jones	Metro Boomin; Wheezy; Oz; Nik D	3:10
4.	"Crossed Out"	Wilburn; Wayne	Metro Boomin; Dre Blak; Lil88	2:22
5.	"Crazy Clientele"	Wilburn; Wayne	Metro Boomin; Will-A-Fool	3:09
6.	"Show of Hands" (with ASAP Rocky)	Wilburn; Wayne; Rakim Mayers; Curtis Mayfield	Metro Boomin; Honorable C.N.O.T.E.	3:33
7.	"Streets Made Me a King"	Wilburn; Wayne	Metro Boomin; Prince85; Notinbed	3:04
Total length:				88:33

=== Notes ===
- "Drink n Dance" features additional vocals from Chris Brown
- "#1 (Intro)" features an excerpt from Charlamagne tha God and Andrew Schulz

=== Samples ===
- "Right 4 You" features an interpolation of "End of the Road" by Boyz II Men
- "Mile High Memories" contains samples of "Hanging On" by Ellie Goulding
- "This Sunday" features an interpolation of "Feel No Ways" by Drake (Note: "This Sunday" was originally leaked in 2015 and was later interpolated by Drake for the chorus on "Feel No Ways".)
- "All to Myself" features a sample of "Let's Lay Together" by the Isley Brothers
- "Came to the Party" features a sample of "Dancin on a Pole" by Three 6 Mafia featuring Chrome Korleone

== Personnel ==
- Future – vocals
- Metro Boomin – production
- Joe LaPorta – mastering
- Ethan Stevens – mixing

== Charts ==
=== Weekly charts ===
Weekly chart performance for We Still Don't Trust You
Chart (2024)	Peak position
Australian Albums (ARIA)	15
Australian Hip Hop/R&B Albums (ARIA)	3
Austrian Albums (Ö3 Austria)	5
Canadian Albums (Billboard)	2
Danish Albums (Hitlisten)	8
Dutch Albums (Album Top 100)	6
French Albums (SNEP)	12
German Albums (Offizielle Top 100)	9
Hungarian Albums (MAHASZ)	7
Irish Albums (Official Charts)	15
Italian Albums (FIMI)	19
Lithuanian Albums (AGATA)	5
New Zealand Albums (RMNZ)	6
Norwegian Albums (VG-lista)	3
Polish Albums (ZPAV)	27
Portuguese Albums (AFP)	7
Swedish Albums (Sverigetopplistan)	33
Swiss Albums (Schweizer Hitparade)	3
UK Albums (Official Charts)	11
UK R&B Albums (Official Charts)	38
US Billboard 200	1
US Top R&B/Hip-Hop Albums (Billboard)	1

=== Year-end charts ===
Year-end chart performance for We Still Don't Trust You
Chart (2024)	Position
Dutch Albums (Album Top 100)	82
US Billboard 200	108
US Top R&B/Hip-Hop Albums (Billboard)	41

== Release history ==
Release dates and formats for We Still Don't Trust You
Region	Date	Label(s)	Format(s)	Edition	Ref.
Various	April 12, 2024	Wilburn Holding; Epic; Boominati; Republic	Digital download; streaming	Standard	
Various	April 25, 2024	Wilburn Holding; Epic; Boominati; Republic	CD	Standard	
Various	July 31, 2024	Wilburn Holding; Epic; Boominati; Republic	LP	Standard	
