= Bigidagoe =

Dutch rapper (1997–2024)

- Born: Danzel Joel Silos; 10 June 1997; Amsterdam, Netherlands
- Died: 25 February 2024 (aged 26) Amsterdam, Netherlands
- Genres: Drill; Gangsta rap
- Occupation: Rapper
- Years active: 2014–2024

Danzel Joel Silos (10 June 1997 – 25 February 2024), known mononymously as Bigidagoe (Surinamese slang for "big dog"), was a Dutch drill rapper. His rap style was characterized as a Dutch translation of American gangsta rap from the 1980s and 1990s.

== Early life ==
Danzel Joel Silos was born in Amsterdam on 10 June 1997. He attended elementary school in Bijlmermeer.

== Career ==
Bigidagoe's rap career began in 2014, when he released his debut single "Bodem" ("bottom"). A year later he appeared at a Zonamo Underground Spit session accompanying the Amsterdam rapper Sepa. Bigidagoe's breakthrough came in 2018 when he performed in a 101Barz session with the rap formation Zone6, a group labeled as criminal by authorities.

== Feuds and legal issues ==
In addition to his hip hop career, Bigidagoe was frequently associated with crime. His criminal record went back to the age of 12, when he was convicted of a street robbery. Moreover, Bigidagoe liked to show himself with expensive items that, according to the investigative services, were largely financed by the cocaine trade.

On 25 August 2020, Bigidagoe was shot in Amsterdam's Rivierenbuurt neighborhood and was seriously injured, leading to the alleged shooter's place of residence being shot up in retaliation, and then Bigidagoe's mother's house being fired upon. On 4 September 2020, Bigidagoe released the single "Opp Blazen" in response to his shooting, with the music video filmed in a hospital. The video amassed over a million views on YouTube.

In 2021, Bigidagoe was involved in a feud with Amsterdam rapper Chivv, in which gold chains were allegedly stolen on both sides and diss tracks were released. The feud threatened to culminate in an armed conflict, after which the police decided to preventively arrest both rappers. Ultimately, both rappers received a restraining order to de-escalate the feud.

In October 2022, Bigidagoe was arrested on suspicion of kidnapping rival rapper Kobus L. in Duivendrecht. In December 2023, the Public Prosecution Service demanded a four-year prison sentence against Bigidagoe for his possible involvement in the kidnapping.

== Death ==
On 25 February 2024, Silos was shot while leaving a party center in the Westpoort borough of Amsterdam, and was hospitalised but died from his injuries. He was 26 years old. A 20-year-old suspect was arrested three days later at Charles de Gaulle Airport.

== Discography ==
=== Singles ===
- Bodem (2014)
- Holendrecht Anthem (met JoeyAK, Lucc, Bright, JayKoppig and J-Boy) (2018)
- B.I.G (2018)
- Billen & Tieten (2019)
- Zware Jongen (with JoeyAK) (2020)
- Je Vind Niet Erg Toch (with Drechter) (2020)
- 1Serie (2020)
- Ze Willen Ons Niet Goed Zien (2020)
- Opp Blazen (2020)
- Opp Blazen Remix (with KA, Mula B, JoeyAK, Drechter and Mocromaniac) (2020)
- Trappenhal (2021)
- Rosé (with Hekje31) (2021)
- Platzak (with Esko, Jack and Vic9) (2021)
- Urus Sessie (2021)
- Wat Denk Je Dat Ik Zoek (with JoeyAK, Hekje31 and JayKoppig) (2021)
- Voodoo (with JoeyAK, Hekje31, Drechter and JayKoppig) (2021)
- Gangshit (with Henkie T) (2021)
- Sexy Met Belly (with Architrackz) (2022)
- Afblazen (2022)
- Laatste Drip (with Hekje31, JoeyAK, Drechter and JayKoppig) (2022)
- Keuzes (2023)
- Never Meer Broke Zijn (with Drechter) (2023)
- Claimen (with Jonna Fraser) (2023)

== See also ==
- List of murdered hip hop musicians
