= Presto (rapper) =

German rapper (1992–2024)

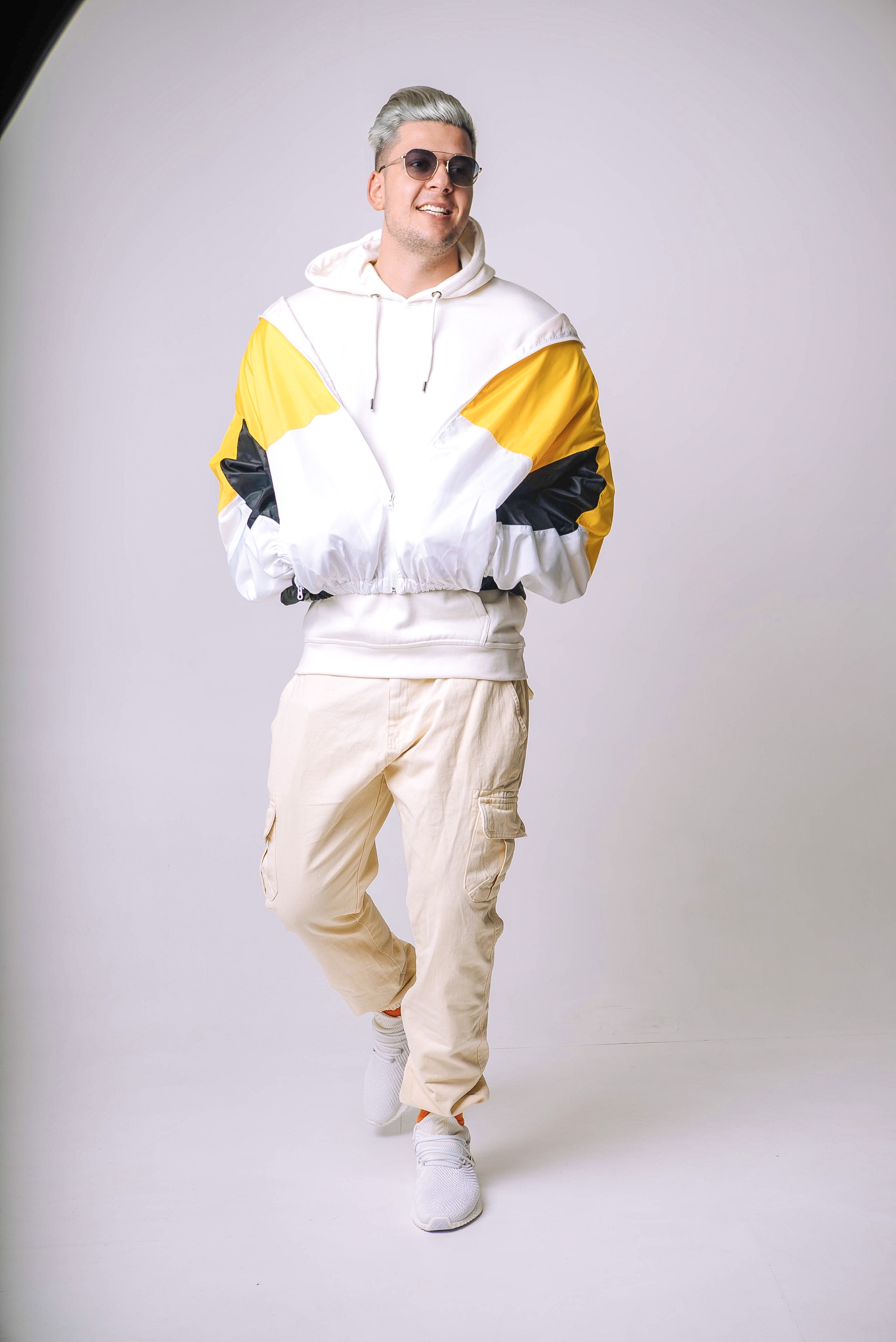
- Presto in 2019

Background information
- Born: Martin Wenzel; 1 October 1992; Oranienburg, Brandenburg, Germany
- Died: 3 March 2024 (aged 31) Berlin, Germany
- Genres: Hip hop
- Occupation: Rapper

Martin Wenzel (1 October 1992 – 3 March 2024), known mononymously as Presto, was a German rapper from Berlin who was best known for his participation in Rap am Mittwoch.

== Early life ==
Martin Wenzel was born on 1 October 1992 in Oranienburg.

== Career ==
At the age of 16, Wenzel tried out as a freestyle rapper in regional hip-hop battles. In 2011 he took part in the battle rap event Rap am Mittwoch for the first time and became the youngest king in Rap am Mittwoch history in the second season. In the years that followed, Presto devoted himself intensively to music and increasingly published free tracks. In 2015, among other things, he reached the quarterfinals of rappers.in's video battle tournament and was also in the final of Universal & Chapter ONE's #Raptags Contest.

On 10 June 2016, Presto released his first EP entitled Gute Deutsche Rap via RecordJet distribution. The songs Jutetaschenswag, Kein Limit and Allrounder were released as singles and released on the HipHop.de and Rap Am Mittwoch.TV platforms. The recordings were produced by Aside and Scaletta. That same year, Presto played live gigs in Berlin, Bamberg and Nuremberg.

The mixtape Endorphine! was released on 18 August 2017 via IgrooveNext. The songs Don't Do These!, Run! (Aubameyang), comet! and Barrio were released as singles. The production comes from Aside, ZMY Da Beat, Sousa and Vecz. Guests on the mixtape included Silla, Julian Williams, Thomas Glenz, S.I.A.D & Stui Crank. Parallel to the production phase of his own mixtape, Presto was active as a songwriter for the Silla album Blockchef for the first time and also contributed a guest contribution to the single Barrio. The Berliner was also often seen as a support act at Silla's live gigs. Towards the end of the year, together with S.I.A.D and Stui Crank, he released the five-track collab EP Gefährlich Ehrlich, which was produced by ZMY Da Beat. Supreme Hoodie was released as the only single.

Presto could be heard as a feature part on the single Bei Dir by Ansen in 2018. In 2020, he released the single Du & Ich together with CJ Stone. In 2023, he appeared as Mart!n.

== Death ==
Wenzel died on the night of 3 March 2024, at the age of 31, having suffered from cancer for almost two years.

== Discography ==
=== Solo albums ===
- 2016: Gute Deutsche Rap (EP)
- 2017: Endorphine! Mixtape (Mixtape)

=== Collaboration albums ===
- 2017: Gefährlich ehrlich (Collaboration EP with S.I.A.D & Stui Crank)

=== Singles ===
==== As lead artist ====
- 2016: Jutebeutelswag (EP Gute Deutsche Rap)
- 2016: Kein Limit (EP Gute Deutsche Rap)
- 2016: Allrounder (EP Gute Deutsche Rap)
- 2017: Mach Doch Nicht Diese! (Mixtape Endorphine!)
- 2017: Lauf! (Aubameyang) (Mixtape Endorphine!)
- 2017: Barrio! (feat. Silla & Julian Williams) (Mixtape Endorphine!)
- 2017: Komet! (Mixtape Endorphine!)
- 2017: Supreme Hoodie (feat. S.I.A.D & Stui Crank) (EP Gefährlich Ehrlich)
- 2020: Du & Ich (with CJ Stone)

==== As featured artist ====
- 2017: Barrio (Silla feat. Julian Williams & Presto)
- 2018: Bei Dir (Ansen feat. Presto)
