= Goodbye Horses (album) =

Mixtape by Ian
- Released: October 18, 2024
- Length: 33:02
- Labels: BuVision; Columbia; Dogdog
- Producers: Aaron Shadrow; Beldon; Berg; Casio5k; Chief Keef; Childboy; Gyo; Ian; Jahnei Clarke; Jasper Harris; Liam McCay; Qioh; Rio Leyva; Solid; Sxprano; Taz Tyler; WondaGurl

Ian chronology
Valedictorian (2024)	Goodbye Horses (2024)	2005 (2025)

Singles from Goodbye Horses
- 1. "Hate Me" Released: July 26, 2024; 2. "End Up Gone" Released: October 4, 2024

Goodbye Horses is the second mixtape by American rapper Ian, released on October 18, 2024, through BuVision and Columbia Records. The album follows Ian's debut mixtape Valedictorian (2024), and includes guest appearances from Chief Keef, Lil Yachty, Eyesis, and Reign.

== Reception ==
Professional ratings
Review scores
Source	Rating
Pitchfork	4.6/10
AllMusic	2/5 stars

HotNewHipHop noted the controversy of the previous release and asked its readers how they felt about the mixtape, including the presence of guest artists Chief Keef and Lil Yachty.

The Needle Drop sharply criticized the mixtape, saying its "core content... sucks." Reviewer Anthony Fantano pointed to "On the Floor" as the only "listenable" song in an mixtape that is "the definition of mid."

== Track listing ==
Goodbye Horses track listing
No.	Title	Writer(s)	Producer(s)	Length
1.	"Showboat"	Ian Smith; Asmil Rodriguez	Ian; Sxprano	2:30
2.	"Till I Die"	Smith; Rodriguez	Sxprano	2:44
3.	"3.5"	Smith; Aaron Shadrow; Bailey Goldberg; Ebony Oshunrinde; Jahnei Clarke; Jasper Harris	Shadrow; Berg; Clarke; Harris; WondaGurl	2:36
4.	"On the Floor"	Smith; Harris; Shadrow	Shadrow; Harris	2:22
5.	"My Call"	Smith; Gyo	Gyo; Sxprano	2:39
6.	"Out West"	Smith; Danny Snodgrass, Jr.; Rio Leyva; Tyler Montero	Rio Leyva; Taz Taylor; Qioh	2:06
7.	"Sh*t Sad" (with Chief Keef)	Smith; Rodriquez; Keith Cozat	Chief Keef; Ian	3:14
8.	"End Up Gone"	Smith; Rodriguez	Sxprano	2:19
9.	"Big Wigs" (featuring Reign)	Smith; Harris	Clarke; Harris	2:22
10.	"Loco"	Smith; Alexander Lattisch; Beldon Jones; Jared Duckworth	Beldon; Casio5k; Solid	2:10
11.	"Hate Me" (with Lil Yachty)	Deshawn Jackson; Miles McCollum	Childboy	2:12
12.	"Off That Sh*t"	Smith; Rodriguez	Sxprano	2:11
13.	"Goodbye Horses" (with Eyesis)	Smith; Rodriguez; Eyesis; Liam McCay	Ian; McCay; Sxprano	3:03
Total length:				33:02

== Personnel ==
Credits adapted from Tidal.

- Ian – vocals (all tracks); engineering, mixing, mastering (tracks 1–10, 12, 13)
- Nicco "Neek" Catalano – mixing, mastering (1–10, 12, 13)
- Lil Yachty – vocals (11)
- Benjamin Mathew – engineering, mixing (11)
- Colin Leonard – mastering (11)

== Personnel ==
These credits have been adapted from Tidal:

- Ian Smith – recording, mixing, mastering (except "Hate Me")
- Nicco "Neek" Catalano – mixing, mastering (except "Hate Me")
- Benjamin Mathew – recording, mixing ("Hate Me")
- Colin Leonard – mastering ("Hate Me")

== Charts ==
Chart performance for Goodbye Horses
Chart (2024)	Peak position
US Billboard 200	86
