= World Wide Whack =

Studio album by Tierra Whack
- Released: March 15, 2024
- Genre: Hip-hop; jazz funk; R&B
- Length: 37:47
- Label: Interscope
- Producer: Mitch Beer; Boy Deco; Hank Byerly; The Composer Seven-Five; Davwave; Brianna Farruggio; J Melodic; Ric & Thadeus; Kenete Simms; Nick Verruto

Tierra Whack chronology
R&B? (2021)	World Wide Whack (2024)	Whack’s Museum (2026)

Singles from World Wide Whack
- 1. "Chanel Pit" Released: November 7, 2023; 2. "Shower Song" Released: January 26, 2024; 3. "27 Club" Released: February 16, 2024

World Wide Whack is the debut studio album by American rapper Tierra Whack, released on March 15, 2024, by Interscope Records. Whack portrays an alter ego in the cover art for the album and its music videos, including in that for the first single "Shower Song". The album received acclaim from critics.

== Background and concept ==
Following on from Whack World (2018), Whack announced the album as her debut full-length project on January 23, 2024. The cover art was "brought to life" by American conceptual artist Alex Da Corte. The announcement called the character as depicted on the cover art "an alter ego both untouchable and vulnerable, superhuman and painfully human, whose surprising story will unfold in images and video over the course of the album's visual rollout" and also listed Pierrot the clown, fashion designer Elsa Schiaparelli, and Donna Summer as the character's inspirations.

== Critical reception ==
Professional ratings
Aggregate scores
Source	Rating
AnyDecentMusic?	7.6/10
Metacritic	84/100
Review scores
Source	Rating
AllMusic	4.5/5 stars
Clash	8/10
NME	4/5 stars
The Skinny	4/5 stars
Slant Magazine	4/5 stars

World Wide Whack received a score of 84 out of 100 on review aggregator Metacritic based on 14 critics' reviews, indicating "universal acclaim". The reviews aggregated on AnyDecentMusic? collectively rated it an 7.6 out of 10, based on 12 critics' scores.

In the review of the album for AllMusic, Heather Phares wrote, "Though World Wide Whack is more polished and direct than any of her previous work, she doesn't straighten out her music too much while she threads the needle between individuality and accessibility. Economy remains one of her greatest strengths, and the sculpted, vivid sounds behind her are as witty and versatile as she is." Peter A. Berry of Variety described it as "a fully realized portrait of Tierra in all her idiosyncratic glory. If her first project was Whack World, this one is Whack Universe. She goes all over the musical map as she oscillates between retro jazz funk, sprightly raps, and quirky everygirl R&B scribbled in crayon". Rolling Stone's Mankaprr Conteh called it "perversely fun, a disorienting merry-go-round of despair and uplift, rather than a linear path to victory or failure".

Reviewing the album for Clash, Lily Blakeney-Edwards felt that it "demonstrates the latest evolution in her sound; poetic, yet blatant emotional honesty" as it "turns Whack's previously established sound up a notch, delving between various genres, lyrical flow, and sonic embellishment throughout its runtime". Jordan Bassett of NME found it to be, "playful and sincere, mature but childlike, featherlight and occasionally heavy". Slant Magazine's Thomas Bedenbaugh stated that the album "exudes a newfound confidence and braggadocio throughout", concluding that while it "may be a candid and sophisticated analysis of the dark side of fame" it is "also eminently entertaining and occasionally funny".

Chris Sneddon of The Skinny remarked that "perhaps this new album doesn't match the immediate wow factor of Whack World – few albums ever could – but regardless, we should be thankful Tierra Whack is out there doing her thing; making mainstream hip-hop interesting." For The Line of Best Fit, Noah Barker stated that "Each track will commit to Whack's usual first minute, but suspiciously lingers on, sometimes embellishing an idea and other times letting the same moment marinate on repeat. This often does little to diminish the power of each particular song, but on the macro-level, the record is still a collection of fleeting snapshots, albeit with high resolution and long-term fidelity." Concluding the review for HipHopDX, Alec Siegel declared that, "During a time of algorithm-induced sameness, Whack pushes herself and her collaborators to find fresh concepts, flows and sounds. She reflects the human experience in tidy, Technicolor parcels. Whether staring down a neverending well of despair or overconfidently singing in the shower, WWW shines brightest when Whack brings her otherworldly talent to relatable everyday struggles."

== Track listing ==
World Wide Whack track listing
No.	Title	Writer(s)	Producer(s)	Length
1.	"Mood Swing"	Tierra Whack; Jesse Mapson III; Kenete Simms	J Melodic; Simms	1:12
2.	"Ms Behave"	Whack; Ernest Hogan	The Composer Seven-Five	2:29
3.	"Chanel Pit"	Whack; John Verruto	Nick Verruto	2:48
4.	"Numb"	Whack; Mapson	J Melodic	1:40
5.	"Burning Brains"	Whack; Mitch Beer; Hank Byerly; Brianna Farruggio	Beer; Byerly; Farruggio	1:55
6.	"Accessible"	Whack; Mapson; Simms	J Melodic; Simms	2:47
7.	"Imaginary Friends"	Whack; Joseph Briggs; Farruggio	Boy Deco; Farruggio	2:40
8.	"X"	Whack; Nadav Chatinover; Casey Millan; Quentin Shemwell	Davwave; Ric & Thadeus	2:25
9.	"Moovies"	Whack; Millan; Shemwell	Ric & Thadeus	2:55
10.	"Difficult"	Whack; Beery; Byerly; Mapson	Beer; Byerly; J Melodic	2:56
11.	"Shower Song"	Whack; Mapson	J Melodic	2:43
12.	"Invitation"	Whack; Farruggio; Simms	Farruggio; Simms	2:39
13.	"Snake Eyes"	Whack; Mapson	J Melodic	2:38
14.	"Two Night"	Whack; J. Verruto	N. Verruto	3:27
15.	"27 Club"	Whack; Farruggio; Mapson	Farruggio; J Melodic	2:33
Total length:				37:47

== Personnel ==
- Tierra Whack – vocals
- Zach Pereyra – mastering, mixing assistance
- Manny Marroquin – mixing
- Kenete Simms – engineering (tracks 1–3, 5–10, 12–15)
- Hank Byerly – engineering (tracks 4, 8, 10, 11)
- Anthony Vilchis – mixing assistance
- Trey Station – mixing assistance
