= Red Leather (song) =

Song by Future, Metro Boomin and J. Cole

from the album We Still Don't Trust You
- Released: April 12, 2024
- Genre: West Coast hip-hop
- Length: 6:54
- Label: Wilburn Holding; Boominati; Epic; Republic
- Songwriters: Nayvadius Wilburn; Leland Wayne; Jermaine Cole
- Producer: Metro Boomin

"Red Leather" is a song by American rapper Future and American record producer Metro Boomin with fellow American rapper J. Cole. It was released through Freebandz (under the business name Wilburn Holding Co), Boominati Worldwide, Epic Records, and Republic as the eighteenth and last track of the first disk of the former two's collaborative studio album, We Still Don't Trust You, on April 12, 2024.

== Background ==
The song was first revealed via the album's tracklist just hours prior to its release.

== Critical reception ==
Michael Saponara of Billboard ranked "Red Leather" as the fifth best song on We Still Don't Trust You. Saponara described the track as "seven minutes of smooth raps".

Writing for Clash, Robin Murray wrote that the track is "one of the best" on the album and that the track has a "breezy West Coast feel" accompanied by "Cole’s introspection offering something distinctive". Sputnikmusic's Dakota West Foss compared the beat to NyQuil, suggesting that it's boring and stated that Cole's verse matches the beat. He also states that "Future completely drops the ball" on the track.

== Charts ==
Chart performance for "Red Leather"
Chart (2024)	Peak position
Canada Hot 100 (Billboard)	58
Global 200 (Billboard)	97
New Zealand Hot Singles (RMNZ)	9
US Billboard Hot 100	39
US Hot R&B/Hip-Hop Songs (Billboard)	16
