= Valedictorian (mixtape) =

Mixtape by Ian
- Released: May 17, 2024
- Length: 19:14
- Labels: BuVision; Columbia; Dogdog
- Producers: Desmos; Sxprano; tana; Taz Taylor; Rio Leyva; Qioh

Ian chronology
Valedictorian (2024)	Goodbye Horses (2024)

Singles from Valedictorian
- 1. "Figure It Out" Released: February 14, 2024; 2. "Grand Slam" Released: March 28, 2024

Valedictorian is the debut mixtape by American rapper Ian. It was released on May 17, 2024, by BuVision Entertainment, Columbia Records, and Dogdog Records. The mixtape includes production from Sxprano, rapper tana, and more. The deluxe edition was released two weeks later on May 31, 2024.

== Background ==
His debut mixtape, Ian invited his grandmother and mother to announce the release.

== Reception ==
Professional ratings
Review scores
Source	Rating
AllMusic	1.5/5 stars
Pitchfork	4.1/10

The mixtape received negative reviews from critics. The mixtape received a 4.1/10 from Alphonse Pierre of Pitchfork, with him saying: "That said, none of Valedictorian is unlistenable—just devoid of any personality or imagination. Performing an amalgamation of melodic regional rap of the last decade or so, ian lacks the ability or intention to do anything other than replicate music that already exists".

Zachary Horvath of HotNewHipHop wrote: "He knows how to create straight bangers with some hilariously blunt similes".

== Track listing ==
All tracks are written by Ian O'Neill Smith and Asmil Rodriguez, additional writers are listed below.

Valedictorian track listing
No.	Title	Writer(s)	Producer(s)	Length
1.	"Holiday Intro" (featuring DJ Holiday)	Ian Smith; Robert Avery; Asmil Rodriguez; Dallas Sessoms	Sxprano	0:38
2.	"Never Stop"			2:07
3.	"Bentayga"			2:03
4.	"AirBnb"			2:13
5.	"Hermes Sheets"			2:24
6.	"Omakase"			2:02
7.	"Chauncey"	Stephen Lewis II	tana	1:51
8.	"Judgment"			2:13
9.	"Grand Slam"			1:59
10.	"Figure It Out"			1:34
Total length:				19:14

Deluxe edition bonus tracks
No.	Title	Writer(s)	Producer(s)	Length
2.	"Magic Johnson"	Rio Leyva; Danny Snodgrass Jr.; Tyler Montero; Herbert Waters	Leyva; Taz Taylor; Qioh; Desmos	2:17
12.	"Options"			2:21
Total length:				23:47

== Personnel ==
- Ian – vocals, writing, and primary artist
- Sxprano – production (all except track 7)
- Tana - production (7)

== Charts ==
Chart performance for Valedictorian
Chart (2024)	Peak position
US Billboard 200	54
