= Yuna discography =

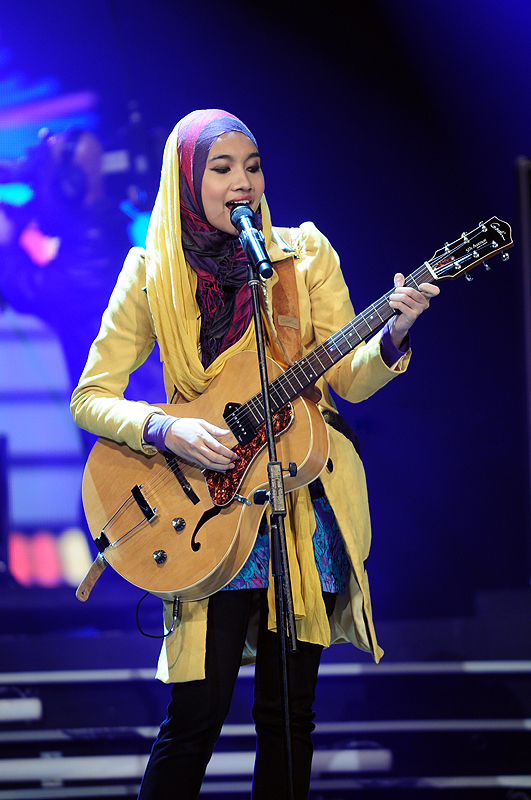
- Yuna performing in 2010.
- Studio albums: 4
- EPs: 6
- Live albums: 2
- Singles: 32
- Music videos: 43
- Remix albums: 1
- Promotional singles: 1

The discography of Malaysian singer-songwriter Yuna consists of four international studio albums, three Malaysian albums, six EPs, 32 international single releases, and 43 music videos.

Yuna was eventually discovered in the US by the Indie-Pop record label and management company. They flew out to Malaysia to convince her to sign with them and then proceeded to get her a deal with Fader Label in February 2011. In the US, she released her first EP, Decorate, in March of the same year. On 24 April 2012, Yuna released her self-titled international debut album, Yuna, which peaked at number 19 on Billboard's Heatseekers Albums charts in the US. The lead single, "Live Your Life", produced by Grammy Award-winning artist Pharrell Williams, reached number 37 on Billboard's Heatseekers Songs charts. Her second international album, Nocturnal, was released in October 2013, preceded by the lead single, "Rescue".

In May 2016, her third album, Chapters, was released, featuring guest appearances from Usher and Jhené Aiko. Her breakout single from the album, "Crush" featuring Usher, peaked at number 3 on Billboard's Adult R&B charts in the US. As of December 2016, Chapters had been selected by Billboard in 7th place of its 2016 Critics' Picks for Best R&B Album, and was subsequently nominated in the Top 20 Best R&B Albums of 2016 by the Rolling Stone magazine. Yuna's latest album, Rouge, was released in July 2019. She has also contributed to several soundtrack albums throughout her career.

== Albums ==
=== Studio albums ===
==== International releases ====
List of international studio albums, showing details and selected chart positions
Title	Album details	Peak chart positions					Sales
Title	Album details	US R&B/HH	US R&B	US Heat	DEN	BRA	Sales
Yuna	Released: 24 April 2012; Label: Fader Label; Format: CD, LP, digital download	—	—	19	32	87	
Nocturnal	Released: 29 October 2013; Label: Verve; Format: CD, LP, digital download	—	—	27	—	—	
Chapters	Released: 20 May 2016; Label: Verve; Format: CD, LP, digital download	16	8	5	—	—	
Rouge	Released: 12 July 2019; Label: Verve Forecast, UMG; Format: CD, LP, digital download	—	—	18	—	—	
Y5	Released: 11 November 2022; Label: Independent Co., Yuna Room Records; Format: CD, LP, digital download	—	—	—	—	—	

==== Malaysian releases ====
List of Malaysian studio albums, showing details and track listing
Title	Album details	Track listing
Decorate	Released: 23 July 2010 (MY); Label: Yuna Room; Format: CD, digital download	List: 1. "Gadis Semasa"; 2. "These Streets"; 3. "Penakut"; 4. "Fireworks"; 5. "Rocket"; 6. "Random Awesome"; 7. "Permission"; 8. "Cinta Sempurna"; 9. "Decorate"; 10. "Super Something"; 11. "Dan Sebenarnya" (Hidden track)
Terukir Di Bintang	Released: 7 January 2012 (MY); Label: Yuna Room; Distributor: FMC Music; Format: CD, digital download	List: 1. "Sparkle"; 2. "Photo of You"; 3. "Memo"; 4. "KL Kita" (featuring Qi Razali); 5. "Terukir Di Bintang"; 6. "Coffee"; 7. "Someone Out of Town"; 8. "Fears and Frustrations"
Material	Released: 5 May 2015 (MY); Label: Yuna Room; Distributor: FMC Music; Format: CD, digital download	List: 1. "Material"; 2. "Lautan"; 3. "Bicara"; 4. "Sayang"; 5. "Langit"; 6. "Lelaki"; 7. "Dan Sebenarnya"
Senjata	Released: 13 November 2015 (MY); Label: Yuna Room; Format: Digital download, streaming	List: 1. "Lena"; 2. "Senjata"; 3. "Turn Back Time"; 4. "Tinggi Rendah Langit"; 5. "Intuisi"; 6. "Rockstar"; 7. "Siren"

=== Live albums ===
List of live albums, showing title, date released, labels and track listing
Title	Album details	Track listing
Live at Istana Budaya	Released: 10 December 2014 (MY); Label: Yuna Room; Distributor: Fantansia Music City; Format: CD, DVD	List: 1. "Decorate"; 2. "Favourite Thing"; 3. "Coffee"; 4. "Gelora Jiwa"; 5. "Dan Sebenarnya"; 6. "Terfikir Di Bintang"; 7. "Remember My Name"; 8. "Deeper Conversation"; 9. "Musician"; 10. "I Wanna Go"; 11. "Fears and Frustrations"; 12. "Young"; 13. "Lullabies"; 14. "Penakut"; 15. "Lelaki"
Spotify Sessions (Live From Spotify Singapore)	Released: 2014; Label: Verve; Format: Streaming	List: 1. "Mountains"; 2. "Falling"; 3. "I Want You Back"; 4. "Rescue"; 5. "Hold On, We're Going Home" (Drake Cover)

=== Remix albums ===
List of remix albums, showing title, date released, labels and track listing
Title	Album details	Track listing
Lullabies (Single & Remixes)	Released: 6 May 2014; Label: Fader Label; Format: Digital download	List: 1. "Lullabies"; 2. "Lullabies" (Adventure Club Remix); 3. "Lullabies" (Jim-E Stack Remix)

== Extended plays ==
List of extended plays, showing title, date released, labels and track listing
Title	Details	Track listing
Demo	Released: 7 March 2008 (MY); Label: Yuna Room; Format: CD	List: 1. "Deeper Conversation"; 2. "Cinta Sempurna"; 3. "Greek Goddess"; 4. "Fix It"; 5. "Backpacking Around Europe"; 6. "Dan Sebenarnya" (Live at Chenta Kasorga)
Yuna	Released: 12 October 2008 (MY); Label: Yuna Room; Format: CD, digital download	List: 1. "Backpacking Around Europe"; 2. "After Midnight"; 3. "Dan Sebenarnya"; 4. "Blue Sands"; 5. "Deeper Conversation"
Decorate	Released: 15 March 2011 (US); Label: Fader Label; Format: CD, digital download	List: 1. "Decorate"; 2. "Deeper Conversation"; 3. "Someone Out of Town"; 4. "Coffee"; 5. "Fears and Frustrations"
Sixth Street	Released: 7 May 2013 (US); Label: Verve; Format: CD, digital download	List: 1. "I Wanna Go"; 2. "Right Again"; 3. "Let Love Come Through"(featuring Kyle); 4. "Young"; 5. "Musician"
Y1	Released: 11 March 2022 (US); Label: Independent Co., Yuna Room Records; Format: Digital download	List: 1. "Intro"; 2. "Hello"; 3. "Pantone 17 13 30"; 4. "Cigarette"
Y2	Released: 6 May 2022 (US); Label: Independent Co., Yuna Room Records; Format: Digital download	List: 1. "Girl U Used 2 Know"; 2. "24 Hours"; 3. "Make A Move"
Y3	Released: 8 July 2022 (US); Label: Independent Co., Yuna Room Records; Format: Digital download	List: 1. "Don't Wanna Know"; 2. "Risk It All"; 3. "Summer Love"
Y4	Released: 2 September 2022 (US); Label: Independent Co., Yuna Room Records; Format: Digital download	List: 1. "Make Believe"; 2. "Fool 4 U"; 3. "Relax Your Mind"
Masih Yuna	Released: 27 April 2023 (US); Label: Independent Co., Yuna Room Records; Format: Digital download	List: 1. "Menanti"; 2. "Masih Sunyi"; 3. "Asing"; 4. "Camaraderie"
Battle	Released: 14 November 2023 (US); Label: Independent Co., Yuna Room Records; Format: Digital download	List: 1. "Glory"; 2. "Bad Intentions"; 3. "Cyanide"; 4. "Battle"
Wasting Away	Released: 29 November 2024 (US); Label: Independent Co., Yuna Room Records; Format: Digital download	List: 1. "Out of my Mind"; 2. "The Party"; 3. "Easy"; 4. "Be Someone"
The Valour Hour	Released: 24 April 2026 (US); Label: Independent Co., Yuna Room Records; Format: Digital download	List: 1. "If You Don't Love Me"; 2. "Believer"; 3. "Sky Is Red"; 4. "Wasteland"; 5. "Ready to Move"

== Singles ==
=== As lead artist ===
List of singles as lead artist, with selected chart positions, showing year released and album name
Title	Year	Peak chart positions							Certifications	Album
Title	Year	US Heat	US R&B	US Adult R&B	US R&B/HH Airplay	DEN	KOR	MY	Certifications	Album
"Come as You Are"	2011	—	—	—	—	—	—	—		Decorate
"Someone Out of Town"	2011	—	—	—	—	—	—	—		Decorate
"Live Your Life"	2012	37	—	—	—	—	—	—		Yuna
"Lullabies"	2012	—	—	—	—	17	—	—		Yuna
"Shine Your Way" (with Owl City)	2013	—	—	—	—	—	93	—		The Croods
"I Wanna Go"	2013	—	—	—	—	—	—	—		Sixth Street and Nocturnal
"Rescue"	2013	—	—	—	—	—	—	—		Nocturnal
"Mountains"	2013	—	—	—	—	—	—	—		Nocturnal
"Falling"	2014	—	—	—	—	—	—	—		Nocturnal
"Come Back"	2014	—	—	—	—	—	—	—		Nocturnal
"Broke Her"	2014	—	—	—	—	—	—	—		Non-album single
"Lights and Camera" (featuring G-Eazy)	2014	—	—	—	—	—	—	—		Nocturnal
"Crush" (featuring Usher)	2016	3	21	3	22	—	—	1	RIAA: Gold	Chapters
"Lanes"	2016	—	—	—	—	—	—	—		Chapters
"Mannequin"	2016	—	—	—	—	—	—	—		Chapters
"Poor Heat"	2016	—	—	—	—	—	—	—		Chapters
"Best Love"	2017	—	—	2	19	—	—	—		Chapters
"Unrequited Love"	2017	—	—	—	—	—	—	—		Chapters
"Better Now"	2018	—	—	—	—	—	—	—		Non-album single
"Forevermore"	2019	—	—	—	—	—	—	1		Rouge
"Blank Marquee" (with G-Eazy)	2019	—	—	17	—	—	—	12		Rouge
"Pink Youth" (with Little Simz)	2019	—	—	—	—	—	—	—		Rouge
"(Not) The Love of My Life"	2019	—	—	—	—	—	—	—		Rouge
"Castaway" (with Tyler, the Creator)	2019	—	—	—	—	—	—	—		Rouge
"Teenage Heartbreak" (original with Miyavi or remix with Miyavi featuring MadeinTYO)	2019	—	—	—	—	—	—	—		Rouge
"Creep"	2019	—	—	—	—	—	—	—		Non-album singles
"Stay Where You Are"	2020	—	—	—	—	—	—	—		Non-album singles
"Invisible"	2020	—	—	—	—	—	—	—		Non-album singles
"Dance Like Nobody's Watching" (solo or remix with James Reid)	2020	—	—	—	—	—	—	—		Non-album singles
"Don't Blame It on Love" (featuring Pink Sweat$)	2021	—	—	—	—	—	—	—		Non-album singles
"Pantone 17 13 30"	2022	—	—	—	—	—	—	—		Y1 and Y5
"Make a Move"	2022	—	—	—	—	—	—	—		Y2 and Y5
"Risk It All"	2022	—	—	—	—	—	—	—		Y3 and Y5
"Fool 4 U"	2022	—	—	—	—	—	—	—		Y4 and Y5
"Can't Get Over You"	2022	—	—	—	—	—	—	—		Y5
"Menanti"	2023	—	—	—	—	—	—	—		Masih Yuna
"Glory"	2023	—	—	—	—	—	—	—		Battle
"Bad Intentions"	2023	—	—	—	—	—	—	—		Battle
"Watak Utama" (featuring Bunga Citra Lestari)	2024	—	—	—	—	—	—	—		Non-album single
"Be Someone"	2024	—	—	—	—	—	—	—		Wasting Away
"The Party"	2024	—	—	—	—	—	—	—		Wasting Away
"Hilang Dari Raya Ku"	2025	—	—	—	—	—	—	—		Non-album single
"If You Don't Love Me"	2025	—	—	—	—	—	—	—		The Valour Hour
"Believer"	2026	—	—	—	—	—	—	—		The Valour Hour
"Wasteland"	2026	—	—	—	—	—	—	—		The Valour Hour
"—" denotes a recording that did not chart or was not released in that territory.

=== As featured artist ===
List of singles as featured artist, showing year released and album name
Title	Year	Peak chart positions		Album
Title	Year	US	US Dance	Album
"In My Dreams" (Lincoln Jesser featuring Yuna)	2013	—	—	In My Dreams
"Baby Boy" (Lincoln Jesser featuring Yuna)	2016	—	—	Non-album single
"Modern Flame" (Emmit Fenn featuring Yuna)	2017	—	—	Prologue
"Empty Room" (Big Wild featuring Yuna)	2017	—	—	Invincible
"Don't Call Me" (TOKiMONSTA featuring Yuna)	2017	— (Note: "Don't Call Me" did not enter the Billboard Hot 100 Chart, but has been selected at number 47 on the Billboard's 50 Best Dance/Electronic Songs of 2017: Critics' Picks.)	—	Lune Rouge
"Leaving" (Ekali featuring Yuna)	2018	—	—	Crystal Eyes
"Next To You" (Ben L'Oncle Soul featuring Yuna)	2020	—	—	Addicted To You
"Rebellious" (Adventure Club featuring Yuna)	2020	—	—	Love // Chaos
"Break Down the Wall" (Kleerup featuring Yuna)	2020	—	—	Non-album singles
"Angry Hearts (Charlie Heat featuring Yuna)	2021	—	—	VALENTINE'S SON
"Sky Is Crying" (ZHU featuring Yuna)	2021	—	39	Dreamland 2021
"Reminisce" (Manila Killa featuring Yuna)	2021	—	—	semilucent 2
"So Right" (SHAUN featuring Yuna)	2022	—	—	Non-album single
"You Can Be My Guide" (Tachys featuring Yuna)	2022	—	—	Tachys
"Real Love Still Exists" (HENRY featuring Yuna)	2023	—	—	Non-album single
"After The End" (Clear Eyes featuring Yuna)	2023	—	—	Particles
"I'll Show You" (Chicocurlyhead featuring Yuna)	2024	—	—	Non-album single
"—" denotes a recording that did not chart or was not released.

=== Promotional singles ===
Title	Year	Album
"Places to Go"	2016	Chapters

== Guest appearances ==
List of non-single guest appearances, with other performing artists, showing year released and album name
Title	Year	Other artist(s)	Album
"Here Comes the Sun"	2012	—N/a	Savages
"Sunset"	2013	The Internet	Feel Good
"Gold"	2013	Adventure Club	Calling All Heroes
"Lights and Camera"	2014	—N/a	Beyond the Lights
"All 4 You"	2015	Kyle	Smyle
"A Whole New World" (From Aladdin)	2015	—N/a	We Love Disney
"On Ghost Ridge"	2016	Nicholas Pike	100 Years: One Woman's Fight for Justice
"Lovesong"	2016	—N/a	The Time Is Now!
"Flags"	2017	Shoffy	Shoffy
"Me and the Moonlight"	2018	MIYAVI	Samurai Sessions, Vol. 3 - Worlds Collide
"No Different"	2019	Epik High	Sleepless in
"Talk About It"	2021	Jake Isaac	Honesty

== Music videos ==
List of music videos as lead and featured artist, showing year released and directors
Title	Year	Director(s)	Ref.
As lead artist
"Raya Oh Yeah"	2010	Zul Luey	
"Decorate"	2011	Unknown	
"Gadis Semasa"	2011	Ahmad Faris, Zul Luey	
"Come As You Are"	2011	Unknown	
"Memo"	2011	Zul Luey	
"Someone Out of Town"	2011	Unknown	
"Live Your Life"	2012	Matt Baron	
"Sparkle"	2012	Quek Shio Chuan	
"Terukir Di Bintang"	2012	Zul Luey	
"KL Kita" (featuring Qi Razali)	2012	Kroll Azry	
"Walking Like a Dream"	2012	Unknown	
"Live Your Life" (Twinsmatic Remix)	2013	Fourclops (Eli Steinberg & Jeff Greco)	
"Home"	2013	Unknown	
"Shine Your Way" (with Owl City)	2013	Unknown	
"I Wanna Go"	2013	Didi Ramlan, Julian Schratter	
"Rescue"	2013	Elliott Sellers	
"Falling"	2014	Zul Luey	
"Falling" (US Version)	2014	Zul Luey	
"Come Back"	2014	Adam Patch	
"Broke Her"	2014	Samuel O'Melia	
"Langit"	2014	Unknown	
"Places to Go"	2016	Zev Schmitz, Calvin Callaway	
"Crush" (featuring Usher)	2016	Daniel Carberry	
"Lanes"	2016	Brian Oh	
"Mannequin"	2016	Brian Oh	
"Pulang" (featuring SonaOne)	2016	Adam Sinclair	
"Best Love" (360° Video)	2016	Celia Rowlson-Hall	
"Poor Heart"	2017	RJ Sanchez	
"Unrequited Love"	2017	RJ Sanchez	
"Forevermore"	2019	Adam Sinclair	
"Blank Marquee" (featuring G-Eazy)	2019	Adam Sinclair	
"Pink Youth" (with Little Simz)	2019	Esteban Valdez	
"(Not) The Love Of My Life"	2019	Yuna	
"Castaway" (featuring Tyler, The Creator)	2019	Adam Sinclair	
"Stay Where You Are"	2020	Adam Sinclair	
"Pantone 17 13 30"	2022	Adam Sinclair	
"Hello"	2022	Adam Sinclair	
"Cigarette"	2022	Adam Sinclair	
"Make A Move"	2022	Adam Sinclair	
"Risk It All"	2022	Adam Sinclair, Yuna	
"Can't Get Over You"	2022	Adam Sinclair	
As featured artist
"In My Dreams" (Lincoln Jesser featuring Yuna)	2013	Aris Jerome	
"Dwihati" (Aizat Amdan featuring Yuna)	2013	Syahir Ismail, Ili Amdan	
"Don't Call Me" (TOKiMONSTA featuring Yuna)	2017	Austin Saya	
"Reminisce" (Manila Killa featuring Yuna)	2021	Adam Sinclair	
"So Right" (SHAUN featuring Yuna)	2022	Adrian Per	

== Other songs ==
- "Cartoon Couple"
- "I'm Not Like You"
- "Hero"
- "Missing Star"
- "Lie to Me With Style"
- "This Is Ours"
- "Peer Pressure"
- "Walking Like a Dream"
- "Mermaid"
- "Follow Me Follow Love"
- "Home"
- "Hold On, We're Going Home"

=== Cover songs ===
- Peterpan - "Ku Katakan Dengan Indah"
- Tan Sri P. Ramlee & Asiah Tuah - "Gelora Jiwa"
- Rokiah Wanda - "Bulan Ditutup Awan"
- Oh Chentaku - "Polaroid"
- Kanye West - "Paranoid"
- Taking Back Sunday - "New Again"
- Nirvana - "Come As You Are"
- The Beatles - "Here Comes the Sun"
- Incubus - "I Miss You"
- Frank Ocean - "Thinkin Bout You"
- M. Nasir - "Keroncong Untuk Ana"
- Foals - "Spanish Sahara"
- Brad Kane and Lea Salonga - "A Whole New World"
- Drake - "Hotline Bling"
- Justin Bieber - "What Do You Mean"
- The Cure - "Lovesong"
- Francoise Hardy - "Le Premier Bonheur Du Jour"
- Post Malone - "Better Now"

=== Malay songs ===
- "Cinta Sempurna"
- "Dan Sebenarnya"
- "Gadis Semasa"
- "Penakut"
- "Raya Oh Yeah"
- "KL Kita" (featuring Qi Razali)
- "Terukir Di Bintang"
- "Lelaki"
- "Lautan"
- "Dwihati" (with Aizat Amdan)
- "Pulang" (featuring SonaOne)
