= List of awards and nominations received by Yuna =

Yuna awards and nominations
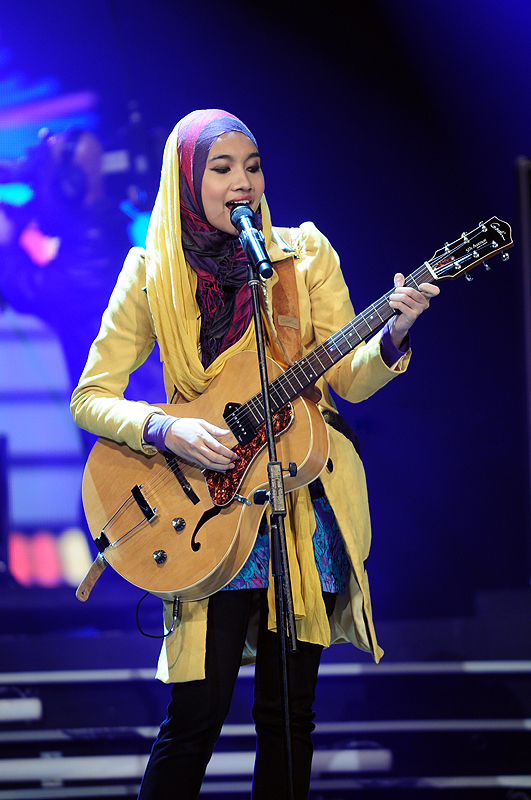
- Yuna performing in 2008.
Awards and nominations
| Award | Wins | Nominations |
| Anugerah Industri Muzik | 11 | 25 |
| Anugerah Planet Muzik | 1 | 18 |
| Anugerah Juara Lagu | 2 | 6 |
| Anugerah Bintang Popular Berita Harian | 3 | 7 |

Totals (Note: Certain award groups do not simply award one winner. They acknowledge several different recipients, have runners-up, and have third place. Since this is a specific recognition and is different from losing an award, runner-up mentions are considered wins in this award tally. For simplification and to avoid errors, each award in this list has been presumed to have had a prior nomination.)
- Wins: 32
- Nominations: 113

This is a list of awards and nominations received by Malaysian singer Yuna.

== Malaysian Awards ==
=== Malaysian Book of Records ===
| Year | Category | Nominated work | Result |
|---|---|---|---|
| 2016 | 1st Singer Listed in The US Billboard Top 10 R&B Chart | Yuna | Won |

=== Malaysian Film Festival ===
| Year | Category | Nominated work | Result |
|---|---|---|---|
| 2015 | Best Original Film Song | Lautan | Won |

=== Malaysian Music Awards ===
Malaysian Music Awards (Anugerah Industri Muzik) is an annual event similar to Grammy Awards which recognises Malaysia's finest artists. Yuna has received 11 awards (including the special Kembara Award in 2011 and 2016).

The year indicates the ceremony year, awarding the previous year's works.

| Bout | Year | Nominated work | Award | Result | Ref |
|---|---|---|---|---|---|
| 17th | 2010 | Yuna | New Artist of the Year | Won | |
| 17th | 2010 | Dan Sebenarnya | Best Pop Song | Won | |
| 17th | 2010 | Dan Sebenarnya | Best Song (Song of the Year) | Won | |
| 17th | 2010 | Dan Sebenarnya | Best Vocal Performance in a Song (Female) | Nominated | |
| 17th | 2010 | Deeper Conversation | Best Local English Song | Won | |
| 18th | 2011 | Decorate | Best Album Cover | Nominated | |
| 18th | 2011 | Penakut | Best Pop Song | Nominated | |
| 18th | 2011 | Penakut | Best Vocal Performance in a Song (Female) | Won | |
| 18th | 2011 | Gelora Jiwa | Best Vocal Performance in a Song (Female) | Nominated | |
| 18th | 2011 | Yuna | Kembara Award | Won | |
| 19th | 2012 | Terukir di Bintang | Best Pop Song | Nominated | |
| 19th | 2012 | Memo | Best Local English Song | Nominated | |
| 19th | 2012 | Photo of You | Best Local English Song | Nominated | |
| 19th | 2012 | Terukir di Bintang | Best Album Cover | Nominated | |
| 19th | 2012 | Terukir di Bintang | Best Musical Arrangement in a Song | Nominated | |
| 19th | 2012 | Sparkle | Best Music Video | Won | |
| 20th | 2013 | You're So Fine (with Guba) | Best Duo / Collaboration Vocal Performance in a Song | Nominated | |
| 20th | 2013 | You're So Fine (with Guba) | Best Local English Song | Nominated | |
| 20th | 2013 | Lelaki | Best Pop Song | Won | |
| 20th | 2013 | Lelaki | Best Song (Song of the Year) | Won | |
| 20th | 2013 | Dwihati (with Aizat Amdan) | Best Music Video | Nominated | |
| 21st | 2014 | Falling | Best Music Video | Won | |
| 22nd | 2016 | Yuna | Kembara Award | Won | |
| 22nd | 2016 | "Material" | Best Album Cover | Nominated | |
| 22nd | 2016 | "Material" | Best Album Recording | Nominated | |

=== Anugerah Planet Muzik ===
Anugerah Planet Muzik (APM) (English: The Music Planet Awards), is an annual event held by three countries – Indonesia, Malaysia and Singapore. Each year, one of the three countries hosts the event where all artists from the three participating countries gather to compete in two main categories – Best Achievement (judged by professional judges from all three countries) and Most Popular (voted by voters from all participating countries through Short Message Service (SMS) and forms in magazines). Yuna has received 19 nominations and one special recognition.

| Bout | Year | Nominated work | Award | Result | Ref |
|---|---|---|---|---|---|
| 9th | 2009 | Dan Sebenarnya | Best Vocal Performance in a Song (New Female Artiste) | Nominated | |
| 9th | 2009 | Yuna | Most Popular Malaysian Artiste | Nominated | |
| 10th | 2011 | Yuna | Most Popular Regional Artiste | Nominated | |
| 11th | 2012 | Yuna | Best Female Artiste | Nominated | |
| 11th | 2012 | Terukir Di Bintang | Best Song | Nominated | |
| 11th | 2012 | Yuna | Most Popular Regional Artiste | Nominated | |
| 11th | 2012 | Yuna | New Media Icon | Nominated | |
| 12th | 2013 | Terukir Di Bintang | Most Popular Regional Song | Nominated | |
| 12th | 2013 | Yuna | Most Popular Regional Artiste | Nominated | |
| 13th | 2014 | Yuna | APM Most Popular Artiste | Nominated | |
| 13th | 2014 | Dwihati (with Aizat Amdan) | Best Duo / Group | Nominated | |
| 14th | 2015 | Yuna | Regional Most Popular Artiste | Nominated | |
| 14th | 2015 | Yuna | Social Media Icon | Nominated | |
| 14th | 2015 | Lautan | Most Popular Song | Nominated | |
| 15th | 2016 | "Material" | Best Female Artiste | Nominated | |
| 15th | 2016 | Yuna | APM Most Popular Artiste | Nominated | |
| 15th | 2016 | Yuna | Social Media Icon | Nominated | |
| 15th | 2016 | Yuna | Rentas Planet Award (International Breakthru Award) | Won | |
| 16th | 2017 | Pulang (with SonaOne) | Best Duo/Group | Nominated | |
| 16th | 2017 | | Social Media Icon | Nominated | |

=== Anugerah Juara Lagu ===
Anugerah Juara Lagu (AJL) (English: the Champion Song Awards), is a yearly event which recognises the musical composition of a song based on the collaborations of three parties – the lyricist, the composers, and the artist. Its weekly programme will gather singles and song nominations from various artistes where they will compete until their songs are shortlisted as finalists before ultimately being nominated to be judged by professional judges. From 1986 until 1991, finalists were chosen based on monthly winners, and from 1992 until 2008, songs were separated into three main categories – Ballad, Irama Malaysia and Ethnic Creative Song and also Pop Rock. However, from 2009 onwards, the award show was revamped and all 12 finalists were made to compete against each other regardless of category. Throughout Yuna's five years of participating, six of her songs had qualified for nomination in the show. In 2012, she won the award show's highest title, the Champion of Champions with Terukir di Bintang, her seventh Malay language song.

| Bout | Year | Nominated work | Award | Result | Ref |
|---|---|---|---|---|---|
| 24th | 2009 | Dan Sebenarnya | 1st Runner-Up | Won | |
| 25th | 2010 | Cinta Sempurna | Finalist | Nominated | |
| 26th | 2011 | Gadis Semasa | Finalist | Nominated | |
| 26th | 2011 | Penakut | Finalist | Nominated | |
| 27th | 2012 | Terukir di Bintang | Winner | Won | |
| 29th | 2014 | Lelaki | Finalist | Nominated | |

=== Anugerah Bintang Popular ===
Anugerah Bintang Popular Berita Harian (ABPBH) (English: Berita Harian's Most Popular Star Awards), is an award ceremony that recognises the most popular artists of the year. The award is a yearly ceremony organised by one of Malaysia's newspapers, Berita Harian. The results are entirely based on votes cast by readers. Yuna has received seven nominations and won three awards.

| Bout | Year | Nominated work | Award | Result | Ref |
|---|---|---|---|---|---|
| 23rd | 2009 | Yuna | Popular Female Singer | Nominated | |
| 23rd | 2009 | Yuna | Popular New Artist (Female) | Won | |
| 24th | 2010 | Yuna | Popular Female Singer | Won | |
| 25th | 2011 | Yuna | Popular Female Singer | Won | |
| 26th | 2012 | Yuna | Popular Female Singer | Nominated | |
| 27th | 2013 | Yuna | Popular Female Singer | Nominated | |
| 29th | 2015 | Yuna | Popular Trending Artists | Nominated | |

=== Era FM ===
| Year | Category | Nominated work | Result |
|---|---|---|---|
| 2014 | Best Artist – March | Yuna | Won |
| 2017 | Best Collaboration | Yuna | Nominated |

=== EH! Stail Awards ===
| Year | Category | Nominated Work | Result |
|---|---|---|---|
| 2014 | Most Stylish Female Celebrity | Yuna | Nominated |
| 2014 | Best Achievement Celebrity | Yuna | Nominated |
| 2014 | Choice Magazine Cover Celebrity | Yuna | Nominated |
| 2017 | Best Achievement Celebrity | Yuna | Nominated |

=== InTrend Awards ===
| Year | Category | Nominated work | Result |
|---|---|---|---|
| 2016 | Inspirational Celebrity | Yuna | Pending |
| 2016 | Fashion Iconic Celebrity | Yuna | Pending |

=== Shout! Awards ===
The Shout! Awards is an entertainment award show created to celebrate the Malaysian entertainment scene which is said has rapidly developed. The award recognises people of music, television, film and radio industries, and the entertainment industry as a whole. Yuna has received thirteen nominations and won five awards including the award show highest honour, the Ultimate Shout! Award.

| Bout | Year | Nominated work | Award | Result | Ref |
|---|---|---|---|---|---|
| 2nd | 2010 | Yuna | Break Out Award (Best New Act) | Won | |
| 2nd | 2010 | Yuna | Popstar Award | Won | |
| 2nd | 2010 | Dan Sebenarnya | Mobile Artiste of the Year | Nominated | |
| 2nd | 2010 | Yuna | Ultimate Shout! Award | Won | |
| 3rd | 2012 | Yuna | Popstar Award | Won | |
| 3rd | 2012 | Yuna | Power Vocal Awards | Nominated | |
| 3rd | 2012 | Terukir di Bintang | Music Video Awards | Nominated | |
| 3rd | 2012 | "Bintang di Langit" | Fresh TV Series Awards | Nominated | |
| 3rd | 2012 | Yuna | Wired Celebrity Awards | Won | |
| 4th | 2013 | Dwihati (with Aizat Amdan) | Music Video Award | Nominated | |
| 4th | 2013 | Dwihati (with Aizat Amdan) | Popstar Award | Nominated | |
| 4th | 2013 | Yuna | Popstar Award | Nominated | |
| 4th | 2013 | Yuna | Wired Celebrity Awards | Nominated | |

=== MACP (Music Authors’ Copyright Protection) Awards ===
| Bout | Year | Nominated work | Award | Result |
|---|---|---|---|---|
| 22nd | 2011 | Dan Sebenarnya | Most Performed Malay Song | Won |
| 25th | 2014 | I Wanna Go | Most Performed English Song | Won |
| 26th | 2015 | Rescue | Most Performed English Song | Won |

=== Melodi Awards ===
| Bout | Year | Nominated work | Award | Result |
|---|---|---|---|---|
| 1st | 2013 | Yuna | Dynamic Celebrity | Nominated |
| 1st | 2013 | Yuna | Choice Female Celebrity | Nominated |
| 2nd | 2015 | Yuna | Dynamic Artist | Nominated |
| 3rd | 2016 | Yuna | Melodi Music Personality | Nominated |

=== Bella Awards ===
| Year | Category | Nominated works | Result |
|---|---|---|---|
| 2013 | Bella Creative Award | Yuna | Nominated |

== American Awards ==
=== BET Awards ===
The 17th BET Awards was held at the Microsoft Theater in Los Angeles, California on June 25, 2017. The ceremony celebrated achievements in entertainment and honors music, sports, television, and movies released between April 1, 2016, and March 31, 2017. The nominations were announced on May 15, 2017. Yuna has nominated for one category in 2017.

| Year | Category | Nominated work | Result | Ref |
|---|---|---|---|---|
| 2017 | Centric Award | "Crush" (feat. Usher) | Nominated | |

=== Billboard ===
Billboard is an American entertainment media brand owned by the Billboard-Hollywood Reporter Media Group, a division of Eldridge Industries. It publishes pieces involving news, video, opinion, reviews, events, and style, and is also known for its music charts, including the Hot 100 and Billboard 200, tracking the most popular songs and albums in different genres. It also hosts events, owns a publishing firm, and operates several TV shows.

| Year | Category | Nominated work | Result |
|---|---|---|---|
| 2016 | Top 10 – Billboard Best R&B Albums of 2016 : Critic's Pick | Chapter | Won |

=== MTV Iggy awards ===
| Year | Award | Category | Nominated work | Result |
|---|---|---|---|---|
| 2011 | MTV Iggy | Best New Band in the World | —N/a | Nominated |

=== Nickelodeon Kids Choice Awards ===
The Nickelodeon Kids' Choice Awards (also known as the KCAs or Kids' Choice) is an annual American children's awards ceremony show that is produced by Nickelodeon. Usually held on a Saturday night in late March or early April, the show honors the year's biggest television, movie, and music acts as voted by viewers worldwide of Nickelodeon networks. Yuna has been nominated for 2 category in 2012 Nickelodeon Kids' Choice Awards

| Year | Category | Nominated work | Result | Ref |
|---|---|---|---|---|
| 2012 | Favourite Asian Act | Yuna | Nominated | |
| 2012 | Best New Female Artist | Yuna | Nominated | |

=== People's Choice Awards ===
The People's Choice Awards, officially the E! People's Choice Awards since E! took it over in April 2017, is an American awards show, recognizing people in entertainment, voted online by the general public and fans. The show has been held annually since 1975.

| Year | Category | Nominated work | Result | Ref |
|---|---|---|---|---|
| 2019 | The Most Inspiring Asian Woman 2019 | Yuna | Nominated | |

=== Rolling Stone ===
Rolling Stone is an American monthly magazine that focuses on popular culture. It was founded in San Francisco, California in 1967 by Jann Wenner, who is still the magazine's publisher, and the music critic Ralph J. Gleason. It was first known for its musical coverage and for political reporting by Hunter S. Thompson. In the 1990s, the magazine shifted focus to a younger readership interested in youth-oriented television shows, film actors, and popular music. In recent years, it has resumed its traditional mix of content, including music, entertainment, and politics.

| Year | Category | Nominated work | Result |
|---|---|---|---|
| 2016 | 20 Best R&B Albums of 2016 | Chapter | 6th |

== European Awards ==
=== MTV Europe Music Awards ===
The MTV Europe Music Awards (EMA) is presented by MTV Networks Europe which awards prizes to musicians and performers. Conceived as an alternative to the MTV Video Music Awards and since 2011 other worldwide, regional nominations have been added.

| Bout | Year | Nominated work | Award | Result | Ref |
|---|---|---|---|---|---|
| 19th | 2012 | Yuna | Best Asian Act | Nominated | |
| 21st | 2014 | Yuna | Best Southeast Asian Act | Nominated | |
| 23rd | 2016 | Yuna | Best Southeast Asian Act | Nominated | |

== Worldwide Awards ==
=== World Music Awards ===
2014 World Music Awards was a music awards ceremony that was held on May 27, 2014, at the Salle des Etoiles in Monte Carlo, Monaco. It was the 22nd edition of the show since its start in 1989, and the first ceremony since 2010, after which it went on a four-year hiatus. As of 2018, it has continued another unexplained hiatus stretching four years so far. Yuna has collected 8 nominated in 2014

| Bout | Year | Nominated work | Award | Result | Ref |
|---|---|---|---|---|---|
| 22nd | 2014 | Lelaki | Worlds Best Song | Nominated | |
| 22nd | 2014 | Rescue | Worlds Best Song | Nominated | |
| 22nd | 2014 | Nocturnal | Worlds Best Album | Nominated | |
| 22nd | 2014 | Lelaki | Worlds Best Video | Nominated | |
| 22nd | 2014 | Home | Worlds Best Video | Nominated | |
| 22nd | 2014 | Yuna | Worlds Best Female Artist | Nominated | |
| 22nd | 2014 | Yuna | Worlds Best Live Act | Nominated | |
| 22nd | 2014 | Yuna | Worlds Best Entertainer of the Year | Nominated | |

== Asian Awards ==
=== VIMA Music Awards ===
| Year | Category | Nominated work | Result |
|---|---|---|---|
| 2008 | Best Pop Vocalist | Yuna | Won |
| 2009 | Best Song to Play at Camp Fire and to Do Away with Monday Morning Blues | Deeper Conversation | Nominated |
| 2009 | Best Overall Female Vocalist | Yuna | Nominated |
| 2009 | Best Acoustic Act | Yuna | Nominated |
| 2009 | Song of the Year | Backpacking Around Europe | Nominated |

== Other ==
| Year | Award | Category | Nominated work | Result |
|---|---|---|---|---|
| PPMH Awards | Stylo Artist Award | —N/a | Nominated | |
| PPMH Awards | Promising Artist Award | —N/a | Won | |
| Brandlaureate Awards | Special Award – Grand Master Brand Icon | —N/a | Won | |
| 2015 | The Boombox Awards| R&B Video of The Year | Come Back | Nominated | |
