= Sorry (Beyoncé song) =

2016 single by Beyoncé

- Adapted from the Lemonade booklet

Single by Beyoncé

from the album Lemonade
- Released: May 3, 2016
- Studio: The Beehive (Los Angeles)
- Genre: Electro-R&B; electropop
- Length: 3:52
- Label: Parkwood; Columbia
- Songwriters: Beyoncé; Diana Gordon; Sean Rhoden
- Producers: Beyoncé; MeLo-X; Diana Gordon

Beyoncé singles chronology
"Formation" (2016)	"Sorry" (2016)	"Hold Up" (2016)

Music video
- "Sorry" on YouTube

"Sorry" is a song by American singer Beyoncé from her sixth studio album, Lemonade (2016). It was written and produced by Beyoncé, Diana Gordon, and MeLo-X. Columbia Records and Parkwood Entertainment released the song to radio as the album's second single on May 3, 2016. "Sorry" is an electro-R&B and electropop song with a thumping rhythm created by drum beats, synthesizers, and bells. The song's lyrics revolve around the protagonist dealing with the betrayal of a partner with another woman.

The song's music video is part of Beyoncé's 2016 film Lemonade, aired on HBO alongside the album's release. Due to the numerous allegations featured in the song, media linked it to the singer and her husband, Jay-Z. Music critics generally praised the theme and tone of "Sorry" as unapologetic and self-empowering, and its sound as catchy. "Sorry" debuted and peaked at number eleven on the US Billboard Hot 100. It was certified triple platinum by the Recording Industry Association of America for selling over three million copies in the country.

The song's music video is part of a one-hour film with the same title as its parent album, Lemonade, which originally aired on HBO on April 23, 2016. It was later released to Vevo on June 22, 2016, as the first standalone clip from the album. It features a spoken word poetry by Somali-English poet Warsan Shire, Beyoncé dancing along with a group of female dancers with painted bodies and a cameo appearance by tennis player Serena Williams. Beyoncé performed "Sorry" live during The Formation World Tour (2016), at the 2018 Coachella festival and as part of the set list of her co-headlining tour with Jay Z, the On the Run II Tour.

== Background and recording ==
"Sorry" was written and produced by Diana Gordon, MeLo-X, and Beyoncé. Hit-Boy served as the track's co-producer, Stuart White handled the additional production and Beyoncé was responsible for the vocal production. It was recorded with the guidance of Stuart White at the Beehive Studios in Los Angeles. White also handled the song's audio mixing and mix engineering. The mastering of "Sorry" was finished by Dave Kutch at two studios: The Mastering Palace NYC and Pacifique Recording Studios located in North Hollywood. Crissy Collins provides backing vocals throughout the song.

Beyoncé first heard of MeLo-X after he had released an EP titled Yoncé-X (2014) consisting of unauthorized remixes of songs from her fifth self-titled studio album. She invited him to collaborate on various projects, including On the Run, her co-headliner tour with Jay-Z. The following year, MeLo-X was invited to work with the singer during the sessions for her sixth studio album, Lemonade; two of the tracks he worked on, "Hold Up" and "Sorry" were included on its final track listing. During an interview with Pitchfork, he elaborated about his work on "Sorry", recalling that it was written in mid-2015. While conceiving the track, MeLo-X tried to incorporate dancehall influences, something that was part of his culture as a Jamaican. He described the idea behind "Sorry" as "pretty simple": "It was just some cool keys, drum patterns, and we started putting down vocal ideas and lyric ideas". Later, Hit-Boy contributed to the song, adding various sounds and layers. MeLo-X further pointed out that "Sorry" was a "vital point" on the record due to "all these different emotions and different sounds and different layers". "Sorry" was sent to rhythmic contemporary radio in the United States on May 3, 2016, as the album's second single. It was also serviced to contemporary hit radio stations in Italy and the United States on May 6 and 10, 2016, respectively.

== Composition and lyrical analysis ==
"Sorry"
A sample of "Sorry", showing the bleeping electronic production composed of pulsing synths, skittering drum machines, and lo-fi hi-hats

"Sorry" is an up-tempo electro-R&B and electropop track with a thumping and bleeping beat. Drowned in Sound writer Giuseppe Zevolli called it an emulation of early 2000s R&B. The 405's Samantha O'Connor described it as an "electro-infused" track. It is instrumentally complete with shattering drum beats, synthesizers and bells, the latter instruments prominent throughout the chorus. The drum machines, played with a Roland TR-808, are coated in reverb, and the hi-hats are manipulated with lo-fi effects. The Atlantic writer Spencer Kornhaber likened the electronic layers of "Sorry" to the 2015 song of the same name by Justin Bieber. He further found its chorus similar to Top 40 music, but with a "glassy-eyed distance to the song, a purposeful malaise". Mike Wass of the website Idolator felt that "Sorry" was intended as a female response to "IDFWU" (2014) by Big Sean and further found similar phrases.

The song's lyrics revolve around the protagonist's cheating lover and her way of coping with the adultery. Following the release of Lemonade speculations arose about the singer's husband Jay-Z's alleged infidelity with a mistress referred to as "Becky". Jon Pareles in The New York Times pointed out that many of the accusations were "aimed specifically and recognizably" at him. Similarly, Rob Sheffield of Rolling Stone magazine noted the lines "Suck on my balls, I've had enough" were an "unmistakable hint" that the lyrics revolve around Jay Z." Alexis Petridis from The Guardian also interpreted the lines as Beyoncé declaring she was prepared to abandon him and take their daughter along. He also found the lyrics "Big homie better grow up" as a reference of the self-given title by Jay-Z during his guest appearance on their past collaboration "Crazy in Love" (2003). NME writer Larry Bartleet was of the opinion that the singer was "thrillingly honest sucker-punch" on the song's lyrics aimed at Jay-Z. On the other hand, Lindsay Mannering from Bustle magazine felt that it was hard to determine whether the lyrics were inspired by the pair's private life due to the prominent usage of innuendos. However, she later clarified that although the song may not necessarily be autobiographical, "Beyonce has a tendency to reveal her truth through music... so it's possible that 'Sorry' references her emotions after Jay allegedly cheated on her".

"Sorry" has been described as a defiant, spiteful song exemplified in the lyrics, "Looking at my watch, he shoulda been home". The song opens with the lyrics of the hook "Sorry, I ain't sorry", with the protagonist seemingly apologizing for something, but as it turns out later, she adopts an unapologetic stance realizing she was the victim. It features the lyrics "Boy bye" and urges listeners to put their middle fingers up; the singer finds personal empowerment in those lines. The protagonist talk-sings the lines "Today I regret the night I put that ring on" in which she expresses regret over the decision of marrying her husband. She also tells her love interest that she wrote a "Dear John-type letter" for him. During one part, she sings about putting her deuces up which clarifies that she is over the relationship. Andre Grant of HipHopDX noted how the song was a proof of the fast-shifting emotions the protagonist feels throughout "Sorry" as seen in the lines "I ain't sorry / Boy, bye", "He only want me when I'm not there / He better call Becky with the good hair" and "Let's take a toast to the good life / Suicide before you see this tear fall down my eye". Zevolli also opined that the song's second part is "by far one of the most surprising mood-swings on the record".

== Critical reception ==
"Sorry" was highly acclaimed by music critics. Corinne Heller of E! Online dubbed "Sorry" as the "most controversial song" on Lemonade due to the alleged infidelity and "Becky with the good hair" mistress discussed in the lyrics. Amy Zimmerman, writing for The Daily Beast deemed "Sorry" by far the most iconic single and coined it as the song which "introduced the world to Jay Z's most infamous alleged mistress, 'Becky with the good hair'". She also felt that the "incredibly shade-laden line" was similar to "Drake's iconic 'Courtney from Hooters on Peachtree' reference". Spin journalist Greg Tate credited the line mentioning Becky for "breaking the Internet" and praised the fact that it was potent enough to promote the new material by the singer with "few dollops of viral poesy and self-inflicted gossip-mongering". Comparing "Sorry" to Beyoncé's own "style-banger" "7/11", Jillian Mapes in a review for Pitchfork noted how "she turns his side-chicks into memes, which will inevitably become 'better call Becky with the good hair' sweatshirts that Beyoncé can sell for $60 a pop". Vulture's Dee Lockett deemed the song to be a "surefire club" hit from the album with an "instant-quotable line". Ray Rahman from Entertainment Weekly called it a "middle fingers up anthem" which was "sure to be sung by spurned lovers for as long as there are Beckys with good hair". PopMatters writer Evan Sawdey opined that "the middle-finger anthem 'Sorry'... come[s] from a new place, one that is distinct, palpable, and yes, relatable". NME writer Larry Bartleet wrote that the singer expresses a "sorry, not sorry" stance in the song and noted how in the lyrics "suck on my balls", "the sense of release is palpable". Emily Blake from the website Mashable called the song "the fiercest kissoff we've seen from Bey so far".

A Rap-Up writer deemed the "Boy, bye" line as one of the album's catchiest lyrics. Kitty Empire of The Observer called it "electrifying". Shahzaib Hussain from Clash magazine dubbed "Sorry" as "another dazzling feminist club anthem, but with a grittier underbelly, the production off-kilter but no less invigorating". Pretty Much Amazing's Peter Tabakis wrote that the tracks "Sorry" and "6 Inch" on Lemonade were "the equivalent of a post-bloodbath hair flip and door slam". Another writer of the same publication named "Sorry" the album's "zeitgeist-capturing single". Sheffield was highly positive of the singer's voice capabilities, saying they were "the most astounding sound... as she pushes to her bluesiest extremes, like the hilariously nasty way she sneers, 'He's always got them fucking ex-cuuuu-ses.' Now's Kevin Ritchi, noted how by the time the story line of Lemonade comes to the anthemic "Sorry, "[t]he poison darts become sharper... and so do her vocals". HipHopDX's Andre Grant emphasized "Sorry" for being "particularly ear worming" with its "softly chiming" bells. Pareles summarized it as "twitchy, flippant song that's by no means an apology" but "a combative, unglossy track on an album full of them" instead. O'Connor classified "Sorry" as "flippant and fierce". Zevolli called it a "standout" on Lemonade. Maeve McDermott of USA Today opined in his review that although the song was not the most meaningful one by the singer, "it's a breezy, beautiful kiss-off that's enough to tell every below-average person in your life, 'Boy, bye.'"

=== Recognition and accolades ===
Pitchfork named "Sorry" the 41st best song of 2016, while Complex and Spin, the 12th best. In the annual Village Voice's Pazz & Jop mass critics poll of the year's best in music in 2016, "Sorry" was ranked at number 15. Billboard ranked "Sorry" at number two on their "100 Best Pop Songs of 2016" list: "Between "Tell 'em boy bye" memes and the "Becky with the good hair" witchhunt, Beyonce's "Sorry" ignited more online chatter than most non-Trump political campaigns this year. But more importantly, Beyonce executes one miraculous vocal tonal shift after another on "Sorry," going from pissed-off exasperation to dignity at any cost ("Suicide before you see this tear"), to small-voiced vulnerability at the very end. On "Sorry," Beyonce proves your life doesn't have to be perfect for you to remain flawless."

== Commercial performance ==
After the release of Lemonade, "Sorry" managed to appear on several international music charts. It debuted on the US Billboard Hot 100 chart at number 11 on the chart dating May 14, 2016, becoming Beyoncé's second best debut on the chart above her singles "Ring the Alarm" (2006) and "Drunk in Love" (2013). It was only surpassed by "Formation", which entered the chart at number 10 in the same week. In its second week, the song held its peak position, being the only track of the album to do so. "Sorry" also entered on the Hot R&B/Hip-Hop songs chart at number 7, becoming Beyoncé's twenty-fifth top-ten single on the chart and climbed up to number four the following week. According to streaming service Tidal, "Sorry" was streamed 14.2 million times in five days in the US. As of September 2016, "Sorry" has sold 808,787 downloads in the United States. The Recording Industry Association of America awarded the single a triple platinum certification for sales and streams of 3,000,000 units in the country. In Canada, the song debuted and peaked at a position of 40 on the Canadian Hot 100 for the week ending of May 14, 2016.

On the UK Singles Chart, "Sorry" debuted at number 33 on May 5, 2016. The following week, it remained in the same position and then moved to the position of 99, before falling off on May 19, 2016, after three consecutive weeks of charting. On the UK R&B Singles chart it peaked at number nine in its second week of charting. In Australia, the single peaked at number 74 on the ARIA Singles Chart on May 7, 2016. On the component Urban Singles chart in the same country, the song attained a peak position of eight. Elsewhere, it charted at number 62 in France and 82 in Ireland and Sweden.

== Music video ==
=== Development and synopsis ===
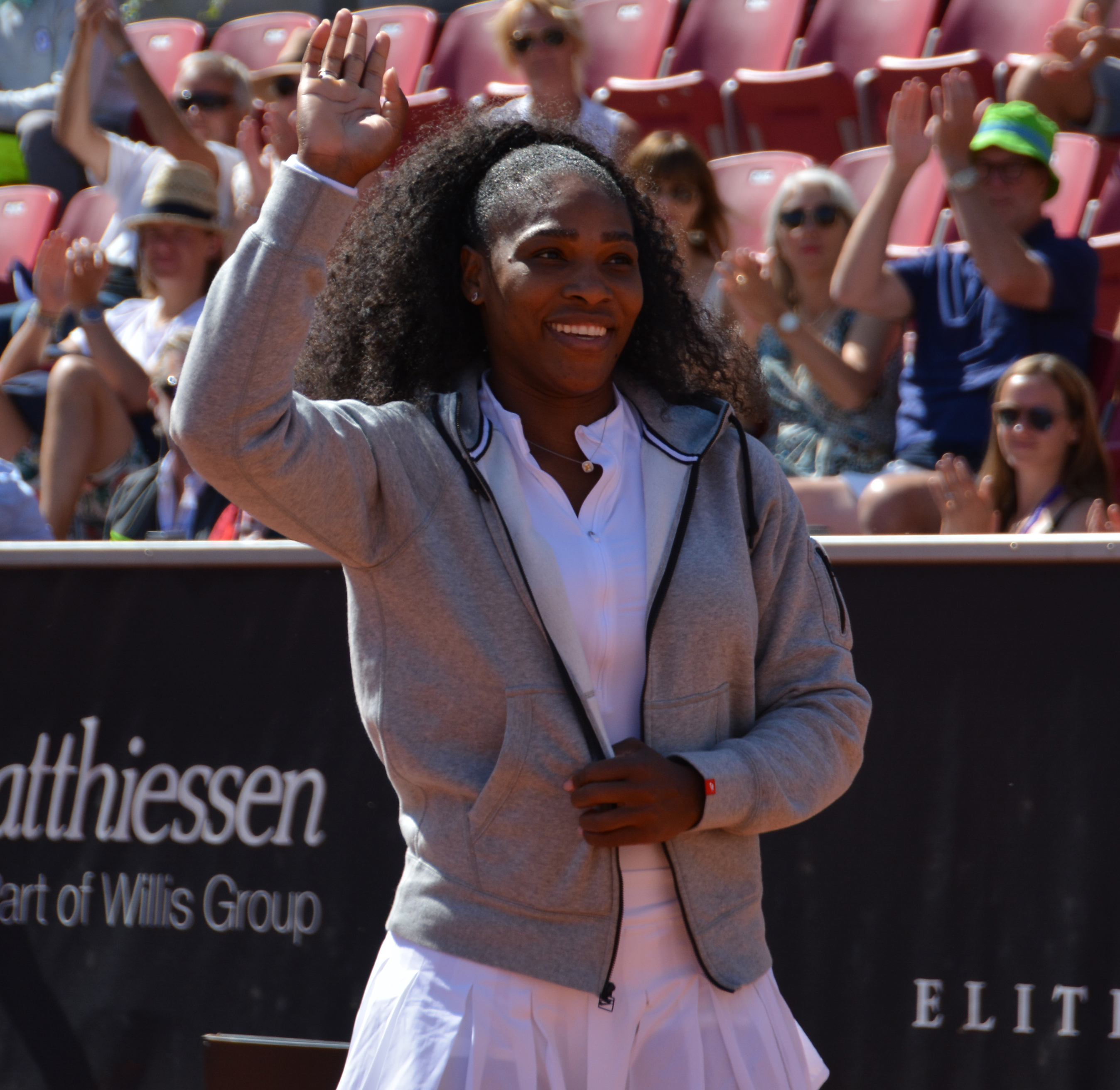
American tennis player Serena Williams makes a cameo appearance in the music video for "Sorry".

A music video for the song, directed by Kahlil Joseph and Beyoncé herself, was included on the parent visual album as part of a one-hour film which premiered on HBO on April 23, 2016. It was later released through Beyoncé's official Vevo account on June 22, 2016, as the first standalone clip to be released from Lemonade following its release in April. It is filmed in black and white and features a cameo appearance by tennis player Serena Williams. Williams was asked to keep her appearance secret prior to the release of the clip. Beyoncé wanted to include her in the video due to the "personification of strength" she represented; she was approached by the director and Beyoncé who were both interested in her contribution to that particular song. While filming, Beyoncé told Williams "just be really free and just dance like nobody's looking and go all out".

In the context of the album's main storyline which follows a woman dealing with her love interest's cheating affair, "Sorry" is placed in the middle, during the stage called "apathy"; the clips opens with that word written across the screen. Beyoncé is then heard reciting a spoken-word poem about infidelity written by Warsan Shire over the slow melody of a jewelry box playing a theme from Pyotr Ilyich Tchaikovsky's ballet Swan Lake. The poem included the lines "So what are you gonna say at my funeral, now that you've killed me?" and "Ashes to ashes, dust to side chicks", the latter text referencing verses from the Bible.

As the song begins, the visual moves to scenes showing the singer with braided hair dancing along with women dressed in tribal costumes and with painted faces and bodies in a Southern mansion and a city bus emblazoned with the words "Boy Bye"; bopping and putting their middle fingers up is a part of their dance choreography in line with the song's lyrics. Adelle Platon of Billboard noted that the dancers' body paint was inspired by Yoruba people. The body painting was called "Sacred Art of the Ori" by Nigerian artist Laolu Senbanjo. Chris Kelly from Fact pointed out how it served as "part of a web of connections between Beyoncé and her lover, Africa and America, pop music and classical". Williams is also seen in numerous scenes moving around the mansion dressed in a black bodysuit and twerking next to Beyoncé who is sitting on a chair resembling a throne. The final scenes see Beyoncé dancing on and in front of the bus, before she closes the clip singing the infamous line "He better call Becky with the good hair".

=== Reception ===
Writing for Rolling Stone, Brittany Spanos summarized that Beyoncé and Williams "dance away heartbreak" in the "stark" clip. Chris Mench of Complex magazine felt the clip was a "tour-de-force of everything fans love about Bey". Cosmopolitan's Gina Mei noted how the fact that Beyoncé was surrounded by "gorgeous, powerful, and independent women" throughout the video made it "a tour de force, and it's all kinds of empowering". Similarly, Zimmer from The Daily Beast noted how the singer was accompanied by "crews of beautiful black women everywhere she goes" in the "good old-fashioned girls rule, boys drool banger". Emily Blake from Mashable.com described the video as "the most epic, middle-finger filled girls-only party this great nation has seen". Houston Chronicle journalist Andrea Waguespack described the visual as "[h]eavy with African influences" and its opening as "chilling". Similarly, Alyssa Bailey in a review for Elle, called the opening monologue "chilling" and pointed out how it becomes "a mesmerizing dance number, flawlessly executed by Beyoncé" afterwards. Carl Williott, writing for Idolator noted how the opening monologue and Williams's cameo were "intact" to the "kiss-off". Alexis Rhiannon from Bustle praised the fact that Beyoncé decided to release "Sorry" as a standalone video in the same form as it appeared on Lemonade. Sarah Murphy of Exclaim! called the clip "already-iconic" when it was released to Vevo. Joi-Marie McKenzie from ABC News felt that Beyoncé was "having the time of her life" while dancing her worries away with the group of females.

InStyle's Kelsey Glein felt that the video's best part was Williams's cameo appearance. PopSugar journalist Quin Keaney wrote that it features "memorable cameo and dance session" with Williams. Refinery29 writer Carolyn L. Todd described the tennis player's dancing as "free and beautiful". Caroline Framke of the website Vox was positive of Williams's cameo appearance and defiant dancing to the song's beat. She noted how its best part was the opening poem which was used to introduce the song in the corresponding film and felt that the lines she recited successfully showed that "she ain't sorry". Nate Jones of Vulture.com felt her dancing should be "marveled" at. Carey O'Donnell from Paper magazine summarized the clip as a "raucous, fierce ladies night, featuring fellow icon Serena Williams, in all her twerking glory". Sophie Hirsh from Mashable pointed out "Sorry" as an album highlight and praised the "endless fierceness" of Beyoncé and Williams. Clash magazine's Shahzaib Hussain felt that the clip for "Sorry" appeared during the album's "feverish" moments. Hussain further summarized the clip as "Queen of the sporting world Serena Williams twerking up a storm while Beyoncé looks on like a Madam, proud of her creation". The video was nominated for Best Choreography at the 2016 MTV Video Music Awards, but lost to "Formation".

== Live performances ==
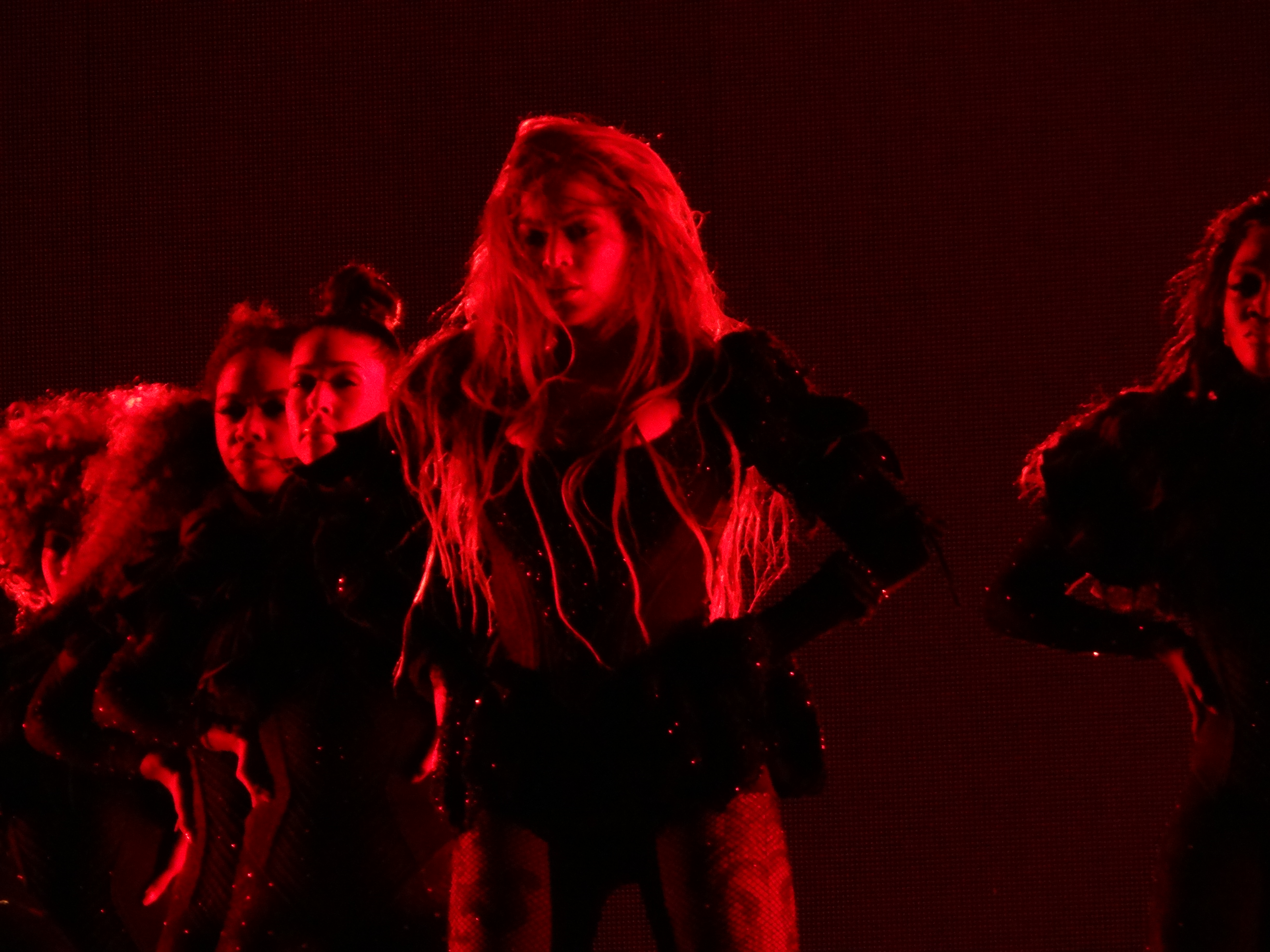
Beyoncé performing "Sorry" as part of The Formation World Tour in 2016

"Sorry" was part of the set list of The Formation World Tour (2016) with the first performance taking place in Miami at the Marlins Park on April 27. The song was performed second during the concerts and the singer appeared on stage alone for the beginning of the performance. She was then joined by female back-up dancers who performed a choreography in line with the song's lyrics, which included putting their middle fingers up. Dee Lockett, writing for Vulture, felt that the inclusion of "Formation" and "Sorry" as the first two songs on the concerts was a "no-brainer opening". Michael Cerio of CBS classified the performance as "fiery". The Sun Chronicle reviewer Lauren Carter chose the performance of "Sorry" as one of the show's highlights. The Guardian writer Caroline Sullivan noted how during the performance of "the bitterest songs" of Lemonade, "Sorry" and "Don't Hurt Yourself", "she's a pillar of rage".

In 2018, the singer performed the song as part of her headline show at Coachella. For the performance, she was backed by a horn section and mid-way through the song she asked of her back-up male dancers to make her laugh. Then she performed a dance break with her female dancers during which the lines "suck on my balls" were repeated. An excerpt of "Me, Myself and I" (2003) was also included as part of the self-empowering message. The same performance was featured during the first shows of Beyoncé's co-headlining On the Run II Tour with her husband Jay Z. While singing the song, she repeatedly asks the females in the audience if they have "had enough". Writing for The Guardian, Rachel Aroesti called it a "faintly chilling haka-style refrain". According to Ed Masley of The Arizona Republic, the performance was a "suitably bitter rendition" with a "withering delivery of the final payoff, 'He better call Becky with the good hair'". Metro Weekly's André Hereford noted that "Sorry" was the peak of a run of dance-heavy hits on the show.

On May 2, 2016, Yuna covered the song during a concert at The Sinclair in Massachusetts. French singer Christine and the Queens also performed the song on BBC's Radio 1's Live Lounge.

== Personnel ==
Credits are adapted from the liner notes of Lemonade.

Song credits

- Writing – Diana "Wynter" Gordon, MeLo-X, Beyoncé Knowles
- Production – MeLo-X, Knowles, Gordon,
- Co-producer – Hit-Boy
- Additional production – Stuart White
- Vocal production – Beyoncé
- Additional programming – B.Carr
- Recording – Stuart White; The Beehive, Los Angeles, California
- Second engineering – Ramon Rivas
- Backing vocals – Crissy Collins
- Audio mixing – Stuart White; Pacifique Recording Studios; North Hollywood, California
- Mix engineering – Stuart White, John Cranfield (assistant)
- Mastering – Dave Kutch; The Mastering Palace NYC, Pacifique Recording Studios, North Hollywood, California

Video credits

- Director – Kahlil Joseph, Beyoncé Knowles Carter
- Producer – Onye Anyanwu
- Editor – Bill Yukich
- Production designer – Hannah Beachler
- Stylist – Marni Senofonte
- Poetry film adaptation – Warsan Shire

== Charts ==
=== Weekly charts ===
Chart (2016)	Peak position
Australia (ARIA)	74
Australia Urban Singles (ARIA)	8
Canada Hot 100 (Billboard)	40
Euro Digital Songs (Billboard)	20
France (SNEP)	62
Iceland (RÚV)	7
Ireland (IRMA)	36
Japan (Billboard)	55
Netherlands Digital Songs (Billboard)	7
Scottish Singles Sales (Official Charts)	30
Sweden (Sverigetopplistan)	82
UK Hip Hop/R&B (Official Charts)	7
UK Singles (Official Charts)	33
US Billboard Hot 100	11
US Hot R&B/Hip-Hop Songs (Billboard)	4
US R&B/Hip-Hop Airplay (Billboard)	3
US Pop Airplay (Billboard)	33
US Rhythmic Airplay (Billboard)	7

=== Year-end charts ===
Chart (2016)	Position
US Billboard Hot 100	71
US Hot R&B/Hip-Hop Songs (Billboard)	23
US Rhythmic (Billboard)	37

== Certifications ==
Region	Certification	Certified units/sales
Australia (ARIA)	Platinum	70,000^{‡}
Brazil (Pro-Música Brasil)	3× Platinum	180,000^{‡}
Canada (Music Canada)	Platinum	80,000^{‡}
New Zealand (RMNZ)	Gold	15,000^{‡}
Poland (ZPAV)	Gold	25,000^{‡}
United Kingdom (BPI)	Gold	400,000^{‡}
United States (RIAA)	4× Platinum	4,000,000^{‡}
^{‡} Sales+streaming figures based on certification alone.

== Release history ==
"Sorry" release history
Region	Date	Format	Label(s)	Ref.
United States	May 3, 2016	Rhythmic contemporary radio	Parkwood; Columbia	
Italy	May 6, 2016	Radio airplay	Sony	
United States	May 10, 2016	Contemporary hit radio	Parkwood; Columbia	
