= Legal education in Malaysia =

As a commonwealth country, the Malaysian legal education system is rooted from the United Kingdom. Legal qualifications offered by the local law faculties require students to have a pre-university qualification such as the Malaysian Higher School Certificate, A-Level, International Baccalaureate, Foundation Course or a Diploma. Generally, the law degree programmes in Malaysia consist of civil law subjects, but there are institutions such as International Islamic University Malaysia and Universiti Sultan Zainal Abidin that include Sharia or Islamic law courses as requirements for admission and graduation.

Legal qualifications in Malaysia can be obtained by four routes.

1. The first route is the Bachelor of Laws (Hons) or LL.B (Hons) programme with a minimum of four years of full-time study from recognised local universities and a private university : University of Malaya, International Islamic University Malaysia, National University of Malaysia and Universiti Teknologi MARA. In 2008, LL.B (Hons) from Multimedia University and Universiti Utara Malaysia were recognised. In 2013, LL.B (Hons) from Universiti Sultan Zainal Abidin was given provisional recognition and by 2015 full recognition has been accorded.
2. The second route is the three year degree programme known as the Bachelor of Legal Studies (Hons) or BLS (Hons) offered by the Universiti Teknologi MARA (UiTM). Upon completion of the BLS (Hons) programme, the students can choose either to work as legal advisors / legal executives but they are not fully qualified to apply to be advocates and solicitors. If they choose to practice as advocates and solicitors, they have to be vetted and short-listed to continue with a one year Bachelor of Laws (Hons) or LL.B (Hons) programme offered by UiTM. Those who are not short-listed may sit for the Certificate in Legal Practice or CLP examination or re-apply after gaining working experience. The LL.B(Hons) programme from UiTM is unique in the country in which the students are put in a simulated legal office environment in which they are designated in firms and given case studies. The programme is designed after the Inns of Court in England.
3. The third route is the three year degree programme known as the Bachelor of Jurisprudence (Hons) or B.Juris (Hons) from the University of Malaya (UM). It is taught externally at private institutions but B.Juris (Hons) may also be awarded to University of Malaya's students who can't or choose not to proceed to the fourth and final year of the LL.B (Hons) programme. B.Juris (Hons) is equivalent to Bachelor of Legal Studies (Hons) from UiTM. It is a popular alternative to LL.B (Hons) from University of London International Programme. Upon graduation, the students need to sit for the Certificate in Legal Practice examination to practice law.
4. The fourth route is the three year LL.B (Hons) from shortlisted universities in the United Kingdom (including B.A Law from Oxford and Cambridge), New Zealand and Australia. There are private institutions in Malaysia that offer such LL.B (Hons) programme through twinning arrangements. Students do their degree one year in Malaysia and two years at the foreign universities (1+2). The LL.B (Hons) from the University of London International Programmes is the only recognised foreign degree that can be fully completed at the local private institutions. Upon graduation, the students need to sit for the Certificate in Legal Practice examination to practice law.

Historically, admission by legal articleship or clerkship was accepted but such route is no longer existed.

Apart from the above-mentioned four routes, in order for the graduates to be eligible to practice as Advocates and Solicitors, they need to complete their pupillage period (also known as reading in chambers or chambering) for nine months before being called to the Bar.

== Development of a Common Bar Course ==
In May 2008, minister in the Prime Minister's Department Zaid Ibrahim, who was also the then de facto Minister of Law announced that the CLP would be scrapped and be replaced with the Common Bar Course and the Common Bar Exam. This proposed exam will be compulsory for every student wishing to practice in Malaysia, including local graduates. On 29 October 2024, the implementation of the system was heard in the Dewan Rakyat.

The Malaysian Bar has been advocating a Common Bar Course (CBC) and Examination (CBE) since the 1980s as a single entry point to the legal profession for both local and foreign law graduates.

Early in March 2011, the Attorney-General announced that the Legal Qualifying Board was considering implementing the CBC. Court of Appeal judge Datuk Abdul Wahab Patail is chairing a working group to study its implementation. The CBC would be a 20-month course that would also focus on vocational skills. The CBC model combines the modern legal education approaches in other Commonwealth countries as well as local requirements. There will be modules not commonly seen in other courses to meet specific needs among local graduates, such as the Legal Language and Communication Skills to address the poor command of English and the Practice Management Skills to expose lawyers intending to start their own firm on risk management. Of the five semesters, the first three are full-time studies while the final two are part-time, where students will be pupils at law firms concurrently. It will also feature a Student Law Office programme where the “students-at-law” will get to practice what they have learned in a simulated legal environment, which has been successfully carried out in Universiti Teknologi MARA.
