= MeLo-X =

American disc jockey (born 1985)

- Born: Sean Rhoden; 1985 (age 40–41); Brooklyn, New York, United States
- Genres: Dancehall; reggae; EDM
- Occupations: Disc jockey; record producer

Sean Rhoden, known professionally MeLo-X, is an American disc jockey and record producer. MeLo-X co-wrote two songs for Beyoncé's Lemonade album in 2016: "Hold Up" and "Sorry".

MeLo-X is one half of the electro/dancehall/reggae duo Electric Punanny, along with Jasmine Solano. They have toured internationally, performing deejay sets at festivals such as Glastonbury, Afropunk and SXSW.

== Early life ==
MeLo-X was born to Jamaican parents in the East Flatbush neighborhood of the New York City borough of Brooklyn.

== Career ==
In 2009, MeLo-X toured with Theophilus London, serving as deejay. On the side, he remixed songs from other artists, without permission.

A remix by Melo-X of Yuna's 2012 song "Live Your Life" is heard in Grand Theft Auto V, on the fictional “Worldwide FM” radio station within the game.

In 2014, MeLo-X remixed five songs from Beyoncé's album Beyoncé, the project titled Yoncé-X, which MeLo-X posted to various websites such as SoundCloud and YouTube. Beyoncé's label kept having the remix album removed from each new hosting site for copyright violations, but after seeing the uploaded video for "Drunk in Lust," MeLo-X's unauthorized remix of "Drunk in Love," Beyoncé invited him to make music for the On the Run Tour, a co-headlining tour by Jay-Z and Beyoncé. MeLo-X relates: "They already had the story and the outline for the tour. The whole story is like you're watching a film and it's narrated by the music that they created... We'd sit and talk about the sounds. Then I'd go and create something. It was a mix of my ideas, with Beyoncé and Jay Z. I'd try to complement them. I'd try to find a meeting point of what I do and what they wanted." MeLo-X said that, for a climactic car-chase scene, he took Kanye West's song "Hell of a Life", changing and chopping it in the trap EDM style, making it into a two-minute piece to fit the concert visuals.

After this, MeLo-X collaborated with Beyoncé and Jay-Z in writing two songs for Beyoncé's Lemonade album: "Hold-Up" and "Sorry". "Hold Up" was certified Gold in the U.S. and Australia, and "Sorry" was certified Platinum in the U.S. MeLo-X said he encountered the song "Hold Up" after much of it had been composed by Father John Misty and MNEK. MeLo-X wrote some of the song's lyrics, and provided background vocals, saying, "I love how my vocals were used because it feels like it's a sample under her voice during the chorus." The song "Sorry" was co-written and co-produced by MeLo-X and Wynter Gordon. As well, MeLo-X scored the music for Beyoncé's Lemonade visual album.

MeLo-X also created music and sounds for Beyoncé's The Formation World Tour. For instance, when a mechanical lift at center stage rises upward, a sound that MeLo-X designed is played to represent the movement.

MeLo-X released an EP titled Curate in October 2015. The EP took the form of a software application within which the listener can move a pointer to change the beat and the reverb. MeLo-X calls the octahedron-shaped pointer the "infinity stone." Songs on the EP feature performances by Little Simz, Raury, and Kilo Kish. The next year, PartyNextDoor hired MeLo-X to bring the same visual style to his Summer's Over Tour.

MeLo-X produced and performed on a remix of the song "Find Your Way Back" on the deluxe version of Beyonce's album The Lion King: The Gift which was released on July 31, 2020, to coincide with the release of the Knowles-Carter/Disney + film Black Is King.

== Electric Punanny ==
In 2007, MeLo-X met Jasmine Solano at the Sway nightclub in New York City. They collaborated in 2008 to create a monthly deejay party under the name Electric Punanny. The music is a fusion of electro-funk, dancehall and reggae. Early shows were at the 205 Club, but the show gained a larger following at the Sway Lounge. The duo began to tour internationally and to release music together. In 2013, they performed in France, Japan and Australia, including a set for the Island Vibe Festival on Stradbroke Island (Minjerribah). Personal electronics maker House of Marley sponsored a tour of North America in early 2014, including a performance at the "Do Over Party" in Palm Springs after the Coachella Valley Music and Arts Festival. In June 2014, Electric Punanny played the Glastonbury Festival, at the Blues Stage in the Silver Hayes area. They played at the Afropunk Festival in Brooklyn in August 2014. The group's techno-dancehall mashup "Rosa Caleta" was their first release together in October 2014, the song named after a Jamaican restaurant in Berlin. After performing in China, Korea, Indonesia, the Philippines and Singapore, the duo played SXSW in March 2015. In 2017, Electric Punanny released the song "Tiger Eye" featuring Donae'o. This was followed by "Gymnastics On Fire", a summer jam featuring the Afro-R&B collective The.Wav, released on the EPINTL label by Beatport.

== Musical style and influences ==
MeLo-X brings together in his music many different musical genres, especially dancehall and reggae from his family's Jamaican heritage. His deejay sets often combine tropical grooves with various hip hop and electronic dance beats. MeLo-X cites Big Pun, the Hot Boys, and rapper DMX along with his producer Swizz Beatz as inspirations for his own music career.

== Photography ==
After taking a trip to Equatorial Guinea and South Africa, MeLo-X had a showing of his photography in 2014 at the Sean Kelly Gallery in New York.

== Production discography ==
Title	Year	Artist(s)	Album	Writing	Producing
"Hold Up"	2016	Beyoncé	Lemonade	check	
"Sorry"	2016	Beyoncé	Lemonade	check	check
"Indie Girls" (featuring Trinidad James, Little Simz, and Kilo Kish)	2016	Jesse Boykins III	Bartholomew	check	
"Cleopatra"	2016	Anik Khan	Kites	check	check
"Body"	2017	Syd	Fin	check	check
"Heebiejeebies" (featuring Kehlani)	2017	Aminé	Good for You	check	
"The Uber Song"	2017	DRAM	Non-album single		check
"Maybe, One Day" (featuring Lord Narf)	2017	Kari Faux	Primary	check	check
"Boss"	2018	The Carters	Everything Is Love		check
"40 Shades of Choke"	2018	Ari Lennox	Non-album single	check	check
"Find Your Way Back" (remix)	2020	Beyoncé	The Lion King: The Gift (deluxe edition)	check	check
"Move" (featuring Grace Jones & Tems)	2022	Beyoncé	Renaissance		check
