= Certificate in Legal Practice (Malaysia) =

The Certificate in Legal Practice (CLP) is a 9-month post-graduate course and examination taken by foreign law graduates and graduates of the Bachelor of Jurisprudence (Hons) from the University of Malaya and Bachelor of Legal Studies (Hons) from Universiti Teknologi MARA, to become a qualified lawyer in Malaysia.

The examination is conducted by the Legal Profession Qualifying Board of Malaysia and is governed by the Legal Profession Act 1976. The Board allows degree holders from selected universities in the United Kingdom, Australia, and New Zealand to sit for the examination. The Board also allows graduates from certain university to be exempted from this examination.

To be called to bar, CLP graduates, like other prospective lawyers, must also undertake a nine-month pupillage under a pupil master who has practiced in Malaysia for at least seven years.

== History ==
The Certificate in Legal Practice was originally designed in 1984 only as a temporary stop-gap measure to assist those Malaysians who were not able to sit for the English Bar Finals Examinations. It was then a solution to those who can't apply to be a Barrister but ended up as another recognised legal qualification to be an advocate and solicitor in Malaysia.

== Examination ==
Examinations are normally held around July each year. Every student is required to sit for five subject papers, namely, General Paper, Professional Practice, Evidence, Criminal Procedure, and Civil Procedure. The student must pass all papers to obtain the certificate. If a student fails one paper he or she may be given a conditional pass and be allowed to resit that subject two more times. However, if a student failed in two or more papers, he must sit for the whole examination again to obtain the certificate. Each student is allowed to sit for the examination four times.

The Legal Profession Qualifying Board only sets the examination and does not provide classes to prepare the candidate for the examination. Classes were initially conducted by the Faculty of Law, University of Malaya and later Faculty of Law, Universiti Teknologi MARA but the task was subsequently delegated to private colleges only. Three of the major institutions that offer tuition for the CLP in Kuala Lumpur are Brickfields Asia College, Advance Tertiary College (formerly Kemayan ATC), and HELP University. ATC also offers the course in its Penang Campus.

== Criticism and controversies ==
By the design of the CLP Board, the examination has an annual passing rate of between 10% and 20%, such that only the best candidates may qualify as lawyers.

The CLP board noted in an article published in The Star in 2008: "The examination is not a test of memory function by the candidates. It is the mediocre candidates who resort to regurgitation of information memorized by them."

The Professional Practice paper, for example, covers Land Law, Probate and Administration of Estates, Bankruptcy and Winding Up, Ethics of the Legal Profession, and Advocacy. Any person familiar with legal education would understand that Land Law is among the bulkiest subjects.

On 15 April 2019, the Legal Profession Qualifying Board added Legal Profession Act 1976, Contracts Act 1950, Specific Relief Act 1950, Civil Law Act 1956 and Insolvency Act 1967 and the Rules to the list of Statutes permitted. The candidates are now allowed to bring the following statutes for the respective papers:

Examination Paper	Statute allowed
Civil Procedure Paper	1. Rules of Court 2012
Criminal Procedure Paper	1. Criminal Procedure Code
Evidence Paper	1. Evidence Act 1950
Professional Paper	1. Legal Profession Act 1976; 2. Insolvency Act 1967 and the Rules; 3. National Land Code 1965
General Paper	1. Contracts Act 1950; 2. Specific Relief Act 1950; 3. Civil Law Act 1956

However, candidates are still denied access to many relevant Statutes (Acts of Parliaments) during the exams, such as the Companies Act 2016, Winding Up Rules 1997, Probate and Administration Act 1959, Legal Profession (Practice & Etiquette) Rules 1978, Legal Profession (Publicity) Rules, and many more.

In 2007, the then CLP Director, Khalid Yusoff, was jailed three months for forgery and cheating in the July 2001 CLP examination "master list". In May 2010, he was freed by the Court of Appeal.
