= Jasmine Solano =

American musician and disc jockey

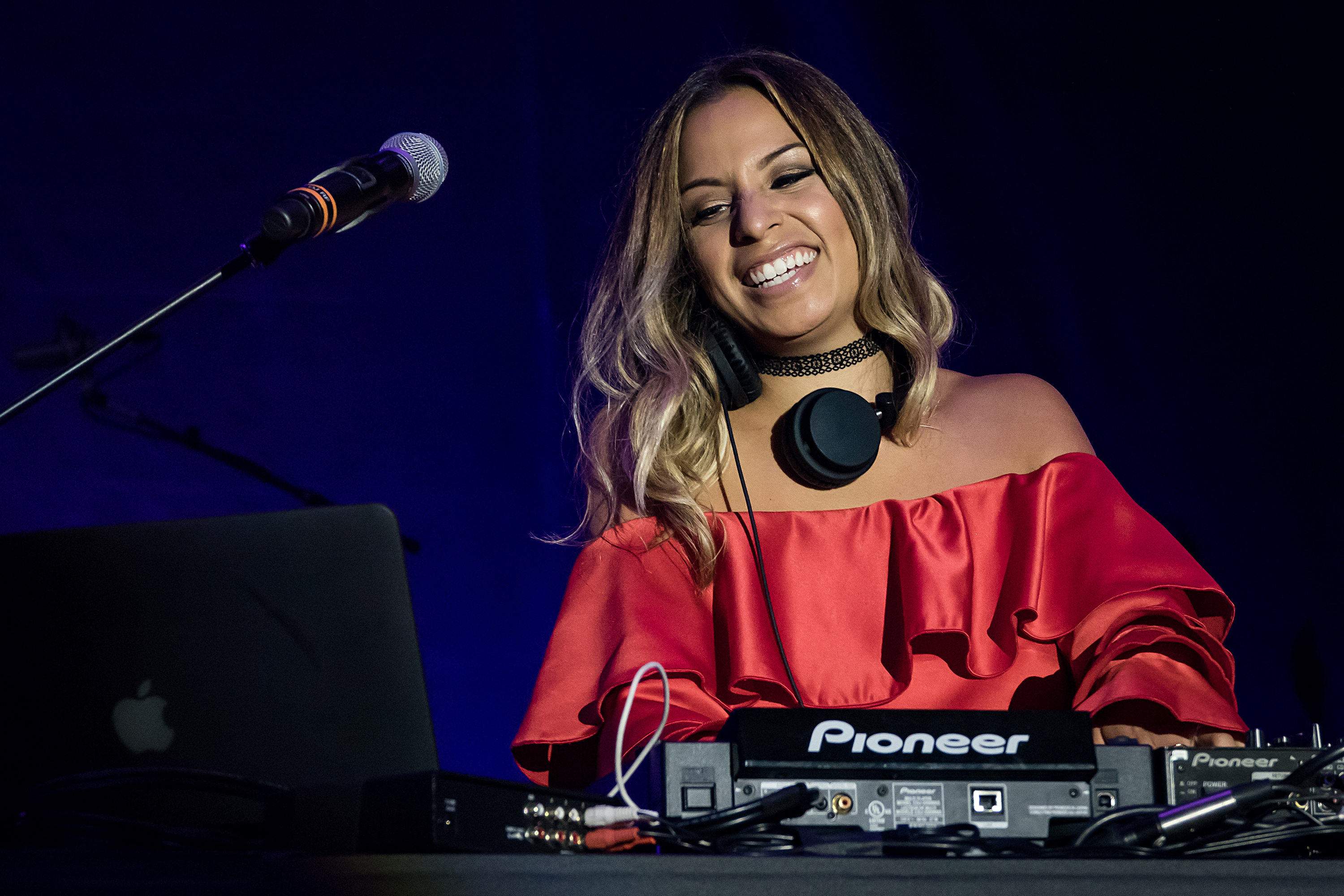
- Jasmine Solano in 2016

Background information
- Also known as: XOJSMN
- Born: Philadelphia, Pennsylvania, U.S.
- Occupations: Deejay, musician, brand ambassador
- Years active: 2002–present
- Member of: Electric Punanny
- Website: xojsmn.com

Jasmine Solano is an American musician and disc jockey who founded and hosted the Scratch the Surface series on MTV, and in 2008 she teamed with DJ MeLo-X to perform internationally as Electric Punanny.

Solano created a radio show called "The Secret Spot" on WERS in Boston, and she has written and performed alternative hip-hop songs, including "That's Not It", with a video directed by Vashtie Kola in 2010, "Turn It Up" in 2011, and "One on One" featuring Yelawolf in 2012. She has deejayed for Ninjasonik, Wiz Khalifa, Talib Kweli and Melanie Fiona.

Solano is a political activist, using music and art to express political ideas. In 2017, she created the global photography/community series "Unity in Color" to promote women's rights around the world. As a brand ambassador, she has modeled clothing, curated playlists, and blogged to promote brands.

== Early life ==
Solano was born and raised in Philadelphia, the daughter of parents from two different cultures: her mother is from northeast U.S. and her father is from Indonesia. She learned to appreciate Motown songs and classic R&B from her mother's taste in music. At the age of nine, Solano began to play tennis seriously. The same year she danced at a talent show to the song "Shoop" by Salt-N-Pepa. At 15 she was choreographing breakdancing moves for shows, and performing poetry and spoken word at open mic events. She was part of the Okayplayer movement, making music with friends, beginning with rap lyrics. With music engaging more of her life, she decided at age 15 or 16 to focus on a music career rather than on professional tennis. With the 2001 United States invasion of Afghanistan, Solano started combining music and political activism, organizing a multimedia protest against war. She learned turntablism from a friend who worked at Siren Records in the Doylestown area north of Philadelphia, and by watching videos of deejay competitions.

== College ==
Solano chose to form her own music activism major at Emerson College in Boston, combining music production, marketing and politics. In December 2002 at age 17 she began deejaying at Boston's WERS 88.9 FM radio station, then in 2005–2006 she served as the station's program director, creating a late night show called "The Secret Spot" in which she took calls, gave advice on love, and played soul/R&B slow jams. The show is the origin of her stage name Jasmine Solano, and it earned her the "Best Female Radio Personality" at the New England Urban Music Awards in 2006. During her college years, Solano participated in the Semester at Sea program, taking the opportunity to connect with the underground music scene of ten different countries.

== Career ==
In 2009, Solano opened Rock the Bells with her DJ set. After that exposure, MySpace marketing connected with Solano, giving her the opportunity to open for Rakim and The Clipse. Red Bull Music Academy also noticed Solano, inviting her to deejay and host shows starting in late 2009 in New York City. In 2010, Solano toured with Wiz Khalifa as his DJ for 60 concerts across the U.S.

Solano hosted another radio show starting in 2014 on Radio Lily, with tropical- and reggae-themed music broadcast from Miss Lily's store in New York City for two hours each Tuesday afternoon. She also produced a monthly event at the W Hotel in New York City in 2014–2015, creating a "Velvet Dreams" mix for the hotel. Other VJ and DJ clients include MTV, HBO, Apple, Margiela, Fendi, Nike, Adidas, Cosmopolitan, and Nylon magazine.

MTV World created a global music initiative in October 2011, called MTV Iggy. Solano hosted a series on MTV Iggy which started airing in 2014: Scratch the Surface. The program was conceived by Solano as a way to show the viewer something interesting about the music world in every city she visited. MTV Iggy was dissolved in 2015.

Solano played a set in Palm Springs during the Coachella Valley Music and Arts Festival in April 2017, as part of an all-female deejay pop-up party sponsored by Beats by Dre.

== Electric Punanny ==
In 2007, Solano and MeLo-X met at the Sway nightclub in New York City. They collaborated in 2008 to create a monthly deejay party under the name Electric Punanny. The music was a fusion of electro-funk, dancehall and reggae. Early shows were at the 205 Club, but the show gained a larger following at the Sway Lounge. The duo began to tour internationally and to release music together. In 2013, they performed in France, Japan and Australia, including a set for the Island Vibe Festival on Stradbroke Island (Minjerribah). Personal electronics maker House of Marley sponsored a tour of North America in early 2014, including a performance at the "Do Over Party" in Palm Springs after the Coachella Valley Music and Arts Festival. In June 2014, Electric Punanny played the Glastonbury Festival, at the Blues Stage in the Silver Hayes area. They played at the Afropunk Festival in Brooklyn in August 2014. The group's techno-dancehall mashup "Rosa Caleta" was their first release together in October 2014, the song named after a Jamaican restaurant in Berlin. After performing in China, Korea, Indonesia, the Philippines and Singapore, the duo played SXSW in March 2015. In 2017, Electric Punanny released the song "Tiger Eye" featuring Donae'o. This was followed by "Gymnastics On Fire", a summer jam featuring the Afro-R&B collective The Wav, released on the EPINTL label by Beatport.

== Brand ambassador ==
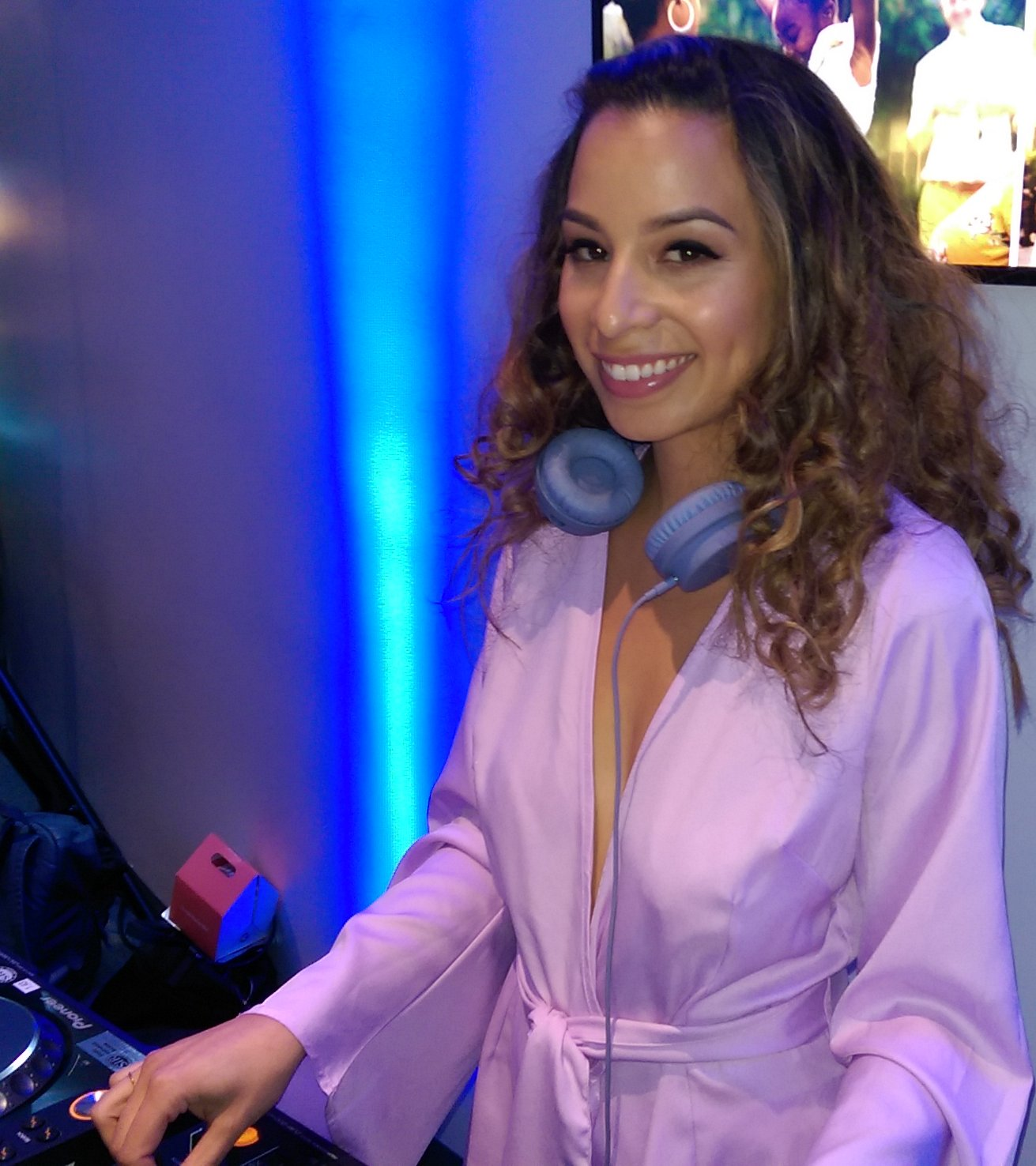
Solano spinning for a private party in 2018

Solano has worked as a brand ambassador, promoting clients' brands in various ways. In 2011, she modeled for the Summer Lookbook of Leah McSweeney's "Married to the Mob" fashion line, and she posed and performed for Jay-Z's Rocawear Fall 2011 line, rapping her own words over beats by Jay-Z. For Nike, she posed for the January 2012 Holiday Lookbook, then modeled for 10 Deep's Summer line. The same year, she blogged on the platform BurtonGirls.com for Burton Snowboards. Burton tapped Solano again in 2013 to model Gwen Stefani's Lamb brand winter clothing. Solano served as brand ambassador for Adidas Women during 2015–2016. She also modeled Timberland boots in 2016. In 2017, L'Oréal featured her in a global campaign.

In 2016, Solano curated a playlist for ONS Clothing of New York City.

Deejay hardware and software company Serato lists Solano as an exemplary artist representing the Serato brand.

== Activism ==
In January 2017, Solano founded the Unity in Color movement, a photography series showing communities around the world, brought together to promote women's rights. In the first year, the movement had gathered 1,300 men, women and children in 4 countries taking part in 30 photo shoots.

== Musical style and influences ==
As a deejay, Solano has played many types of music. At WERS in Boston, she started spinning hip-hop, R&B and reggae, then she created the show "The Secret Spot" which featured sexy slow jams. Through Electric Punanny, her musical tastes run to African and Caribbean beats combined with classic soul/R&B and high-energy dance music. Solano says she may prepare a playlist for a specific party, but then the mood of the party brings to mind other songs to blend in, so that most of her work is freestyle deejaying.

To personally recharge, Solano listens to jazz and neo-soul music.

Solano lists Betty Davis, Nikka Costa, Erykah Badu, and Gwen Stefani as strong women in music who have influenced her work. She has named DJ Qbert and Mix Master Mike as inspirations for her own career in turntablism.
