= Nocturnal (Yuna album) =

Studio album by Yuna
- Released: 29 October 2013
- Recorded: 2013
- Genre: Pop; indie pop; dream pop
- Length: 41:28
- Label: Verve
- Producer: Ben Willis (exec.); Dahlia Ambach Caplin (exec.); Josh Andriano (exec.); Robin Hannibal; Tomas Barfod; Jeppe Kjellberg; Chris Braide; Om'Mas Keith; Chad Hugo; Michael Einziger

Yuna chronology
Yuna (2012)	Nocturnal (2013)	Material (2015)

Yuna international albums chronology
Yuna (2012)	Nocturnal (2013)	Chapters (2016)

Singles from Nocturnal
- 1. "Rescue" Released: 27 August 2013; 2. "Falling" Released: 29 October 2013; 3. "Come Back" Released: 12 July 2014

Nocturnal is the fourth studio album and second international album by Malaysian singer-songwriter Yuna. It was released on 29 October 2013 by Verve Records. The album was preceded by the release of the lead single "Rescue", which was released on 27 August 2013. Nocturnal debuted and peaked at number 27 on the Billboard Heatseekers Albums chart.

== Background and development ==
On 4 September 2013, Yuna released the cover artwork for Nocturnal, which depicts her in a floral foreground setting. The official track listing for the album was confirmed by Artistdirect on 13 September. On 25 October, the album was made available for streaming in full before it was released.

== Singles ==
"Rescue" was released as Nocturnal's lead single on 27 August 2013. It garnered a positive review from MTV Hive, who described the song as a "kick-yourself-in-the-ass ray of sunshine". On 24 September, an official lyric video for the single was released, in which fans were asked to submit Polaroid images with the song's lyrics written beneath them.

== Critical reception ==
Professional ratings
Review scores
Source	Rating
AllMusic	4.0/5 stars
Sputnikmusic	4.0/5 stars
Exclaim!	9/10
PopMatters	7.0/10 stars
Boston Globe	Positive

Upon release, Nocturnal received rave reviews from contemporary music critics. Matt Collar of AllMusic rated the album four out of five stars, stating that it delivers a "delicate girl power vibe", while comparing Yuna's vocals to those of Sixpence None the Richer's Leigh Nash and English recording artist Ellie Goulding. The Boston Globe's Ken Capobianco gave the album a positive review, noting that it "fleshes out her [Yuna's] acoustic soul while moving toward dance territory". MTV Iggy's Laura Studarus described the album as a guide towards a twinking blend of different genres.

== Track listing ==
No.	Title	Writer(s)	Producer(s)	Length
1.	"Falling"	Yunalis Zarai; Robin Hannibal	Hannibal	4:06
2.	"Mountains"	Zarai	Jeppe Kjellberg; Tomas Barfod	4:11
3.	"Rescue"	Zarai; Christopher Braide	Braide	3:46
4.	"Lights and Camera"	Zarai; Hannibal	Hannibal	3:34
5.	"Lovely Intermission"	Zarai; Om'Mas Keith	Keith	3:55
6.	"Someone Who Can"	Zarai; Chad Hugo	Hugo	3:40
7.	"I Want You Back"	Zarai; Jenna Andrews	Kjellberg; Barfod	3:32
8.	"Come Back"	Zarai; James Bryan; Lowell Boland	Braide	3:27
9.	"Colors"	Zarai; Braide	Braide	3:39
10.	"I Wanna Go"	Zarai	Michael Einziger	3:42
11.	"Escape"	Zarai; Braide	Braide	3:51
Total length:				41:28

Deluxe edition bonus tracks
No.	Title	Writer(s)	Producer(s)	Length
12.	"Hanging On"	Zarai; Einziger	Einziger	3:52
13.	"Bravest Everything"	Zarai	Kjellberg; Barfod	3:33
14.	"Call Everyone"	Zarai; Keith; Rob Lewis; Michael Uzowuru	Keith	3:39

== Charts ==
Chart (2013)	Peak position
US Heatseekers Albums (Billboard)	27

== Release history ==
Region	Release date	Format	Label
United States	29 October 2013	CD, LP, digital download	Verve Records
