= FMC Music =

Malaysian music company from Kuala Lumpur

- Parent company: Hui Hvang Enterprise Sdn Bhd
- Founded: 1991
- Genre: Various
- Country of origin: Malaysia
- Location: Kuala Lumpur
- Official website: fmcmusic.com.my

Fantasia Music City or FMC is a Malaysian music company from Kuala Lumpur. This company is one of the subsidiaries of Hui Hvang Enterprise Sdn Bhd. The company was established in 1991 as a publishing company that operates as a separate entity for a specific market in Malaysia.

FMC is a member of the Recording Industry Association of Malaysia (RIM) which is a non-profit organization that represents the distribution and publishing of recorded music in Malaysia.

== Artist ==
- Siti Nordiana (1999–2012)
- Elyana (2001–2011)
- Ernie Zakri
- Tajul
- Hujan
- Wany Hasrita
- Yuna
- Haqiem Rusli
- Afieq Shazwan
- Muna Shahirah
- Zack Zakwan
- Tuah Adzmi
- Wani Syaz
- Fareez Fauzi
- Syed Shamim
- Haziq Putera
- Zali Rusli
- Nurul Iman
- Asyraff Khan

== Lofi Girl YouTube copyright claim controversy ==
On 10 July 2022, a music channel on YouTube called Lofi Girl had two of its live music broadcasts suspended due to alleged copyright violations reported by FMC. The account's Twitter account has made a post regarding the report, saying that the copyright claim is false. A few hours later, YouTube's official Twitter account responded to the post and acknowledged its mistake. YouTube removed the claim of copyright infringement and returned the twenty thousand hour long video involved 48 hours later. FMC told news site Malaysiakini that the report of infringement made against Lofi Girl's YouTube channel was the act of hackers using FMC's YouTube channel. The FMC representative claimed that it was only realized on 13 July because its employees were on vacation at the time.

== See also ==
- Lists of record labels
