= UiTM Faculty of Law =

- Type: Public
- Established: 1968
- Dean: Prof. Madya Dr. Nur Ezan Rahmat
- Administrative staff: 100
- Students: 1144
- Location: Shah Alam, Selangor, Malaysia
- Campus: Urban
- Tagline: Cutting Edge Legal Knowledge
- Affiliations: Universiti Teknologi MARA Malaysia

UiTM Faculty of Law is one of the professional graduate faculties of UiTM and is located in Shah Alam, Malaysia. It is among the notable public premier law school in Malaysia.

The current dean of the faculty is Prof. Madya Dr. Nur Ezan Rahmat, who assumed the role in 2024.

The faculty currently consists of some 100 academic staff. It has about 1,144 students studying pre-law, BLS (Hons) and LL.B (Hons).

== History ==
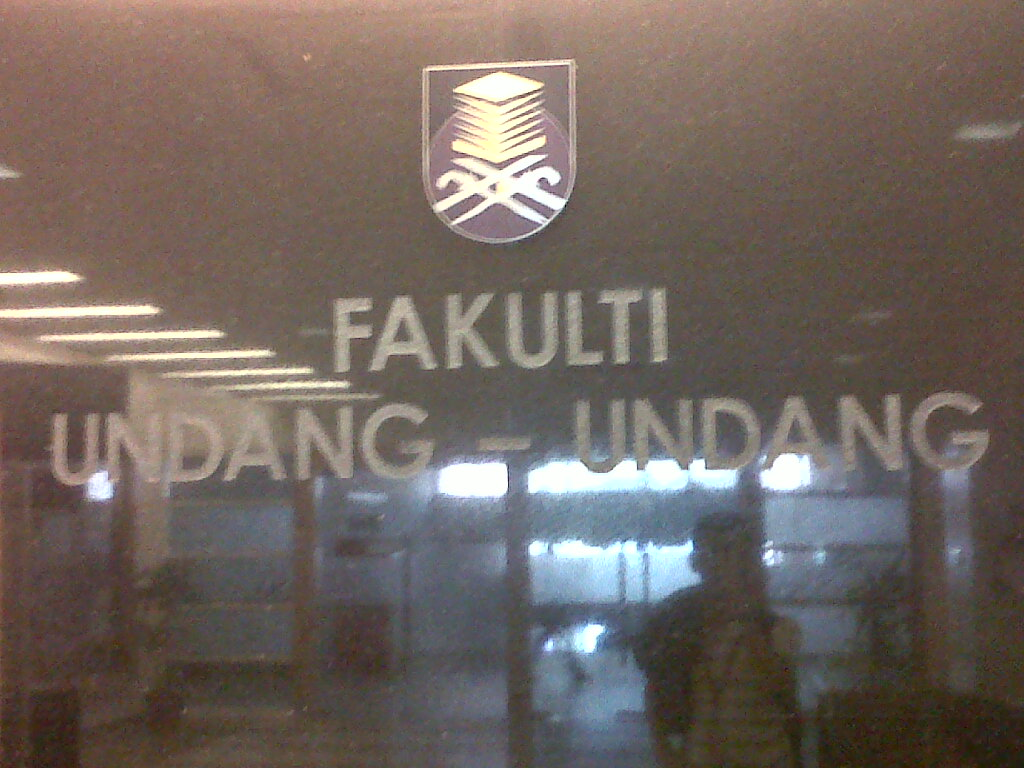
Faculty of Law

The Faculty of Law was founded in 1968. It was formerly known as the Faculty of Administration and Law and before as the School of Administration and Law. It began as a centre offering British external programmes, namely the LL.B(Hons) University of London and the Chartered Institute of Secretaries (now Institute of Chartered Secretaries and Administrators). The only internal programme offered then was the Diploma in Public Administration and Local Government.

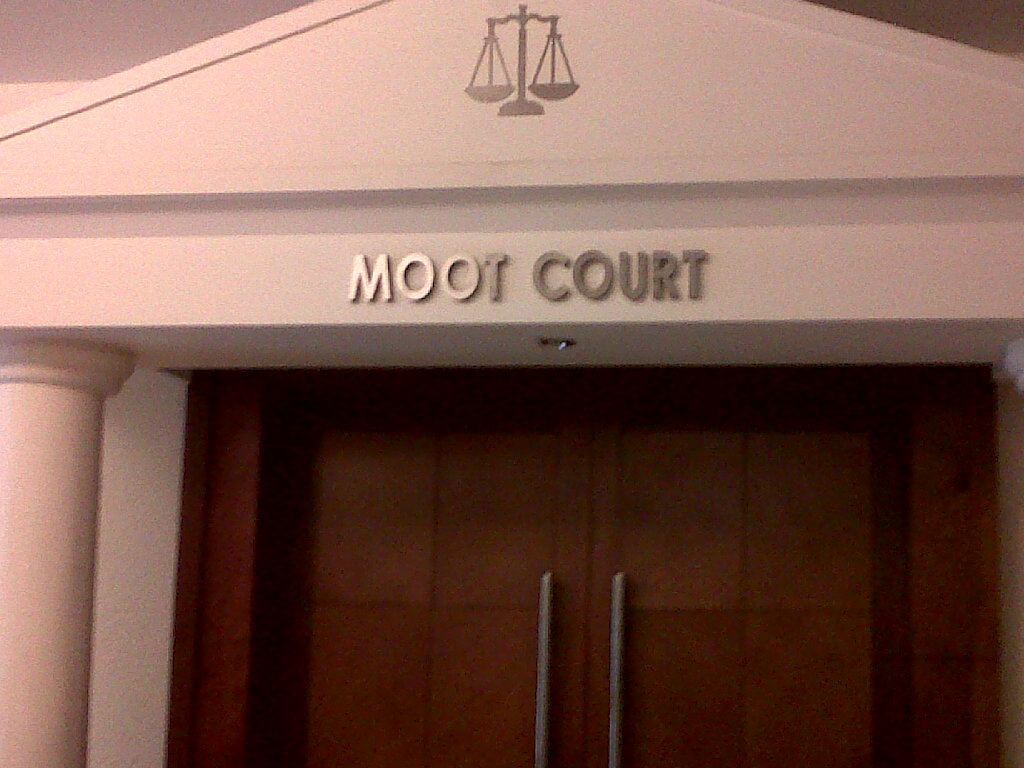
UiTM's Moot Court I

On 14 January 2004, the Faculty of Administration and Law have been separated to two faculties namely the Faculty of Law and the Faculty of Administrative Science and Policy Studies.

== Programmes ==
=== Undergraduate ===
In 1978, the LL.B (Hons) University of London programme was discontinued and replaced by the Diploma in Law (DIL) programme. The DIL programme is equivalent to the LL.B programme offered in British Universities. It is a three-year academic programme based on the structure of British Universities undergraduate law programmes. Unlike most of the British programmes however, the DIL programme at the faculty is conducted on a semester system.

Soon after, the faculty had renamed its programmes and DIL was renamed as the LL.B (general law degree). The LL.B programme, however, was postgraduate programmes (PhD and LL.M. programmes). replaced with the Bachelor of Legal Studies (Hons) or BLS (Hons), which was introduced in 2002.

International Law lecture conducted at Auditorium

In 1982, the faculty introduced a one-year Advanced Diploma in Law (ADIL) programme for graduates of the DIL programme. The ADIL programme is equivalent to a LL.B (Hons) degree and recognised for legal practice. It is a simulatory programme designed to provide professional training for students in preparation for their career in the legal practice as Advocates and Solicitors. ADIL then became the LL.B (Hons). This LL.B (Hons) programme is unique in which it was designed after the Inns of Court in England. The students are put in a simulated legal office environment in which they are designated in firms and given case studies.

The BLS (Hons) programme was discontinued by the faculty in the recent years. Currently, the faculty is only offering the four-years LL.B (Hons) programme for undergraduate while still maintaining the Final-year as the professional training-course. Graduates of this programme are eligible to practice as deputy public prosecutors, federal counsels, parliamentary draftsmen in the attorney general's chambers (AGC), or Judicial Legal Services (JLS) as magistrates, arbitrators and also be admitted as advocates and solicitors.

=== Reference to the Common Bar Course (CBC) ===
Early in March 2011, the Attorney-General announced that the Legal Qualifying Board was considering implementing the Common Bar Course (CBC). Court of Appeal judge Datuk Abdul Wahab Patail is chairing a working group to study its implementation. The CBC would be a 20-month course that would also focus on vocational skills. The CBC model combines the modern legal education approaches in other Commonwealth countries as well as local requirements. There will be modules not commonly seen in other courses to meet specific needs among local graduates, such as the Legal Language and Communication Skills to address the poor command of English and the Practice Management Skills to expose lawyers intending to start their own firm on risk management. Of the five semesters, the first three are full-time studies while the final two are part-time, where students will be pupils at law firms concurrently. It will also feature a Student Law Office programme where the "students-at-law" will get to practice what they have learned in a simulated legal environment, which has been successfully carried out in UiTM Faculty of Law.

== Controversy ==
In 2007, former Dean, Khalid Yusoff, was jailed three months for forgery and cheating in the July 2001 Certificate in Legal Practice examination "master list". In May 2010, he was freed by the Court of Appeal.

== Notable staff ==
- Emeritus Professor. Datuk Dr. Shad Saleem Faruqi
- Adjunct Professor The Right Honourable Chief Justice of Malaysia, Tun Datuk Seri Zaki Tun Azmi

== Alumni ==
- The Right Honourable Tan Sri Datuk Seri Panglima Richard Malanjum, the former chief justice of Malaysia.
- His Excellency, Professor Dr Rahmat Mohamad, secretary general, Asian African Legal Consultative Organization (AALCO), New Delhi, India.
- Puan Hasbi Hassan, Judge of the Kuala Lumpur Criminal Sessions Court
- Datuk Zaid Ibrahim, founder of the largest law firm in Malaysia, president of Parti Kesejahteraan Insan Tanah Air, former senator, former minister in the Prime Minister's Department and former member of the Central Leadership Council (Majlis Pimpinan Pusat), Parti Keadilan Rakyat.
- Yunalis Zarai, Malaysian award-winning artist
- Professor Madya Datin Paduka Saudah Sulaiman, former member of Legal Profession Qualifying Board (LPQB) from 2010 to 2017.
- Mr Ahmad Janatul Firdaus bin Datuk Dr Haji Dzulkarnain', Tokoh Pekerja Negara (Eksekutif) 2019 recipient.
- Shahrulazwad Bin Ismail, author of the book, Music and Film Copyright in Malaysia published by LexisNexis Malaysia.
