= Live Your Life (Yuna song) =

Single by Yuna

from the album Yuna
- Released: January 24, 2012
- Recorded: 2012
- Genre: Indie, folk
- Label: Fader Label
- Songwriter(s): Pharrell Williams, Yuna
- Producer(s): Pharrell Williams

Yuna singles chronology
"Decorate" (2010)	"Live Your Life" (2012)	"Lullabies" (2012)

"Live Your Life" is a song by Malaysian singer Yuna. Produced by renowned artist Pharrell Williams, it was Yuna's first single from her self-titled album, released in January 2012. A version of the song, remixed by MeLo-X, appeared in the video game Grand Theft Auto V on the in-game radio station WorldWide FM.

== Background and release ==
Yuna was discovered in the United States by the Indie-Pop record label and management company. They flew to Malaysia to convince her to sign with them and then proceeded to get her a deal with FADER Label, a record label based in New York, in February 2011. She released her debut US EP, Decorate, in the United States in March the same year.

One of the first few people who expressed interest in her music was Farhan Fadzlishah aka Pa'an (Telephony Delivery), who later became her supporting guitarist. Along the way, Efry Arwis (Lightcraft) helped her with the bass while Adib Azfar handled the drums. Adil Ali (Seven Collar T-shirt) replaced Adib Azfar after the latter quit to concentrate on his drumming role in Oh Chentaku. Yuna performs with her band when she is not active in acoustic gigs.

On 24 April 2012, Yuna's U.S. debut self-titled album was released. Debuting at No.23 on the Pop chart and No.86 on the Top 100 Albums on iTunes, Yuna was also No.23 on Billboard's Heatseekers Chart. Accolades from fans and critics alike, such as Billboard, NPR, Elle, NY Times, Vibe Claire and National Geographic, who raves that her sound is “as fresh, honest and deeply personal as anything by Bon Iver or tUnEyArDs," have been rolling in.

On 24 January 2012, her single "Live Your Life" debuted on iTunes. The track was produced by Grammy Award-winning producer Pharrell Williams.

== Critical reception ==
MTV Iggy described the track as, "polished until it gleams but instead of burying Yuna, it lifts her up. The track has hints that a diva is waiting to shine." A writer for Billboard magazine described the track positively and noted that it was fairing extremely well and would likely chart soon: "25-year-old alterna-pop singer Yuna is gaining traction with her dreamy single "Live Your Life," produced by Pharrell Williams. During the June 11–17 [2012] tracking week, it was among the top 10 most-played songs on SiriusXM's 20 on 20 channel and WLOQ Orlando, Fla., according to Nielsen BDS. On YouTube, its three official clips and a performance on TBS' "Conan" have generated a combined 1 million views. Signed to the FADER label, Yuna wraps a tour with Graffiti6 on June 25 before heading out for dates with David Gray in early July."

== Promotion ==
=== Music video ===
On 16 February 2012, the official music video for "Live Your Life" was released to Yuna's official YouTube/Vevo account.

=== Live performances ===
Yuna performed "Live Your Life" on late-night TV shows Conan and Last Call with Carson Daly. She was featured on the CBS Evening News in a featured profile piece and toured with Graffiti6 with stops at Bonnaroo and Lollapalooza. She also contributed to the Savages soundtrack on the track, Here Comes the Sun.

=== Video games ===
A remix by MeLo-X is heard in Grand Theft Auto V, on the fictional “Worldwide FM” radio station within the game.

== Charts ==
Chart (2012)	Peak position
US Heatseakers (Billboard)	37

== Release history ==
Region	Date	Format	Label
United States	24 January 2012	Digital download	Fader Label
