= Yuna (Malaysian singer) =

Malaysian singer (born 1986)

- يونا
- Born: Yunalis binti Mat Zara'ai; 14 November 1986 (age 40); Alor Setar, Kedah, Malaysia
- Occupations: Singer; songwriter
- Years active: 2006–present
- Spouse: Adam Sinclair (m. 2018)
- Relatives: Ashraf Sinclair (brother-in-law); Aishah Sinclair (sister-in-law); Bunga Citra Lestari (sister-in-law)
- Musical career
- Origin: Subang Jaya, Selangor, Malaysia
- Genres: Pop; R&B
- Instruments: Vocals; guitar
- Labels: Yuna Room; Indie-Pop; Fader Label; Verve; Kamar Seni; Independent Co.; FMC Music; Musica Studios (Indonesia)
- Website: yunamusic.com

Yunalis binti Mat Zara'ai Sinclair (Note: Malay pronunciation: [juˌna.lɪs ˌmat̪̚ ˈza.rai̯]) (née Yunalis binti Mat Zara'ai, Jawi: يوناليس بنت مد ظراعي; born 14 November 1986), known professionally as Yuna, is a Malaysian singer-songwriter. Her initial exposure came through the viral success of her music uploaded to Myspace, which received over one million plays. This online success alerted an indie-pop label/management company to her music, and in early 2011 she signed with the Fader Label. She is best known for her collaboration with Usher on her breakout single "Crush", which peaked at number 3 on the US Billboard Adult R&B chart. From 2010 to 2015, she was the 2nd Most Popular Female Singer in Malaysia with Siti Nurhaliza at first place and Stacy Anam at 3rd place.

Born in Kedah and raised in Perlis and Selangor states to Perakian Malay parents of Buginese descent from Kuala Kangsar and Batu Gajah, she began writing songs at age 14. She soon taught herself to play guitar, and by 2006, in need of a creative outlet while attending law school, performed for an audience for the first time. Yuna made her recorded debut album in Malaysia in 2008 with a self-titled EP, earned five Malaysian Music Awards nominations (the Malaysian equivalent of the Grammy). She took home four trophies, including Best New Artist and Best Song for her breakthrough hit "Dan Sebenarnya".

The Decorate (EP) followed two years later. Decorate included the viral hit "Rocket," which won raves from Billboard magazine, indie rock radio station KEXP, and hip-hop mogul Russell Simmons, as well as a feature in Spin's "Eight Bands You Need to Hear Now". For her performances, Yuna was nominated as one of MTV's Iggy's Best New Bands in the World in 2011, and she marked the occasion by playing at the historic MTV Studios.

The 2012 single "Live Your Life", produced by Pharrell Williams, was a preamble to her self-titled full-length debut, which arrived that April. That summer, Yuna appeared at Lollapalooza. In 2013, Yuna returned with the album Nocturnal, featuring the single "Falling". In February 2016, Yuna previewed her third album with the release of "Places to Go", a single produced by hip-hop artist DJ Premier. The full album, Chapters, was released three months later.

In December 2016, Chapters broke into the Top 10 of the Billboard Best R&B Albums of 2016: Critic's Pick; Chapters ranked at number 7. Yuna received an award for the Most Successful Malaysian Singer from the Malaysian Book Of Records. Chapters was also nominated in the Top 20 Best R&B Albums of 2016 by Rolling Stone magazine. Yuna performed as a special guest at the 2016 Soul Train Music Awards.

In May 2017, Yuna became the first singer from Asia to be nominated for a BET Award; Yuna received a nomination for the BET Centric Award for "Crush", her duet single with Usher.

== Early life ==
Yuna grew up in Subang Jaya, Selangor and Kangar, Perlis, in Malaysia.

=== Education ===
Yuna attended SK Seafield, SMK Derma, Kangar, Perlis and SMK USJ 4 Subang Jaya, Selangor. After that, Yuna attended Universiti Teknologi MARA in Shah Alam, where she studied legal studies at its Faculty of Law. In 2009, she graduated with a Bachelor of Legal Studies (Hons.) degree.

== Career ==
=== 2001–2010: Beginnings and early success ===
Yuna began writing her own songs when she was 14 years old and began performing at age 19 after she learned how to play guitar. She has performed in numerous acoustic shows and events in many parts of Malaysia since 2006. The same year, she auditioned for the first season of One in a Million, making it to the top 40 round before she was eliminated from the competition.

In October 2008, she released her second EP, the self-titled Yuna. Its single "Deeper Conversation" became a hit in Malaysia. Her meteoric rise in the Malaysian indie music scene was helped by the strong following she gained on Myspace. Her first studio album, Decorate, was released in July 2010 under her indie label Yuna Room Records.

=== 2011–2013: Early international breakthrough ===
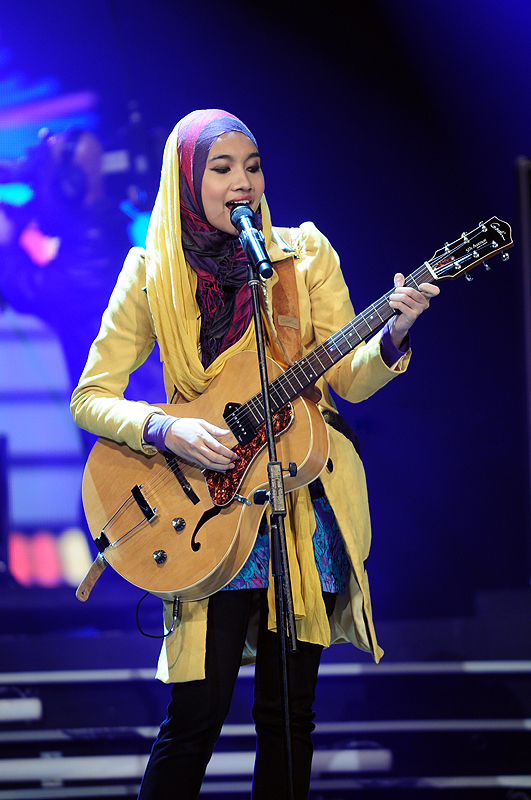
Yuna in 2010

Yuna was eventually discovered in the US by the indie-Pop record label and management company. They flew out to Malaysia to convince her to sign with them and then proceeded to get her a deal with Fader Label, a record label based in New York, in February 2011. She released her debut US EP, Decorate, in the United States in March 2011.

On 24 January 2012, her single "Live Your Life" debuted on iTunes. The track was produced by Grammy Award-winning producer, Pharrell Williams. MTV Iggy described the track as, "polished until it gleams but instead of burying Yuna, it lifts her up. The track has hinted that a diva is waiting to shine." On 16 February, the official music video for "Live Your Life" was released. On 24 April 2012, Yuna's US debut self-titled album was released. Debuting at No. 23 on the Pop chart and No. 86 on the Top 100 Albums on iTunes, Yuna was also No. 23 on Billboard's Heatseekers Chart. Accolades from fans and critics alike, such as Billboard, NPR, Elle, The New York Times, Vibe Claire and National Geographic, who stated that her sound is "as fresh, honest and deeply personal as anything by Bon Iver or Tune-Yards," have been rolling in.

Yuna performed "Live Your Life" on late-night TV shows Conan and Last Call with Carson Daly. She was featured on the CBS Evening News in a featured profile piece and toured with Graffiti6 with stops at Bonnaroo and Lollapalooza. She also contributed to the Savages soundtrack on the track, Here Comes the Sun. Yuna also performed as part of the Lollapalooza 2012 line up.

Yuna was the first runner-up of MTV Iggy's Best New Bands in the World. She performed at the historic MTV Studios in Times Square, New York singing "Decorate", "Come As You Are", "Lullabies" which is produced by Chris Braide and her new single "Live Your Life", which is produced by Pharrell Williams of N.E.R.D.

Yuna recently signed with Verve Music Group. Multiple Grammy-winning producer David Foster, who heads the creative operations of Verve, tweeted: "I'm really excited about the next hot artist to join Verve Music. Stay tuned and keep an eye out for Yuna in 2013". She also made the Heatseekers Album chart on Billboard with "Live Your Life".

=== 2013–2015: Nocturnal ===
Yuna released her second international album, Nocturnal on 29 October 2013 by Verve Records. "I Want You Back" featuring Vietnamese rapper, Derez aired on "Love & Hip Hop: New York" 20 January 2014. On 9 January 2014, Yuna graced the Jimmy Kimmel Live! studios, promoting her new album, Nocturnal. She performed the singles "Falling" and "Rescue" with assistance from a live band.

In December 2014, Yuna released the song "Broke Her" as a single. It features a sample of Drake's 0 to 100.

On 31 January 2015, Yuna performed in the closing ceremony of 2015 AFC Asian Cup. She has been appointed as Malaysia's tourism adviser to boost tourist arrivals in the country along with Dato' Siti Nurhaliza and Datuk Jimmy Choo Yeang Keat in June of the same year.

Yuna recorded the song Strawberry Letter 23 by singer Shuggie Otis used in a commercial for Swedish fashion retailer H&M starring Ukrainian-Canadian model Daria Werbowy that aired in March 2015.

=== 2016–2018: Chapters ===
On 20 May 2016, Yuna released her latest album Chapters through Verve Records. The album features the collaboration from Usher, Jhené Aiko and DJ Premier. As of December 2016, the album had been selected by Billboard in 7th place of its 2016 Critics' Picks for Best R&B Album. Yuna receive recognition from The Malaysia Book of Records for The First R&B Album Listed In Top 10 Billboard Charts In The United States.

On 25 July 2017, Yuna took to the Late Night with Seth Meyers stage at NBC Studios to promote her album and performs "Used To Love You" from Chapters. The Jhené Aiko-assisted track was instead backed by an incredible full band complete with violins as part of a small string section.

In December 2018, Yuna created history when gathering a streaming total of about 36 million in Spotify throughout 2018.

=== 2019–2021: Rouge, directional debut and RIAA certification ===
Yuna returned to finish up work for her fourth international album after taking a short break following her wedding. She further described the new direction for the upcoming album, which will be the "opposite" of her previous record, "Chapters". In an interview with Singapore's Straits Times, Yuna teased that the new album will also feature guest stars; however, no names were disclosed. She also hinted that a new song off the upcoming album would be released in March 2019. Yuna described the whole process of making the new album as "happier", with more freedom compared to her previous releases.

In a detailed interview with Riff Magazine on 25 February 2019, Yuna described that the upcoming album was in the process of finishing up and that it brings everything full circle by going back to the music her father listened to when she was young. "It's still Yuna, it's pop music, but it's pop and R&B. For this album, we wanted to bring back the feel of old records, old vinyl."

Yuna released "Forevermore" on 5 April 2019. In a Star2 article, she said that the song "is about growing up in a small town and coming from a small country and how that environment made me strive to be the best that I can be." For the video she had enlisted her husband Adam Sinclair who is a director, and they shot the video entirely in Malaysia, mostly in Kuala Lumpur and Perlis. "Forevermore" debuted at number one on Malaysia's RIM Domestic Chart on 11 April 2019, her first number-one since the reintroduction of the official chart in 2017.

Apart from making her new album, Yuna ventured into the directing scene. She made her directional debut in October 2018 for Malaysia's duo, Hani & Zue's "Alone". Yuna later directed another video for the duo, "Aku dan Laguku".

On 17 April 2019, Yuna earned her very first RIAA certification when her song "Crush" logged a gold certified sales of 500,000 copies. This feat was achieved three years after the song was released.

Yuna released her second promotional single from her upcoming album, "Blank Marquee" featuring American rapper, G-Eazy on 16 May 2019. The music video was shot in Kuala Lumpur, featuring Malaysian actor, Amerul Affendi and also directed by Sinclair. On the same day, Yuna revealed several titles and lyrics from her new album Rouge, which was released on 12 July 2019.

=== 2022–present:Y5 ===
On 4 March 2022, announced that her fifth international album, Y5, would be released in five installations: Y1, Y2, Y3, Y4, and Y5.

Yuna's 2011 track "Someone Out Of Town" gained a resurgence in popularity in 2026 after videos on social media platform TikTok used the song.

== Artistry ==
=== Musical style ===
Yuna possesses a light lyric soprano voice. She once described her music as "a cross between Mary Poppins and Coldplay". She explains about this characterization of her musical style, "I can't believe people still hold onto that! It was a quote that I had on, like, my Myspace music page seven years ago. But yeah, what I meant to say is I like to incorporate a lot of different genres in my music, and, you know, having a sense of honesty and sincerity in the lyrics as well. But I'm still pop at the same time."

=== Influences ===
Yuna has cited Coldplay, Bob Dylan, and Feist as influences, having been introduced to them by her father. Growing up in Malaysia, she listened to a lot of The Cardigans, Fiona Apple, and Garbage.

=== Collaborations ===
Throughout her music career, Yuna has collaborated with many world-renowned artists, such as Usher, Tyler, the Creator, Epik High, G-Eazy, Jay Park, Jhené Aiko, KYLE, Little Simz, and MIYAVI.

== Businesses ==
Yuna co-owns a women's clothes boutique, IAMJETFUEL, in Subang Jaya, Selangor. In 2014, she re-opened the shop with a new name, 'November Culture', which is also situated in Subang Jaya with a worldwide online presence. 14Nov by Yuna Zarai (brand name) are clothes and scarves that are designed by Yuna herself. She started introducing this brand in the US by promoting it in fashion shows (Fashion Fighting Famine or #FFFShow) in California. Besides that, she also opened a pop store in New York as well as Los Angeles. Recently, she has launched her new collaboration with Malaysian designer, Hatta Dolmat.

On 1 May 2018, Yuna announced on her Instagram account that the November Culture boutique had ceased operations.

== Personal life ==
=== Relationships ===
Yuna has been married to Malaysian director, Adam Sinclair, himself the younger brother of actor Ashraf Sinclair and actress/presenter Aishah Sinclair, since 2018.

=== Religion ===
Yuna is a Muslim. Speaking on her hijab, she stated:

When I first started playing music, I was already covered ... wearing headscarves. And, like, normally, people would expect you to change, toss this part of your life away so that you could be a pop star. But I just wanted to make music, not really be a "pop star" pop star. And there's always people who wouldn't necessarily agree with what I'm doing right now. But I'm really happy with where I am right now, you know. I'm a Muslim. I don't try to hide it. I'm also a girl who loves music. And I don't try to hide that as well.

=== Sexual harassment ===
In March 2018, Yuna revealed in a statement on Twitter that for the previous six months she was the victim of sexual harassment and revealed that the perpetrator had been sending threatening comments to her Instagram account.

== In popular culture ==
Yuna covered "Here Comes the Sun" by the Beatles for the 2012 film, Savages. The song was featured during the ending credits. "Tourist" was featured as part of the soundtrack in season 1 of a US TV series, Arrow. Her song "Favourite Thing" was featured in another US TV series Pretty Little Liars. She also recorded a song in collaboration with Adam Young of Owl City called "Shine Your Way" for the soundtrack of the animated film The Croods. The film was released by DreamWorks Animation in March 2013. Another Yuna song "Lullabies" was also featured in 90210, the reboot of Beverly Hills, 90210. This song was also featured in Being Mary Jane. Yuna also had her song "Lights and Camera" featured on an episode of the third season of the US reality show Love & Hip Hop: Atlanta. "Lights and Camera" was also used as one of the soundtracks from Beyond the Lights. A remix of the song was released on 17 November 2014 that features appearance from an American rapper, G-Eazy. "All I Do", the last track of her third international album, Chapters, has been chosen as the soundtrack for the pilot episode in season 13 of the popular American medical drama TV series, Grey's Anatomy. The song was aired on 22 September 2016 on the ABC channel in the United States. A remix version of "Live Your Life" by MeLo-X appeared on the in-game radio station WorldWide FM in the video game Grand Theft Auto V.

Yuna's version of A Whole New World from the 1992 Disney film Aladdin, which was also sung by Peabo Bryson and Celine Dion, featured in the Deluxe Edition (bonus track) for the album We Love Disney (2015 compilation album). Beside Yuna, a number of other artists such as Ariana Grande, Ne-Yo, Jessie J, Jason Derulo, Gwen Stefani, Fall Out Boy, and Tori Kelly were also involved in the album published by David Foster.

The Adventure Club's remix of her song "Lullabies" was also featured as in the 2016 video game Steep. Yuna was also featured in the Malaysian version of KakaoTalk advertisement, released in Malay, English, and Chinese language. Her 2011 single "Someone Out of Town" was sampled by late rapper XXXTentacion on his song "Let's Pretend We're Numb." In 2022, her single "Lights and Camera" can be heard in the CNN commercial for "Reframed - Marilyn Monroe".

== Discography ==
International studio albums

- Yuna (2012)
- Nocturnal (2013)
- Chapters (2016)
- Rouge (2019)
- Y5 (2022)

International EPs

- Decorate (2011)
- Sixth Street (2013)
- Y1 (2022)
- Y2 (2022)
- Y3 (2022)
- Y4 (2022)
- Battle (2023)
- Wasting Away (2024)

Malaysian albums

- Decorate (2010)
- Terukir di Bintang (2012)
- Material (2015)
- Masih Yuna EP (2023)
- Senjata (2026)

== Tours ==
- Summer Tour (2012)
- Nocturnal Tour (2014)
- Chapters Tour (2016)
- Rouge Tour (2019)
- Yunaverse/Asia Tour (2023)
