= Chapters (Yuna album) =

Studio album by Yuna
- Released: May 20, 2016
- Recorded: 2015–2016
- Studio: Westlake Recording Studios · Silent Sound Studios · The Ship · 4220 Studios · Fisticuffs Gym · Verve Studios · The Village
- Genre: Pop; R&B
- Length: 39:40
- Label: Verve
- Producer: Fisticuffs (exec.); Ben Willis (exec.); Robin Hannibal; Paul Salva; Jochem van der Saag; David Foster; DJ Premier

Yuna chronology
Nocturnal (2013)	Chapters (2016)	Rouge (2019)

Singles from Chapters
- 1. "Crush" Released: February 29, 2016; 2. "Lanes" Released: May 7, 2016; 3. "Mannequin" Released: September 9, 2016; 4. "Poor Heart" Released: October 27, 2016; 5. "Best Love" Released: January 9, 2017; 6. "Unrequited Love" Released: February 8, 2017

Chapters is the third international studio album (sixth overall release) by Malaysian singer-songwriter, Yuna released on May 20, 2016, through Verve Records. The album is the follow-up to her second international studio album Nocturnal (2013), and features guest appearances from Usher and Jhené Aiko. Chapters made its way to the top 10 of the Billboard's Best R&B Albums of 2016: Critic's Picks and Rolling Stone's 20 Best R&B Albums of 2016.

One of the songs in the album, "All I Do" was chosen as the soundtrack for the pilot episode of 13th season of Grey's Anatomy.

== Background ==
Prior to the album's release, it has been reported in October 2015 that Yuna's upcoming studio album which is 90 percent to completed and originally to be released by February 2016. In an exclusive interview with Utusan Malaysia, Yuna said about the album:

"Even there are changes among them are in terms of musical style, I convinced that music fans will hear the songs and they will know that is Yuna,".

Yuna revealed the album title, Chapters in an interview with The Fader on February 19, 2016, and announced May 20 as the album's release date.

== Singles ==
A total of six singles were released during 2016 and 2017 to support the album. The lead single, "Crush" featuring Usher was released on February 29, 2016. The song debuted at No. 24 and has peaked at No. 1 on the Malaysia Music Weekly, the first and only single to reach the top of the list in one week. As of March 9, the song peaked on the singles list at No. 12 (Indonesia), No. 17 (Singapore), No. 6 (Cambodia) and No. 3 (United States R&B Billboard). "Crush" was the first song on Yuna to receive gold certification from RIAA with certified sales of 500,000 copies, in April 2019, three years following its release.

"Lanes" was in May 2016 the second single released. "Mannequin" and "Poor Heart" were released in September and October respectively.

The fifth single, "Best Love" was released in January 2017 to a moderate success, peaking higher than "Crush" at No. 2 on the Billboard Adult R&B Songs.

"Unrequited Love" was released in February 2017 as the sixth and final single of Chapters.

=== Promotional singles ===
The first promotional single, "Places To Go" in collaboration with DJ Premier was released on February 20, 2016.

== Critical reception ==
Gail Mitchell from Billboard wrote that this compelling album proves through such Sade-channeling selections as "Best Love" and "Unrequited Love". Rolling Stone opined that Chapters, segmented like pages torn from a diary, than its occasional starry cameos or production from alt-R&B heavyweight Robin Hannibal. Her emotional sincerity is underlined by her quiet yet insistent voice, and she often sounds like she is whispering as she lyrically dismantles her ex-lover's arguments. Much of Chapters finds her falling out of love, but there are a few happy moments in this beautifully broken valentine. Writing for Star2.com, Angelin Yeoh praises Yuna for her ability to turn heartbreaks into stellar numbers in Chapters. Where as Pulse undoubtedly louded "Chapters" as Yuna's best work ever as the album perfectly highlights her vocal maturity. Sputnikmusic praised for the album productions, stating "It has to be said that Chapters’ spacious production does wonders for Yuna's tender soprano, and when the two elements manage to combine over an honest-to-goodness number, such as in the case of "All I Do" and “Too Close”, the result is good enough to make heartbreak contemporaries Adele and Jessie Ware blush." However on the negative side described the bulk of the material she's working with, "unfortunately, is on a lower level."

Professional ratings
Review scores
Source	Rating
Idolator	4/5 stars
Sputnikmusic	3/5 stars
Pop Magazine	4/5 stars
Star2.com	8/10 stars
Spin	8/10 stars
Exclaim!	7/10 stars
PressPLAY OK	3/5 stars
Spin or Bin Music	3.5/5 stars

=== Year-end lists ===
Publication	Accolade	Rank
Billboard	Billboard's Best R&B Albums of 2016: Critic's Picks	7
Rolling Stone	20 Best R&B Albums of 2016	13

== Certifications ==
Region	Single	Certification	Certified unit/sales
United States RIAA	"Crush" feat Usher	Gold	500,000

== Track listing ==
Chapters – Standard edition
No.	Title	Writer(s)	Producer(s)	Length
1.	"Mannequin"	Yunalis Zarai; Mac Robinson; Brian Warfield	Fisticuffs	3:35
2.	"Lanes"	Zarai; Robin Braun; Paul Salva	Robin Hannibal; Paul Salva	3:14
3.	"Crush" (featuring Usher)	Zarai; Robinson; Warfield; Usher Raymond IV	Fisticuffs	4:03
4.	"Unrequited Love"	Zarai; Robinson; Warfield	Fisticuffs	4:08
5.	"Best Love"	Yunalis Zarai; Drew Barrymore; Jamshied Sharifi; Charlotte Church; Robin Braun; Itai Shapira; Joel Van Dijk	Hannibal	4:51
6.	"Used to Love You" (featuring Jhené Aiko)	Zarai; Robinson; Warfield; Jhené Chilombo	Fisticuffs	3:29
7.	"Too Close"	Zarai; Braun	Hannibal	4:13
8.	"Best of Me"	Zarai; Braun; Salva	Hannibal; Salva	3:53
9.	"Your Love"	Zarai; Robinson; Warfield	Salva; Hannibal	4:38
10.	"All I Do"	Zarai; David Foster	David Foster; Jochem Van Der Saag	3:36
Total length:				39:40

Chapters – Deluxe edition (bonus tracks)
No.	Title	Writer(s)	Producer(s)	Length
11.	"Places to Go"	Zarai; Christopher Martin; Eric Barrier; William Griffin	DJ Premier	3:33
12.	"Poor Heart"	Zarai; Robinson; Warfield	Fisticuffs	4:16
13.	"Time"	Zarai; Robinson; Warfield	Fisticuffs	3:26
Total length:				50:55

== Personnel ==
Credits adapted from Chapters booklet liner notes and Discogs.

- A&R – Ben Willis (2), Mike Rittberg (2)
- A&R [Coordinator, Administrator] – Evelyn Morgan
- Art direction – Yuna
- Design – Made In Katana
- Edited by [Additional] – Robert Castillo (2) (tracks: 2, 5, 8)
- Engineer – Aaron Espinoza (tracks: 5, 7), Bryan Todd (tracks: 10), Christian Plata (tracks: 1, 3, 4, 6, 9, 12, 13), Fisticuffs (2) (tracks: 1, 3, 4, 6, 9, 12, 13), Jochem van der Saag (tracks: 10), Jorge Vivo (tracks: 10)
- Executive producer – Ben Willis (2), Fisticuffs (2)
- Legal – Peter Rosenthal, Esq., Ritholz Levy
- Management – Benjamin Willis*, Indie-Pop
- Mastered By – Chris Gehringer
- Mixed by – DJ Premier (tracks: 11), Erik Madrid (tracks: 1 to 8, 12, 13), Jochem van der Saag (tracks: 9, 10)
- Mixed by [Assistant] – Ellis Tucker (tracks: 1 to 8, 12, 13)
- Photography by – Aris Jerome
- Product manager – Holly Adams
- Production manager – Kam Sangha
- Recorded by – Parks (8) (tracks: 11), King Of Chill* (tracks: 11)
- Recorded by [Jhené Aiko Vocals] – Jim Caruana (tracks: 6)
- Recorded by [Usher Vocals] – Mark "Exit" Goodchild (tracks: 3)
- Recorded by [Vocals] – Alex Williams (9) (tracks: 11)
- Technician [Vocal Production, Assistant] – Kory Aaron (tracks: 3)
- Technician [Vocal Production] – Natural (10) (tracks: 3)
- Tracking By [Vocals] – Tucker Robinson (tracks: 2, 5, 7, 8)
- Vocals – Yuna
- Phonographic Copyright (p) – The Verve Music Group
- Copyright (c) – The Verve Music Group
- Manufactured By – Universal Music Distribution
- Distributed By – Universal Music Distribution
- Mastered At – Sterling Sound

== Charts ==
Chart (2016)	Peak position
US Heatseekers Albums (Billboard)	5
US Top R&B/Hip-Hop Albums (Billboard)	16

== Release history ==
Region	Release date	Format	Label
United States	20 May 2016	CD, LP, digital download	Verve Records
