= Crush (Yuna song) =

Single by Yuna featuring Usher

from the album Chapters
- Released: February 29, 2016
- Recorded: 2016
- Genre: R&B
- Length: 4:03
- Label: Verve
- Songwriters: Yunalis Mat Zara'ai; Mac Robinson; Brian Warfield; Usher Raymond IV
- Producer: Fisticuffs

Yuna singles chronology
"Broke Her" (2014)	"Crush" (2016)	"Lanes" (2016)

Usher singles chronology
"Chains" (2015)	"Crush" (2016)	"No Limit" (2016)

Music video
- "Crush" on YouTube

"Crush" is a song by Malaysian artist Yuna featuring American singer Usher. It was released as a single from Yuna's third international studio album, Chapters (2016).

== Commercial performance ==
The song peaked at No. 3 on the Adult R&B Songs chart. "Crush" was Yuna's first RIAA certified gold song with sales of 500,000 copies by April 2019, three years after it was released.

== Music video ==
The official music video for "Crush" was released on April 26, 2016 on Yuna's official Vevo account. Since its release, it has gained over 100 million views. The black and white music video itself features Yuna and Usher singing in front of Los Angeles City Hall.

== Chart performance ==
Chart (2016)	Peak position
Malaysia (RIM)	1
US Hot R&B Songs (Billboard)	21
US Adult R&B Songs (Billboard)	3
US R&B/Hip-Hop Airplay (Billboard)	22

== Awards and recognition ==
Year	Award	Category	Nominated work	Result
2017	BET Awards	Centric Award	"Crush" (feat. Usher)	Lost to Solange's "Cranes in the Sky".

== Certifications ==
Region	Certification	Certified units/sales
United States (RIAA)	Gold	500,000^{‡}
^{‡} Sales+streaming figures based on certification alone.
