= Yuna (album) =

Studio album by Yuna
- Released: April 24, 2012
- Genre: Pop rock
- Length: 46:42
- Label: Fader Label
- Producer: Yunalis Mat Zara'ai; Chris Braide; Andre Harris; James Bryan; Pharrell Williams; Guy Sebastian

Yuna chronology
Decorate (EP) (2011)	Yuna (2012)	Sixth Street (EP) (2013)

Singles from Yuna
- 1. "Live Your Life" Released: January 24, 2012

Yuna is a third studio album by Malaysian singer-songwriter Yuna. It is her first international album to be released in the United States. The album employs the production of Pharrell Williams and Andre Harris. It also draws from genres like pop rock, adult alternative and indie rock. It mainly received positive responses after its release. It charted at number 19 on the Heatseekers Albums chart.

== Track listing ==
No.	Title	Writer(s)	Producer(s)	Length
1.	"Lullabies"	Yunalis Zarai; Chris Braide	Braide	4:06
2.	"Favourite Thing"	Zarai; Braide	Braide	3:40
3.	"Remember My Name"	Zarai; Andre Harris	Harris; Yuna	3:37
4.	"Decorate"	Zarai; Braide	Braide	3:45
5.	"Planes"	Zarai; James Bryan McCollum	McCollum	3:01
6.	"Bad Idea"	Zarai; Pharrell Williams	Williams	3:22
7.	"Island"	Zarai; Braide	Braide	4:10
8.	"Tourist"	Zarai; McCollum	McCollum	3:46
9.	"Fading Flower"	Zarai; Guy Sebastian; Harris	Harris; Sebastian	3:17
10.	"See You Go"	Zarai; Williams; Chrisette Payne	Williams	4:07
11.	"Stay"	Zarai; Harris	Harris	3:23
12.	"Live Your Life"	Zarai; Williams	Williams	3:13
13.	"Loud Noises"	Zarai; Braide	Braide	3:22

== Charts ==
Chart (2012)	Peak position
Danish Albums (Hitlisten)	32
US Heatseekers Albums (Billboard)	19
