= Scary Hours 2 =

EP by Drake
- Released: March 5, 2021
- Genre: Hip-hop; trap
- Length: 12:33
- Label: OVO; Republic
- Producer: 40; Austin Powerz; Boi-1da; Cardo; Dez Wright; FnZ; Keanu Beats; Maneesh; Supah Mario

Drake chronology
Dark Lane Demo Tapes (2020)	Scary Hours 2 (2021)	Certified Lover Boy (2021)

Singles from Scary Hours 2
- 1. "What's Next" Released: March 5, 2021

Professional ratings
Review scores
Source	Rating
AllMusic	3.5/5 stars

Scary Hours 2 is the fourth extended play by Canadian rapper Drake and a sequel to his second extended play Scary Hours (2018). It was released on March 5, 2021, and features guest appearances from American rappers Lil Baby and Rick Ross. The only single, "What's Next", was released alongside the EP with an accompanying music video. A sequel, For All the Dogs Scary Hours Edition, was released on November 17, 2023.

== Background ==
In January 2021, Drake announced that his upcoming sixth studio album Certified Lover Boy would be delayed until later in 2021. Two months later, Scary Hours 2 was announced a day prior to release on Drake's social media platforms.

== Commercial performance ==
The multi-single managed to chart on three charts, the Austrian, Italian, and German album charts, at number 10, 54 and 80, respectively.

"What's Next" debuted atop the US Billboard Hot 100 on the chart dated March 20, 2021, becoming his eighth song to top the chart. The remaining tracks from the EP, "Wants and Needs" featuring Lil Baby and "Lemon Pepper Freestyle" featuring Rick Ross debuted at number two and three, respectively, thus making him the first artist in history to have three songs debut in the top 3 of the Billboard Hot 100 in the same week. "Lemon Pepper Freestyle" is also Rick Ross's highest charting song to date.

== Track listing ==
Scary Hours 2 track listing
No.	Title	Writer(s)	Producer(s)	Length
1.	"What's Next"	Aubrey Graham; Jonathan Priester; Maneesh Bidaye	Supah Mario; Maneesh^{[b]}	2:58
2.	"Wants and Needs" (featuring Lil Baby)	Graham; Dominique Jones; Ronald LaTour Jr.; Dylan Cleary-Krell; Noah Shebib	Cardo; Dez Wright; 40^{[a]}	3:14
3.	"Lemon Pepper Freestyle" (featuring Rick Ross)	Graham; William Roberts; Matthew Samuels; Cecilie Maja; Robin Hannibal	Boi-1da; Austin Powerz; FnZ; Keanu Beats	6:21
Total length:				12:33

=== Notes ===
- ^{^[a]} signifies a co-producer
- ^{^[b]} signifies an additional producer

=== Sample credits ===
- "Lemon Pepper Freestyle" contains a sample of "Pressure", written by Cecilie Maja and Robin Hannibal, as performed by Quadron.

== Credits and personnel ==
- Drake – vocals
- Lil Baby – vocals (2)
- Rick Ross – vocals (3)
- 40 – mixing
- Noel Cadastre – record engineering
- Chris Athens – mastering (3)

== Charts ==
Chart performance for Scary Hours 2
Chart (2021)	Peak position
Austrian Albums (Ö3 Austria)	10
German Albums (Offizielle Top 100)	80
Italian Albums (FIMI)	54
