= (Not) The Love of My Life =

Single by Yuna

from the album Rouge
- Released: 22 August 2019
- Genre: Pop
- Length: 3:37
- Label: Verve Forecast Records, UMG Recordings
- Songwriters: Yunalis Zarai, Alexandra Govere, Robin Hannibal
- Producer: Robin Hannibal

Yuna singles chronology
"Pink Youth" (2019)	"(Not) The Love of My Life" (2019)	"Castaway" (2019)

Music video
- "(Not) The Love of My Life" on YouTube

"(Not) The Love of My Life" is a song by Malaysian singer-songwriter Yuna, released as the fourth single from her fourth international album (her seventh overall), Rouge. The song was co-written by Yuna, Alexandra Govere and Robin Hannibal and released on August 22, 2019 by Verve Forecast Records. It samples the 1981 song, "Mensaje De Dios (Message from God)" by jazz pianist Rodney Franklin.

== Music video ==
""(Not) The Love Of My Life" tells a story of a bride in the midst of getting ready for her wedding but is second guessing her decision to settle down. I went back to Malaysia and wanted to collaborate again with my friend and traditional Indian choreographer Harshini Sukumaran whom I've worked with in the "Forevermore" music video.

— Yuna on the making of "(Not) The Love Of My Life"

The official video for "(Not) The Love of My Life" was premiered on Yuna's official YouTube and Vevo account on 22 August 2019. The video features Bollywood-theme with Yuna herself served as a director. In the video, Yuna wears Indian costumes and traditional folk jewelry from head to toe. The video also marks Yuna's second collaboration with Indian traditional choreographer, Harshini Sukumaran after "Forevermore".

== Critical reception ==
In a retrospective review of Rouge, Skylar de Paul from The Daily Californian said: "(Not) The Love of My Life" continues following Yuna's emotional growth. Each lyric is enunciated like spoken word, showing she wants to make her message clear: The person she's singing to is not really "the one"". Adriane Pontecorvo from PopMatters described the song "has gorgeous color to its melody, in no small part due to Yuna's dulcet scorn".

== Release history ==
Country	Date	Format	Label
Malaysia	22 August 2019	Digital download Digital streaming	Verve Forecast Records
