= Lemon Pepper Freestyle =

2021 song by Drake featuring Rick Ross

Song by Drake featuring Rick Ross

from the EP Scary Hours 2
- Released: March 5, 2021
- Length: 6:21
- Label: Republic; OVO
- Songwriters: Aubrey Graham; William Roberts II; Matthew Samuels; Cecilie Maja; Robin Hannibal
- Producers: Boi-1da; Austin Powerz; FnZ (un-co.); Keanu Beats (un-co.)

"Lemon Pepper Freestyle" is a song by Canadian rapper Drake, featuring vocals from American rapper Rick Ross. It was released as the third out of three tracks from Drake's fourth extended play, Scary Hours 2, through Republic Records and OVO Sound, on March 5, 2021. The two artists wrote the song alongside Boi-1da, Coco O., and Robin Hannibal, while it was produced by Boi-1da and Austin Powerz with uncredited co-production from FnZ and Keanu Beats. It contains a sample from "Pressure" by Quadron.

== Background ==
Before the song was released, Drake and Rick Ross had over fifteen collaborations, including two 2019 singles: "Money in the Grave" by Drake and "Gold Roses" by Rick Ross.

Drake reflects on "what it's like going to parent-teacher conferences as a superstar". The song has inspired various people, American professional basketball player Giannis Antetokounmpo, from the Milwaukee Bucks posted a video of himself eating lemon pepper wings. American rapper Wynne freestyled over the instrumental of the song.

== Critical reception ==
Jordan Rose of Variety felt that the song has Rick Ross "stepping aside after the opening to let Drake go an hour on the beat and deliver one of his most mature verses in recent memory" and Drake "is beyond waxing poetic solely about the things he still wants".

== Personnel ==
Credits adapted from Tidal.

- Drake – lead vocals, songwriting
- Rick Ross – featured vocals, songwriting
- Boi-1da – production, songwriting
- Coco O. – songwriting
- Robin Hannibal – songwriting
- Austin Powerz – production
- FnZ – uncredited co-production
- Keanu Beats – uncredited co-production
- 40 – co-production, mixing, studio personnel
- Chris Athens – mastering, studio personnel
- Noel Cadastre – recording, engineering, studio personnel

== Charts ==
=== Weekly charts ===
Chart performance for "Lemon Pepper Freestyle"
Chart (2021)	Peak position
Australia (ARIA)	26
Austria (Ö3 Austria Top 40)	56
Canada Hot 100 (Billboard)	3
France (SNEP)	118
Germany (GfK)	76
Global 200 (Billboard)	4
Ireland (IRMA)	11
Lithuania (AGATA)	55
Netherlands (Single Top 100)	51
New Zealand (Recorded Music NZ)	36
Portugal (AFP)	39
Switzerland (Schweizer Hitparade)	32
UK Singles (OCC)	6
UK Hip Hop/R&B (OCC)	3
US Billboard Hot 100	3
US Hot R&B/Hip-Hop Songs (Billboard)	3

=== Year-end charts ===
Year-end chart performance for "Lemon Pepper Freestyle"
Chart (2021)	Position
US Hot R&B/Hip-Hop Songs (Billboard)	84

== Certifications ==
Region	Certification	Certified units/sales
Australia (ARIA)	Gold	35,000^{‡}
New Zealand (RMNZ)	Gold	15,000^{‡}
United Kingdom (BPI)	Silver	200,000^{‡}
^{‡} Sales+streaming figures based on certification alone.
