= Too Fast =

2024 single by Future

Single by Future

from the album Mixtape Pluto
- Released: September 20, 2024
- Length: 3:25
- Label: Wilburn Holding; Epic
- Songwriters: Nayvadius Wilburn; Taurus Currie Jr.; Ivison Smith; Hampton Sallee; Evan McCoy; Cecilie Karshøj; Silas Moldenhawer
- Producers: Taurus; Ike Beatz; DJ Champ; McCoy

Future singles chronology
"Flex FM (Freddit)" (2024)	"Too Fast" (2024)	"Allure" (2024)

Music video
- "Too Fast" on YouTube

"Too Fast" is a song by American rapper Future and the lead single from his seventeenth mixtape, Mixtape Pluto (2024). Produced by Taurus, Ike Beatz, DJ Champ and Evan McCoy, it samples "1000 Times" by Coco O.

== Content ==
Lyrically, the song finds Future expressing regret on spending money extravagantly on luxury items for women whose relationships with him are short-lived and/or unsuccessful. He mentions numerous brands — including Patek Philippe, Richard Mille, Hermés, Bvlgari and Pucci — as well as taking his lover to Rodeo Drive and the Design District of West Hollywood, California.

== Critical reception ==
Reviewing Mixtape Pluto for Uproxx, Aaron Williams deemed the song one of the "standouts" for "fans who love wounded Future". Christopher R. Weingarten called it "a classic hip-hop tale of succumbing to temptations of success, but is told in that indelible Future way." Gary Suarez of Vulture criticized the song for its "branded brags", which he cited as a moment from the mixtape in which "familiarity casts a purple pallor over the proceedings." In regard to consistency in the mixtape's sequencing, Gabriel Bras Nevares of HotNewHipHop commented "It's not until "TOO FAST" and its admittedly basic presentation that we get a change."

== Charts ==
=== Weekly charts ===
Weekly chart performance for "Too Fast"
Chart (2024)	Peak position
Canada Hot 100 (Billboard)	62
New Zealand Hot Singles (RMNZ)	8
Global 200 (Billboard)	54
UK Singles (OCC)	77
US Billboard Hot 100	23
US Hot R&B/Hip-Hop Songs (Billboard)	4
US Rhythmic Airplay (Billboard)	1

=== Year-end charts ===
Year-end chart performance for "Too Fast"
Chart (2025)	Position
US Hot R&B/Hip-Hop Songs (Billboard)	80
US R&B/Hip-Hop Airplay (Billboard)	15
US Rhythmic Airplay (Billboard)	22
