= Pink Youth =

Single by Yuna and Little Simz

from the album Rouge
- Released: 30 June 2019
- Genre: Pop
- Length: 4:00
- Label: Verve Forecast, UMG Recordings
- Songwriters: Yunalis Zara'ai; Chloe Angelides; Robin Hannibal; Joel van Djik; Jason Pounds; Simbiatu Ajikawo
- Producer: Robin Hannibal

Yuna singles chronology
"Blank Marquee" (2019)	"Pink Youth" (2019)	"(Not) The Love of My Life" (2019)

Little Simz singles chronology
"Favourites" (2019)	"Pink Youth" (2019)	"Flowers (Live at Metropolis Studios, London, 2019)" (2019)

Music video
- "Pink Youth" on YouTube

"Pink Youth" is a song by Malaysian singer Yuna featuring English rapper, Little Simz, released as a third single for her fourth international studio album (her seventh overall), Rouge. It is co-written by Yuna, Chloe Angelides, Robin Hannibal, Joel van Djik, Jason Pounds and Little Simz and released on 30 June 2019 by Verve Forecast Records.

== Background and release ==
Yuna announced the release of her new album and the third single which highlighting the female empowerment. She got an inspiration to wrote "Pink Youth" based on her past experience on gender discrimination. Yuna said:

“When I was writing "Pink Youth", I wanted to celebrated being a girl. When I was younger, I remember a lot of people didn't believe in me just because I was a girl trying to do something amazing. This song is for all the girls out there who never got the encouragement and support they deserve,"

In an interview with The Star, Yuna reveals that the song was inspired by No Doubt's 1995 song "Just a Girl".

== Music video ==
The official video for "Pink Youth" was premiered on Yuna's official YouTube and Vevo account on 30 June 2019. It features futuristic anime theme with story and concept by Yuna and her husband, Adam Sinclair. The video features the animated visuals of Yuna and Little Simz saving the world from forces trying to capture all colour and hope from the world. It was directed by Esteban Valdez who also wrote and edited the video.

== Critical reception ==
In a retrospective review of Rouge, Skylar de Paul from The Daily Californian described the song "a discernibly 80s-influenced dance beat drives the groove of the song, resembling a modern Madonna revival". Adriane Pontecorvo from PopMatters called the song a "nu-disco banger" and "an obvious highlight".

== Release history ==
Country	Date	Format	Label
United States	30 June 2019	Digital download; streaming	Verve Forecast Records; UMG Recordings
