= August Rosenbaum =

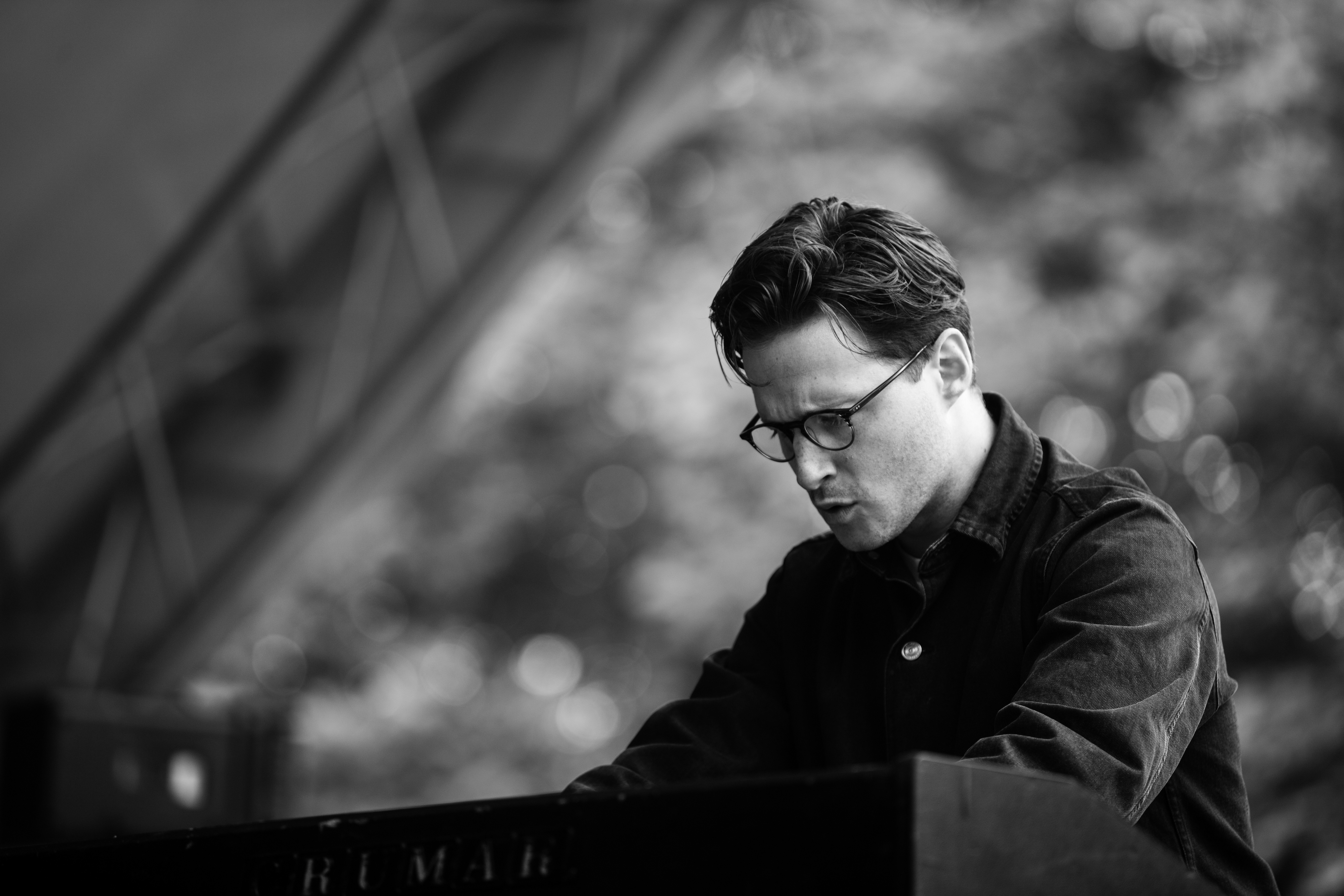

Background information
- Born: 30 April 1987 (age 38); Copenhagen
- Origin: Danish
- Occupations: Musician, composer, record producer
- Instrument: Piano
- Years active: 2005–present
- Labels: Escho Posh Isolation Tambourhinoceros

August Rosenbaum (born 1987) is a Danish composer, record producer and jazz pianist.

== Biography ==
Composer August Rosenbaum has won two Danish Music Awards, performed at the acclaimed Sónar Festival, and has been shortlisted for both the Nordic Music Prize and the National Danish Critics’ Award. His album Vista from 2017 and EP Rasa (2018) were produced by Grammy nominated producer Robin Hannibal and won the award for "Best Alternative Album" at the 2018 Danish Music Awards. In 2021 Rosenbaum exhibited the large scale installation Celeste at Copenhagen Contemporary together with artists Lea Guldditte Hestelund, Ea Verdoner and Cæcilie Trier. The score for the exhibition was released on the Copenhagen-based label Posh Isolation.

Rosenbaum is also known for collaborations with artists like Quadron, Rhye and MØ, Sonic Youth's Kim Gordon and visual artist Jesper Just. He has commissioned works for film, theatre and performances at a.o. Palais De Tokyo, The Metropolitan Museum of Art, Brooklyn Academy of Music and The Royal Danish Ballet.

== Discography ==
Artist	Track	Album	Record label	Credit	Year
Noah Carter	"Seu"	Noah's Ark	FORTYFIVE	Writer, Producer, Keyboards, Synthesizer, Recording	2024
Kindness	"Falasteen"	"Falasteen"	Kindness	Piano	2024
KIDD	"Tanker fra Sandvig"	OG SÅ VIDERE	Universal	Writer, Producer, Arranger, Keyboards, Organ, Synthesizer, Recording	2024
Coco O.	"Many Ways" "Someone Younger" "Choral" "To A Friend" "Fertile Feelings" "Sober Glow" "August" "Watching The News"	Sharing is Caring (EP)	Sony	Writer, Producer, Arranger, Keyboards, Organ, Synthesizer, Recording	2023
August Rosenbaum	"5:00 am (light on building)" "8:00 am (in the shadow is the view of the crowd)" "9:00 pm (nox)" "2:00 am (dark green)" "3:30 am (time passes time)"	in the shadow is the view of the crowd	Escho	Writer, Producer, Arranger, Piano	2023
Courtesy ft. Erika De Casier & August Rosenbaum	"You're Not Alone"	fra eufori	Kulør	Producer, Piano	2023
August Rosenbaum	"Sorry" "Fiction (ft. Ian Isiah)" "No Label (ft. Emi Wes & Felukah)" "Selfish Kind of Love" "Empire (ft. Moses Boyd & Philip Owusu)" "Swim On" "East Side (ft. Lil Halima)" "Revolve" "Hypnotized (ft. Jada)" "Seconds (ft. Coco O.)" "Tidal Wave (ft. Hans Philip)" "Empire (solo piano)"	songs people together	Escho	Writer, Producer, Arranger, Keyboards, Organ, Synthesizer, Vocals, Recording	2023
Hans Philip	"Ciel" "Rubato" "Tal Til Mig" "LATE04" "OPT 31"	[α] & [β]	FORTYFIVE	Writer, Producer, Arranger, Piano, Organ, Synthesizer, Recording	2022
CTM + August Rosenbaum	"Cello Permutation" "Masi Stone Duet" "Sarabande" "Angel" "Spider Web" "Wasa Stone Trio" "Crumar (Runway)" "Celeste Song" "Accordeon Permutation" "Sedative" "Even If" "Piano Permutation"	Celeste	Posh Isolation	Writer, Producer, Arranger, Piano, Synthesizer, Recorded by	2021
Coco O.	"Love Won't Win" "Arms" "Worry" "Sorry" "Cruelty"	It's A Process	Sony	Writer, Producer, Arranger, Piano, Bass, Synthesizer	2021
Niia	"Not Up For Discussion" (feat. Laura Lee) "If I Should Die" (feat. Girl Ultra) "Oh Girl" Macaroni Salad"	If I Should Die	NIIAROCCO	Writer, Piano, Organ, Keyboards	2021
August Rosenbaum	"Selfish" (Selma harp)	Escho 15 år (compilation)	Escho	Writer, Producer, Piano	2020
August Rosenbaum Loke Rahbek Frederik Valentin	"Solina" (August Rosenbaum rework)	Elephant Reworks	Posh Isolation	Piano, Arranger	2020
Emi Wes	"Issues"	Departure	Universal	Piano, Arranger	2020
Niia	"Whatever You Got" "Obsession" "Sad Boys" "La Bella Vita" "Positano" "If You Won't Marry Me Right Now"	II	NIIAROCCO	Writer, Co-prod., Piano, Keyboards,	2020
Kindness	"Dreams Fall" "Call It Down" (Bonus track)	Something Like A War	Female Energy	Piano, Arranger	2019
Yuna	“Tiada Akhir”	ROUGE	Verve Pop	Writer, Piano	2019
Yuna	“Castaway” (ft. Tyler The Creator) “Blank Marquee” (ft. G-Eazy) “(Not) The Love Of My Life” “Forget About You”	ROUGE	Verve Pop	Piano, Rhodes, Arranger	2019
Niia	"If I Cared"	If I Cared (single)	Niia	Keyboards, Synthesizer	2019
Goss	"Don't Fade Away"	Homeland Security	AWAL	Arranger, Synthesizer	2018
Yore	“Angel Eyes”	Angel Eyes (single)	independently popular.	Arranger, Piano	2018
Coco O.	"1000 Times"	1000 Times (single)	Coco O.	Arranger, Synthesizer	2018
August Rosenbaum	"Angelo (Solo Piano)" "Belmondo (Solo Piano)" "Nomad (Solo Piano)" "Calling Out (Solo Piano)" "Skin (Solo Piano)" "Milo (Solo Piano)"	Rasa (EP)	Tambourhinoceros	Writer, Arranger, Solo Artist	2018
August Rosenbaum	"Nomad" (Solo Piano)	Nomad - Solo Piano (single)	Tambourhinoceros	Writer, Arranger, Solo Artist	2018
August Rosenbaum	"Credo Pt II" (ft. Coco O) "Credo Pt II - live" (ft. Coco O)	Credo Pt. II (single)	Tambourhinoceros	Writer, Arranger, Solo Artist	2017
August Rosenbaum	"Angelo" "Belmondo" "Nomad" "Nebula" "Killer" "Calling Out" (feat. Philip Owusu) "Skin" "Tristana" "Emo" "Credo" "Melville" "Victim"	Vista	Tambourhinoceros	Writer, Arranger, Solo Artist	2017
Niia	"Last Night In Los Feliz" "All I Need" "Mulholland"	I	Atlantic Records	Writer, Arranger, Piano, Synthesizer	2017
Jameszoo	"Meat"	Fool	Brainfeeder	Writer, Organ	2016
August Rosenbaum	"Celeste" "Rhizome" "Weave"	Rhizome	Hiatus	Writer, Producer, Arranger, Solo Artist, Celeste, Piano	2016
Quadron	"Befriend" "Sea Salt" "It's Gonna Get You"	Avalanche	Vested In Culture / Epic	Writer, Arranger, Piano, Synthesizer, Organ	2013
Rhye	"The Fall" "Verse" "Shed Some Blood" "Major Minor Love"	Woman	Polydor / Universal Republic	Piano	2013
August Rosenbaum	"Bloomer" "Sea Urchin" "Heights" "Calm" "Kimono" "Fluid"	Heights	Hiatus	Writer, Producer, Arranger, Solo Artist, Piano, Cembalo	2013
Jameszoo, August Rosenbaum & Stephen Bruner	"Fusion" "Jordi"	Various Assets	Red Bull Music Academy	Writer, Rhodes, Organ, Synthesizer	2013
Sven-Åke Johansson, Lars Greve & August Rosenbaum	"1" "2" "3" "4" "5" "6" "7"	All Romantic	Hiatus	Writer, Producer, Piano	2013
Quadron	"Baby Be Mine"	Think Like A Man OST	Epic	Synthesizer	2012
August Rosenbaum Trio	"Delicate Matter" "Pannon" "Let Me Leave With You" "Shoyn Fargessen" "Be On The Lookout" "Her Har Vi Balladen" "D'accord" "Heinseit"	Live LP	Self released	Writer, Producer, Arranger, Piano	2011
August Rosenbaum	"Beholder" "Absentia" "Way Out" "Still It Moves" "Romantics" "Heinseit" "Delicate Matter" "Shoyn Fargessen"	Beholder	Hiatus	Writer, Producer, Arranger, Solo Artist, Piano	2010
Bobby	"Move"	Bobby EP	Plug Research	Piano	2010
Quadron	"Pressure"	Quadron	Plug Research	Piano, Organ	2009

== Soundtrack ==
=== Music for film, performance, exhibitions ===
- Piano Works by August Rosenbaum, 2024, DR Koncerthuset
- Vores Fars Sol by Jasper Spanning, 2024
- Interfears by Jesper Just, 2024, Galerie Perrotin Los Angeles / Nicolai Wallner Copenhagen
- All Kinds of Love by Casper Sejersen, Tilda Swinton, 2024
- Celeste by August Rosenbaum, Lea Guldditte Hestelund, Ea Verdoner, Cæcilie Trier, 2021, Copenhagen Contemporary.
- Seminarium by Jesper Just, 2021, Gl. Holtegaard / Galerie Perrotin Tokyo
- The City Cecilie Bahnsen campaign film (2021, Paris Fashion Week)
- The Summit Cecilie Bahnsen campaign film (2020, Paris Fashion Week)
- En Helt Almindelig Familie feature film by Malou Reymann (2020, Nordisk Film)
- Corporealities by Jesper Just, 2020, Galerie Perrotin, New York.
- Servitudes by Jesper Just, 2019, Palais de Tokyo, Paris. Metropolitan Museum of Art, New York. Maat, Lisbon. Charlottenborg Kunsthal, Copenhagen
- Nomad (video) by Jasper Spanning (2018, Prxjects, New Land)
- Circuits by Jesper Just (2018, Galleri Nicolai Wallner, Copenhagen. 2020, SMK - the Danish National Gallery, Copenhagen)
- Interpassitivities by Jesper Just (2018, BAM, New York, The Royal Danish Ballet)
- Credo Part II ft. Coco O (video) by Jasper Spanning (2017, Prxjects, New Land)
- Nebula (video) by Andreas Emenius (2017, Prxjects, SPRING Nordisk Film)
- Simon - a portrait of Simon Rosenbaum by Bente Milton (2017, DR)
- King Lear by Peter Langdal (2016, The Royal Danish Theatre)
- In Your Arms feature film by Samanou A. Sahlstrøm (2015, Meta Film)
- Interruption by Malou Reymann (2015, Nordisk Film)
- Eliten by Thomas Daneskov (2015, Nordisk Film)
- Black Rider by Robert Wilson, dir. Katrine Wiedemann (2015, Betty Nansen)
- Laughter in The Dark by Kirsten Delholm (2015, Hotel Pro Forma)
- What Difference Does It Make by Ralf Schmerberg (2014, Red Bull Music Academy)
- Katalog 1 by Jasper Spanning (2014, JS)
- 16.5 Time by Malou Reymann (2013, Danish Film Institute)
- Talk Before It's Too Late by Daniel Kragh Jakobsen (2012, Bubbles)
- Dem Man Elsker by Malou Reymann (2012, Danish Film Institute)
- Les Amours Perdues by Samanou A. Sahlstrøm (2011, Den Danske Filmskole)
- Backwater by Thomas Daneskov (2011, Killit Film)
- Sirens of Chrome by Jesper Just (2010, Jesper Just)

== Awards and nominations ==
Danish Music Awards

- 2018 - Alternative album of the year (Jazz, Alternative) - Vista (Won)

Danish Theatre Critics Award

- 2017 - Best Performance (Nominated for Interpassivities)

Göteborg Film Festival - Dragon Award

- 2015 - Best Nordic Film (Winner - In Your Arms)

Danish Music Awards

- 2014 - Best Jazz Composer (Nominated)
- 2010 - Best New Jazz Artist (Won)

Danish Critics Choice Award

- 2014 - Musician of the year (Nominated)

Nordic Music Prize

- 2014 - Best Album (Shortlisted)
- 2010 - Best Album (Shortlisted)

Danish Publishers Award

- 2014 - Best Jazz Composer (Nominated)

Danish Arts Council

- 2011-2013 - Den Unge Elite (Won)

Léonie Sonning Music Prize

- 2011 - Young Talent Award (Won)
