= Blank Marquee =

Single by Yuna and G-Eazy

from the album Rouge
- Released: 16 May 2019
- Genre: Pop
- Length: 3:40
- Label: Verve Forecast, UMG Recordings
- Songwriters: Yunalis Zara'ai; Chloe Angelides; Robin Hannibal; Gerald Gillum
- Producer: Robin Hannibal

Yuna singles chronology
| "Forevermore" (2019) | "Blank Marquee" (2019) | "Pink Youth" (2019) |

G-Eazy singles chronology
| "Wobble Up" (2019) | "Blank Marquee" (2019) | "Throw Fits" (2019) |

Music video
- "Blank Marquee" on YouTube

"Blank Marquee" is a song by Malaysian singer Yuna featuring American rapper G-Eazy, released as a second single for her fourth international studio album (her seventh overall), Rouge. It is co-written by Yuna, Chloe Angelides, Robin Hannibal and G-Eazy, with Hannibal serves as the producer. The song was released on 16 May 2019 by Verve Music Group.

== Music video ==
The music video for "Blank Marquee" was directed by Yuna's husband, Adam Sinclair and features award-winning actor Amerul Affendi and US-based Malaysian supermodel Atikah Karim. The video was filmed in some locations in Kuala Lumpur including Bukit Bintang and Kuala Lumpur Convention Centre (KLCC). Some scenes in the video also filmed at The Kuala Lumpur Journal hotel.

The music video was released on Yuna's official YouTube and Vevo account at the official launch date.

== Critical reception ==
Rania Aniftos from Billboard wrote that the song follows "a suspicious deal that transpires in Malaysia's capital of Kuala Lumpur". Nada Mesh from HotNewHipHop deemed it as "a beat reminiscent of a Pharell and Daft Punk type song". Skylar de Paul from The Daily Californian said that the song was "an empowering lo-fi funk" and felt that the track is "a melodic argument between both sides of the disagreement, and boy is it entertaining". Adriane Pontecorvo from PopMatters described that Yuna's refrain of the song "that sells this as a song to belt out even as the singer keeps things subtle".

== Personnel ==
Song

- Yuna – vocal, composition
- Chloe Angelides, Robin Hannibal and Gerald Gillum – composition

Music video

- Amerul Affendi – The Villain
- Atikah Karim – The Driver
- Noorul-Hudaa – extras
- Elena Laurel Moujing – extras
- Tess Pang – extras
- Anessa Alsagoff – extras
- Adam Sinclair – director
- Kroll Azry, Jorene Chew – producer
- Eric Hu – executive producer
- Aidil Razali – director of photography
- Rabbani Sujak – art director
- Yeoh Po Li – make-up artist
- Ajay Kumar – editor
- Pitt Haniff – assistant producer
- Haida Yusof-Yeomans, Zulvanny Andiny – stylist

== Charts ==
| Chart (2019) | Peak position |
|---|---|
| Malaysia (RIM) | 12 |
| US Adult R&B Songs (Billboard) | 17 |

== Release history ==
| Country | Date | Format | Label |
|---|---|---|---|
| Malaysia | 16 May 2019 | Digital download, streaming | Verve Music Group |
