= Hey Love (Quadron song) =

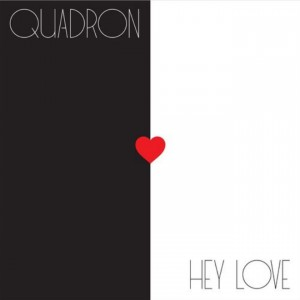

Single by Quadron

from the album Avalanche
- Released: 14 February 2013
- Recorded: Westlake Recording Studios (Los Angeles, California)
- Genre: Alternative
- Length: 3:22
- Label: Vested in Culture
- Songwriters: Ali Tamposi, Fraser T. Smith, Quadron
- Producers: Fraser T. Smith, Robin Hannibal

Quadron singles chronology
| "Buster Keaton" (2010) | "Hey Love" (2013) | "Favorite Star" (2013) |

Music video
- "Hey Love" on YouTube

"Hey Love" is a song written, produced and performed by Danish duo Quadron. It was issued as the lead single off their album Avalanche. It peaked number eight on the Danish Singles Chart, and was also certified gold in Denmark. The song also did well critically. The music video premiered in April 2013.

== Production and composition ==
"Hey Love" was written by Ali Tamposi, Fraser T. Smith and Quadron, and produced by Smith and duo member Robin Hannibal. It is the only track on Quadron that was made with an outside producer, who was Smith, because the group wanted to create a different-sounding song from the other tracks on the album. According to Coco, "Hey Love" was inspired by Nina Simone's “See Line Woman”. The track was recorded at Westlake Recording Studios in Los Angeles. Smith performed the piano, additional drums and percussion, while Hannibal played all the other instruments. It was engineered by Andrew Schwartz, Chris "Tek" O'Ryan, Kuk Harrell, Marcos Tovar and Steven Valenzuela, with Harrell handling production of Coco O's vocals. Manny Marroquin mixed the track with assistance from Chris Galland, Delbert Bowers and Robin Hannibal, and, finally, Manny Marroquin mastered it.

== Release and reception ==
"Hey Love" was first released for online streaming on 14 February 2013. It was later released to digital music retailers in Europe, Latin America, Mexico and Singapore on 1 March. It was issued as the lead single off Quadron's second album Quadron, where it was listed as the third track. A remix EP featuring remixes of the song by Classixx, Ryan Hemsworth, Sinden (DJ), Branko and Balistiq, was issued on 1 November. The single debuted at number 40 on the Danish Singles Chart, reaching the number eight spot and lasting on the chart for 26 weeks, and was certified gold by IFPI Denmark. It was the 32nd best-selling song of 2013 in Denmark.

Critics were favorable towards "Hey Love". Pitchfork Media writer Jamieson Cox said the song was "a display of both vocal power and chemistry, the perfect timing appropriate for a pair with years of experience together." Will Hermes of Rolling Stone said it "splits the difference between Adele and Amy Winehouse", and proved "Coco is far more than a hook queen."

== Music videos ==
"Hey Love"'s music video was filmed in Lakewood, Los Angeles. It premiered on 8 April 2013.

== Live performances ==
Quadron performed an acoustic version of "Hey Love" for the magazine Elle in May 2013. On 4 June, when Avalanche was released, the group were interviewed about the album at Billboard Studios, and performed "Hey Love" along with another song from the album, "Favorite Star".

== In other media ==
"Hey Love" was played in a season finale of the TV series Mob Wives. Anthony Jasmin performed "Hey Love" as their second song during the semi-final of the seventh season of the Danish version of X FactorHey Love also features in "Greys Anatomy" - season 9, episode 18.

== Track listing ==
Digital download

1. "Hey Love" – 3:22

Remix EP

1. "Hey Love (Classixx Remix)" – 4:26
2. "Hey Love (Ryan Hemsworth Remix)" – 3:31
3. "Hey Love (Sinden Remix)" – 6:22
4. "Hey Love (Branko Remix)" – 4:22
5. "Hey Love (Balistiq Remix)" – 5:15

== Chart positions ==
=== Weekly ===
| Chart (2013–2014) | Peak position |
|---|---|
| Denmark (Tracklisten) | 8 |

=== Year-end ===
| Chart (2013) | Position |
|---|---|
| Denmark (Tracklisten) | 32 |

== Certifications ==
| Region | Certification | Certified units/sales |
|---|---|---|
| Denmark (IFPI Danmark) | Gold | 15,000^{^} |
Streaming
| Denmark (IFPI Danmark) | Platinum | 1,800,000^{†} |
^{^} Shipments figures based on certification alone.^{†} Streaming-only figures based on certification alone.

== Release history ==
| Region | Date | Format | Label |
|---|---|---|---|
| Worldwide | 14 February 2013 | Streaming | Vested in Culture |
| Europe | 1 March 2013 | Digital download | Vested in Culture |
| Latin America | 1 March 2013 | Digital download | Vested in Culture |
| Mexico | 1 March 2013 | Digital download | Vested in Culture |
| Singapore | 1 March 2013 | Digital download | Vested in Culture |
| Worldwide | 1 November 2013 | Digital download – remixes | Vested in Culture |
