= Mixtape Pluto =

- The Dungeon Family house with magenta lights shining outside during the midnight.

Mixtape by Future
- Released: September 20, 2024
- Recorded: 2024
- Length: 44:52
- Label: Freebandz; Epic
- Producer: 2forWoyne; 808 Jayy; ATL Jacob; AyoPeeb; BeatzByRRose; Car!ton; Che' Fuego 3000; Desro; DJ Champ; DY Krazy; FBG Goat; FnZ; Gedo; Honorable C.N.O.T.E.; Ike Beatz; Jack Uriah; Juke Wong; Koncept P; London on da Track; McCoy; MoXart Beatz; Neenyo; NothingtoSay; Rocaine; Romil Hemnani; Sean Momberger; Smatt Sertified; Southside; Taurus; Topp; Wheezy; Bryan Yepes

Future chronology
We Still Don't Trust You (2024)	Mixtape Pluto (2024)	The Real Me (2026)

Singles from Mixtape Pluto
- 1. "Too Fast" Released: September 20, 2024; 2. "South of France" Released: November 1, 2024

Alternative cover
- Alternate album cover found in an X post by Genius, where the post announces the release date.

Mixtape Pluto is the debut solo commercial mixtape (Note: Publications currently differ in labeling Mixtape Pluto as a mixtape or studio album. Sources that label it as a mixtape include: Sources that label it as an album include:) (seventeenth overall) by the American rapper Future. It was released through Freebandz and Epic Records on September 20, 2024. Production on the mixtape was primarily handled by Southside and Wheezy, with help from ATL Jacob, FnZ, Honorable C.N.O.T.E., London on da Track, and Neenyo, among others. It serves as his third and final release of 2024, following his two collaborative albums with Metro Boomin, We Don't Trust You and We Still Don't Trust You. The project also marks Future’s first solo full-length release since I Never Liked You (2022) and his first solo mixtape in eight years, following the release of Purple Reign (2016).

The mixtape was supported by two singles, "Too Fast" and "South of France", the latter of which received a remix in collaboration with fellow American rapper and singer Travis Scott and was added to a reissued version.

== Background ==
On May 8, 2024, Future seemingly hinted towards the release of a mixtape to be released on May 10, which would actually turn out to be the release date from his then-upcoming feature on fellow American rapper Tee Grizzley's single, "Swear to God". from his upcoming album Post Traumatic However, it would eventually turn out to be postponed. In July 2024, producer Southside revealed that he was working on the project and described the work as a "new sound, like a whole new vibe". On September 2, four months after the project was first promised to be released, Future announced in a social media post that the mixtape was about to be released with a snippet of the song "Lil Demon" playing as he is seen in a recording studio. The mixtape would also see preorders become available, along with the confirmation of its status as an album. To promote the release, a 30-second video trailer was shared the following week with another song playing in the background. On September 6, fellow American rapper and singer Travis Scott teased the song "South of France", even though he was not featured on it. Future shared the artwork and release date alongside a snippet of a track titled "Too Fast" on September 11. The track listing was revealed on September 17.

== Critical reception ==
Professional ratings
Aggregate scores
Source	Rating
Metacritic	73/100
Review scores
Source	Rating
Clash	8/10
laut.de	3/5 stars
Pitchfork	7.9/10
Rolling Stone	3.5/5 stars

According to the review aggregator Metacritic, Mixtape Pluto currently has a score of 73 out of 100 based on four critic reviews, indicating "generally favorable" reception. Robin Murray for Clash wrote that the mixtape is "beset with jewels", referring to "Surfing a Tsunami" and "Oath". However, he also stated that "it’s not perfect" and that there are "some moments that don’t hit as hard as others", highlighting "Plutoski" and "MJ". Murray concluded his review by writing that, "Mixtape Pluto offers ample evidence to [Future's] continuing singular form of genius". HotNewHipHop's Elias Andrews wrote in a positive review, "Mixtape Pluto is the comeback that mid-2010s fans have been waiting for. The song titles are concise and hard-hitting, as the beats and lyrics." Stereogum's Tom Breihan wrote in a positive review, "On first listen, none of Future's lyrics will fuel the gossip cycle. But this is a great example of Future sounding focused, even when he also sounds like he's high out of his mind".

== Commercial performance ==
In the United States, Mixtape Pluto debuted at number one on the Billboard 200 with 129,000 album-equivalent units, which included 156.62 million on-demand streams and 10,000 pure album sales. It marked Future's eleventh number-one album in the country and his third in the last six months. The mixtape is also the second project with no features to debut atop the Billboard 200 in the 2020s decade, following YoungBoy Never Broke Again's Sincerely, Kentrell (2021). It also marks Future's third No. 1 entry in 2024, making him the first and only rap artist to have three projects to debut atop of the Billboard 200 in the same year.

== Track listing ==
Mixtape Pluto – standard edition track listing
No.	Title	Writer(s)	Producer(s)	Length
1.	"Teflon Don"	Nayvadius Wilburn; Nicolas Berlinger; Joshua Luellen; London Holmes; Mateen Niknam; DeAvonte Kimble; Giovanni Rinaldi; Martell Smith-Williams	Southside; London on da Track; AyoPeeb; Topp; FBG Goat; Desro; MoXart Beatz	2:39
2.	"Lil Demon"	Wilburn; Luellen; Matthew-Kyle Brown	Southside; Smatt Sertified	2:19
3.	"Ski"	Wilburn; Luellen; Brown; Lychkin Vladimirovich; David McAllister	Southside; Smatt Sertified; Gedo	2:27
4.	"Ready to Cook Up"	Wilburn; Wesley Glass; Lucas DePante	Wheezy; Juke Wong	2:47
5.	"Plutoski"	Wilburn; Glass; Luellen; DePante; James Brown; Jonathan Smith; Gerald McCrary; Paul Lewis; Wendell Neal; Sammie Norris	Wheezy; Southside; Juke Wong	2:59
6.	"Too Fast"	Wilburn; Taurus Currie Jr.; Isaac Allwine; Hampton Sallee; Evan McCoy; Cecilie Karshøj; Silas Moldenhawer	Taurus; Ike Made; DJ Champ; McCoy	3:25
7.	"Ocean"	Wilburn; Glass; Carlton Mays Jr.; Dylan Cleary-Krell; Abraham Herrera; Ciaran Mullan	Wheezy; Honorable C.N.O.T.E.; Dez Wright; Jack Uriah; Mu Lean	3:23
8.	"Press the Button"	Wilburn; Luellen; Kimble; Martell Smith; Berlinger; Jason Rosenberg	Southside; Topp; FBG Goat; BeatzByRRose; MoXart Beatz	2:50
9.	"MJ"	Wilburn; Glass; Romil Hemnani; Dawoyne Lawson; Bryan Yepes	Wheezy; Hemnani; 2forWoyne; Yepes	1:54
10.	"Brazzier"	Wilburn; Luellen; Dwan Avery	Southside; DY Krazy	3:08
11.	"South of France"	Wilburn; Glass; Luellen; Carlton McDowell, Jr.	Wheezy; Southside; Car!ton	1:48

Digital track listing
No.	Title	Writer(s)	Producer(s)	Length
12.	"Surfing a Tsunami"	Wilburn; Glass; Che Pope	Wheezy; Che' Fuego 3000	3:33
13.	"Made My Hoe Faint"	Wilburn; Glass; Luellen; Sean Momberger; Dark Sanctuary	Wheezy; Southside; Momberger	1:55
14.	"Told My"	Wilburn; Avery; DePante; Nicholas Santos; Andrea Saporito; Paul Beauregard; Robert Cooper Philips	DY Krazy; Juke Wong; Slowburnz; NothingtoSay; Wheezy	1:41
15.	"Oath"	Wilburn; Currie; Ozro Graham Jr.; Paul Penso; James Sampson	Taurus; Rocaine; Koncept P; 808 Jayy	1:34
16.	"Lost My Dog"	Wilburn; Jacob Canady; Michael Mulé; Isaac De Boni; Jaime Woods	ATL Jacob; FnZ	2:53
17.	"Aye Say Gang"	Wilburn; Glass; DePante; Sean Seaton; Pope	Wheezy; Juke Wong; Neenyo; Che' Fuego 3000	3:28
Total length:				44:52

Reissue bonus track
No.	Title	Writer(s)	Producer(s)	Length
18.	"South of France" (remix; with Travis Scott)	Wilburn; Jacques Bermon Webster II; Glass; Luellen; McDowell	Wheezy; Southside; Carlton	3:04

=== Notes ===
- "MJ" is short for "monkey juice".
- "Teflon Don" contains a sample of "Love Theme from The Godfather", composed by Nino Rota.
- "Ski" contains an uncredited sample of "Shadow Man", composed by David McAllister.
- "Plutoski" contains a sample of "I Got You (I Feel Good)", written and performed by James Brown.
- "Too Fast" contains a sample of "1000 Times", written by Cecilie Karshøj and Silas Moldenhawer, and performed by Coco O.
- "Surfing a Tsunami" contains elements of "Patek", composed by Jimmy Ledrac.
- "Made My Hoe Faint" contains an uncredited sample of "The Hills", written by Abel Tesfaye, Ahmad Balshe, Emmanuel Nickerson and Carlo Montagnese, and performed by the Weeknd.
- "Told My" contains a sample of "Let Em Know" and "Whatcha Gonna Do", both written by Robert Cooper Phillips and Paul Beauregard, and performed by Koopsta Knicca.
- "Lost My Dog" contains a sample of "How Love's Made", written and performed by Jaime Woods.
- "Aye Say Gang" contains an uncredited sample of "Nobody / A Place to Vent", written and performed by Jay Cooper.

== Charts ==
=== Weekly charts ===
Weekly chart performance for Mixtape Pluto
Chart (2024–2025)	Peak position
Australian Albums (ARIA)	12
Australian Hip Hop/R&B Albums (ARIA)	12
Austrian Albums (Ö3 Austria)	12
Belgian Albums (Ultratop Flanders)	12
Belgian Albums (Ultratop Wallonia)	26
Canadian Albums (Billboard)	4
Croatian International Albums (HDU)	28
Czech Albums (ČNS IFPI)	10
Danish Albums (Hitlisten)	14
Dutch Albums (Album Top 100)	8
Finnish Albums (Suomen virallinen lista)	27
French Albums (SNEP)	26
German Albums (Offizielle Top 100)	25
Greek Albums (IFPI)	33
Hungarian Albums (MAHASZ)	10
Icelandic Albums (Tónlistinn)	6
Irish Albums (Official Charts)	25
Italian Albums (FIMI)	24
Lithuanian Albums (AGATA)	8
New Zealand Albums (RMNZ)	8
Nigerian Albums (TurnTable)	34
Norwegian Albums (VG-lista)	6
Polish Albums (ZPAV)	23
Portuguese Albums (AFP)	11
Slovak Albums (ČNS IFPI)	4
Swedish Albums (Sverigetopplistan)	34
Swiss Albums (Schweizer Hitparade)	8
UK Albums (Official Charts)	11
UK R&B Albums (Official Charts)	40
US Billboard 200	1
US Top R&B/Hip-Hop Albums (Billboard)	1

=== Year-end charts ===
2024 year-end chart performance for Mixtape Pluto
Chart (2024)	Position
US Top R&B/Hip-Hop Albums (Billboard)	58

2025 year-end chart performance for Mixtape Pluto
Chart (2025)	Position
US Billboard 200	177
US Top R&B/Hip-Hop Albums (Billboard)	58
