= Hey Love =

"Hey Love" may refer to:

== Songs ==
- "Hey Love" (Stevie Wonder song), a 1966 soul song by Stevie Wonder
- "Hey Love", a song by The Delfonics from the 1972 album Tell Me This Is a Dream
- "Hey Love (Can I Have a Word)", a 1992 song by R. Kelly and Public Announcement featuring Mr. Lee
- "Hey Love" (Quadron song), a 2013 song by the Danish duo Quadron

== Albums ==
- Hey, Love, a 1971 album by New Rotary Connection
- Hey Love (album), a 2015 album by the Canadian singer-songwriter Hayden

== See also ==
- "Talkin' Bout Hey Love", a song by De La Soul from the 1991 album De La Soul Is Dead
