= Forevermore (Yuna song) =

Single by Yuna

from the album Rouge
- Released: 5 April 2019
- Genre: Pop
- Length: 3:53
- Label: Verve Forecast Records, UMG Recordings
- Songwriters: Yunalis Zarai, Alexandra Govere, Robin Hannibal
- Producer: Robin Hannibal

Yuna singles chronology
| "Crush" (2016) | "Forevermore" (2019) | "Blank Marquee" (2019) |

Music video
- "Forevermore" on YouTube

"Forevermore" is a song by Malaysian singer-songwriter Yuna, released as the first single from her fourth international studio album (her seventh overall), Rouge. The song, which tells about Yuna's life experience grew up in Malaysia, it was co-written by Yuna, Alexandra Govere and Robin Hannibal and released on 5 April 2019 by Verve Music Group.

== Commercial performance ==
"Forevermore" debuted at number-one on Malaysia's RIM Domestic Chart on 11 April 2019, her first number-one since the reintroduction of the official chart in 2017.

== Music video ==
The music video for "Forevermore" was produced by 33.3 Creative and filmed in 11 locations in Malaysia including Kuala Lumpur and Perlis, it was directed by Yuna's husband, Adam Sinclair. According to her, the song is about growing up in a small town and coming from a small country and how that "environment made me strive to be the best that I can be". The official music video was released on the same day.

Since its release, the video has garnered more than 3 million views.

== Format and track listing ==
- Digital download
1. "Forevermore" – 3:53

== Personnel ==
Song

- Yunalis Zarai – vocal
- Yunalis Zarai, Robin Hannibal – composition

Music video

- Adam Sinclair – director
- Edwin Raj & Ian Kirk – producer
- Samuel Lam – director of photography
- Rabbani Sujak – art director
- Karma Raines – choreographer
- Kroll Azry – assistant director
- Haida Yusof-Yeomans – stylist

== Charts ==
| Chart (2019) | Peak position |
|---|---|
| Malaysia (RIM) | 1 |

== Release history ==
| Country | Date | Format | Label |
|---|---|---|---|
| Malaysia | 5 April 2019 | Digital download, streaming | Verve Music Group |
