= Rouge (Yuna album) =

2019 album by Malaysian singer Yuna

Studio album by Yuna
- Released: July 12, 2019
- Recorded: 2017–2019
- Studio: Chalice Studios; Red Bull Studios; 10603 Studios; Arketek Studios; Sonic Element Studios
- Genre: Pop; R&B
- Length: 41:30
- Label: Verve Forecast; UMG
- Producer: Benjamin Willis (exec.); Cardiak; Fisticuffs; J. LBS; Robin Hannibal

Yuna chronology
Chapters (2016)	Rouge (2019)	Y1 (2022)

Singles from Rouge
- 1. "Forevermore" Released: April 5, 2019; 2. "Blank Marquee" Released: May 16, 2019; 3. "Pink Youth" Released: June 30, 2019; 4. "(Not) The Love of My Life" Released: August 22, 2019; 5. "Castaway" Released: October 16, 2019; 6. "Teenage Heartbreak" Released: November 22, 2019

Rouge is the fourth international studio album by Malaysian singer-songwriter Yuna. The album, which saw her collaborate with many international acts, was released on July 12, 2019, by labels Verve Forecast Records and Universal Music Group. Five songs in the album were released as singles. Rouge, Yuna's seventh album overall, was recorded between 2017 and 2019.

== Background ==
The album took two years to complete. According to Yuna in an exclusive interview with the Malaysian tabloid newspaper, Kosmo!: "It took me two years to produce this album. That's true, it took a while to produce a studio album. But that is because I work with different producers".

On May 17, 2019, Yuna announced the official release of Rouge on her personal Instagram account, the album cover depicts Yuna in a red dress and a bunny cross on her head. In an interview, she disclosed that the album title was French for "red" which signifies love, spirit and strength. Yuna choose the title to reflect the bolder she is. In an interview with Billboard, she said: "I’ve always felt like red is such a bold colour and I felt like, ‘Oh, maybe it’s not for me.’ Even the colour, the lipstick colour is maybe not for me. That's always been the person that I am". The cover photography was captured by Steven Taylor.

== Tour ==
To promote Rouge, Yuna embark her US tour, which took place in Chicago on 14 July followed by Washington, New York City, Boston dan Los Angeles and the last stop in Oakland on 2 August.

== Singles ==
The first single to be released in the album is "Forevermore" on April 5, 2019. Its music video, directed by Yuna's husband, Adam Sinclair, in which revolves around her ode to Malaysia, where she was born and raised as well as showcasing the beauty of Malaysia. On May 16, the second single "Blank Marquee", featuring G-Eazy was released, with music video filmed in Kuala Lumpur, featuring actor Amerul Affendi and US-based Malaysian supermodel, Atikah Karim. The video, also directed by Sinclair. The third single, "Pink Youth" features English rapper Little Simz was released on June 30, with futuristic-themed music video directed by Esteban Valdez (who also wrote and edited the video), while its story and concept by Yuna and Sinclair. "(Not) The Love of My Life", the fourth single from the album, was released on August 22, with Bollywood-themed music video was directed by Yuna herself. The fifth and last single from the album, "Castaway", featuring Tyler, the Creator was released on October 16.

== Critical reception ==
Rouge received generally positive reviews from critics. Chris Malone Méndez from Forbes wrote that "Rouge serves as Yuna's most dynamic record to date, and should excite fans both new and old about what to expect from her next" and felt that most of the album tracklist is "filled with after-hours R&B that Yuna has become known for on her previous projects". Adriane Pontecorvo from PopMatters said, “Rouge is, in some ways, a redefinition of what it means to be a worldwide star. The same factors that make it unique, also make it the epitome of successful pop music; it's easy to listen to and deliberately engaging of audiences everywhere." Kayleigh O'Malley from Eleven PDX called the album as "a summer album for the brokenhearted". Skylar de Paul from The Daily Californian described the album as "full of energy, war, strength, determination, passion, and basically every other characteristic tied to the connotations”. Symphreona Clark from YR noted that the album "combines pop with a modern-day take on disco, creating a luminescent piece that is both coherent and fun". Rouge got a 6.8 from Pitchfork review.

== Track listing ==
No.	Title	Writer(s)	Length
1.	"Castaway" (featuring Tyler, the Creator)	Yunalis Zara'ai; Chloe Angelides; Robin Hannibal; Tyler Okonma	4:29
2.	"Blank Marquee" (featuring G-Eazy)	Yuna; Angelides; Hannibal; Gerald Gillum	3:40
3.	"(Not) The Love of My Life"	Yuna; Alexandra Govere; Hannibal	3:37
4.	"Teenage Heartbreak" (with Miyavi)	Yuna; Jason Pounds; Takamasa Ishihara	4:16
5.	"Pink Youth" (with Little Simz)	Yuna; Angelides; Hannibal; Joel van Djik; Pounds; Simbiatu Ajikawo	4:00
6.	"Forget About You"	Yuna; Govere; Hannibal	4:28
7.	"Likes" (with Kyle)	Yuna; Hannibal; Carl McComrick; Kyle Harvey	3:35
8.	"Amy" (with Masego)	Yuna; Brian Warfield; Maclean Robinson; Micah Davis	3:21
9.	"Does She" (with Jay Park)	Yuna; Michelle Buzz; Hannibal; Samuel Farrar; Rami Samir Jrade; Park Jae-beom	3:22
10.	"Forevermore"	Yuna; Govere; Hannibal	3:53
11.	"Tiada Akhir" (Malay; "No End")	Yuna; Hannibal	2:44
Total length:			41:30

Rouge – Japanese edition (bonus track)
No.	Title	Length
12.	"Lessons"
Total length:		44:29

== Credits and personnel ==
Credits taken from the album's liner notes.

Personnel

- Yuna - vocals
- Tyler, the Creator - vocals
- G-Eazy - vocals
- Little Simz - vocals
- Kyle - vocals
- Jay Park - vocals
- Miyavi - guitar
- Masego - background vocals, saxophone
- Robin Hannibal - background vocals, keyboards, organ, synthesizers, bass, guitar, kalimba, drums, percussion
- Brooke de la Rosa - background vocals
- Cardiak - piano, drums
- August Rosenbaum - piano
- Julian-Quan Viet Le - keyboards
- Joel van Dijk - guitars
- Danny McKinnon - guitars
- Thomas Drayton - bass
- Todd Simon - trumpet
- Ibrahim Maalouf - trumpet
- Simon Huber - cello
- Ginny Luke - violin

Technicals

- Arrangements by Robin Hannibal
  - Additional arrangements by August Rosenbaum (track 11)
- Vocals recorded by Davey Donaldson at Independently Popular and Robin Hannibal at Hannibal's House
  - Additional recording by Joshua Sellers, Josh Flores and Thomas Cullison at Chalice Studios (track 10)
  - Additional recording by Fisticuffs and Christian Plata (track 8)
- Instrumentation recorded at Hannibal's Room
  - Additional instrumentation recorded by J.LBS at 10603 Studios (track 4)
  - Additional piano recorded by Chris Tabron at Red Bull Studios (track 11)
- Vocal production by Robin Hannibal
  - Additional vocal production by Rex Rideout (tracks 1, 3 & 4–8)
  - Additional vocal production by Robert Castillo (tracks 2 & 3)
- Mixed by Stan Greene at Arketek Studios (tracks 1, 3–8 & 11) and Eric Madrid at Sonic Element Studios (tracks 2, 9 & 10)
- Assistant mixed by William Binderup
- Mastered by Chris Gehringer at Sterling Sound, New York
- All tracks produced by Robin Hannibal except "Likes" co-produced by Cardiak, "Teenage Heartbreak" produced by J.LBS and "Amy" by Fisticuffs.
- Robbin Hannibal & Benjamin Willis - executive producer
- Indie-Pop - management
- Dahlia Ambach-Chaplin & Benjamin Willis - A&R
- Natalie Weber - A&R manager
- Melody Ewing & Femi Onafowokan - A&R administration
- Adam Lekach - marketing
- Tom Arndt - production
- Julie Johantgen - release coordination
- Yunalis Zara'ai & KyleDidThis - creative direction
- Steven Taylor - photography
- Jacob Lerman - design

== Charts ==
Chart (2019)	Peak position
US Heatseekers Albums (Billboard)	18

== Release history ==
Country	Release date	Format	Label
Worldwide	July 12, 2019	CD, LP, Digital download	Verve Forecast, UMG
