= Teflon Don (song) =

2024 song by Future

Song by Future

from the album Mixtape Pluto
- Released: September 20, 2024
- Genre: Trap
- Length: 2:39
- Label: Freebandz; Epic
- Songwriters: Nayvadius Wilburn; Nicolas Berlinger; Joshua Luellen; London Holmes; Mateen Niknam; DeAvonte Kimble; Giovanni Rinaldi
- Producers: Southside; London on da Track; AyoPeeb; Topp; FBG Goat; Desro; MoXart Beatz

"Teflon Don" is a song by American rapper Future from his seventeenth mixtape Mixtape Pluto (2024). It was produced by Southside, London on da Track, AyoPeeb, Topp, FBG Goat, Desro and MoXart Beatz. The song samples "Love Theme from The Godfather".

== Composition ==
The song opens with the theme from the 1972 film The Godfather, preceding a trap instrumental. Future also references his line on "Bugatti" by Ace Hood.

== Critical reception ==
Gabriel Bras Nevares of HotNewHipHop remarked that the song "stuns with its in-and-out operatic samples (plus a dynamic vocal delivery)". Paul A. Thompson of Pitchfork wrote that the song's "stretches" have "fine-watch precision" and "are meant to be purely percussive".

== Charts ==
Chart performance for "Teflon Don"
Chart (2024)	Peak position
Canada Hot 100 (Billboard)	53
New Zealand Hot Singles (RMNZ)	2
Global 200 (Billboard)	39
UK Singles (OCC)	54
US Billboard Hot 100	21
US Hot R&B/Hip-Hop Songs (Billboard)	3
