= Lil Demon =

2024 song by Future

Song by Future

from the album Mixtape Pluto
- Released: September 20, 2024
- Length: 2:19
- Label: Freebandz; Epic
- Songwriters: Nayvadius Wilburn; Joshua Luellen; Matthew-Kyle Brown
- Producers: Southside; Smatt Sertified

"Lil Demon" is a song by American rapper Future from his seventeenth mixtape Mixtape Pluto (2024). It was produced by Southside and Smatt Sertified.

== Background ==
On the night of September 2, 2024, Future previewed the song on social media.

== Critical reception ==
Gabriel Bras Nevares of HotNewHipHop regarded the song as one of the "so-so records" of the first five tracks in Mixtape Pluto which "lose their value when stacked up against better cuts in that same section." Reviewing the mixtape for Pitchfork, Paul A. Thompson wrote "When he slips into slow, languid flows, as he does on 'Lil Demon' and 'Plutoski,' the writing is laid bare—and is revealed, virtually without exception, as incisive and sometimes shockingly self-critical." Aaron Williams of Uproxx commented, "The hypnotic, chant-like choruses? They're represented here on tracks like 'Lil Demon' and 'Aye Say Gang.' The rapping is as crisp as it's ever been."

== Charts ==
=== Weekly charts ===
Weekly chart performance for "Lil Demon"
Chart (2024)	Peak position
Canada Hot 100 (Billboard)	59
New Zealand Hot Singles (RMNZ)	3
Global 200 (Billboard)	46
UK Singles (OCC)	99
US Billboard Hot 100	25
US Hot R&B/Hip-Hop Songs (Billboard)	5

=== Year-end charts ===
Year-end chart performance for "Lil Demon"
Chart (2025)	Position
US Hot R&B/Hip-Hop Songs (Billboard)	71
