= Plutoski =

2024 song by Future

Song by Future

from the album Mixtape Pluto
- Released: September 20, 2024
- Length: 2:59
- Label: Freebandz; Epic
- Songwriters: Nayvadius Wilburn; Joshua Luellen; Wesley Glass; Lucas DePante; James Brown
- Producers: Wheezy; Southside; Juke Wong

"Plutoski" is a song by American rapper Future from his seventeenth mixtape Mixtape Pluto (2024). Produced by Wheezy, Southside and Juke Wong, it samples "I Got You (I Feel Good)" by James Brown.

== Critical reception ==
The song received generally mixed reviews from critics. Robin Murray of Clash described it as "stumbling" and that it "seems formless". Gary Suarez of Vulture commented "The utterly incoherent 'Plutoski' sounds like a rough demo, with a vocal take that seems like it was recorded from the bottom of a double cup." Alexander Cole of HotNewHipHop wrote "One track that seems to be getting attention is 'Plutoski.' Once you hear this track, you will understand why this has been the case so far. It features some wild flows from Future, and one particular vocal quirk that has proven to be quite polarizing. Some are saying he's a genius for it, others are calling him washed. But that is the beauty of Future. He tries new things, regardless of what the backlash might be." Reviewing Mixtape Pluto for HotNewHipHop, Gabriel Bras Nevares stated "As cringe as many find Future's chorus on 'PLUTOSKI,' and as much as that instrumental deserved better, it's actually one of the most fun parts of the mixtape, thanks to ditching the self-serious attitude." Paul A. Thompson of Pitchfork wrote, "When he slips into slow, languid flows, as he does on 'Lil Demon' and 'Plutoski,' the writing is laid bare—and is revealed, virtually without exception, as incisive and sometimes shockingly self-critical."

== Charts ==
Chart performance for "Plutoski"
Chart (2024)	Peak position
Canada Hot 100 (Billboard)	78
Global 200 (Billboard)	69
US Billboard Hot 100	29
US Hot R&B/Hip-Hop Songs (Billboard)	7
