= Sweetest Girl (Dollar Bill) =

Single by Wyclef Jean featuring Akon, Lil Wayne and Niia

from the album Carnival Vol. II: Memoirs of an Immigrant
- Released: August 14, 2007
- Recorded: 2007
- Genre: R&B, hip hop, reggae fusion
- Length: 3:59
- Label: Columbia
- Songwriters: Wyclef Jean; Aliaune Thiam; Dwayne Carter; Dennis Coles; Devon Golder; Gary Grice; Jason Hunter; Jerry Duplessis; K. Lancaster; Lamont Coleman; Robert Diggs; Isaac Hayes
- Producers: Jean; Duplessis; Lamont "LOGiC" Coleman; Golder

Wyclef Jean singles chronology
"You Know What It Is" (2007)	"Sweetest Girl (Dollar Bill)" (2007)	"Dar um Jeito (We Will Find a Way)" (2014)

Akon singles chronology
"Sorry, Blame It on Me" (2007)	"Sweetest Girl (Dollar Bill)" (2007)	"Am I Dreaming" (2007)

Lil Wayne singles chronology
"Duffle Bag Boy" (2007)	"Sweetest Girl (Dollar Bill)" (2007)	"100 Million" (2007)

Niia singles chronology
"Sweetest Girl (Dollar Bill)" (2007)

"Sweetest Girl (Dollar Bill)" is the lead single from Haitian rapper Wyclef Jean's sixth studio album, Carnival Vol. II: Memoirs of an Immigrant. The R&B and hip hop song features vocals from Niia and Akon, as well as rapper Lil Wayne. Verizon Wireless released the song on their V CAST service on August 7, 2007. It peaked at number 12 on the Billboard Hot 100 in 2008.

== Background ==
During the chorus, Akon sings, "See I'ma tell you, like Wu told me, Cash rules everything, around me." This is actually a two-layered reference, the first to the 1994 Wu-Tang Clan song "C.R.E.A.M.", from which Akon also samples the "dolla', dolla' bill, y'all" chant from the song's chorus, and the second to "Notorious Thugs" by Bone Thugs-n-Harmony and the Notorious B.I.G., in which B.I.G. raps, "I'ma tell you like a nigga told me, Cash rules everything around me," which itself references the original Wu Tang track. Additionally, in the second verse of the song, Akon raps "They got they mind on they money, money on they mind. They got their finger on a trigger, hand on their nine", which references a Tupac Shakur verse in the MC Breed song "Gotta Get Mine" in which Shakur raps "I keep my mind on my money, money on mind. Finger on the trigger, nigga hand on my nine."

== Remixes ==
The official remix features Akon, Lil Wayne, and Raekwon of the Wu-Tang Clan. The remix further samples more of Wu-Tang Clan's song "C.R.E.A.M." and switches between the original "C.R.E.A.M." instrumental and the intro instrumental of "C.R.E.A.M.". Akon's & Wyclef's verses are switched on the remix. Singer Niia is featured and credited on the remix, but doesn't sing anything on it. On the second line before the ending of the outro, Wyclef says Raekwon's name on the line, "Tonight Wyclef, ____, Weezy on the bill", replacing Akon's name from the original version's outro. Rapper Nicki Minaj recorded a remix which was featured on her 2008 mixtape Sucka Free. In this remix, Nicki removes Lil Wayne's verse, replacing it with a verse from herself.

== Music video ==
The music video, directed by Chris Robinson, is mainly set in a refugee camp. At the beginning of the video, Wyclef Jean is given the mission to prevent the video's lead female Aya Bungo (played by model/activist Gloria Mika) from being deported back to her home country, which is said to be hostile. Akon and Lil' Wayne are also featured as they also seemingly await possible deportation. After a short wait, Aya is informed that she will be deported. Soon after, she sets the camp ablaze and Jean, attempting to reach her, overpowers a guard and ultimately rescues her. Both leap off camera as the camp erupts in flame. The video for the remix premiered on November 27, 2007 on Wyclef Jean's YouTube account.

== Track listing ==
German CD1

1. "Sweetest Girl (Dollar Bill)" (Album Version)
2. "Sweetest Girl (Dollar Bill)" (Remix Featuring Raekwon)

German CD2

1. "Sweetest Girl (Dollar Bill)" (Album Version)
2. "Fast Car"
3. "Sweetest Girl (Dollar Bill)" (Remix Featuring Raekwon)
4. "Sweetest Girl (Dollar Bill)" (Ringtone)

== Chart performance ==
The song has peaked at number 12 on the Billboard charts. On August 23, 2007, the song debuted on the Canadian Hot 100 at number 42 and later on peaked at number 14. On that same day it made its first appearance on the Billboard charts, on the Bubbling Under Hot 100 at number three. In New Zealand the single debuted at number 39 on the week of October 22. The following week, the song jumped to number 17. Now it is at number 8, solely off downloads. The single has peaked at 66 so far in the UK. The song didn't chart in Australia until May 2008, reaching its peak of number 28 in July.

The song's appearance in the Billboard year-end marked Wyclef Jean's first appearance there in ten years.

=== Weekly charts ===
Chart (2007–2008)	Peak position
Australia (ARIA)	28
Austria (Ö3 Austria Top 40)	64
Canada Hot 100 (Billboard)	14
CIS Airplay (TopHit); G.M. & F.E. Fuzion remix	145
Germany (GfK)	30
Hungary (Rádiós Top 40)	14
Italy (FIMI)	45
New Zealand (Recorded Music NZ)	8
Norway (VG-lista)	17
Romania (Romanian Top 100)	48
Sweden (Sverigetopplistan)	15
Switzerland (Schweizer Hitparade)	26
UK Singles (The Official Charts Company)	66
US Billboard Hot 100	12
US Pop Airplay (Billboard)	10

=== Year-end charts ===
Chart (2008)	Position
Canada (Canadian Hot 100)	67
Hungary (Rádiós Top 40)	33
US Billboard Hot 100	56

== Certifications ==
Region	Certification	Certified units/sales
Canada (Music Canada)	Gold	20,000^{*}
New Zealand (RMNZ)	2× Platinum	60,000^{‡}
United States (RIAA)	Platinum	1,000,000^{*}
United States (RIAA) Mastertone	Gold	500,000^{*}
^{*} Sales figures based on certification alone.^{‡} Sales+streaming figures based on certification alone.
