= Ski (Future song) =

2024 song by Future

Song by Future

from the album Mixtape Pluto
- Released: September 20, 2024
- Length: 2:27
- Label: Freebandz; Epic
- Songwriters: Nayvadius Wilburn; Joshua Luellen; Matthew-Kyle Brown; Lychkin Vladimirovich
- Producers: Southside; Smatt Sertified; Gedo

"Ski" is a song by American rapper Future from his seventeenth mixtape Mixtape Pluto (2024). It was produced by Southside, Smatt Sertified and Gedo.

== Critical reception ==
Tom Breihan of Stereogum stated, "If you want to hear Future really lock in and attack a beat, go directly to 'Ski.'" Gabriel Bras Nevares of HotNewHipHop remarked, "Future's a bullet train on 'SKI'". Paul A. Thompson of Pitchfork wrote, "The way the tension-release cycles play out in smaller and smaller concentric circles through the verses on 'Ski' has fine-watch precision".

== Charts ==
Chart performance for "Ski"
Chart (2024)	Peak position
Canada Hot 100 (Billboard)	73
New Zealand Hot Singles (RMNZ)	7
Global 200 (Billboard)	56
US Billboard Hot 100	26
US Hot R&B/Hip-Hop Songs (Billboard)	6
