= 4x4 (song) =

2025 single by Travis Scott

Single by Travis Scott
- Released: January 24, 2025
- Recorded: 2024
- Genre: Trap
- Length: 3:11
- Label: Cactus Jack; Epic
- Songwriters: Jacques Webster II; Brytavious Chambers; Michael Mulé; Isaac de Boni; Carlton Mays, Jr.; Douglas Ford
- Producers: Tay Keith; FnZ

Travis Scott singles chronology
"South of France" (Remix) (2024)	"4x4" (2025)	"ILMB" (2025)

Music video
- "4x4" on YouTube

"4x4" is a song by American rapper and singer Travis Scott. It was released as a single through Cactus Jack and Epic Records on January 24, 2025. Scott wrote the song with producers Tay Keith and FnZ (Finatik and Zac), alongside Dougie F, with additional writing credits going to Honorable C.N.O.T.E., as the song samples the 2016 Tennessee State University marching band playing an instrumental version of the song "Say Sum" by Migos. Mike Dean mixed and mastered it, with Tommy Rush providing assistance in mixing.

== Background and promotion ==
The song was first played through the speakers during Scott's performance at a nightclub called the Joy Room in Mexico City on September 22, 2024. The song was further teased on October 18 on an episode of WWE SmackDown when WWE Superstar Roman Reigns had a file of the song in advance. Scott performed it live for the first time during the final show of his Circus Maximus Tour at Eden Park in Auckland, New Zealand on October 30. He then performed a shortened version of it during his headlining performance at the Rolling Loud music festival on December 14. On January 6, 2025, Scott appeared in-person at WWE Raw's premiere on Netflix, in which the song's title was revealed and it was confirmed to serve as the program's opening theme. He performed the song at the 2025 College Football Playoff National Championship during the halftime show on January 20. On the same day, he shared a link to pre-save the song and restocked new merchandise on his website, in which all the proceeds would support people who were affected by the 2025 California wildfires.

== Music video ==
A music video was released on January 24, 2025. It was directed by Gabriel Moses and filmed in Scott's hometown of Houston, Texas.

Critics have described the video as chaotic, high-energy, and possessing a surreal, fever-dream-like quality. It features imagery related to Texas (such as the state flag, cowboys, military personnel, and marching bands) consistent with Scott's "Cactus Jack" cowboy aesthetics, alongside wrestling and superhero themes. The visuals make use of black-and-white colors and vintage film effects.

The video opens with an altered version of the Columbia Pictures logo in which the Torch Lady flips off the camera.

== Release ==
"4x4" was released by Cactus Jack and Epic Records on January 24, 2025. It was released on limited edition compact disc (CD) on the same day.

== Commercial performance ==
"4x4" debuted at number one on the Billboard Hot 100 dated February 8, 2025 (with 16.2 million streams, 2.9 million airplay audience, and 167,000 sold), giving Scott his fifth number-one single in the country. The following week, it registered the biggest drop from number one by plummeting down to number 57, surpassing Jimin's "Like Crazy" (which had descended to 45). The song spent four total weeks on the chart, tying 6ix9ine and Nicki Minaj's "Trollz" as the second fastest number-one song to depart from the chart.

== Charts ==
=== Weekly charts ===
Weekly chart performance for "4x4"
Chart (2025)	Peak position
Australia (ARIA)	53
Australia Hip Hop/R&B (ARIA)	8
Austria (Ö3 Austria Top 40)	12
Canada Hot 100 (Billboard)	24
Czech Republic Singles Digital (ČNS IFPI)	30
France (SNEP)	75
Germany (GfK)	20
Global 200 (Billboard)	18
Greece International (IFPI)	13
Ireland (IRMA)	47
Italy (FIMI)	54
Latvia Streaming (LaIPA)	7
Lithuania (AGATA)	40
Luxembourg (Billboard)	14
Netherlands (Single Top 100)	65
New Zealand (Recorded Music NZ)	30
Nicaragua Anglo Airplay (Monitor Latino)	4
Nigeria (TurnTable Top 100)	74
Norway (VG-lista)	35
Poland (Polish Streaming Top 100)	15
Slovakia Singles Digital (ČNS IFPI)	18
Sweden (Sverigetopplistan)	97
Switzerland (Schweizer Hitparade)	10
UK Singles (OCC)	23
UK Hip Hop/R&B (OCC)	5
US Billboard Hot 100	1
US Hot R&B/Hip-Hop Songs (Billboard)	1
US Rhythmic Airplay (Billboard)	10

=== Year-end charts ===
Year-end chart performance for "4x4"
Chart (2025)	Position
US Hot R&B/Hip-Hop Songs (Billboard)	53

== Certifications ==
Certifications for "4x4"
Region	Certification	Certified units/sales
United States (RIAA)	Gold	500,000^{‡}
^{‡} Sales+streaming figures based on certification alone.
