= Ocean (Future song) =

2024 song by Future

Song by Future

from the album Mixtape Pluto
- Released: September 20, 2024
- Length: 3:23
- Label: Freebandz; Epic
- Songwriters: Nayvadius Wilburn; Wesley Glass; Carlton Mays Jr.; Dylan Cleary-Krell; Abraham Herrera; Ciaran Mullan
- Producers: Wheezy; Honorable C.N.O.T.E.; Dez Wright; Jack Uriah; Mu Lean

"Ocean" is a song by American rapper Future from his seventeenth mixtape Mixtape Pluto (2024). It was produced by Wheezy, Honorable C.N.O.T.E., Dez Wright, Jack Uriah and Mu Lean.

== Critical reception ==
Robin Murray of Clash remarked, "the cataclysmic 'Ocean' boasts stadium-worthy endeavours." Gabriel Bras Nevares of HotNewHipHop commented the song "could've been a more outstanding highlight if it wasn't for the overwhelming bass tone." Paul A. Thompson of Pitchfork described the song as "private dread blown up to Gothic dimensions", in regard to production.

== Charts ==
Chart performance for "Ocean"
| Chart (2024) | Peak position |
|---|---|
| Global 200 (Billboard) | 146 |
| US Billboard Hot 100 | 46 |
| US Hot R&B/Hip-Hop Songs (Billboard) | 12 |
