= Niia =

American singer (born 1988)

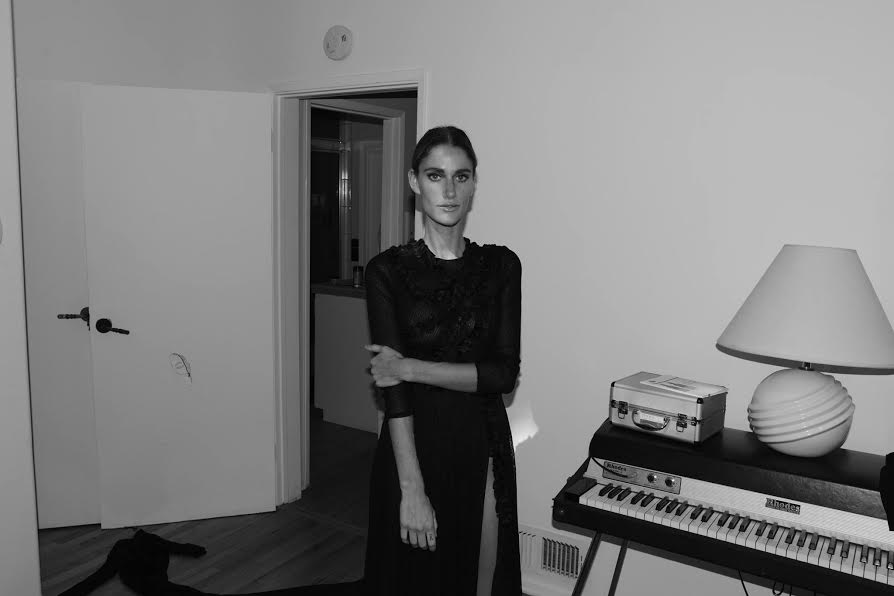

Background information
- Also known as: Niia
- Born: Niia Bertino; July 11, 1988 (age 38)
- Origin: Needham, Massachusetts, U.S.
- Genres: Sophisti-pop; Alternative R&B
- Occupations: Singer, songwriter, pianist
- Instruments: Vocals, piano
- Years active: 2007–present
- Label: Something Local
- Website: www.niiamusic.com www.facebook.com/NiiaMusic

Niia Bertino (born July 11, 1988), known professionally as Niia, is an American singer, pianist, and songwriter.

== Early life ==
Niia was born in Needham, Massachusetts, and was trained by her mother in classical piano and began singing and performing at the age of 13. Bertino's mother hails from Italy and is the daughter of an opera singer, while her extended family boasts many vocalists trained at the Juilliard School. She was invited to attend the Berklee College of Music summer program at age fourteen. After high school, which she attended at Newton Country Day School of the Sacred Heart in Newton, MA, Niia moved to New York City where she briefly attended the New School for Jazz and Contemporary Music as a Jazz vocal major. She later settled in Los Angeles.

== Career ==
While living in New York, Niia met singer, songwriter and producer Wyclef Jean. After working with Wyclef and producer Jerry Wonda, Niia was a featured artist on 2007 single, "Sweetest Girl (Dollar Bill)", which also featured Lil' Wayne and Akon. The song peaked at number twelve on the U.S. Billboard Hot 100 after fifteen weeks on the chart and was RIAA certified Platinum.

Niia has toured around the world and performed on programs such as VH1 Soul Stage, the Late Show with David Letterman, Jimmy Kimmel Live!, The Late Late Show with Craig Ferguson, the BET Awards and MTV New Year's Eve in Times Square.

In 2011, Niia began performing The Best of 007 in New York. Backed by a 14-piece orchestra, Niia paid homage to the soundtrack of James Bond films including classics "Goldfinger", "Thunderball", and "The Spy Who Loved Me". She has also released covers of the classic track Mad World by Tears for Fears, Jai Paul's viral hit BTSTU, and Cher's Bang Bang (My Baby Shot Me Down).

In February 2013, Niia self-released her single "Made For You" and premiered the video, directed by American History X director Tony Kaye, on The Fader. In October 2013, Bertino was the presenter of a TED Talk titled Beauty Overcomes Fear at the annual TEDxOrangeCoast event.

She teamed up with Robin Hannibal on music in preparation for her debut EP Generation Blue, released on October 28, 2014. In 2015, Bertino, alongside Josef Salvat, was featured on Tourist's single "Holding On".

In June 2016, she released a new single "Bored To Death" which was premiered by Zane Lowe on his Beats 1 radio show.

Niia's second album, II: La Bella Vita, was released in 2020. Matt Moen, writing for Paper, reported, "Feelings of anger, betrayal, resentment and doubt pop up as common themes across the album as Niia funnels heartbreak into her jazzy vocals."

If I Should Die, an EP released in 2021, featured the single "Not Up for Discussion." The track was an "anti-anthem, declaring that however one wants to use their time is fine by her," as reported by American Songwriter.

The label OFFAIR released Niia's Mouthful of Salt in 2022.

Niia's fourth album, Bobby Deerfield, was released in 2023. Lauren Hicks, writing for Atwood Magazine, compared the album's first single, "Alfa Romeo," to "Interstellar Overdrive" by Pink Floyd.

Her fifth album, V, appeared on the jazz label Candid Records in 2025. The cover art featured Niia strapped to a heretic's fork.

Niia co-hosts a podcast about The Sopranos.

== Awards ==
In 2005, Niia was selected by the National Foundation for the Advancement of the Arts as one of the top 100 singers in the country, and the national winner in the jazz voice category National Foundation for Advancement in the Arts Recognition and Talent Search.

== Discography ==
=== Albums ===
Year	Album details	Peak chart positions	
Year	Album details	US	UK
2017	I: Release date: May 5, 2017; Label: Atlantic	—	—
2020	II: La Bella Vita: Release date: February 14, 2020; Label: NIIAROCCO LLC	—	—
2021	If I Should Die: Release date: June 4, 2021; Label: NIIAROCCO LLC	—	—
2022	OFFAIR: Mouthful of Salt: Release date: April 8, 2022; Label: NIIAROCCO LLC	—	—
2023	Bobby Deerfield: Release date: June 23, 2023; Label: NIIAROCCO LLC	—	—

=== Extended plays ===
Year	Album details	Peak chart positions	
Year	Album details	US	UK
2014	Generation Blue: Release date: October 28, 2014; Label: Something Local	—	—

=== Singles ===
Year	Title	Peak chart positions		Album
Year	Title	US	UK	Album
2013	Made for You	—	—	non-album single
2015	David's House	—	—	non-album single
2016	Bored To Death	—	—	non-album single
2016	Last Night In Los Feliz	—	—	I
2017	Hurt You First	—	—	I
2017	Sideline	—	—	I
2017	Nobody	—	—	I
2019	Face	—	—	II: La Bella Vita
2019	If I Cared	—	—	II: La Bella Vita
2019	Whatever You Got	—	—	II: La Bella Vita
2020	Obsession	—	—	II: La Bella Vita
2020	La Bella Vita	—	—	II: La Bella Vita
2021	Not Up For Discussion	—	—	If I Should Die
2021	We Were Never Friends	—	—	If I Should Die
2021	If I Should Die	—	—	If I Should Die
2021	Macaroni Salad	—	—	If I Should Die

=== Featured singles ===
Year	Title	Chart positions				Album
Year	Title	U.S. Hot 100	U.S. Pop 100	UK Singles Chart	CAN Hot 100	Album
2007	"Sweetest Girl (Dollar Bill)" (Wyclef Jean featuring Akon, Lil Wayne and Niia)	12	10	66	14	Carnival Vol. II: Memoirs of an Immigrant
2015	"Holding On" (Tourist featuring Josef Salvat and Niia)	–	–	–	–	

== Music videos ==
=== As lead artist ===
Year	Album	Title	Director
2013	—N/a	"Made For You"	Tony Kaye
2013	Generation Blue	"Generation Blue"	Dan Monick
2014	Generation Blue	"David's House"	Dan Monick

=== As featured artist ===
Year	Album	Title	Director
2007	Carnival Vol. II: Memoirs of an Immigrant	"Sweetest Girl (Dollar Bill)" (Wyclef Jean featuring Akon, Lil Wayne and Niia)	Chris Robinson
2015		"Holding On" (Tourist featuring Josef Salvat and Niia)	Holly Blakey
