= South of France (song) =

2024 single by Future

- Remix cover art

Single by Future or remix with Travis Scott

from the album Mixtape Pluto and Freebandz Presents: The Music Tape
- Released: September 20, 2024 (original); November 1, 2024 (remix)
- Recorded: 2024
- Genre: Trap
- Length: 1:48 (original); 3:04 (remix)
- Label: Wilburn Holding; Epic
- Songwriters: Nayvadius Wilburn; Jacques Webster II (remix only); Wesley Glass; Joshua Luellen; Carlton McDowell, Jr.
- Producers: Wheezy; Southside; Carlton

Future singles chronology
| "Most Beautiful Design" (2024) | "South of France" (2024) | "Loko" (2024) |

Travis Scott singles chronology
| "Drugs You Should Try It" (2024) | "South of France" (Remix) (2024) | "4x4" (2025) |

Visualizer
- "South of France" on YouTube

"South of France" is a song by American rapper Future. It was released through Wilburn Holding Co and Epic Records as the eleventh track from his seventeenth mixtape, Mixtape Pluto, on September 20, 2024. Future wrote the song with producers Wheezy, Southside, and Carlton. He released a remix in collaboration with fellow American rapper and singer Travis Scott on November 1, 2024, which was when the song became the second and final single from the mixtape after being added to a reissued version of it.

== Release and promotion ==
On September 6, 2024, Scott took to Twitter to tease a snippet of the song through a video of him on a yacht with Future, producer Southside, and fellow American rapper Lil Baby. However, when the song was released exactly two weeks later as part of Mixtape Pluto, Scott was not a part of the song. On October 29, 2024, Future announced that he would be releasing a remix that in collaboration with Scott three days later. (Future Twitter) Scott adds a verse to the song along with some background vocals before it ends with another chorus by Future.

== Critical reception ==
Reviewing Mixtape Pluto, Gabriel Bras Nevares of HotNewHipHop commented that Future "stretches himself out on 'SOUTH OF FRANCE' without losing control of the wheel". Writing for Pitchfork, Paul A. Thompson cited "South of France" as "the clearest example" for which "the beats on Mixtape Pluto (led by Southside and Wheezy, though numerous tracks have two or more co-producers) offer a new way forward for Future by tying together disparate threads from his early career" and further described it as "a wistful but anvil-heavy missive that locates the intersection of "Bugatti" and "U.O.E.N.O.," marrying 808 Mafia-style maximalism to the slyer, woozier style that competed with it for airtime in the early 2010s".

== Charts ==
Chart performance for "South of France"
| Chart (2024) | Peak position |
|---|---|
| Canada Hot 100 (Billboard) | 93 |
| US Billboard Hot 100 | 57 |
| US Hot R&B/Hip-Hop Songs (Billboard) | 16 |

Chart performance for "South of France" (Remix)
| Chart (2024) | Peak position |
|---|---|
| New Zealand Hot Singles (RMNZ) | 6 |
