= Avalanche (Quadron album) =

Studio album by Quadron
- Released: 31 May 2013
- Genres: Soul, pop
- Labels: Vested in Culture, Epic
- Producers: Robin Hannibal, Fraser T Smith, Derek Ali, Sylvia Rhone (exec.), Tricky Stewart (exec.)

Quadron chronology
Quadron (2009)	Avalanche (2013)

Singles from Avalanche
- 1. "Hey Love" Released: 1 March 2013; 2. "Favorite Star" Released: 3 June 2013; 3. "LFT" Released: 11 November 2013

Professional ratings
Aggregate scores
Source	Rating
Metacritic	72/100
Review scores
Source	Rating
Allmusic	4.5/5 stars
AMPYA	(7/10)
eMusic	4/5 stars
Exclaim!	9/10
Filter	4/5 stars
Now	4/5 stars
Pitchfork Media	(7/10)
Popmatters	(7/10)
Rolling Stone	3.5/5 stars
Today	3.5/5 stars

Avalanche is the second studio album by Danish soul pop duo Quadron. It was released on 31 May 2013 through Vested in Culture and Epic Records. Upon its release, Avalanche received positive reviews from music critics.

== Reception ==
At Metacritic, which assigns a normalized rating out of 100 to reviews from mainstream critics, the album received an average score of 72, which indicates "generally favorable reviews", based on nine reviews.

== Commercial performance ==
Despite its positive reception, the album was a relative commercial failure, only peaking at number 115 on the Billboard 200 in the United States. In the group's native Denmark the album achieved greater commercial success, spending 12 weeks in the top 10 of the charts and was eventually certified gold for 10,000 copies sold.

== Track listing ==
No.	Title	Writer(s)	Producer(s)	Length
1.	"LFT"	Cecilie Maja Hastrup Karshøj, Robin Hannibal	Hannibal, Kuk Harrell^{[a]}	3:29
2.	"Favorite Star"	Karshøj, Hannibal	Hannibal, Harrell^{[a]}	3:21
3.	"Hey Love"	Hannibal, Karshøj, Fraser T Smith, Ali Tamposi	Smith, Hannibal, Harrell^{[a]}	3:23
4.	"Crush"	Karshøj, Hannibal	Hannibal	3:44
5.	"Befriend"	Karshøj, Hannibal, August Rosenbaum	Hannibal	4:16
6.	"Neverland"	Karshøj, Hannibal	Hannibal	3:38
7.	"It's Gonna Get You"	Karshøj, Hannibal, Rosenbaum	Hannibal, Harrell^{[a]}	3:26
8.	"Better Off" (featuring Kendrick Lamar)	Karshøj, Hannibal, Kendrick Duckworth	Hannibal, Derek "MixedByAli" Ali	4:24
9.	"Sea Salt"	Karshøj, Hannibal, Rosenbaum	Hannibal	3:08
10.	"Avalanche"	Karshøj, Hannibal	Hannibal	3:45

iTunes Store additional track
No.	Title	Writer(s)	Length
11.	"Something That You Like"	Karshøj, Hannibal, Om'Mas Keith	4:08

Notes

- ^{^[a]} signifies a vocal producer

== Personnel ==
Credits adapted from Allmusic.

- Marcel Camargo - guitar
- Derek "MixedByAli" Ali – arrangement, engineer, producer
- Anita Marisa Boriboon – design
- Delbert Bowers – mixing assistant
- Pablo Calogero – baritone saxophone
- Errol Cooney – guitar
- Claire Courchene – cello
- Thomas Drayton – bass
- Fraser T Smith – composer, drums, percussion, piano, producer
- Chris Galland – mixing assistant
- Robin Hannibal – arrangement, composer, engineer, instrumentation, mixing assistant, producer
- Kuk Harrell – engineer, vocal engineer, vocal producer
- Eliot Hazel – photography
- Hans Hvidberg – drums
- Peter Jacobsen – cello
- Coco O. – art direction, composer, lyrics, vocals
- Dave Kutch – mastering
- Kendrick Lamar – composer
- Elizabeth Lea – trombone
- Tom Lea – viola, violin
- Dan Lead – guitar, pedal steel guitar
- Alan Lightner – steel drums
- Manny Marroquin – mixing
- Gloria Noto – make-up
- Chris "Tek" O'Ryan – engineer
- Sylvia Rhone – executive producer
- August Rosenbaum – composer, keyboards, organ, synthesizer
- John Ruggiero – hair stylist
- Andrew Schwartz – engineer
- Todd Simon – flugelhorn, trumpet
- Tricky Stewart – executive producer
- Ali Tamposi – composer
- Marcos Tovar – engineer
- Steven Valenzuela – engineer
- Tracy Wannomae – clarinet, flute, saxophone

== Chart positions ==
Chart (2013)	Peak position
Danish Albums (Hitlisten)	3
US Billboard 200	115
US Top R&B/Hip-Hop Albums	16
US Heatseekers Albums (Billboard)	1

== Certifications ==
Region	Certification	Certified units/sales
Denmark (IFPI Danmark)	Platinum	20,000^{‡}
^{‡} Sales+streaming figures based on certification alone.

== Release history ==
List of release dates, with country released, format, record label and edition
Country	Date	Format(s)	Label
Germany	31 May 2013	Digital download	Vested in Culture, Epic Records
Denmark	3 June 2013	CD, digital download	Vested in Culture, Epic Records
United States	June 4, 2013	CD, digital download	Vested in Culture, Epic Records
Germany	14 June 2013	CD	Vested in Culture, Epic Records
