= Quadron (album) =

Studio album by Quadron
- Released: 2009
- Genre: Soul, pop

Quadron chronology
Quadron (2009)	Avalanche (2013)

Quadron is the first studio album by Danish soul pop duo Quadron.

== Track listing ==
No.	Title	Length
1.	"Buster Keaton"	3:49
2.	"Slippin'"	4:15
3.	"Day"	3:17
4.	"Jeans"	3:24
5.	"Pressure"	3:21
6.	"Horse"	3:48
7.	"Average Fruit"	4:29
8.	"Unpatience"	3:50
9.	"Far Cry"	4:58
10.	"Tone"	2:08
11.	"Simili Life"	4:00
12.	"Herfra Hvor Vi Står"	4:43
