= Coco O. =

Danish musician (born 1987)

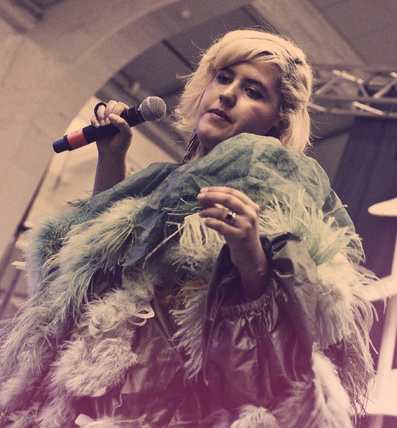
- Coco O. performing with Quadron in 2010

Background information
- Born: Cecilie Maja Hastrup Karshøj; 1987 or 1988 (age 38–39); Copenhagen, Denmark
- Genres: Soul, electronic, pop
- Occupation: Singer-songwriter
- Instrument: Vocals
- Years active: 2009–present
- Formerly of: Quadron

Cecilie Maja Hastrup Karshøj, known professionally as Coco O., is a Danish musician best known as the singer in electronic soul duo Quadron. She released her debut album It's a Process in 2021.

== Early life ==
Cecilie Maja Hastrup Karshøj was born and raised in Copenhagen, Denmark. Her father is biracial of Tanzanian descent.

Karshøj began singing in kindergarten and aspired to sing professionally from childhood. She first realized that her voice was received positively by others during a secondary school performance of a Bill Withers song. She names Michael Jackson and Lauryn Hill as early inspirations. Karshøj's grandfather was a jazz musician.

== Career ==
=== Quadron ===
Performing under the name Coco O., she formed the duo Quadron with Robin Hannibal of Rhye in 2009. The word Quadron comes from archaic Danish "kvadron", a term used to signify persons of "quarter" race, and refers to the fact that both musicians have a biracial parent. Coco O. was the duo's singer and moved to Los Angeles after the release of their debut album. Her voice was referred to by Pitchfork as "sweetly soulful."

=== Solo work ===
Jay-Z selected Coco O. to contribute the song "Where the Wind Blows" to the soundtrack for Baz Luhrmann's The Great Gatsby. She has also worked with Pharrell Williams and provided featured vocals for Tyler, the Creator, Vulfpeck and Joey Dosik.

In 2015 she released her first solo single, "Hardest Thing." Coco O. moved back to Denmark in 2018 and released her debut solo project Dolceacqua on 25 May 2018. The two-song EP has a bossa nova sound. The album was written for an ex-boyfriend and named after the small Italian village where they fell in love. ColorsxStudios described it as "featuring mellow, acoustic guitar accompanied by rich, cinematic strings" and noted the sound is a departure from her previous work with Quadron.

On 30 April 2021 she released her first solo album It's a Process. Zo of Okayplayer heralded the album as "a stunningly intimate showcase of the singer’s voice across a range of compositions pulling from all eras of r&b and soul."

== Other ventures ==
Coco O. appeared as a contestant on dancing competition TV series Vild med dans in 2019. She and her partner Morten Kjeldgaard finished in second place.

== Discography ==
=== Albums ===
Title	Album details	Peak chart positions	Certifications
Title	Album details	DEN	Certifications
It's a Process	Release: 30 April 2021; Label: Sony Music, Coco O. Productions; Format: Digital download, streaming	27	IFPI DEN: Gold

=== EPs ===
Title	EP details
Dolceaqua	Release: 25 May 2018; Label: Coco O. Productions; Format: Digital download; Tracklist: "Bled for You"; "A Minor Detail"
Eternal, Pt. I	Release: 26 October 2018; Label: Coco O. Productions; Format: Digital download; Tracklist: "1000 Times; "Know It"; "Hardest Thing"

=== with Quadron ===
Title	Album details	Peak chart positions		Certifications
Title	Album details	DEN	US	Certifications
Quadron	Released: 27 July 2009; Label: At:tack Music, Plug Research, Vested In Culture, Epic; Formats: Digital download, CD	31	—	
Avalanche	Released: 31 May 2013; Label: Vested In Culture, Epic, Sony Music; Formats: Digital download, CD, LP	3	115	IFPI DEN: Gold
"—" denotes items which were not released in that country or failed to chart.

=== Other appearances ===
List of other appearances
Title	Year	Album
"Løb Stop Stå" (Boom Clap Bachelors feat. Coco O.)	2011	Mellem Dine Læber
"Hey There Lonely Boy" (The Decoders feat. Coco O.)	2011	Non-album single
"Visions" (The Internet (band) feat. Coco O.)	2011	Purple Naked Ladies
"Ode to a Dream" (The Internet feat. Kilo Kish and Coco O.)	2011	Purple Naked Ladies
"Skykvinden" (Grønflammeskoven feat. Coco O.)	2011	Grønflammeskoven (Lyfbilledbog Soundtrack)
"Hos Mig Igen" (When Saints Go Machine feat. Coco O.)	2012	Non-album single
"Where the Wind Blows"	2013	The Great Gatsby: Music from Baz Luhrmann's Film
"Treehome95" (Tyler the Creator feat. Coco O. and Erykah Badu)	2013	Wolf
"Through the Night" (Cedric Gervais feat. Coco O.)	2014	Non-album single
"Looking for Lovin'" (Dragonborn feat. Coco O.)	2014	Part Of Something Bigger
"Keep Da O's" (Tyler the Creator feat. Pharrell Williams and Coco O.)	2015	Cherry Bomb
"Afterglow" (Mads Langer feat. Coco O.)	2016	Reckless Twin
"Credo, Pt. II" (August Rosenbaum feat. Coco O.)	2017	Non-album single
"Credo, Pt. II" (Live) (August Rosenbaum feat. Coco O.)	2017	Non-album single
"Business Casual" (Vulfpeck feat. Coco O.)	2017	Mr Finish Line
"Kerosene" (Phlake feat. Coco O.)	2017	Weird Invitations
"Slow Afternoon" (The Late Great Fitzcarraldos feat. Coco O.)	2017	You
"Don't Want It to Be Over" (Joey Dosik feat. Coco O.)	2018	Inside Voice
"Red Dragon" (CTM feat. Coco O.)	2018	Red Dragon
"Home" (Dragonborn feat. Coco O.)	2018	Ride Upon the Storm
