= Robin Hannibal =

Danish record producer and songwriter

- Born: Robin Hannibal Mølsted Braun
- Occupations: Record producer, songwriter
- Years active: 2003-present
- Labels: Universal Music Publishing Group

Robin Hannibal Mølsted Braun is a Danish record producer and songwriter, best known for being one half of the musical duo Quadron and for being a founding member of Rhye, which he has since left. Besides being involved in both, he is also known for producing two tracks for Little Dragon's Nabuma Rubberband and received co-writing credits for Bitch, Don't Kill My Vibe by Kendrick Lamar, as the song contained a sample of "Tiden Flyver" performed by his band Boom Clap Bachelors.

As of 2019, he has been nominated four times for Grammy Awards.

== Biography ==
Robin Hannibal is a four-time Grammy nominated producer and writer. He produced two tracks on the Grammy nominated Nabuma Rubberband album by Little Dragon, and was a co-writer on the two-time Grammy nominated album good kid, m.A.A.d city by Kendrick Lamar. He is also a co-writer on Lemon Pepper Freestyle by Drake ft. Rick Ross as well as the first track on Doja Cat's debut EP Purrr! . For the 2019 Grammy Awards, Robin has been nominated for the "Album of the Year" award for his contribution to the Black Panther Original Motion Picture Soundtrack. He co-produced and co-wrote "Bloody Waters". He was also nominated for a Latin Grammy for his work on "Mala Idea" by the artist Bruses. Robin scored the film Surrounded (2023), starring Letitia Wright, Jamie Bell, Jeffrey Donovan, Brett Gelman, and Michael K. Williams. Robin Hannibal is signed to Hipgnosis.

== Discography ==
Artist	Track	Album	Record label	Credit	Year
Princess Nokia	"Lo Siento"	Single	Arista	Writer, Producer	2023
August Rosenbaum	"East Side"	Single	Independent	Writer, Producer	2023
Leven Kali	"EEK"	Single	Independent	Writer, Producer	2022
Leven Kali	"Let It Rain"	Single	Independent	Writer, Producer	2022
Tobi Lou	"Yamaguchi"	Non-Perishable	Artclub/Empire	Writer, Producer	2022
DRAMA	"Monte Carlo"	Don't Wait Up	Independent	Writer, Producer	2022
DRAMA	"Monte Carlo Boogie Remix"	Don't Wait Up	Independent	Writer, Producer	2022
Yuna	"Summer Love"	Single	Independent	Writer, Producer	2022
Bruses	"Mala Idea"	Monstrous	Independent	Writer, Producer	2022
TOBi	"Move"	Single	RCA	Writer, Producer	2022
Janice	"My Kind of Woman"	The Playlist EP	If Music Could Talk AB	Writer, Producer	2022
August Rosenbaum	"Fiction"	Single	Independent	Writer, Producer	2022
August Rosenbaum	"Seconds"	Single	Independent	Writer, Producer	2022
August Rosenbaum	"Swim On"	Single	Independent	Writer, Producer	2022
August Rosenbaum	"Should I Be Sorry	Songs People Together	Independent	Writer, Producer	2022
August Rosenbaum	"No Label"	Songs People Together	Independent	Writer, Producer	2022
August Rosenbaum	"Selfish Kind of Love"	Songs People Together	Independent	Writer, Producer	2022
August Rosenbaum	"Empire"	Songs People Together	Independent	Writer, Producer	2022
August Rosenbaum	"Revolve"	Songs People Together	Independent	Writer, Producer	2022
August Rosenbaum	"Hypnotized" ft. Jada"	Songs People Together	Independent	Writer, Producer	2022
August Rosenbaum	"Shifting (Outro)"	Songs People Together	Independent	Writer, Producer	2022
GITAA	"Sweet Like Summer"	Single	Create Music Group	Writer, Producer	2021
Drake	"Lemon Pepper Freestyle ft. Rick Ross"	Scary Hours 2	Republic	Writer	2021
Yuna, Pink Sweat$	"Don't Blame It On Love"	Single	Yuna Room Records	Producer	2021
Olivia Dean	"Float"	Growth	EMI/Universal Music	Writer	2021
DRAMA	"Don't Hold Back"	Single	DRAMA MUSIC	Producer, Writer	2021
Emi Wes	"Take Me to the Moon"	Single	Universal Music (Denmark)	Producer, Writer	2021
Emi Wes	"Get That"	Single	Universal Music (Denmark)	Producer, Writer	2021
Delilah Montagu	"This Is Not a Love Song"	This Is Not a Love Song EP	Columbia Records	Producer, Writer	2021
Delilah Montagu	"Us	This Is Not a Love Song EP	Columbia Records	Producer, Writer	2021
Delilah Montagu	"Loud"	This Is Not a Love Song EP	Columbia Records	Producer, Writer	2021
Delilah Montagu	"Version of Me"	This Is Not a Love Song EP	Columbia Records	Producer, Writer	2021
Delilah Montagu	"Faultine"	This Is Not a Love Song EP	Columbia Records	Producer, Writer	2021
Delilah Montagu	"Pretend"	This Is Not a Love Song EP	Columbia Records	Producer, Writer	2021
Alina Baraz	"Memo Blue"	It Was Divine	Mom + Pop	Writer, Producer	2020
Alina Baraz	"Who Got Me"	It Was Divine	Mom + Pop	Writer, Producer	2020
Niia	"No Light (Intro)"	II: La Bella Vita	NIIAROCCO LLC	Writer, Producer	2020
Niia	"Whatever You Got"	II: La Bella Vita	NIIAROCCO LLC	Writer, Producer	2020
Niia	"Obsession"	II: La Bella Vita	NIIAROCCO LLC	Writer, Producer	2020
Niia	"Sad Boys"	II: La Bella Vita	NIIAROCCO LLC	Writer, Producer	2020
Niia	"Black Dress"	II: La Bella Vita	NIIAROCCO LLC	Writer, Producer	2020
Niia	"Coppola in Black"	II: La Bella Vita	NIIAROCCO LLC	Writer, Producer	2020
Niia	"Positano (Interlude)"	II: La Bella Vita	NIIAROCCO LLC	Writer, Producer	2020
Niia	"Face"	II: La Bella Vita	NIIAROCCO LLC	Writer, Producer	2020
Niia	"If I Cared"	II: La Bella Vita	NIIAROCCO LLC	Writer, Producer	2020
Niia	"La Bella Vita"	II: La Bella Vita	NIIAROCCO LLC	Writer, Producer	2020
Niia	"Like You Do"	II: La Bella Vita	NIIAROCCO LLC	Writer, Producer	2020
Niia	"If You Won't Marry Me Right Now"	II: La Bella Vita	NIIAROCCO LLC	Writer, Producer	2020
Niia	"Cup of Trouble"	II: La Bella Vita	NIIAROCCO LLC	Writer, Producer	2020
DVSN	"Dangerous City feat. Buju Banton & Ty Dolla $ign"	Single	OVO Sound/Warner Records	Writer, Producer	2020
Caroline Polachek	"Go As A Dream"	Pang	Columbia Records	Writer, Producer	2019
Flume	"Let Me Know" ft. London Grammar (Robin Hannibal Rework)	Single	Future Classics	Remixer	2019
Niia	"If I Cared"	Single	Atlantic	Writer, Producer	2019
Niia	"Face"	Single	Atlantic	Writer, Producer	2019
Niia	"Whatever U Want"	Single	Atlantic	Writer, Producer	2019
Max Jury	"Sweet Lie"	Modern World	Marathon Records	Writer, Producer	2019
Max Jury	"Modern World"	Modern World	Marathon Records	Writer, Producer	2019
Max Jury	"Gone"	Modern World	Marathon Records	Writer, Producer	2019
Max Jury	"Burning Through You"	Modern World	Marathon Records	Writer, Producer	2019
Max Jury	"L.A. Rain"	Modern World	Marathon Records	Writer, Producer	2019
Max Jury	"Crime"	Modern World	Marathon Records	Writer, Producer	2019
Max Jury	"Stillness"	Modern World	Marathon Records	Writer, Producer	2019
Max Jury	"Primrose Hill"	Modern World	Marathon Records	Writer, Producer	2019
Max Jury	"Quicksand"	Modern World	Marathon Records	Writer, Producer	2019
Max Jury	"Fading Out of You"	Modern World	Marathon Records	Writer, Producer	2019
Yuna	"Castaway" Ft. Tyler the Creator	Rouge	Verve Forecast, UMG	Writer, producer	2019
Yuna	"Blank Marquee"	Rouge	Verve Forecast, UMG	Writer, producer	2019
Yuna	"The Love of my Life"	Rouge	Verve Forecast, UMG	Writer, producer	2019
Yuna	"Pink Youth" ft. Little Simz	Rouge	Verve Forecast, UMG	Writer, producer	2019
Yuna	"Forget About You"	Rouge	Verve Forecast, UMG	Writer, producer	2019
Yuna	"Likes" ft. Kyle	Rouge	Verve Forecast, UMG	Writer, producer	2019
Yuna	"Does She"	Rouge	Verve Forecast, UMG	Writer, producer	2019
Yuna	"Forevermore"	Rouge	Verve Forecast, UMG	Writer, producer	2019
Yuna	"Tiada Akhir"	Rouge	Verve Forecast, UMG	Writer, producer	2019
Yore	"Knew Better"	EP1	Indie-Pop	Writer, Producer	2018
Yore	"Angel Eyes"	EP1	Indie-Pop	Writer, Producer	2018
Yore	"New Religion"	EP1	Indie-Pop	Writer, Producer	2018
Jacob Banks	"Unknown"	Village	Interscope	Producer	2018
Miya Folick	"Stop Talking"	Premonition	Interscope	Writer, Producer	2018
DNCE	"TV In The Morning"	People to People EP	Republic Records	Writer, Producer	2018
DNCE	"Still Good"	People to People EP	Republic Records	Producer	2018
Niia	"Constantly Dissatisfied" ft. Gallant	I	Atlantic	Writer, Producer	2018
Alina Baraz	"High"	The Color of You	Mom+Pop	Writer, Producer	2018
August Rosenbaum	"Angelo" solo (solo piano)	Rasa	Tambourhinoceros	Writer, Producer	2018
August Rosenbaum	"Belmondo" (solo piano)	Rasa	Tambourhinoceros	Writer, Producer	2018
August Rosenbaum	"Nomad" (solo piano)	Rasa	Tambourhinoceros	Writer, Producer	2018
August Rosenbaum	"Calling Out" (solo piano)	Rasa	Tambourhinoceros	Writer, Producer	2018
August Rosenbaum	"Melville" (solo piano)	Rasa	Tambourhinoceros	Writer, Producer	2018
August Rosenbaum	"Milo" (solo piano)	Rasa	Tambourhinoceros	Writer, Producer	2018
Niia	"California" Ft. Boogie	I	Atlantic	Writer, Producer	2018
Ab-Soul, Anderson Paak and James Blake	"Bloody Waters"	Black Panther	Interscope; Top Dawg; Aftermath	Co-Writer, Co-Producer	2018
Kimbra	"Human"	Primal Heart	Warner Bros	Writer, Musician	2018
August Rosenbaum	"Angelo"	Vista	Tambourhinoceros	Producer, Writer, Arranger	2017
August Rosenbaum	"Belmondo"	Vista	Tambourhinoceros	Producer, Writer, Arranger	2017
August Rosenbaum	"Nomad"	Vista	Tambourhinoceros	Producer, Writer, Arranger	2017
August Rosenbaum	"Nebula"	Vista	Tambourhinoceros	Producer, Writer, Arranger	2017
August Rosenbaum	"Killer"	Vista	Tambourhinoceros	Producer, Writer, Arranger	2017
August Rosenbaum	"Calling Out"	Vista	Tambourhinoceros	Producer, Writer, Arranger	2017
August Rosenbaum	Skin	Vista	Tambourhinoceros	Producer, Writer, Arranger	2017
August Rosenbaum	"Tristana"	Vista	Tambourhinoceros	Producer, Writer, Arranger	2017
August Rosenbaum	"Emo"	Vista	Tambourhinoceros	Producer, Writer, Arranger	2017
August Rosenbaum	"Credo"	Vista	Tambourhinoceros	Producer, Writer, Arranger	2017
August Rosenbaum	"Wu"	Vista	Tambourhinoceros	Producer, Writer, Arranger	2017
August Rosenbaum	"Melville"	Vista	Tambourhinoceros	Producer, Writer, Arranger	2017
August Rosenbaum	"Victim"	Vista	Tambourhinoceros	Producer, Writer, Arranger	2017
August Rosenbaum	"Credo Pt. II" feat. Coco O.	Vista	Tambourhinoceros	Producer, Writer, Arranger	2017
Dvsn	"Morning After"	Morning After	OVO	Producer, Writer, Arranger	2017
Niia	"Nobody" feat. Goldlink	I	Atlantic	Production, Writer	2017
Jacob Banks	"Unknown"	Paradox	Full + Blessed/Renowned Records	Production, Arrangement	2017
Jacob Banks	"Unknown" Timbaland Remix	Paradox	Full + Blessed/Renowned Records	Production, Arrangement	2017
Calvin Harris	"Heatstroke" (feat. Young Thug, Ariana Grande and Pharrell Williams)	Funk Wav Bounces Vol. 1	Sony	Writer	2017
Kacy Hill	"Am I"	Like A Woman	Def Jam	Producer, Writer, Arranger	2017
Johan Lenox	"High In The Woods" feat. Vic Mensa	High In The Woods (single)	Self Release	Producer	2017
The Late Great Fitzcarraldos	"Never Know"	You	Gold Records	Writer	2017
Niia	"Prelude"	I	Atlantic Records	Producer, Writer, Arranger	2017
Niia	"Hurt You First"	I	Atlantic Records	Producer, Writer, Arranger	2017
Niia	"Sideline"	I	Atlantic Records	Producer, Writer, Arranger	2017
Niia	"Nobody"	I	Atlantic Records	Producer, Writer, Arranger	2017
Niia	"Last Night In Los Feliz"	I	Atlantic Records	Producer, Writer, Arranger	2017
Niia	"Girl Like Me"	I	Atlantic Records	Producer, Writer, Arranger	2017
Niia	"Day & Night"	I	Atlantic Records	Producer, Writer, Arranger	2017
Niia	"Constantly Dissatisfied"	I	Atlantic Records	Producer, Writer, Arranger	2017
Niia	"California"	I	Atlantic Records	Producer, Writer, Arranger	2017
Niia	"All I Need"	I	Atlantic Records	Producer, Writer, Arranger	2017
Niia	"Mulholland"	I	Atlantic Records	Producer, Writer, Arranger	2017
Niia	"Sideline feat. Jazmine Sullivan"	I	Atlantic Records	Producer, Writer, Arranger	2017
NYLO	"Blame It On My X"	Blame It On My X (Single)	Indie-Pop	Producer	2016
Johan Lenox	"High In The Woods"	High In The Woods (Single)	Self Release	Producer	2016
Ry X	"Howling"	Remix	Liberator Music	Producer, Arranger	2016
Saro	"Test"	In Loving Memory EP	Mateo Sound	Producer, Writer, Arranger	2016
Saro	"Rampart"	In Loving Memory EP	Mateo Sound	Producer, Writer, Arranger	2016
Niia	"Bored To Death"	Bored To Death (Single)	Atlantic	Writer, Producer	2016
Hundred Waters	Show Me Love (ft. Chance the Rapper, Moses Sumney & Robin Hannibal)	Skrillex Remix	OWSLA	Writer, Producer, Arranger	2016
Yuna	Lanes	Chapters	Verve Music	Producer	2016
Yuna	Best Love	Chapters	Verve Music	Producer	2016
Yuna	Too Close	Chapters	Verve Music	Producer	2016
Yuna	Best of Me	Chapters	Verve Music	Producer	2016
Chairlift	"Moth to the Flame"	Moth	Columbia	Producer	2016
Chairlift	"Show U Off"	Moth	Columbia	Producer	2016
Chairlift	"Ch-Ching"	Moth	Columbia	Producer	2016
Wet	"All The Ways"	Don't You	Columbia	Producer	2016
Lion Babe	"Where Do We Go" - Single	Begin	Interscope	Producer	2016
Cee Lo Green	"Smells Like Fire"	Heart Blanche	Atlantic	Arranger	2015
Jamie Woon	"Sharpness" - Single	Making Time	Polydor	Producer, Writer	2015
Jamie Woon	"Little Wonder"	Making Time	Polydor	Producer, Writer	2015
Jamie Woon	"Forgiven"	Making Time	Polydor	Producer	2015
Erik Hassle	"No Words" - Single	No Words	RCA	Producer, Writer	2015
August Alsina	"Hollywood"	This Thing Called Life	Def Jam	Producer, Writer	2015
Selah Sue	"Alone"	Reason	Because Music	Producer, Writer, Arranger	2015
Selah Sue	"Alive"	Reason	Because Music	Producer, Writer, Arranger	2015
Selah Sue	"Reason"	Reason	Because Music	Producer, Writer, Arranger	2015
Selah Sue	"Daddy"	Reason	Because Music	Producer, Writer, Arranger	2015
Francesco Yates	"When I Found You"	Francesco Yates EP	Atlantic	Producer, Writer	2015
Francesco Yates	"Better To Be Loved"	Francesco Yates EP	Atlantic	Producer, Writer	2015
Francesco Yates	"Honey I'm Home"	Francesco Yates EP	Atlantic	Producer, Writer	2015
Francesco Yates	"Call"	Francesco Yates EP	Atlantic	Producer, Writer	2015
Laura Welsh	"Cold Front"	Soft Control	Polydor	Producer, Writer, Arranger	2015
Laura Welsh	"Hardest Part"	Soft Control	Polydor	Producer, Writer, Arranger	2015
Laura Welsh	"Soft Control"	Soft Control	Polydor	Producer, Writer, Arranger	2015
Laura Welsh	"Still Life"	Soft Control	Polydor	Producer, Writer, Arranger	2015
Laura Welsh	"Breathe Me In"	Soft Control	Polydor	Producer, Writer, Arranger	2015
Niia	"Body"	Generation Blue EP	Something Local	Producer, Writer, Arranger	2014
Niia	"Numb"	Generation Blue EP	Something Local	Producer, Writer, Arranger	2014
Niia	"Seeing Red"	Generation Blue EP	Something Local	Producer, Writer, Arranger	2014
Niia	"Generation Blue"	Generation Blue EP	Something Local	Producer, Writer, Arranger	2014
Niia	"Telephone"	Generation Blue EP	Something Local	Producer, Writer, Arranger	2014
Niia	"Breaking"	Generation Blue EP	Something Local	Producer, Writer, Arranger	2014
Doja Cat	"Beautiful"	Purrr!	Self Release	Writer	2014
Yuna	"Lights and Camera" (feat. G Eazy)	Single	Verve Music Group	Producer, Writer	2014
Jessie Ware	"12"	B-Side	Island	Producer, Writer, Mixer	2014
Kan Wakan	"Moving On" (Robin Hannibal Remix)	Moving On	The Verve Music Group	Remixer	2014
Little Dragon	"Killing Me"	Nabuma Rubberband	Loma Vista / Republic	Producer, Writer	2013
Little Dragon	"Let Go"	Nabuma Rubberband	Loma Vista / Republic	Producer, Writer	2013
Rhye	"Open"	Woman	Polydor / Universal Republic	Producer, Writer, Band Member	2013
Rhye	"The Fall"	Woman	Polydor / Universal Republic	Producer, Writer, Band Member	2013
Rhye	"Last Dance"	Woman	Polydor / Universal Republic	Producer, Writer, Band Member	2013
Rhye	"Verse"	Woman	Polydor / Universal Republic	Producer, Writer, Band Member	2013
Rhye	"Shed Some Blood"	Woman	Polydor / Universal Republic	Producer, Writer, Band Member	2013
Rhye	"3 Days"	Woman	Polydor / Universal Republic	Producer, Writer, Band Member	2013
Rhye	"One Of Those Summer Days"	Woman	Polydor / Universal Republic	Producer, Writer, Band Member	2013
Rhye	"Major Minor Love"	Woman	Polydor / Universal Republic	Producer, Writer, Band Member	2013
Rhye	"Hunger"	Woman	Polydor / Universal Republic	Producer, Writer, Band Member	2013
Rhye	"Woman"	Woman	Polydor / Universal Republic	Producer, Writer, Band Member	2013
Quadron	LFT	Avalanche	Vested in Culture / Epic	Producer, Writer, Arranger, Band Member	2013
Quadron	"Favorite Star"	Avalanche	Vested in Culture / Epic	Producer, Writer, Arranger, Band Member	2013
Quadron	"Hey Love"	Avalanche	Vested in Culture / Epic	Producer, Writer, Arranger, Band Member	2013
Quadron	"Crush"	Avalanche	Vested in Culture / Epic	Producer, Writer, Arranger, Band Member	2013
Quadron	"Befriend"	Avalanche	Vested in Culture / Epic	Producer, Writer, Arranger, Band Member	2013
Quadron	"Neverland"	Avalanche	Vested in Culture / Epic	Producer, Writer, Arranger, Band Member	2013
Quadron	"It's Gonna Get You"	Avalanche	Vested in Culture / Epic	Producer, Writer, Arranger, Band Member	2013
Quadron	"Better Off" (feat. Kendrick Lamar)	Avalanche	Vested in Culture / Epic	Producer, Writer, Arranger, Band Member	2013
Quadron	"Sea Salt"	Avalanche	Vested in Culture / Epic	Producer, Writer, Arranger, Band Member	2013
Quadron	"Avalanche"	Avalanche	Vested in Culture / Epic	Producer, Writer, Arranger, Band Member	2013
B.o.B.	"Wide Open" (feat. Ester Dean)	Underground Luxury	Atlantic	Writer	2013
Yuna	"Falling"	Nocturnal	Verve	Producer, Writer	2013
Yuna	"Lights and Camera"	Nocturnal	Verve	Producer, Writer	2013
Niia	"Made for You" - Single	Made For You	Independent	Producer, Writer, Arranger	2013
Laura Mvula	"She" (Robin Hannibal Rework)	She Remixes - EP	RCA	Remixer	2013
Wild Belle	"Another Girl"	Isles	Columbia	Remixer	2013
Coco O. of Quadron	"Where The Wind Blows"	The Great Gatsby OST	Interscope	Producer	2013
Bobby	"More Than Just A Friend" - Single	More Than Just A Friend	Quieres Chicle?	Producer, Writer, Arranger, Solo Artist	2013
Bobby	"Tame The Shrew" - Single	Tame The Shrew	Quieres Chicle?	Producer, Writer, Arranger, Solo Artist	2013
Kendrick Lamar	"Bitch, Don't Kill My Vibe"	Good Kid, M.A.A.D. City	Interscope	Writer	2012
The Internet	"Lonely Notes"	Purple Naked Ladies EP	Odd Future Records	Producer, Writer	2012
Orfeo	"No Substitution"	Orfeo EP	Quieres Chicle?	Producer, Writer	2012
Orfeo	"Quiet Nights"	Orfeo EP	Quieres Chicle?	Producer, Writer	2012
Leon Ware	"Orchids For The Sun" (feat. Quadron)	Orchids For The Sun/Hold Tight - EP	Quieres Chicle?	Producer, Writer	2012
Leon Ware	"Hold Tight"	Orchids For The Sun/Hold Tight - EP	Quieres Chicle?	Producer, Writer	2012
Quadron	"Baby be Mine"	Think Like A Man OST	Epic	Producer, Band Member	2012
Hotel Noir	Original Motions Picture Soundtrack	Hotel Noir OST	Independent	Producer, Composer	2012
Szjerdene	"Lead The Way"	Szjerdene - Single	Independent Release	Producer, Writer	2011
Szjerdene	"If 6 Was 8"	Szjerdene - Single	Independent Release	Producer, Writer	2011
Kris Mars	"Lose Your Mind"	Traveler EP	Independent Release	Producer, Writer	2011
Kris Mars	"The Painter"	Traveler EP	Independent Release	Producer, Writer	2011
Kris Mars	"The Sky Is Red"	Traveler EP	Independent Release	Producer, Writer	2011
Kris Mars	"Night Life"	Traveler EP	Independent Release	Producer, Writer	2011
Kris Mars	"Meant To Be"	Traveler EP	Independent Release	Producer, Writer	2011
Quadron	"Samba De Verão"	Red Hot + Rio 2	eOne	Producer, Band Member	2011
Parallel Dance Ensemble	Shopping Cart	Possessions and Obsessions	Permanent Vacation	Producer, Writer, Arranger, Band Member	2011
Parallel Dance Ensemble	"Conditions"	Possessions and Obsessions	Permanent Vacation	Producer, Writer, Arranger, Band Member	2011
Parallel Dance Ensemble	"Juices"	Possessions and Obsessions	Permanent Vacation	Producer, Writer, Arranger, Band Member	2011
Parallel Dance Ensemble	"Possessions"	Possessions and Obsessions	Permanent Vacation	Producer, Writer, Arranger, Band Member	2011
Parallel Dance Ensemble	"Graffiti Girls"	Possessions and Obsessions	Permanent Vacation	Producer, Writer, Arranger, Band Member	2011
Parallel Dance Ensemble	"Run"	Possessions and Obsessions	Permanent Vacation	Producer, Writer, Arranger, Band Member	2011
Parallel Dance Ensemble	"Wildchild"	Possessions and Obsessions	Permanent Vacation	Producer, Writer, Arranger, Band Member	2011
Parallel Dance Ensemble	"Occupied"	Possessions and Obsessions	Permanent Vacation	Producer, Writer, Arranger, Band Member	2011
Parallel Dance Ensemble	"Time"	Possessions and Obsessions	Permanent Vacation	Producer, Writer, Arranger, Band Member	2011
Boom Clap Bachelors	"Skynd Dig Langsomt"	Mellem Dine Læber EP	Plug Research	Producer, Writer, Arranger, Band Member	2011
Boom Clap Bachelors	"Løb Stop Stå"	Mellem Dine Læber EP	Plug Research	Producer, Writer, Arranger, Band Member	2011
Boom Clap Bachelors	"Andres Hænder"	Mellem Dine Læber EP	Plug Research	Producer, Writer, Arranger, Band Member	2011
Boom Clap Bachelors	"Hjerteslag"	Mellem Dine Læber EP	Plug Research	Producer, Writer, Arranger, Band Member	2011
Quadron	Buster Keaton	Quadron	A-larm / Universal	Producer, Writer, Arranger, Band Member	2010
Quadron	"Slippin'"	Quadron	A-larm / Universal	Producer, Writer, Arranger, Band Member	2010
Quadron	"Day"	Quadron	A-larm / Universal	Producer, Writer, Arranger, Band Member	2010
Quadron	"Jeans"	Quadron	A-larm / Universal	Producer, Writer, Arranger, Band Member	2010
Quadron	"Pressure"	Quadron	A-larm / Universal	Producer, Writer, Arranger, Band Member	2010
Quadron	"Horse"	Quadron	A-larm / Universal	Producer, Writer, Arranger, Band Member	2010
Quadron	"Average Fruit"	Quadron	A-larm / Universal	Producer, Writer, Arranger, Band Member	2010
Quadron	"Unpatience"	Quadron	A-larm / Universal	Producer, Writer, Arranger, Band Member	2010
Quadron	"Far Cry"	Quadron	A-larm / Universal	Producer, Writer, Arranger, Band Member	2010
Quadron	"Tone"	Quadron	A-larm / Universal	Producer, Writer, Arranger, Band Member	2010
Quadron	"Simili Life"	Quadron	A-larm / Universal	Producer, Writer, Arranger, Band Member	2010
Quadron	"Herfra HVor Vi Står"	Quadron	A-larm / Universal	Producer, Writer, Arranger, Band Member	2010
Bobby	"Move"	Bobby EP	Plug Research	Producer, Writer, Arranger, Solo Artist	2010
Bobby	"Plastic"	Bobby EP	Plug Research	Producer, Writer, Arranger, Solo Artist	2010
Bobby	"Amends"	Bobby EP	Plug Research	Producer, Writer, Arranger, Solo Artist	2010
Bobby	"Voltaire"	Bobby EP	Plug Research	Producer, Writer, Arranger, Solo Artist	2010
Bobby	"Transit"	Bobby EP	Plug Research	Producer, Writer, Arranger, Solo Artist	2010
Bobby	"Pain"	Bobby EP	Plug Research	Producer, Writer, Arranger, Solo Artist	2010
Julian Gomes	"I Need Your Love"	Various Assets	Red Bull Music Academy	Production, Writer, Band Member	2010
Marco Passarani & Julian Gomes	"Walking Down Tooley Street"	Various Assets	Red Bull Music Academy	Arranger	2010
Hudson Mohawke & Myele Manzanza	"Ain't Nobody Like You"	Various Assets	Red Bull Music Academy	Producer, Writer, Band member	2010
Ross McHenry, Biel Nascimbeni, Myele Manzanza, Jakob Schneidewind, Katy B, Infestus	"The Song"	Various Assets	Red Bull Music Academy	Producer	2010
Master Mp6-60	"Rocking All Night"	Various Assets	Red Bull Music Academy	Producer, Writer, Band Member	2010
B. Bravo	"What's It Gonna Be"	Various Assets	Red Bull Music Academy	Producer, Writer, Band Member	2010
Cornelia, Om'Mas Keith	"I'm So Over You"	Various Assets	Red Bull Music Academy	Production, Writer, Band Member	2009
Coco Solid	"Turtle Pizza Cadillacs"	Various Assets	Red Bull Music Academy	Producer, Writer, Band Member	2009
Siesta & Zinc	"Long Night"	Various Assets	Red Bull Music Academy	Producer	2009
Leyo	"Barcelona Boogie"	Various Assets	Red Bull Music Academy	Producer	2009
Dimitri Ustinov, Cornelia, & Om'Mas Keith	"Get Your Laces Tight"	Various Assets	Red Bull Music Academy	Producer	2009
Jamie Woon & Subeena	"Solidify"	Various Assets	Red Bull Music Academy	Writer	2009
Hunee	Brother	Brother/Babel EP	Internasjonal	Producer	2009
Parallel Dance Ensemble	"Pizza Turtle Cadillac"	Pizza Turtle Cadillac EP	ISM Records	Producer, Writer, Arranger, Band Member	2009
Parallel Dance Ensemble	"Weight Watchers"	Pizza Turtle Cadillac EP	ISM Records	Producer, Writer, Arranger, Band Member	2009
Parallel Dance Ensemble	"Gigolette"	Pizza Turtle Cadillac EP	ISM Records	Producer, Writer, Arranger, Band Member	2009
Parallel Dance Ensemble	"Pizza Turtle Cadillac (Yam Who? Rework)"	Pizza Turtle Cadillac EP	ISM Records	Producer, Writer, Arranger, Band Member	2009
Parallel Dance Ensemble	"Weight Watchers (Yam Who? Rework"	Pizza Turtle Cadillac EP	ISM Records	Producer, Writer, Arranger, Band Member	2009
Quadron	Come You Can Go	Circulation and Jay Scarlett Present New Worlds	Circulations	Producer, Writer, Arranger, Band Member	2008
Boom Clap Bachelors	"Kom, La Os Gå"	Kort Før Dine Læber	Music For Dreams	Producer, Writer, Arranger, Band Member	2008
Boom Clap Bachelors	"Combiner"	Kort Før Dine Læber	Music For Dreams	Producer, Writer, Arranger, Band Member	2008
Boom Clap Bachelors	"Hvor Vi Henne"	Kort Før Dine Læber	Music For Dreams	Producer, Writer, Arranger, Band Member	2008
Boom Clap Bachelors	"Forår Til Dec"	Kort Før Dine Læber	Music For Dreams	Producer, Writer, Arranger, Band Member	2008
Boom Clap Bachelors	"Ring Til Mig"	Kort Før Dine Læber	Music For Dreams	Producer, Writer, Arranger, Band Member	2008
Boom Clap Bachelors	"Vuggevise"	Kort Før Dine Læber	Music For Dreams	Producer, Writer, Arranger, Band Member	2008
Boom Clap Bachelors	"Lide Dig"	Kort Før Dine Læber	Music For Dreams	Producer, Writer, Arranger, Band Member	2008
Boom Clap Bachelors	"Kommer Aldrig"	Kort Før Dine Læber	Music For Dreams	Producer, Writer, Arranger, Band Member	2008
Boom Clap Bachelors	"Tiden Flyver"	Kort Før Dine Læber	Music For Dreams	Producer, Writer, Arranger, Band Member	2008
Non+	"Wake"	Sound Of Chance	EMI	Producer, Writer, Arranger, Band Member	2008
Non+	"Selling Sand"	Sound Of Chance	EMI	Producer, Writer, Arranger, Band Member	2008
Non+	"2020 Vision"	Sound Of Chance	EMI	Producer, Writer, Arranger, Band Member	2008
Non+	"Dorthea"	Sound Of Chance	EMI	Producer, Writer, Arranger, Band Member	2008
Non+	"People From Venice"	Sound Of Chance	EMI	Producer, Writer, Arranger, Band Member	2008
Non+	"Short Story"	Sound Of Chance	EMI	Producer, Writer, Arranger, Band Member	2008
Non+	"Tommy & Annika"	Sound Of Chance	EMI	Producer, Writer, Arranger, Band Member	2008
Non+	"Story Of Us"	Sound Of Chance	EMI	Producer, Writer, Arranger, Band Member	2008
Non+	"1 Touch"	Sound Of Chance	EMI	Producer, Writer, Arranger, Band Member	2008
Non+	"Living Loud"	Sound Of Chance	EMI	Producer, Writer, Arranger, Band Member	2008
Non+	"Song 36"	Sound Of Chance	EMI	Producer, Writer, Arranger, Band Member	2008
Non+	"Go!!!"	Sound Of Chance	EMI	Producer, Writer, Arranger, Band Member	2008
Non+	"World Is Full Of Names"	Sound Of Chance	EMI	Producer, Writer, Arranger, Band Member	2008
Non+	"12Teen"	Sound Of Chance	EMI	Producer, Writer, Arranger, Band Member	2008
Non+	"Asyl/Ennio Goes Surfing"	Sound Of Chance	EMI	Producer, Writer, Arranger, Band Member	2008
Owusu and Hannibal	"Intro"	Living With Owusu & Hannibal	Ubiquity	Producer, Writer, Arranger, Band Member	2006
Owusu and Hannibal	"Blue Jay"	Living With Owusu & Hannibal	Ubiquity	Producer, Writer, Arranger, Band Member	2006
Owusu and Hannibal	"Le Fox"	Living With Owusu & Hannibal	Ubiquity	Producer, Writer, Arranger, Band Member	2006
Owusu and Hannibal	"A Million Babies"	Living With Owusu & Hannibal	Ubiquity	Producer, Writer, Arranger, Band Member	2006
Owusu and Hannibal	"Means Nothing"	Living With Owusu & Hannibal	Ubiquity	Producer, Writer, Arranger, Band Member	2006
Owusu and Hannibal	"Delirium"	Living With Owusu & Hannibal	Ubiquity	Producer, Writer, Arranger, Band Member	2006
Owusu and Hannibal	"Lonnie's Secret"	Living With Owusu & Hannibal	Ubiquity	Producer, Writer, Arranger, Band Member	2006
Owusu and Hannibal	"What It's About"	Living With Owusu & Hannibal	Ubiquity	Producer, Writer, Arranger, Band Member	2006
Owusu and Hannibal	"Monster"	Living With Owusu & Hannibal	Ubiquity	Producer, Writer, Arranger, Band Member	2006
Owusu and Hannibal	"Watch"	Living With Owusu & Hannibal	Ubiquity	Producer, Writer, Arranger, Band Member	2006
Owusu and Hannibal	"Upstairs Downstairs"	Living With Owusu & Hannibal	Ubiquity	Producer, Writer, Arranger, Band Member	2006
Owusu and Hannibal	"Caroline, No"	Living With Owusu & Hannibal	Ubiquity	Producer, Writer, Arranger, Band Member	2006
Owusu and Hannibal	"Elephants"	Living With Owusu & Hannibal	Ubiquity	Producer, Writer, Arranger, Band Member	2006
Owusu and Hannibal	"Another Mile"	Living With Owusu & Hannibal	Ubiquity	Producer, Writer, Arranger, Band Member	2006
Owusu and Hannibal	"Outro"	Living With Owusu & Hannibal	Ubiquity	Producer, Writer, Arranger, Band Member	2006
Boom Clap Bachelors	"Time"	Boom Clap Bachelors	Boom Clap Bachelors	Producer, Writer, Arranger, Band Member	2005
Boom Clap Bachelors	"Girl"	Boom Clap Bachelors	Boom Clap Bachelors	Producer, Writer, Arranger, Band Member	2005
Boom Clap Bachelors	"Dreamanist"	Boom Clap Bachelors	Boom Clap Bachelors	Producer, Writer, Arranger, Band Member	2005
Boom Clap Bachelors	"one Minute We're"	Boom Clap Bachelors	Boom Clap Bachelors	Producer, Writer, Arranger, Band Member	2005
Boom Clap Bachelors	"When Sly Calls"	Boom Clap Bachelors	Boom Clap Bachelors	Producer, Writer, Arranger, Band Member	2005
Nobody Beats The Beats	"Moonlight"	Drops From Above	Sonny B Recordings	Producer, Writer	2004
Nobody Beats The Beats	"Well Done" (Interlude)	The Second Coming	Sonny B Recordings	Producer, Writer	2003
Nobody Beats The Beats	"Kalifo's Groove"	The Second Coming	Sonny B Recordings	Producer, Writer	2003

== Awards and nominations ==
Danish Music Awards

- 2013 - Best Urban Act, Quadron
- 2013 - Best New Act, Quadron
- 2013 - Best Producer, Robin Hannibal

Danish Critics Choice Awards

- 2013 - Best Hit, "Hey Love" - Quadron
- 2013 - Best Producer, Robin Hannibal

Nordic Music Prize

- 2013 - Best Album, Rhye (nominated)

Polaris Music Prize

- 2013 - Best Album, Rhye (nominated)

Danish Electronic Awards

- Lifetime Achievement Award, Robin Hannibal

Danish National Radio P3 Awards

- Best New Act, Quadron
