= Quadron =

Danish musical duo

- Origin: Copenhagen, Denmark
- Genres: Indie pop; electronica; neo soul; jazz rap; PBR&B
- Years active: 2009–2014
- Members: Coco O.; Robin Hannibal

Quadron is a Los Angeles–based Danish duo consisting of singer Coco O. and musician/producer Robin Hannibal. The group considers their genre "electronic soul music".

The self-titled debut album Quadron was released in late July 2009. Paste Magazine named Quadron "Best of What's Next" in August 2010, and New York Magazine named Quadron's self-titled album number 7 in their top 10 best albums of the year. The duo released their second studio album Avalanche in 2013.

== History ==
In 2009, Hannibal and Coco O. of electronica collective Boom Clap Bachelors formed the group Quadron. The name of the band refers to the multi-racial heritage of the band members (from the term "quadroon"). Both Hannibal and Coco O. have one biracial parent.

Quadron's first professional project, released 2009, was a collection of seven songs on the soundtrack for the Hella Joof movie, Hush Little Baby including the film's theme song "Slippin'". Their music gained wider prominence in the United States due to Hannibal's connections to US-based music industry professionals. They re-located to Los Angeles in 2010.

The duo released their eponymous debut album under Plug Research in 2010. Their second album, Avalanche, was released in June 2013.

In 2011, Quadron contributed the track "Samba De Verão" to the Red Hot Organizations charitable album Red Hot+Rio 2. The album is a follow-up to the 1996 Red Hot + Rio. Proceeds from the sales were donated to raise awareness and money to fight HIV/AIDS and related health and social issues. That year they also collaborated with American DJ and record producer Kaskade for the song "Waste Love" off his album Fire & Ice.

In 2014 Quadron was booked as the opening act on Mayer Hawthorne's U.S. tour.

== Band members ==
- Robin Hannibal is one-half of the duo Rhye, along with Canadian musician Michael Milosh. After releasing two tracks, they released their first album Woman on 4 March 2013.

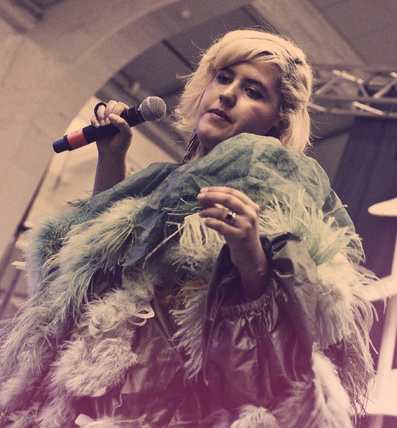
Coco O. in 2010

- Cecilie Maja Hastrup Karshø (known professionally as "Coco O.") was a member of the Boom Clap Bachelors prior to joining Quadron. She has contributed vocals to films such as Baz Luhrmann's adaptation of F. Scott Fitzgerald's The Great Gatsby, produced by Jay-Z. She has also been a featured vocalist for French DJ/producer Cedric Gervais's 2014 single "Through the Night", the track "Business Casual" on the album Mr. Finish Line by Vulfpeck released in 2017, and the track "Don't Want It to Be Over" on the 2018 album Inside Voice by Joey Dosik.

== Discography ==
=== Albums ===
Title	Album details	Peak chart positions		Certifications
Title	Album details	DEN	US	Certifications
Quadron	Released: 27 July 2009; Label: Alarm; Formats: CD, digital download	31	—	
Avalanche	Released: 31 May 2013; Label: Vested in Culture, Epic; Formats: LP, CD, digital download	3	115	IFPI DEN: Gold
"—" denotes items which were not released in that country or failed to chart.

=== Singles ===
Year	Title	Peak chart positions		Certifications	Album
Year	Title	DENDownload	DENAirplay	Certifications	Album
2009	"Slippin'"	—	—		Quadron
2009	"Pressure"	—	—		Quadron
2010	"Buster Keaton"	—	—		Quadron
2013	"Hey Love"	8	—	IFPI DEN: Gold	Avalanche
2013	"Favorite Star"	—	—		Avalanche
2013	"LFT"	—	16		Avalanche
"—" denotes items which were not released in that country or failed to chart.
