= Beyoncé (album) =

2013 studio album by Beyoncé

- Standard edition cover

Studio album by Beyoncé
- Released: December 13, 2013
- Recorded: c. 2012–2013
- Studios: Fetalmaus; Jungle City; Oven (New York City); Kings Landing (The Hamptons, New York); Mirrorball; Westlake (West Hollywood, California); Russell's of Clapton (London); Tritonus (Berlin); Trackdown (Sydney)
- Genre: Electro-R&B
- Length: 66:35
- Labels: Parkwood; Columbia
- Directors: Beyoncé; Jonas Åkerlund; Ed Burke; Francesco Carrozzini; Pierre Debusschere; Bill Kirstein; @lilinternet; Melina Matsoukas; Jake Nava; Terry Richardson; Ricky Saiz; Todd Tourso; Hype Williams
- Producers: 40; Ammo; Andre Eric Proctor; Beyoncé; Bobby Johnson; Boots; Brian Soko; Caroline Polachek; Detail; Greg Kurstin; HazeBanga; Hit-Boy; Jerome Harmon; Justin Timberlake; Key Wane; Mike Caren; Pharrell Williams; Rasool Diaz; Rey Reel Music; Ryan Tedder; The-Dream; Timbaland

Beyoncé chronology
4: The Remix (2012)	Beyoncé (2013)	Lemonade (2016)

Singles from Beyoncé
- 1. "Blow" Released: December 13, 2013 (Note: "Blow" was released only in Italy, while its planned US release was canceled in favor of "XO".); 2. "XO" / "Drunk in Love" Released: December 16, 2013; 3. "Partition" Released: February 25, 2014; 4. "Pretty Hurts" Released: June 10, 2014

Singles from Beyoncé: Platinum Edition
- 1. "Flawless (Remix)" Released: August 12, 2014; 2. "7/11" Released: November 25, 2014; 3. "Ring Off" Released: November 28, 2014

Beyoncé is the fifth studio album by the American singer and songwriter Beyoncé. A visual album, it was surprise-released on December 13, 2013, through Parkwood Entertainment and Columbia Records. The songs and videos were recorded in secrecy for the unexpected release.

Beyoncé initially worked with various producers and songwriters, inviting them to live in her mansion for a month in mid-2012. After a disruption caused by touring, Beyoncé resumed work in early 2013 and experimented with styles outside contemporary R&B. The result is an electro-R&B record with elements of alternative R&B, electronic, and soul. Its textured, ambient soundscape is characterized by heavy bass, percussion, and synthesizers. Beyoncé's desire to assert full artistic autonomy influenced the album's dark, personal lyrics, which address sexuality and monogamy from a feminist perspective.

Upon release, Beyoncé broke the record for the fastest-selling album in the history of the iTunes Store. It debuted at number one on the US Billboard 200 and has been certified six-times platinum by the Recording Industry Association of America. The album also reached number one in Australia, Canada, Croatia, the Netherlands, and Poland. Five songs were released as singles: "Blow", "XO", "Drunk in Love", "Partition", and "Pretty Hurts"; "Drunk in Love" reached number two on the US Billboard Hot 100. The album was reissued as the Platinum Edition on November 24, 2014, and was supported by the Mrs. Carter Show World Tour and the Jay-Z co-headlining On the Run Tour.

Beyoncé received universal critical acclaim for its experimental production, Beyoncé's vocals, and its exploration of sexuality; various critics consider it her magnum opus. At the 57th Annual Grammy Awards in 2015, it won Best Surround Sound Album, and "Drunk in Love" won Best R&B Song and Best R&B Performance. Often considered one of the greatest albums of all time, Beyoncé has been credited with popularizing the contemporary visual album, and its surprise release prompted the International Federation of the Phonographic Industry to change Global Release Day from Tuesday to Friday.

== Background and development ==
Following the release of her fourth studio album, 4 (2011), Beyoncé gave birth to her first child, Blue Ivy, on January 7, 2012, and held a concert residency, Revel Presents: Beyoncé Live, four months after labor. Beyoncé performed soon after giving birth to show mothers that they need not pause their careers after having children. After the residency, she spent mid-2012 in the Hamptons, New York, where she stepped away from the public eye to spend time with her daughter and begin working on her next album. She resumed work in early 2013, performing "The Star-Spangled Banner" at President Barack Obama's second inauguration and headlining the Super Bowl XLVII halftime show. She also released a self-directed autobiographical documentary in February, entitled Life Is But a Dream.

"Bow Down / I Been On"
Critics opined that the abrasive hip-hop production of "Bow Down / I Been On" presented a new aspect to Beyoncé's music. The first part, "Bow Down", was incorporated into the track "Flawless" of Beyoncé.

In March 2013, Beyoncé released a two-part hip-hop track titled "Bow Down/I Been On" on SoundCloud. "Bow Down", produced by Hit-Boy, was written after Beyoncé woke up one morning with a chant stuck in her head, feeling angry and defensive. The Timbaland-produced "I Been On" is built on a chopped and screwed vocal as an homage to the Houston hip-hop scene of Beyoncé's hometown. Michael Cragg of The Guardian described the song as "brilliantly odd", commending its loud, abrasive production, while Pitchfork's Lindsay Zoladz noted the song's assertiveness and believed it served as an introduction of what was to come. "Bow Down/I Been On" was perceived as a significant departure from Beyoncé's existing catalog, particularly for its aggressive nature. The song's atmosphere and its controversial "Bow down, bitches" refrain drew a mixed reaction from those who questioned whether the lyric was aimed at women or merely a moment of braggadocio. Beyoncé clarified after the album's release, where elements of "Bow Down" appear on the track "Flawless", that the song and its refrain were intended as a statement of female empowerment.

Neither Beyoncé nor her representatives commented on the release of "Bow Down/I Been On", and many journalists questioned the nature of its release in the context of the release of her upcoming album. Further confusion arose when portions of other tracks "Grown Woman" and "Standing on the Sun" were used for television advertising campaigns, with a similar lack of explanation about their purpose. Through much of 2013, the media intermittently reported that the album was delayed or scrapped, with one story alleging Beyoncé had scrapped fifty songs in favor of starting again. In July 2013, a spokesperson for Beyoncé denied speculation that her album had been delayed, stating there was no official release date to begin with and that when a date is set, it would be announced via an official press release. There was considerable confusion among music journalists and fans as Beyoncé engaged in extensive touring, while not discussing the album or its release.

== Recording and production ==
The original plan was to create the entire album in a month and a half, but in the end it took a year and a half. Beyoncé rented a 40-bedroom mansion for the recording process. Recording sessions began in mid-2012, taking place at Beyoncé and her husband Jay-Z's residence in the Hamptons. She invited the "world's best" producers and songwriters to accompany them, including Sia, Timbaland, Eric Bellinger, Benny Blanco, Ryan Tedder, Justin Timberlake, and The-Dream. Beyoncé described the atmosphere as unconventional, saying, "we had dinners with the producers every day, like a family ... it was like a camp. Weekends off. You could go and jump in the pool and ride bikes ... the ocean and grass and sunshine ... it was really a safe place." She would spend the majority of her day with her newborn daughter, taking some hours out to record music. The album's opening track "Pretty Hurts", co-written by Sia, was completed during these sessions. The project was suspended until 2013 due to touring and was relocated to Jungle City and Oven Studios in New York City, where most of the album was recorded. In an interview for Vogue in January 2013, Jason Gay described Beyoncé's attention to detail as "obsessive" when observing her studio, noting the vision boards she created for inspiration, which contained potential song titles, old album covers and pictures of performances.

"Haunted"
The first part of "Haunted"—known as "Ghost" (Note: "Haunted" is a two-part song which is sometimes known as "Ghost/Haunted". The audio disc combines both parts and refers to it collectively as "Haunted", while the visual disc recognizes them as different videos.)— was one of the earliest compositions of Beyoncé and Boots. Beyoncé raps a stream of consciousness with robotic vocal inflections over slow, layered guitars inspired by the work of English electronic musician Aphex Twin.

In mid-2013, the relatively unknown artist Boots signed a publishing deal with Jay-Z's Roc Nation. In an interview for Pitchfork after the album's release, Boots was coy when answering questions about how Beyoncé discovered his demo or about his work before the project, only confirming his signing. In June 2013, they met in person for the first time and Boots presented Beyoncé with material he felt would resonate with her. However, Beyoncé was more interested in his experimental material, and he reluctantly played her his song "Haunted" on his cell phone. At a later meeting, he played her a stream of consciousness rap called "Ghost", which he wrote after an exasperating meeting with a potential record label. Boots began by composing a melody that reminded him of a hypnotic state, then layering guitar arpeggios to resemble the work of English electronic musician Aphex Twin. "Ghost" subsequently became the first half of "Haunted"; he later described Beyoncé as the "only visionary in the room" for her ability to find potential in scraps of songs. Following these sessions, Boots went on to work on 80 percent of Beyoncé.

While recording in New York City, the previously released "Bow Down" was incorporated into a track that became "Flawless". During its composition, Beyoncé chose to interpolate a portion of Chimamanda Ngozi Adichie's TED talk "We Should All Be Feminists" into it as she identified with her interpretations of feminism. Beyoncé used organic approaches when writing and recording "Drunk in Love" and "Partition". When working with Detail and Timbaland on a beat that became "Drunk in Love", she was inspired by what she described as pure enjoyment, as she and Jay-Z freestyled their verses for the track in the studio. Similarly, the bassline of "Partition", which Beyoncé found reminiscent of hip hop music during her early romance with Jay-Z, influenced her to accompany the track with sexual lyrics. She took to a microphone without pen and paper and rapped the first verse, finding herself initially embarrassed by the explicitness of the lyrics. When composing "Partition", a rap known as "Yoncé" was used as the opening of the track, the beat of which was built by Justin Timberlake banging on buckets in the studio.

Only four songs were not recorded entirely in New York studios: "Superpower" and "Heaven", which were partially recorded in California; "No Angel", which was composed in London; and "XO", which was recorded in Berlin and Sydney. Although the demo of "XO" was recorded when Beyoncé had contracted a sinus infection, the vocals were never re-recorded because she felt their imperfections fit the song. In October, the album began taking shape and "Standing on the Sun" and "Grown Woman" were removed (Note: Although "Standing on the Sun" and "Grown Woman" were removed from the audio track listing, "Grown Woman" was added as a bonus video on the DVD. "Grown Woman" was officially released on December 13, 2023 to celebrate the tenth anniversary of this album.)—songs which had been previewed in 2013 on television advertisements—from Beyoncé to fit its minimalist approach. During Thanksgiving week, the vocals on the album were edited and producers were notified to submit their final cuts. Beyoncé spent less time on vocal production than she had on her previous projects, instead focusing on perfecting the album's music. Beyoncé was mastered at Sterling Sound in New York City. In total, eighty songs were recorded for the album.

== Visuals ==
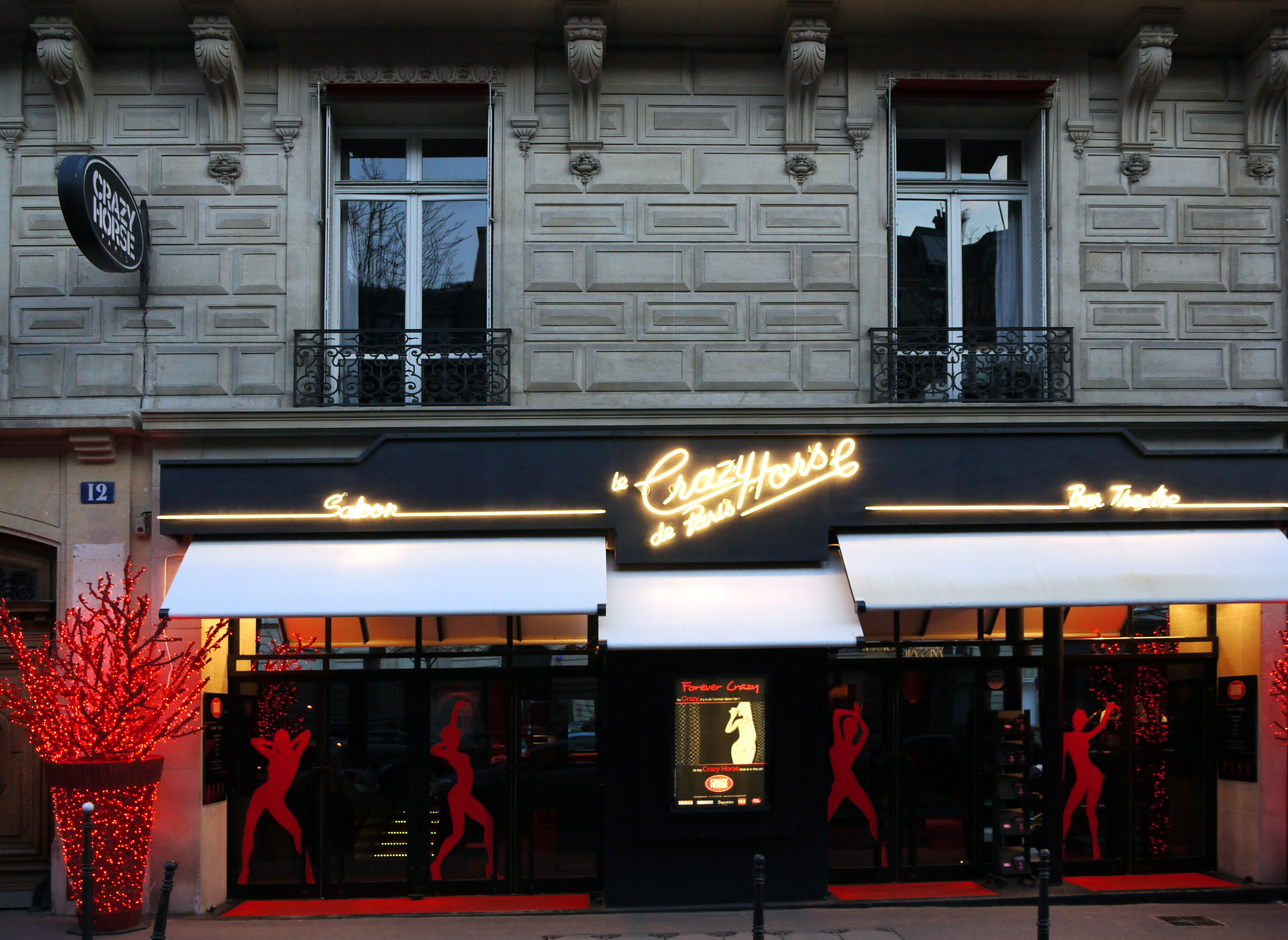
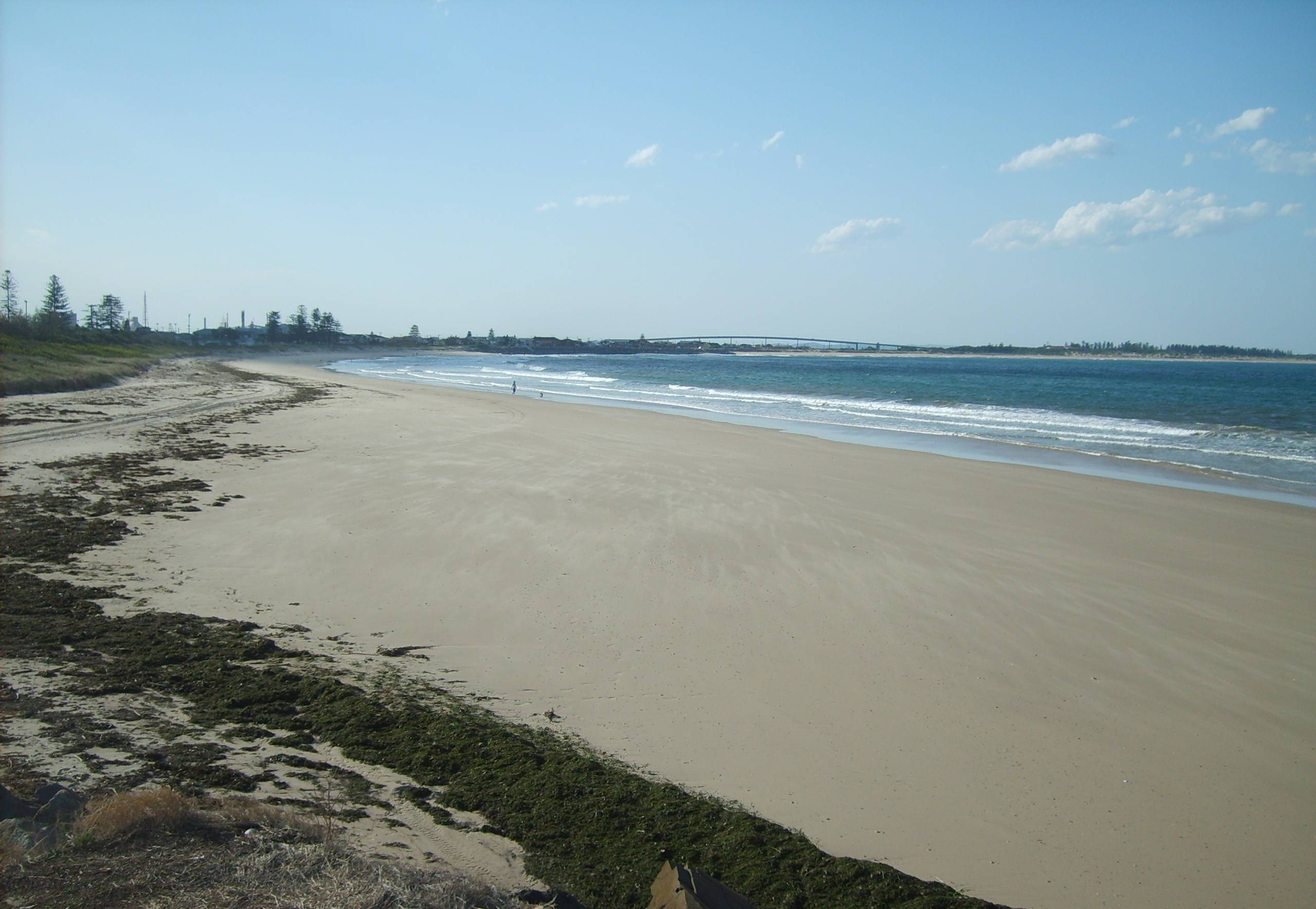
Beyoncé filmed several music videos in different locations, including Crazy Horse (left) and Stockton Beach, Australia (right).

Beyoncé first considered creating a "visual album" in June 2013, when only three or four songs had been completed. Explaining her motivation, she said she would often connect images, childhood memories, emotions and fantasies to songs she was composing, and that she "wanted people to hear the songs with the story that's in my head as that's what makes it mine". She highlighted the immersive experience of Michael Jackson's Thriller (1983) as the principal influence for creating a body of work that "people would hear things differently and ... actually be able to see the whole vision of the album".

The videos were filmed between June and November 2013 in various countries as the singer traveled on her world tour. Todd Tourso, who directed the videos for "Jealous" and "Heaven", served as the creative director for the entire project. Much of his role concerned liaising between Beyoncé, who for most videos already had concepts, and the respective directors who also had propositions. As most videos were shot outside of the United States, the crew surrounding the videos was small, consisting only of Tourso, the director of photography and producer, as well as Beyoncé and her stylist, makeup artist and security. When filming in public, Beyoncé would wear in-ear headphones instead of having the music played out loud, in order to maintain the secrecy of the project and prevent any songs from leaking. By post-production, the songwriting process began to converge with the content of the visuals and Beyoncé watched unedited footage to fit the music to the visuals. "Flawless", "Rocket" and "Mine" were noted as having been changed by their visual counterparts, Tourso commenting that "she would rewrite some lines, or she would add certain audio, or she would add bridges" and said that "it would complete the picture of where the audio needed to go".

Several videos were intended to demonstrate the album's central theme of "finding the beauty in imperfection". While working on "Flawless", Beyoncé was reminded of her loss on television competition Star Search as a child, which she saw as a defining moment in her career, and believed that the competition had taught her how to embrace imperfection in the future. The theme was represented in the videos by the recurring use of trophies, which the singer saw as referencing "all of the sacrifice I have made as a kid, all of the time that I lost". It was also carried into how the visuals were created, with the videos for "Drunk in Love", "Yoncé", "No Angel", "XO" and "Blue" shot without prior preparation, as the singer found enjoyment in the spontaneity of the filming locations and in resisting the urge to perfect them. Noting some of the visuals' explicit content and exposure of her body, Beyoncé said she found shooting them liberating and expressed her intention to demonstrate sexuality as a power that women should have, and not lose after becoming a mother. She went on to say, "I know finding my sensuality, getting back into my body, being proud of growing up, it was important to me that I expressed that ... I know that there are so many women who feel the same way".

== Music and lyrics ==
Beyoncé is a fourteen-track set with seventeen short films: a video for each audio track, two extra videos to accompany the two-part songs "Haunted" and "Partition", as well as a bonus video for "Grown Woman", which lacked an official audio counterpart until its standalone release on the album's tenth anniversary. Departing from the traditional R&B leanings of its predecessor, 4 (2011), Beyoncé's songs are predominantly alternative R&B. (Note: Chris DeVille, writing in Stereogum five months after Beyoncé's release argues that alternative R&B reached its saturation point in early 2014. He identifies Beyoncé as an artist whose recent output experimented with alternative sounds within the R&B genre, thus making her music more accessible to typical fans of underground music despite her being one of "R&B's foremost superstars".) Musically, the album's electro-R&B soundscape may be located in the post-dubstep era, fusing electronic music with R&B and soul. The album's dark, moody production is more textured than previous releases and songs are characterized by heavy bass and loud hi-hats, as well as prominent synthesizers. A sense of restraint appears across most songs "with subdued pulses, ambient effects and throbbing grooves that sneak up on you, threatening to explode but only occasionally transforming".

The album adopts unconventional song structure and as Evan Rytlewski of The A.V. Club noted, many songs "[emphasize] moody, shifting beats and drawn-out vibe sessions" and slowly unfurl. This is particularly prominent on "Haunted" and "Partition" which function as two-part suites. The dream-like state created on "Haunted" is ushered in with a stream of consciousness rap entitled "Ghost" which transitions from "smoky ethereality to off-kilter club beat", amid a shifting bassline and ghostly keyboards. "Partition" begins with "Yoncé", a slick rap set over a simple Middle Eastern rhythm. The song is divided by a brief interlude of camera clicks and the whirring of a car window, before launching into a second-half that melds synthesizer pulses with finger snaps to create a Southern hip hop bassline. Over this, the song follows a candid narrative that describes sex in the back of a limousine while traveling to a nightclub.

Several critics noted the album's extensive exploration of sexuality. Having been a singer since the age of nine, Beyoncé felt "stifled" by the perception she was a role model for young children, and by her thirties, believed she had "earned the right to ... express any and every side of [her]self". Addressing the album's sexual content specifically, Beyoncé said: "I don't at all have any shame about being sexual and I'm not embarrassed about it and I don't feel like I have to protect that side of me." Several critics described Beyoncé's sex songs as a celebration of monogamy. "Drunk in Love" is a duet with her husband Jay-Z, and features lyrics heavily laden with double entendres that explore lust within their sexual relationship. It fuses intermittent trap beats with heavy bass, skittering synthesizers and drums, and Arabic-scale vocal arpeggios. Beyoncé's vocals are diverse, including a melodramatic chorus sung in her upper register and a half-rapped second verse. "Blow" veers from a thumping jazz beat created with sparse piano chords and guitars to a "swinging electro-funk groove" with elements of neo-disco. Its erotic, tongue-in-cheek lyrics include a running cunnilingus metaphor of "licking Skittles" in its chorus. The slow-jam "Rocket" is a homage to D'Angelo's soul-infused "Untitled (How Does It Feel)" (2000). Described by Entertainment Weekly's Nick Catucci as a "slippery, six-and-a-half-minute funk excursion", Beyoncé adopts a slow, harmonious vocal as she instructs her love interest to watch her perform a striptease.

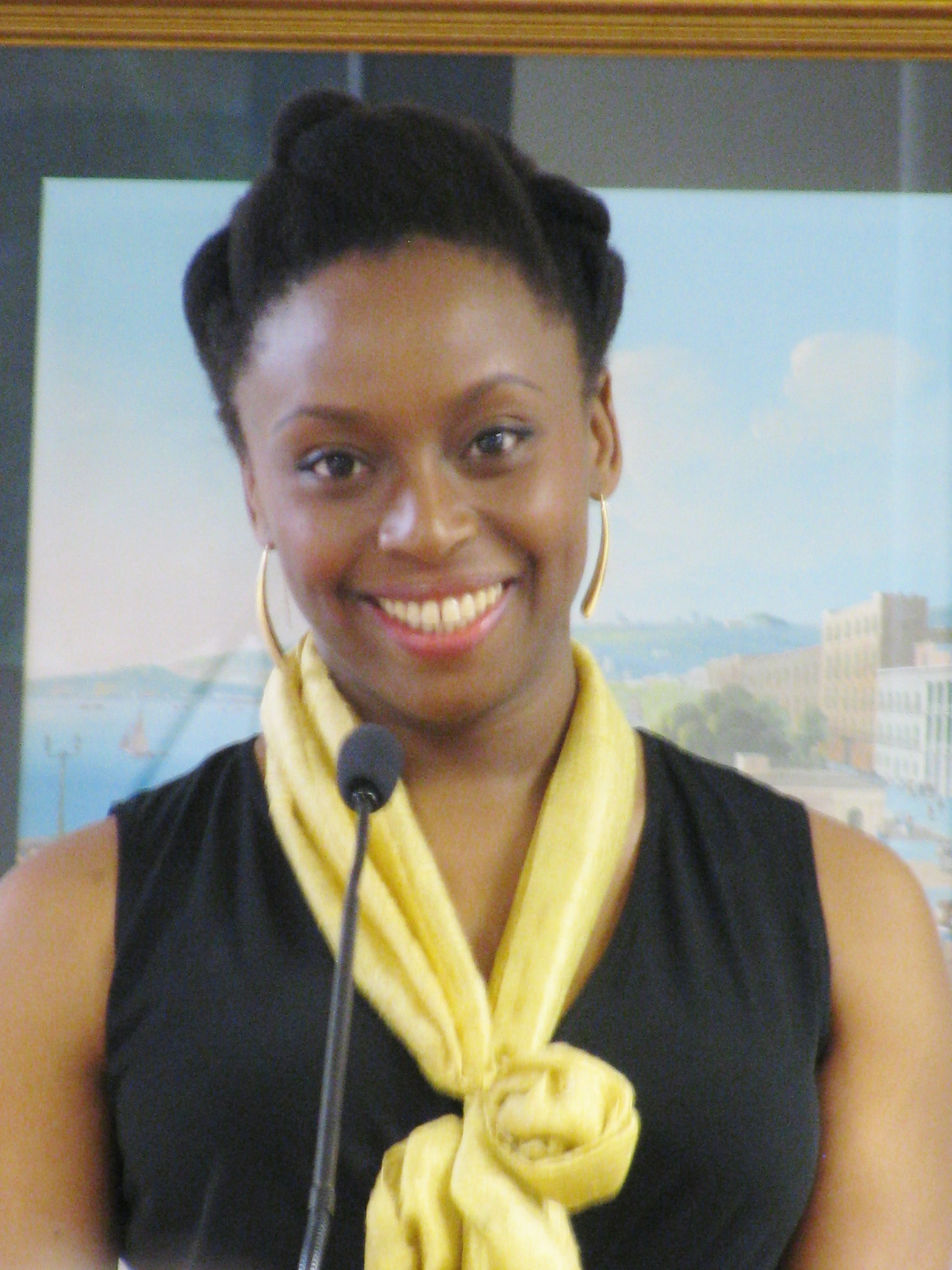
Excerpts from the 2014 speech "We Should All Be Feminists" by Chimamanda Ngozi Adichie (pictured) are sampled in "Flawless".

Like her previous albums, the record is feminist, with greater exploration of gender issues and combines that perspective with "an unwavering look at black female sexual agency". Soraya McDonald of The Washington Post viewed Beyoncé as significant to black feminism as it celebrates black female sexuality in mainstream music and in the context of hip hop, where it is typically only shown through the male perspective. The album's most explicit commentary on gender is the three-part "Flawless". It opens with the earlier released "Bow Down", before segueing into an excerpt of a speech by Chimamanda Ngozi Adichie on the socialization of girls. The final part uses a staccato, trap beat as Beyoncé reflects on her own feminist attitudes, encouraging self-acceptance among women and criticizing misogynist sentiments.

Other songs allude to darker themes of fear and personal insecurities. Beyoncé noted that the album displayed "sides of [her] that only a few people had seen", adding that "all of us want happiness ... sometimes you have to take the insecurities to get to the secure place. And all of those things I feel happy to express". Caitlin White of The 405 believed the songs "hold forth on the most important issues in a woman's life by delving into [the singer's] personal experience with them". "Jealous" addresses fidelity and features lyrics in which the protagonist experiences "promises, suspicion and potential revenge". It contains an "uncanny mix of tones and styles", most prominently a morose bassline replete with electronic yelps. "Mine", a song with elements of futuristic R&B and jazz, is self-reflective, with lyrics that reference marital strife and difficulties with postpartum depression. The power pop opening track "Pretty Hurts" is a self-empowerment anthem that decries society's obsession with harmful and unattainable standards of beauty. The song uses audio snippets of beauty pageants in which Beyoncé competed to frame the song in the context of her childhood.

Beyoncé's vocal production is diverse; several songs are half-rapped and half-sung with particular use of falsetto and head voice. The Telegraph's Neil McCormick notes that while the singer uses her expansive vocal range, unlike her previous releases, she refrains from belting and vocal runs to increase tension in the music. "No Angel", a chillwave song with influences of minimalist hip-hop, is noted for its use of the falsetto vocal register, with a delivery that is "threatening to fray". The doo wop-inspired duet with Frank Ocean "Superpower" is sung in the lower register of both singers, while employing girl group harmonies similar to Beyoncé's work in Destiny's Child. The love song "XO" uses several vocal techniques to evoke a celebration of love and life, including echo and several hooks. Its ascending chorus lines use call and response, as well as backing vocals of a sing-along crowd, as Beyoncé sings of how her "darkest nights" are enlightened by her lover's face. The album's closing tracks are midtempo ballads "Heaven" and "Blue". "Heaven" is an emotive, piano-led hymn with gospel elements, while "Blue" is built on a piano melody over which Beyoncé sings of the love for her daughter, using her full vocal range.

Six additional tracks are included on the album's Platinum Edition reissue: two newly recorded songs and four remixed versions of existing tracks. "7/11" is an uptempo hip hop piece and uses Auto-Tune. The track incorporates several rapping verses by Beyoncé, with production likened to "Bow Down/I Been On". "Ring Off" is described as a midtempo reggae ballad that features dancehall rhythms with slight elements of dubstep, and addresses the end of the marriage between Beyoncé's parents, Tina and Mathew Knowles. "Standing on the Sun", which was excluded from the album's original release, was included as a remixed version with guest vocals from Mr. Vegas.

== Release and promotion ==
I miss that immersive experience, now people only listen to a few seconds of song on their iPods and they don't really invest in the whole experience. It's all about the single, and the hype. It's so much that gets between the music and the art and the fans. I felt like, I don't want anybody to get the message, when my record is coming out. I just want this to come out when it's ready and from me to my fans.

— Beyoncé discussing her intention behind Beyoncé's unconventional release.

Throughout 2013, Beyoncé worked on the project in strict secrecy, sharing details of the album with a small circle of people and continually shifting the deadline, which was only finalized a week before its release. She later explained that her intent was to reinstate the idea of an album release as a significant, exciting event that had lost meaning in the face of hype created around singles.

Tourso and his small team of designers were tasked with designing Beyoncé's album cover, which he found difficult because it was a visual album and thus "inundated with imagery". Part of Beyoncé's original notes were that she wanted "no pink" and did not want her "[buttocks] on the cover." Over three months, he considered over a hundred options, before returning to his first idea. He was inspired by the cover of Metallica's eponymous fifth studio album (1991) to create a bold statement, specifically to deviate from a "beauty shot" of Beyoncé which he felt would be expected. They used a font similar to placards used in boxing matches to represent abrasive masculinity, which was contrasted by the grayish-pink font which they described as "a subversion of femininity".

In early December 2013, Beyoncé and her management company Parkwood Entertainment held meetings about its release with executives from Columbia Records and the iTunes Store, using the codename "Lily" for the album. Meetings were also held with Facebook executives in regard to advertising that resulted in the album benefiting from the social network's then new "Auto Play" feature for videos. On December 9, 2013, Rob Stringer, Chairman of Columbia Records, knowingly told media that the album would be released at some point in 2014 and it would be "monumental".

On December 13, 2013, the album was released in the early hours of the morning without any prior announcement or promotion exclusively on the iTunes Store. The singer commented that she was "bored" of her music being marketed as it had been done previously, and wanted its release to be a different experience for her fans. The album was available exclusively on iTunes Stores until December 20, 2013, when physical copies were distributed to other retailers. Parkwood Entertainment had a seventy-two-hour turnaround from the moment the album was released online to prepare its physical release.

I had just got off the stage, I had a glass of wine and my cousin Angie was like, "Are you alright?" because I was talking to myself and I was terrified. I was so scared. I'd already envisioned 'people are going to hate it, why didn't I say anything?' It's just things that we all go through, it's just human. I was really nervous because this was a huge risk. [It went] live on iTunes and you know, you're just waiting for the first comment. And [by] the next morning... (dances and audience cheers).

— Beyoncé presenting a video screening for the album at the SVA Theater.

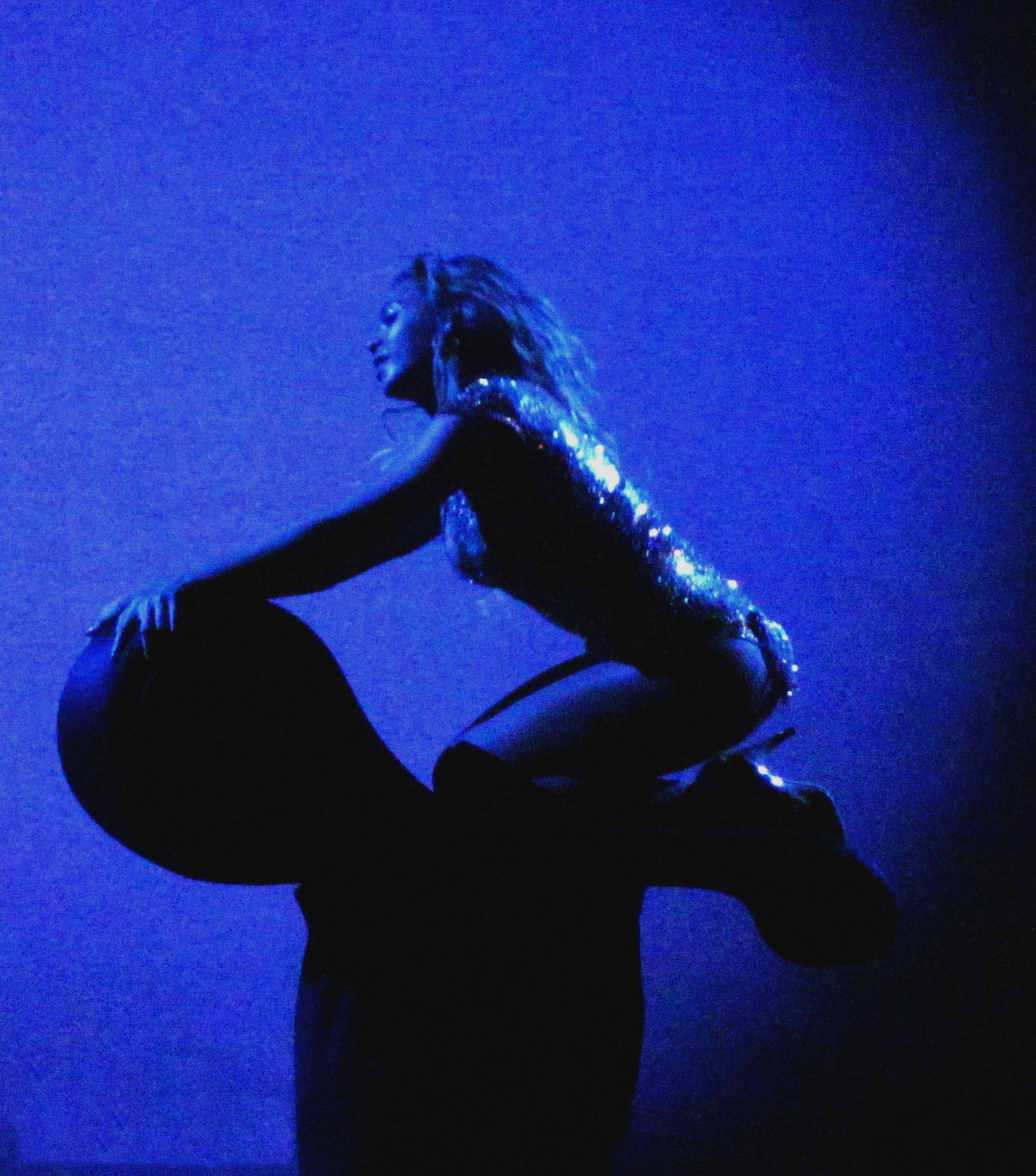
Beyoncé performing at The Mrs. Carter Show World Tour in London

As soon as the album became exclusively available to iTunes Stores, Sony Music handed down an edict that forbade retailers to put the album up for pre-order, as to further protect the exclusivity with the iTunes Store. It was then reported that American retailers Target and Amazon Music refused to sell the physical copies of the album. According to a Target spokesperson, the store was only interested in retailing albums that were released digitally and physically simultaneously. On December 21, 2013, all the videos from the album were screened at the SVA Theater in New York City.

I've never done anything so brave in my life. The amount of personal growth from this project is unlike anything I've ever done. I took all of my insecurities, all of my doubts, all of my fears, and everything I've learned [and] I applied it into this project.

— Beyoncé at SVA Theater.

After the album's release, Beyoncé performed "XO" during the remaining stops of the North American leg of The Mrs. Carter Show World Tour in December 2013. In early 2014, she performed "Drunk in Love" for the first time at the 56th Annual Grammy Awards on January 26. "XO"'s first televised performance was at the 2014 BRIT Awards on February 19, marking her first performance at the ceremony since the one held in 2004. Later that month, songs from the album were added to the set list of the second European leg of The Mrs. Carter Show World Tour. All the music videos from the album were screened at the 2014 Los Angeles Film Festival on June 13 along with commentary from three of the videos' directors who were present at the ceremony. To further promote the album, Beyoncé embarked on her first co-headlining stadium tour with Jay-Z. The On the Run Tour kicked off in Miami on June 25, 2014, and ended in Paris on September 13, 2014. A pre-recorded performance of "Partition" from the tour was broadcast at the 2014 BET Awards on June 29. Beyoncé performed a sixteen-minute medley of the album's songs at the 2014 MTV Video Music Awards on August 24.

On December 12, 2014, just about one year after the release of Beyoncé, a short film entitled Yours and Mine was uploaded to Beyoncé's website and to YouTube. The entirely black and white spoken-word film, which features behind-the-scenes footage and repurposed imagery from the music videos of Beyoncé, was described as "a retrospective short film celebrating the one-year anniversary of the self-titled visual album".

Reports of a follow-up record first surfaced early November, speculating that a second volume of the Beyoncé album was slated to be surprise released in November. One of the songs was titled "Donk", a planned collaboration with Nicki Minaj that was officially registered to the American Society of Composers, Authors and Publishers database; the full song leaked online in September 2023. Parkwood Entertainment dispelled rumors of a leaked track listing for the record, stating it was "completely made up".

The album received a reissue on November 24, 2014, subtitled Platinum Edition. The package includes four discs, including two additional discs of new material: More is an audio disc containing two newly recorded songs and four remixes of existing songs, while Live is a video disc containing ten live performances filmed during The Mrs. Carter Show World Tour (2013–14) and previously broadcast on June 29 by HBO with Beyonce: X10, a 10-episode series of four-minute segments of concert performances that debuted weekly before new episodes of True Blood. More and Live was also made available as an individual EP on digital platforms, under the title Beyoncé: More Only. Platinum Edition also marked the first release of Beyoncé on Spotify.

== Singles ==
Two lead singles were released from Beyoncé. "XO" impacted hot adult contemporary radio in the United States on December 16, 2013. The following day, it impacted urban contemporary, rhythmic contemporary and contemporary radio stations in the United States. "XO" became a minor hit, peaking at number forty-five on the US Billboard Hot 100, however, it reached the top twenty in several international markets.

Accompanying the release of "XO", the other lead single "Drunk in Love", featuring Jay-Z, was serviced to urban contemporary radio stations in the United States on December 17, 2013. "Drunk in Love" peaked at number two on the US Billboard Hot 100 and number one on the US Hot R&B/Hip-Hop Songs and Rhythmic charts. It also peaked at number seven in New Zealand and number nine in France and the United Kingdom. The song was certified platinum by the Recording Industry Association of America (RIAA), denoting sales of one million digital copies.

"Partition" impacted urban contemporary radio in the United States on February 25, 2014, as the album's third single. It peaked at number twenty-three on the US Billboard Hot 100 and number one on the US Dance Club Songs.

On April 24, 2014, the music video for the fourth single "Pretty Hurts" was made available for streaming via Time magazine's official website to accompany Beyoncé's feature as one of the world's most influential people. The song impacted contemporary hit and rhythmic radio in the United States on June 10, 2014 and contemporary hit radio in the United Kingdom on June 23, 2014.

The fifth single, a remix of "Flawless" featuring Nicki Minaj was released from the album on August 12, 2014. It peaked at number forty-one on the US Hot 100. "7/11" and "Ring Off", from the Platinum Edition reissue, were released as the album's sixth and seventh singles on November 25 and November 28, 2014, respectively.

== Critical reception ==
Professional ratings
Aggregate scores
Source	Rating
AnyDecentMusic?	8.1/10
Metacritic	85/100
Review scores
Source	Rating
AllMusic	5/5 stars
The Daily Telegraph	4/5 stars
Entertainment Weekly	A−
The Guardian	4/5 stars
Los Angeles Times	3/4 stars
NME	8/10
Pitchfork	8.8/10
Rolling Stone	3.5/5 stars
Spin	9/10
The Times	4/5 stars

Beyoncé received universal critical acclaim. At Metacritic, which assigns a weighted mean rating out of 100 to reviews from mainstream publications, the album received a high score of 85, based on 34 reviews. Critics generally commended the album as thematically and musically bold, as well as emphasizing its visual aspect and surprise release; at the time of release, many said it was her magnum opus. Summarizing the album for Pitchfork, Jillian Mapes calls Beyoncé "MJ-level talent met pop-perfectionism in a moment that defined album-cycle disruption [and] a victory lap Bey took as pop feminism's reigning goddess".

The album's exploration of sexuality was particularly well received by reviewers. The New York Times' chief critic Jon Pareles described the tracks as "steamy and sleek, full of erotic exploits and sultry vocals" noting that "every so often, for variety, they turn vulnerable, compassionate or pro-feminist". Caitlin White, writing for The 405, characterized Beyoncé as a feminist text. She noted that the tracks demonstrate Beyoncé's desire to retain complete sexual agency, while also forgoing the expectations of pop songcraft by placing female pleasure at the forefront unquestioningly. Robert Christgau admired the album's "sex sequence" of songs, where for "over seven well-differentiated tracks", Beyoncé "performs the unlikely feat of conveying an open-ended eroticism that varies because [she] knows eroticism does, for each of us in our individual responses as well as for her". PopMatters' David Amidon similarly praised the album's honest, highly sexual nature, observing it was "her first attempt at bridging an audience, making music that makes the men want to hear what she has to say and the women feel like they can say it to men as well".

Other reviews recognized that the album eschewed contemporary R&B in favor of more experimental compositions. Pitchfork writer Carrie Battan of the same publication wrote that Beyoncé was "exploring sounds and ideas at the grittier margins of popular music" and rejecting "traditional pop structures in favor of atmosphere". Spin's Anupa Mistry felt it was "more textured than its predecessors in both sound and content", and applauded the singer's transition to a maturer sound of "big-hook message pop, multi-directional, mood-shifting suites and delicately resonant R&B ballads". Noting the lack of "guaranteed hits", NME believed that the "low-key, moody production throws the spotlight on the words and the images brought to play" and described it as her most experimental work to date. Rolling Stone's pop critic Rob Sheffield found Beyoncé's boldness among its best attributes, believing the album is at its "strongest when it goes for full-grown electro soul with an artsy boho edge". Mikael Wood of the Los Angeles Times highlighted a desire to push creative boundaries among the tracks and admired "how the music similarly blends the intimate and the extravagant", while Entertainment Weekly writer Nick Catucci concluded that the album was characterized by "clashing impulses—between strength and escape, megapop and fresh sounds, big messages and resonant lyrics".

Praise was also reserved for Beyoncé's vocal performance. The Telegraph's Neil McCormick declared Beyoncé as "one of the most technically gifted vocalists in pop" favoring her "gospel power, hip-hop flow and [huge] range". He was particularly complimentary of the vocal restraint displayed across the tracks that was absent from previous releases. Kitty Empire of The Observer noted the diverseness of her vocals on the album's up-tempo songs and found the singer ranging between "squeaky sexed-up falsettos, hood rat rapping, wordless ecstasies and effortless swoops". Clash regarded her voice most effective on the album's ballads, where they commented on how diversely her vocals conveyed feelings of love and described her "power and control [as] breathtaking".

== Accolades ==
Despite being released in December when several publications had completed their year-end lists, Beyoncé was ranked the best album of the year by Billboard, Houston Chronicle and Los Angeles Times, while Spin ranked it the best R&B album of the year. As of January 2015, Billboard also named Beyoncé as the second best album of the first half of the 2010s. The album was ranked within the top ten on lists by Associated Press, HitFix, MTV News, Club Fonograma and Digital Spy. Beyoncé was ranked at number eleven on Metacritic's twenty-five best-reviewed albums of 2013. On the annual Pazz and Jop mass critics poll of the year's best in music, the album was ranked at number four. Robert Christgau, the poll's creator, ranked it eighteenth on his own year-end list. Some publications included Beyoncé on their 2014 lists, and it was deemed the best album of the year by Vibe, Pretty Much Amazing and Nate Chinen of The New York Times. Consequence of Sound listed the effort as the eighteenth best one from 2014 and Tiny Mix Tapes, the fortieth one. Pitchfork named Beyoncé the fourteenth best album of the decade (2010–2014) so far; Fact listed the album as the ninth best one from the same period.

Beyoncé was included in best-of lists of the 2010s decade by several publications, including Pitchfork (3rd), The Associated Press (3rd), Stereogum (7th), Billboard (11th), Rolling Stone (26th), Consequence of Sound (79th), NME (55th), Uproxx (33rd), Tiny Mix Tapes (35th), Paste (40th) and Spex (57th).

Spin considered the album the thirty-eighth best one of the past thirty years (1985–2014) and Q named it one of the greatest albums of the past thirty years. On Rolling Stone's "500 Greatest Albums of All Time" list, Beyoncé was placed at number 81, citing the album's "musical scope and feminist outreach" and adding that it "proved that nobody else was on her level". The Guardian included the project at number 9 on their ranking of the 100 best albums of the 21st century. Beyoncé was also included on the 2016 update of the 1001 Albums You Must Hear Before You Die. Consequence of Sound named the album the 37th best one of the last 15 years (2007–2022). Apple Music ranked Beyoncé thirty-sixth on their list of the 100 Best Albums ever created. Paste listed the album at number 185 on their list of the 300 Greatest Albums of All Time.

The album was nominated for five Grammy Awards at the 57th Annual Grammy Awards (2015), including Album of the Year, Best Urban Contemporary Album, Best Surround Sound Album and Best R&B Song and Best R&B Performance for "Drunk in Love", winning the latter three. In a recreation of an infamous incident at the 2009 MTV Video Music Awards, (Note: The highly-publicized incident—sometimes dubbed "Kanyegate"—refers to West's interruption of Taylor Swift during her acceptance speech for the Best Female Video award at the 2009 VMAs. West took the microphone from Swift in protest of Beyoncé's "Single Ladies (Put a Ring on It)" (2008) not winning, declaring it "one of the best videos of all time".) Kanye West briefly appeared on stage during the presentation of the Album of the Year award to Beck's Morning Phase (2014) in protest of Beyoncé not winning. While it initially appeared to be a joke as West returned to his seat, he said in comments following the ceremony that Beck "needs to respect artistry and he should have given his award to Beyoncé". He later apologized for his comments.

At the 2014 MTV Video Music Awards, Beyoncé was presented with the Michael Jackson Video Vanguard Award for her work on the visual album, performing a sixteen-minute medley of its songs. Van Tofler, president and CEO of Viacom, noted that their choice for the Vanguard Award was influenced by this project, saying, "when [she] put out the record and the way she did it in such a visual way, she was the most obvious choice". She won a further three awards, Best Collaboration for "Drunk in Love", and Best Cinematography and Best Video with a Social Message for "Pretty Hurts". The album was nominated for World's Best Album at the 2014 World Music Awards and Album of the Year at the 2014 MTV Video Music Awards Japan. It also received two nominations at the 2014 Billboard Music Awards for Top Billboard 200 Album and Top R&B Album, while "Drunk in Love" was nominated for Top R&B Song. At the 2014 mtvU Woodie Awards, Beyoncé won in the category Did It My Way Woodie, awarded for the album's release strategy. It won in the category for Album of the Year at the 2014 Soul Train Music Awards and Favorite Soul/R&B Album at the American Music Awards of 2014.

== Commercial performance ==
During its first day of release in the United States, Beyoncé sold 80,000 units in three hours and a total of 430,000 digital copies within 24 hours. In its second day, the album sold 120,000 units, which brought its two-day sales total to 550,000. Billboard predicted it to sell around 600,000 digital copies by the end of the tracking week on December 15, 2013. Beyoncé debuted at number one on the Billboard 200, with three-day sales of 617,213 digital copies. This gave Beyoncé her fifth solo consecutive number-one album, sixth overall, including Destiny's Child's Survivor (2001). The album's debut made her the first female artist to have her first five studio albums debut atop the chart, beating Britney Spears' record of four in a row. It also became the largest debut sales week for a female artist in 2013, and the highest debut sales week of her solo career. The album also gave her the three largest sales weeks by any female and she became the only female to sell 300,000 copies within a week in 2013 and became the first person in the 2010s to score 300,000 copies in each of its first 3 weeks. Beyoncé marks the fourth-largest sales week of an album during 2013, behind Justin Timberlake's The 20/20 Experience, Eminem's The Marshall Mathers LP 2 and Drake's Nothing Was the Same.

In its second week, the album remained at number one, selling an additional 374,000 copies. Ten days after its release, Beyoncé had sold 991,000 copies in the US, making it the best-selling album by a female artist in 2013. A third week at number-one with sales of 310,000 copies brought the album's US sales to 1.3 million after 17 days of release, positioning it as the eighth-best-selling album of the year, and the first to enter the year-end top 10 based on just three weeks of sales availability in the Nielsen SoundScan era. In its fourth week, sales reached 1.43 million, surpassing the total sales of Beyoncé's previous album, 4, which was released in 2011 and had sold 1.39 million in total in the two years since its release. Following Beyoncé performing at the 2014 MTV Video Music Awards, sales of the album in the US increased by 181%. The record sold 878,000 copies in the US in 2014 alone, becoming the sixth-best-selling album of the year. As of December 2024, Beyoncé has been certified six-times platinum by the Recording Industry Association of America (RIAA) for the sale of five million units, and all fourteen tracks are certified gold or higher for the sale of 500,000 units, making it the fourth female album in history to have all its tracks RIAA certified.

On December 16, Apple Inc. announced that Beyoncé was the fastest selling album in the history of the iTunes Store, both in the United States and worldwide. It sold 828,773 digital copies worldwide in its first three days, and topped the iTunes Store charts in one-hundred-and-four countries. Six days after its release, Beyoncé had sold one million digital copies on iTunes Stores worldwide. Beyoncé debuted at number five on the UK Albums Chart on December 15, with two-day sales of 67,858 digital copies. The Official Charts Company's chief executive Martin Talbot noted that "few (if any) albums have sold as many digital copies in such a short space of time." In its fifth week, the album climbed to a new peak of number two. It was certified platinum by the British Phonographic Industry (BPI) on February 7, 2014, denoting shipments of 300,000 copies. As of April 2016, Beyoncé has sold 505,000 copies in the United Kingdom. On August 3, 2018, Beyoncé was certified double platinum by the BPI, denoting shipments of 600,000.

The album entered the Canadian Albums Chart at number one, with 35,000 digital copies sold. It debuted at number twenty-four on the French Albums Chart with two-days sales of 12,100 digital copies, and peaked at number thirteen in its fifth week. The album debuted atop the Dutch Albums Chart, giving Beyoncé her first number-one album in the Netherlands. In Australia, Beyoncé entered the ARIA Albums Chart at number two, with first-week sales of 31,102 digital copies. The album topped the chart in its third week, becoming Beyoncé's first number-one album in Australia. It spent three consecutive weeks at number one and was certified platinum by the Australian Recording Industry Association (ARIA) for shipping 70,000 copies. In New Zealand, Beyoncé debuted at number two and was certified gold by Recorded Music NZ (RMNZ) for sales of 7,500 copies; it was later certified quadruple platinum. According to the International Federation of the Phonographic Industry (IFPI), within the last nineteen days of 2013, the album sold 2.3 million units worldwide, becoming the tenth-best-selling album of 2013. The album also went on to become the 20th-best-selling album of 2014. Worldwide, Beyoncé has sold more than eight million copies as of November 2016 and has generated over 1 billion streams as of March 2015.

In 2014, Beyoncé was ranked as the second-most popular album of the year on the Billboard 200, only behind Disney's Frozen soundtrack.

== Legacy ==
According to Billboard, as of 2022, Beyoncé is one of the 15 best-performing 21st-century albums without any of its singles being number-one hits on the Billboard Hot 100. The surprising release of Beyoncé caused "hilarious, honest and hysterical" reaction among Beyoncé's fans, and "shock" among other musicians in an effect coined as "Beyoncé Syndrome" by the BBC. According to data provided by Twitter, the release generated over 1.2 million tweets in twelve hours.

Rolling Stone's Rob Sheffield wrote: "The whole project is a celebration of the Beyoncé Philosophy, which boils down to the fact that Beyoncé can do anything the hell she wants to." Peter Robinson of The Guardian hailed the shock release as "Beyoncégeddon", describing it as "a masterclass in both exerting and relinquishing control". Henry Knight for the BBC said "Beyoncé's self-titled album not only proved innovative musically, it rewrote the business model of the industry." Forbes' Zack O'Malley Greenburg included Beyoncé on his "Music Industry Winners 2013" list, noting that the singer "didn't make use of any of the perks of [being signed to a large record label]—the "machine" we're told is so necessary. There was no radio promotion, no single, no advance press of any kind". The marketing strategy of releasing an album with little or no notice was the subject of a case study at Harvard University School of Business. Beyoncé is credited with the popularization of the surprise album, and the act of releasing a project without prior announcement has subsequently been executed by many artists, including Drake, Kanye West, Kendrick Lamar, Rihanna, Azealia Banks, Nicki Minaj, Miley Cyrus, U2, Frank Ocean and Eminem. Canadian musician Grimes named Beyoncé as one of the albums that changed her life, saying that it "revitalized the art of the album" for her".

After the International Federation of the Phonographic Industry (IFPI) announced Friday as Global Release Day, Billboard's Andrew Flanagan thought the album release was among the influencing points in the decision, writing: "After seven months of semi-public back-and-forth, a conversation instigated in part by Aussie piracy and Beyonce's surprise release in December 2013 has resulted in the global recording industry accepting Friday as the release date for new albums." Time named Beyoncé as one of the most influential people of 2014 due to the album release, writing: "In December, she took the world by surprise when she released a new album, complete with videos, and announced it on Facebook and Instagram. Beyoncé shattered music-industry rules – and sales records".

== Track listing ==
=== Standard edition ===
Audio
No.	Title	Writer(s)	Producer(s)	Length
1.	"Pretty Hurts"	Joshua Coleman; Sia Furler; Beyoncé Knowles	Ammo; Knowles	4:17
2.	"Haunted" (contains intro song "Ghost")	Boots; Knowles	Boots; Knowles	6:09
3.	"Drunk in Love" (featuring Jay-Z)	Noel Fisher; Knowles; Shawn Carter; Andre Proctor; Rasool Díaz; Brian Soko; Timothy Mosley; Jerome Harmon	Detail; The Order; Knowles; Timbaland^{[b]}; Harmon^{[b]}; Boots^{[b]}	5:23
4.	"Blow"	Pharrell Williams; Knowles; James Fauntleroy; Mosley; Harmon; Justin Timberlake; Terius Nash	Williams; Knowles; Timbaland^{[a]}; Harmon^{[a]}	5:09
5.	"No Angel"	Caroline Polachek; Knowles; Fauntleroy	Polachek; Knowles; Patrick Wimberly^{[a]}; Fauntleroy^{[a]}; Boots^{[b]}	3:48
6.	"Partition" (contains intro track "Yoncé")	Nash; Knowles; Timberlake; Mosley; Harmon; Dwane Weir; Mike Dean	Timbaland; Harmon; Timberlake; Knowles; Key Wane; Dean^{[b]}; Boots^{[b]}	5:19
7.	"Jealous"	Fisher; Knowles; Proctor; Lyrica Anderson; Díaz; Soko; Boots	Detail; The Order; Knowles; Boots^{[b]}; Hit-Boy^{[b]}; HazeBanga^{[b]}; Proctor^{[b]}	3:04
8.	"Rocket"	Miguel Pimentel; Knowles; Timberlake; Mosley; Harmon; Fauntleroy	Timbaland; Knowles; Harmon^{[a]}	6:31
9.	"Mine" (featuring Drake)	Noah Shebib; Aubrey Graham; Knowles; Jordan Ullman; Sidney Brown; Weir	Shebib; Majid Jordan^{[b]}; Brown^{[b]}	6:18
10.	"XO"	Nash; Ryan Tedder; Knowles	The-Dream; Tedder; Knowles; Hit-Boy^{[b]}; HazeBanga^{[b]}	3:35
11.	"Flawless" (featuring Chimamanda Ngozi Adichie (contains hidden track "Bow Down" in the Intro))	Nash; Knowles; Chauncey Hollis; Raymond Martin; Rashad Muhammad	Hit-Boy; Knowles; Rey Reel Music^{[a]}; HazeBanga^{[a]}; Boots^{[b]}	4:10
12.	"Superpower" (featuring Frank Ocean)	Williams; Frank Ocean; Knowles	Williams; Boots^{[b]}	4:36
13.	"Heaven"	Boots; Knowles	Boots; Knowles	3:50
14.	"Blue" (featuring Blue Ivy)	Boots; Knowles	Boots; Knowles	4:26
Total length:				66:35

Visual
No.	Title	Director(s)	Length
1.	"Pretty Hurts"	Melina Matsoukas	7:04
2.	"Ghost"	Pierre Debusschere	2:31
3.	"Haunted"	Jonas Åkerlund	5:21
4.	"Drunk in Love" (featuring Jay-Z)	Hype Williams	6:21
5.	"Blow"	Williams	5:25
6.	"No Angel"	@lilinternet	3:53
7.	"Yoncé"	Ricky Saiz	2:02
8.	"Partition"	Jake Nava	3:49
9.	"Jealous"	Beyoncé; Francesco Carrozzini; Todd Tourso	3:26
10.	"Rocket"	Beyoncé; Ed Burke; Bill Kirstein	4:30
11.	"Mine" (featuring Drake)	Debusschere	4:59
12.	"XO"	Terry Richardson	3:35
13.	"Flawless" (featuring Chimamanda Ngozi Adichie)	Nava	4:12
14.	"Superpower" (featuring Frank Ocean)	Åkerlund	5:24
15.	"Heaven"	Beyoncé; Tourso	3:55
16.	"Blue" (featuring Blue Ivy)	Beyoncé; Burke; Kirstein	4:35
17.	"Credits"		2:34
18.	"Grown Woman" (bonus video)	Nava	4:24
Total length:			78:00

=== Platinum Edition ===
More
No.	Title	Writer(s)	Producer(s)	Length
1.	"7/11"	Bobby Johnson; Fisher; Knowles; Sidney Swift	Knowles; Johnson; Detail^{[a]}; Sidney Swift^{[a]}; Derek Dixie^{[b]}	3:33
2.	"Flawless (Remix)" (featuring Nicki Minaj)	Nash; Knowles; Hollis; Rey Reel Music; Muhammad; Onika Maraj	Knowles; Hit-Boy; Rey Reel Music; HazeBanga; The-Dream; Dixie^{[c]}; Boots^{[b]}	3:54
3.	"Drunk in Love (Remix)" (featuring Jay-Z and Kanye West)	Fisher; Knowles; Carter; Proctor; Díaz; Soko; Mosley; Harmon; Kanye West; Cydel Young; Malik Yusef; J. Sakiya Sandifer; Dean; Noah Goldstein	Detail; The Order; Knowles; West^{[c]}; Dean^{[c]}; Timbaland^{[b]}; Harmon^{[b]}; Boots^{[b]}; Noah Goldstein^{[b]}	6:35
4.	"Ring Off"	Michael Caren; Knowles; William Lobban-Bean; Geoff Early; Charles Hinshaw; Adam Amezaga; Dixie; Stephen Bishop; Hit-Boy; Dean	Caren; Knowles; Cook Classics^{[a]}; HS87 (Hit-Boy; HazeBanga; Preach Bal4)^{[b]}; Dean^{[b]}; Ariel Rechtshaid^{[b]}; Dixie^{[b]}	3:00
5.	"Blow (Remix)" (featuring Pharrell Williams)	P. Williams; Knowles; Fauntleroy; Mosley; Harmon; Timberlake; Nash	Williams; Knowles; Timbaland^{[a]}; Harmon^{[a]}	5:09
6.	"Standing on the Sun (Remix)" (featuring Mr. Vegas)	Greg Kurstin; Furler; Knowles; Fisher; Proctor; Díaz; Soko	Kurstin; Knowles^{[b]}; P. Williams^{[b]}	4:33
Total length:				26:44

Live
No.	Title	Length
1.	"Run the World (Girls)"	4:01
2.	"Flawless"	4:11
3.	"Get Me Bodied"	4:51
4.	"Blow"	3:59
5.	"Haunted"	4:47
6.	"Drunk in Love" (featuring Jay-Z)	4:07
7.	"1+1"	4:47
8.	"Partition"	4:23
9.	"Heaven"	4:39
10.	"XO"	3:54
Total length:		43:39

=== Notes ===
- ^{^[a]} signifies a co-producer
- ^{^[b]} signifies an additional producer
- Audio and More comprise audio tracks, while Visual and Live comprise video tracks.
- All tracks vocals produced by Beyoncé Knowles
- "Haunted" contains two parts – "Ghost" and "Haunted"; presented as one song on Audio, and two separate videos on Visual.
- "Blow" contains two parts – "Blow" and "Cherry"; presented as one song on Audio, and one video on Visual with two separate sections.
- "No Angel" is stylized as "~~Angel~~" on the back of physical editions.
- "Partition" contains two parts – "Yoncé" and "Partition"; presented as one song on Audio, and two separate videos on Visual.
- "Flawless" is stylized as "***Flawless"
- "Flawless" contains two parts – "Bow Down" and "Flawless". "Bow Down" was initially part of a previously recorded song entitled "Bow Down/I Been On".
- "Grown Woman" is presented after the credits on DVD, while it is presented before the credits in digital format.
- "Grown Woman" is written by Mosley, Kelly Sheehan, Knowles, Nash, Chris Godbey, Harmon, Darryl Pearson, and Garland Mosley. It is produced by Timbaland, with co-production by Harmon.

=== Sample credits ===
- "Partition" contains an interpolation of the French-dubbed version of the 1998 film The Big Lebowski, performed by Hajiba Fahmy.
- "Flawless" contains portions of the speech "We should all be feminists", written and delivered by Chimamanda Ngozi Adichie.
- "Heaven" contains portions of "The Lord's Prayer" in Spanish, performed by Melissa Vargas.
- "Flawless (Remix)" contains a sample of "SpottieOttieDopaliscious" by OutKast.
- "Drunk in Love (Remix)" contains a sample of Kanye West's "Flashing Lights", vocals provided by Connie Mitchell.
- "Ring Off" contains portions of a speech delivered by Tina Knowles at the 2014 Texas Women's Empowerment Foundation Leadership Luncheon.

== Personnel ==
Credits adapted from Beyoncé's official website.

Performers and musicians

- Beyoncé – lead vocals, background vocals
- Jay-Z – lead vocals (track 3)
- Drake – vocals (track 9)
- Chimamanda Ngozi Adichie – spoken word voices (track 11)
- Frank Ocean – lead vocals (track 12)
- Blue Ivy Carter – additional vocals (track 14)
- Boots – background vocals (tracks 2, 3, 7, 12), piano (track 14), drums (track 14), guitar (track 14), keyboards (track 14)
- Pharrell Williams – background vocals (track 4)
- Timbaland – background vocals (track 4)
- Justin Timberlake – background vocals (tracks 6, 8)
- Terius "The Dream" Nash – background vocals (tracks 6, 10), additional piano (track 10)
- Ryan Tedder – background vocals (track 10)
- Kelly Rowland – background vocals (track 12)
- Michelle Williams – background vocals (track 12)
- Sampha – additional vocals (track 11)
- Sia – background vocals, songwriter (track 1)
- Stefan Skarbek – background vocals (track 12)
- Kwane Wyatt – additional background vocals (track 2)
- Hajiba Fahmy – spoken word voices performed by (track 6)
- Melissa Vargas – "The Lord's Prayer" reciting (track 13)
- Katty Rodriguez – horns (track 4)
- Adison Evans – horns (track 4)
- Crystal Torres – horns (track 4)
- Mike Scott – guitar (track 8)
- Dwayne Wright – bass (track 8)
- Margot – violin played by, violin arrangement (tracks 12, 14)
- Steven Wolf – live drums (track 14)

Technical

- Beyoncé – executive production, music production (tracks 1–8, 10–11, 13–14), vocal production
- Ammo – music production (track 1)
- Boots – music production (tracks 2, 13–14), additional production (tracks 3, 5–7, 11–12), recording (tracks 2, 13, 14), instruments (tracks 2, 3, 7, 11, 13), additional arranging (track 11)
- Noel "Detail" Fisher – music production (tracks 3, 7)
- Pharrell Williams – production (tracks 4, 12)
- Caroline Polachek – music production (track 5), recording (track 5), synths and drum machine (track 5)
- Timbaland – music production (tracks 6, 8), additional production (track 3), co-production (track 4)
- Jerome Harmon – music production (track 6), additional production (track 3), co-production (tracks 4, 8)
- Justin Timberlake – music production (track 6), background vocals (tracks 6, 8)
- Key Wane – music production (track 6), intro keys and intro music programming (track 9)
- Noah "40" Shebib – music production (track 9), recording (track 9)
- Terius "The Dream" Nash – music production (track 10)
- Ryan Tedder – music production (track 10), recording (track 10), music programming and other instruments (track 10)
- Hit-Boy – music production (track 11), additional music production (tracks 7, 10), additional drum machine (track 2)
- Rey Reel – co-production (track 11)
- Brian Soko – additional production (track 3)
- Mike Dean – additional music production (track 6)
- Andre Proctor – additional music production (track 7)
- Majid Jordan – additional music production (track 9)
- Sidney "Omen" Brown – additional music production (track 9), additional drum machine (track 9)
- Stuart White – recording (all tracks), mixing (tracks 2, 3, 4, 6, 11, 13), digital editing and musical arrangement (tracks 4, 12), additional mixing (track 5), mix engineering (track 7)
- Chris Godbey – recording (tracks 4, 6, 8), mixing (track 8)
- Bart Schoudel – recording (tracks 4, 6)
- Andrew Coleman – recording (tracks 4, 12), digital editing and musical arrangement (tracks 4, 12)
- Ann Mincieli – recording (track 6)
- Noel Cadastre – recording (track 9)
- Jordan "DJ Swivel" Young – recording (track 11)
- James Krausse – recording (track 12), mix engineering (tracks 2, 3, 7, 11, 13), assistant mix engineering (track 4), assistant engineering (track 14), mastering (track 1)
- Mike Larson – recording (track 12)
- Elliot Scheiner – Surround sound mix (all tracks)
- Rob Cohen – recording (track 13)
- Jonathan Lee – recording (track 14)
- Ramon Rivas – second engineering (tracks 1, 2, 4–11, 13, 14), assistant engineering (tracks 3, 12)
- Rob Suchecki – second engineering (tracks 1, 7, 11)
- Hajiba Fahmy – spoken word voice recording (track 6)
- Derek Dixie – additional synth sounds (tracks 1, 3, 6), additional SFX (track 1), mix consultation (tracks 2–4, 6, 7, 11), horn arrangements (track 4)
- Niles Hollowell-Dhar – additional synth sounds (track 6)
- Tony Maserati – mixing (tracks 2, 3, 6, 7, 11–14)
- Andrew Scheps – mixing (tracks 5, 10)
- Noel "Gadget" Campbell – mixing (track 9)
- Justin Hergett – mix engineering (tracks 2, 4, 7, 11) assistant mix engineering (tracks 3, 5, 6, 12), assistant engineering (tracks 10, 13, 14)
- Tyler Scott – assistant mix engineering (track 2), assistant engineering (track 11)
- Matt Weber – assistant engineering (tracks 4, 6, 8, 12)
- Jon Castelli – assistant engineering (track 12)
- Christian Humphreys – assistant engineering (track 13)
- Paul Pavao – assistant mix engineering (track 4)
- Edward Valldejuli – assistant mix engineering (track 4)
- Chris Tabron – mix engineering (track 6), assistant mix engineering (track 12)
- Matt Wiggers – assistant mix engineering (track 6)
- Chris Cannon – assistant mix engineering (track 8)
- Carlos Perezdeanda – second engineering assistant (track 7)
- Tom Coyne – mastering (tracks 2–14)
- Aya Merrill – mastering (tracks 2–14)

== Charts ==
=== Weekly charts ===
Chart (2013–2016)	Peak position
Australian Albums (ARIA)	1
Australian Urban Albums (ARIA)	1
Austrian Albums (Ö3 Austria)	12
Belgian Albums (Ultratop Flanders)	4
Belgian Albums (Ultratop Wallonia)	9
Brazilian Albums (Billboard)	3
Canadian Albums (Billboard)	1
Chinese Albums (Sino)	7
Croatian International Albums (HDU)	1
Czech Albums (ČNS IFPI)	5
Danish Albums (Hitlisten)	2
Dutch Albums (Album Top 100)	1
Finnish Albums (Suomen virallinen lista)	5
French Albums (SNEP)	13
German Albums (Offizielle Top 100)	11
Greek Albums (IFPI)	12
Hungarian Albums (MAHASZ)	26
Irish Albums (IRMA)	2
Italian Albums (FIMI)	14
Japanese Albums (Oricon)	11
New Zealand Albums (RMNZ)	2
Norwegian Albums (VG-lista)	2
Polish Albums (ZPAV)	1
Portuguese Albums (AFP)	3
Scottish Albums (Official Charts)	2
Slovenian Albums (Slo Top 30)	5
South African Albums (RiSA)	3
South Korean Albums (Circle)	10
South Korean International Albums (Circle)	2
Spanish Albums (Promusicae)	8
Swedish Albums (Sverigetopplistan)	16
Swiss Albums (Schweizer Hitparade)	4
Taiwan International Albums (G-Music)	2
UK Albums (Official Charts)	2
UK R&B Albums (Official Charts)	1
US Billboard 200	1
US Top R&B/Hip-Hop Albums (Billboard)	1

More Only

Chart (2014)	Peak position
Belgian Albums (Ultratop Flanders)	69
Belgian Albums (Ultratop Wallonia)	123
New Zealand Albums (RMNZ)	24
Scottish Albums (Official Charts)	38
UK Albums (Official Charts)	41
UK R&B Albums (Official Charts)	5
US Billboard 200	8
US Top R&B/Hip-Hop Albums (Billboard)	3

=== Year-end charts ===
Chart (2013)	Position
Australian Albums (ARIA)	23
Australian Hip-Hop/R&B Albums (ARIA)	3
Belgian Albums (Ultratop Flanders)	180
Brazilian Albums (ABPD)	7
Danish Albums (Hitlisten)	38
Dutch Albums (Album Top 100)	39
French Albums (SNEP)	122
New Zealand Albums (RMNZ)	28
South Korean International Albums (Circle)	29
UK Albums (Official Charts)	41
Worldwide (IFPI)	10

Chart (2014)	Position
Australian Albums (ARIA)	27
Australian Hip-Hop/R&B Albums (ARIA)	3
Belgian Albums (Ultratop Flanders)	17
Belgian Albums (Ultratop Wallonia)	41
Brazilian Albums (ABPD)	11
Canadian Albums (Billboard)	7
Danish Albums (Hitlisten)	78
Dutch Albums (Album Top 100)	15
French Albums (SNEP)	93
Italian Albums (FIMI)	93
New Zealand Albums (RMNZ)	16
Polish Albums (ZPAV)	49
Swiss Albums (Schweizer Hitparade)	29
UK Albums (Official Charts)	24
US Billboard 200	2
US Digital Albums (Billboard)	2
US Top R&B/Hip-Hop Albums (Billboard)	1

Chart (2015)	Position
Australian Hip-Hop/R&B Albums (ARIA)	15
Belgian Albums (Ultratop Flanders)	184
Danish Albums (Hitlisten)	64
Swedish Albums (Sverigetopplistan)	51
US Billboard 200	57
US Top R&B/Hip-Hop Albums (Billboard)	24

Chart (2016)	Position
Australian Hip-Hop/R&B Albums (ARIA)	36
Danish Albums (Hitlisten)	93
Dutch Albums (Album Top 100)	73
Polish Albums (ZPAV)	69
Polish International Albums (ZPAV)	20
Swedish Albums (Sverigetopplistan)	83
US Billboard 200	97

Chart (2017)	Position
Australian Hip-Hop/R&B Albums (ARIA)	51
US Billboard 200	197
US R&B Albums (Billboard)	21

Chart (2018)	Position
Australian Hip-Hop/R&B Albums (ARIA)	60

Chart (2019)	Position
Australian Hip-Hop/R&B Albums (ARIA)	73

More Only

Chart (2015)	Position
US Top R&B/Hip-Hop Albums (Billboard)	65

=== Decade-end charts ===
2010s decade-end charts for Beyoncé
Chart (2010–2019)	Position
Dutch Albums (Album Top 100)	73
US Billboard 200	65

=== All-time charts ===
Chart	Position
US Female Albums (Billboard)	97

== Certifications ==
Certifications and sales for Beyoncé
Region	Certification	Certified units/sales
Australia (ARIA)	2× Platinum	140,000^{‡}
Brazil (Pro-Música Brasil)	Diamond	160,000^{‡}
Canada (Music Canada)	3× Platinum	240,000^{‡}
Denmark (IFPI Danmark)	Platinum	20,000^{‡}
France (SNEP)	Gold	50,000^{*}
Germany (BVMI)	Gold	100,000^{‡}
Ireland (IRMA)	Gold	7,500^{^}
Italy (FIMI)	Gold	25,000^{‡}
Mexico (AMPROFON)	Gold	30,000^{‡}
New Zealand (RMNZ)	4× Platinum	60,000^{‡}
Poland (ZPAV)	3× Platinum	60,000^{‡}
Spain (Promusicae)	Gold	20,000^{‡}
Sweden (GLF)	2× Platinum	80,000^{‡}
Switzerland (IFPI Switzerland)	Gold	10,000^{^}
United Kingdom (BPI)	2× Platinum	600,000^{‡}
United States (RIAA)	6× Platinum	6,000,000^{‡}
^{*} Sales figures based on certification alone.^{^} Shipments figures based on certification alone.^{‡} Sales+streaming figures based on certification alone.

== Release history ==
Release dates and formats
Initial release date	Format	Edition	Ref.
December 13, 2013	Digital download (iTunes Store-exclusive)	Standard	
December 20, 2013	CD and DVD; digital download (all retailers)	Standard	
November 24, 2014	CD and DVD; digital download; streaming	Platinum Edition	

== See also ==
- List of Billboard 200 number-one albums of 2013
- List of Billboard 200 number-one albums of 2014
- List of Billboard number-one R&B albums of 2013
- List of Billboard number-one R&B albums of 2014
- List of number-one albums of 2013 (Canada)
- List of number-one albums of 2014 (Canada)
- List of number-one albums of 2014 (Australia)
- List of UK R&B Chart number-one albums of 2013
- List of UK R&B Chart number-one albums of 2014
