= Standing on the Sun =

"Standing on the Sun" (remix)
- Sleeve cover

Song by Beyoncé featuring Mr. Vegas

from the album Beyonce: Platinum Edition
- Released: November 24, 2014
- Recorded: 2013
- Studio: Kings Landing (Bridgehampton, New York)
- Genre: Pop; dancehall; tropical
- Length: 4:33 (remix version)
- Label: Parkwood; Columbia
- Songwriters: Sia Furler; Greg Kurstin; Beyoncé; Noel Fisher; Brian Soko; Rasool Diaz; Andre Eric Proctor
- Producers: Greg Kurstin; Beyoncé; Pharrell Williams

"Standing on the Sun" is a song recorded by American singer Beyoncé, featuring Australian singer Sia and was chosen as the promotional single for a Beyoncé x H&M curated swimwear collection in 2013. The song went up on iTunes illegally (Link To the Image of the Track on iTunes in 2013) at midnight after Beyoncé first performed the song on 31 May 2013, at the Sportpaleis in Antwerp, Belgium, during the The Mrs. Carter Show World Tour. The released recording featuring Jamaican dancehall artist Mr. Vegas is a remix of the song originally written and recorded for potential inclusion on her 2013 surprise eponymous album, and instead appears on the 2014 Beyonce: Platinum Edition re-package. It was described by music publication Stereogum as a "sweeping, satisfying pop song with a slight dancehall undercurrent." Upon release, the remix debuted and peaked at number 45 on the Billboard Hot R&B/Hip-Hop Songs Chart.

== Background and composition ==
“Standing on the Sun” was written by Knowles, Sia Furler, and Greg Kurstin for reported inclusion onto what became her 2013 eponymous fifth album. The “sun” of the track's title is alluded to be the heat between two people. When Knowles was announced as the spokeswoman of the new 2013 H&M summer swimwear campaign, the song was teased as a new promotional single in a similar manner to "Grown Woman", a single connected to her earlier 2013 Pepsi campaign. Upon release of the campaign, the original version of the single was lauded as having "number one hit single written all over it" by British radio station Capital Xtra and "an empowering anthem... celebrat[ing] female strength and beauty."

Several unofficial versions appeared on various music streaming services at the conclusion of the campaign, before a full leak of the original version was reported by Rolling Stone and several other music publications in June 2013.

On November 4, 2014, a special box-set repackaged edition of Beyoncé's fifth album was announced, including a remix of "Standing on the Sun" featuring Jamaican dancehall artist Mr. Vegas. The remixed version is credited to original collaborators Knowles, Furler, and Kurstin alongside "Drunk in Love" co-writers Noel Fisher, Andre Eric Proctor, Rasool Diaz, and Brian Soko, Mr. Vegas, "Blow" producer Pharrell Williams, and 80s Jamaican reggae producers Cleveland Browne & Danny Browne.

== Reception ==
The remix was met with mixed reception, receiving praise for its "summery" sound, acknowledgement that it would not properly fit on the 2013 original track-listing of the album, and slight disappointment for the release of what many publications considered a "diluted" version of the original. Laurie Tuffrey of The Quietus highlighted the song's "808 trills over tropicalia pop" in comparison to the full-Trap record "Bow Down" released several weeks earlier. Alex Kritselis of Bustle called the remix a "triumph", but also opined that the "remix isn't quite as good as the original version." Moises Mendez II of Rolling Stone gave a more nuanced review based on the "darkness" of the original project: He considered the song "breezy... [with a] fun, tropical element", but understood that the "inclu[sion of] something so light on the original version of such a groundbreaking album... might have felt a little out of place", ranking the remix number 70 on the publication's "Beyonce's 70 Best Songs of All-Time" List.

== Visual ==
90 seconds of the original version were utilized for the H&M campaign commercial in April 2013, directed by noted Swedish music video director Jonas Akurlund, whom Knowles had previously worked with on Lady Gaga collaboration "Telephone", and would direct subsequent visuals for "Haunted" and "Superpower" later in 2013. Reportedly an homage to the fusion of the four elements (fire, water, wind and earth), the video was shot "on a glistening beach" in Nassau, Bahamas. Vanity Fair described the visual as an "affordably outfitted, tribal tiki dance party."

== Live performance ==
Beyoncé performed the song for the first time on May 31, 2013, at her Mrs. Carter Show World Tour concert in Antwerp, Belgium. The song was debuted as a "special" surprise for the fans, as the show was rescheduled from the originally-planned May 14 date due to dehydration and exhaustion.

== Personnel ==
- Beyoncé Giselle Knowles-Carter – producer, composer, lyricist, lead vocals, background vocals, vocal producer, performer
- Greg Kurstin – producer, composer, lyricist, bass, keyboards, programmer, recording engineer
- Sia Furler – composer, lyricist, background vocals
- Clifford Smith – performer, background vocals, remixer
- Noel Fisher – composer, lyricist
- Andre Eric Proctor – composer, lyricist
- Rasool Diaz – composer, lyricist
- Brian Soko – composer, lyricist
- Pharrell Williams – producer
- Stuart White – recording engineer
- Tom Coyne – mastering engineer
- Aya Merrill – mastering engineer
- Ramon Rivas – assistant engineer
- Rob Suchecki – assistant engineer
- Alex Pasco – assistant engineer
- Chris Tabron – mixing engineer
- Cleveland Browne – performer, remixer
- Danny Browne – performer, remixer

== Charts ==
Weekly chart performance for "Standing on the Sun (Remix)"
Chart (2014)	Peak position
France (SNEP)	150
UK Singles Chart (OCC)	170
UK Hip-Hop and R&B (OCC)	23
US Hot R&B/Hip-Hop Songs (Billboard)	45

== Release history ==
"Standing on the Sun" release history
Region	Date	Format(s)	Version	Label(s)	Ref.
Various	July 29, 2013	Digital download; streaming	Tiësto remix	Self-released	
Various	November 24, 2014	Digital download; streaming	Remix version	Parkwood; Columbia	
