= Ring Off (song) =

Single by Beyoncé

from the album Beyoncé: Platinum Edition
- Released: November 28, 2014
- Studio: Le Royal Monceau (Paris, France); Mike's house (Los Angeles, CA); The Carlyle (Los Angeles, CA); Record Plant (Los Angeles, CA)
- Genre: Dancehall; reggae; R&B
- Length: 3:00
- Label: Parkwood; Columbia
- Composers: Mike Caren; William Lobban-Bean; Adam Amezaga; Derek Dixie; Stephen Bishop; Chauncey "Hit-Boy" Hollis; Mike Dean; Sidney Swift
- Lyricists: Beyoncé Knowles; Geoff Early; Charles Hinshaw
- Producers: Knowles; Caren

Beyoncé singles chronology
"7/11" (2014)	"Ring Off" (2014)	"Crazy in Love (Remix)" (2015)

Audio video
- "Ring Off" on YouTube

"Ring Off" is a song by American singer Beyoncé, taken from the reissue of her fifth studio album Beyoncé (2013), subtitled Platinum Edition (2014). The song was released on November 28, 2014, to contemporary hit radio in Italy and urban adult contemporary in the United States as the second single from the reissue. A midtempo reggae-tinged ballad which is built around a slight dancehall rhythm and dubstep-influenced beats, "Ring Off" addresses the end of a marriage between Beyoncé's parents. It was written in a form of open letter of encouragement for her mother Tina Knowles.

Upon the release of the Platinum Edition, "Ring Off" received mostly favorable reviews from music critics, who deemed it one of the most personal songs ever released by Beyoncé. Commercially, the single appeared on a few charts, including the US Bubbling Under Hot 100, where it peaked at number 5. It also charted in several European countries including France, the Netherlands and the United Kingdom.

== Background ==
On November 4, 2014, it was announced through a press release by Parkwood Entertainment that Beyoncé would release a platinum edition of her self-titled fifth studio album on November 24, 2014; the "More" disc of the album includes two new songs titled "7/11" and "Ring Off". On November 19, 2014, 30-second snippets of the two songs appeared online along with reports that "7/11" would impact radio stations on November 25. The following day, the full versions of both songs surfaced on the Internet. "Ring Off" was released on November 28, 2014, to Italian contemporary hit radio, alongside "7/11". "Ring Off" also impacted urban adult contemporary radio in the United States.

== Composition ==
"Ring Off" (2014)
An 18-second sample of "Ring Off" by Beyoncé, where the chorus is heard.

"Ring Off" was written by Beyoncé, Mike Caren, William Lobban-Bean, Geoff Early, Charles Hinshaw, Adam Amezaga, Dixie, Chauncey Hollis, Mike Dean, and Sidney Swift. It contains a sample of "On And On" written by Stephen Bishop. It is a midtempo ballad which runs at a duration of three minutes. It was described as a reggae-tinged track by Gerrick Kennedy from the Los Angeles Times. Meanwhile, the New York Post's Hardeep Phull opined that the song was built around a slight dancehall rhythm. Additionally, Allan Raible writing for ABC News noted the slightly dubstep-influenced beats on "Ring Off".

Lyrically, the song addresses the end of a marriage between Beyoncé's parents Tina Knowles and Mathew Knowles. The lyrics are written in a form of an "open letter" in which the singer praises her mother's courage for ending a dysfunctional marriage. At the beginning of the song, Beyoncé sings, "Mama, I understand your many sleepless nights / When you think about father / and how you tried to be the perfect wife... I wish you didn’t hurt at all." Alex Frank of Vogue noted how the song was thematically "an enlightened follow-up" to "Single Ladies", discussing a similar private subject matter for the singer. He further opined that the lyrics apply to other women who are part of toxic relationships.

The last part of "Ring Off" contains lyrics in which Beyoncé declares to her mother that "it's your time to put your love on top", encouraging her "to put herself and her own happiness first"; these lyrics were noted to be a "witty" rework of the singer's own song "Love on Top" (2011). The song ends with portions of a speech delivered by Tina Knowles from the 2014 Texas Women's Empowerment Foundation Leadership Luncheon.

== Reception ==
=== Critical reception ===
Jim Farber from New York Daily News wrote that "Ring Off" is "very much worth downloading." Robert Christgau named the track a "sisterly, daughterly" song. ABC News' Allan Raible wrote that "Ring Off" was "the counterpoint" to Beyoncé's previous song "Single Ladies (Put a Ring on It)" (2008): "While that song is about settling down, this is an ode to 'starting over again.'" On behalf of USA Today, Patrick Ryan labelled the track as a hybrid of "anthemic" sound of "XO" and "Caribbean vibes" of "Standing on the Sun" and "Grown Woman". Lindsay Zoladz, a reviewer from Vulture, said that "Ring Off" "isn’t anything special" musically and likened the song's style to that of Beyoncé's previous songs "Schoolin' Life" (2011) and "XO" (2013). However, Zoladz complimented on the song's lyrics, calling it "one of the most candidly personal songs Beyoncé’s ever released." Vogue editor Alex Frank praised "Ring Off" for being an "epically good track, but more importantly, one of the most personal, profound songs she has ever released". Daniel D'Addario from Time magazine praised "Ring Off" as a "big step forward" in the singer's music career, noting that it amplified the album's theme with "an examination of the circumstances under which it’s better to be alone". In 2014, the song was placed at number 537 on the annual Pazz & Jop poll compiled by The Village Voice.

=== Chart performance ===
"Ring Off" appeared on the French SNEP Singles Chart at number 110 on December 6, 2014, and remained for one week. In the Netherlands, the single debuted at number 84 on the Single Top 100 chart on December 6, 2014. The following week, it dropped to number 93. The song also peaked at number 5 on the US Bubbling Under Hot 100 chart, a chart which acts as a 25-song extension to the Billboard Hot 100. It had a better performance on the US Hot R&B/Hip-Hop Songs chart where it peaked at number 31. In the United Kingdom, "Ring Off" debuted at number 81 on the UK Singles Chart in the chart issue dated December 6, 2014; this placement also became its peak position in that country.

== Credits and personnel ==
Credits are adapted from the singer's official website and the album's liner notes.

Song credits

- Writing — Beyoncé Knowles, Mike Caren, William Lobban-Bean, Geoff Early, Charles Hinshaw, Adam Amezaga, Derek Dixie, Stephen Bishop, Chauncey Hollis, Mike Dean, Sidney Swift
- Production — Caren, Knowles
- Additional production — Hit-Boy, Hazebanga, Preach Bal4, Mike Dean
- Vocals production — Knowles
- Recording — Caren; Mike's House and Cook Classics at the Caryle, Los Angeles
- Second engineering — Ramon Rivas, John Schacter
- Audio mixing — Tony Maserati, Stuart White, Mirrorbal Studios, North Hollywood and Le Royal Monceau, Paris
- Mix engineering — James Krause, Justin Hergett
- Mix consulting — Derek Dixie
- Mastering — Dave Kutch, The Mastering Palace, New York City

== Weekly charts ==
Chart (2014)	Peak position
France (SNEP)	110
Netherlands (Dutch Top 40 Tipparade)	2
Netherlands (Single Top 100)	84
UK Singles (Official Charts)	81
UK Hip Hop/R&B (Official Charts)	10
US Bubbling Under Hot 100 (Billboard)	5
US Hot R&B/Hip-Hop Songs (Billboard)	31
