= 7/11 (song) =

2014 single by Beyoncé

Single by Beyoncé

from the album Beyoncé: Platinum Edition
- Released: November 25, 2014
- Recorded: 2013
- Studio: Oven (New York); Record Plant (Los Angeles)
- Genre: Hip-hop; trap
- Length: 3:33
- Label: Parkwood; Columbia
- Songwriters: Beyoncé Knowles; Noel Fisher; Bobby Johnson
- Producers: Beyoncé; Bobby Johnson; Detail; Sidney Swift

Beyoncé singles chronology
"Flawless (Remix)" (2014)	"7/11" (2014)	"Ring Off" (2014)

Music video
- "7/11" on YouTube

"7/11" is a song recorded by American singer Beyoncé, released on November 25, 2014, by Columbia Records as the second single from the reissue of her fifth studio album Beyoncé (2013), subtitled Platinum Edition (2014). Written by Beyoncé, Bobby Johnson, and Noel Fisher, "7/11" is a trap song containing elements of Hip-hop, in which Beyoncé rap-sings vocals over a warped up-tempo beat.

Upon its release, "7/11" received mixed reviews by music critics, with some praising its sound and others criticizing its use of auto-tune. Its accompanying music video, which premiered through YouTube on November 21, 2014, was praised by critics for its personal, relaxed and fun nature; critics deemed it a departure from Beyoncé's other high-budget videos on the album's visual. "7/11" peaked at number 13 on the U.S. Billboard Hot 100. Among component charts, "7/11" earned Beyoncé her eighth number one on the Hot R&B/Hip-Hop chart and her 22nd number one on the Hot Dance Club Songs chart.

== Background ==
On November 5, 2014, it was announced through a press release by Parkwood Entertainment that Beyoncé would release a platinum edition of her self-titled fifth studio album on November 24, 2014. The Platinum Edition contains a disc titled Beyoncé: More which would include two new songs titled "7/11" and "Ring Off". On November 19, 2014, 30-second snippets of the two songs appeared online along with reports that "7/11" would impact radio stations on November 25. The following day, the full versions of both songs surfaced on the Internet. "7/11" was sent to urban contemporary radio stations in the United States on November 25, 2014, and contemporary hit radio in Italy on November 28, 2014.

"7/11" was written by Beyoncé, Bobby Johnson and Detail, and produced by the trio along with Sidney Swift. Beyoncé further served as the song's vocal producer, while the co-production was finished by Detail and Sidney Swift. It was recorded with guidance by Stuart White at two studios – Record Plant in Los Angeles and Le Royal Monceau in Paris. Ramon Rivas and Jon Schacter served as the assistants of the track's audio engineering while Tony Maserati and Stuart White were responsible for its mixing. The mastering was finished by Dave Kutch at The Mastering Palace in New York City. A remix of "7/11" by Diplo and Skrillex was released.

== Composition ==
"7/11" (2014)
A 21-second sample of "7/11", a trap and hip hop song.

"7/11" is an up-tempo hip hop track complete with Auto-Tune. Its production consists of trap, and R&B elements accompanied by a "rattling" bassline. Caitlin White from MTV News noted that it was "all beats and bragging" with Beyoncé's vocals seldom transferring into her singing voice. Gerrick D. Kennedy from Los Angeles Times likened the singer's rap-singing in a warbly double-time cadence to her early work with the girl group Destiny's Child. "7/11" was also noted for containing Southern rap "swagger." Her vocal performance was further noted for being filled with "intensity" while singing the staccato rap verses. Allison Piwowarski opined that the song's title refers to the drinking game "Sevens, Elevens, and Doubles", as the singer hints in lines like "... I'm thinkin' bout that alcohol / Man it feel like rolling dice / seven eleven ... ."

Beyoncé raps commanding and demanding lines throughout accompanied by a "warped" beat, shouting the lyrics: "Smack that, clap that...like you don't care! [sic]". The singer goes on repetitively describing her dance moves with the lyrics "I put up my hands up, spinning while my hands up... Legs movin' side to side, smack in the air." She uses braggadocio while boasting about "flexin' with my hands up". After two and a half minutes, the songs "breakneck" pace changes into an "atmospheric" outro for the last 60 seconds.

== Critical reception ==
Critics responded to "7/11" with mixed reviews. Katie Hasty from the website HitFix criticized "7/11" as a "club throwaway [which] isn't likely to move you, even physically"; she went on to compare it with "Mad Libs for people who get bottle service."

A positive review from Erika Ramirez of Billboard magazine imagined that "7/11" would "spark a dance craze". Colin Stutz from the same publication described it as a "swaggering number". Writing for Fuse, Jeff Benjamin concluded that it was apparent from the song's "hard-hitting, trappy production" that Beyoncé "hasn't lost her edge in between recording sessions". Daniel Kreps from Rolling Stone deemed the song as a "rapid-fire banger" and "frenetic". Joey Guerra of the Houston Chronicle described it as an "irresistible club banger" which "is going to pack dance floors and inspire plenty of moves". Upon hearing a 30-second snippet of "7/11", Nate Jones from Vulture concluded that it was "harder than anything on the original album" with Beyoncé bragging and showing various "assorted signs of self-confidence". Spin's Brennan Carley commented that the song was "warbly rapped" and less interesting than "Ring Off". Caitlin White observed in her review for MTV News that "7/11" headed further than the direction the singer aimed in songs like "Drunk in Love", "Partition" and "Flawless". She added that considering its writers and producers, "[It is] no wonder the track is a veering, experimental club anthem more reminiscent of the initial version of 'Flawless'—'Bow Down/I Been On'."

Justin Davis of Complex magazine positively reviewed the "catchy" song with an "easily repeatable" chorus as a worthy addition to the album's original track list, further adding that it "is sure to be a staple in the clubs". Patrick Ryan of USA Today characterized the refrain as "instantly recognizable". Robin Murray in a review for Clash magazine found an "impeccable" pop production in the song and described it as Beyoncé at her best. Consequence of Sound's Michelle Geslani described "7/11" as "quite the banger", concluding, "If you thought the self-titled LP flaunted unflinching assertiveness, consider this track Beyoncé taken to the next level." Exclaim! editor Josiah Hughes deemed it a "certified banger" filled with heavy trap drums and half-rapped vocals. Gerrick D. Kennedy of Los Angeles Times described the track as "nonsensical fun for the club or treadmill". Kate Hutchinson of The Guardian called "7/11" a "tropi-bomb". In 2014, the song was placed at number 113 on the annual Pazz & Jop poll compiled by The Village Voice.

== Chart performance ==
In the United States, the single debuted at number 18 on the Billboard Hot 100 and peaked at number 13. It debuted at number 3 on the Hot R&B/Hip-Hop Songs following its first week of availability as a digital download from the Platinum Edition reissue, having sold 85,000 copies that week. The debut position on the former chart marked the second highest entrance for the singer on the chart after "Drunk in Love" which premiered at number 12. "7/11" later reached number one on the chart. The song also topped Billboard's Hot Dance Club Songs, becoming the singer's twenty-second number one song on the chart, tying her with Rihanna for second most number ones on the chart, only behind Madonna with 46. In the United States, "7/11" debuted at the top on the R&B/Hip-Hop Digital Songs chart, becoming her first number one on the chart. On August 8, 2022, the Recording Industry Association of America certified the single 4× platinum for sales and streams of 4,000,000 units in the United States.

In the United Kingdom, it debuted at numbers 36 and 2 on the UK Singles Chart and the UK R&B Chart respectively on December 6, 2014. The single debuted at number 11 on the French Singles Chart on December 6, 2014. "7/11" peaked at number nine in Hungary, and 18 in Slovakia.

== Music video ==
On November 21, 2014, a music video for the song was released on Beyoncé's official YouTube account. The clip was shot in the style of a home-made visual with the singer dancing at various locations around the Beverly Presidential Suite at the Beverly Wilshire Hotel in Los Angeles, including: the patio, balcony, bedroom, and a bathroom. It starts with Beyoncé dancing on a balcony dressed with a sweatshirt with the word "Kale", with dance moves that resembles clock hands and a tribal war dance with leopard print panties and knee pads; from there it proceeds to a hotel suite. Beyoncé is joined by five female dancers throughout the video. Other scenes show her rolling dice on her dancer's buttock and blowing her hair with a dryer. She is also seen getting out of a present box in front of a Christmas tree and dialing a phone number on her foot. The clip finishes with Beyoncé blowing a New Year whistle while wearing glasses shaped in the form of the number 2015. Throughout the whole video, the singer is seen passing through quick cuts and wardrobe changes. The scenes shot at the balcony were filmed using a fisheye camera. Beyoncé's daughter Blue Ivy Carter also makes a cameo appearance.

=== Reception ===
Jeff Benjamin of Fuse found the singer looking "adorably cute" in the clip. Colin Stutz of Billboard deemed it "awesome" and felt that the singer had "hilariously fun time" in it. Pitchfork writer Molly Beauchemin commented that the video gets more interesting from the beginning. Stereogum journalist James Rettig also felt that the "really effective" low-key video "gets progressively crazier". and A writer from Rap-Up summarized the visual as "fun and playful" and full with surprises. Patrick Ryan writing for USA Today likened the song's music video to "Flawless" in terms of the similar potential to become a "viral sensation" due to its club dancing moves "that have since ignited Tumblr with GIFs". Spin's Andrew Unterberger was critical of the song, but noted that its fun and fast-paced video could be enough to keep it as an essential part of the singer's discography and predicted it would end up "be[ing] a thing". Frances Perraudin felt that the video looked as if it was shot with an iPhone which, according to him rendered it a "music video for the selfie generation".

Lindsay Zoladz from Vulture similarly felt that the track seemed like "a bit of a throwaway" until the release of its clip. She emphasized how its video was in line with the overall aim of the album Beyoncé to disassemble the idea of the singer being a perfectionist, but somehow assert she is "a little bit fresher than you". Zoladz concluded her review by summarizing the clip as "aspirational chilling, carefully curated fun, a GoPro feminist utopia... a glorious ode to goofing off with your ladies". Sharan Shetty of Slate viewed the clip as "unusually candid" and "delightfully low-concept" further noticing how despite the acrobatic moves and synchronized twerking, the singer also "injects some dorkiness into her 'woke up like this' image". He described it as the singer's routine on a Friday night and further praised Jay-Z and Blue Ivy's appearances. Justin Block of Complex praised the fact that most of the dance moves were not coordinated enough, further praising Beyoncé for using an "ubiquitous 'selfie-stick' to bring more private moments of her life into the fold". Joey Guerra from the Houston Chronicle felt that the video was not "groundbreaking in any level" but noted it was intentionally not supposed to be.

Daniel Kreps from Rolling Stone felt that unlike the rest of the music videos found on the album Beyoncé, which seemed like Hollywood production, the clip for "7/11" was "refreshing" and "successfully operate[d] on a low budget". Kreps finished his review calling the "well-shot, spryly edited" video one of the more personal in the singer's career. Caitlin White of MTV News somehow echoed his opinion writing that the intimate clip showed a new side of the singer and contrasted its "carefree, casual vibes" with the rest of the album's choreographed videos. Dose editor Barbara Pavone deemed the personal video "a breath of fresh air" when compared to Beyoncé's other high budget videos and went on to praise her humor, wardrobe and look. Emily Blake writing on behalf of Entertainment Weekly pointed out that "7/11" was not "glossy" as the rest of Beyoncé but was "just as fun to watch" by being "playful and casual". She further commented how it looked as if it was filmed in a single afternoon. Idolator's Mike Wass called "7/11" a "mockery" of the singer's big budget videos and went on to highlight the "insane" dance moves throughout.

=== Recognition and accolades ===
The video was included on Pitchfork's list of "The 20 Best Music Videos of 2014" with Molly Beauchemin writing that "Beyoncé brings together a host of modern obsessions: GoPros, twerking, kale. Even though the clip is edited to a T, it gives us a glimpse into Bey's life offstage: a hopeless perfectionist goofing off at her leisure." The video won in the category for Video of the Year at the 2015 BET Awards.

== Credits ==
Credits are adapted from Beyoncé's website and the album's liner notes.

- Writing – Bobby Johnson, Detail, Beyoncé Knowles
- Production – Bobby Johnson, Knowles
- Co-production – Fisher, Sidney Swift
- Vocals production – Knowles
- Additional production and arranging – Derek Dixie
- Additional choreography – Gabriel Valenciano
- Recording – Stuart White; Record Plant, Los Angeles and Le Royal Monceau, Paris
- Assistant engineering – Ramon Rivas, Jon Schacter
- Audio mixing – Tony Maserati, Stuart White; Mirrorbal Studios, North Hollywood
- Assistant mixing – James Krause, Tyler Scott
- Mix consulting – Derek Dixie
- Audio mastering – Dave Kutch; The Mastering Palace, New York City

== Charts ==
=== Weekly charts ===
Weekly chart performance
Chart (2014–2015)	Peak position
Australia (ARIA)	41
Belgium (Ultratip Bubbling Under Flanders)	1
Belgium (Ultratip Bubbling Under Wallonia)	9
Canada Hot 100 (Billboard)	27
CIS Airplay (TopHit)	156
Czech Republic Airplay (ČNS IFPI)	21
Finland Airplay (Radiosoittolista)	96
France (SNEP)	11
Germany (GfK)	78
Hungary (Single Top 40)	9
Hungary (Stream Top 40)	16
Ireland (IRMA)	44
Italy (FIMI)	96
Netherlands (Single Top 100)	43
New Zealand (Recorded Music NZ)	24
Scottish Singles Sales (Official Charts)	30
Slovakia Airplay (ČNS IFPI)	18
Spain (Promusicae)	85
Suriname (Nationale Top 40)	8
Sweden (Sverigetopplistan)	45
Switzerland (Schweizer Hitparade)	74
UK Singles (Official Charts)	33
UK Hip Hop/R&B (Official Charts)	2
US Billboard Hot 100	13
US Hot R&B/Hip-Hop Songs (Billboard)	1
US R&B/Hip-Hop Airplay (Billboard)	1
US Dance Club Songs (Billboard)	1
US Rhythmic Airplay (Billboard)	7

=== Year-end charts ===
Annual chart rankings
Chart (2015)	Position
Belgium (Ultratop Flanders Urban)	47
US Billboard Hot 100	61
US Billboard Dance Club Songs	10
US Billboard R&B Songs	9
US Billboard Rhythmic Songs	37

== Certifications ==
Certifications for "7/11"
Region	Certification	Certified units/sales
Australia (ARIA)	3× Platinum	210,000^{‡}
Brazil (Pro-Música Brasil)	Diamond	250,000^{‡}
Canada (Music Canada)	2× Platinum	160,000^{‡}
Denmark (IFPI Danmark)	Gold	30,000^{^}
Germany (BVMI)	Gold	200,000^{‡}
Italy (FIMI)	Gold	25,000^{‡}
New Zealand (RMNZ)	2× Platinum	60,000^{‡}
Norway (IFPI Norway)	Gold	30,000^{‡}
Portugal (AFP)	Gold	10,000^{‡}
United Kingdom (BPI)	Platinum	600,000^{‡}
United States (RIAA)	4× Platinum	4,000,000^{‡}
^{^} Shipments figures based on certification alone.^{‡} Sales+streaming figures based on certification alone.

== Release history ==
Release dates and formats for "7/11"
Region	Date	Format	Label	Ref.
United States	November 25, 2014	Urban contemporary radio	Columbia	
Italy	November 28, 2014	Radio airplay	Sony	

== See also ==
- List of number-one R&B/hip-hop songs of 2014 (U.S.)
- List of Billboard Dance Club Songs number ones of 2015
