= Sweet Jamaica =

Studio album by Mr. Vegas
- Released: May 29, 2012
- Genres: Reggae; dancehall
- Length: 1:49:00
- Label: Mr. Vegas Music/VPAL
- Producer: Mikey Bennett

Sweet Jamaica is a studio album by a Jamaican reggae singer, Mr. Vegas, released on May 29, 2012, under Mr. Vegas Music/VPAL.

This album was released to celebrate the 50th anniversary of reggae music and of Jamaican independence. In an interview with the Miami New Times, Mr. Vegas says "Mikey Bennett had approached me about going in a different lane. He could hear my sound fitting songs like Toots and the Maytals' "Sweet and Dandy" and Hopetown Lewis' "Take It Easy". We started recording, and it just felt like the type of music that helped set the foundation of Jamaican music. At the same time it is our 50th anniversary of reggae music and our 50th anniversary of independence this year."

This album consists of two discs. The 15-song first disc focuses on reggae music and features cover versions of classic reggae songs, produced by Mikey Bennett. The 16-song second disc focuses on dancehall music. Guest spots include Shaggy, Luciano, Josey Wales, Nadine Sutherland, Dean Fraser and Jovi Rockwell. This album includes his hit song "Bruk It Down". The album reached number 7 on the Billboard Reggae Albums chart.

== Track listing ==
=== CD1 ===
No.	Title	Artist(s)	Length
1.	"A little Love (That’s All I Want from You)"		3:59
2.	"You’ve Made Me So Very Happy"		4:10
3.	"Alive & Will"	Mr. Vegas feat. Luciano	3:28
4.	"Things Ruff"		3:48
5.	"Sweet Jamaica"	Mr. Vegas feat. Shaggy & Josey Wales	3:12
6.	"Gimme a Light"		3:26
7.	"Take It Easy"		3:30
8.	"Roses in My Garden"		3:26
9.	"Magical"	Mr. Vegas feat. Nadine Sutherland	4:44
10.	"Whenever You’re Lonely"		3:41
11.	"Can’t Stop (Love You More Everyday)"	Mr. Vegas feat. Jovi Rockwell	3:40
12.	"Say Yuh Bad (Johnny You Too Bad)"		3:40
13.	"Sweet and Dandy"		3:27
14.	"Ob-La-Di Ob-La-Da"		3:16
15.	"Above the Water"		4:14

=== CD2 ===
No.	Title	Length
1.	"Beautiful Life"	3:15
2.	"Champagne Rose"	2:43
3.	"Certain Law"	3:17
4.	"Let the Music Play"	4:01
5.	"Bruk It Down"	2:52
6.	"Dancehall Queen"	3:28
7.	"Party Tun Up"	2:43
8.	"Whine for Me Baby"	3:22
9.	"Call Me"	3:08
10.	"Something About You"	3:11
11.	"Talk Is Cheap"	3:42
12.	"Black & Proud"	3:01
13.	"Honey Girl"	2:58
14.	"Get Ready (Hmmm)"	3:58
15.	"God On My Side"	2:56
16.	"I Am Blessed (Live Version)"	4:44
Total length:		1:49:00
