= Global Release Day =

International coordination for new music

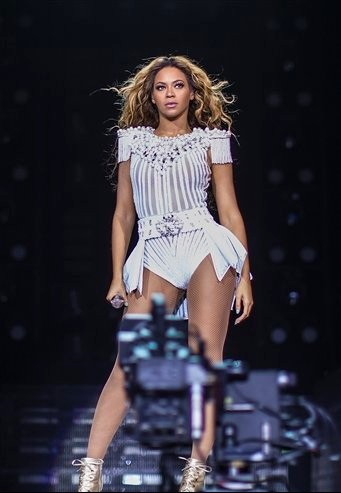
Beyoncé's 2013 self-titled album is credited with the setting of Friday as Global Release Day

Global Release Day (alternatively known as New Music Fridays) is the universal day of the week for releasing new music. Global Release Day was established in 2015 to combat the rise in music piracy, as music was previously released on different days internationally: Tuesdays in the United States and Canada, and other days in different markets. Friday was set as Global Release Day as a result of a trend of Friday releases that started with Beyoncé's 2013 surprise self-titled album.

== History ==
Historically, new music was made available on varying national release days. In major markets such as the United States and Canada, new music was released on Tuesdays, largely because the Billboard charts were published on Wednesday, and because retailers could prepare their stock ahead of the weekend. Other markets varied in their music release days, such as France and the United Kingdom where music was released on Mondays.

American singer-songwriter Beyoncé released her surprise self-titled album on Friday, December 13, 2013, in a break with industry norms. The album had no advance announcement or promotion prior to its release early on a Friday morning. Beyoncé wanted a digital-only release initially to avoid leaks that come from physical editions prior to the official release date. The lack of a physical edition upon release meant she did not have to observe the typical Tuesday release date to accommodate retailers stocking physical copies of the album prior to release day. The Friday release allowed fans across the world to experience the music at the same time, and new music on a Friday was seen as enabling listeners to enjoy the album over the weekend. Beyoncé debuted at number one on the Billboard 200 chart and became the fastest selling album on the iTunes Store with 828,773 copies sold in its first three days and surpassed 1 million copies sold after six days. This move set a trend of artists increasingly choosing to release their albums on Fridays.

In August 2014, it was reported that the music industry was considering the establishment of a global music release day. Due to increased piracy as a result of the rise of digital music and streaming, the International Federation of the Phonographic Industry (IFPI) decided to create a unified Global Release Day, on which music releases are made uniformly available around the world, to streamline global music consumption, minimize piracy, and create a culture-shaping moment each week. The Department of Record Stores, an affiliation group of independent record stores in the United States and Canada, proposed that the rest of the world adopt Tuesday as the global release day. They argued that Tuesday would ease the transition for the two largest music markets in the United Kingdom and North America who already had new releases on Mondays and Tuesdays respectively.

On February 26, 2015, the IFPI announced that Friday had been selected as a universal date for new music releases as Fridays and Saturdays are the days when consumer traffic is at its highest. Paychecks are also commonly distributed on Fridays which would increase potential music purchases with new releases. On June 11, the IFPI announced that Global Release Day, also known as New Music Fridays, would take effect from July 10, 2015. July was chosen as the starting month to allow time to iron out any kinks in the new schedule before the Q4 holiday season when music purchases increase. The IFPI co-ordinated the change to a unified release day across 45 participating countries in consultation with labels, retailers, artist representatives, music unions and chart companies. IFPI CEO Frances Moore said the change was "done primarily for the consumer" but discussed how more consumers in music stores on Fridays and Saturdays would lead to increased impulse buying of music. The IFPI launched the New Music Fridays brand awareness campaign and the #NewMusicFridays hashtag to bring attention to new releases becoming available on Fridays going forward.

Today, music releases are now uniformly available in all 45 signatory countries on Fridays at 00:01 local time. The change in release schedules has changed the previously traditional days when official music charts were published, as countries try to capture a full week's sales from Friday mornings to Thursday nights. For example, the Official Charts Company moved the UK singles chart from being published on a Sunday to a Friday, with the BBC also moving its new Top 40 charts program from Sundays to Fridays.
