= Grown Woman (Beyoncé song) =

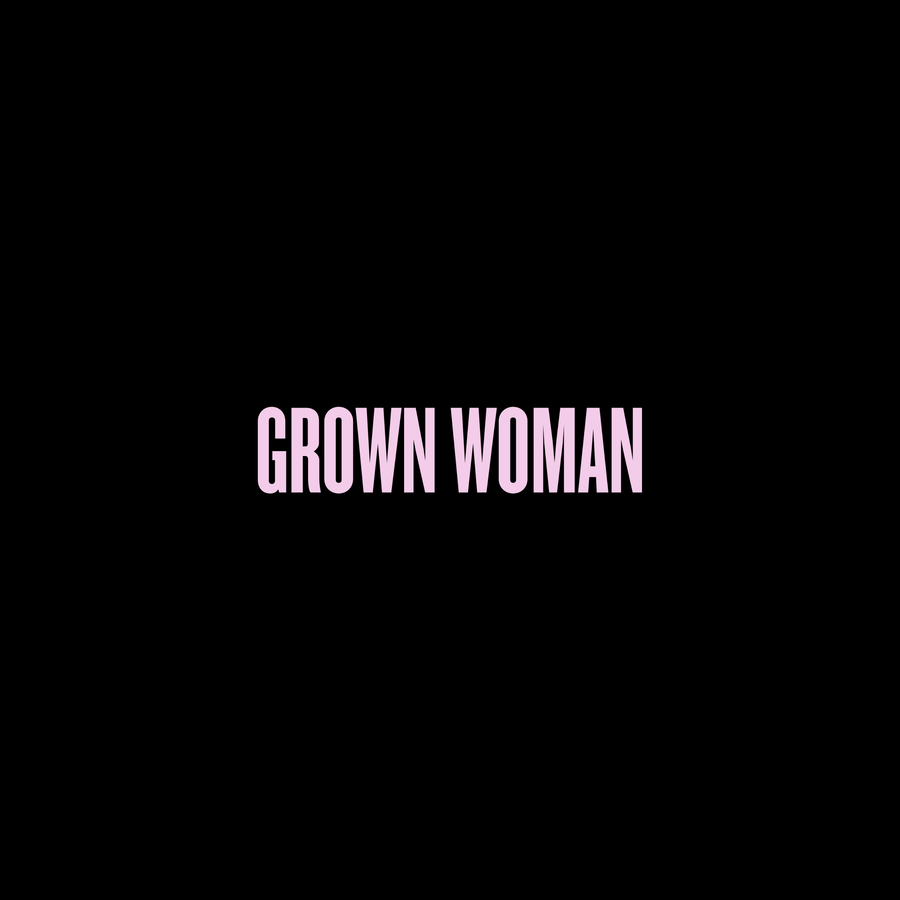

Promotional single by Beyoncé
- Released: December 13, 2023
- Recorded: 2013
- Studio: Jungle City Studios (New York City); Oven Studios (New York City)
- Genre: Afrobeat; pop; moombahton; bhangra
- Length: 5:10
- Label: Parkwood; Columbia
- Songwriters: Beyoncé Knowles; Timothy Mosley; Terius Nash; Jerome Harmon; Kelly Sheehan; Garland Mosley; Darryl Pearson; Chris Godbey
- Producers: Beyoncé; Timbaland

Music video
- "Grown Woman" on YouTube

"Grown Woman" is a 2013 song by American singer Beyoncé (with Guinean singer Ismaël Kouyaté), chosen as the promotional single for her fifth Pepsi campaign commercial (also in 2013). Originally written and recorded for potential inclusion on her fifth studio album, Beyoncé (2013), "Grown Woman" was only included as a bonus video on the Visual disc of the album. Music publication Uproxx considered the song a "fan favourite", with "African-influenced drums and Bey's empowered vocals"; the Evening Standard christened the song her "latest feminist anthem". Several unofficial remixes, released in 2013, received unsolicited airplay, causing the song to chart for eight weeks on the Billboard Dance Club Songs chart. The song eventually received an official release on December 13, 2023, to coincide with the tenth anniversary of the surprise release of Beyoncé.

== Background and composition ==
"Grown Woman" was written by Beyoncé, Timbaland, Chris Godbey, Sebastian, Kelly Sheehan, The-Dream, Darryl Pearson, and J-Roc, for reported inclusion onto what became her 2013 eponymous fifth album. The Los Angeles Times described the song as "an aggressive affirmation of her prowess over five minutes of frenetic African-influenced rhythms, tribal chants and multiple vocal breakdowns". The publication also noted an expansion on the sound of Beyoncé's Fela Kuti-influenced 4 (2011) single “End of Time", integrating more African vocals into the beat. MTV noted "Bhangra-esque" influences in the production. Lyrically, the song continues Beyoncé's thread of female empowerment, building on the "warrior queen motifs" of her past anthems, such as "Irreplaceable", "Single Ladies (Put a Ring on It)" and "Run the World (Girls)".

Several unofficial versions appeared on various music streaming services at the conclusion of the campaign, before a full leak of the original version was reported by USA Today, and several other music publications, in both May and August 2013.

A full-length visual was released alongside 16 other visuals and 14 songs upon the album's December 13, 2013, release, though no official audio was released.

== Reception ==
The song was met with critical acclaim. Men's publication GQ described the song as "sexy" and "classic Queen Bey", with a "perpetually stuck-in-your-head dance beat." Fact favorably compared the recording to Mosley's work on Justin Timberlake's The 20/20 Experience, mentioning the "playful and experimental form" of his instrumentals, described as "two parts moombahton, one part Song of the South." The Los Angeles Times described the song as "an empowering female anthem tailor-made for dance floors and repeat blasting in car stereos." The Michigan Chronicle mentioned the "tribal" influences, and predicted the record was "bound to be the ladies summer anthem..." Notion highlighted the "zestful melody and up-tempo flow... guaranteed to get you grooving in no time." Slate writer Forrest Wickman stated that the song "adheres to four pillars of Beydom": "A syncopated, uptempo beat, stabs of brass or synths to go over it, a chorus of female shout-along voices and a message of female empowerment."

== Music videos ==
60 seconds of the song were utilized for "Mirrors": the Pepsi campaign commercial in April 2013, directed by frequent Beyoncé collaborator Jake Nava, whom she had previously worked with on "Crazy in Love", "Baby Boy", and "Single Ladies (Put a Ring on It)", among others. "I had so much fun collaborating on this campaign with Pepsi," Beyoncé stated in a 2013 statement to Billboard. "I got to re-live some of my favorite past characters and looks. It was the first time I saw those costumes in years and it was very emotional. I'm proud of those moments and they all connect in some way and have helped me evolve into who I am today." In the commercial, Beyoncé takes a brief beverage break in the midst of a dance rehearsal in front of several mirrors, when Beyoncé is suddenly surrounded by various iterations of herself performing in past videos.

A full music video was released on December 13, 2013, as a bonus video on the Visual disc of Beyoncé's fifth studio album Beyoncé (2013). Also directed by British director Jake Nava, the video features Beyoncé as a "gum-chewing beauty-queen" reminiscing on her trophy-winning pageant past, using CGI technology to sing the song as younger versions of herself in "VHS-grainy" home video footage. Beyoncé is transported to a "psychedelic" space for the dance breakdown, with multiple cloned Beyoncés dancing alongside close friend Kelly Rowland and mother Tina Knowles.

An alternate version of the video was leaked on April 1, 2014, taking Beyoncé's original concept for her video — pairing home movies with her grown-up self — while adding "exuberantly animated doodles and extra bling".

== Live performances ==
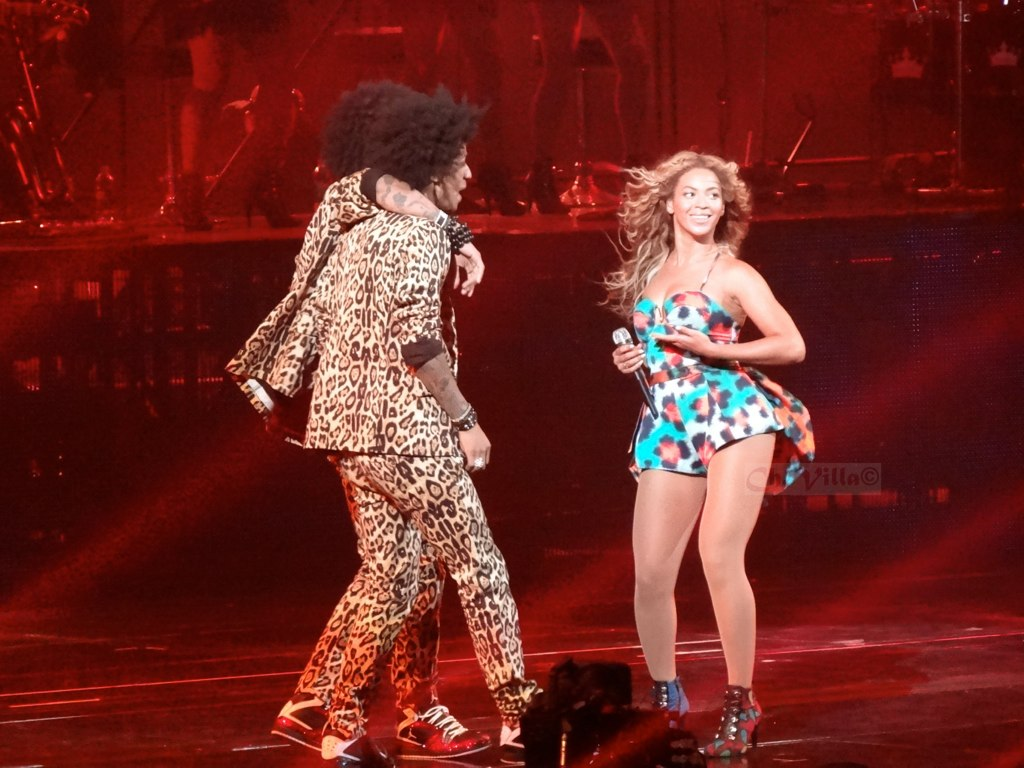
Beyoncé performing "Grown Woman" in Montreal with Les Twins.

Beyoncé performed the song for the first time on April 24, 2013 at her Mrs. Carter Show World Tour concert in Paris, France. Wearing a colorful Kenzo dress, she performed the song in its entirety toward the end of her sold-out show alongside Les Twins. On June 1, 2013, Beyoncé performed the song at the Chime for Change concert in London's Twickenham Stadium as a part of an interlude.

== Personnel ==
- Beyoncé – producer, composer, lyricist
- Timbaland – producer, composer, lyricist
- Jerome "J-Roc" Harmon – co-producer, composer, lyricist
- Darryl Pearson – co-producer, composer, lyricist
- Chris Godbey – composer, lyricist, mixing engineer, recording engineer
- Kelly Sheehan – composer, lyricist
- Terius Nash – composer, lyricist
- Garland Mosley – composer, lyricist
- Ismael Koyate – background vocals
- The Superpower Horns – horns
- Cole Kamen-Green – trumpet
- Nick Videen – saxophone
- Drew Sayers – saxophone
- Alex Asher – trombone
- Stuart White – recording engineer
- Colin Leonard – mastering engineer
- Matt Weber – assistant engineer
- Gloria Kaba – assistant engineer
- Fred Sladkey – assistant engineer

== Charts ==
2013 weekly chart performance for "Grown Woman"
Chart (2013)	Peak position
Suriname (Nationale Top 40)	21
US Dance Club Songs (Billboard)	28

2023 weekly chart performance for "Grown Woman"
Chart (2023)	Peak position
UK Singles Downloads (Official Charts)	67
UK Singles Sales (OCC)	76

== Certifications ==
Certifications for "Grown Woman"
Region	Certification	Certified units/sales
Brazil (Pro-Música Brasil)	Gold	30,000^{‡}
United States (RIAA)	Gold	500,000^{‡}
^{‡} Sales+streaming figures based on certification alone.

== Release history ==
"Grown Woman" release history
Region	Date	Format(s)	Version	Label(s)	Ref.
Various	July 21, 2013	Streaming	Monsieur Adi remix	Self-released	
Various	July 21, 2013	Streaming	Nervo remix	Self-released	
Various	July 21, 2013	Streaming	Ralphi Rosario remixes	Self-released	
Various	July 21, 2013	Streaming	Psyko Punkz remix	Self-released	
Various	December 13, 2023	Digital download; streaming	Original	Parkwood; Columbia	
