= Chris Tabron =

American record producer, mixer, and engineer

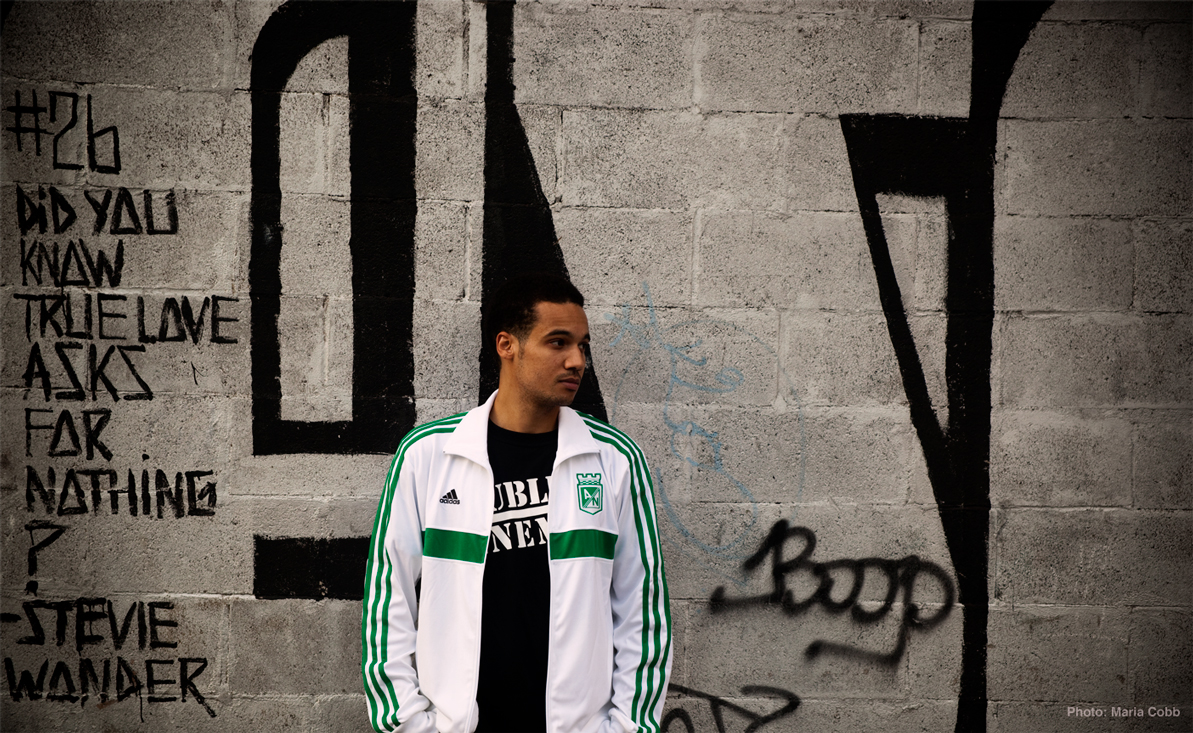
- Chris Tabron Photo by Maria Cobb

Background information
- Occupations: Record producer, engineer, mixer, musician, composer, songwriter
- Instruments: Vocals, guitar, keyboards, drums, programming
- Years active: 1999–present
- Labels: Columbia, Sony, Atlantic, Universal Motown, RCA Records, Downtown Records
- Website: http://www.christabron.com

Chris Tabron is an American record producer, mixer, and engineer, based in New York City.

As a producer or mixer, Tabron has worked on records by Beyoncé, Nicki Minaj, Mary J. Blige, Common, The Strokes, Robert Glasper, and Erykah Badu, including "Standing on the Sun (feat. Mr. Vegas)" for Beyoncé and Glasper's Miles Ahead (soundtrack) which won a Grammy Award for Best Compilation Soundtrack for Visual Media. as well as The New Abnormal by The Strokes which won a Grammy Award for Best Rock Album at the 63rd Annual Grammy Awards in 2021. Additionally, Chris has worked as a producer or mixer with a wide array of artists across all genres including Lianne La Havas, Battles, The Voidz, and Son Lux. In 2020, he executive produced and mixed House of Zef, the final album for South African duo, Die Antwoord. Tabron is known for hybrid mixing, an approach that utilizes both analog and digital equipment to achieve vast sonic textures and fast workflows.

Tabron was founder and multi-instrumentalist of the electronic-pop group, The Ten Paces, which released Cacophonics in 2005 on Sidepocket Recordings, that Tabron produced and engineered. He also does hip-hop, pop, and remix production work under the moniker Madison Avenue Girls. Tabron was musical director for top-ten Billboard hip-hop duo Chiddy Bang (Virgin Records) on their release tour for their debut album, Breakfast, which included performances on The Tonight Show with Jay Leno and Conan as well as for runway shows during New York Fashion Week. In this capacity, he has DJ'ed or written original compositions for designers Phillip Lim, Forever 21, Erin Fetherston, and Juan Carlos Obando.

From 2005 to 2008, Tabron published articles as a music journalist for The Village Voice and Dusted Magazine. In 2015, he wrote a chapter for the anthology The Cambridge Companion to Hip Hop entitled "The Glass: Hip Hop Production."

From 2007 to 2010, Tabron was senior house engineer at Future Shock Studio, a recording studio in Brooklyn, New York, owned by Grammy-nominated producer/engineer Alex Newport. At Future Shock, Tabron worked on albums by artists such as Death Cab for Cutie, ("Long Division" from Narrow Stairs, 2008), Frank Turner (Poetry of the Deed, Epitaph Records 2009), and So Many Dynamos.

In 2007, Tabron received a master's degree from New York University's Tisch School of the Arts, and is currently a Ph.D. candidate and adjunct instructor at New York University's Clive Davis Institute of Recorded Music.
