= Mr. Vegas =

Mr. Vegas OD
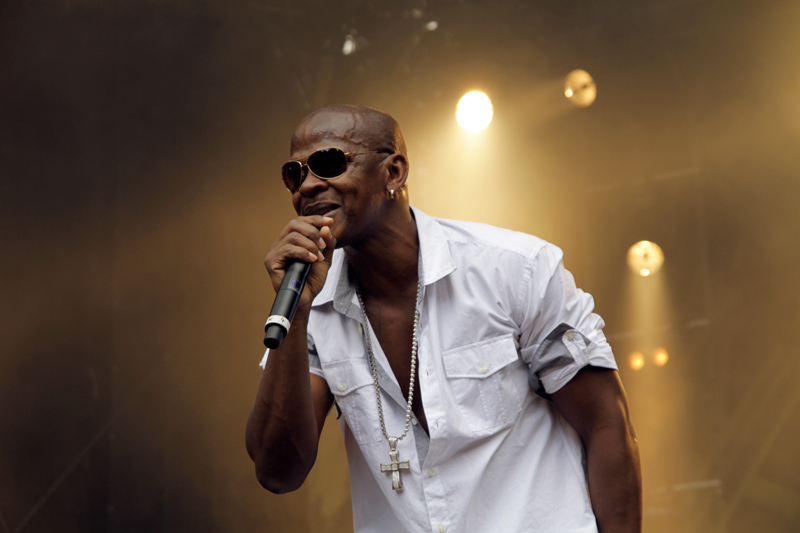
- Mr. Vegas performing at Ruhr Reggae Summer in 2010

Background information
- Born: Clifford Smith; 29 September 1974 (age 52); Kingston, Jamaica
- Genres: Dancehall; reggae
- Years active: 1997–present
- Labels: Greensleeves; VP; Interscope; Jet Star; Universal; MV Music

Clifford Smith (born 29 September 1974), better known as Mr. Vegas, is a Jamaican dancehall singjay.

== Career ==
Mr. Vegas emerged in the late 1990s as part of a wave of Jamaican dancehall artists gaining international attention.

He gained recognition with early recordings including "Nike Air".

His single "Heads High" charted on the US Billboard Hot R&B/Hip-Hop Songs chart.

In 2000, he released "Hot Gal Today", which peaked at number 66 on the Hot R&B/Hip-Hop Songs chart.

His single "Pull Up" (2004) reached number 98 on the US Billboard Hot 100 and number 68 on the Hot R&B/Hip-Hop Songs chart.

His albums have appeared on the Billboard Reggae Albums chart, including Damn Right (2001) and Sweet Jamaica (2012).

== Retirement ==
In September 2008, Smith announced that he was retiring from the music industry, citing unhappiness with his work and a desire to spend more time with his children and be "closer to God Almighty". However, he later returned to recording, releasing songs including "Man a Gallis", "Can't Stop Now" (with Major Lazer), "Mix Up Peggy", "Wanna See You Move" (DJ GQ) and "Fi Get Rich".

== Return to music ==
Mr. Vegas released Sweet Jamaica in May 2012.

To mark Jamaica’s 50th anniversary, he recorded material for the project Sweet Jamaica, which featured collaborations with several reggae artists.

In 2012, Mr. Vegas was nominated for Best Reggae Act at the MOBO Awards.

The album debuted at number 7 on the Billboard Reggae Albums chart.

In 2013, "Sweet Jamaica" was recognised as Song of the Year at the International Reggae and World Music Awards (IRAWMA).

Reggae Euphoria was released in September 2014.

He featured on a remixed version of Beyoncé's "Standing on the Sun", included on the 2014 Platinum Edition of her self-titled album.

== Education ==
In 2019, he completed his GED and later earned an associate degree from Broward College.

He graduated from Florida International University in 2022.

== Discography ==
- Heads High (1998)
- Reggae Max (1999)
- Mr. Vegas (1999)
- Damn Right (2001)
- Pull Up (2004)
- Hot It Up (2007)
- Sweet Jamaica (2012)
- Reggae Euphoria (2014)
- Lovers Rock and Soul (2015)
- This Is Dancehall (2016)
- ISM (2018)
- Ghetto Reggae (2025)
