= Superpower (song) =

2013 song by Beyoncé featuring Frank Ocean

Song by Beyoncé featuring Frank Ocean

from the album Beyoncé
- Released: December 13, 2013
- Recorded: 2013
- Studio: Jungle City Studios (New York, NY); Oven Studios (New York, NY); Mirrorball Studios (West Hollywood, CA)
- Genre: Doo-wop; R&B
- Length: 4:36
- Label: Parkwood; Columbia
- Songwriters: Pharrell Williams; Frank Ocean; Boots; Beyoncé Knowles
- Producer: Pharrell Williams

Music video
- "Superpower" on YouTube

"Superpower" is a song recorded by American singer Beyoncé, featuring Frank Ocean from her fifth studio album, Beyoncé (2013). It was written by Beyoncé and Ocean along with Boots (credited under his real name Jordan Asher) and Pharrell Williams who also served as its producer. "Superpower" is a slow-tempo R&B and doo-wop ballad which features both singers singing with a low vocal register over a multi-layered track. Lyrically, it talks about the power of love and unity and the empowering effects of a long-lasting relationship. It was well received by music critics who praised the singers' vocals and its musical production characteristic of Williams.

The music video for the song was directed by Jonas Åkerlund and released on the album on December 13, 2013. It features the singer leading a protesting group in which numerous celebrities make cameo appearances, most notably the singer's former Destiny's Child group bandmates Kelly Rowland and Michelle Williams. The video does not feature lip syncing like the singer's other works and it is shot in slow motion. The song was not performed by Beyoncé but was used as a snippet in interludes during various performances.

== Background ==
"Superpower" was written by Beyoncé, Frank Ocean, Boots and Pharrell Williams with the latter also handling its production. The vocals in the track were produced by Beyoncé while additional production was finished by producer Boots. It was recorded in three studios: Jungle City Studios, Oven Studios and Mirrorbal Studios. Kelly Rowland and Michelle Williams, Beyoncé's former bandmates from the group Destiny's Child provided background vocals along with Stefan Skarbek and Boots. The audio mixing of "Superpower" was completed by Tony Maserati at Mirrorbal Studios and Clockworks Studios and the track was eventually mastered by Tom Coyne and Aya Merrill at Sterling Sound. Beyoncé explained on her iTunes Radio channel that she considered "Superpower" to be a "powerful" song with strong vocals; she went on saying, "[T]he lyrics that Frank Ocean wrote... it's like he thought of one thing and the thought just keeps going and going... Basically the message is love is the most powerful thing we have and it doesn't matter if a war, if a riot is going on. When you are with the person you love, you can survive any and everything."

== Composition ==
According to the sheet music published on the website Musicnotes.com, "Superpower" was composed using 6/8 time in the key of C major with a slow tempo of 53 beats per minute. Musically, "Superpower" is a ballad with musical elements of contemporary and alternative R&B as well as doo-wop. Jon Pareles of The New York Times commented that the song "gives doo-wop a futuristic sheen". Similarly, The Quietus writer Mof Gimmers described it as a "2013 take on doo-wop". Mike Wass of the website Idolator compared the song with material from Ocean's album Channel Orange (2012). Beyoncé sings with her lower register and is later accompanied by multi-tracked harmonies which Neil McCormick of The Daily Telegraph compared with Destiny's Child. The instrumentation consists of "soft" strings and orchestral drum rolls, which McCormik of The Daily Telegraph compared to materials by Phil Spector "through a digital future prism". Ocean appears later on in the song; his vocals were described as sounding "mumbly" and deep on the track, complementary to Beyoncé's. He is heard singing his lines with lower, higher and same vocal register as her. Ocean was noted for singing several confessions during his part, including the lines "I thought the world wouldn't revolve without us". The Irish Times editor Una Mullally compared his singing style with Prince's on "Superpower".

In the lyrics, the protagonist sings about a "vow of lasting 'tough love'". She describes the superpower of love and experiencing her own full potential in a relationship, evident through the lyrics "And when I'm standing in this mirror after all these years/What I'm viewing is a little different/From what your eyes show you/I guess I didn't see myself before you". Bradley Stern from the website MuuMuse analyzed how the lines "The laws of the world never stopped us once 'cause together we got plenty of superpower" were backed by the fact the singer was part of the world's most famous supercouples. Clash writer Mike Diver opined that the song was an "anthem to blissful monogamy". Similarly, Cosmopolitan reviewer Alex Rees felt the lyrics analyzed the "power" of a firm relationship and its outcomes on a person's self-worth. Clíona Saidléar of Irish Examiner deemed "Superpower" to be the singer's most political song, challenging the notions of "current social practices". She elaborated,

Beyoncé eschews the patriarchy complicit shades of 'girl power', with its false dawn of nihilistic, individual empowerment without consideration for context. Instead, she chooses 'Superpower' to talk about the 'laws of the world... a subtle power' (read 'current social practices' here) where the revolution will be based on human connectedness, honesty and fragility: 'Just like you I can be scared, just like you I hope I'm sparred, it's tough love.'

== Critical reception ==
Andrew Hampp and Erika Ramirez of Billboard described "Superpower" as "a cinematic gift" and "[a] sweet duet of an imaginable force" adding that it showcased Williams's musical capabilities. The Daily Telegraph journalist Neil McCormick deemed it "outstanding" and praised the harmonies similar to Destiny's Child used in it. He also deemed it to be a "stand-out track" which "never quite takes off, as if restraint was the watchword". Greg Kot, writing for the Chicago Tribune felt that in the "marvelously understated duet", the singer "positively smolders" while showcasing strength due to a union. In a review for Idolator, Mike Wass described it as a "meandering alt-R&B experiment" noting that it was a "grower" that required more listens due to its "multi-layered treat that unfolds with each listen". In a review of Beyoncé, Chris Kelly of Fact concluded that it "closes strongly and subtly" with the ballads "Superpower", "Heaven" and "Blue". Rob Sheffield of Rolling Stone felt that "Superpower" was one of the "nasty highs" the singer managed to hit on the album. Mof Gimmers of The Quietus noted that the singer's "trademark head-spinning harmonies" were present in the song.

Entertainment Weekly writer Nick Catucci observed that the song "treat[s] relationships with the same raw instinct that suffuses her sex songs" on the album. MuuMuse's Bradley Stern described it as a "pensive, slow-strutting contemplation". Alex Rees, writing for the Cosmopolitan's felt that Beyoncé's "superpower" in the song was her voice and deemed it a "very empowering" number. Chris Bosman from Consequence of Sound wrote that "Frank Ocean cedes superhuman soul duties to Queen Bey". Latifah Muhammad from the BET called the ballad a "dilapidated union so formidable its deemed a 'Superpower,'" calling it "another shining moment for Bey". Jody Rosen writing for Vulture was more critical towards the track, saying that although there was "nice singing", it appeared "[a] bit wan". In another review, however, he called it "incandescent". Ryan B. Patrick in a review for Exclaim! was negative towards "Superpower", opining that it sounded like a leftover track from Channel Orange with "Beyoncé not quite owning it". In 2013, the song was included at number 228 on the annual Pazz & Jop poll compiled by The Village Voice.

== Music video ==
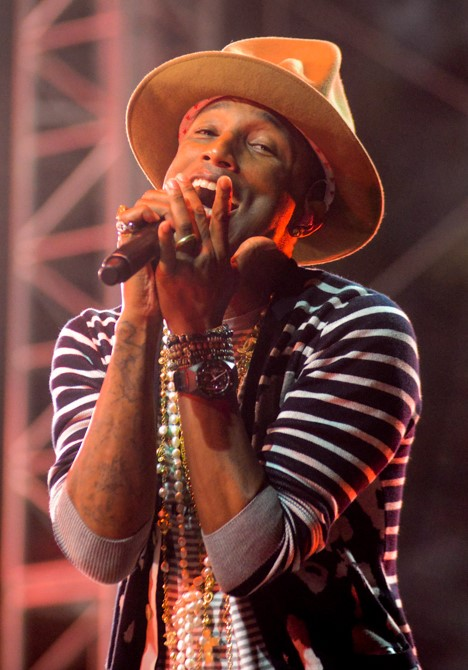
Pharrell Williams (pictured) who served as one of the writers of the song, makes a cameo appearance in the music video.

The music video for "Superpower" was directed by Jonas Åkerlund. It was filmed at the Hawthorne Plaza Shopping Center, a former shopping mall which was converted to a film set in Hawthorne, California. The singer was spotted by media on November 12, 2013, on the location set wearing a Louis Vuitton ski mask while filming the video. Beyoncé does not lip-sync or dance during the video. During an interview, she explained that "Superpower" was a song which "you can just put on repeat and put you in this trance, which is why I didn't want to perform it in the video". With that being said, she wanted to focus on slow motion shots of "really powerful imagery". It features former Destiny's Child members Kelly Rowland and Michelle Williams as well as Pharrell Williams, Luke James and Les Twins. The director said that it was a "spontaneous decision" to include them in the video; Frank Ocean was also originally planned to appear. Åkerlund elaborated on the video:

It's a very untraditional way of doing music videos, to not have her lip-synch. For Beyoncé, who's a dancer, it's very unusual to have a video without a dance part. I felt part of this idea for "Superpower" was to have stuff be in contrast to each other, so this song is very soft and very slow, but the action you see is aggressive and very big. We discussed it many times to see if we'd have the performance in the video or not. We decided no, and I think it works really, really well. It's kind of like a brave move, if you think about it. Most artists can act and have all these different things, but they'll still fall back on the performance.

A music video for "Superpower" was released on December 13, 2013, through the iTunes Store, in addition to a clip for every other track on the parent album. On November 24, 2014, the clip was also uploaded to the singer's Vevo account. A behind-the-scenes video was also released online on December 2, 2014, featuring commentary by director Åkerlund. The concept behind the video for "Superpower" revolves around Beyoncé leading a revolution. The video begins with quick shots of a desolate parking lot. Beyoncé then appears with a balaclava which she uses to cover her face up to the eyes. She is seen walking slowly towards the camera, as other people start joining her with flags and bats in their hands. Later in the video, she takes the mask off and the people surrounding her set various objects on fire using Molotov cocktails, write graffiti on walls, and break a car. Beyoncé is later seen holding a man with a mask who is lying on the ground. The end of the video sees the protesting group facing a line of SWAT policemen. They start running towards them and as the video comes to its end Beyoncé holds hands with the person next to her which is the same man she hugged on the ground in the previous scene. For the look in the video, she donned a cropped T-shirt, pants designed by Åkerlund, a green scarf by Michael Schmidt, shoes by Rodarte and rings by Lynn Ban.

Sam Lansky of the website Idolator, noted how the video was a "high-concept" one further "balancing out the low-level minimalism of the... track with arresting visuals and a star-studded cast". Mike Wass of the same website deemed it a recreation of the riot scene of the singer's own "Run the World (Girls)" (2011). He further described Destiny's Child reunion as "heartwarming". Michelle Collins, a journalist of Vanity Fair echoed his statements, noting how the band reunion was the video's key moment. Although Anupa Mistry of Spin felt that the video for "Superpower" was one of the "relatively mundane" on the visual album, it was a feat of "production value and styling". Kathy Iandoli from Vice, praised the singer's overall look in the clip. MuuMuse's Bradley Stern felt the clip was one of the singer's "most artistic moment", praising her "ridiculously sexy stealth superhero outfit". He interpreted the wall of police officers as critics, political statements and life obstacles and concluded that the last image where the singer is seen holding hands with the man next to her is a "lasting" one. The Fader writer Michael Zelenko said that the clip resembled a short movie with Beyoncé as "an Occupy-style protest heroine leading a ragtag gang". Listing it as the fifth best video on the album, Melinda Newman of HitFix elaborated how the video managed to transform the "simple love ballad into a political statement", furthering how it added meaning to its lyrics. rent DiCrescenzo of the magazine Time Out named it the sixth best on the album. Trent Wolbe of The Verge criticized Åkerlund's work on the album, feeling that his contributions "feel like boring opulence porn", something he found on "Superpower".

== Live performance and usage in media ==
On June 14, Frank Ocean performed his verses of "Superpower" during his appearance at the 2014 Bonnaroo Music Festival. During the 2014 MTV Video Music Awards, a short instrumental snippet of the song was played over a portion of Chimamanda Ngozi Adichie's TED talk "We Should All Be Feminists" was heard before Beyoncé started her performance of "Flawless". In 2016, "Superpower" was used as an interlude to "Mine" during The Formation World Tour.

== Personnel ==
Credits adapted from the album's liner notes and the singer's official website.

Song credits

- Writing – Pharrell Williams, Frank Ocean, Beyoncé Knowles
- Featured artist – Ocean
- Production – Williams
- Vocal production – Knowles
- Additional production – Boots
- Recording – Stuart White, Andrew Coleman; Mike Larson, James Krausse at Jungle City Studios, Oven Studios, New York City and Mirrorbal Studios, North Hollywood, Los Angeles
- Assistant engineering – Ramon Rivas, Matt Weber, Jon Castelli
- Digital editing and arrangement – Andrew Coleman, Stuart White
- Background vocals – Kelly Rowland, Michelle Williams, Stefan Skarbek, Boots
- Violin arrangement and performance – Margot
- Audio mixing – Tony Maserati; Mirrorbal Studios, Los Angeles and Clockworks Studios, Brooklyn
- Assistant mix engineering – Justin Hergett
- Audio mastering – Tom Coyne, Aya Merrill; Sterling Sound, New York City

Video credits

- Featuring – Kelly Rowland, Michelle Williams, Pharrell Williams, Luke James
- Director – Jonas Åkerlund
- Director of photography – Pär Ekberg
- Director of photography (second unit) – Todd Heater
- Executive producer – Scott Horan
- Producer – Scott Pourroy
- Production company – Black Dog Films
- Stylist – B. Åkerlund
- Additional styling – Ty Hunter, Raquel Smith, Tim White
- Art director – Christian Zollenkopf
- Production designer – Emma Fairley
- Editor – Luis Moreno
- Brand manager – Melissa Vargas
- Hair – Kim Kimble
- Make-up – Francesca Tolot
- Nails – Tom Bachik
- Color correction – NHB Berlin
- Visual effects – Kroma
- Photography – Robin Harper, Nick Farrell

== Certifications ==
Region	Certification	Certified units/sales
United States (RIAA)	Gold	500,000^{‡}
^{‡} Sales+streaming figures based on certification alone.
