= Lifeof9000 =

American recording artist and music engineer

- Also known as: 9000, Lifeof9000
- Born: Ramon Rivas; Queens, New York City, U.S.
- Genres: R&B; hip hop; pop
- Occupations: audio engineer, recording artist, television editor
- Years active: 1998–present
- Labels: Ruby Recordings; Republic Records; United Talent Agency

Ramon Rivas, better known by the stage name Lifeof9000, is an American music engineer, recording artist, and TV editor.

== Background ==
Rivas and his work has been acknowledged and awarded by the Recording Academy for the engineering and co-writing of numerous musical projects, most notably Beyoncé's Lemonade, Jay-Z's Magna Carta Holy Grail, and Ariana Grande's Sweetener album, in addition to other projects involving Cardi B, Alicia Keys, Justin Bieber, Pharrell, Queen Latifah, and Jermaine Dupri.

Rivas has also engineered and/or contributed to musical records for Nas, Megan Thee Stallion, Kanye West, Drake, Rick Ross, Nicki Minaj, J Balvin, Ed Sheeran, Jennifer Hudson, Destiny's Child, The Dream, Kelly Rowland, Ludacris, Outkast, Ciara, 50 Cent, T-Pain, N.E.R.D, Clipse, Maxwell, Frank Ocean, Kendrick Lamar, 2 Chainz, Ne-Yo, and Blue Ivy Carter. He has also worked on Indian-style urban production, including projects with Timbaland and Nelly Furtado.

In 2017, Utica-based rapper Trizzy signed Lifeof9000 to his first record deal. In May 2017, Lifeof9000 released his debut EP, Touch My Soul. In 2019, Rivas announced the release of his own studio singles, including one with Wu-Tang Clan member Raekwon, amassing coverage in music media.

== Television and film production ==
In a 2024 iHeart podcast interview about popular culture with Joey Florez, Rivas stated he has worked as a television editor for brands such as Starz and Netflix, in affiliation with UTA, having previously been credited for two Emmy awards.

== Honors & Awards ==
=== Grammy Award Nominations by the Recording Academy ===
==== Credits as Technical Personnel ====
| Year | Nominee / work | Award | Result |
|---|---|---|---|
| 2020 | King's Disease | Best Rap Album | Won |
| 2018 | Sweetener | Best Pop Album | Won |
| 2018 | Mi Gente | Best Urban Fusion/Performance | Nominated |
| 2016 | Lemonade | Album of the Year | Nominated |
| 2016 | Lemonade | Record of the Year | Nominated |
| 2016 | Lemonade | Song of the Year | Nominated |
| 2014 | The Pinkprint | Best Rap Album | Nominated |
| 2014 | x | Best Pop Vocal Album | Nominated |
| 2014 | x | Album of the Year | Nominated |
| 2014 | Girl | Album of the Year | Nominated |
| 2014 | Girl | Best Urban Contemporary Album | Won |
| 2014 | Girl | Best Pop Solo Performance | Won |
| 2014 | Girl | Best Music Video | Won |
| 2013 | Magna Carta Holy Grail | Best Rap/Sung Collaboration | Won |
| 2009 | The Blueprint 3 | Best Rap Album | Nominated |
| 2009 | The Blueprint 3 | Best Rap Solo Performance | Won |
| 2008 | Three Ringz | Best Contemporary R&B Album | Nominated |
| 2008 | Trav'lin' Light | Best Traditional Pop Vocal Album | Nominated |

=== Selected film credits ===
| Year | Film |
|---|---|
| 2020 | Alicia by Alicia Keys |
| 2015 | Fifty Shades of Grey Motion Soundtrack |
| 2014 | The Amazing Spider-Man 2 Original Motion Picture Soundtrack |
| 2010 | Despicable Me Motion Soundtrack |
