= Summertime (Beyoncé song) =

Single by Beyoncé featuring P. Diddy

from the album The Fighting Temptations (Music From The Motion Picture)
- A-side: "Crazy in Love"
- Released: October 28, 2003
- Studio: Daddy's House Recording Studios (New York, NY)
- Genre: R&B
- Length: 3:54
- Label: Columbia
- Songwriters: Beyoncé Knowles; Angela Beyincé; Sean "P. Diddy" Combs; Steven "Stevie J." Jordan; Adonis Shropshire; Varick "Smitty" Smith; Mario Winans
- Producers: Winans; P. Diddy

Beyoncé singles chronology
"Me, Myself and I" (2003)	"Summertime" (2003)	"Naughty Girl" (2004)

P. Diddy singles chronology
"Shake Ya Tailfeather" (2003)	"Summertime" (2003)	"Show Me Your Soul" (2003)

Audio video
- "Summertime" on YouTube

"Summertime" is a song recorded by American singer-songwriter Beyoncé, featuring American rapper P. Diddy. "Summertime" was written by Beyoncé, Angela Beyincé, P. Diddy, Steven "Stevie J." Jordan, Adonis Shropshire, Varick "Smitty" Smith and Mario Winans, while production was handled by Winans and P. Diddy. The song was later remixed to feature vocals from American rapper Ghostface Killah. "Summertime" was included on the soundtrack album for the film The Fighting Temptations (2003), in which Beyoncé played the lead female role. The original version of the song was released as a B-side to "Crazy in Love" in the UK and Australia, while it was issued as a 12-inch vinyl single in the United States through Columbia Records.

"Summertime" is an R&B song which lyrically refers to falling in love. Music critics generally complimented Beyoncé's vocals in the song and noted that it could have been included on her debut studio album, Dangerously in Love (2003). The song also charted on the US Billboard Hot R&B/Hip-Hop Songs chart in late 2003. The original version featuring P. Diddy and the remix version featuring Ghostface Killah peaked at number thirty-five and at number fifty-one respectively on the chart. Both versions charted for forty consecutive weeks. "Summertime" was part of Beyoncé's set list during the Dangerously in Love Tour (2003), and the Verizon Ladies First Tour (2004).

== Background and composition ==
The song has two different themes. It primarily talks about the romance and later marriage between the film's two main characters Darrin (played by Cuba Gooding Jr.) and Lilly (played by Beyoncé), as well as subtly hinting at Beyoncé's real-life relationship with rapper Jay-Z. Darrin, a shallow New York advertising executive, traveled to a small town in the deep south upon receiving word that his aunt has died and left him a sizable inheritance. Once in town, Darrin is informed that he will only receive the money if he successfully leads a local gospel group to victory at an upcoming competition. Reluctant but strapped for cash, Darrin takes on the task of finding the best singers in town and shaping the group up. Along the way, he becomes acclimated to the town with the help of his cousin Lucius (played by Mike Epps) and meets Lilly, a single mother who not only possesses an incredible voice but also the ability to warm Darrin's cold heart. Although Gooding's character, Darrin, was in love with Beyoncé's character, Lilly, the latter did not always feel the same until later on in the film. Near the end of the film, he proposes to her and she accepts. They eventually get married (offscreen) and within eighteen months they had a baby son together, making Darrin a father and also stepfather to Lilly's other son.

"Summertime" was the only song which appeared on the soundtrack album of The Fighting Temptations but not in the movie itself. As a whole, seven tracks featured the vocals of Beyoncé. The latter has a starring role in the film, along with a choir made up of gospel, R&B and hip-hop recording artists. Faith Evans, Angie Stone, Melba Moore, Rev. Shirley Caesar, The O'Jays, Montell Jordan, T-Bone, and Zane are all seen on the film and perform on the soundtrack. "Summertime" was written by Beyoncé, Angela Beyincé, Sean Combs, Steven "Steven J." Jordan, Adonis Shropshire, Varick "Smitty" Smith and Mario Winans while production was handled by Winans and P. Diddy. Tim Sendra of Allmusic describes "Summertime" as an R&B "sweet love song" with lush sampled strings and acoustic guitars. The lyrics of the song do not reveal the film's plot, but they do tell that it has been a year since Darrin and Lilly met and they have gotten closer which could possibly be referring to their marriage. According to Dani Boobyer of the UK-based website The Situation, its lyrics make reference to "failing in love in the summer sun."

== Release ==
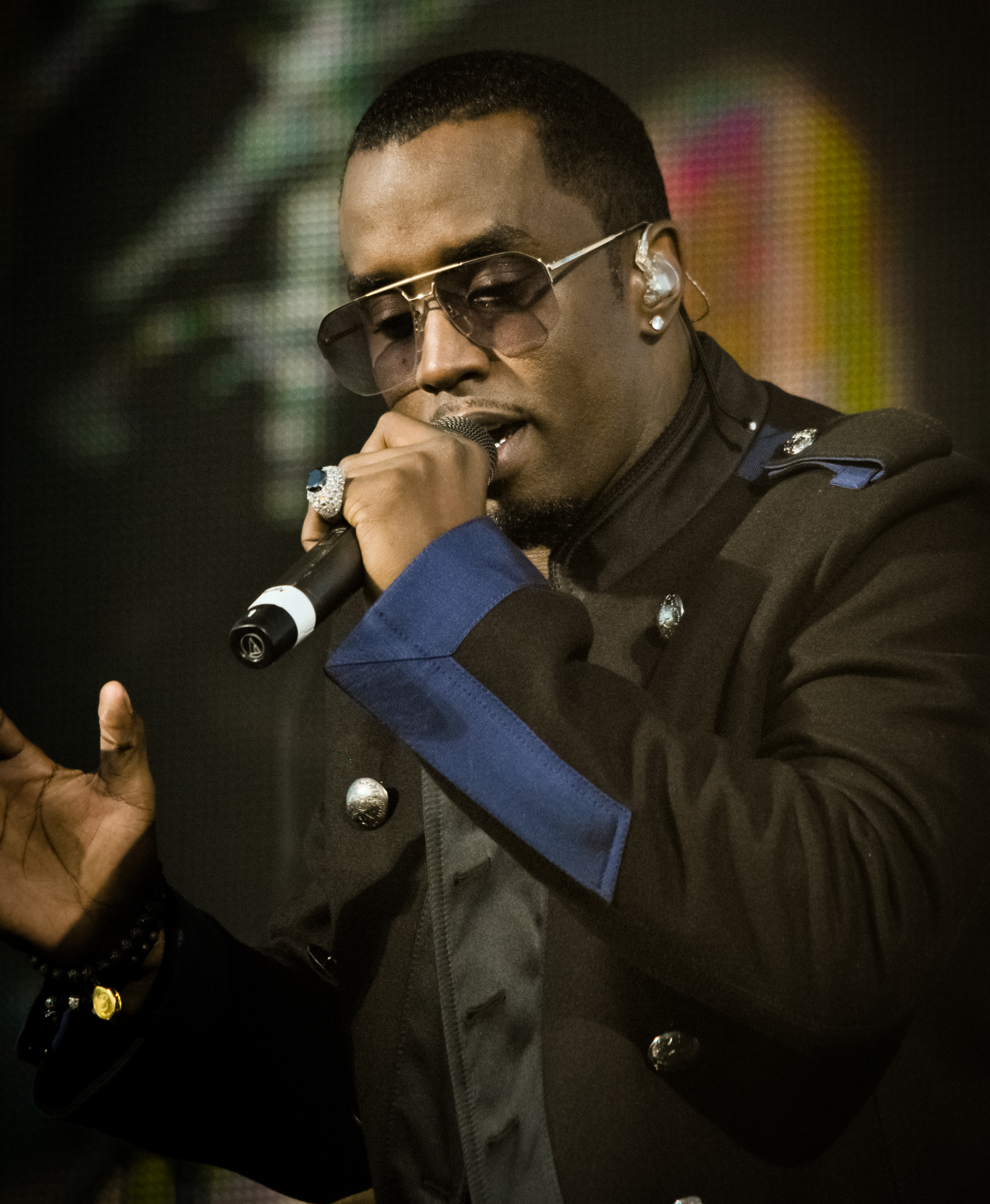
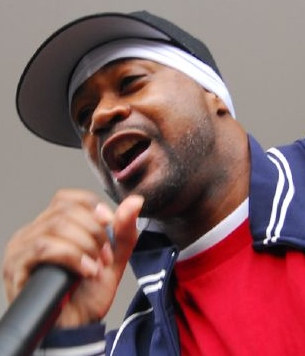
P. Diddy (left) features on the original version of the song, while Ghostface Killah (right) features on a remixed version.

During a string of soundtrack releases, Beyoncé commented on the song in an interview with Billboard and stated: "A lot of music was written especially for the film. At first I was concerned about the timing of the soundtrack, [because] my solo album was supposed to come out way before the movie. But then the solo album got delayed." While later announcing the release of the soundtrack album in a press release, Beyoncé said: "Once you hear the song ['Fighting Temptation'], and all the music in this film, you can't help but fall in love with it. You'll definitely get emotional. You might become happy or even sad, but your heart will get full. All the songs are touching and spiritual, and that's what the movie itself is like."

"Summertime" was issued as a 12" vinyl single in the United States by Columbia Records on October 28, 2003, and was later serviced to radio by the label. The original version of the song also served as the B-side to Beyoncé's debut solo lead single "Crazy in Love" (2003) in the UK and Australia. "Summertime" was additionally included on Beyoncé's 2005 mixtape Speak My Mind. The song was later referenced in Rochelle Alers's short story "Summer Madness", from the anthology Four Degrees of Heat (2004–07).

== Reception ==
In a summer issue of Vibe, the song was included on a list of the top songs for a summer playlist. Research director Laura Checkoway reviewed the remix of the track and stated: "Ghost's game is tight." In an Amazon.com editorial review, Tom Keogh stated that the song "proves a breezy dance number." Tim Sendra of Allmusic wrote that "Summertime" features "a wonderful vocal from Beyoncé." He also considered that it would have made a perfect addition to her debut solo studio album, Dangerously in Love (2003). Dani Boobyer of The Situation commented that the song is "infectious" and that it ends the soundtrack album "on a smooth, laid-back high." Both the original version featuring P. Diddy and remix version featuring Ghostface Killah charted for forty weeks on the US Billboard Hot R&B/Hip-Hop Singles & Tracks. During the week of August 16, 2003, the remix featuring Ghostface Killah charted and peaked at number fifty-one. During the week of September 20, 2003, the original version charted at number thirty-five. The remix also charted at number eight on the US Billboard Bubbling Under Hot 100 Singles chart, which acts as a twenty five-song extension to the Billboard Hot 100. Q Magazine ranked it as the 999th greatest song ever.

== Live performances ==
Although Beyoncé did not perform the song in any televised appearances, the song was a part of her set list on her tours. During the Verizon Ladies First Tour, which also featured Alicia Keys, Missy Elliott and Tamia, Beyoncé performed "Summertime" in New York in front of more than 20,000 fans. Shaheem Reid of MTV News commented that Beyoncé "stepped in the name of love" during the breakdown of the song. Beyoncé also sung "Summertime" with an interpolation of R. Kelly's "Step in the Name of Love" on her first solo tour Dangerously in Love Tour (2003) at the Wembley Arena in London, England. Beyoncé performed the song in a yellow summer-dress that was bedazzled in rhinestones across the upper breast area and around the bottom of the dress. The song, alongside its live version, was included on a live DVD/CD titled Live at Wembley. "Summertime" serves as the twelfth track of the live DVD. A performance of the remix of the song was included on the Jay-Z documentary Fade to Black (2004), which features Beyoncé performing with Ghostface Killah.

== Track listing ==
US 12" vinyl single
No.	Title	Length
1.	"Summertime" (featuring P. Diddy) (Album Version)	3:53
2.	"Summertime" (Album Version Instrumental)	3:34
3.	"Summertime" (featuring P.Diddy) (A Capella)	2:59
4.	"Summertime" (featuring Ghostface Killah) (Remix)	4:04
5.	"Summertime" (Remix Instrumental)	3:34
6.	"Summertime" (featuring Ghostface Killah) (A Capella)	3:08

== Charts ==
Weekly chart performance for "Summertime"
Chart (2003)	Peak position
US Bubbling Under Hot 100 Singles (Billboard) Remix	8
US Hot R&B/Hip-Hop Songs (Billboard)	35
US Hot R&B/Hip-Hop Songs (Billboard) Remix	51

== Certifications ==
Region	Certification	Certified units/sales
New Zealand (RMNZ)	Platinum	30,000^{‡}
^{‡} Sales+streaming figures based on certification alone.
