= Live at Wembley (Beyoncé album) =

2004 live video album by Beyoncé

Live album / video by Beyoncé
- Released: April 26, 2004
- Recorded: November 10, 2003
- Venues: Wembley Arena (London, England)
- Genre: R&B
- Length: 1:16:58 (DVD); 53:00 (VIP Admittance); 34:16 (CD); 2:44:14 (total)
- Labels: Sony Urban; Columbia
- Director: Janie Valentine
- Producers: Beyoncé Knowles; Chink Santana; Soul Diggaz; The Neptunes; Maurice Joshua; Junior Vasquez; Victor Calderone; Scott Storch; HR Crump

Beyoncé chronology
True Star: A Private Performance (2004)	Live at Wembley (2004)	B'Day (2006)

Beyoncé video chronology
Live at Wembley (2004)	Beyoncé: The Ultimate Performer (2006)

Live at Wembley is a video album by American singer-songwriter Beyoncé. It was released on April 26, 2004, by Sony Urban Music and Columbia Music Video. The DVD features her concert at Wembley Arena in London, as part of her Dangerously in Love Tour in support of her debut solo studio album Dangerously in Love (2003). Most of the songs on Live at Wembley originate from Dangerously in Love, although Beyoncé also performed a medley of past songs by her former group Destiny's Child. Live at Wembley was positively received by critics, with AllMusic giving it a grade of three-and-a-half stars out of five. The cover of Rose Royce's "Wishing on a Star", included on the album, was nominated in the category for Best Female R&B Vocal Performance at the 48th Annual Grammy Awards (2006).

The album debuted at number 17 on the US Billboard 200, selling 45,000 copies in its first week. It also charted on the US Billboard Top R&B/Hip-Hop Albums at number eight. Live at Wembley managed to top the DVD charts in the United States, Australia and Spain and peaked within the top 10 in Austria, Belgium, Netherlands, Italy and the United Kingdom. The DVD was certified double platinum by the Australian Recording Industry Association (ARIA) and the Recording Industry Association of America (RIAA). The album was also certified gold by the Recording Industry Association of Japan (RIAJ).

== Background and development ==
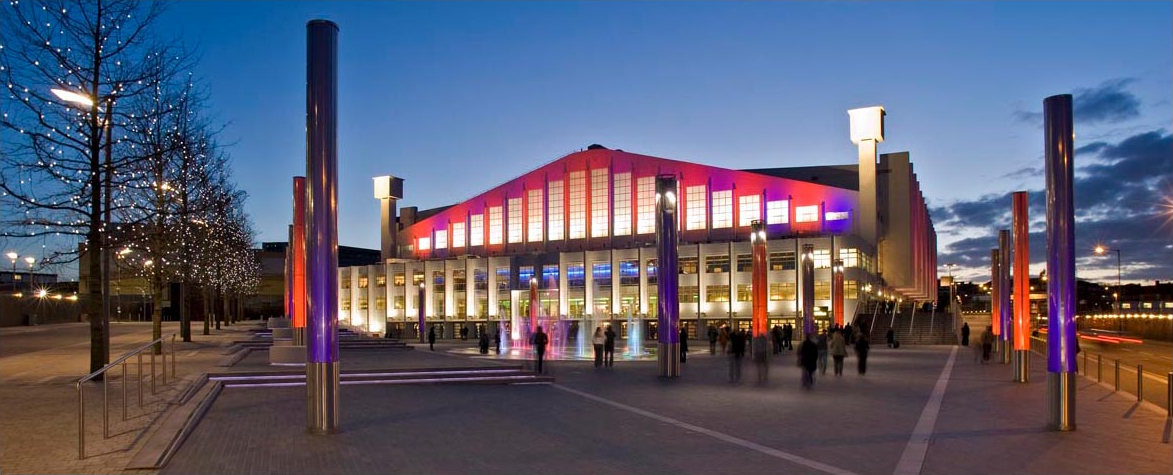
Live at Wembley was filmed at the Wembley Arena (pictured) in London

Live at Wembley was filmed at the London's Wembley Arena show of the Dangerously in Love Tour, Beyoncé's first international solo tour, on November 10, 2003. The tour supported her debut solo album, Dangerously in Love (2003). Most of the songs on Live at Wembley originate from that album, but it also contains a medley of past songs by her former group Destiny's Child and two soundtrack singles: "Work It Out" and "Summertime". The second disc of Live at Wembley contains three previously unreleased studio recorded songs, including a cover of Rose Royce's "Wishing on a Star", and one remix each of "Crazy in Love", "Baby Boy" and "Naughty Girl". Behind-the-scenes footage can be also seen on the DVD.

The concert audio was mixed by Rick Camp, the same engineer who mixed at the concert venues. It is uncommon for mix engineers to specialize in both live and recorded mixing. For Camp, "Mixing Beyoncé is a pleasure because she's a real singer and makes it easy. There is hardly an overdub on this project — it's 95 percent live Beyoncé." He further talked about the collaboration with Beyoncé with Mix magazine, saying: "In my 22 years of mixing, I've never come across anyone who could deliver like she does: vocally and her ability to do a show. I've seen this young woman run across a 60-foot stage, hit every note and never miss a thing. And that makes my job so much easier."

== Show synopsis ==
On stage, Beyoncé was backed by several male and female dancers performing choreography during the show. DJ Diamond who served as a DJ during the performances and a backing band provided the music. The performance starts with footage of the crowd during the concert cheering before the appearance of Beyoncé. The curtains are lifted to reveal the stage and Beyoncé appears in red clothes hanging upside down while being taken to a sofa on the stage with a harness singing "Baby Boy". She is backed by a big screen and several dancers on stage who perform a choreography around her. She later starts dancing with them as the song plays and a breakdown towards the end is also featured. She asks from the girls in the crowd to sing to "Naughty Girl" as she dances with background dancers while the words "Naughty Girl" are displayed on the screen behind her. Towards the end of the song she performs portions of Vanity 6's song "Nasty Girl" (1982) as a short dance break. The lights are turned off and later silhouettes of Beyoncé and her dancers appear performing a choreography in front of the screen which is colored white while a backing track is played. She continues to perform a cover version of Little Willie John's song "Fever" wearing white pieces of wardrobe backed by four male dancers. The words "Pure Players" start appearing on the screen as a man's voice says them and "Hip Hop Star" is performed next with Big Boi's and Sleepy Brown's vocals played on a backing track while Beyoncé performs a choreography with several background dancers. "Yes" is performed with Beyoncé and her female dancers dancing on a fence. "Work It Out" follows and Beyoncé tells the fans that she's going to "slow it down" for the performance of "Gift from Virgo" as she hangs in the air on a yellow curtain wearing a yellow dress. In the middle of the song, she is taken down to the stage where she continues to perform the song.

She continues telling to the crowd that she would sing a song from Dangerously in Love further asking the attendees how many of them have the album. She then introduces "Be with You" as one of her favorite slow jams and starts singing it. For the beginning of "Speechless" she sits on a chair singing the song. She asks the fans in the arena to cheer and announced "Well, this is my very first solo tour as an artist and I'm very happy to share this wonderful experience with you all tonight in London". She then starts performing a short Destiny's Child medley beginning with "Bug a Boo". Beyoncé then tells the story about the group's first single "No, No, No Part 2" and continues performing the song. "Bootylicious", "Jumpin' Jumpin'", "Say My Name", "Independent Women Part I", "'03 Bonnie & Clyde" and "Survivor" are performed afterwards as part of the medley. She introduces the next song "Me, Myself and I" saying that she wrote it for all the ladies, "I thought it was something we all need to hear. When we get in these relationships they don't work out. Sometimes we blame the man, we blame another girl, we blame ourselves. But I think we should take every experience and learn a lesson out of it, even the bad experiences and I want all the ladies to know that we will never disappoint ourselves. You'll always have yourself." She introduces the next song "Summertime" as one of her favorite songs asking from the crowd to dance further performing a step dance while footage of flowers was projected on the screen. The lights go out again and Beyoncé appears wearing a grey, sparkly dress for an extended performance of "Dangerously in Love" surrounded by smoke. After the word "Beyoncé" is written on the screen several times, she appears on a staircase wearing a long shirt as the opening lines of "Crazy in Love" start and the song's music video is projected on the screen. Beyoncé then continues singing the song and performing its choreography with her female background dancers and confetti are dropped on stage during the end of the performance.

== Release and promotion ==
Live at Wembley premiered at Regal Entertainment Group cinemas around the United States on April 26, 2004. Tickets for the theater premieres were purchasable by members of the public. The album was released by Sony Music Entertainment and RCA Records in Europe the same day, and by Columbia Music Video in United States the following day. It was released in both CD and DVD formats. On August 17, 2010, Beyoncé's cover of "Wishing on a Star" was released as a promotional single through several online digital retailers. It peaked at number one on the Bubbling Under R&B/Hip-Hop Singles and number 28 on the US Adult R&B Airplay chart. At the 48th Grammy Awards held on February 8, 2006, at the Staples Center in Los Angeles, California, the cover received a nomination for Best Female R&B Vocal Performance.

== Critical reception ==
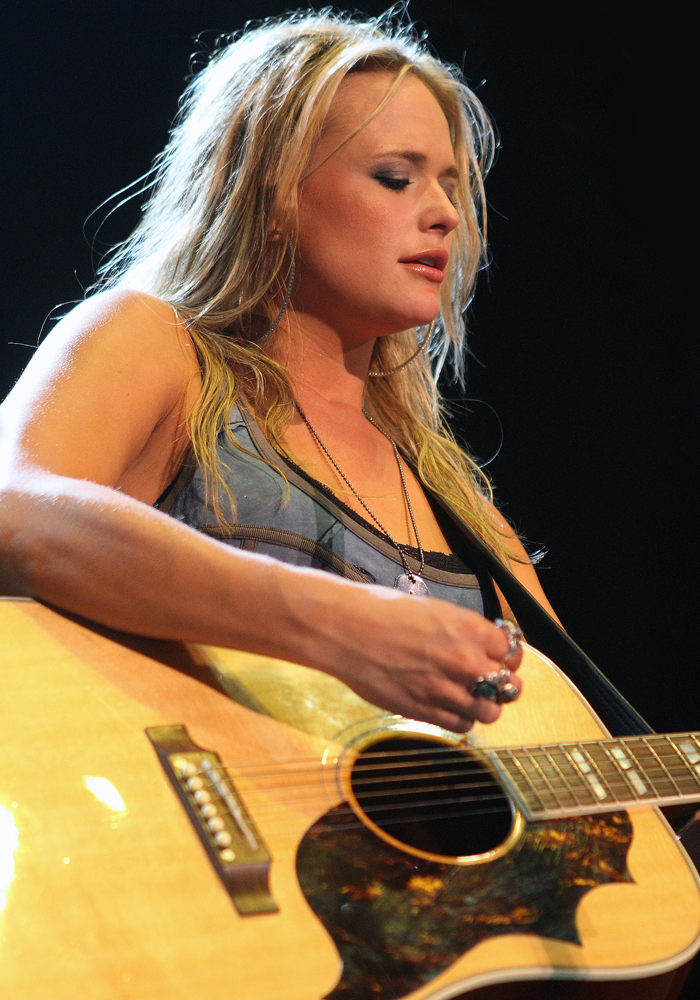
American country artist Miranda Lambert (pictured) credited the album for influencing her live performances.

Website AllMusic graded the album with three-and-a-half stars out of five. A writer further praised the CD of the album, writing that "a fun, late-1970s/early-'80s vibe pervades the record". The writer added that the album "opens with a sexy cover of... 'Wishing on a Star'... 'What's It Gonna Be' drips honeyed harmonies over a funky beat, while 'My First Time' falls somewhere between Rufus and Shalamar, with its dreamy '80s-funk-fueled R&B." He further praised the soulful slow-tempo remix version of "Crazy in Love" and the high-powered techno reworking of "Baby Boy". The DVD was also included in Vibe magazine's list of "Get in Tune With New Music" in June 2004. In an interview with The New York Times in 2007, American singer Miranda Lambert stated that she admired Beyoncé's performance in Live at Wembley, saying "The charisma and the confidence — she's the ultimate diva." She further revealed that the album inspired her to "take little bits from that [Beyoncé's performance] for her live shows."

== Commercial performance ==
Live at Wembley debuted at number 17 on the US Billboard 200, selling 45,000 copies in its first week. The DVD was certified double platinum by the Recording Industry Association of America (RIAA) for shipping 200,000 copies to retailers inside the United States. According to Nielsen SoundScan, it had sold 264,000 copies in the United States by October 2007, while as of October 6, 2010, it has sold 197,000 digital downloads. Live at Wembley entered the Schweizer Hitparade Albums Chart in Switzerland on May 16, 2004, at number 73, and moved to number 89 the following week, before dropping out of the chart. The album spent one week on the AFP Albums Chart in Portugal at number 26. It also spent four weeks in the German Albums Chart, peaking at number 59.

Live at Wembley peaked at number one on the Billboard Top Music Video chart in May 2004. The album debuted atop the ARIA DVD Chart in Australia the week ending on May 24, 2004, and remained in the chart for 32 weeks, dropping out in January 2005. It was certified double platinum by the Australian Recording Industry Association (ARIA) for selling 30,000 copies. Live at Wembley spent 20 weeks in the Oricon Albums Chart in Japan, peaking at number eight. On July 22, 2004, the album was certified gold by the Recording Industry Association of Japan (RIAJ), denoting shipment of 100,000 units. In Italy, the album appeared at number five on the FIMI DVD Chart ending April 4, 2010, but did not re-enter the chart. Live at Wembley became the third-best-selling music DVD in the world in 2004.

== Track listing ==
=== DVD ===
Live at Wembley
No.	Title	Length
1.	"Baby Boy"	4:58
2.	"Naughty Girl"	4:12
3.	"Fever"	5:57
4.	"Hip Hop Star"	4:31
5.	"Yes"	4:11
6.	"Work It Out"	3:47
7.	"Gift from Virgo"	3:15
8.	"Be with You"	3:58
9.	"Speechless"	5:00
10.	"DC Medley" (Consists of "Bug a Boo", "No, No, No Part 2", "Bootylicious", "Jumpin' Jumpin'", "Say My Name", "Independent Women Part I", "'03 Bonnie & Clyde" and "Survivor")	10:43
11.	"Me, Myself and I"	5:14
12.	"Summertime"	5:30
13.	"Dangerously in Love 2"	8:34
14.	"Crazy in Love"	8:03
15.	"Credits"	1:45
Total length:		76:58

VIP Admittance (bonus videos)
No.	Title	Length
1.	"Backstage"	8:38
2.	"Staging/Choreography"	5:51
3.	"Beyoncé's Dressing Room"	5:48
4.	"Show Favorites"	3:06
5.	"Beyoncé – Solo Artist"	3:25
6.	"A Day in London"	4:58
7.	"Meet the Fans"	2:58
8.	"A Conversation with Beyoncé"	16:26
9.	"Crazy in Love" (Live from the 2004 Brit Awards)	3:42
10.	"L'Oréal Commercial"	0:31
11.	"Destiny's Child Update"	0:17
Total length:		53:00

=== CD ===
No.	Title	Writer(s)	Length
1.	"Wishing on a Star"	Billie Rae Calvin	4:09
2.	"What's It Gonna Be"	Beyoncé Knowles; LaShaun Owens; Karrim Mack; Corte Ellis; Larry Troutman; Roger Troutman; Kandice Love	3:37
3.	"My First Time"	Knowles; Pharrell Williams; Chad Hugo	4:25
4.	"Krazy in Luv" (Maurice's Nu Soul Remix)	Knowles; Rich Harrison; Shawn Carter; Eugene Record	6:28
5.	"Baby Boy" (Junior's World Mixshow)	Knowles; Scott Storch; Sean Henriques; Robert Waller; Carter	6:39
6.	"Naughty Girl" (Calderone Quayle Club Mix)	Knowles; Storch; Waller; Angela Beyincé; Pete Bellotte; Giorgio Moroder; Donna Summer	9:38
Total length:			34:16

Japanese edition (bonus tracks)
No.	Title	Length
7.	"Naughty Girl" (featuring Lil' Kim)	3:51
8.	"Naïve" (HR Crump Remix with Solange Knowles and Da Brat)	3:40
Total length:		41:07

== Personnel ==
Credits adapted from liner notes and AllMusic.

- Sharon Ali – producer, video producer
- Zakari Asher – dancer
- Bill Ashworth – camera operator
- Carmit Bachar – dancer
- Peter Barnes – lighting design
- Alan Beechey – lighting technician
- Ahmet Bekir – camera operator
- Angela Beyincé – personal assistant
- Beyoncé – creation
- John Blow – editing
- Daniel Boland – lighting director
- Lanar Brantley – bass, music director
- Charlie Bryan – camera operator
- Lenora Dee Bryant – wardrobe
- William Burke – Pro-Tools
- Anthony Burrell – dance director, dancer
- Kim Burse – creation, creative director
- Anwar Burton or "Flli" – dancer
- Alice Butts – package design
- Quincy S. Jackson - marketing
- Thom Cadley – mixing, surround sound
- Rick Camp – engineer
- Shawn Carrington – guitar
- Matt Cashman – camera operator
- Justin Collie – lighting director
- Mike Colucci – set construction
- Annie Crofts – liner note producer
- Mark Cruickshank – camera operator
- Mark Davies – camera operator
- Ceire Deery – production coordination
- Milan Dillard – dancer
- DJ Diamond – DJ
- Richard Ellis – camera operator
- Renece Fincher – dancer
- Alan Floyd – tour manager
- Aisha Francis – dance director, dancer
- Michael Garabedian – set construction
- Frank Gatson Jr. – choreographer, creation, staging
- Danielle Green – production coordination
- Brandon Henchel – dancer
- Gerald Heyward – drums
- Tim Highmoor – camera operator
- Chris Hollier – camera operator
- Adrian Homeshaw – camera operator
- Tyrone"Ty" Hunter – assistant hair stylist, stylistic advisor
- Chris Issacson – technician
- Ed Jarman – video engineer
- Paul Jarvis – camera operator
- Scott Jenkins – camera operator
- Harold Jones – production coordination
- Pete Jones – sound recording
- Chris Keating – video director
- Julia Knowles – director, producer
- Mathew Knowles – executive producer
- Tina Knowles – stylist
- Casper Leaver – camera operator
- Melanie Lewis-Yribar – dancer
- Jim Littlehayles – camera operator
- Sophie Lote – production coordination
- Carl Lott – drum technician, guitar technician
- Darragh McAuliffe – lighting technician
- James "McGoo" McGregor – DJ, drum technician
- Neil McLintock – camera operator
- Nahum – director, editing
- Kenneth Nash – monitor engineer
- Naomi Neufeld – technical director
- Vincent Perreux – sound technician
- Arthur Ross – camera operator
- Mark Scott – engineer, sound recording
- Rod Spicer – photography
- Tim Summerhayes – audio supervisor
- Horace Ward – engineer
- Daniel Weatherspoon – keyboards
- Mark Wilder – mastering
- Joe "Flip" Wilson – keyboards

== Charts ==
=== Weekly charts ===
Chart (2004–10)	Peak position
Argentine Music DVD (CAPIF)	8
Australian Music DVD (ARIA)	1
Austrian Music DVD (Ö3 Austria)	2
Belgian Music DVD (Ultratop Flanders)	3
Belgian Music DVD (Ultratop Wallonia)	2
Dutch Music DVD (MegaCharts)	5
German Albums (Offizielle Top 100)	59
Greek International Albums (IFPI Greece)	7
Italian Music DVD (FIMI)	5
Japanese Albums (Oricon)	8
Portuguese Music DVD (AFP)	26
Swiss Albums (Schweizer Hitparade)	73
Spanish Music DVD (PROMUSICAE)	1
UK Music Videos (OCC)	2
US Billboard 200	17
US Top R&B/Hip-Hop Albums (Billboard)	8
US Music Videos (Billboard)	1

=== Year-end charts ===
Chart (2004)	Position
Belgian Music DVD (Ultratop Flanders)	32
Belgian Music DVD (Ultratop Wallonia)	40
Spanish Music DVD (PROMUSICAE)	9
Worldwide Music DVD (IFPI)	3

== Certifications ==
Video certifications for Live at Wembley
Region	Certification	Certified units/sales
Australia (ARIA)	2× Platinum	30,000^{^}
France (SNEP)	Gold	10,000^{*}
Japan (RIAJ) Music album	Gold	100,000^{^}
South Korea	—	2,707
Spain (Promusicae)	Gold	10,000^{^}
United Kingdom (BPI)	Gold	25,000^{^}
United States (RIAA)	2× Platinum	200,000^{^}
^{*} Sales figures based on certification alone.^{^} Shipments figures based on certification alone.

== Release history ==
Release dates and formats for Live at Wembley
Region	Date	Format(s)	Label(s)	Ref.
France	April 26, 2004	DVD+CD	Sony Music	
Germany	April 26, 2004	DVD+CD	Sony Music	
Netherlands	April 26, 2004	DVD+CD	Sony Music	
United Kingdom	April 26, 2004	DVD+CD	Columbia	
United States	April 27, 2004	DVD+CD	Columbia; Music World; Sony Urban	
Japan	July 22, 2004	DVD+CD	Sony Music Japan	
Netherlands	March 27, 2008	DVD	Sony BMG	
Canada	May 6, 2008	DVD	Sony BMG	
France	December 15, 2008	DVD	Sony Music	
