= Me, Myself and I (Beyoncé song) =

2003 single by Beyoncé

Single by Beyoncé

from the album Dangerously in Love
- Released: October 19, 2003
- Studio: South Beach (Miami)
- Genre: R&B
- Length: 5:01 (album version); 3:59 (radio edit and video version)
- Label: Columbia; Music World
- Songwriters: Beyoncé Knowles; Scott Storch; Robert Waller
- Producers: Beyoncé Knowles; Scott Storch

Beyoncé singles chronology
"Fighting Temptation" (2003)	"Me, Myself and I" (2003)	"Summertime" (2003)

Music video
- "Me, Myself and I" on YouTube

"Me, Myself and I" is a song by American singer Beyoncé from her debut solo album Dangerously in Love (2003). It was written by Beyoncé, Scott Storch and Robert Waller and produced by Storch with guitar played by Aaron Fishbein. Beyoncé decided that she wanted a deeper and more personal song as the third single; the song was sent by Columbia Records and Music World Entertainment to contemporary hit radio in the United States on October 19, 2003. "Me, Myself and I" is an R&B song about dealing with a philandering partner and learning from the consequences.

"Me, Myself and I" peaked at number four on the US Billboard Hot 100, becoming Beyoncé's fourth consecutive top-five single in the United States. It was certified gold by the Recording Industry Association of America (RIAA). The single reached the top twenty in Australia, the Netherlands, Scotland and the United Kingdom. The live performance of the song from The Beyoncé Experience Live was nominated for a Grammy Award for Best Female R&B Vocal Performance at the 51st Annual Grammy Awards in 2009, and the original version earned Beyoncé, Storch and Waller an ASCAP Pop Music Award.

Directed by Johan Renck, the accompanying music video premiered on December 10, 2003, and follows the plot of the song's theme and the events in the video are played in reverse. It would later be nominated in the Best R&B Video at the 2004 MTV Video Music Awards. "Me, Myself and I" was part of Beyoncé's set lists on the Dangerously in Love Tour (2003), Verizon Ladies First Tour (2004), The Beyoncé Experience (2007), the I Am... World Tour (2009–10) and The Formation World Tour (2016).

== Background and release ==
After the release of her former group Destiny's Child's third studio album Survivor (2001), Beyoncé worked on her debut solo studio album, Dangerously in Love. She stated that it was more personal than her previous records because she only had to write for herself. She contacted various musical collaborators, including Scott Storch and Robert Waller. The musical style of "Me, Myself and I" is different from the style of her previous singles; Beyoncé decided that she wanted a deeper and more personal song for the next single. Following the release of the song, Beyoncé told Corey Moss of MTV News: "['Me, Myself and I'] is really powerful. It talks about women basically listening to their inner voice and knowing that they will never disappoint themselves."

"Me, Myself and I" was the third single released from Dangerously in Love, which followed "Crazy in Love" featuring Jay-Z and "Baby Boy" featuring Sean Paul. It was sent to rhythmic contemporary and urban contemporary radio on October 19, 2003. A CD single was released on October 21, 2003, in the United States, which contained Junior Vasquez's dance radio mix of "Krazy in Luv" as its B-side. It officially impacted contemporary hit radio in the United States on November 12, 2003. On December 16, 2003, a 12-inch single was released in the United States. The single was released in selected European countries in January 2004, including Austria, Belgium, Ireland, the Netherlands, Sweden, and Switzerland.

"Me, Myself and I" was released in the United Kingdom as a maxi single on January 12, 2004, as two CD singles and a 12-inch vinyl single; the first disc included a radio edit of the song and "Dangerously in Love 2" (2003), and the second one contained two remixes of "Me, Myself and I"; one of the remixes, the "J'Ty" remix, features a sample of Lord Tariq and Peter Gunz' "Deja Vu (Uptown Baby)", which itself was based on an uncleared sample of Steely Dan's "Black Cow". In 2004, the single was also released in the United Kingdom on an enhanced CD that included videos of live performances of "Naughty Girl" (2003) and "Work It Out" (2002). In Canada, a CD single was released on December 30, 2003, featuring the album version and two remixes of the track. A CD single was released in Australia on January 16, 2004, which included the radio edit and three remixes of the track. The song was also released as a maxi single on January 19, 2004, and later as a three-track single in Germany.

== Composition ==
According to the sheet music published at Musicnotes.com by Alfred Music Publishing, "Me, Myself and I" is an R&B song performed in a moderately slow manner. It is written in the key of D♭ major; the tempo is set to eighty-four beats per minute, in common time. The chord follows the E♭m_{9}-Fm_{7}-G♭_{Maj7} keys, appearing every other bar, and the song has a string arrangement. According to Ryan Schreiber of Pitchfork Media, the song's instrumentation consists of a blending of funk keyboards, a slippery bass and minimal, programmed R&B percussion instruments.

"Me, Myself and I"
A sample of "Me, Myself and I", an R&B song, whose lyrics make reference to a girl who discovers that her love interest is cheating on her.

"Me, Myself and I" is " ... replete with strong woman lyrics about holding one's head up high after a traumatic break-up." The lyrics are constructed in the common verse-chorus form, each written in two stanzas. The song includes an intro and a bridge that appears between the second and final choruses. In an interview with Corey Moss of MTV News, Beyoncé explained the lyrical content of the song:

... [Me, Myself and I] basically talks about a girl who the guy's not right for her and he's cheating and whatever. And usually women feel stupid and silly and they blame themselves 'cause you have all the signs most of the time, but you love the guy so you don't want to see them go. And in this song, it's kind of like a celebration of the breakup ...

According to Neil Drumming of Entertainment Weekly, "Me, Myself and I" is similar to the Destiny's Child song "Say My Name" (2000), in terms of " ... its specificity and earnestness ... " and the way Beyoncé defends " ... her chastity [a]gainst some greedy boy ... ." This was echoed by James Poletti of Yahoo! Music who wrote that the song hints at what is to come as the warbling begins to move into overdrive on " ... a faintly sickly, if admirably slick, ode to that old Destiny's Child staple ... ", independence and self-belief in the face of a cheating man.

== Critical reception ==
Mark Anthony Neal of PopMatters said: "Beyoncé sounds assured" in her singing of the song and " ... lacking any of the 'shrill overboard' that describes some of the 'melisma fits' ... that marked earlier vocal efforts." Ryan Schreiber of Pitchfork Media noted the song as the "most notable 80s throwback" of the album, as its "augmented chords" call to mind Patti Austin and James Ingram's 1983 single "Baby, Come to Me" and Michael Jackson's 1983 single "Human Nature", or a decelerated version of "Baby Be Mine", from Jackson's 1982 album, Thriller. Neil Drumming of Entertainment Weekly said: Me, Myself, and I rides Storch's signature gangsta guitar, mellowed for Beyoncé's lovesick lament ... While reviewing Beyoncé second studio album, B'Day in 2006, Andy Kellman of AllMusic remarked that there are no songs with the " ... smooth elegance of 'Me, Myself and I'". Spence D., writing for IGN Music considered "Me, Myself and I" as a typical sounding R&B ballad with a familiar theme, and in which Beyoncé sings with passion.

=== Awards and nominations ===
At the 2005 American Society of Composers, Authors, and Publishers Pop Music Awards, Beyoncé received the Songwriter of the Year award, sharing it with Storch and Waller. It was recognized as Most Performed Song in 2005, alongside Beyoncé's "Baby Boy" and "Naughty Girl". Beyoncé's live version of "Me, Myself and I" from The Beyoncé Experience Live gained a nomination for Best Female R&B Vocal Performance at the 51st Annual Grammy Awards in 2009.

== Commercial performance ==
Following the release of "Me, Myself and I", the album ascended the US Billboard 200 chart and was certified as multi-platinum. On November 16, 2003, the single debuted on the Billboard Hot 100 at number 96, while "Baby Boy" was still at number one. 14 weeks after its debut, the single peaked at number 4 for two weeks, becoming the third consecutive top five release from Dangerously in Love and Beyoncé's fourth consecutive top five hit. "Me, Myself and I" remained on the Billboard Hot 100 chart for 24 weeks. On January 30, 2009, the single was certified gold by the Recording Industry Association of America (RIAA). By October 6, 2010, "Me, Myself and I" had sold 119,000 CD copies in the US.

The single was less successful internationally, peaking below the top 10. It reached number 11 in Australia and the UK, and the top 20 in the New Zealand and the Netherlands. It stayed in the UK Top 100 for seven weeks, and was the second shortest presence on a singles chart, after her 2009 duet with Lady Gaga on the extended remix version of "Video Phone".

== Music video ==
Following her first two videos with Jake Nava, Beyoncé hired Johan Renck to direct the music video for "Me, Myself and I". While premiering the video MTV's Total Request Live on December 10, 2003, Beyoncé described the video's conception,

The video and actually the song I wrote it for the ladies because I know sometimes we go through relationships and they don’t work out and we blame the guy or we blame the other girl or we blame ourselves. And we have this inner voice that kind of leads us in the right direction. We can always depend on ourself and the song 'Me, myself and I' and I wanted the video to reflect that. I was trying to think of something different, something fresh and new visually to do.

When some of the behind-the-scenes footage was used in a BET Access Granted special, some of the scenes that Beyoncé was shown shooting did not appear in the finished video. Beyoncé said that the video did not turn out the way she wanted it to be and she had to reshoot most of it. In post-production, she decided that it would be more artistic to play the events in reverse.

The footage follows the plot of the song's theme, in which Beyoncé deals with a cheating boyfriend when she finds his mistress' red panties. From the aftermath of the affair, Beyoncé discards her old possessions that remind her of her boyfriend (e.g. scratching his car). She goes back to the hotel, removes her jewelry and makeup and laments over her ex-boyfriend in the bathtub. As a result, Beyoncé cuts her hair short into a bob as she dresses up and goes out in her bare feet. The events in the video are played in reverse. Beyoncé said that this music video was the hardest video she had ever made. Philadelphia's Patrick DeMarco described the video as "sexy". In 2004, the video was nominated for Best R&B Video at the 2004 MTV Video Music Awards. In May 2010, an alternative version of the video was released; this does not show the events in reverse and includes some of the scenes that were not included in the first version.

== Live performances ==
During the Verizon Ladies First Tour which also featured Alicia Keys, Missy Elliott and Tamia, Beyoncé performed "Me, Myself and I" in New York City to an audience of over 20,000. Before singing, she told the audience that she was going to sing about "a relationship horror story". She pulled a pair of red panties out of her purse, saying that these were not hers but belonged to her cheating boyfriend's mistress. During the performance, Beyoncé held out the microphone for the audience's response, which was "is all I got in the end". She shouted that she wanted to hear everybody from front to back, and continued singing, then told the audience that she wrote the song for "each and every one of y'all!".

"Me, Myself and I" was also included on the set list of Beyoncé's Dangerously in Love World Tour that began in late 2003. During the tour, Beyoncé appeared suspended from the ceiling of the arena, and was lowered onto a red lounger. The song was performed as part of Beyoncé's The Beyoncé Experience in Los Angeles and her I Am... World Tour. On August 5, 2007, Beyoncé performed the song at the Madison Square Garden in Manhattan. Before the song, Beyoncé told the audience that it was very special to her and that she was going to perform a slower version. She was accompanied by her all-female band. Jon Pareles of The New York Times complimented the performance, stating: "Beyoncé needs no distractions from her singing, which can be airy or brassy, tearful or vicious, rapid-fire with staccato syllables or sustained in curlicued melismas. But she was in constant motion, strutting in costumes (most of them silvery), from miniskirts to formal dresses, flesh-toned bodysuit to bikini to negligee." Shaheem Reid of MTV News also praised the performance, and wrote: " ... For all the dancing she did, Beyoncé got an equally big — if not more resounding — response for displaying her undeniable vocal ability on the ballads like "Me, Myself and I". " The song was later included on a live recording of the tour, entitled The Beyoncé Experience Live (2007).

In Los Angeles, Beyoncé gave a full-length performance of "Me, Myself and I" without backup dancers and with limited live instrumentation. Beyoncé wore a green belly dancing costume. When Beyoncé performed the song in Sunrise, Florida on June 29, 2009, she wore a leotard. As she sang, animated graphics of turntables, faders and other club equipment were projected behind the dancers and musicians. Beyoncé was accompanied by two drummers, two keyboardists, a percussionist, a horn section, three imposing backup vocalists called the Mamas, bass guitarist Divinity Roxx and lead guitarist Bibi McGill.

In 2016, Beyonce included the song on the setlist of her The Formation World Tour, she sang it during the second act of the show and would often stop and talk to the crowd, speaking on the relationship she and the audience have with themselves. In 2018, she performed the song during her Coachella performance in a medley with her song "Sorry". She included the same performance on the first European shows during her co-headlining On the Run II tour with Jay-Z.

== Track listing and formats ==
- US 12-inch vinyl single
1. "Me, Myself and I" (album version) – 5:01
2. "Me, Myself and I" (Grizzly a cappella) – 4:32
3. "Me, Myself and I" (Grizzly Remix) – 4:32
4. "Me, Myself and I" (Bama Boys Sexy Remix) – 4:42
5. "Me, Myself and I" (Bama Boys Sexy Instrumental) – 4:42
6. "Me, Myself and I" (Grizzly Remix Instrumental) – 4:32
- US remixes
1. "Me, Myself and I" (Grizzly Remix featuring Ghostface Killah)
2. "Me, Myself and I" (J'Ty Remix featuring Grafh)
3. "Me, Myself and I" (J'Ty Remix [without rap])
4. "Me, Myself and I" (Bama Boys Sexy Remix)
5. "Me, Myself and I" (Eastern Delight Mix)
6. "Me, Myself and I" (J'Ty Remix [Acapella with rap])
7. "Me, Myself and I" ( J'Ty Remix [Instrumental])
- Europe CD single and United Kingdom CD single (Part 1)
1. "Me, Myself and I" (radio edit)
2. "Dangerously in Love" (Live from Headliners)
- United Kingdom CD single (Part 2)
1. "Me, Myself and I" (radio edit)
2. "Me, Myself and I" (Eastern Delight Mix)
- European maxi-single
1. "Me, Myself and I" (radio edit) – 3:58
2. "Me, Myself and I" (Eastern Delight Mix) – 4:25
3. "Me, Myself and I" (Bama Boys Sexy Remix) – 4:42
4. "Me, Myself and I" (Junior's Radio Mix) – 3:44
5. "Work It Out" (Live Video from Headliners) – 3:37 (enhanced video)
- Germany maxi single
1. "Me, Myself and I" (radio edit)
2. "Me, Myself and I" (album version)
3. "Me, Myself and I" (instrumental)
4. "Me, Myself and I" (a cappella)
- German Pock It CD (3-inch)
1. "Me, Myself and I" (radio edit) – 3:58
2. "Me, Myself and I" (Bama Boys Throwback Remix) – 3:58

== Charts ==
=== Weekly charts ===
Weekly chart performance for "Me, Myself and I"
Chart (2003–2004)	Peak position
Australia (ARIA)	11
Australia Urban (ARIA)	6
Austria (Ö3 Austria Top 40)	51
Belgium (Ultratop 50 Flanders)	49
Belgium (Ultratip Bubbling Under Wallonia)	7
Canada (Nielsen SoundScan)	7
European Hot 100 Singles (Billboard)	32
Germany (GfK)	35
Hungary (Dance Top 40)	15
Hungary (Editors' Choice Top 40)	18
Ireland (IRMA)	21
Italy (FIMI)	25
Netherlands (Dutch Top 40)	14
Netherlands (Single Top 100)	14
New Zealand (Recorded Music NZ)	18
Romania (Romanian Top 100)	93
Scottish Singles Sales (Official Charts)	18
Sweden (Sverigetopplistan)	43
Switzerland (Schweizer Hitparade)	41
UK Singles (Official Charts)	11
UK Hip Hop/R&B (Official Charts)	4
US Billboard Hot 100	4
US Dance Club Songs (Billboard)	3
US Hot R&B/Hip-Hop Songs (Billboard)	2
US Pop Airplay (Billboard)	18
US Rhythmic Airplay (Billboard)	8

=== Year-end charts ===
Year-end chart performance for "Me, Myself and I"
Chart (2004)	Position
UK Singles (OCC)	176
US Billboard Hot 100	26
US Hot R&B/Hip-Hop Singles & Tracks (Billboard)	8
US Mainstream Top 40 (Billboard)	77
US Rhythmic Top 40 (Billboard)	49

== Certifications ==
Certifications and sales for "Me, Myself and I"
Region	Certification	Certified units/sales
Australia (ARIA)	Platinum	70,000^{‡}
Canada (Music Canada)	Gold	40,000^{‡}
New Zealand (RMNZ)	Platinum	30,000^{‡}
United Kingdom (BPI)	Silver	200,000^{‡}
United States (RIAA)	2× Platinum	2,000,000^{‡}
United States (RIAA) Mastertone	Gold	500,000^{*}
^{*} Sales figures based on certification alone.^{‡} Sales+streaming figures based on certification alone.

== Release history ==
Release dates and formats for "Me, Myself and I"
Region	Date	Format(s)	Label(s)	Ref.
United States	October 19, 2003	Rhythmic contemporary radio; urban contemporary radio	Columbia	
United States	October 21, 2003	CD	Columbia; Music World	
United States	October 28, 2003	Digital download	Columbia; Music World	
United States	November 12, 2003	Contemporary hit radio	Columbia	
United States	January 6, 2004	12-inch vinyl	Columbia; Music World	
Germany	January 12, 2004	Digital download	Sony Music	
United Kingdom	January 12, 2004	12-inch vinyl; CD; maxi CD	Columbia	
Australia	January 16, 2004	Maxi CD	Sony Music	
Belgium	January 19, 2004	Digital download	Sony Music	
Germany	January 19, 2004	Maxi CD	Sony Music	
Denmark	February 16, 2004	Maxi CD	Columbia	
