= Dangerously in Love Tour =

2003 concert tour by Beyoncé

- Debut tour by Beyoncé
- Promotional poster for the tour
- Location: England; Scotland; Ireland; Northern Ireland; Netherlands
- Associated album: Dangerously in Love
- Start date: November 3, 2003
- End date: November 19, 2003
- Legs: 1
- No. of shows: 10
- Attendance: 100,000 (10 shows)
- Box office: $4 million ($5.25 million in 2025 dollars)

Beyoncé concert chronology
- Dangerously in Love Tour (2003); Verizon Ladies First Tour (2004)

The Dangerously in Love Tour was the debut concert tour by American singer Beyoncé. Although the tour was intended to showcase songs from her debut solo album, Dangerously in Love, (2003) the set list also contained a special segment dedicated to Beyoncé's girl group Destiny's Child and featured songs from her 2003 film The Fighting Temptations. The stage was simple and featured a large LED screen at the back that displayed video of Beyoncé and her dancers, as well as images from her music videos and prerecorded footage. The Dangerously in Love Tour only reached Europe, primarily the United Kingdom. Beyoncé's performance at the Wembley Arena in London was filmed and later released on the video album Live at Wembley (2004).

== Background and development ==
The Dangerously In Love Tour was the debut solo concert tour by American recording artist Beyoncé. The tour was intended to showcase songs from Beyoncé's debut solo album, Dangerously in Love released in 2003. However, the set list also contained a special segment of her show dedicated to her girl group Destiny's Child and songs from Beyoncé's 2003 film The Fighting Temptations ("Fever" and "Summertime"). The stage was simple and featured a large LED screen in the back that moved up and down throughout the entire show and displayed video images of Beyoncé and her dancers, as well as some images from her music videos and some prerecorded images with special effects. The show also featured a small staircase and platforms on both sides of the stairs for her band. Beyoncé later toured alongside Missy Elliott and Alicia Keys as ensemble for the Verizon Ladies First Tour (2004) in North America.

== Reception ==
Dave Simpson of The Guardian described the opening of the show during his review: "Some while after Beyoncé is due on stage, a voice announces that the support act won't be appearing and that Beyoncé will be with us 'in a moment'. Like everything else – hits, boots, hair, and sponsorship deals – moments are very big in Beyoncé's world. An age later, cheers erupt for the raising of a curtain which revealed, er, a roadie fiddling with a drum kit. An hour later, the piped music is getting gradually louder to drown boos and the cries of small children whose parents are moaning it's getting past their bedtime." The show opens with "Baby Boy" which Beyoncé sang while being lowered onto the stage upside down. A highlight for many fans was her performance of "Dangerously in Love 2". During the tour, a special 8-minutes rendition of the song was performed.

Simpson of The Guardian reviewed the opening show of the tour negatively, grading it with two out of five stars. He was negative about Beyoncé's clothing during the show, saying: "The delays may well be down to Beyoncé's wardrobe, which could trouble Imelda Marcos. There are skimpy skirts, tails (for a note, if pointless, version of Peggy Lee's 'Fever'), and a general theme of low material, high glitz. But often, the main sparkle is on Beyoncé's outfit." He also added that "The dancers' 'naked suits' make the former church girl a raunchy rival to Kylie [Minogue]. But there's an interminable section where they pretend to be homies, and when Beyoncé disappears for long periods it feels like an expensive night with Legs and Co." He concluded his review by saying,

"Clearly, the armies of industry professionals that put Beyoncé together aren't sure of her core audience. A vague Saturday night TV, family-entertainment feel gradually gives way to a more intriguing cross between Liza Minnelli's showbiz and thumping R&B. However, a ticker tape festooned 'Crazy in Love' and a belting 'Work It Out' suggest Beyoncé is best sticking to her roots. Bizarrely, if implausibly, she puts the carnage down to her tour manager falling off stage, but at least she's grasped one showbiz adage: the show must go on."

== Broadcasts and recordings ==
On November 10, 2003, Beyoncé performed at the Wembley Arena in London; the show was later released on DVD as Live at Wembley, which was released in April 2004. It was accompanied by a CD comprising three previously unreleased studio recorded songs and one remix each of "Crazy in Love", "Baby Boy" and "Naughty Girl". Behind-the-scenes footage can be also seen on the DVD. The album debuted at number seventeen on the Billboard 200, selling 45,000 copies in its first week. The DVD has been certified double platinum by the Recording Industry Association of America for shipping 200,000 copies. According to Nielsen SoundScan, it had sold 264,000 copies in the US by October 2007, while as at October 6, 2010, it had sold 197,000 digital downloads. In an interview with The New York Times in 2007, American singer Miranda Lambert revealed that Live at Wembley inspired her to "take little bits from that [Beyoncé performance]" for her live shows.

== Setlist ==
1. "Baby Boy"
2. "Naughty Girl"
3. "Fever"
4. "Hip Hop Star"
5. "Yes"
6. "Work It Out"
7. "Gift from Virgo"
8. "Be with You"
9. "Speechless"
10. "Bug a Boo" / "No, No, No Part 2" / "Bootylicious" / "Jumpin', Jumpin'" / "Say My Name" / "Independent Women Part I" / "'03 Bonnie & Clyde" / "Survivor"
11. "Me, Myself and I"
12. "Summertime"
13. "Dangerously in Love 2"

Encore

14. "Crazy in Love"

== Tour dates ==
List of European concerts, showing date, city, country and venue
| Date (2003) | City | Country | Venue |
|---|---|---|---|
| November 3 | Manchester | England | Manchester Evening News Arena |
| November 4 | Glasgow | Scotland | Braehead Arena |
| November 7 | Sheffield | England | Hallam FM Arena |
| November 9 | Newcastle | England | Metro Radio Arena |
| November 10 | London | England | Wembley Arena |
| November 11 | London | England | Wembley Arena |
| November 13 | Birmingham | England | National Indoor Arena |
| November 14 | Belfast | Northern Ireland | Odyssey Arena |
| November 15 | Dublin | Ireland | Point Theatre |
| November 19 | Amsterdam | Netherlands | Heineken Music Hall |

== Personnel ==
- Beyoncé – creation
- Sharon Ali – producer, video producer
- Bill Ashworth – camera operator
- Peter Barnes – lighting design
- Alan Beechey – lighting technician
- Ahmet Bekir – camera operator
- Angela Beyincé – personal assistant
- John Blow – editing
- Daniel Boland – lighting director
- Charlie Bryan – camera operator
- Lenora Dee Bryant – wardrobe
- William Burke – Pro-Tools
- Kim Burse – creation, creative director
- Alice Butts – package design
- Thom Cadley – mixing, surround sound
- Rick Camp – engineer

Matt Cashman – camera operator

- Justin Collie – lighting director
- Mike Colucci – set construction
- Annie Crofts – liner note producer
- Mark Cruickshank – camera operator
- Mark Davies – camera operator
- Ceire Deery – production coordination
- DJ Diamond – DJ
- Richard Ellis – camera operator
- Alan Floyd – tour manager
- Michael Garabedian – set construction
- Frank Gatson Jr. – choreographer, creation, staging
- Danielle Green – production coordination
- Tim Highmoor – camera operator
- Chris Hollier – camera operator
- Adrian Homeshaw – camera operator
- Tyrone"Ty" Hunter – assistant hair stylist, stylistic advisor
- Chris Issacson – technician
- Ed Jarman – video engineer
- Paul Jarvis – camera operator
- Scott Jenkins – camera operator
- Harold Jones – production coordination
- Pete Jones – sound recording
- Chris Keating – video director
- Julia Knowles – director, producer
- Mathew Knowles – executive producer
- Tina Knowles – stylist
- Casper Leaver – camera operator
- Jim Littlehayles – camera operator
- Sophie Lote – production coordination
- Carl Lott – drum technician, guitar technician
- Darragh McAuliffe – lighting technician
- James "McGoo" McGregor – DJ, drum technician
- Neil McLintock – camera operator
- Nahum – director, editing
- Kenneth Nash – monitor engineer
- Naomi Neufeld – technical director
- Vincent Perreux – sound technician
- Arthur Ross – camera operator
- Mark Scott – engineer, sound recording
- Rod Spicer – photography
- Tim Summerhayes – audio supervisor
- Horace Ward – engineer
- Mark Wilder – mastering

=== Band ===
- Lanar Brantley – bass, music director
- Shawn Carrington – guitar
- Gerald Heyward – drums
- Daniel Weatherspoon – keyboards
- Joe "Flip" Wilson – keyboards

=== Dancers ===
- Zakari Asher – dancer
- Carmit Bachar – dancer
- Anthony Burrell – dance director, dancer
- Anwar Burton or "Flli" – dancer
- Milan Dillard – dancer
- Renece Fincher – dancer
- Aisha Francis – dance director, dancer
- Brandon Henchel – dancer
- Melanie Lewis-Yribar – dancer
