= Work It Out (Beyoncé song) =

2002 single by Beyoncé

Single by Beyoncé

from the album Austin Powers in Goldmember: Music from the Motion Picture
- Released: June 11, 2002
- Recorded: March 2002
- Studio: The Record Plant (Los Angeles, CA); Sunrise Studios (Houston, TX)
- Genre: Funk; R&B
- Length: 4:06
- Label: Columbia
- Songwriters: Beyoncé Knowles; Pharrell Williams; Chad Hugo
- Producer: The Neptunes

Beyoncé singles chronology
| "I Got That" (2000) | "Work It Out" (2002) | "'03 Bonnie & Clyde" (2002) |

Music video
- "Work It Out" on YouTube

"Work It Out" is the debut solo single by American singer Beyoncé. It was released on June 11, 2002, by Columbia Records as the lead single from the soundtrack album to the film Austin Powers in Goldmember, in which Beyoncé stars as Foxxy Cleopatra. It was later included on international editions of Beyoncé's debut studio album, Dangerously in Love (2003). Beyoncé co-wrote the song with its producers, Pharrell Williams and Chad Hugo. "Work It Out" is an R&B song which incorporates elements of 1960s and 1970s funk and post-disco.

The song was generally well received by music critics, many of whom complimented its retro style and various influences. It has been credited as the beginning of Beyoncé's career as a successful solo artist, after finding success as the lead singer of Destiny's Child. "Work It Out" was nominated in the category of Best Original or Adapted Song at the 2003 Black Reel Awards. Commercially, the song failed to make an impact on the US Billboard Hot 100 but managed to find success on a few Billboard component charts, topping the Billboard's Hot Dance Club Play chart. "Work It Out" also reached the top ten in Norway and the UK.

The song's accompanying music video was shot and directed by Matthew Rolston. The video features Beyoncé playing Foxxy Cleopatra, and draws inspiration from several 1960s and 1970s motifs. The video was nominated at the MTV Video Music Awards Japan in the category Best Video from a Film. "Work It Out" has been parodied and covered on several live television programs, including American Idol and America's Best Dance Crew. Since its release, the song has been included on several of Beyoncé's tours and concerts.

== Background and release ==
In the 2002 film Austin Powers in Goldmember, Beyoncé portrays Foxxy Cleopatra, the female protagonist alongside the film's lead character, Austin Powers, portrayed by Canadian film actor and comedian Mike Myers. Cleopatra is a parody of the characters in blaxploitation films such as Foxy Brown and Cleopatra Jones, both of which are used in her name. Her clothing style is reminiscent of the disco era and her hair is in the afro style of the time. Taking inspiration from her portrayal, Beyoncé adopted in the song a persona similar to that of Cleopatra. Cleopatra and police officer Get Christie Love! use the slang term "sugar", which Beyoncé ad-libs and incorporates into the song. Many similarities are seen as she performs under her Cleopatra persona in the music video of "Work It Out". Due to the characters' sassy nature, Beyoncé performs the song very confidently and assertively. Powers meets Cleopatra at the villain's discothèque in 1975, which attributes to Cleopatra's disco-type fashion and the heavily inspired disco-era music video for "Work It Out".

"Work It Out" was written by Beyoncé, Pharrell Williams, and Chad Hugo, and produced by the latter two. Critically, the song was credited with marking Beyoncé's transition into the music scene as a solo artist, after fulfilling a career as the lead female vocalist of Destiny's Child. Beyoncé premiered the song on May 23, 2002, via AOL. The song served as the first single from the soundtrack album, Austin Powers: Goldmember, with Britney Spears' "Boys" following as the soundtrack's second single. Additionally, it serves as the album's opening track, and was released on June 11, 2002. "Work It Out" was also intended to serve as the lead single from Beyoncé's debut album, Dangerously in Love. However, it was eventually replaced by "Crazy in Love", while it was used as a bonus song on the album's international versions.

== Composition ==
"Work It Out"
A 24-second sample of "Work It Out", which features musical elements of the 1970s funk.

According to the sheet music published at Musicnotes.com by Hal Leonard Corporation, "Work It Out" is a moderately paced R&B, soul, and funk song. Written in the key of G major, it has a moderately slow tempo of 84 beats per minute and incorporates elements of post-disco. The song has been viewed as reminiscent of 1960s and 1970s funk and soul music, with Craig Seymour of Entertainment Weekly describing the tune as a "retro-thumper". Rob Fitzpatrick of NME commented that the song features "super-heavy funk", and is "an absolutely faultless attempt to re-create on classics by The J.B.'s and Lynn Anderson", while Nick Duerden of Spin magazine described the song as a "stunning '[19]60s soul vamp." Duerden and John Mulvey of New Musical Express recognized that The Neptunes paid tribute to James Brown within the song. While making a reference to the fact that the song contains various elements of 1960s and 1970s musical styles, Sal Cinquemani of Slant Magazine stated that "Work It Out" positioned Beyoncé as "an MTV generation Tina Turner". Spin echoed Cinquemani's sentiments by describing Beyoncé as "gritty and sultry", referencing Tina Turner. Beyoncé has additionally been described as "a 'Rock Steady'-era Aretha Franklin" because of the way she "ambitiously grunts, wails, and moans" on "Work It Out".

== Critical reception ==
"Work It Out" garnered generally positive reviews from critics, most of whom complemented the 1960s and 1970s funk tone featured on the song. While reviewing the Austin Powers in Goldmember's soundtrack album, Josh Tyrangiel, writing for Entertainment Weekly, gave the song a negative review stating that it was "all shimmy and innuendo". However, while reviewing the single, Craig Seymour of the same publication awarded the song a grade of an A−, calling the track a "funky debut solo tune" and further stating that the song also proves that Beyoncé, best known "for riding poppy staccato beats, can get deep into a groove". Mark Anthony Neal of PopMatters recognized the success of Destiny's Child and credited it to Beyoncé, stating, "[Beyoncé], first stepped out on the solo trip in support of her role as Foxxy Cleopatra in Austin Powers: Gold Member." "Work It Out" indicated to Neal that Beyoncé was "ready to shed the 'but I'm still not yet a woman' vibe that's earned Destiny's Child multi-platinum status."

The song was considered a "good moment" on the film's soundtrack album by AllMusic's writer Stephen Thomas Erlewine. Erlewine called it "excellent" and favored it over the tracks of Survivor (2001), Destiny's Child's previous album. Although considered a great transition for Beyoncé, Vibe disagreed, stating that the song debuted a tepid beginning for Beyoncé, who had high anticipations for a solo-career. Contactmusic.com named the contributions by Beyoncé on the movie's soundtrack as a highlight of the album. Rob Boss of Walmart called Beyoncé "alluring" while reviewing her performance on the soundtrack and comparing it to her performance in the movie itself. Dismissing Beyoncé's acting by stating "she should stick to singing and leave the acting to the actors," Boss called her performance on the song intense and stated that the opening track "Work It Out" was a reason enough to include Beyoncé in the film. Rob Fitzpatrick of New Musical Express gave the song a mixed to positive review, writing that it sounds not only like a perfect imitation or replication of classic funk, but also like a derivation of various other sources and motifs. John Mulvey, writing for the same magazine, considered "Work It Out" to be the best tune Beyoncé had recorded since "Say My Name" (2000), and he further commented, "it's Beyoncé yowling, testifying and wigging out in only slightly-studied retro fashion that's most striking."

Spin magazine included the song on two separate lists of admiration. The first was a playlist of songs that "you need to know", and "Work It Out" was placed at number five for songs to download. The other list included the song on a list of "must-have Beyoncé songs". In addition to being included on lists, Vibe magazine included the song on a "Vibraters" list which named a number of songs that were on Vibe-staff's current playlists and stated the song was "her true destiny". Yancey Strickler of Flak Magazine wrote that in "Work It Out", Beyoncé sounds like Pam Grier "taking five from the revolution to let her afro down. Loose and funky (apologies for the overused terminology there, but 'Work It Out' practically defines it), the tune was Beyoncé declaring, 'I am woman, hear you drool.' Self-assured and immune to any of that tired old guff, she's out-of-Huey-Newton's-league untouchable." Following the song's 2002 release, it was included during many post-2003 award ceremonies. During the 2003 Black Reel Awards, the song was nominated in the category Best Original or Adapted Song. However, the song lost to Erykah Badu and Common's "Love of My Life (Ode to Hip-Hop)" from the film Brown Sugar.

== Commercial performance ==
"Work It Out" failed to enter the US Billboard Hot 100. "Work It Out" peaked atop the US Dance Club Play chart and experienced moderate commercial success throughout Europe. It debuted and peaked at number seven on the UK Singles Chart on July 27, 2002, charting for a total of 11 weeks. The song managed to peak within the top 20 of several European charts, peaking at number three in Norway, number 12 in Ireland and number 14 in Denmark. In Oceania, the single peaked at number 36 in New Zealand on September 8, 2002, while reaching number 23 for two consecutive weeks in late September 2002 in Australia.

== Music video ==
The accompanying music video for the song was directed by Matthew Rolston. Shot in New York City in early June 2002, behind-the-scenes footage of the shooting of the music video was released on June 7, and the main video officially posted on MTV on June 17. In the video, Jeremiah Alexis takes on the role of the bassist in the background and Beyoncé singing up-front, with the overall feel inspired by 1970s glamor and the introduction of pop and funk. On the concept of the video, Beyoncé said, "I wanted it to look different from what we've done. I wanted it to be raw. The look of it is like an old 1970's show." Rolston stated that the video was inspired by shows like Sonny & Cher and The Midnight Special with James Brown, which took place around the beginning of the disco era and the end of the hippy era.

The video begins with Beyoncé (as Cleopatra) sitting with Powers in a movie theater, a credit to the ending of Austin Powers in Goldmember. As the "movie" starts, Beyoncé is seen on stage performing with a band playing instruments to the song. After performing a simple choreography, Beyoncé begins her verse by singing into a microphone that has her name written on it with sparkles, with the scenery of the shot being a stage with a colorful background, and scenes from Goldmember pieced throughout the video. Beyoncé performs in a cube with disco-scenery shown on the walls, ceiling, and projected onto Beyoncé, who plays with hula hoops while wearing "Virgo" bedazzled jeans throughout the video. As the video ends, Beyoncé is seen back on the beginning stage performing a dance-routine with three backup dancers; the video ending with the movie theater cheering for the video, while Cleopatra and Powers smile at each other.

Cynthia Fuchs of PopMatters reviewed the music video, stating: "The video offers up a standard-seeming series of body parts—eye, navel, huge hair—but at the same time emphasizes Beyoncé's frankly awesome power, recalling Aretha and especially Tina Turner as she snuggles up to the mic stand, her ferocious thighs revealed beneath a sequined miniskirt. In her first solo effort, Beyoncé declares herself a singular personality, a body, and a performer. Not to mention a sensation with a hula-hoop." Fuchs added to her comment about Beyoncé's hoola-hooping skills, referring to them as "sensational" and stated that it gave the video "a giddy, gorgeous turn". Tamar Anitai of MTV News negatively reviewed Beyoncé's choice in hair-style as "two-tone, too-tight curls". In 2003, the music video was nominated at the MTV Video Music Awards Japan in the category Best Video from a Film. It eventually lost to Eminem's "Lose Yourself" from the film 8 Mile.

== Live performances ==
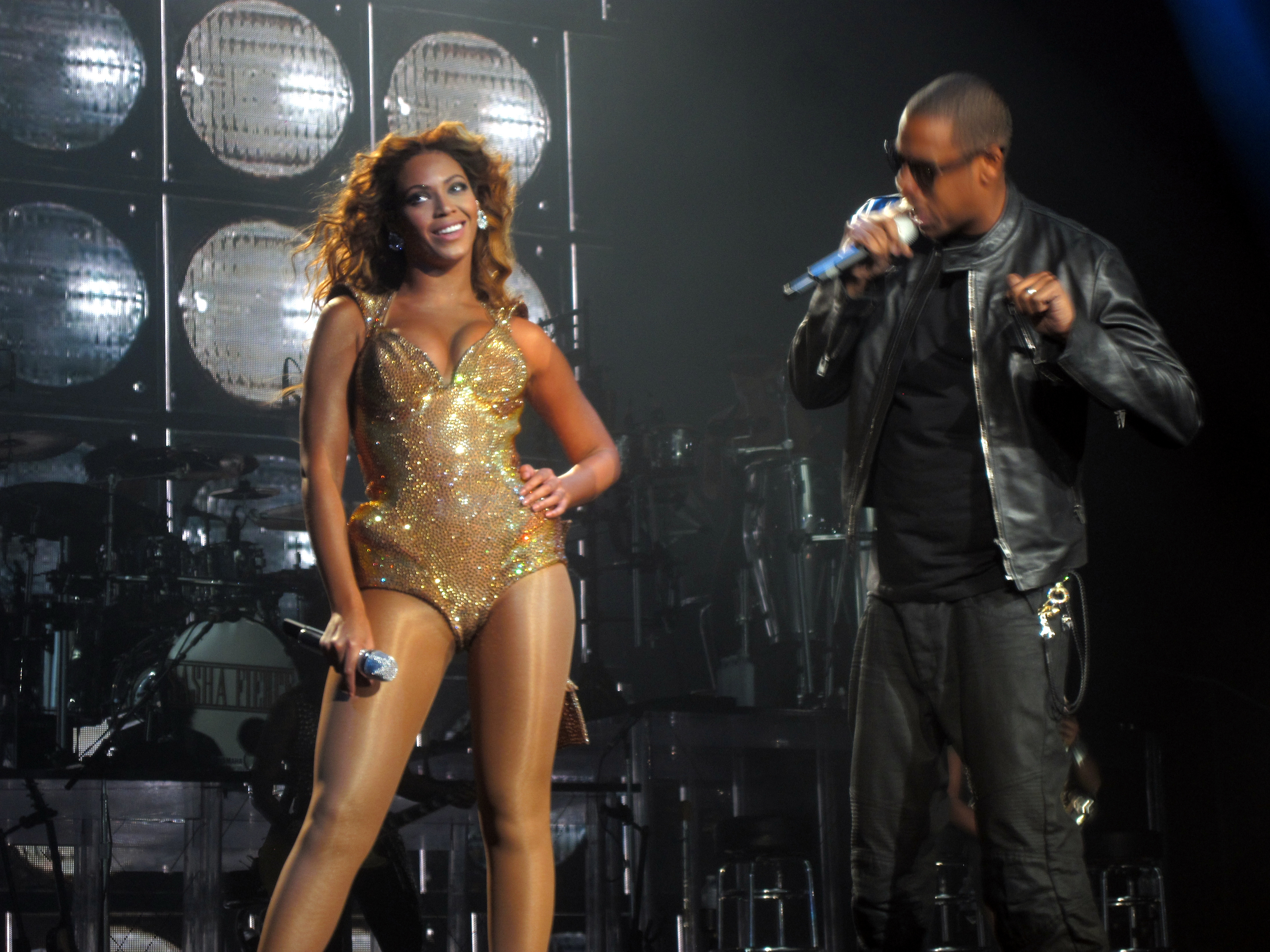
Beyoncé performing "Crazy in Love" with her husband Jay-Z during the I Am... World Tour, as a part of a medley with "Work It Out".

Beyoncé performed the song on multiple occasions, including the song as part of her set list on the Dangerously in Love Tour, where the performance of the song was recorded and distributed at the Wembley Arena in London for her Live at Wembley live and video album. The song was also performed live at the Wynn Theatre in Las Vegas on August 2, 2009, at the I Am... Yours concert, the performance was later recorded as well as distributed in a DVD/CD package entitled I Am... Yours: An Intimate Performance at Wynn Las Vegas on November 23, 2009. During the I Am... World Tour, the song was performed in a medley with "Crazy in Love", "I Just Wanna Love U (Give It 2 Me)", "Let Me Clear My Throat", and "Pass the Peas".

Beyoncé additionally performed the song on many televised appearances. The first televised performance of the song was on New Year's Eve at Nikki Beach, St. Barth. Other televised performances included Rove, 2003's Party in the Park, and Top of the Pops. Reviewing concert performances of the song, Mimi Valdés of Vibe called Beyoncé possessed, stating: "Tossing her head around, jerking her body, twirling the microphone stand, she's a new-millennium version of Tina Turner. As human and humble as she is off stage, watching her perform is a quick reminder of why she's a star. She's magnetic."

== Cover versions ==
The Los Angeles-based band Vitamin String Quartet, paid tribute to Beyoncé by doing their own version of "Work It Out" and adding it to their 2003 album, The String Quartet Tribute to Beyoncé. According to Tim Sendra of AllMusic, their version has more than four instruments on it as do most of the tracks, making it "more of a symphonic tribute to Beyoncé". The song has been performed by many reality television shows, which later led to the group or person winning that current challenge. On the fifth season of American Idol, contestant Paris Ana'is Bennett performed the song on March 28, 2006, in which the theme was to perform songs from the past six years. The song later allowed Bennett to pass through to the next round, with judge Randy Jackson stating it was the best of the night, Paula Abdul calling the performance "awesome", and Cowell naming the performance "overly precocious".

During the second week of the fourth season of America's Best Dance Crew, the Massive Monkees were asked to perform the song with the challenge to "dance with hula hoops without accidentally dropping them". The performance later allowed the group to move on to the next round, with judges Lil Mama stating that the group performed with a lot of "charisma"; however, JC Chasez negatively reviewed the performance as "elementary". While searching for an all-female band to accompany her on The Beyoncé Experience, Beyoncé had the candidates perform the single "Work It Out" as a test. An author called Skyy additionally referenced the song in a book of collected short-stories titled "Choices".

== Track listings ==
- Japanese CD single
1. "Work It Out" (Album Version) – 4:07
2. "Work It Out" (Maurice's Nu Soul Mix) – 7:11
- UK CD single
1. "Work It Out" (Radio Edit) – 3:43
2. "Work It Out" (Victor Calderone's Blow Your Horn Dub) – 9:57
3. "Work It Out" (Azza's Nu Soul Mix)
- UK 12" maxi single
1. "Work It Out" (Album Version) – 4:07
2. "Work It Out" (Radio Edit) – 3:22
3. "Work It Out" (Instrumental) – 4:07
- UK 12" single
1. "Work It Out" (Maurice's Nu Soul Mix) – 7:11
2. "Work It Out" (RC Groove Nu Electric Mix) – 5;23
3. "Work It Out" (Azza's Nu Soul Mix) – 4:50
- US 12" single
1. "Work It Out" (Maurice's Nu Soul Mix) – 7:11
2. "Work It Out" (Charlie's Nu NRG Mix) – 7:43
3. "Work It Out" (Victor Calderone's Blow Your Horn Dub) – 9:57
4. "Work It Out" (Bonus Beats) – 6:06
- Australia and New Zealand CD single
1. "Work It Out" (Radio Edit) – 3:22
2. "Work It Out" (Maurice's Nu Soul Mix) – 7:11
3. "Work It Out" (Charlie's Nu NRG Mix) – 7:43
4. "Work It Out" (H&D Nu Rock Mix)
- UK 12" maxi single
1. "Work It Out" (Album Version) – 4:07
2. "Work It Out" (Azza's Nu Soul Mix) – 4:50
3. "Work It Out" (Maurice's Nu Soul Mix) – 7:11
- US 12" single EP
1. "Work It Out" (Album Version) – 4:07
2. "Work It Out" (Rockwilder Remix) – 4:39
3. "Work It Out" (Rockwilder Remix Instrumental) – 4:00
4. "Work It Out" (The D. Elliot Remix)
5. "Work It Out" (The D. Elliot Remix Instrumental)
6. "Work It Out" (T. Gray Remix)
- Europe and German CD single
1. "Work It Out" (New Radio Edit) – 3:43
2. "Work It Out" (Blow Your Horn Dub) – 9:57
3. "Work It Out" (Azza's Nu Soul Mix) – 4:50
4. "Work It Out" (Maurice's Nu Soul Mix) – 7:11
- UK cassette single
1. "Work It Out" (Album Version) - 4:07
2. "Work It Out" (RC Groove Nu Electric Mix) - 5:23

== Credits and personnel ==
Credits adapted from the liner notes of the CD single.

- Beyoncé Knowles – additional vocal production, songwriting, vocals
- Cédric Courtois – engineering
- Brian Garten – engineering
- Serban Ghenea – mixing
- Chad Hugo – production
- Ramon Morales – engineering
- Pat Viala – mixing
- Pharrell Williams – production, songwriting

== Charts ==
=== Weekly charts ===
Weekly chart performance for "Work It Out"
| Chart (2002) | Peak position |
|---|---|
| Australia (ARIA) | 21 |
| Australian Urban (ARIA) | 5 |
| Belgium (Ultratip Bubbling Under Flanders) | 2 |
| Belgium (Ultratop 50 Wallonia) | 40 |
| Denmark (Tracklisten) | 14 |
| Europe (Eurochart Hot 100) | 36 |
| France (SNEP) | 87 |
| Germany (GfK) | 75 |
| Ireland (IRMA) | 12 |
| Netherlands (Dutch Top 40) | 30 |
| Netherlands (Single Top 100) | 26 |
| New Zealand (Recorded Music NZ) | 36 |
| Norway (VG-lista) | 3 |
| Scottish Singles Sales (Official Charts) | 6 |
| Sweden (Sverigetopplistan) | 23 |
| Switzerland (Schweizer Hitparade) | 48 |
| UK Singles (Official Charts) | 7 |
| UK Hip Hop/R&B (Official Charts) | 2 |
| US Dance Club Songs (Billboard) Victor Calderone & Maurice Joshua Mixes | 11 |

| Chart (2012) | Peak position |
|---|---|
| South Korea International (Circle) | 90 |

=== Year-end charts ===
Year-end chart performance for "Work It Out"
| Chart (2002) | Position |
|---|---|
| UK Singles (OCC) | 121 |
| UK Urban (Music Week) | 37 |

== Certifications ==
Certifications and sales for "Work It Out"
| Region | Certification | Certified units/sales |
|---|---|---|
| Australia (ARIA) | Gold | 35,000^{^} |
| Norway (IFPI Norway) | Gold | 5,000^{*} |
^{*} Sales figures based on certification alone.^{^} Shipments figures based on certification alone.

== Release history ==
Release dates and formats for "Work It Out"
| Region | Date | Format(s) | Label(s) | Ref. |
|---|---|---|---|---|
| United States | June 17, 2002 | Urban contemporary radio | Columbia | |
| United States | June 18, 2002 | Rhythmic contemporary radio | Columbia | |
| United States | June 25, 2002 | Contemporary hit radio | Columbia | |
| France | July 8, 2002 | Maxi CD | Columbia | |
| Japan | July 10, 2002 | CD | Sony Music Japan | |
| United Kingdom | July 15, 2002 | 12-inch vinyl; cassette; maxi CD | Columbia | |
| Denmark | July 22, 2002 | CD | Sony Music | |
| Australia | July 29, 2002 | Maxi CD | Sony Music | |
| Germany | August 12, 2002 | Maxi CD | Sony Music | |
