= The Fighting Temptations (soundtrack) =

The Fighting Temptations (Music from the Motion Picture)

Soundtrack album by Various artists
- Released: September 9, 2003
- Recorded: 2002–2003
- Studio: Sony Music Studios and Daddy's House Recordings NYC (New York, New York); Larrabee Sound Studios, Embassy Studios and The Village Recorder (Los Angeles, California); The Enterprise (Burbank); Music World Studios and 7303 Studios (Houston); Doppler Studios (Atlanta, Georgia)
- Genre: Hip-hop; gospel; R&B; neo soul
- Length: 54:44
- Label: Music World; Columbia Records; Sony Music
- Producer: Missy Elliott; Soul Diggaz; Beyoncé; Jimmy Jam and Terry Lewis; James "Big Jim" Wright; Rex Rideout; Loretha Jones; Bubba Smith; Buster & Shavoni; Solange Knowles; Derek "Grizz" Edwards; Damon Elliott; Sean Combs; Stevie J; Mario Winans; Mathew Knowles

Singles from The Fighting Temptations (Music from the Motion Picture)
- 1. "Fighting Temptation" Released: August 18, 2003; 2. "Summertime" Released: October 28, 2003

The Fighting Temptations (Music from the Motion Picture) is a soundtrack album for the 2003 film The Fighting Temptations, released by Music World, Columbia Records and Sony Music on September 9, 2003.

The soundtrack received generally positive reviews and proved to be more successful than the film itself. Only one song from the album, "Summertime", is not included in the movie. The song "Come Back Home" appears in the film, but was not included on the soundtrack album. Several other songs performed during the movie, including "Church Is in Mourning (Aunt Sally's Funeral Tribute)" by Shirley Caesar, "Won't Ever Change" by Mary Mary, "Waiting" by Ramiyah, and "Soldier" by The Blind Boys of Alabama, were also not included on the soundtrack.

== Track listing ==
Standard edition
No.	Title	Writer(s)	Producer(s)	Length
1.	"Fighting Temptation" (Beyoncé, Missy Elliott, MC Lyte & Free)	Melissa Elliott; LaShaun Owens; Karriem Mack; Lana Moorer; Marie Wright; Jonathan Burks; Walter Murphy; Gene Pistilli	Missy Elliott; Soul Diggaz	3:51
2.	"I Know" (Destiny's Child)	Beyonce Knowles; Jully Black; Owens; Mack; Corte Ellis	Beyoncé; Soul Diggaz	3:43
3.	"Rain Down" (Eddie Levert & Angie Stone)	Rex Rideout; David Harper; Terri Harper	Rex Rideout; Loretha Jones	3:27
4.	"To Da River" (T-Bone, Lil Zane, & Montell Jordan)	Louis Brown; Scott Parker	Buster & Shavoni	4:12
5.	"I'm Getting Ready" (Ann Nesby)	Shirley Caesar	Bubba Smith	3:15
6.	"The Stone" (Ann Nesby & Shirley Caesar)	Caesar	Bubba Smith	1:53
7.	"Heaven Knows" (Faith Evans)	Pete Bellotte; Giorgio Moroder; Donna Summer; Mathieson Gregory Richard	Jimmy Jam and Terry Lewis; James "Big Jim" Wright	5:43
8.	"Fever" (Beyoncé)	John Davenport; Eddie Cooley; Peggy Lee (uncredited)	Beyoncé; Damon Elliott	4:32
9.	"Everything I Do" (Beyoncé & Bilal)	James Harris III; Terry Lewis; J. Wright	Jam and Lewis; Wright	4:22
10.	"Loves Me Like a Rock" (The O'Jays)	Paul Simon	Bubba Smith	2:26
11.	"Swing Low, Sweet Chariot" (Beyoncé)	Wallace Willis	B. Knowles; Jones	2:05
12.	"He Still Loves Me" (Beyoncé & Walter Williams Sr.)	Harris III; Lewis; J. Wright	Jam and Lewis; Wright	4:22
13.	"Time To Come Home" (Beyoncé, Angie Stone & Melba Moore)	B. Knowles; Harris III; Lewis; J. Wright	Jam and Lewis; Wright	3:52
14.	"Don't Fight the Feeling" (Solange Knowles & Papa Reu)	Solange Knowles; Pharrell Williams; Rueben Nero; Derek Edwards	Solange; Derek "Grizz" Edwards	3:07
15.	"Summertime" (Beyoncé & Diddy)	B. Knowles; Angela Beyincé; Adonis Shropshire; Sean Combs; Varick Smith; Mario Winans; Steven Jordan	Diddy; Mario Winans; Steven Jordan	3:54
Total length:				54:44

== Personnel ==
Credits adapted from Apple Music, Discogs, and Spotify.

- Beyoncé - Featured Artist (1, 8–9, 11–13, 15)
- Missy Elliott - Featured Artist (1)
- MC Lyte - Featured Artist (1)
- Free - Featured Artist (1)
- Destiny's Child - Featured Artist (2)
- Eddie Levert - Featured Artist (3)
- Angie Stone - Featured Artist (3, 13)
- T-Bone - Featured Artist (4)
- Lil Zane - Featured Artist (4)
- Montell Jordan - Featured Artist (4)
- Ann Nesby - Featured Artist (5–6)
- Shirley Caesar - Featured Artist (6)
- Faith Evans - Featured Artist (7)
- Bilal - Featured Artist (9)
- The O'Jays - Featured Artist (10)
- Walter Williams Sr. - Featured Artist (12)
- Melba Moore - Featured Artist (13)
- Solange Knowles - Featured Artist (14)
- Papa Reu - Featured Artist (14)
- Diddy - Featured Artist (15)
- Mathew Knowles - Executive Producer
- Jimmy Jam and Terry Lewis - Executive Producer
- James "Big Jim" Wright - Executive Producer
- Spring Aspers - Co-executive Music Producer
- Missy Elliott - Producer (1)
- Soul Diggaz - Producer (1–2)
- Beyoncé - Producer (2, 8, 11), Vocal Producer (1, 15)
- Rex Rideout - Producer (3)
- Loretha Jones - Producer (3, 11)
- Buster & Shavoni - Producer (4)
- Bubba Smith - Producer (5–6, 10)
- Jimmy Jam and Terry Lewis - Producer (7, 9, 12–13)
- James "Big Jim" Wright - Producer (7, 9, 12–13)
- Damon Elliott - Producer - (8)
- Solange Knowles - Producer (14), Vocal Producer (14)
- Derek "Grizz" Edwards - Producer (14)
- Diddy - Producer (15)
- Mario Winans - Producer (15)
- Stevie J - Producer (15)
- Dave Pensado - Mixing Engineer (2, 8)
- Jim Caruana - Recording Engineer (2)
- Manny Marroquin - Mixing Engineer (3–6, 8, 10–11)
- Ken Fambro - DJ (4)
- Faith Evans - Background Vocals (7)
- James "Big Jim" Wright - Keyboards (7, 9), Background Vocals (7)
- Beyoncé - Background Vocals (9)
- Debra Killings - Background Vocals (9)
- Issiah "Iz" Avila - Drums (7, 9, 12), Percussion (9,12)
- Bobby Ross Avila - Keyboards (7, 12), Bass (12)
- Jimmy "Z" Zavala - Saxophone (7)
- Alex "Godson" Richbourg - Programming (7,9)
- Matt Marrin - Engineer (7, 9)
- Jeff Penn - Assistant Engineer (7, 9)
- Neal Pogue - Mixing Engineer (7, 9, 13)
- Jeff Robinette - Mixing Engineer (7), Assistant Engineer (9)
- Blake Eiseman - Recording Engineer (7, 9, 12–13)
- Weyburn Dean - Arranger (11)
- Keith Lancaster - Arranger (11)
- Steven Jordan - Guitar (15)
- Paul Logus - Guitar (15), Mixing Engineer (15)
- Lynn Montrose - Assistant Engineer (15)
- Alexis Seaton - Assistant Engineer (15)
- Roger Che - Recording Engineer (15)
- Teresa LaBarbera Whites - A&R Direction
- Alvin Williams - A&R Direction
- Kim Burse - A&R Direction
- Huy Nguyen - A&R Co-ordination For Music World
- Michael Lau-Robles - Design
- Hooshik Bayliss - Art Direction

== Certifications ==
Region	Certification	Certified units/sales
United States (RIAA)	Gold	500,000^{^}
^{^} Shipments figures based on certification alone.

== Awards and nominations ==
At Black Reel Awards, the album won "Best Film Soundtrack" and the Beyoncé and Walter Williams Sr. duet "He Still Loves Me" won "Best Film Song".
