= Fighting Temptation =

Song by Beyoncé, Missy Elliott, MC Lyte, Free

Single by Beyoncé, Missy Elliott, MC Lyte and Free

from the album The Fighting Temptations (Music From The Motion Picture)
- B-side: "I Know"; "Naïve"
- Released: August 18, 2003
- Genre: Funk; hip hop; R&B
- Length: 3:50
- Label: Columbia
- Songwriters: Beyoncé Knowles; Melissa Elliott; Lana Moorer; Marie Wright; Jonathan Burks; LaShaun Owens; Karriem Mack; Walter Murphy; Gene Pistilli
- Producer: Missy Elliott

Beyoncé singles chronology
"Baby Boy" (2003)	"Fighting Temptation" (2003)	"Me, Myself and I" (2003)

Missy Elliott singles chronology
"Gossip Folks" (2002)	"Fighting Temptation" (2003)	"Cop That Shit" (2003)

MC Lyte singles chronology
"It's All Yours" (1998)	"Fighting Temptation" (2003)	"Ride wit Me" (2003)

"Fighting Temptation" is a song recorded by American singer-songwriter Beyoncé and American rappers Missy Elliott, MC Lyte, and Free for the film The Fighting Temptations (2003), starring Beyoncé. It was written by Beyoncé, Elliott, Lana Moorer, Marie Wright, Jonathan Burks, LaShaun Owens, Karriem Mack, and Walter Murphy. An R&B-funk song, "Fighting Temptation" samples Uncle Louie's "I Like Funky Music" (1979). Lyrically, the song makes a reference to fighting against negativity in life as well as waiting for the right person before falling in love. It was released as the lead single from the soundtrack for The Fighting Temptations on August 18, 2003, by Columbia Records.

"Fighting Temptation" received generally favorable reviews from music critics, who complimented the theme, Beyoncé's vocal performance, and the verse-raps. Commercially, it received attention only in European countries, peaking at number 11 in the Netherlands. The accompanying music video for the song was directed by Antti Jokinen.

== Background ==
"Fighting Temptation" appeared on the soundtrack album for The Fighting Temptations (2003), as well as in the film. As a whole, seven tracks featured the vocals of Beyoncé, who had a starring role in the film, along with a choir made up of gospel, R&B and hip hop recording artists. "Fighting Temptation" features additional vocals from American female rappers Missy Elliott, MC Lyte, and Free.

== Music and lyrics ==
"Fighting Temptation" was written by Beyoncé, Missy Elliott, Lana Moorer, Marie Wright, Jonathan Burks, LaShaun Owens, Karriem Mack, Walter Murphy, and Gene Pistilli. Production was handled by Elliott. An R&B-funk song, it samples Uncle Louie's 1979 song "I Like Funky Music". Lyrically, the song is about a group of women's strict "no sex" rule similar to a part of the film's plot, where the female lead Lilly (portrayed by Beyoncé) abstains from being intimate with her love interest (portrayed by Cuba Gooding Jr.).

Heather Phares of AllMusic wrote that the song's lyrics make reference to a "celebration of ladies' night out and waiting for true love." According to Dani Boobyer of the United Kingdom-based website, The Situation, "Fighting Temptation" has "a well worn message about striving for the best and fighting against negativity." Ed Gonzalez of Slant Magazine found that Elliott notices pleasure and joy in sins that make people go to church on Sundays, but in reality, the "party people" are no different from the churchgoers, who sin in their song and music.

== Release ==
During a string of soundtrack releases, Beyoncé commented on the song with Billboard stating: "A lot of music was written especially for the film. At first, I was concerned about the timing of the soundtrack, [because] my solo album was supposed to come out way before the movie. But then the solo album got delayed." While later announcing the release of the soundtrack album in a press release, Beyoncé said:

Once you hear the song 'Fighting Temptation', and all the music in this film, you can't help but fall in love with it. You'll definitely get emotional. You might become happy or even sad, but your heart will get full. All the songs are touching and spiritual, and that's what the movie itself is like.

"Fighting Temptations" was released as a CD single in Germany on July 5, 2004. Prior to that, it was sent to urban contemporary radio for airplay in the United States on August 18, 2003.

== Critical reception ==
Heather Phares of AllMusic wrote: "[...] the seven tracks that feature Beyoncé on her own or with other collaborators are more striking: in particular, the movie's title track, a surprisingly fun and funky celebration." Dani Boobyer of The Situation UK commented that the soundtrack album "jumpstarts with the explosive 'Fighting Temptation' [...] setting R&B princess Beyoncé's sweet vocals against the hard sounds of Missy and MC Lyte's raps." Ed Gonzalez of Slant Magazine wrote that the song's artists are not fighting temptations like the song's title says, but are looking for them.

== Commercial performance ==
"Fighting Temptation" charted across mainland Europe in early 2004, failing to chart altogether in the United States. In the Netherlands, it debuted at number 20 on the Dutch Top 40, peaking at number 13 in its second week. The song reached its peak of number 37 in its sixth week on the Flanders Singles Chart in Belgium, charting for a total of seven consecutive weeks until mid-April 2004. On August 29, the song debuted and peaked at number 42 on the Swiss Singles Chart.

== Music video ==
The accompanying music video for the song was directed by Antti Jokinen and it features Beyoncé, Elliott, MC Lyte and Free. It was shot in an abandoned mansion near Los Angeles by the end of June 2003. Performance footage was seamlessly melded with clips from the movie. On the set, Beyoncé expressed herself:

"Basically, it's kind of like a ladies' night 'cause it's all us females and the song is about basically all these temptations you have with this guy and you're kind of fighting it. The house came from the movie because it kind of reminds me a lot of the house that we filmed in for the movie."

=== Synopsis ===
The video begins with Beyoncé in a red dress moving across a screen of multiple changing colors and then moves to multiple shots of Elliott rapping in a white and red jersey and matching hat, Lyte in a blue dress, and a church choir group. Next, Elliott is shown on roller skates in a white and black outfit rollerskating throughout the mansion. Shots are shown of Elliott in bed with a man and Beyoncé at a party with a guy and singing to the people there. As the song moves to Beyoncé singing the chorus, she is shown in a golden top and black shorts, sitting on a bed and dancing in a room, while back at the party, she is singing for her lover and blowing him kisses. The song then moves to a verse by Mc Lyte and we see her dancing in the middle of a semicircle of men wearing orange prison jumpsuits. Scenes of the movie and of Mc Lyte in front of an ever-changing background are intercut throughout this.

Beyoncé then sings the chorus again and dances in her red dress in front of the background. Mc Lyte and Free are seen at a backyard barbecue party as Mc Lyte's verse begins and she mingles with the party guests, with Elliott as the party DJ. Again, Beyoncé comes back to sing the chorus of the song, now at the barbecue party, with scenes of her dancing in a room of the mansion and scenes from the movie in which she is singing on a stage in front of a large audience with a group of people behind her. With the end of the final chorus, the song moves back to Elliott and Lyte, with the former on her rollerskates as at the beginning and the latter in front of the semicircle of men. The video ends with the four of them sitting at a picnic table at the barbecue party as two small girls clap hands on the opposite bench.

== Track listings and formats ==
European CD single
No.	Title	Length
1.	"Fighting Temptation"	3:51
2.	"I Know" (performed by Destiny's Child)	3:42

European mini CD single
No.	Title	Length
1.	"Fighting Temptation"	3:51
2.	"Naïve" (HR Crump Remix) (performed by Beyoncé and Solange featuring Da Brat)	3:37

== Charts ==
Weekly chart performance for "Fighting Temptation"
Chart (2004)	Peak position
Belgium (Ultratop 50 Flanders)	37
Belgium (Ultratip Bubbling Under Wallonia)	2
Germany (GfK)	54
Netherlands (Dutch Top 40)	13
Netherlands (Single Top 100)	11
Switzerland (Schweizer Hitparade)	42

== Release history ==
Release dates and formats for "Fighting Temptation"
Region	Date	Format(s)	Label(s)	Ref.
United States	August 18, 2003	Urban contemporary radio	Columbia	
Germany	July 5, 2004	CD; mini CD	Sony BMG	
