= True Star (perfume) =

Fragrance endorsed by Tommy Hilfiger

Fragrance by Tommy Hilfiger
- Released: 2004
- Successor: Tommy Girl
- Website: tommyhilfiger.com

True Star is a fragrance endorsed by American fashion designer Tommy Hilfiger released in 2004. The release was followed with a revised version of Beyoncé Knowles' original cover of "Wishing on a Star" and a limited edition EP also titled True Star: A Private Performance. The fragrance's commercial shows the singer Beyoncé Knowles singing a capella the song. Knowles was a poster girl of the perfume. She received $250,000 for this campaign. True Star was followed by one additional release, the True Star Gold.

== Reception ==
In 2005, the fragrance True Star won a FiFi Award for Best New Fragrance Commercial.

== True Star: A Private Performance ==
True Star: A Private Performance

EP by Beyoncé
- Released: 2004
- Genre: R&B
- Length: 7:57
- Label: Tommy Hilfiger; Columbia
- Producer: Beyoncé Knowles; Chink Santana

Beyoncé chronology
Dangerously in Love (2003)	True Star: A Private Performance (2004)	Live at Wembley (2004)

True Star: A Private Performance is the debut extended play (EP) by American singer-songwriter Beyoncé. Produced by herself and Tommy Hilfiger, it was released exclusively in 2004, solely available with limited edition purchases of her fragrance by Hilfiger entitled True Star. The EP's packaging consists of a fold-out digipak picture sleeve, including advertisement for the perfume and a built in picture booklet with lyrics for "Wishing on a Star". The EP was only released as a five-inch CD single, usually included with the purchase of the preceding EP's perfume.

The EP consists of two tracks. "Wishing on a Star" was originally covered by Beyoncé Knowles in 2004, for the live album Live at Wembley. The song was than used to promote the Tommy Hilfiger fragrance. In 2005, the song was included on the soundtrack of the movie Roll Bounce. At the 48th Grammy Awards (2006), Knowles' version was nominated for Best Female R&B Vocal Performance. Knowles released the song as a promotional single on August 17, 2010. The song that appears on the EP was credited originally from Live at Wembley.

The song "Naïve", which is a duet between Solange Knowles and Beyoncé, featuring Da Brat, was included on Solange Knowles' debut studio album Solo Star (2002) as the twenty-first track, tentatively untitled.

=== Track listing ===
Credits adapted from the EP's liner notes.

No.	Title	Writer(s)	Producer(s)	Length
1.	"Wishing on a Star"	Billie Ray Calvin	Beyoncé Knowles; Chink Santana	4:07
2.	"Naïve" (with Solange featuring Da Brat)	B. Knowles; HR Crump; Mathew Knowles; Da Brat	B. Knowles; Santana	3:45
Total length:				7:57
