= Wembley Arena =

Indoor arena in Wembley, Greater London

Wembley Arena OVO Arena Wembley

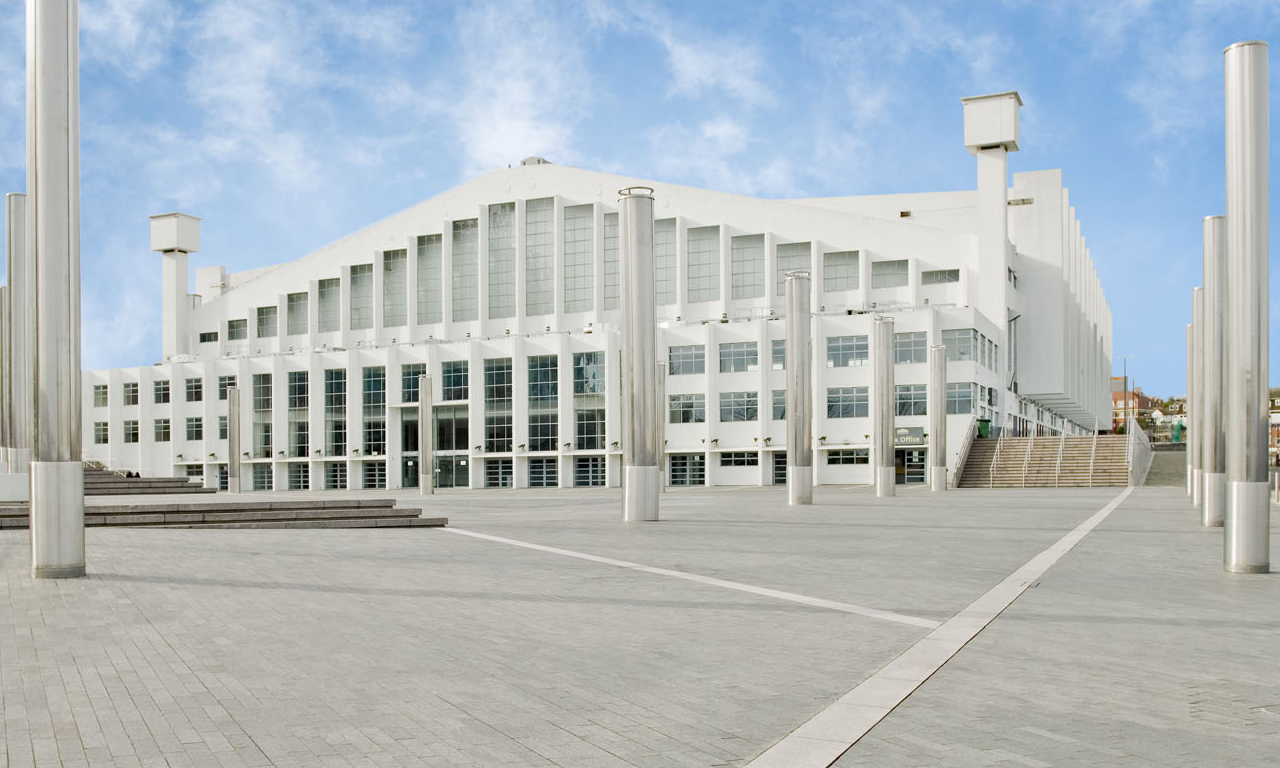
- Arena frontage
- Interactive map of Wembley Arena; OVO Arena Wembley
- Former names: Empire Pool (1934–1978); Wembley Arena (1978–2014); SSE Arena Wembley (2014–2022)
- Location: Arena Square; Engineers Way; Wembley Park; Wembley; HA9 0AA
- Coordinates: 51°33′29″N 0°16′59″W
- Owner: Quintain
- Operator: Anschutz Entertainment Group / ASM Global
- Capacity: 12,500
- Public transit: Wembley Park; Wembley Stadium; Wembley Central

Listed Building – Grade II
- Official name: Wembley Arena (formerly The Empire Pool)
- Designated: 9 October 1976
- Reference no.: 1078877

Construction
- Groundbreaking: November 1933
- Opened: 25 July 1934
- Renovated: 2005–2006
- Reopened: 2 April 2006
- Architects: Arthur Elvin; Sir Owen Williams (engineer)

Website
- ovoarena.co.uk

Wembley Arena (/ˈwɛmbli/) (originally the Empire Pool, currently known as OVO Arena Wembley for sponsorship reasons) is an indoor arena next to Wembley Stadium in Wembley, Greater London, England. The 12,500-seat facility is Greater London's second-largest indoor arena after the O2 Arena, and the ninth-largest in the United Kingdom.

The Empire Pool (also known as Empire Pool and Sports Arena) was built for the 1934 British Empire Games by Arthur Elvin. As its original name suggested, it was where the games' swimming events were held. The pool was last used for the 1948 Summer Olympics. The modern arena is now used as a venue for music, comedy, family entertainment and sport.

== History ==
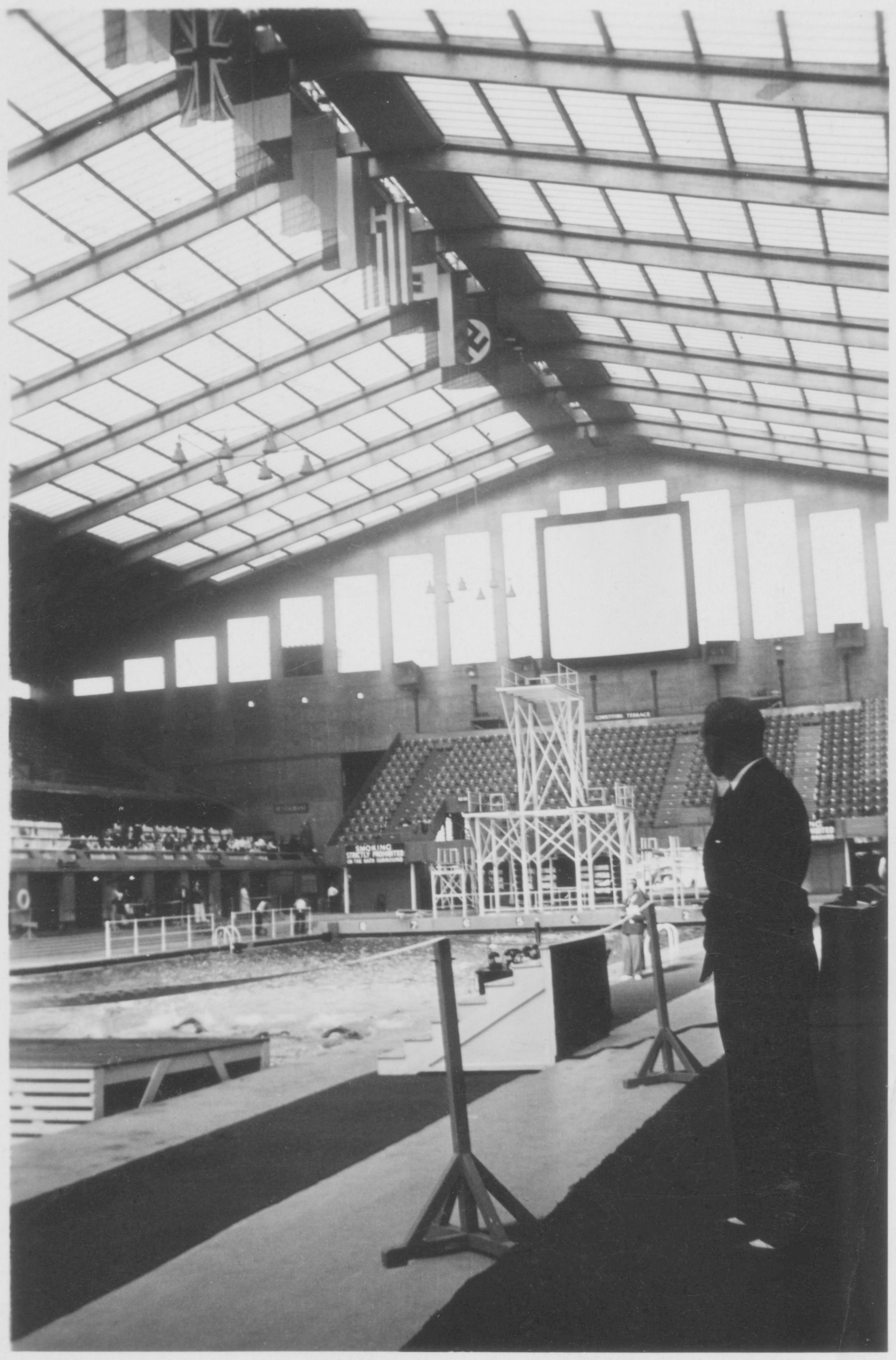
First day of the 1938 European Aquatics Championships. Ten years later, it would host swimming at the 1948 Summer Olympics.

The building was designed by the engineer Sir Owen Williams, without the employment of an architect. Williams built a unique structure, with cantilevers meeting in the middle, thus avoiding the need for internal pillars. He also used high quality concrete, meaning that it has aged far better than many more recent concrete buildings. The building had a reinforced concrete frame of three hinged arches spanning 240 feet (73 m), which was the largest concrete span of any similar structure in the world at that time.

Work on the Empire Pool began in November 1933, and it was opened on 25 July 1934 by Prince Henry, Duke of Gloucester. The swimming pool itself was 200 feet (61 m) long and 60 feet (18 m) wide with a removable deck for ice skating. As with the adjacent stadium, construction was supervised by R.J. Fowler, Wembley's chief building inspector. The end of the building opened up and led to sunbathing terraces and lawns. The sides had 15 massive concrete buttresses and the tops of the ends were glazed with 20 narrow window lights of increasing height from the edges to the centre.

Ice hockey was introduced to the Empire Pool in October 1934.

In 1940 the Empire Pool was used to billet several hundred Gibraltarian evacuees who were removed from Gibraltar as the Fortress was extensively reinforced in expectation of heavy Axis attack and possible Invasion.

In October 1976, the Empire Pool was awarded Grade II Listed status, protecting it and recognising it as a building of special architectural interest, technological innovation and virtuosity. On 1 February 1978, the Empire Pool was renamed Wembley Arena.

When the venue was known as the Empire Pool, it hosted the annual NME Poll Winners Concerts during the mid-1960s. Audiences of 10,000 viewed acts like the Beatles, Cliff Richard & The Shadows, the Monkees, the Hollies, Dusty Springfield, Joe Brown & the Bruvvers, and Dave Dee, Dozy, Beaky, Mick & Tich. The individual performances were then finished by a famous personality joining the respective performer on stage and presenting them with their award. The Beatles were presented with one of their awards by actor Roger Moore, and Joe Brown was joined on stage by Roy Orbison who presented him with his own award. These ceremonies were filmed, recorded and later broadcast on television.

Musical acts who subsequently performed there include Led Zeppelin (who played a special two night "Electric Magic" concert during their 1971 Winter Tour; the poster for the event, designed by Steve Hardcastle, sold on the night for 30p, has become a collector's item, fetching over £500 at auction), T. Rex (whose Ringo Starr–directed documentary film Born to Boogie is centred on a 1972 concert at the Empire Pool), Genesis, The Faces supported by the Pink Fairies and the New York Dolls (days prior to the death of drummer Billy Murcia), David Bowie, the Rolling Stones, Bon Jovi, INXS, Pink Floyd (who played there on their 1974 British Winter tour and 1977 "In the Flesh" tour), Roxy Music (played two nights there in October 1975 – on their Siren tour), The Eagles (on their Hotel California 1978 tour), The Electric Light Orchestra played a then record of 8 consecutive nights in 1978, the Grateful Dead, Billy Joel (on his An Innocent Man tour in 1984), Dire Straits (who played there on their Brothers in Arms tour in 1985 (13 consecutive nights) and "On Every Street" tour in 1991), Status Quo, Queen, and The Who.

=== Renovation ===
The venue was renovated, along with Wembley Stadium, as part of the early-21st-century regeneration of the Wembley Park area. The arena was closed for fourteen months, starting in February 2005, for a refurbishment costing £35 million; events were moved to a neighbouring temporary 10,000-seat venue, the Wembley Arena Pavilion. The new arena opened to the public on 2 April 2006, with a concert by Depeche Mode. The temporary pavilion was moved to Attard, Malta, opening as the permanent Malta Fairs & Conventions Centre in December 2006.

In September 2013, it was announced that AEG Facilities had signed a 15-year contract to operate the arena. Wembley Arena was inherited by ASM Global following its formation on 1 October 2019, when AEG Facilities and SMG merged. Following the acquisition of ASM Global by Legends, the venue has been operated under the Legends Global brand since December 2025. Legends Global is the trading name of a group of companies, including Legends Global Facilities, a company registered in England and Wales with company number 7393342 whose registered office is at Manchester Arena, Hunts Bank Approach, Manchester, M3 1AR.

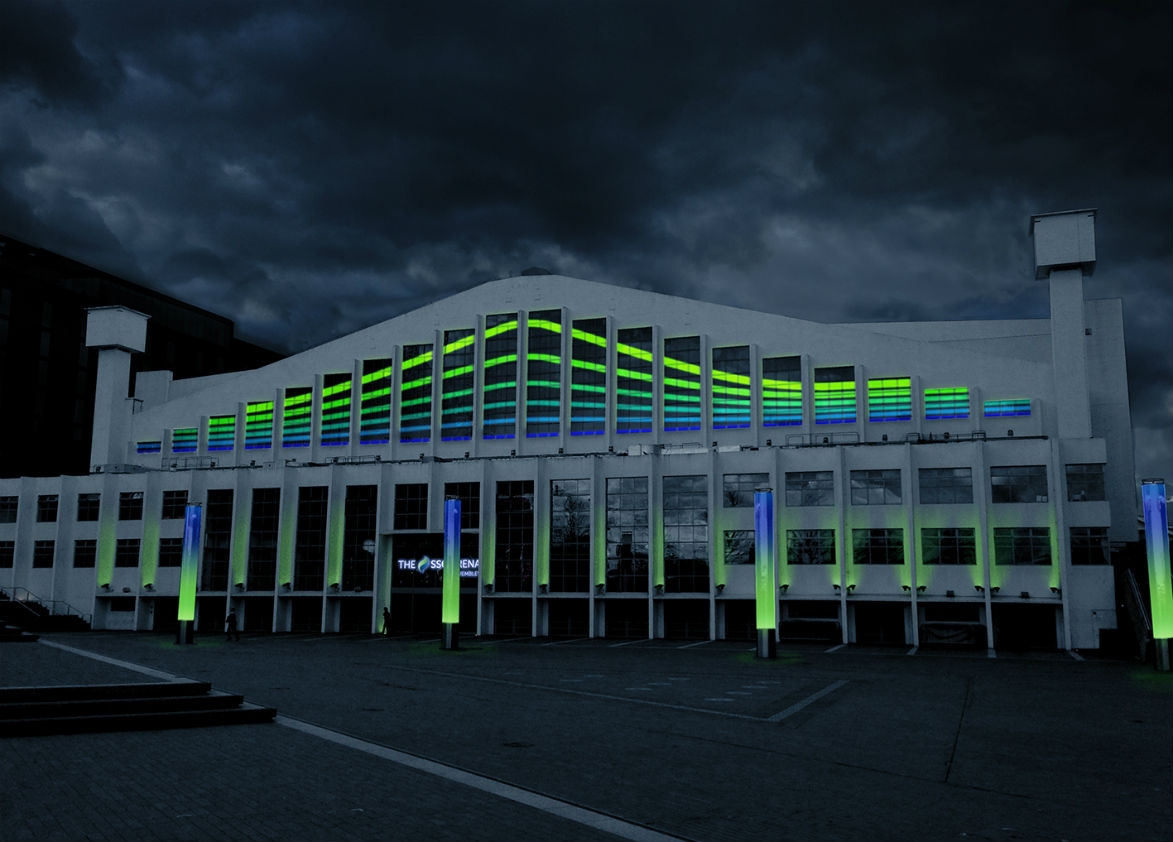
The arena in SSE colours

The building was renamed the SSE Arena on 1 June 2014 after energy company SSE plc bought the naming rights to the venue for 10 years. Since early 2022 it has been known as OVO Arena Wembley.

=== Returning acts ===
The Grateful Dead have released recordings of complete shows from 7 and 8 April 1972 as part of Europe '72: The Complete Recordings. The Grateful Dead also performed at Wembley Arena on 30 and 31 October, and 1 November 1990 as part of their Europe 1990 concert tour. Bruce Hornsby accompanied the band for this concert.

A notable attendance record was set in the early 1970s by David Cassidy in his first tour of Great Britain in 1973, when he sold out six performances in one weekend. The experience and the associated mass hysteria was documented in a TV special called David Cassidy: Weekend at Wembley.

Queen first performed at Wembley Arena from 11 to 13 May 1978 on their News of the World Tour. They would return on 8 to 10 December 1980 on The Game Tour, and in September 1984 on The Works Tour.

ABBA played six sold-out concerts, from 5 to 10 November 1979. The shows were filmed by Swedish television for a documentary which was released in 2004 on DVD as ABBA in Concert. In September 2014 Universal Music released Live at Wembley Arena, featuring most of the concert of 10 November on CD, vinyl LP and digital format. After the tour, the members of the band talked about the warmth of the Wembley audience. "It was like coming home after a couple of nights," said guitarist Björn Ulvaeus. A finale from these concerts, "The Way Old Friends Do", is the closing track on ABBA's seventh studio album, Super Trouper. Vocalist Agnetha Fältskog said it was the vibe from the audience that made the track work so much better as a live performance than as a studio track.

George Dalaras performed a sold-out concert at Wembley Arena on 27 June 1992. It is the biggest Greek concert ever held in United Kingdom. It was a personal initiative of George Dalaras in order to support Cyprus and to promote the Cyprus problem. Among others, Vanessa Redgrave and Georges Moustaki had taken part in the concert.

Tina Turner is the female artist with the most shows, with 25. Cliff Richard is the male artist with the most number of shows with 61, whereas Status Quo hold the record for a rock band with 45 performances. Irish band Westlife are the pop band with most shows with 28.

=== 2000s ===
Christina Aguilera performed there on 2, 3 and 5 November 2003 as part of her Stripped Tour. The shows were filmed and later released as Stripped Live in the U.K. Destiny's Child performed there on 18 and 19 June 2002 as part of her Destiny's Child World Tour. Beyoncé performed there on 10 and 11 November 2003 as part of their Dangerously in Love Tour. Live at Wembley was filmed during these two concerts.

Pearl Jam hold the attendance record for one show, with 12,470 fans at their 2007 gig. Madonna performed at the arena eight times during her Confessions Tour. The Confessions Tour album was filmed during these concerts.

=== 2010s ===
On 3 August 2013, Nepathya became the first Nepalese band to perform at the Arena. On 19 December 2015, Nightwish became the first Finnish act to headline the Arena. On 2 April 2016, Babymetal became the first Japanese act to headline the Arena and set the record for the Arena's highest ever merchandise sales.

On 12 November 2017, the 2017 MTV Europe Music Awards ceremony was held at the arena. The event was hosted by Rita Ora and featured performances from Eminem, Demi Lovato, U2, The Killers, Kesha and more. The Queen biopic Bohemian Rhapsody premiered at the Arena on 23 October 2018, in recognition of how Freddie Mercury and Queen gave the iconic Live Aid performance in 1985 at nearby Wembley Stadium. On 17 November 2018, London based DJ Andy C performed a DJ set lasting five hours, the first all night event to take place in the venue's history. The event had sold out in three days six months prior.

On 7, 8 and 9 March 2019, American musical duo Twenty One Pilots performed three shows at the arena as part of The Bandito Tour. On 10 March 2019, Chinese singer-songwriter Joker Xue headlined the arena as part of his Skyscraper World Tour.

=== 2020s ===
The 13th Global Siyum HaShas of Daf Yomi took place in January 2020, the largest of its kind in the UK. The second series of BBC One's The Wall was filmed at the venue in 2020.

On 17 March 2023, All Time Low filmed their live show Alive at Wembley, which was live streamed and released on vinyl. On 25 October 2023, Critical Role filmed a live show, titled The Mighty Nein Reunion: Echoes of the Solstice, where they played Dungeons & Dragons. It sold out "in less than 6 minutes" with 12,000 tickets. On 19 November 2023, Chinese singer-songwriter Joker Xue returned as part of his Extraterrestrial World Tour. On 21 June 2024, singer-songwriter IU became the first South Korean female soloist to headline the arena as part of her HEREH World Tour. On 11 October 2024, Japanese band One Ok Rock performed at the arena for their Premonition World Tour, giving their largest show in the UK since their debut, with a special appearance from Ed Sheeran.

On 2 March 2025, Korean pop group, Aespa, performed at the arena as part of their "Synk: Parallel Line" tour, making it their second show in London, after their first tour, "Synk: Hyper Line". On 12 March 2025, Hong Kong singer-songwriter and actor Ian Chan, a well known member of Cantopop group MIRROR, will begin the first stop of his "Tears" in My Sight solo concert tour. On 3 May 2025, Norwegian singer-songwriter Aurora performed at the arena for her What Happened to the Earth? tour, giving her biggest solo show in the UK. Fredrik Svabø and Pomme were the opening acts. On 25 May 2025, Philippine pop group BINI performed in the arena as part of the Biniverse World Tour 2025. On 13 December 2025, American pop-punk band Bowling for Soup performed their biggest headline show at the arena, with Wheatus and Punk Rock Factory opening for them.

== Sporting events ==
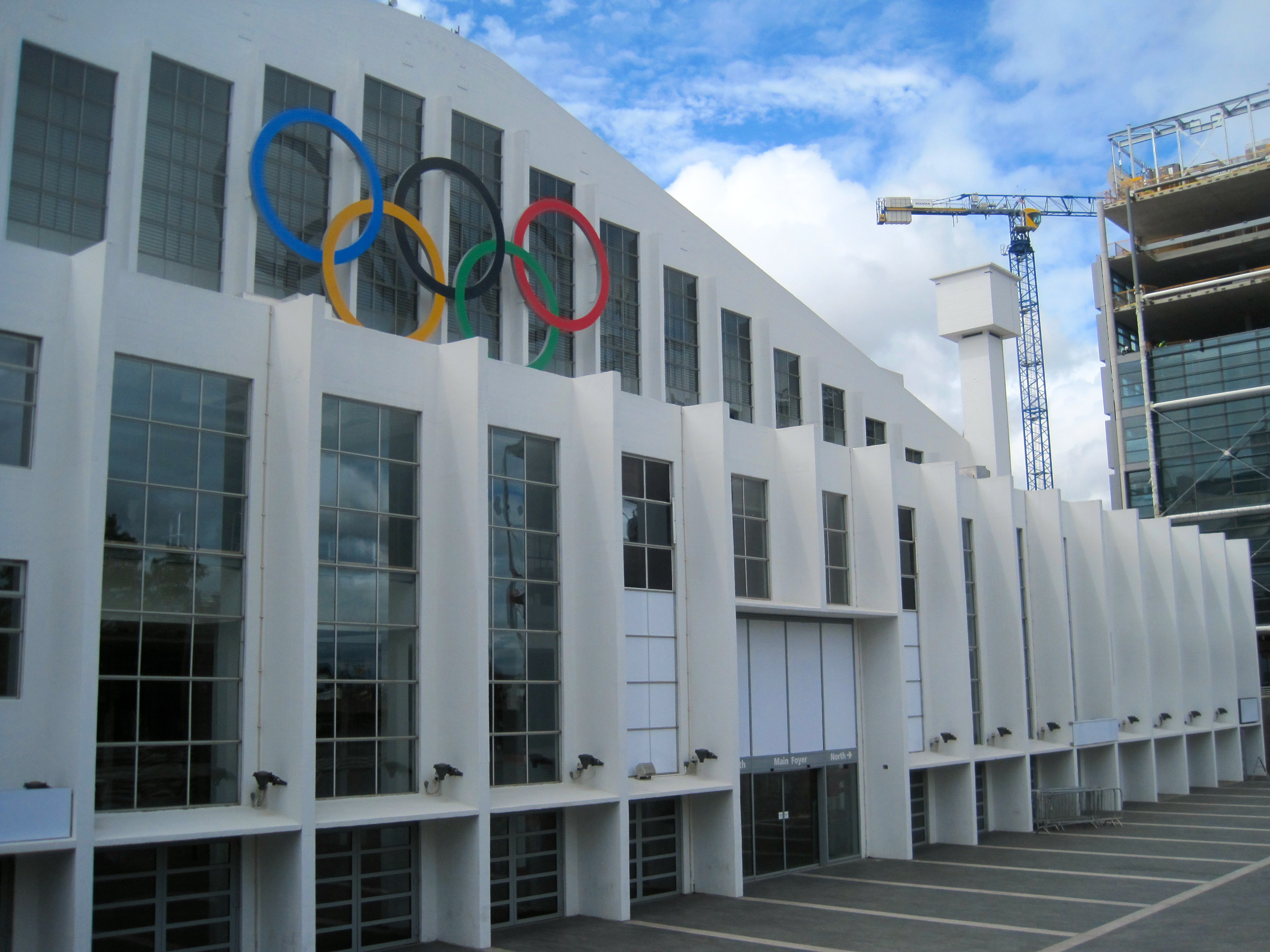
Wembley Arena with Olympic rings for the 2012 Summer Olympics

=== 1948 and 2012 Summer Olympics ===
During the 1948 Summer Olympics, the venue hosted the Olympic boxing, Olympic diving, Olympic swimming, and Olympic water polo events. The venue hosted Olympic badminton and Olympic rhythmic gymnastics at the 2012 Summer Olympics.

=== Tennis ===
From 1934 until 1990, the Empire Pool / Wembley Arena was the venue for the Wembley Professional Tennis Championships which was a major pro tennis event from 1927 until 1967.

=== Cycling ===
From 1936 to 1939, the early 1950s and the late 1960s to the late 1970s, the Skol 6-Day cycle race was held there. An indoor velodrome of 166 metres was assembled from sections each September. This was Britain's first indoor velodrome. Top professional riders from the European 6-Day circuit came to London, including Eddy Merckx, Peter Post, Patrick Sercu and many others. British riders such as World pursuit champion Hugh Porter and British Champion Tony Gowland also competed.

=== Ice hockey ===
The Wembley Lions and Wembley Monarchs were two ice hockey teams that used the venue regularly during the 1940s, 1950s, and 1960s, while the London Lions used the venue for a season in the 1970s. Wembley also hosted the British Hockey League play-off finals weekend at the end of each season up until the league's disbandment in 1996. The arena played host to two pairs of NHL preseason games: the Chicago Blackhawks versus the Montreal Canadiens in 1992 and the Toronto Maple Leafs versus the New York Rangers in 1993.

=== Boxing ===
The boxing World Championship bout between then champion Alan Minter and challenger Marvin Hagler, which the latter won, was held at Wembley Arena in 1980. The arena hosted the MF & DAZN: X Series 004 and 007 events for KSI vs FaZe Temperrr and KSI vs Joe Fournier in 2023.

=== Mixed martial arts ===
The arena played host to BAMMA mixed martial arts events on in May 2011 (BAMMA 6), September 2012 (BAMMA 10) and September 2017 (BAMMA 31) as well as UFC on Fuel TV: Barão vs. McDonald, in February 2013.

=== Other sports ===
The Horse of the Year Show was held there from 1959 to 2002. From 1979 to 1983, indoor speedway was held during the winter, with the riders racing on concrete on a 181-yard track Two NBA basketball exhibition matches were played at the arena in1 October 1993, featuring the Atlanta Hawks and Orlando Magic. It hosted the News of the World Darts Championship final stage from 1948 to 1949, 1959 to 1962 and 1978 to 1988 and the final of the Premier League Darts in 2009 and 2011 as well as the 2010 playoff finals. It also hosted the Masters snooker tournament from 2007 until 2011.

=== Esports ===
The European League Of Legends Championship Series, which is a competitive esports league in the computer game League of Legends, played its round of matches at the arena in 2014. The 2015 League of Legends World Championship quarterfinals took place in the Arena. In September 2018, the playoffs for the FACEIT Major: London 2018 Counter-Strike: Global Offensive Major Championship took place in the arena.

=== Professional wrestling ===
The venue has hosted many professional wrestling events from Joint Promotions, WWE and their NXT brand (TakeOver: London), World Championship Wrestling, World Wrestling All-Stars, Total Nonstop Action Wrestling, Progress Wrestling, and Revolution Pro Wrestling.

== Square of Fame ==
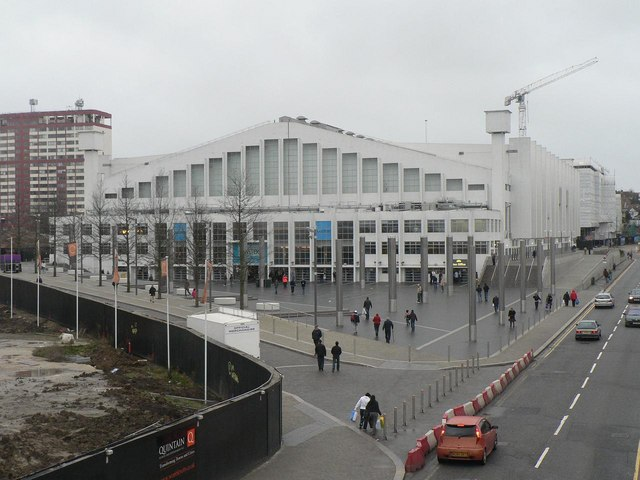
Square of Fame

With the reopening of Wembley Arena in 2006, a "Square of Fame" area has been created in front of the arena. Similar to the Hollywood Walk of Fame, notable Wembley Arena performers are invited to have bronze plaques imprinted with their names and handprints. The first star to have a plaque was Madonna, on 1 August 2006. On 9 November 2006, Cliff Richard added his handprints to the Square. Rick Parfitt and Francis Rossi, of Status Quo, unveiled a plaque, with one of each of their handprints, on 16 December 2006. On 9 January 2007, Kylie Minogue included her handprints, on the final day of the London leg of her Showgirl Homecoming Tour.

Seven time World Snooker Champion Stephen Hendry added his handprints on 21 January 2007. International country superstar Dolly Parton unveiled her plaque, on the final night of her UK tour, on 25 March 2007. Canadian musician Bryan Adams unveiled his plaque, on 10 May 2007, just before his 25th appearance at the venue. Just three days later, singer Lionel Richie was presented with his plaque on 13 May 2007, after another sold-out performance at the arena. Irish boyband Westlife unveiled their plaque on 28 March 2008, after 27 sell-out shows, in the space of 10 years. They have sold 250,000 tickets. All four members, Shane Filan, Nicky Byrne, Kian Egan and Mark Feehily were presented with a cast of their hands, which can also be seen in the Square of Fame. Alice Cooper added his handprints in 2012 as the only solo artist to have headlined at the venue in each of the past five consecutive decades.

== Transport ==
Wembley Arena is served by Wembley Park station on the London Underground via Olympic Way, and Wembley Central station via the White Horse Bridge.

Train services are operated by Chiltern Railways from Wembley Stadium station to London Marylebone and Birmingham. London Buses routes 92 and 440 stop directly outside the arena. Wembley Central station is located nearby on High Road and is served by London Overground, London Underground, Southern and London Northwestern Railway services.

The onsite parking facility is shared with Wembley Stadium, essentially being the open-air surface parking surrounding the eastern flank of Wembley Stadium and the multistorey car park. These are called Green Car Park and Red Car Park respectively. There is disabled parking available onsite, at the Green Car Park, at a reduced rate but on a first-come, first-served basis.

== See also ==
- List of Commonwealth Games venues
