= Verizon Ladies First Tour =

2004 concert tour

- National tour by Beyoncé, Alicia Keys and Missy Elliott
- Location: United States
- Associated album: Dangerously in Love; The Diary of Alicia Keys; This Is Not a Test!
- Start date: March 12, 2004
- End date: April 21, 2004
- Legs: 1
- No. of shows: 30
- Box office: $19.4 million ($33.1 million in 2025 dollars)
Beyoncé tour chronology
- Dangerously in Love Tour
- (2003)
- Verizon Ladies First Tour
- (2004)
- The Beyoncé Experience
- (2007)
Alicia Keys tour chronology
- Songs in A Minor Tour
- (2002)
- Verizon Ladies First Tour
- (2004)
- Diary Tour
- (2005)

The Verizon Ladies First Tour was a co-headlining concert tour by American singers Beyoncé, Alicia Keys and Missy Elliott. Canadian singer Tamia was featured as a special guest on certain dates. The tour, dubbed an "urban Lilith Fair", supported Beyoncé's debut studio album, Dangerously in Love (2003), Keys' second album, The Diary of Alicia Keys (2003), and Elliott's fourth and fifth albums, Under Construction (2002) and This is Not a Test! (2003), respectively.

The trio toured the United States performing in over twenty cities during March and April 2004. Ladies First was the first time at least three female R&B/hip hop artists were featured as headliners, and it went on to be one of the biggest tours of that year, ranking 34th on Pollstar's "Top Tours of 2004"—grossing around $20 million. The success of the tour prompted talks for a second tour in 2005; however, those plans were scrapped, with Verizon focused on developing their VIP Tour instead.

== Background ==
The tour was originally supposed to feature Beyoncé Knowles along with Ashanti, Monica, Mýa and Mary J. Blige; however, scheduling conflicts prevented these four women from being available. When the tour was officially announced, it was promoted as featuring Beyoncé with Keys and Elliott, as well as Tamia joining the bill. The tour was announced by various media outlets in January 2004. Conceived by Verizon Communications, the tour was sponsored by Steve Madden and L'Oréal. Hayman Entertainment and Clear Channel Entertainment served as tour promoters. Costumes and fashions were by Dolce & Gabbana. Upon the tour's announcement, and with tabloid speculation of a three-way "rivalry" between the artists, Beyoncé dispelled these rumors, saying that all three women were already good friends and there would be no competitive energies, on-stage or off. All three expressed their interest in performing on a tour of this magnitude and nature, as it would be the first modern tour highlighting iconic women in the hip hop and R&B music scenes. Beyoncé stated:

"Even before I started putting my album together last year, I wanted to get together a tour with other women. I know that you have a lot of types of tours with other types of artists, but not just strictly hip-hop and R&B women".

== Critical reception ==
The tour was lauded by critics and spectators. Although most reviews praised the ensemble, many felt Keys and Beyoncé were the stars of the show. Neil Drumming of Entertainment Weekly thought Keys was the most "radiant" performer of the evening at the Office Depot Center in Florida; he felt "Her old-school references charmed, and her clap-along 'How Come You Don't Call Me' obliterated the CD version. Mounting the piano, tickling keys with one hand, she struck a quirky balance between class and kitsch". Jon Parles from The New York Times wrote that all the ladies "earned their due" during the concert at the Nassau Veterans Memorial Coliseum, in Uniondale, New York. He further stated that "The three headliners have made their way in a hip-hop culture that largely treats women as playthings and conquests. Their response has been to play along while making modest demands of their own. In the meantime, they're willing to work like superwomen".

Unlike the aforementioned reviews, Steve Hammer (of the newspaper NUVO) was not impressed with the show at Indianapolis' Conseco Fieldhouse, feeling the concert to be "inconsequential". He further explained that "Any show featuring three multiplatinum recording artists is bound to struggle against time limitations. But the problems plaguing each of the three fine artists — Missy Elliott, Alicia Keys and Beyoncé — was not that the sets were so short, but that they were so meaningless".

Nonetheless, high praises continued as the trio performed at the MCI Center in Washington, D.C.; Portsia Smith, of The Free Lance–Star, said that the show was a night of "talent" and "beauty", and spoke highly of all the acts—though stating that Keys was the most in-demand for the audience. Of Keys, Smith elaborated, "She wowed the audience members, who probably thought she would just sit at her piano and sang. But how wrong were they." Keys received another positive review from Stephen Kiehl, of The Baltimore Sun, saying: "[…]But the most astute set[-]closer belonged to Keys, who sang 'You Don't Know My Name' from her new album. The song features a one-sided cell phone conversation between a coffee shop waitress and the guy she has a crush on. She asks him out, but then loses the signal."

Ben Johnson (of the newspaper The Day) wrote that the show at the Hartford Civic Center was nothing short of "decadence". He continues, "[...] became a rallying point of girl power fit for an appearance by the Powerpuff Girls". The highlight of the tour was the concert at Madison Square Garden. The show featured guest appearances from Big Boi, Fabolous, Jay-Z, Kelly Rowland and Michelle Williams. Stephen Reid of MTV News felt that throughout the entire show, Beyoncé was the star. He remarked, "If Muhammad Ali had been at Madison Square Garden Monday night, no doubt he would've found something to pound like a drum as he yelled, 'The champ is here! The champ is here!' That's exactly the aura Beyoncé gave off as she began her closing set of the Verizon Ladies First Tour, which also features Alicia Keys, Missy Elliott and Tamia". Reid also gave rave reviews for Keys' section of the show. "Fittingly, she started with 'Heartburn', shaking her body like Ike-era Tina Turner, causing a sudden rise in blood pressure among the men in the audience. The sex appeal was being poured all over Madison Square like milk on Cheerios".

Jennifer Wood, of the East Valley Tribune, enjoyed the show at the America West Arena in Phoenix, Arizona, saying, "From the moment Elliott appeared on stage wearing a black suit covered in rhinestones to Beyoncé's exit nearly four hours later, the audience rarely sat as it ogled three of the most celebrated female talents in hip-hop and R&B". The San Francisco Chronicle's Neva Chonin said the concert at The Arena in Oakland—which featured Carlos Santana as a guest—proved why Beyoncé is a star, saying, "In a time of assembly-line pop icons, she manages to infuse her packaged performance with charisma and genuine talent. Her vocal workouts on ballads like 'Dangerously in Love 2' clambered smoothly up and down the scales".

== Shows ==
List of United States concerts, showing date, city, venue, opening act, attendance and gross revenue
Date (2004)	City	Venue	Opening act	Attendance (Tickets sold / available)	Revenue
March 12	Sunrise	Office Depot Center	Tamia	11,962 / 12,285 (97%)	$808,378
March 14	New Orleans	New Orleans Arena	Tamia	10,983 / 12,390 (89%)	$659,606
March 15	Dallas	American Airlines Center	Tamia	6,624 / 12,096 (55%)	$444,138
March 17	San Antonio	SBC Center	Tamia	8,988 / 13,391 (67%)	$535,029
March 18 (Note: The concert of March 18, 2004 in Houston, Texas at the Reliant Stadium was a part of the Spring Break Stampede.)	Houston	Reliant Stadium	N/A	N/A	N/A
March 21	Greensboro	Greensboro Coliseum Complex	Tamia	6,520 / 10,564 (62%)	$366,003
March 23	Philadelphia	Wachovia Center	Tamia	12,571 / 12,571 (100%)	$864,919
March 24	Boston	FleetCenter	Tamia	12,061 / 17,201 (70%)	$815,963
March 25	Uniondale	Nassau Coliseum	Tamia	8,686 / 17,472 (50%)	$620,425
March 26	Hampton	Hampton Coliseum	N/A	N/A	N/A
March 27	Charlotte	Charlotte Coliseum	Tamia	10,145 / 17,549 (58%)	$632,375
March 28	Atlanta	Philips Arena	Tamia	12,310 / 12,310 (100%)	$845,693
March 29	Cleveland	Gund Arena	N/A	N/A	N/A
March 30	Indianapolis	Conseco Fieldhouse	Tamia	6,883 / 14,123 (49%)	$369,175
April 1	Minneapolis	Target Center	Tamia	8,123 / 12,363 (66%)	$369,287
April 2	Rosemont	Allstate Arena	Tamia	11,585 / 14,391 (81%)	$723,885
April 3	Auburn Hills	The Palace of Auburn Hills	Tamia	10,674 / 14,899 (72%)	$703,978
April 5	East Rutherford	Continental Airlines Arena	Tamia	11,505 / 15,474 (73%)	$817,340
April 6	Philadelphia	Wachovia Center	Tamia	9,382 / 14,182 (66%)	$623,428
April 7	Washington, D.C.	MCI Center	Tamia	25,379 / 30,826 (82%)	$1,708,805
April 9	Hartford	Hartford Civic Center	Tamia	8,944 / 11,245 (80%)	$609,898
April 10	Uniondale	Nassau Coliseum	Tamia	12,936 / 12,936 (100%)	$940,406
April 11	Washington, D.C.	MCI Center	Tamia	(Note: The score data is representative of the two shows in Washington, D.C. at the MCI Center on April 7 and 11 respectively.)	
April 12	New York City	Madison Square Garden	Tamia	13,725 / 13,725 (100%)	$1,110,090
April 15	Phoenix	America West Arena	Tamia	9,326 / 11,932 (78%)	$568,350
April 16	Las Vegas	Mandalay Bay Events Center	N/A	9,131 / 9,378 (97%)	$778,917
April 17	Anaheim	Arrowhead Pond	Tamia	21,697 / 25,432 (85%)	$1,616,943
April 18	Oakland	The Arena in Oakland	Tamia	20,725 / 24,362 (85%)	$1,644,858
April 20	Oakland	The Arena in Oakland	Tamia	20,725 / 24,362 (85%)	$1,644,858
April 21	Anaheim	Arrowhead Pond	Tamia	(Note: The score data is representative of the two shows in Anaheim, California at the Arrowhead Pond of Anaheim on April 17 and 21 respectively.)	
TOTAL				280,865 / 363,097 (77%)	$19,177,889
