= Angela Beyincé =

American songwriter, actress, and music executive

- Born: Angela Renee Beyincé; October 25, 1976 (age 49); Galveston, Texas, U.S.
- Other name: Angie Beyincé
- Occupations: Songwriter; actress; music executive
- Relatives: Tina Knowles (aunt); Beyoncé (cousin); Solange Knowles (cousin); Blue Ivy Carter (first cousin, once removed)

Angela Renee Beyincé (Note: Pronounced /biˈɒnseɪ/ bee-ON-say (like Beyoncé).) (born October 25, 1976) is an American songwriter, actress, and music executive. She is a cousin of American singers Beyoncé and Solange Knowles, and has made songwriting contributions to several of Beyoncé's albums including Dangerously in Love, Destiny Fulfilled, B'Day, and I Am... Sasha Fierce. She was cast as hair salon assistant Pamela "Pam" Malbrough in the Tyler Perry-created BET comedy drama series Sistas.

== Career ==
=== Parkwood Entertainment ===
Beyincé began her career in the entertainment industry as an officially-credited assistant on Beyoncé co-starring films The Fighting Temptations (2003), The Pink Panther (2006), and Dreamgirls (2006). She also worked as Vice President of Operations at Parkwood Entertainment during the planning, execution, negotiations, and release of Beyoncé's surprise fifth studio album, with the Parkwood team and their decisions later analyzed in a Harvard Business School case.

=== Songwriting ===
In the early 2000s, Beyincé was a frequent co-writer and participant in Beyoncé's studio sessions, resulting in songwriting credits on many of her songs, including "Get Me Bodied", "Why Don't You Love Me", "Upgrade U", and the hit song "Naughty Girl", as well as the number one single "Check on It". She has also written songs for Destiny's Child ("Girl"), K-pop group Playback, close friend Kelly Rowland, and the Fox television show Star. Her contributions to various albums have resulted in several ASCAP songwriting awards.

=== Acting ===
In 2020, Beyincé was cast by casting director Kim Coleman (Blackkklansman, Lovecraft Country, Snowfall) for an appearance on the OWN primetime Tyler Perry soap opera If Loving You Is Wrong. Later that year, Beyincé was cast as hair salon assistant Pamela "Pam" Malbrough, a recurring (and, in later seasons, regular) character, in the Perry-created BET comedy drama series Sistas. She also serves as a consultant producer for the show.

== Songwriting credits ==
Credits are courtesy of Discogs, Tidal, Spotify, and AllMusic.

Title	Year	Artist	Album
"Naughty Girl" (Solo or Featuring Lil' Kim)	2003	Beyoncé	Dangerously in Love
"Be with You"	2003	Beyoncé	Dangerously in Love
"Speechless"	2003	Beyoncé	Dangerously in Love
"Summertime" (Featuring Diddy)	2003	Beyoncé	The Fighting Temptations (soundtrack)
"T-Shirt"	2004	Destiny's Child	Destiny Fulfilled
"Girl"	2004	Destiny's Child	Destiny Fulfilled
"Love"	2004	Destiny's Child	Destiny Fulfilled
"Gots My Own"	2004	Destiny's Child	Destiny Fulfilled
"My Man"	2004	Destiny's Child	Destiny Fulfilled
"Why You Actin'"	2004	Destiny's Child	Destiny Fulfilled
"Check on It" (Featuring Slim Thug & Bun B)	2005	Beyoncé	#1's & B'Day
"Get Me Bodied"	2006	Beyoncé	B'Day
"Upgrade U" (Featuring Jay-Z)	2006	Beyoncé	B'Day
"Freakum Dress"	2006	Beyoncé	B'Day
"Back Up"	2006	Beyoncé	B'Day
"World Wide Woman"	2006	Beyoncé	B'Day
"Kiss Me"	2006	Cassie	Cassie
"Gotsta Go" (Part I)" (Featuring Da Brat)	2007	Kelly Rowland	Ms. Kelly
"It's Me... (Remix)"	2007	Swizz Beatz	One Man Band Man
"Video Phone" (Solo or Featuring Lady Gaga)	2008	Beyoncé	I Am... Sasha Fierce
"Why Don't You Love Me"	2008	Beyoncé	I Am... Sasha Fierce
"Video Phone (Remix)" (Featuring Beyoncé)	2010	Pitbull	Mr. Worldwide Mixtape
"Move Your Body" (Let's Move! Flash Workout)	2011	Beyoncé	Non-album single
"The Girl Is Mine" (Featuring Destiny's Child & Brandy)	2015	99 Souls	Non-album single
"I Wonder" (Solo or Featuring Eric Nam)	2015	Playback	I Wonder (플레이백)
"Suga"	2017	Take 3	STAR: Original Soundtrack from Season 1
"You Got It"	2017	Take 3	STAR: Original Soundtrack from Season 1
"It Wasn't Me"	2018	Take 3	STAR: Original Soundtrack from Season 2
"Run the World (Girls) (Homecoming Live)"	2019	Beyoncé	Homecoming: The Live Album
"Love You More At Christmas Time"	2019	Kelly Rowland	Non-album single
"Cuerpo (Tumbao)" (Featuring Maluma)	2026	Beyoncé	B'Day (20th Anniversary Edition)

=== Unreleased songs ===
Credits are courtesy of ASCAP and Genius.

- "Best Of Me" – Angela Beyincé, Shane Pittman, Maria Ann Abraham
- "Endless" – Angela Beyincé, Elizabeth Margaret McAvoy, Shane Stevens
- "Fascination" – Angela Beyincé, Amanda Ghost, Ian Dench, Jack Splash
- "Hello Beautiful" – Angela Beyincé, Autumn Rowe, Erika Nuri, Markus Alandrus Randle
- "Hot Chocolate" – Angela Beyincé, Shane Pittman, Ruslan Odnoralov
- "I Found Me" – Angela Beyincé, Shane Pittman, James Slater
- "I'll Be Loving You" – Angela Beyincé, Shane Pittman, Charles Harmon
- "I Wanna Feel Love" – Angela Beyincé, Shane Pittman, Alexander Palmer
- "New Religion" – Angela Beyincé, Gigi Rowe, JC Chasez, Jacob Andrew
- "Rainbow" – Angela Beyincé, Shane Pittman, James Slater
- "Something Beautiful" – Angela Beyincé, Shane Pittman, RYKEYZ
- "Stand Strong For You" – Angela Beyincé, Shane Pittman, James Slater
- "Throwback" – Angela Beyincé, Autumn Rowe, Shane Stevens, Hitesh Coen, Kim Ofstad
- "Win Or Lose" – Angela Beyincé, Gabriella Laura Caspi, Alissa Hayden Moreno

== Filmography ==
=== Television ===
Year	Title	Role	Notes	Ref
2020	If Loving You Is Wrong	Pat	Episode S5.03 "Under the Influence"	
2020–Present	Sistas	Pam	72 Episodes (Recurring), 40 Episodes (Series Regular)	
2021	Levi Strauss & Co. "Beauty Of Becoming" TV Campaign Film	Herself	Credited as Angela Beyincé	
2024	Sherri	Herself	Episode S3.18 "BET's Sistas"	

=== Film ===
Year	Title	Role	Notes
2007	The Beyoncé Experience Live	Herself	Cameo
2023	Renaissance: A Film by Beyoncé	Herself	Cameo
2025	Noah's Arc: The Movie	Melissa	

== Awards and nominations ==
Year	Ceremony	Award	Result	Ref
2005	ASCAP Pop Awards	Most-Performed Songs ("Naughty Girl")	Won	
2007	ASCAP Rhythm & Soul Music Awards	Award-winning R&B/Hip-Hop Songs ("Check on It")	Won	
2007	ASCAP Rhythm & Soul Music Awards	Soundtrack Song of the Year ("Check on It")	Won	
2007	ASCAP Pop Awards	Most-Performed Songs ("Check on It")	Won	
2008	ASCAP Rhythm & Soul Music Awards	Award-winning R&B/Hip-Hop Songs ("Get Me Bodied")	Won	
2026	Audie Awards	Audie Award for Autobiography or Memoir (Matriarch: A Memoir)	Won ^{A}	

=== Notes ===
A. ^{A} Audiobook was co-narrated with Tina Knowles, Beyoncé, Solange Knowles & Kelly Rowland.
