= Carlton Gamer =

American composer and music theorist (1929–2023)

- Born: February 13, 1929; Chicago, U.S.
- Died: August 14, 2023 (aged 94)
- Education: Northwestern University; Boston University
- Occupations: Composer; Music theorist
- Organizations: Colorado College; Princeton University; University of Michigan

Carlton Edwin Wesley Gamer (February 13, 1929 – July 14, 2023) was an American composer and music theorist. Gamer composed more than seventy works in a variety of genres, including songs, music for dance, solo piano pieces, chamber music, choral works, orchestral works, and computer music. His compositional approach has been fundamentally shaped by his theoretical interests, the latter influenced by an interest in mathematics.

He taught at Colorado College, Princeton University, and the University of Michigan; he studied at Northwestern University and Boston University and later privately with Roger Sessions.

== Life and career ==
Gamer was born in Chicago on February 13, 1929. He grew up in Champaign-Urbana, Illinois, where his father taught at the University of Illinois. At the age of eight he began to study piano with Tanya Kessler and composition with her husband Hubert Kessler.

From 1942 to 1946, Gamer attended University High School in Bloomington-Normal, Illinois. Simultaneously, he studied piano with two faculty members of Illinois Wesleyan University, first Stefan Bardas and then Chester Barris. In 1946, he graduated as valedictorian.

Gamer studied at Northwestern University, (achieving a bachelor of music in 1950), theory and composition with Frank Cookson and Anthony Donato, and piano with Louis Crowder and Pauline Manchester Lindsey. He obtained his Master's degree in music at Boston University in 1951, after studies of composition with Gardner Read and of musicology with Karl Geiringer. He then worked there as a graduate assistant, teaching a course in orchestration, and served as research assistant for Read's Thesaurus of Orchestral Devices.

In New York City, from 1951 to 1953, Gamer founded a workshop of composer-performers ("The Seven") who met regularly at his home to read through and critique each other's music; they occasionally performed in public. The members were Sheldon Harnick, violin; Gerard Jaffe, viola; Juliette White, cello; Robert Dorough, recorder, flute, and piano; Eric Katz, recorder, Noel Stevens, clarinet, and himself, piano. He was also the pianist, composer, and music director for dancer and choreographer Ilka Suarez and her company.

=== Teacher ===
Gamer taught music at Colorado College from 1954. In 1954 and 1955, he was the accompanist for Hanya Holm's summer dance workshops there. After studying composition privately with Roger Sessions in Princeton, New Jersey, in 1957, Gamer was invited to be a fellow at the Princeton Seminars in Advanced Musical Studies in 1959 and 1960. His recollection of these seminars is found in his article, "Milton at the Princeton Seminars". On leave from Colorado College, Gamer was an Asia Society Fellow at the University of California and in Kyoto, Japan, in 1962–63.

Gamer taught at Princeton University as a visiting lecturer in music in 1974, then as a visiting professor of music in 1976 and 1981. In 1976 he was appointed a Senior Fellow of the Council of Humanities at Princeton. The same year, Gamer received a MacDowell Colony Fellowship.

In 1979 Gamer taught at the Salzburg Global Seminar, in the Musical Ideas and Musical Institutions, in Austria, In 1982, he was visiting professor of Music, teaching a graduate seminar, at the University of Michigan.

Gamer retired from teaching full-time in 1994.

=== Composer ===
==== Performances ====
Gamer's music has been performed in halls including Carnegie Recital Hall, the Kennedy Center in Washington, D.C., and the Los Angeles County Museum of Art, organized by the International Society of Contemporary Music, the Society of Composers, the Current and Modern Consort of the University of Michigan School of Music, and the College Music Society. Works were played at conferences including the San Diego International Computer Music Conference, Southwestern Composers Conference, Colorado College New Music Symposium, and at festivals such as WNYC American Music Festival, the Grand Teton Music Festival, Colorado Contemporary Music Festival, and the Colorado College Summer Music Festival. Abroad, his music has been played in London, Oxford, Rome, Guadalajara, Salzburg, Warsaw, Calcutta, and Sydney.

==== Compositional style ====
Glenn Giffin in The Denver Post described Gamer as proposing in Arkhê

a grand program – creation and evolution...The composer uses various means to present this:...by bands of sound and much shifting back and forth between sections in orchestral drones with now one section and then another receiving prominence...[and] through musical cells that get manipulated and expanded to form a large structure.

According to the American Record Guide "Carlton Gamer's Arkhê freely moves between the poles of tonality and atonality...[its] harmonies [are] often dense to the point of clusters." Fanfare remarked that,

[This] work opens with a long crescendo on the note A (for Alpha, ...) and soon erupts into a Big Bang of fascinating noises. The composer himself describes this piece as using "an externally imposed scheme to derive the duration of each section of the work, [based] upon the miniaturization of a geological time-scale formulated by recent scientific research."

An evolutionary idea also informed Gamer's Choros, as described by Mark Arnest in the Colorado Springs Gazette Telegraph: In Part 1 of this work, Bios, the underlying program deals with the evolution of life; in Part 2, Choros, the evolution of humankind. Bios employs phonemic choral Sprechstimme; Choros instantiates stages in the evolution of vocal polyphony from the Mediaeval era to the present.

Nicholas Kenyon in The New Yorker characterized Quietly, with feeling as "a diatonic piece of neo-Mendelssohnian rhapsody. It managed to sound fresh and new; an old language was used, for once, not with purely nostalgic intent."

Music critic Gilbert Johns, quoted in the Colorado Springs Gazette Telegraph lauded Gamer's innovative approach to composition, which embraces atonalism and its 12-tone variation, known as serial music:

His technique is to rearrange ingeniously what he calls "little pitch cells" into melodic and harmonic entities. He thinks of himself as a composer who has internalized serial technique and given it his own voice... [Thus] he tries to create tonal-sounding music that is serially structured and that gives a richness to the listener's experience.

Edward Rothstein in The New York Times found in Gamer's Piano Râga Music "wit merged with severity". Reviewing a later performance of the same work, Paul Griffiths in The New York Times described it as "hesitating between the worlds of its two dedicatees, Ravi Shankar and Milton Babbitt, before plunging into an immense, flamboyant mix."

Gamer himself, in his article "ET Setera" (p. 60), wrote of his "interests as a composer of music in ETS 12"—i.e., the twelve-tone equal-tempered system:

In recent years these interests have centered more and more upon the attainment in the pitch domain of a sense of "less-than-twelveness" embedded in "twelveness". I have become increasingly preoccupied with the properties of certain subcollections of pitches or pitch classes chosen from the universe of pitches within our system and the relationship of such subcollections to that system.

In his Notes on the Structure of Piano Râga Music (p. 218), for example, Gamer showed how that work employs a 24-tone set generated from a single trichord. In Lieder to texts by Rainer Maria Rilke he employs all-trichord sets, each containing an all-interval tetrad, enabling him to embed quotations from tonal music into the serial texture.

Gamer composed music in equal-tempered systems other than ETS 12. Robin Wilson, in his Gresham College lecture on music and mathematics, discussed Gamer's use of the 31-tone equal-tempered system in ORGANUM and of the seven-point projective plane in Fanovar.

In the rhythmic domain, Gamer sometimes employed serialization or the use of recursive sequences—e.g., in Quietly, with feeling or Duetude.

== Music theorist ==
As a music theorist, Gamer published articles in a number of journals and books on such topics as electronic music, microtonality, the properties of equal-tempered systems containing more or less than twelve tones per octave, and the definition and elaboration of the deep scale property as it applies to such equal-tempered systems; definitions of the concepts of difference set, block design, and projective plane and applications of these to such equal-tempered systems, Musical block designs, and Microtones and projective planes; the relationship between geometrical duality and musical inversion; invariance matrices and their application to musical composition; and musical metatheory, with emphasis on the notion of syntactic models and the prescriptive and postdictive relevance of these to a theory of composition.

Gamer's wrote music-theoretical sections for dictionaries and encyclopedias, including the Dictionary of Contemporary Music, Encyclopædia Britannica, Grove Music Online, and The New Grove Dictionary of Music and Musicians.

Gamer's work has been cited in books and dissertations by Robert Morris, Andrew Mead, Timothy A. Johnson, Jack Douthett et al., and Robert Tyler Kelley, among others, and in numerous articles in a variety of journals, including Journal of Music Theory, Music Theory Spectrum, Perspectives of New Music, Music Analysis, Intégral, Music & Letters, Music Theory Online, Journal of the American Musicological Society, and College Music Symposium.

Gamer has been credited with early contributions to diatonic set theory. Morris, in his article on "Mathematics and the twelve-tone system", wrote:

While the twelve-tone system is no longer isolated from other aspects of music theory, there are many research projects that can be identified to carry on previous work. One obvious direction is to ask what happens when we change the '12' in 'twelve-tone system'? Carlton Gamer [in "Some combinational resources" (1967) and "Deep scales and difference sets" (1967)] was one of the first theorists to raise such issues. He showed that equal tempered systems of other moduli not only have different structures, they allow different types of combinatorial entities to be built within them.

Johnson termed Gamer a "precursor" in this area:

Students who wish to trace the historical development of diatonic set theory might begin with Milton Babbitt, an important American composer and theorist...Later, Carlton Gamer explored some fundamental aspects of the structure and nature of the diatonic collection – in particular, the notion of deep scales...

Douthett, Martha M. Hyde, and Charles J. Smith, in their introduction to Music Theory and Mathematics, also observed that "Milton Babbitt and Carlton Gamer, among others, had noticed intriguing structural properties of the diatonic system when considered as a subset of the equal-tempered chromatic scale."

Gamer sometimes illustrated his theoretical ideas with short compositions, as in "Fanfare for the common tone" or "ET Setera". Wilson Coker, in his review of the latter, wrote: "Gamer's article might almost a be a model for theorists in its subtle blend of the most abstract inquiry along with indications of useful application."

== Compositions ==
- Fifty pieces for solo piano, voice, chamber ensembles, or orchestra (1937–1947)
- Nocturne for cello and piano (1944, revised 1992)
- "Wer nie sein Brot mit Tränen aß" (J. W. von Goethe, from Wilhelm Meister's Apprenticeship) for soprano and baritone duet and piano (1945)
- "Go where glory waits thee" (Thomas Moore) for mezzo-soprano and piano (1945)
- "Reverie" (Langston Hughes) for mezzo-soprano or baritone and piano (1946)
- "Sea Charm" (Langston Hughes) for mezzo-soprano or baritone and piano (1946)
- Two songs from A Shropshire Lad" (A. E. Housman) for tenor and piano: "Along the field as we came by" and "On your midnight pallet lying" (1946)
- "Drink in the beauty of this night" (Ream Lazaro) for baritone and piano (1946)
- Fragments for piano or harpsichord (1947, 1984)
- Barcarolle and Chaconne for piano (1947–1949)
- Sonnet: "Oh, never say that I was false of heart" (William Shakespeare) for tenor and piano (1948, 1969)
- Two Songs to texts by Li Po for mezzo-soprano and flute: "On hearing the flute at Lo-Cheng one spring night" (1948, 1990) and "In the mountains" (1990)
- "After two years" (Richard Aldington) for tenor and piano (1949)
- "A dream of death" (William Butler Yeats) song for baritone or mezzo-soprano and piano (1949)
- String Quartet (1950, revised and re-entitled "Between Heaven and Earth", 2012)
- Pastorale for flute, clarinet, and strings (1950–51)
- Fantasy for Orchestra (1951, revised and re-entitled Generation, 2012–13)
- Conversation for flute (or recorder) and piano (1952)
- Serenade for flute, violin, and clarinet (1952, revised 1964)
- Theme and Variations for Clarinet and Piano (1953)
- Fantasy for Flute, Clarinet, and Piano (1953)
- Aria da Capo (composition for dance with narrator) (text by Ilka Suarez and Carlton Gamer, after Edna St. Vincent Millay's 1919 play) (1953, revised 1986)
- The Block Dwellers for piano (composition for dance) (1954)
- Dance for Three Couples for violin, clarinet, and piano (composition for dance) (1954)
- Two Things (Neo-Platonic Soliloquy) (Donald Babcock) (a cappella choir) (1957, revised 1988)
- Three Haiku by Bashô (a cappella choir). The Colorado College Music Press (1958)
- Rhyme from Grandma Goose (Annamarie Ewing) for tenor and piano (1958)
- Three songs for soprano and piano (1958):
  - "Each more melodious note I hear" (H. D. Thoreau)
  - "o sweet spontaneous earth" (e. e. cummings)
  - "Passing" (Lillian de la Torre, from Guillaume Apollinaire)
- "Lo, in the silent night" (Angelus Silesius) carol for two voices a cappella (1959)
- Duetude for flute and clarinet (1959, revised 1998)
- Violin Sonata (1959–1960)
- Octet for String Quartet and Wind Quartet (1960)
- Sonata Breve for piano (1961)
- Canonettes for keyboard, or clarinet (or viola) and cello (or bassoon) (1962, revised 1992)
- Piano Râga Music (for Milton Babbitt and Ravi Shankar) (1962, 1967,1970).
- Laudate Dominum (Psalm 116, Vulgate) for a cappella choir. The Colorado College Music Press (1963)
- Arkhê for orchestra (1968 / 1993)
- War is the enemy (Carlton Gamer) (rock refrain) (1968)
- Mid-century Love Letter (Phyllis McGinley) for soprano and piano (1969)
- There is a Spirit – in memoriam A. J. Muste (James Nayler) (a cappella choir) (1970)
- Lieder for baritone voice, oboe, cello, and horn to texts by Rainer Maria Rilke:
  - "Liebeslied" (voice, oboe, cello) (1971)
  - "Herbsttag" (voice, oboe, cello, horn) (1983)
- Dear Friend (Carlton Gamer) for soprano and piano (1972)
- Variation on a Thing by JKR for digital synthesis in 7-tone equal temperament (1974).
- From the Gardens of the West, three pieces for piano
  - Of Time Past (1978)
  - Our Second Music (1978)
  - Quietly, with Feeling (after Mendelssohn) (1976)
- Fanfare for the Common Tone (x3) for two trumpets (1976).
- Mondi for piano (1983)
- I'll Remember April (after Raye, DePaul, and Johnston) for piano (April, 1987)
- New Beginnings (1987)
  - Part I: Organum from Canto LXXXI (Ezra Pound) for digitally synthesized voice in 31-tone equal temperament (1976)
  - Part II: New Beginnings for piano and percussion (Cameo (for S. G.) for piano (1991))
- Gahu on J, K, R (for James K. Randall) for speaking chorus and African percussion ensemble (1991)
- Star in Clay (Katharine Lee Bates) for choir, brass, and timpani (1993)
- Fanovar for flute, oboe, clarinet, trumpet, trombone, violin and cello – or for digital synthesis in 7-tone equal temperament (1994)
- For Elaine for piano (1999, 2004)
- Choros for chamber chorus, string quartet, early instruments, piano, organ, and percussion, with incidental vocal solos and speaker:(1999)
  - Part I: Bios (Carlton Gamer)
  - Part II: Choros (James Nayler, Anaximander Gospel of John, St. Augustine, Heloise, Dante, San Juan de la Cruz. Rainer Maria Rilke, and Anna Akhmatova) (1999)
- Quattro Voci (per Quattro Mani) (for Susan Grace and Alice Rybak) for two pianos (2009)
- Mountains and Skies (Montes et caeli): a CC fanfare for concert band (2016)

== Publications ==
- "The New Fact and the Creative Life" (essay), The Colorado Quarterly, University of Colorado, Boulder (1961).
- "Some Combinational Resources of Equal-Tempered Systems", Journal of Music Theory, vol. 11, no. 1 (Spring 1967), pp. 32–59.
- "Deep scales and difference sets in equal-tempered systems". American Society of University Composers. Proceedings, vol. 2 (1967), pp. 113–122.
- "Electronic music," Encyclopædia Britannica (1968 edition).
- "The role of the composer as theorist: Some introductory remarks." American Society of University Composers. Proceedings, vol. 7 (1972), pp. 12–14.
- "Flawed words and stubborn sounds: a conversation with Elliott Carter", (review essay), Perspectives of New Music, vol. 11, no. 2 (Spring–Summer, 1973)
- "Notes on the structure of Piano Râga Music", Perspectives of New Music, vol. 12, no. 2 (Spring–Summer, 1974).
- "Fanfares for the common tone" (with Paul Lansky), Perspectives of New Music, vol. 14–15, no. 1–2 (1976), pp. 228–235.
- "Sketch of a foundation for music theory today." College Music Symposium, vol. XVII/1 (Spring 1977) 153–156.
- "Et setera: some temperamental speculations," Music Theory: Special Topics, ed. Richmond Browne, Academic Press (1981), pp. 59–81. ISBN 0-12-138080-7.
- "Music Worlds," Semiotic Investigations: Proceedings of a Mellon Faculty Seminar, The Colorado College Studies 18 (1982), pp. 83–98.
- "Busnois, Brahms, and the Syntax of Temporal Proportions" (essay), A Festschrift for Albert Seay, ed. Michael Grace, Colorado College, Colorado Springs, CO (1982), pp. 201–215.
- "Musical Block Designs" (with Robin J. Wilson), Ars Combinatoria, vol. 16-A (December 1983), pp. 217–225.
- "Trapezoidal Numbers" (with David W. Roeder and John J. Watkins), Mathematics Magazine, vol. 58, no. 2 (March 1985), pp. 108–110.
- "Displacement as matrix and matter of twentieth century arts," in Frank Brinkhaus and Sascha Talmor, eds.: Memory, History and Critique. European Identity at the Millennium. Proceedings of the 6th International Society for the Study of European Ideas (ISSEI) Conference at the University for Humanist Studies, Utrecht, The Netherlands, MIT Press (August. 1996).
- "Composers of the Nazi Era: Eight Portraits" (book review), Shofar: An Interdisciplinary Journal of Jewish Studies, vol. 20, no. 3 (Spring 2002), pp. 123–125.
- "Microtones and Projective Planes" (with Robin Wilson), Music and Mathematics, ed. John Fauvel, Raymond Flood, Robin J. Wilson, Oxford University Press (2003).
- "Milton at the Princeton Seminars" in Milton Babbitt: A Composers' Memorial; Scores and Texts in Memoriam, Perspectives of New Music, special supplement to vol. 49/2, and Open Space, special issue 14 (Spring 2012), pp. 361–364.
- "How Du You Compose Yourself?", Perspectives of New Music, vol 57, issue 1-2, (Winter 2019) pp.579-590

== Discography ==
- Janáček, Bloch, Gamer: Violin & Piano Sonatas; Crystal Records; ASIN: B000003J5E
- MMC New Century, vol. 13; Master Musicians Col; ASIN: B00003L9JB
- Society of Composers, Inc: View from the Keyboard; Capstone; ASIN: B00005YCDV
- Harmony for a New World; Innova; ASIN: B0002L56MO
