= Rap-singing =

Type of musical delivery involving sung vocals combined with rhythmic speech

Rap-singing (also referred to as sing-rapping or sing-rap) is a vocal technique that combines rapping with sung or pitch altered vocals. While melodic vocal performances have appeared in hip-hop since its inception, rap-singing became more identifiable in the late 1980s and 1990s amid the rise of R&B and hip-hop hybrid styles like new jack swing. Some writers have traced its roots to earlier traditions in African American music, such as scat singing and 1970s funk and soul.

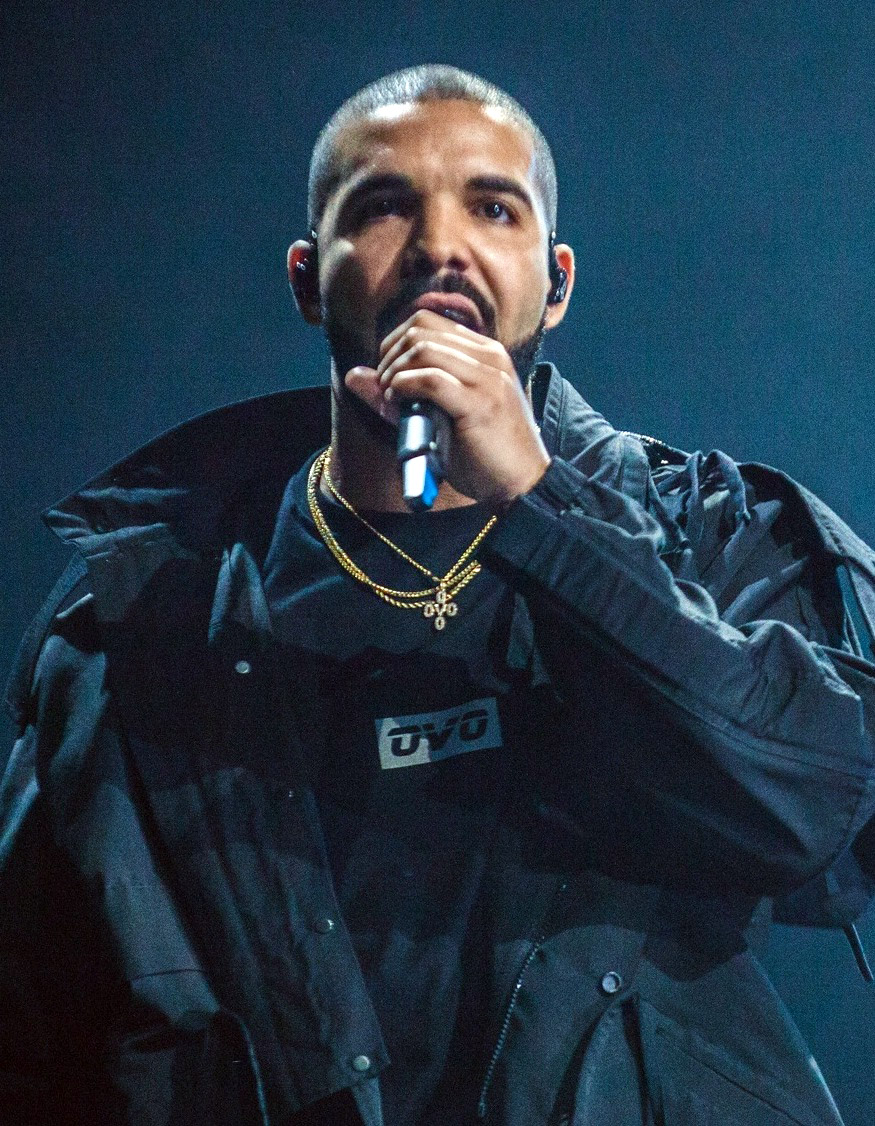
Canadian rapper and singer Drake is often considered to have popularized rap-singing.

Rap-singing rose to prominence in hip-hop, pop, and R&B by the 1990s and 2000s through artists such as Lauryn Hill, Missy Elliott, Beyoncé, Bone Thugs-n-Harmony, André 3000, Destiny's Child, T-Pain, Nelly, and Ja Rule, expanding further in the 2010s through Drake, Future, Rihanna, Ariana Grande, Frank Ocean, Juice Wrld, and XXXTentacion, and in the 2020s with Bad Bunny, PinkPantheress, Don Toliver, SZA, and, to slightly lesser known audiences, artists like brakence & grandson. The technique has been influential in the development of several subgenres, such as hip-hop soul, melodic rap, trap soul, and alternative R&B, while also appearing in Latin subgenres like merenhouse and reggaeton. Rap-singing has sparked debates regarding genre classification of artists who have used it.

== Etymology ==
One of the earliest known uses of the term "rap-singing" appeared in an August 1981 issue of Musician, where Jon Pareles describes The Treacherous Three as "rap-singing their own lyrics". In 1983, a Billboard writer used "semi rap-sung" to describe "Ladies Hot Line", performed by The Weather Girls and co-written by Diana Ross.

By 1990, related terminology appeared in radio trade publications. In an issue of The Gavin Report, the phrase "melodic rap" was used in promotional coverage, with the publication stating that "as hip-hop advances musically as well as lyrically, we're hearing more melodic rap compositions". By late 1994, rap-singing was officially recognized as a style of music in New York Magazine.

== Terminology and usage ==
Rap-singing is a style of vocal delivery that fuses the rhythmic, spoken cadence of rap with songlike singing. One description from The New York Times defined the style as: "singing as rapping, rapping as singing, singing and rapping all woven together into one holistic whole."

It has been compared by music journalists to broader talk-singing or speech-song techniques, which have been described by The Guardian as "spoken singing". Other terms include Sprechgesang and Sprechstimme, which emerged in the early 20th century and were used to describe vocal techniques employed by composers such as Arnold Schoenberg. Writing for The Ringer, Zach Schonfeld characterized "talk-singing" as occupying "a nebulous space between" speech and melody, and noted that many contemporary performers acknowledge hip-hop as an influence on their spoken vocal delivery.

== Characteristics ==
Although rapping and singing have historically been seen as two separate musical styles, some music theorists have argued that vocal pitch operates as an independent structural parameter in rap flow, alongside rhythm and rhyme.

In the journal Intégral, Robert Komaniecki notes that while rap is often described as rhythmically delivered, "imprecisely pitched" speech, many rappers manipulate pitch in ways that blur the lines between rapping and singing. He proposes a continuum ranging from speech-like declamation to fully sung or chanted delivery.

He also identifies "rhyme strengthening", in which rhymed syllables are delivered within similar relative pitch zones, creating a structural layer parallel to lyrical rhyme. More overt forms of pitch organization include "sung interjections", brief shifts into clearly tonal singing aligned with the harmonic center of the instrumental track. At the most song-oriented end are "sung or chanted verses", in which delivery occurs on one or more fixed pitches corresponding to the track's key structure. He argues that these techniques complicate categorical distinctions between rap and song.

In The Musical Artistry of Rap, rap performance is described along a "singing–speech spectrum". The author contends that some rap vocals retain speech-derived rhythmic stress while articulating identifiable pitch relationships within a musical key. Analyses of melodic rap delivery identify tonal centers, intervallic motion, repetition, and measurable pitch organization alongside speech-like rhythmic flow.

Vocal pedagogy texts have identified related technical features. In Teaching Singing in the 21st Century, vocal styles influenced by rap are associated with pitch bending, sliding between tones, dynamic variation, and heightened consonant articulation.

== History ==
=== 1970s–late 1980s: origins and early precursors ===
Rap-singing draws from African American musical traditions that blend rhythmic speech and melody. Writing for Tidal, one critic traced the convergence of rapping and singing to earlier blues and jazz traditions, citing Ella Fitzgerald as a vocalist who moved fluidly between banter, melodic storytelling, and rhythmic scatting. Some journalists have argued The Jubalaires are key precursors to hip-hop. Writing in Billboard in 1992, Timothy White described Melvin Van Peebles' 1968 album Brer Soul as laying "the foundation of the modern rap ethos", with the Last Poets and Gil Scott-Herondeveloping comparable "metered musical monologs" soon after.

Many commentators have referenced late 1960s and early 1970s recordings by James Brown as influential to hip-hop's development. Writing retrospectively, Pitchfork cited Brown's appearance on Afrika Bambaataa's 1984 single "Unity" as confirmation of his impact on hip-hop, stating that "it was hardly a leap at all from his vocal style in the early 70s to rapping".

Writers have often credited Millie Jackson's singing style as a precursor to hip-hop, referring to her as the "Godmother of rap". In a Vibe feature, her "rapping" was described as long dialogue during song breaks, a style the article noted had been popular in soul music with artists such as Isaac Hayes. According to Jackson, her label encouraged her to further experiment with the emerging rap style after the 1979 single "Rapper's Delight" became a commercial success. In 1980, she recorded "I Had to Say It", which she later described as a spoof of "Rapper's Delight".

During the early inception of hip-hop, several groups incorporated harmonies in their rap performances such as The Cold Crush Brothers and Whodini, while The Force MDs occasionally incorporated rap in their music. The Sequencereleased rap tracks featuring sung vocals, including "Funk You Up", and frequently repurposed hooks from funk and soul recordings in their music. The group's Angie B achieved commercial success later in the 1990s neo soulmovement, under the name Angie Stone.

Punk band Blondie often experimented with hip-hop sounds, releasing one of the earliest examples of rap-singing with their 1981 single "Rapture". The following year, rapper Kurtis Blow released the pop rap single "Daydreamin" with fully sung vocals in an attempt to crossover. During this period, some record labels turned to white artists to create pop-oriented rap, with artists such as Teena Marie, Tom Tom Club and Beastie Boys, all beginning to explore hip-hop elements in their work. Sylvia Robinson claimed that radio programmers were more accepting of "Rapture" than the releases from her label Sugar Hill Records.

In Doug E. Fresh's 1985 track "La Di Da Di", Slick Rick uses animated sing-song flow and repurposed the hook from A Taste of Honey's version of "Sukiyaki". Biz Markie followed a similar approach with his intentionally imperfect vocal performance on the 1989 single "Just a Friend", with song's producer stating "I got [Biz] in the booth and he was singing, and even though it might not be perfectly correct to anybody else, the feeling of it was good."

LL Cool J's 1987 ballad "I Need Love" is also cited as an early mainstream example of rapping integrated with singing. Simultaneously, Run-DMC became an MTV staple, crossing over to pop audiences.

Producers like Teddy Riley crafted the sound of New Jack Swing, which was a fusion of R&B melodic vocals with hip-hop beats. It blurred genre lines and began dominating mainstream R&B radio by the late-1980s. Bobby Brown's 1989 hit "On Our Own" showcased him alternating between rap and singing. Musicians including Guy and Bell Biv DeVoe helped continue the trend into the early 1990s.

=== 1990s: pioneers of rap-singing ===
The 1990s saw a rise of artists who alternated between singing and rapping, increasing its commercial visibility. P.M. Dawn, The Pharcyde, Queen Latifah and other artists associated with alternative rap further softened the line between singing and rapping. In 1992, The New York Times described a "sharp turn back to melody" within hip-hop, citing Arrested Development and De La Soul among artists who bridged pop and hip-hop through "melody and speech, sampled snippets and live instruments". The article also observed that sample clearances had come under legal scrutiny, leading some artists to "rediscover the beauty and adaptability of live instruments" and experiment with their voices.

Subsequently, Mary J. Blige's debut album What's the 411? (1992) helped popularize hip-hop soul, where soulful singing was paired with rap beats and hip-hop elements. Mariah Carey began employing rappers to make featured verses on her pop oriented music. TLC spent the decade blending the harmonies of members Rozonda "Chili" Thomas and Tionne "T-Boz" Watkins with Lisa "Left Eye" Lopes delivering rap verses on hits like "Ain't 2 Proud to Beg", "Waterfalls", and "No Scrubs".

In New York's Dominican-American communities, groups such as Proyecto Uno developed merenhouse, a hybrid style combining merengue instrumentation with house production and bilingual rap-singing. Their music blended Spanglish rap verses with sung hooks and sampled disco and hip-hop recordings by Black artists.

While early artists laid the groundwork, rap-singing became more prominent in the mid-to-late 1990s through artists who blended rapping and full-fledged singing as equal components of their sound. Bone Thugs-n-Harmony developed a harmonized gospel-like rapping style. Their rapid-paced vocal approach, heard on the 1996 single "Tha Crossroads", is often cited as an advancement of melodic rap. Simultaneously, Nate Dogg gained mainstream attention for his work on Warren G's "Regulate", and continued singing hooks for artists such as Snoop Dogg and Dr. Dre. Time stated that his voice was among "the most memorable male vocalizing in rap history". Another mainstream artist who many claim pioneered rap-singing was Ol' Dirty Bastard.

Some critics have argued that women played a central role in advancing rap-singing during the 1990s, citing Lauryn Hill, Missy Elliott, and Beyoncé as key figures. Scholars have also noted that MCing has historically been associated with Black masculinity within hip-hop, while singing has more often been associated with pop and R&B vocal performances. Following the success of The Score, Spin wrote in 1997 that Lauryn Hill of Fugees was arguably "the first dominant female rapper (with apologies to Queen Latifah)", and stated that her integration of hip-hop and R&B "naturally expands both genres". Hill emerged as a central figure in bringing the style into the mainstream with her debut solo album The Miseducation of Lauryn Hill (1998). Songs like "Doo Wop (That Thing)" and "Everything Is Everything" showcased shifts between rapping and singing within the same compositions.

In 1999, Billboard renamed its R&B charts to R&B/Hip-Hop Singles & Tracks and Top R&B/Hip-Hop Albums, while noting the overlap between rap and R&B audiences. The publication described Hill as "the prime example" of an act that blurred the genre distinctions. That year, MTV introduced a hip-hop category at the Video Music Awards, separate from rap, and cited acts with both rap and R&B elements such as Hill and TLC as examples.

Missy Elliott introduced a more quirky style of rap-singing into her music with Supa Dupa Fly (1997), Da Real World(1999) and Miss E... So Addictive (2001). Primarily a rapper, Elliott positioned singing as central to her music, from tracks like "One Minute Man". Alongside Elliott, other artists also developed their own distinct approaches to rap-singing, such as CeeLo Green, with both Goodie Mob and Gnarls Barkley.

Destiny's Child's founding members Beyoncé, Kelly Rowland, LeToya Luckett and LaTavia Roberson often toggled between fast-paced speech and melodic rhythms that resembled rap verses on songs like "Bug a Boo", "Say My Name", and "Jumpin', Jumpin'". According to the Fugees' Wyclef Jean, he encouraged Destiny's Child to adopt a rap-singing approach on their 1998 remix single "No, No, No (Part 2)", drawing inspiration from Houston rappers. In a 2011 interview, Beyoncé reflected on this stylistic choice, stating "Those melodies and that fast, staccato way of singing created a new style. It inspired a whole movement in R&B". Beyoncé incorporated rap-adjacent cadences in her solo releasessuch as "Kitty Kat" (2006), "Diva" (2008), "Apeshit" (2018) and "Savage (remix)" (2020).

=== 2000s: mainstream popularization ===
André 3000 of OutKast adopted a predominantly sung vocal approach on Speakerboxxx/The Love Below (2003), largely departing from traditional rap. The A.V. Club described his "unusually musical flow" as having "always bordered on singing" in his earlier work, while noting that on the album he explored styles including "pre-rock crooning", "acoustic jazz-soul", and "lovesexy funk". Billboard credited the album with having "pioneered emo weirdo-rap singing", noting songs such as "Prototype" and "Hey Ya".

Ja Rule similarly used this technique during his collaborations with Ashanti and alternated between rapped verses and sung hooks on his own singles. In 2002, the Grammy Award for Best Rap/Sung Collaboration was introduced. Ja Rule and Case were among the inaugural nominees in that category for their single "Livin' It Up". Nelly explored rap-singing within southern hip-hop in many of his recordings including "Ride wit Me" and "Dilemma". His vocal performance was described as "almost like a country singer with a street twist".

Pop artists including Madonna and Britney Spears used rap-style passages in their music, with Gwen Stefani alleged to have written "Hollaback Girl" as a rap-oriented diss track aimed at Courtney Love. The Black Eyed Peas became popular with upbeat pop music after beginning as a rap group. On Ciara's 2004 single "1, 2 Step" featuring Missy Elliott, the performers traded rap segments over a crunk-influenced R&B instrumental. Elliott, who co-wrote the song, later explained that she encouraged Ciara to alternate between singing and rapping to accommodate the choreography-heavy performance style. Justin Timberlake's 2006 single "SexyBack", produced with Timbaland, featured a pitch-altered vocal delivery. Fergie's The Dutchess (2006) included rap verses on tracks such as "Fergalicious" and "London Bridge".

Auto-Tune was widely used during this period. Stereogum credited T-Pain with popularizing the use of the effect with the release of his albums Rappa Ternt Sanga (2005) and Epiphany (2007). The publication added that some artists who were not traditionally regarded as singers used the effect to explore vocal ideas they might otherwise have assigned to featured vocalists. Lil Wayne also used Auto-Tune for his 2008 single "Lollipop". That same year, Kanye West released 808s & Heartbreak. Consequence argued that the album helped develop "indie R&B or electropop or whatever you want to call it", adding "808s' is flooded with R&B and it digitizes the raw emotion and isolated feelings that [James Blake and the Weeknd] have carved their brands out of today".

In the late 2000s, Phonte of Little Brother and The-Dream rapped and sang on their recordings. Writing for Billboard, Chris Payne described 2009 as a year in which Kid Cudi helped foreground vulnerability and heartbreak within hip-hop through Man on the Moon: The End of Day (2009). One critic, writing for HotNewHipHop, described the album as featuring "transcendent melodies".

=== 2010s–present: contemporary dominance ===
By the 2010s, rap-singing was widely present in mainstream music, as well as in musical theatre, including Hamilton(2015), which featured actors rapping before breaking into song. Drake became a central figure in 2010s rap-singing. Professor Mark Anthony Neal said Drake's rap-singing differed from the Auto-Tune style commonly used in popular music in the late 2000s, arguing that he "brought it back to the actual body". His 2011 album Take Care helped expand the use of this technique during the decade, while his hybrid R&B and hip-hop songs "Marvins Room", "Started From the Bottom", "Hold On, We're Going Home", "God's Plan", and "In My Feelings", became chart hits. In 2020, Elias Leight of Rolling Stone wrote that following the release of Take Care, "now nearly every singer raps, and nearly every rapper sings", adding that many artists have “borrowed or copied the template" established by the album.

Nicki Minaj achieved commercial success with singles like "Super Bass" and "Starships" that utilized rap-singing. Hot 97 DJ Peter Rosenberg criticized "Starships" as "not real hip-hop", leading Minaj and other Young Money artists to withdraw from the Summer Jam festival lineup. Minaj continued rap-singing in her music, such as 2014's "Pills n Potions".

Bryson Tiller paired trap production with melodic elements and rap verses on his 2015 album TRAPSOUL. Male artists such as 6LACK, Ty Dolla $ign, Tory Lanez, and Brent Faiyaz used similar approaches within contemporary R&B and hip-hop. Frank Ocean has been noted for his singer-songwriter take on rap-singing, particularly on tracks such as "Nights" and "Chanel". His work during this period often toggled between R&B, pop, indie rock, EDM and hip-hop sonically, helping shape alternative R&B.

Future helped popularize what critics described as a melodic, Auto-Tune-focused vocal style often labeled "mumble rap". Referring to him as a "rapper/singer", Pitchfork writer Jordan Sargent named him "one of the foremost sources of rap that's as peculiar as it is pop". In an interview with Complex, Future stated "when I first used Auto-Tune, I never used it to sing. I wasn't using it the way T-Pain was. I used it to rap because it makes my voice sound grittier. Now everybody wants to rap in Auto-Tune". This style became popular within hip-hop, with artists such as Post Malone and Travis Scott following similar sonic trends, while Lil Uzi Vert, Young Thug, and Juice Wrld brought in elements of emo rap and pop. Writing for Stereogum, one critic noted that Ariana Grande's "7 Rings" alternates between "old Broadway melody" and "almost-rap cadences", arguing that while in previous years pop artists would enlist a rapper for verses, audiences "were used to hearing rapping and singing as the same thing by 2019".

==== 2020s ====
By the 2020s, rap-singing had become a standard vocal technique across hip-hop, R&B, and pop used by artists including Doja Cat, Lizzo, and Anderson .Paak. In 2020, journalist Tom Breihan wrote "rapping and singing merged long ago into one amorphous, gelatinous whole. We're now in the second or third generation of sing-rappers absolutely dominating the charts. That's baked in. Today's youngest rap stars have never known a different reality." SZA frequently merges conversational rap cadences with R&B vocals. Songs like "Low" (2022) and "Smoking on My Ex Pack" (2022) showcase this influence in modern R&B. Kendrick Lamar often utilizes melodic singing when exploring themes of love and intimacy in his music, such as "LOVE." and "Luther". By contrast, Rod Wave usually raps and sings about heartbreak and depression.

Rap-singing has since gained global recognition, influencing vocal styles in K-pop and Afrobeats, with performers like Burna Boy and members of BTS rapping and singing interchangeably. Bad Bunny and other Latin trap artists blend Spanish-language rapping and singing with reggaeton. British artist PinkPantheress pairs quick, spoken lines with subtle singing over UK garage production, defined as "Alt-Girl Rap" by Rolling Stone.

While not as generally well known to most audiences, underground experimental artists like brakence & grandson, known for their blends of sing-rapping with elements of Emo rap & Hyperpop, have gained followings over the 2020s.

== Controversies ==
Some early critical responses were dismissive of attempts to incorporate singing into rap. In a 1981 article, journalist Jon Pareles criticized rappers who attempted to incorporate singing, writing that some "hedge their bets by trying to sing, a move that's invariably disastrous". He described The Sequence as having "rapped a little and, unfortunately, sang a lot", while characterizing their ballads as "glacially slow". In the early 2000s, 50 Cent publicly criticized Ja Rule for incorporating singing into his style, accusing him of lacking credibility as a rapper. In a 2007 interview, Ja Rule alleged that 50 Cent had adopted elements of his melodic approach, with some publications citing that his 2003 single "21 Questions", was similar to Ja Rule's earlier output. In a 2011 MTV News interview, Ja Rule jokingly apologized for helping popularize melodic rap, describing himself as a "shallow singer".

The use of Auto-Tune in rap-singing has also drawn criticism. T-Pain, who helped popularize the effect in the mid-2000s, received both acclaim and backlash. He later revealed that fellow artist Usher told him his use of Auto-Tune "ruined music", a comment that he claimed contributed to a period of his depression. Jay-Z's 2009 single "D.O.A. (Death of Auto-Tune)" also critiqued the growing reliance on vocal processing, rapping that rappers were "singin' too much" and urging them to "get back to rap" before stating that they were "T-Pain-in' too much".

A 2010 satirical article from The Village Voice ranked "the best worst singing rappers", lightly mocked artists like Biz Markie, The Notorious B.I.G., Slick Rick, and Flavor Flav for their off-key singing performances while acknowledging their cultural impact. The article observed that by the early 2010s, rap-singing had become normalized, writing "these days, there's nothing attention grabbing about rappers who sing".

As rap-singing became a foundational feature of both hip-hop and R&B by the 2020s, some questioned whether genre boundaries still hold meaning. Writing for Billboard, Naima Cochrane argued that a decade of "trap&B" influenced music in the 2010s led to "the complete obliteration of the line between R&B songs where the singer is rap-singing and rap songs where the rapper is sing-rapping — or both." Early in her career, Nicki Minaj claimed to have faced industry skepticism for blending rapping with singing. In her 2009 song "Can Anybody Hear Me?", she recalled being dismissed by executives, rapping: "Def Jam said I'm no Lauryn Hill / Can't rap and sing on the same CD / The public won't get it, they got A.D.D".

Drake has frequently claimed to be the first rapper to successfully merge rapping and singing. The claim has been disputed by music outlets, who cited artists such as Lauryn Hill, Missy Elliott, and André 3000 as early pioneers, while rapper Logic publicly thanked Drake for paving the way for artists who use the technique. His crossover success has also sparked debates about his genre status, with some critics labeling him a pop artist. Rapper Yasiin Bey stated "Drake is pop to me, in the sense like, if I was in Target in Houston and I heard a Drake song… it feels like a lot of his music is compatible with shopping. Or shopping with an edge in certain instances".

Questions have also surrounded the classification of other artists whose work blends multiple genres. Lauryn Hill's work has been at the center of debates about whether it should be classified hip-hop, R&B, or both, with fellow rapper Trinastating she doesn't consider Hill a rapper. Similarly, André 3000's 2023 instrumental album New Blue Sun sparked further discourse about his placement in hip-hop, particularly after he expressed to Hanif Abdurraqib that rapping sometimes felt inauthentic to him. "The backlash is actually not from the rap community, or the jazz and spiritual jazzcommunity. There's actually more support — surprising support — from both sides", he told the Chicago Tribune.

Genre labeling remains a contentious issue for contemporary artists. SZA, often categorized as an R&B artist, has voiced frustration over being confined to the label, viewing it as reductive and rooted in racial assumptions. In a 2021 interview with Rolling Stone, Doja Cat responded to critics questioning her rap credentials due to her success in pop and R&B, stating: "Anyone who says that I'm not a rapper is in denial".
