= Beyoncé singles discography =

Singles by American singer

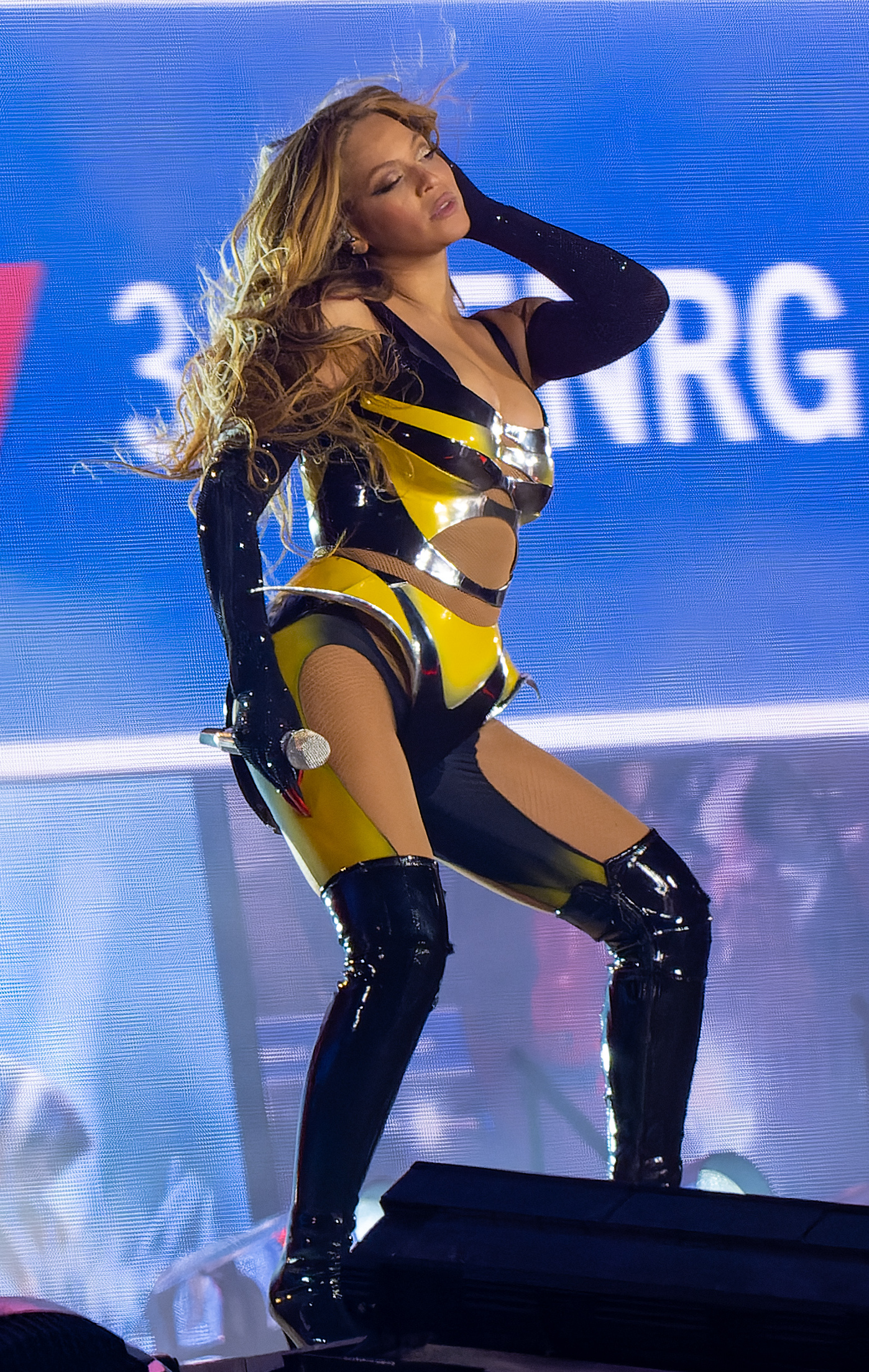
- Beyoncé performing during the Renaissance World Tour, 2023
- As lead artist: 60
- As featured artist: 17
- Promotional singles: 14
- Charity singles: 6
- Other charted and certified songs: 49

American singer Beyoncé has released 60 singles as lead artist, 17 singles as a featured artist, 14 promotional singles, and six charity singles. According to the Recording Industry Association of America (RIAA), Beyoncé has sold 161.5 million singles as a lead artist in the United States, and is the most RIAA-certified female artist in history. To date, she has sold over 200 million records (including digital sales) worldwide, making her one of the best-selling music artists of all time.

Beyoncé's career began as one of the main vocalists of Destiny's Child. She released her first solo album, Dangerously in Love (2003), during the hiatus of Destiny's Child. It produced the singles "Crazy in Love", "Baby Boy", "Me, Myself and I", "Naughty Girl" and "The Closer I Get to You". With "Crazy in Love" and Dangerously in Love, Beyoncé became the first female artist—and the fifth artist ever—to top both the singles and albums charts simultaneously in the United States and the United Kingdom. In 2003, "Crazy in Love" and "Baby Boy" peaked at number one on the US Billboard Hot 100 for eight and nine weeks, respectively.

After the disbandment of Destiny's Child in 2005, the single "Check on It" featuring Slim Thug was released for The Pink Panther soundtrack. The single topped the US Billboard Hot 100 chart for five weeks, and was later included on her second studio album, B'Day (2006), which produced six singles, including top-ten hits "Déjà Vu", "Irreplaceable" and "Beautiful Liar". "Ring the Alarm" became Beyoncé's highest debut on the US Billboard Hot 100 chart, entering at number twelve in 2006, whereas "Irreplaceable" remained at the top of the same chart for ten consecutive weeks in 2006–07, becoming her longest-running single at the pole position of the chart.

Beyoncé's third album, I Am... Sasha Fierce (2008) included the singles "If I Were a Boy", "Single Ladies (Put a Ring on It)", which topped the US Billboard Hot 100 chart for four weeks, "Halo" and "Sweet Dreams". Beyoncé's fourth studio album, 4, was released in June 2011. The album's first single was "Run the World (Girls)"; although it did not reach the top twenty of the US Hot 100, it reached the top ten in several other countries. Second single, "Best Thing I Never Had", reached the top ten in several charts worldwide and peaked at number 16 on the US Hot 100. Third single "Lift Off", did not chart on the US Hot 100; however, fourth single "Love on Top" peaked at number 20 on the Billboard Hot 100 and topped the US Hot R&B/Hip-Hop Songs chart for seven weeks.

Her fifth album, Beyoncé, was released in December 2013. The album's highest-charting single was "Drunk in Love", which reached number two on the US Billboard Hot 100. Beyoncé's sixth studio album Lemonade was released on April 23, 2016. All twelve tracks from Lemonade charted within the Hot 100 in the US, breaking a record previously held by Taylor Swift for most songs by a female artist charting concurrently. The album's lead single, "Formation", was the highest-charting song from the album, peaking at number ten on the Billboard Hot 100. Beyoncé's seventh studio album, Renaissance, was released in July 2022. The album's lead single, "Break My Soul", peaked at number one in the United States and various other countries worldwide. The album's second single, "Cuff It", peaked in the top ten on the Billboard Hot 100 and internationally.

Beyoncé's country and gospel-tinged eighth studio album, Cowboy Carter, was released in March 2024. The co-lead singles were "Texas Hold 'Em" and "16 Carriages". "Texas Hold 'Em" became her highest chart debut in her career, her seventh solo number-one and her ninth across all credits on the Billboard Hot 100. The third single, "II Most Wanted", a duet with Miley Cyrus, peaked at number six on the Billboard Hot 100.

== As lead artist ==
=== 2000s ===
List of singles as lead artist
Title	Year	Peak chart positions										Certifications	Album
Title	Year	US	AUS	CAN	FRA	GER	IRE	NLD	NZ	SWI	UK	Certifications	Album
"Work It Out"	2002	—	21	—	87	75	12	26	36	48	7	ARIA: Gold	Austin Powers in Goldmember
"Crazy in Love" (featuring Jay-Z)	2003	1	2	2	21	6	1	2	2	3	1	RIAA: 8× Platinum; ARIA: 11× Platinum; BPI: 5× Platinum; BVMI: 3× Gold; MC: 5× Platinum; RMNZ: 6× Platinum	Dangerously in Love
"Baby Boy" (featuring Sean Paul)	2003	1	3	2	8	4	6	11	2	5	2	RIAA: 2× Platinum; ARIA: 3× Platinum; BPI: Platinum; BVMI: Gold; MC: Platinum; RMNZ: 2× Platinum	Dangerously in Love
"Fighting Temptation" (with Missy Elliott, MC Lyte and Free)	2003	—	—	34	—	54	—	11	—	—	—		The Fighting Temptations
"Me, Myself and I"	2003	4	11	7	—	35	21	14	18	41	11	RIAA: 2× Platinum; ARIA: Platinum; BPI: Silver; MC: Gold; RMNZ: Platinum	Dangerously in Love
"Summertime" (featuring P. Diddy)	2003	— (Note: "Summertime" did not enter the Billboard Hot 100, but peaked at number eight on the Bubbling Under Hot 100 Singles chart.)	—	—	—	—	—	—	—	—	—	RMNZ: Platinum	The Fighting Temptations
"Naughty Girl"	2004	3	9	2	18	16	14	14	6	18	10	RIAA: 2× Platinum; ARIA: 3× Platinum; BPI: Platinum; MC: Platinum; RMNZ: Platinum	Dangerously in Love
"The Closer I Get to You" (with Luther Vandross)	2004	—	—	—	—	—	—	—	—	—	—	RIAA: Gold	Dangerously in Love and Dance with My Father
"Wishing on a Star"	2005	—	—	—	—	—	—	—	—	—	—		Roll Bounce
"Check on It" (featuring Bun B and Slim Thug)	2005	1	— (Note: "Check on It" did not enter the ARIA Singles Chart, but peaked at number 15 on the ARIA Digital Tracks chart.)	5	32	11	5	3	1	7	3	RIAA: 2× Platinum; BPI: Silver; MC: Platinum; RMNZ: Platinum	#1's
"Déjà Vu" (featuring Jay-Z)	2006	4	12	14	23	9	3	13	15	3	1	RIAA: Platinum; ARIA: Platinum; BPI: Platinum; MC: Gold; RMNZ: Gold	B'Day
"Ring the Alarm"	2006	11	—	—	—	—	—	—	—	—	—	RIAA: Platinum	B'Day
"Irreplaceable"	2006	1	1	2	10	11	1	5	1	9	4	RIAA: 8× Platinum; ARIA: 7× Platinum; BPI: 3× Platinum; BVMI: Gold; MC: 3× Platinum; RMNZ: 4× Platinum	B'Day
"Listen"	2007	61	—	—	—	18	6	18	—	—	8	RIAA: Platinum; ARIA: Platinum; BPI: Platinum; MC: Gold; RMNZ: Gold	Dreamgirls
"Beautiful Liar" (with Shakira)	2007	3	5	2	1	1	1	1	1	1	1	RIAA: 3× Platinum; ARIA: 2× Platinum; BPI: Platinum; BVMI: Gold; MC: Platinum; RMNZ: Platinum	B'Day: Deluxe Edition
"Get Me Bodied"	2007	46	—	—	—	—	—	—	—	—	—	RIAA: Platinum; ARIA: Gold	B'Day
"Green Light"	2007	—	—	—	—	—	46	20	—	—	12	BPI: Silver	B'Day
"Until the End of Time" (with Justin Timberlake)	2007	17	—	—	—	—	—	—	31	—	—	RIAA: Gold; RMNZ: Gold	FutureSex/LoveSounds
"If I Were a Boy"	2008	3	3	4	5	3	2	1	2	3	1	RIAA: 6× Platinum; ARIA: 7× Platinum; BPI: 3× Platinum; BVMI: Gold; IFPI SWI: Platinum; MC: 5× Platinum; RMNZ: 4× Platinum	I Am... Sasha Fierce
"Single Ladies (Put a Ring on It)"	2008	1	5	2	68	3	4	12	2	40	7	RIAA: 11× Platinum; ARIA: 10× Platinum; BPI: 3× Platinum; BVMI: 3× Gold; MC: 6× Platinum; RMNZ: 4× Platinum	I Am... Sasha Fierce
"At Last"	2008	67	—	79	—	—	—	—	—	—	—		Cadillac Records
"Diva"	2009	19	40	—	—	—	50	73	26	—	72	RIAA: 2× Platinum; ARIA: Platinum; BPI: Gold; MC: Platinum; RMNZ: Platinum	I Am... Sasha Fierce
"Halo"	2009	5	3	3	9	5	4	14	2	4	4	RIAA: 11× Platinum; ARIA: 13× Platinum; BPI: 5× Platinum; BVMI: 3× Gold; IFPI SWI: Platinum; MC: 9× Platinum; RMNZ: 7× Platinum	I Am... Sasha Fierce
"Ego"	2009	39	—	—	—	—	—	42	11	—	60	RIAA: 2× Platinum; ARIA: Gold; BPI: Silver; MC: Gold; RMNZ: Platinum	I Am... Sasha Fierce
"Sweet Dreams"	2009	10	2	17	—	8	4	46	1	16	5	RIAA: 3× Platinum; ARIA: 4× Platinum; BPI: 2× Platinum; BVMI: Gold; MC: Platinum; RMNZ: 3× Platinum	I Am... Sasha Fierce
"Broken-Hearted Girl"	2009	—	14	—	—	14	20	—	—	62	27	RIAA: Gold; ARIA: Platinum; BPI: Gold; RMNZ: Gold	I Am... Sasha Fierce
"Video Phone" (solo or featuring Lady Gaga)	2009	65	31	—	—	—	—	—	32	—	58	RIAA: Platinum; ARIA: Gold	I Am... Sasha Fierce
"—" denotes items which were not released in that country or failed to chart.

=== 2010s ===
List of singles as lead artist
Title	Year	Peak chart positions										Certifications	Album
Title	Year	US	AUS	CAN	FRA	GER	IRE	NLD	NZ	SWI	UK	Certifications	Album
"Why Don't You Love Me"	2010	—	73	—	—	—	—	—	—	—	51		I Am... Sasha Fierce
"Run the World (Girls)"	2011	29	10	16	12	—	11	8	9	22	11	RIAA: 5× Platinum; ARIA: 5× Platinum; BPI: 2× Platinum; BVMI: Gold; MC: 3× Platinum; RMNZ: 2× Platinum	4
"Best Thing I Never Had"	2011	16	17	27	61	29	2	37	5	35	3	RIAA: 4× Platinum; ARIA: 4× Platinum; BPI: 2× Platinum; BVMI: Gold; MC: 2× Platinum; RMNZ: 2× Platinum	4
"Party" (featuring André 3000)	2011	50	—	—	—	—	—	—	—	—	—	RIAA: 2× Platinum; ARIA: Gold; MC: Gold; RMNZ: Platinum	4
"Love on Top"	2011	20	20	65	83	—	21	61	14	—	13	RIAA: 5× Platinum; ARIA: 6× Platinum; BPI: 2× Platinum; MC: 2× Platinum; RMNZ: 4× Platinum	4
"Countdown"	2011	71	—	62	—	—	45	92	—	—	35	RIAA: 3× Platinum; ARIA: Platinum; BPI: Gold; MC: Platinum; RMNZ: Gold	4
"I Care"	2012	—	—	—	—	—	—	—	—	—	—	RIAA: Gold	4
"End of Time"	2012	— (Note: "End of Time" did not enter the Billboard Hot 100, but peaked at number 13 on the Bubbling Under Hot 100 Singles chart.)	—	—	—	—	27	—	—	—	39	RIAA: Platinum; ARIA: Gold; BPI: Gold; RMNZ: Gold	4
"XO"	2013	45	16	36	99	68	15	37	10	—	22	RIAA: 2× Platinum; ARIA: 2× Platinum; BPI: Platinum; MC: Platinum; RMNZ: Platinum	Beyoncé
"Drunk in Love" (featuring Jay-Z)	2013	2	22	23	9	70	10	39	7	40	9	RIAA: 8× Platinum; ARIA: 3× Platinum; BPI: 2× Platinum; BVMI: Gold; MC: 4× Platinum; RMNZ: 3× Platinum	Beyoncé
"Partition"	2014	23	—	100	120	—	57	—	—	—	74	RIAA: 5× Platinum; ARIA: 3× Platinum; BPI: Platinum; MC: 2× Platinum; RMNZ: 2× Platinum	Beyoncé
"Pretty Hurts"	2014	— (Note: "Pretty Hurts" did not enter the Billboard Hot 100, but peaked at number 13 on the Bubbling Under Hot 100 Singles chart.)	47	78	133	83	56	87	—	67	63	RIAA: 2× Platinum; ARIA: Platinum; BPI: Gold; MC: Platinum; RMNZ: Platinum	Beyoncé
"Flawless" (featuring Chimamanda Ngozi Adichie or Nicki Minaj)	2014	41	—	88	83	—	77	—	—	—	65	RIAA: 3× Platinum; ARIA: Gold; BPI: Silver; MC: Platinum; RMNZ: Platinum	Beyoncé
"7/11"	2014	13	41	43	11	78	54	43	24	74	33	RIAA: 4× Platinum; ARIA: 3× Platinum; BPI: Platinum; BVMI: Gold; MC: 2× Platinum; RMNZ: 2× Platinum	Beyoncé: Platinum Edition
"Ring Off"	2014	— (Note: "Ring Off" did not enter the Billboard Hot 100, but peaked at number five on the Bubbling Under Hot 100 Singles chart.)	—	—	110	—	—	84	—	—	81		Beyoncé: Platinum Edition
"Formation"	2016	10	17	32	24	74	59	—	—	—	31	RIAA: 3× Platinum; ARIA: 2× Platinum; BPI: Gold; MC: Platinum; RMNZ: Platinum	Lemonade
"Sorry"	2016	11	74	40	62	—	82	—	—	—	33	RIAA: 4× Platinum; ARIA: Platinum; BPI: Gold; MC: Platinum; RMNZ: Gold	Lemonade
"Hold Up"	2016	13	25	37	14	—	52	—	— (Note: "Hold Up" did not enter the NZ Top 40 Singles Chart, but peaked at number 1 on the NZ Heatseeker Singles Chart.)	—	11	RIAA: 3× Platinum; ARIA: 2× Platinum; BPI: Platinum; MC: Platinum; RMNZ: Platinum	Lemonade
"Freedom" (featuring Kendrick Lamar)	2016	35	62	60	53	—	95	—	—	—	40	RIAA: Platinum; ARIA: Gold; BPI: Silver	Lemonade
"All Night"	2016	38	—	73	71	—	—	—	—	—	60	RIAA: 2× Platinum; ARIA: Gold; BPI: Gold; MC: Gold; RMNZ: Platinum; SNEP: Gold	Lemonade
"Perfect Duet" (with Ed Sheeran)	2017	1	—	1	—	—	—	1	1	—	—	RMNZ: 2× Platinum	Non-album single
"Spirit"	2019	98	99	92	—	—	65	67	— (Note: "Spirit" did not enter the NZ Top 40 Singles Chart, but peaked at number 12 on the NZ Hot Singles Chart.)	—	59		The Lion King: Original Motion Picture Soundtrack and The Lion King: The Gift
"Brown Skin Girl" (with Saint Jhn and Wizkid featuring Blue Ivy Carter)	2019	76	—	60	—	—	50	82	— (Note: "Brown Skin Girl" did not enter the NZ Top 40 Singles Chart, but peaked at number six on the NZ Hot Singles Chart.)	—	42	RIAA: Gold; ARIA: Gold; BPI: Silver; MC: Gold; RMNZ: Gold	The Lion King: The Gift
"—" denotes items which were not released in that country or failed to chart.

=== 2020s ===
List of singles as lead artist
Title	Year	Peak chart positions										Certifications	Album
Title	Year	US	AUS	CAN	FRA	IRE	NLD	NZ	SWI	UK	WW	Certifications	Album
"Black Parade" (Note: "Black Parade" was also released as a charity single to raise funds for the BeyGOOD Black Business Impact Fund, administered by the National Urban League.)	2020	37	76	70	—	45	—	— (Note: "Black Parade" did not enter the NZ Top 40 Singles Chart, but peaked at number three on the NZ Hot Singles Chart.)	—	49	—	RIAA: Gold	The Lion King: The Gift
"Be Alive"	2021	—	—	—	—	—	—	— (Note: "Be Alive" did not enter the NZ Top 40 Singles Chart, but peaked at number 36 on the NZ Hot Singles Chart.)	—	—	—		King Richard (Original Motion Picture Soundtrack)
"Break My Soul"	2022	1	6	4	18	1	14	16	15	2	6	RIAA: 2× Platinum; ARIA: 2× Platinum; BPI: Platinum; IFPI SWI: Platinum; MC: Platinum; RMNZ: Platinum; SNEP: Platinum	Renaissance
"Cuff It"	2022	6	8	16	14	6	22	3	18	5	12	RIAA: 3× Platinum; ARIA: 2× Platinum; BPI: 2× Platinum; IFPI SWI: Platinum; MC: 3× Platinum; RMNZ: 3× Platinum; SNEP: Diamond	Renaissance
"America Has a Problem" (solo or featuring Kendrick Lamar)	2023	38	32	41	—	15	99	25	96	22	40	RIAA: Platinum; ARIA: Gold; BPI: Silver; MC: Platinum; RMNZ: Gold	Renaissance
"Virgo's Groove"	2023	43	78	65	176	—	—	—	—	— (Note: "Virgo's Groove" did not enter the UK Singles Chart but peaked at number 61 on the Official Audio Streaming Chart.)	46	RIAA: Gold	Renaissance
"Delresto (Echoes)" (with Travis Scott)	2023	25	34	26	38	—	—	30	—	—	19	MC: Gold	Utopia
"My House"	2023	57	—	64	—	53	— (Note: "My House" did not enter the Dutch Single Top 100, but peaked at number four on the Single Tip chart.)	— (Note: "My House" did not enter the NZ Top 40 Singles Chart, but peaked at number three on the NZ Hot Singles Chart.)	—	56	63		Non-album single
"Texas Hold 'Em"	2024	1	2	1	4	1	1	1	2	1	1	RIAA: 2× Platinum; ARIA: Platinum; BPI: 2× Platinum; IFPI SWI: Platinum; MC: 4× Platinum; RMNZ: 2× Platinum; SNEP: Diamond	Cowboy Carter
"16 Carriages"	2024	38	85	56	128	57	—	— (Note: "16 Carriages" did not enter the NZ Top 40 Singles Chart, but peaked at number nine on the NZ Hot Singles Chart.)	—	44	40	RIAA: Gold	Cowboy Carter
"II Most Wanted" (with Miley Cyrus)	2024	6	16	17	63	13	27	17	20	9	10	RIAA: Gold; BPI: Silver; MC: Gold	Cowboy Carter
"Morning Dew (Donk)"	2026	26	86	82	—	—	— (Note: "Morning Dew (Donk)" did not enter the Dutch Single Top 100, but peaked at number 19 on the Dutch Single Tip chart.)	— (Note: "Morning Dew (Donk)" did not enter the NZ Top 40 Singles Chart, but peaked at number 2 on the NZ Hot Singles Chart.)	—	60	57		B'Day (20th anniversary edition)
"—" denotes items which were not released in that country or failed to chart.

== As featured artist ==
List of singles as featured artist
Title	Year	Peak chart positions										Certifications	Album
Title	Year	US	AUS	CAN	FRA	GER	IRE	NLD	NZ	SWI	UK	Certifications	Album
"I Got That" (Amil featuring Beyoncé)	2000	—	—	—	—	—	—	—	—	—	—		All Money Is Legal
"'03 Bonnie & Clyde" (Jay-Z featuring Beyoncé)	2002	4	2	6	25	6	8	5	4	1	2	RIAA: Platinum; ARIA: Platinum; BPI: Platinum; RMNZ: Platinum	The Blueprint 2: The Gift & The Curse
"Hollywood" (Jay-Z featuring Beyoncé)	2007	—	98	—	—	—	—	—	—	—	—		Kingdom Come
"Love in This Club Part II" (Usher featuring Beyoncé and Lil Wayne)	2008	18	96	69	—	—	—	—	—	—	—	RIAA: Platinum; RMNZ: Platinum	Here I Stand
"Put It in a Love Song" (Alicia Keys featuring Beyoncé)	2010	— (Note: "Put It in a Love Song" did not enter the Billboard Hot 100, but peaked at number two on the Bubbling Under Hot 100 Singles chart.)	18	71	—	—	26	—	24	—	—	ARIA: Platinum	The Element of Freedom
"Telephone" (Lady Gaga featuring Beyoncé)	2010	3	3	3	3	3	1	6	3	3	1	RIAA: 5× Platinum; ARIA: 8× Platinum; BPI: 3× Platinum; BVMI: Gold; IFPI SWI: Gold; MC: 3× Platinum; RMNZ: 3× Platinum; SNEP: Gold	The Fame Monster
"Lift Off" (Jay-Z and Kanye West featuring Beyoncé)	2011	— (Note: "Lift Off" did not enter the Billboard Hot 100, but peaked at number 21 on the Bubbling Under Hot 100 Singles chart.)	81	—	—	—	—	—	—	—	48		Watch the Throne
"Part II (On the Run)" (Jay-Z featuring Beyoncé)	2014	77	—	—	187	—	—	—	—	—	93	RIAA: Platinum	Magna Carta Holy Grail
"Say Yes" (Michelle Williams featuring Beyoncé and Kelly Rowland)	2014	— (Note: "Say Yes" did not enter the Billboard Hot 100, but peaked at number nine on the Bubbling Under Hot 100 Singles chart.)	—	—	90	—	—	—	—	—	106		Journey to Freedom
"Runnin' (Lose It All)" (Naughty Boy featuring Beyoncé and Arrow Benjamin)	2015	90	22	61	18	85	12	14	10	24	4	ARIA: Gold; BPI: 2× Platinum; RMNZ: 2× Platinum	Non-album single
"Shining" (DJ Khaled featuring Beyoncé and Jay-Z)	2017	57	93	72	75	—	—	—	—	—	71	RIAA: Platinum; ARIA: Gold; BPI: Silver; MC: Gold; RMNZ: Gold	Grateful
"Mi Gente" (remix) (J Balvin and Willy William featuring Beyoncé)	2017	3	11	2	—	—	—	1	39	16	—	RIAA: 68× Platinum (Latin); ARIA: 3× Platinum; RMNZ: Gold; SNEP: Gold	Non-album single
"Walk on Water" (Eminem featuring Beyoncé)	2017	14	10	22	13	16	8	14	18	5	7	RIAA: Gold; ARIA: Platinum; BPI: Silver; MC: Platinum; RMNZ: Gold	Revival
"Top Off" (DJ Khaled featuring Jay-Z, Future and Beyoncé)	2018	22	—	48	55	98	67	—	— (Note: "Top Off" did not enter the NZ Top 40 Singles Chart, but peaked at number five on the NZ Heatseeker Singles Chart.)	66	41	RIAA: Platinum; MC: Gold	Father of Asahd
"Savage Remix" (Megan Thee Stallion featuring Beyoncé)	2020	1	—	9	—	—	—	28	2	—	—	MC: 5× Platinum; RMNZ: Platinum; SNEP: Gold	Good News
"Make Me Say It Again, Girl" (Ronald Isley and the Isley Brothers featuring Beyoncé)	2022	— (Note: "Make Me Say It Again, Girl" did not enter the Billboard Hot 100, but peaked at number 50 on the Digital Song Sales chart.)	—	—	—	—	—	—	—	—	—		Make Me Say It Again, Girl
"—" denotes items which were not released in that country or failed to chart.

== Promotional singles ==
List of promotional singles
Title	Year	Peak chart positions							Certifications	Album
Title	Year	US	US R&B /HH	AUS	CAN	FRA	IRE	UK	Certifications	Album
"I Can't Take No More"	2003	—	—	—	—	—	—	—		Dangerously in Love
"Daddy"	2003	—	—	—	—	—	—	—		Dangerously in Love
"What's It Gonna Be"	2003	—	—	—	—	—	—	—		Dangerously in Love
"One Night Only" (with Deena Jones and the Dreams)	2006	—	—	—	—	—	—	67		Dreamgirls
"Upgrade U" (featuring Jay-Z)	2006	59	11	—	—	—	—	—	RIAA: 2× Platinum; ARIA: Platinum; BPI: Silver; MC: Gold; RMNZ: Gold	B'Day
"Si Yo Fuera un Chico"	2009	—	—	—	—	—	—	—		I Am... Sasha Fierce
"Sing a Song"	2009	—	—	—	—	—	—	—		Wow! Wow! Wubbzy!: Sing-a-Song
"Fever"	2010	—	—	—	—	—	—	—		Heat
"1+1"	2011	57	— (Note: "1+1" did not enter the Hot R&B/Hip-Hop Songs chart, but peaked at number five on the Bubbling Under R&B/Hip-Hop Singles chart.)	—	82	—	—	71	RIAA: Platinum; ARIA: Gold; BPI: Silver; RMNZ: Gold	4
"Daddy Lessons" (featuring the Dixie Chicks)	2016	41	26	—	62	90	—	40	RIAA: Platinum; ARIA: Gold; BPI: Silver; MC: Platinum; RMNZ: Gold	Lemonade
"Die with You"	2017	— (Note: "Die with You" did not enter the Billboard Hot 100, but peaked at number 21 on the Bubbling Under Hot 100 Singles chart.)	—	—	—	51	—	62		Non-album single
"Mood 4 Eva" (with Jay-Z and Childish Gambino featuring Oumou Sangaré)	2019	90	33	48	64	—	54	56		The Lion King: The Gift
"Grown Woman"	2023	—	—	—	—	—	—	— (Note: "Grown Woman" did not enter the UK Singles Chart but debuted and peaked at number 67 on the UK Singles Downloads Chart.)	RIAA: Gold	Non-album single
"—" denotes items which were not released in that country or failed to chart.

== Charity singles ==
List of charity singles, with selected chart positions, showing year released
Title	Year	Peak chart positions							Notes
Title	Year	US	US R&B /HH	AUS	CAN	IRE	NZ	UK	Notes
"What More Can I Give" (with The All Stars)	2003	—	—	—	—	—	—	—	To commemorate the victims of September 11 attacks.
"The Star Spangled Banner (Super Bowl XXXVIII Performance)"	2004	—	—	—	—	—	—	—	Recorded live at Super Bowl XXXVIII in 2004.
"Just Stand Up!" (with Artists Stand Up to Cancer)	2008	11	57	39	10	11	19	26	Part of the Stand Up to Cancer campaign.
"Halo (Live)"	2010	— (Note: "Halo" (live) did not enter the Billboard Hot 100, but peaked at number five on the Bubbling Under Hot 100 Singles chart.)	—	—	58	—	—	—	Accompanied by Chris Martin on piano, the song was performed live for the Hope for Haiti Now charity telethon and appears on the 2010 Hope For Haiti Now album.
"God Bless the USA"	2011	—	—	—	—	—	—	—	To raise funds for the New York Police and Fire Widows' and Children's Benefit Fund.
"Irreplaceable" (Live at Glastonbury)	2011	—	—	—	—	—	—	33	To raise funds for Oxfam, WaterAid and Greenpeace.
"Say Her Name (Hell You Talmbout)" (with Janelle Monáe and various artists and activists)	2021	—	—	—	—	—	—	—	To highlight the deaths of black women at the hands of police in the US. All proceeds go to the African American Policy Forum.
"—" denotes items which were not released in that country or failed to chart.

== Other charted and certified songs ==
List of other charted songs
Title	Year	Peak chart positions										Certifications	Album
Title	Year	US	US R&B /HH	AUS	CAN	FRA	IRE	NLD	SWI	UK	WW	Certifications	Album
"Dangerously in Love 2"	2003	57	17	—	—	—	—	—	—	—	—	RIAA: Platinum; BPI: Silver	Dangerously in Love
"Sexy Lil Thug"	2003	—	67	—	—	—	—	—	—	—	—		Non-album track
"A Woman Like Me"	2006	—	— (Note: "A Woman Like Me" did not enter the Hot R&B/Hip-Hop Songs chart, but peaked at number three on the Bubbling Under R&B/Hip-Hop Singles chart.)	—	—	—	—	—	—	—	—		The Pink Panther
"Kitty Kat"	2006	—	66	—	—	—	—	—	—	—	—		B'Day
"Freakum Dress"	2006	—	— (Note: "Freakum Dress" did not enter the Hot R&B/Hip-Hop Songs chart, but peaked at number 16 on the Bubbling Under R&B/Hip-Hop Singles chart.)	—	—	—	—	—	—	—	—	RIAA: Gold	B'Day
"Resentment"	2006	—	—	—	—	—	—	—	—	—	—	RIAA: Gold	B'Day
"Lost Yo Mind"	2006	—	— (Note: "Lost Yo Mind" did not enter the Hot R&B/Hip-Hop Songs chart, but peaked at number 17 on the Bubbling Under R&B/Hip-Hop Singles chart. In 2026, after the release of B'Day (20th anniversary edition), "Lost Yo Mind" debuted at number 21 on the Hot R&B Songs chart.)	—	—	—	—	—	—	—	—		B'Day
"Ave Maria"	2008	—	—	90	—	160	—	—	—	150	—	RIAA: Gold; ARIA: Gold; RMNZ: Gold	I Am... Sasha Fierce
"Radio"	2008	—	—	—	—	—	—	14	—	—	—		I Am... Sasha Fierce
"I'd Rather Go Blind"	2008	—	—	—	—	—	—	—	—	—	—	RIAA: Gold; RMNZ: Gold	Cadillac Records
"See Me Now" (Kanye West featuring Beyoncé, Charlie Wilson and Big Sean)	2010	—	— (Note: "See Me Now" did not enter the Hot R&B/Hip-Hop Songs chart, but peaked at number two on the Bubbling Under R&B/Hip-Hop Singles chart.)	—	—	—	—	—	—	—	—		My Beautiful Dark Twisted Fantasy
"Love a Woman" (Mary J. Blige featuring Beyoncé)	2011	—	89	—	—	—	—	—	—	—	—		My Life II... The Journey Continues (Act 1)
"I Miss You"	2011	—	—	—	—	—	—	—	—	184	—	RIAA: Gold	4
"I Was Here"	2011	—	—	85	—	—	88	—	74	131	—	RIAA: Gold; ARIA: Platinum; BPI: Silver	4
"Dance for You"	2011	78	7	—	—	—	—	—	—	147	—	RIAA: 3× Platinum; ARIA: Gold; BPI: Silver; RMNZ: Platinum	4
"Schoolin' Life"	2011	—	—	—	—	—	—	—	—	—	—	RIAA: Gold	4
"Haunted"	2013	—	— (Note: "Haunted" did not enter the Hot R&B/Hip-Hop Songs chart, but peaked at number 13 on the Bubbling Under R&B/Hip-Hop Singles chart.)	—	—	99	—	—	—	158	—	RIAA: Platinum; BPI: Silver; RMNZ: Gold	Beyoncé
"Blow"	2013	—	48	—	—	—	—	63	—	—	—	RIAA: Platinum	Beyoncé
"No Angel"	2013	—	—	—	—	—	—	—	—	—	—	RIAA: Gold	Beyoncé
"Yoncé"	2013	—	—	—	—	—	—	—	—	—	—	ARIA: Gold	Beyoncé
"Jealous"	2013	—	—	—	—	—	—	—	—	—	—	RIAA: Gold	Beyoncé
"Rocket"	2013	—	—	—	—	—	—	—	—	—	—	RIAA: Platinum; RMNZ: Gold	Beyoncé
"Mine" (featuring Drake)	2013	82	25	—	82	159	—	—	—	65	—	RIAA: Platinum; MC: Gold	Beyoncé
"Superpower"	2013	—	—	—	—	—	—	—	—	—	—	RIAA: Gold	Beyoncé
"Heaven"	2013	—	—	—	—	—	—	—	—	—	—	RIAA: Gold	Beyoncé
"Blue"	2013	—	—	—	—	—	—	—	—	—	—	RIAA: Gold	Beyoncé
"Standing on the Sun" (Remix) (featuring Mr. Vegas)	2014	—	45	—	—	—	—	—	—	170	—		Beyoncé: Platinum Edition
"Feeling Myself" (Nicki Minaj featuring Beyoncé)	2014	39	11	52	67	53	—	—	—	64	—	RIAA: 2× Platinum; ARIA: 2× Platinum; BPI: Gold; RMNZ: Platinum	The Pinkprint
"Pray You Catch Me"	2016	37	22	97	71	96	—	—	—	52	—	RIAA: Platinum	Lemonade
"Don't Hurt Yourself" (featuring Jack White)	2016	28	16	93	53	47	—	—	—	36	—	RIAA: Platinum; BPI: Silver	Lemonade
"6 Inch" (featuring The Weeknd)	2016	18	10	61	31	47	—	—	—	35	—	RIAA: Platinum; ARIA: Gold; BPI: Silver; MC: Gold	Lemonade
"Love Drought"	2016	47	28	—	84	152	—	—	—	69	—	RIAA: Platinum	Lemonade
"Sandcastles"	2016	43	27	—	79	109	—	—	—	57	—	RIAA: Gold	Lemonade
"Forward" (featuring James Blake)	2016	63	30	—	—	151	—	—	—	85	—		Lemonade
"Family Feud" (Jay-Z featuring Beyoncé)	2017	51	—	—	—	—	—	—	—	—	—	RIAA: Gold	4:44
"Before I Let Go"	2019	65	24	—	—	—	71	—	—	77	—	RIAA: Platinum; RMNZ: Gold	Homecoming: The Live Album
"Can You Feel the Love Tonight" (with Donald Glover, Billy Eichner and Seth Rogen)	2019	— (Note: "Can You Feel the Love Tonight" did not enter the Billboard Hot 100 but peaked at number 43 on the Digital Song Sales component chart.)	—	93	—	—	75	—	—	87	—		The Lion King
"Bigger"	2019	—	— (Note: "Bigger" did not enter the Hot R&B/Hip-Hop Songs chart, but peaked at number nine on the Bubbling Under R&B/Hip-Hop Singles chart.)	—	—	—	—	—	—	—	—		The Lion King: The Gift
"Find Your Way Back"	2019	—	— (Note: "Find Your Way Back" did not enter the Hot R&B/Hip-Hop Songs chart, but peaked at number twenty-five on the Hot R&B Songs chart.)	—	—	—	—	—	—	—	—		The Lion King: The Gift
"Already" (with Shatta Wale and Major Lazer)	2019	—	— (Note: "Already" did not enter the Hot R&B/Hip-Hop Songs chart, but peaked at number 22 on the Hot R&B Songs chart.)	—	—	—	—	—	—	95	—	RIAA: Gold; BPI: Silver; MC: Gold; SNEP: Gold	The Lion King: The Gift
"I'm That Girl"	2022	26	11	38	45	90	—	55	— (Note: "I'm That Girl" did not enter the Swiss Singles chart, but charted at number 80 on the Swiss Hitparade Streaming chart.)	— (Note: "I'm That Girl" did not enter the UK Singles Chart but peaked at number 32 on the Official Audio Streaming Chart.)	20	RIAA: Gold	Renaissance
"Cozy"	2022	30	13	46	52	110	—	—	— (Note: "Cozy" did not enter the Swiss Singles chart, but charted at number 96 on the Swiss Hitparade Streaming chart.)	— (Note: "Cozy" did not enter the UK Singles Chart but peaked at number 37 on the Official Audio Streaming Chart.)	27	RIAA: Gold; BPI: Silver; MC: Gold	Renaissance
"Alien Superstar"	2022	19	8	31	33	73	17	—	46	16	15	RIAA: Platinum; ARIA: Gold; BPI: Silver; MC: Gold; RMNZ: Gold; SNEP: Gold	Renaissance
"Energy" (featuring Beam)	2022	27	12	42	46	97	—	—	— (Note: "Energy" did not enter the Swiss Singles chart, but charted at number 80 on the Swiss Hitparade Streaming chart.)	— (Note: "Energy" did not enter the UK Singles Chart but peaked at number 34 on the Official Audio Streaming Chart.)	23	RIAA: Gold; BPI: Silver; MC: Gold	Renaissance
"Church Girl"	2022	22	10	50	51	125	—	—	—	— (Note: "Church Girl" did not enter the UK Singles Chart but peaked at number 30 on the Official Audio Streaming Chart.)	19	RIAA: Gold	Renaissance
"Plastic Off the Sofa"	2022	41	16	89	70	198	—	—	—	— (Note: "Plastic Off the Sofa" did not enter the UK Singles Chart but peaked at number 74 on the Official Audio Streaming Chart.)	47	RIAA: Gold	Renaissance
"Move" (featuring Grace Jones and Tems)	2022	55	22	—	72	—	—	—	—	— (Note: "Move" did not enter the UK Singles Chart but peaked at number 76 on the Official Audio Streaming Chart.)	53	RIAA: Gold	Renaissance
"Heated"	2022	51	20	—	69	—	91	—	—	68	52	RIAA: Gold; BPI: Silver; MC: Gold	Renaissance
"Thique"	2022	53	21	—	75	—	—	—	—	— (Note: "Thique" did not enter the UK Singles Chart but peaked at number 97 on the Official Audio Streaming Chart.)	55	RIAA: Gold	Renaissance
"All Up in Your Mind"	2022	70	28	—	94	—	—	—	—	—	82		Renaissance
"Pure/Honey"	2022	64	26	96	77	—	—	—	—	— (Note: "Pure/Honey" did not enter the UK Singles Chart but peaked at number 90 on the Official Audio Streaming Chart.)	62	RIAA: Gold	Renaissance
"Summer Renaissance"	2022	47	18	33	40	180	—	—	—	— (Note: "Summer Renaissance" did not enter the UK Singles Chart but peaked at number 28 on the UK Singles Downloads Chart.)	38	RIAA: Gold; MC: Gold	Renaissance
"Ameriican Requiem"	2024	30	—	61	51	86	—	—	—	—	28		Cowboy Carter
"Blackbiird" (with Brittney Spencer, Reyna Roberts, Tanner Adell and Tiera Kennedy)	2024	27	—	60	47	114	—	—	—	—	23		Cowboy Carter
"Protector" (with Rumi Carter)	2024	42	—	—	65	158	—	—	—	—	53		Cowboy Carter
"My Rose"	2024	54	—	—	74	197	—	—	—	—	77		Cowboy Carter
"Bodyguard"	2024	26	—	51	40	81	—	—	—	—	19		Cowboy Carter
"Jolene"	2024	7	—	24	19	70	11	26	21	8	11	MC: Gold	Cowboy Carter
"Daughter"	2024	37	—	86	54	97	—	—	—	—	34		Cowboy Carter
"Spaghettii" (with Linda Martell and Shaboozey)	2024	31	12	—	58	122	—	—	—	—	37		Cowboy Carter
"Alliigator Tears"	2024	52	—	—	72	—	—	—	—	—	75		Cowboy Carter
"Just for Fun" (with Willie Jones)	2024	59	—	—	79	—	—	—	—	—	85		Cowboy Carter
"Levii's Jeans" (with Post Malone)	2024	16	—	73	41	169	—	—	—	—	20		Cowboy Carter
"Flamenco"	2024	63	—	—	88	—	—	—	—	—	102		Cowboy Carter
"Ya Ya"	2024	39	—	—	59	141	—	—	—	—	43		Cowboy Carter
"Oh Louisiana"	2024	70	—	—	—	—	—	—	—	—	128		Cowboy Carter
"Desert Eagle"	2024	65	24	—	—	—	—	—	—	—	118		Cowboy Carter
"Riiverdance"	2024	51	—	—	83	—	—	—	—	—	80		Cowboy Carter
"II Hands II Heaven"	2024	60	21	—	98	—	—	—	—	—	97		Cowboy Carter
"Tyrant" (with Dolly Parton)	2024	44	18	—	71	—	77	—	—	83	64		Cowboy Carter
"Sweet / Honey / Buckiin'" (with Shaboozey)	2024	61	22	—	94	—	—	—	—	—	109		Cowboy Carter
"Amen"	2024	87	—	—	—	—	—	—	—	—	—		Cowboy Carter
"Can I Watch You" (with Pharrell Williams)	2026	— (Note: "Can I Watch You" did not enter the Billboard Hot 100 Chart, but peaked at number 13 on the US Hot R&B Songs Chart.)	—	—	—	—	—	—	—	—	—		B'Day (20th anniversary edition)
"Cuerpo (Tumbao)" (featuring Maluma)	2026	— (Note: "Cuerpo (Tumbao)" did not enter the Billboard Hot 100, but peaked at number 3 on the Billboard Hot Tropical Songs chart and number 44 on the Billboard Hot Latin Songs chart.)	—	—	—	—	—	—	—	—	—		B'Day (20th anniversary edition)
"—" denotes items which were not released in that country or failed to chart.

== Guest appearances ==
List of non-single guest appearances, with other performing artists, showing year released and album name
Title	Year	Other artist(s)	Album	Ref.
"After All Is Said and Done"	1999	Marc Nelson	The Best Man	
"Crazy Feelings"	1999	Missy Elliott	Da Real World	
"Ways to Get Cut Off"	1999	JoJo Robinson	Hush (Shelved)	
"Have Your Way"	2000	Kelly Rowland	His Woman His Wife	
"Hey Goldmember"	2002	Devin, Solange	Austin Powers in Goldmember	
"Nothing out There for Me"	2002	Missy Elliott	Under Construction	
"We Will Rock You"	2002	Britney Spears, P!nk	Pepsi Music 2004 CD	
"Keep Giving Your Love to Me"	2003	—N/a	Bad Boys II (soundtrack)	
"Fever"	2003	—N/a	The Fighting Temptations (soundtrack)	
"He Still Loves Me"	2003	Walter Williams Sr.	The Fighting Temptations (soundtrack)	
"Time to Come Home"	2003	Melba Moore, Angie Stone	The Fighting Temptations (soundtrack)	
"Everything I Do"	2003	Bilal	The Fighting Temptations (soundtrack)	
"Naïve"	2003	Solange Knowles, Da Brat	Solo Star	
"Bienvenue"	2003	IAM	Revoir un printemps	
"My Man"	2004	—N/a	Destiny Fulfilled	
"My First Time"	2004	—N/a	Live at Wembley	
"All That I'm Lookin' For" (Note: Also released as "Sex Kitten".)	2005	Kitten K. Sera, Kelly Rowland	The Katrina CD	
"So Amazing"	2005	Stevie Wonder	So Amazing: An All-Star Tribute to Luther Vandross	
"A Woman Like Me"	2006	—N/a	The Pink Panther	
"When I First Saw You"	2006	Jamie Foxx	Dreamgirls: Music from the Motion Picture	
"Flaws and All"	2007	—N/a	Why Did I Get Married? (soundtrack)	
"Pray"	2007	Jay-Z	American Gangster	
"I'd Rather Go Blind"	2008	—N/a	Cadillac Records: Music from the Motion Picture	
"Trust in Me"	2008	—N/a	Cadillac Records: Music from the Motion Picture	
"All I Could Do Was Cry"	2008	—N/a	Cadillac Records: Music from the Motion Picture	
"Once In A Lifetime"	2008	—N/a	Cadillac Records: Music from the Motion Picture	
"Smash into You"	2009	—N/a	Obsessed	
"Venus vs. Mars"	2009	Jay-Z	The Blueprint 3	
"See Me Now"	2010	Kanye West, Big Sean, Charlie Wilson	My Beautiful Dark Twisted Fantasy	
"Home for the Holidays"	2010	J. Cole	Friday Night Lights	
"Love a Woman"	2011	Mary J. Blige	My Life II... The Journey Continues (Act 1)	
"Young Forever" (Live)	2012	Jay-Z	Live in Brooklyn	
"Back to Black"	2013	André 3000	The Great Gatsby: Music from Baz Luhrmann's Film	
"God Made You Beautiful"	2013	—N/a	Life Is But a Dream	
"Rise Up"	2013	—N/a	Epic	
"Turnt"	2013	The-Dream, 2 Chainz	IV Play	
"You Changed"	2013	Kelly Rowland, Michelle Williams	Talk a Good Game	
"Dreams"	2014	Boots	Winter Spring Summer Fall	
"Feeling Myself"	2014	Nicki Minaj	The Pinkprint	
"Hymn for the Weekend"	2015	Coldplay	A Head Full of Dreams	
"Up&Up"	2015	Coldplay	A Head Full of Dreams	
"Haunted" (Michael Diamond Remix)	2015	—N/a	Fifty Shades of Grey (soundtrack)	
"Pink + White"	2016	Frank Ocean	Blonde	
"Family Feud"	2017	Jay-Z	4:44	
"Can I"	2019	Drake	Care Package	
"Sorry Not Sorry"	2021	DJ Khaled, Nas, Jay-Z, James Fauntleroy	Khaled Khaled	

== See also ==
- Beyoncé albums discography
- List of songs recorded by Beyoncé
- Destiny's Child discography
- The Carters
- List of songs recorded by Destiny's Child
