= King Richard =

King Richard normally refers to the three English monarchs.

== English monarchs ==
- Richard I of England or Richard the Lionheart (1157–1199)
- Richard II of England (1367–1400)
- Richard III of England (1452–1485)

Although no monarch has assumed the title King Richard IV, this title can sometimes refer to:

- Richard of Shrewsbury, 1st Duke of York, one of the Princes in the Tower
  - King Richard IV of England from Blackadder, a fictional version of the above
- Perkin Warbeck (1474–1499), a pretender who claimed to be Richard, Duke of York

== Other ==
- Richard of Cornwall, King of Germany from 1257 to 1272.
- King Richard, a font by Ray Larabie
- the nickname of Richard Williams (born 1942), American tennis coach
  - King Richard, a 2021 biopic about the tennis coach
    - King Richard, the soundtrack of the film
- the nickname of Dick Reynolds (1915–2002), Australian rules footballer
- the nickname of Richard Petty (born 1937), former NASCAR stock car driver
- the nickname of Dick Burleson (born 1948), former enduro motorcycle champion
- the nickname of Richard Brodeur (born 1952), retired Canadian ice hockey goaltender
- A character in the Guardians of Time series by Marianne Curley
- King Richard's Faire, a renaissance re-enactment fair held annually in Carver, Massachusetts
