= Yun Bai =

American artist

- Born: Beijing, China
- Education: Agnes Scott College
- Notable work: Porn Flowers
- Website: yunbai.com

Yun Bai is an American neo-feminist pop artist and painter who is famous for her work with mixed mediums, including porn magazines, ping pong balls, machetes, and traditional fine arts mediums such as oil paint and watercolor. Bai is alternatively known as "YunnyBunny."

== Early life and education ==
Born in Beijing, China, Bai immigrated to the United States when she was age 6. Bai was raised in the deep South. She lived in Tallahassee, Florida, for 12 years before being awarded an achievement scholarship of $28,000 from August 1997 to May 2001 to pursue a degree at Agnes Scott College, a private, liberal arts women's college in Atlanta, Georgia. In May 2001, Bai graduated with a bachelor's degree in studio art (painting) from Agnes Scott College.

During Bai's college years, her mother was diagnosed with cancer, and her parents filed for bankruptcy. As a result, she worked as an exotic dancer to pay for the rest of her undergraduate education.

== Career ==
As a contemporary feminist artist, Bai works with explicit materials to create messages of female empowerment in her work.

Bai was a guest speaker at a lecture at Georgia State University in Atlanta, Georgia, in June 2003. She also participated as a panelist at the Atlanta Contemporary Art Center in June 2003.

== Recognition ==
In 2015, Bai was noted in Oyster Magazine, Ms. magazine, and BWW News Desk for her work in the #YesAllWomen Benefit at the Los Angeles Women's Center . She was noted in New American Paintings.

Bai was named one of "Top 10 Emerging Artists by LA Weekly in January 2006. Bai was recognized by The Atlanta Journal-Constitution, Art Papers magazine, ArtAsiaPacific, World Journal, and The Wall Street Journal in December 2007, as well as on the cover of The London Magazine (UK's oldest literary publication est. 1732) in April/May 2012. ARTSPROJEKT selected Bai to be amongst their cache of artists on their international merchandising platform in 2010.
