= Edna St. Vincent Millay bibliography =

A bibliography of Edna St. Vincent Millay.

== Poetry ==
=== Well-known poems ===
- "Renascence" (1912)
- "The Penitent" (1918)
- "First Fig" (1920)
- "Euclid alone has looked on Beauty bare" (1922)
- "The Ballad of the Harp-Weaver" (1922)
- "I, Being Born a Woman and Distressed" (1923)
- "Dirge without Music" (1928)

=== Books of poetry ===
- Edna St. Vincent Millay (1917). Renascence: and other poems. Harper & brothers. (title poem first published under name E. Vincent Millay in The Lyric Year, 1912; collection includes God's World), M. Kennerley, 1917. reprinted, Books for Libraries Press, 1972.
- A Few Figs From Thistles: Poems and Four Sonnets, F. Shay, 1920. 2nd [enlarged] Edna St. Vincent Millay (1921). A Few Figs from Thistles: Poems and Sonnets. F. Shay.
- Edna St. Vincent Millay (1921). Second April. Harper & Brothers. (poems; includes Spring, Ode to Silence, and The Beanstalk); reprinted, Harper, 1935
- The Ballad of the Harp-Weaver, F. Shay, 1922. Reprinted as "The Harp-Weaver" in The Harp-Weaver, and Other Poems (includes "The Concert", "Euclid Alone has Looked on Beauty Bare", and "Sonnets from an Ungrafted Tree"), Harper, 1923.
- Poems, M. Secker, 1923.
- (Under pseudonym Nancy Boyd) Distressing Dialogues, preface by Edna St. Vincent Millay, Harper, 1924.
- The Buck in the Snow, and Other Poems, Harper, 1928 (includes The Buck in the Snow [also see below] and On Hearing a Symphony of Beethoven).
- Fatal Interview (sonnets), Harper, 1931.
- Wine from These Grapes (poems; includes "Epitaph for the Race of Man" and "In the Grave No Flower"), Harper, 1934.
- (Translator with George Dillon and author of introduction) Charles Baudelaire, Flowers of Evil, Harper, 1936.
- Conversation at Midnight (narrative poem), Harper, 1937.
- Huntsman, What Quarry? (poems), Harper, 1939.
- There Are No Islands, Any More: Lines Written in Passion and in Deep Concern for England, France, and My Own Country, Harper, 1940.
- Make Bright the Arrows: 1940 Notebook (poems), Harper, 1940.
- The Murder of Lidice (poem), Harper, 1942.
- Second April and The Buck in the Snow, introduction by William Rose Benét, Harper, 1950.
- Mine the Harvest (poems), edited by Norma Millay, Harper, 1954.
- Take Up the Song, Harper, 1986. Reprinted with music by William Albright as Take Up the Song: Soprano Solo, Mixed Chorus, and Piano, Henmar Press, 1994.
- Colin Falck (ed) Selected Poems: The Centenary Edition, New York, NY : Harper Collins Publishers, 1991. ISBN 9780060931681, OCLC 416149843
- Early Poems. Edited by Holly Peppe. Penguin, 1998. Penguin Twentieth-Century Classics.
- Millay, Edna St. Vincent; Jackson, Timothy F.; Peppe, Holly (2016). Selected poems of Edna St. Vincent Millay. New Haven. ISBN 978-0-300-21396-6. OCLC 923562303.

== Plays ==
- (And director) Aria da capo (one-act play in verse; first produced in Greenwich Village, NY, December 5, 1919), M. Kennerley, 1921 (also see below).
- The Lamp and the Bell (five-act play; first produced June 18, 1921), F. Shay, 1921 (also see below).
- Two Slatterns and a King: A Moral Interlude (play), Stewart Kidd, 1921.
- Three Plays (contains Two Slatterns and a King, Aria da capo, and The Lamp and the Bell), Harper, 1926.
- (Author of libretto) The King's Henchman (three-act play; first produced in New York, February 17, 1927), Harper, 1927.
- The Princess Marries the Page (one-act play), Harper, 1932.
- Early Works of Edna St. Vincent Millay: Selected Poetry and Three Plays. Edited by Stacy Carson Hubbard. Barnes & Noble, 2006. The plays are Aria da Capo, The Lamp and the Bell, and Two Slatterns and a King.

== Letters ==
- Letters of Edna St. Vincent Millay, edited by Allan Ross Macdougall, Harper, 1952.
- Into the World's Great Heart: Selected Letters of Edna St. Vincent Millay, edited by Timothy F. Jackson, foreword by Holly Peppe, Yale University Press, 2023.
