= Beyoncé albums discography =

Albums by American singer

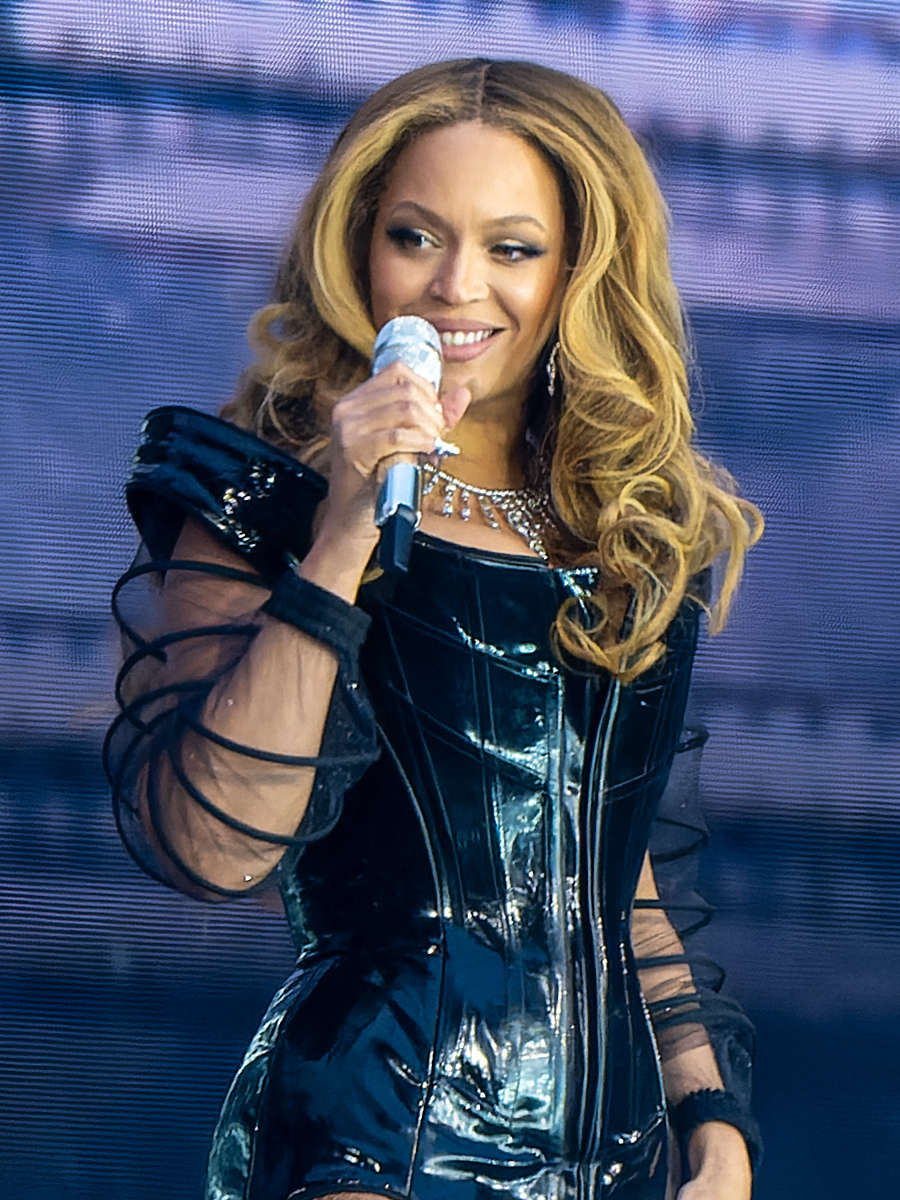
- Beyoncé performing during the Renaissance World Tour, 2023
- Studio albums: 8
- Extended plays: 5
- Soundtrack albums: 1
- Live albums: 6
- Compilation albums: 5
- Collaborative albums: 1

American singer Beyoncé has released eight studio albums, five live albums, five compilation albums, one soundtrack album, two karaoke albums, and five EPs. She is one of the best-selling music artists of all time, with estimated sales of over 200 million records. The Recording Industry Association of America (RIAA) listed Beyoncé as the top certified artist of the 2000s decade, with a total of 64 certifications.

Beyoncé's career began as the lead vocalist of the girl group Destiny's Child. During the group's hiatus, she released her first solo album, Dangerously in Love (2003), which debuted at number one on the US Billboard 200. With "Crazy in Love" and Dangerously in Love, Beyoncé became the first female artist to top the singles and albums charts simultaneously in both the United States and the United Kingdom. As of 2011, Dangerously in Love had sold 11 million copies worldwide, making it one of the best-selling albums of the 21st century. After the disbandment of Destiny's Child in 2005, Beyoncé released her second studio album, B'Day (2006), which debuted atop the Billboard 200 and was certified five-times platinum by the RIAA. As of 2013, the album had sold over eight million copies worldwide.

Beyoncé's third studio album, I Am... Sasha Fierce (2008), debuted at number one on the US Billboard 200 and was certified seven-times platinum by the RIAA. By 2012, the album had sold 10 million copies worldwide. Beyoncé's next three studio albums—4 (2011), Beyoncé (2013), and Lemonade (2016)—all reached number one on the Billboard 200. Beyoncé was surprise-released on the iTunes Store on December 13, 2013, becoming the fastest-selling album on the store worldwide within three days of its release. Lemonade was the best-selling album of 2016, with over 2.5 million copies sold worldwide.

Beyoncé's seventh studio album, Renaissance (2022), became her seventh consecutive album to debut at number one on the Billboard 200 and received a double platinum certification by the RIAA. Cowboy Carter (2024), Beyoncé's eighth studio album, reached number one in various countries worldwide and made her the first female artist to debut her first eight solo albums atop the Billboard 200, as well as the first Black woman to reach number one on the US Top Country Albums chart.

As a part of the Carters, Beyoncé released the collaborative album Everything Is Love (2018) with her husband Jay-Z. She curated the soundtrack album The Lion King: The Gift for the photorealistic animated film The Lion King (2019). Both albums reached number two on the Billboard 200 and received gold certifications by the RIAA. Beyoncé's first four live albums—Live at Wembley (2004), The Beyoncé Experience Live (2007), I Am... Yours: An Intimate Performance at Wynn Las Vegas (2009), and I Am... World Tour (2010)—all received multi-platinum certifications in the United States. Her fifth live album, Homecoming: The Live Album (2019), which chronicles her 2018 Coachella performance, reached number four on the Billboard 200 and received a gold certification by the RIAA.

== Studio albums ==
=== Solo albums ===
List of studio albums
Title	Album details	Peak chart positions										Sales	Certifications
Title	Album details	US	AUS	CAN	FRA	GER	IRE	NLD	NZ	SWI	UK	Sales	Certifications
Dangerously in Love	Released: June 20, 2003; Label: Music World, Columbia; Format: CD, LP, digital download	1	2	1	14	1	1	4	8	2	1	US: 5,000,000	RIAA: 7× Platinum; ARIA: 3× Platinum; BPI: 4× Platinum; BVMI: 3× Gold; IFPI SWI: Platinum; MC: 3× Platinum; NVPI: Gold; RMNZ: 2× Platinum; SNEP: 2× Gold
B'Day	Released: August 31, 2006; Label: Music World, Sony Urban, Columbia; Format: CD, CD/DVD, LP, digital download	1	8	3	12	5	3	5	8	2	3	US: 3,410,000	RIAA: 5× Platinum; ARIA: Platinum; BPI: Platinum+Gold; BVMI: Gold; IFPI SWI: Gold; IRMA: 3× Platinum; MC: 2× Platinum; NVPI: Gold; RMNZ: 2× Platinum; SNEP: Gold
I Am... Sasha Fierce	Released: November 12, 2008; Label: Music World, Columbia; Format: CD, CD/DVD, digital download	1	3	6	20	17	1	6	3	7	2	US: 3,200,000	RIAA: 7× Platinum; ARIA: 5× Platinum; BPI: 6× Platinum; BVMI: 3× Gold; IFPI SWI: Gold; IRMA: 2× Platinum; MC: 6× Platinum; NVPI: Platinum; RMNZ: 5× Platinum
4	Released: June 28, 2011; Label: Parkwood, Columbia; Format: CD, digital download	1	2	3	2	5	1	2	3	1	1	US: 1,500,000	RIAA: 4× Platinum; ARIA: 2× Platinum; BPI: 3× Platinum; BVMI: Gold; IRMA: Platinum; MC: 2× Platinum; RMNZ: 3× Platinum; SNEP: Gold
Beyoncé	Released: December 13, 2013; Label: Parkwood, Columbia; Format: CD, CD/DVD, CD/Blu-ray, LP, digital download	1	1	1	10	11	2	1	2	4	2	US: 2,300,000	RIAA: 6× Platinum; ARIA: 2× Platinum; BPI: 2× Platinum; BVMI: Gold; IFPI SWI: Gold; IRMA: Gold; MC: 3× Platinum; RMNZ: 4× Platinum; SNEP: Gold
Lemonade	Released: April 23, 2016; Label: Parkwood, Columbia; Format: CD/DVD, LP, digital download, online streaming	1	1	1	7	3	1	1	1	2	1	US: 1,554,000	RIAA: 4× Platinum; ARIA: 2× Platinum; BPI: 2× Platinum; BVMI: Gold; IFPI SWI: Gold; MC: 2× Platinum; RMNZ: 2× Platinum; SNEP: Gold
Renaissance	Released: July 29, 2022; Label: Parkwood, Columbia; Formats: Box set, CD, digital download, streaming, LP	1	1	1	1	2	1	1	1	3	1	US: 335,000	RIAA: 2× Platinum; ARIA: Gold; BPI: Platinum; MC: Platinum; RMNZ: Platinum; SNEP: Platinum
Cowboy Carter	Released: March 29, 2024; Label: Parkwood, Columbia; Formats: CD, digital download, streaming, LP	1	1	1	1	1	1	1	1	1	1	US: 257,000	RIAA: Platinum; BPI: Gold; MC: Platinum; RMNZ: Platinum; SNEP: Platinum

=== Collaborative albums ===
Title	Album details	Peak chart positions										Sales	Certifications
Title	Album details	US	AUS	CAN	FRA	GER	IRE	NLD	NZ	SWI	UK	Sales	Certifications
Everything Is Love (with Jay-Z as the Carters)	Released: June 16, 2018; Label: Parkwood, Columbia, UMG, Roc Nation; Formats: CD, streaming, digital download	2	6	4	44	23	10	4	12	5	5	US: 70,000	RIAA: Gold; BPI: Silver; MC: Gold

== Soundtrack albums ==
List of soundtrack albums, with selected chart positions and sales figures
Title	Album details	Peak chart positions										Sales	Certifications
Title	Album details	US	US R&B /HH	US OST	AUS	CAN	FRA	GER	NLD	NZ	SWI	Sales	Certifications
The Lion King: The Gift	Released: July 19, 2019; Label: Parkwood, Columbia; Format: Digital download	2	1	1	12	4	28	48	3	16	20	US: 11,000	RIAA: Gold; BPI: Silver

== Live albums ==
List of live albums
Title	Album details	Peak chart positions									Certifications	Sales
Title	Album details	US	US R&B /HH	AUS	CAN	GER	JPN	NLD	SWI	UK	Certifications	Sales
Live at Wembley	Released: April 26, 2004; Label: Columbia; Format: CD/DVD	17	8	—	—	59	8	—	73	—	RIAA: 2× Platinum; ARIA: 2× Platinum; BPI: Gold; RIAJ: Gold	US: 197,000 (Note: United States album sales as of October 2010.)
The Beyoncé Experience Live	Released: November 16, 2007; Label: Columbia; Format: CD/DVD, digital download	—	—	—	—	—	22	—	—	—	RIAA: 3× Platinum; ARIA: 2× Platinum; BPI: Gold	
I Am... Yours: An Intimate Performance at Wynn Las Vegas	Released: November 23, 2009; Label: Columbia; Format: CD/DVD, digital download	—	—	—	—	85	43	66	—	150	RIAA: 2× Platinum; ARIA: Platinum	
Live in Vegas Instrumentals	Released: September 28, 2010 (US); Label: Columbia; Format: Digital download	—	—	—	—	—	—	—	—	—		
I Am... World Tour	Released: November 26, 2010; Label: Columbia; Format: CD/DVD, digital download	—	40	—	—	—	76	—	—	—	RIAA: 2× Platinum; ARIA: Platinum; BPI: Platinum	
Homecoming: The Live Album	Released: April 17, 2019; Label: Parkwood, Columbia; Format: Digital download, streaming, LP	4	2	18	7	41	—	9	15	25	RIAA: Gold; RMNZ: Gold	
"—" denotes items which were not released in that country or failed to chart.

== Compilation albums ==
List of compilation albums
Title	Album details	Peak chart positions				Certifications
Title	Album details	US	US R&B /HH	US Dance	CRO	Certifications
Beyoncé Karaoke Hits, Vol. I	Released: March 11, 2008 (US); Label: Columbia; Format: Digital download	—	—	—	—	
Dangerously in Love / Live at Wembley	Released: December 9, 2008 (US); Label: Columbia; Format: CD/DVD	—	—	—	37	
Above and Beyoncé: Video Collection & Dance Mixes	Released: June 16, 2009 (US); Label: Columbia; Format: CD/DVD, digital download	35	23	2	—	
Beyoncé: Platinum Edition	Released: November 24, 2014; Label: Parkwood, Columbia; Format: CD/DVD, digital download	—	—	—	—	BPI: Silver
B'Day (20th Anniversary Edition)	Released: September 4, 2026; Label: Parkwood, Columbia; Format: CD, LP	8	2	—	—	
"—" denotes items which were not released in that country or failed to chart.

== Extended plays ==
List of extended plays
Title	Details	Peak chart positions						Certifications	Sales
Title	Details	US	US R&B /HH	US Dance	US Latin	NZ	UK	Certifications	Sales
True Star: A Private Performance	Released: 2004 (US); Label: Sony Music; Format: CD	—	—	—	—	—	—		
Irreemplazable	Released: August 27, 2007; Label: Columbia; Format: CD/DVD, CD, digital download	105	41	—	3	—	—		US: 57,000 (as of 2010)
Heat	Released: February 2011 (US); Label: Columbia; Format: CD	—	—	—	—	—	—		
4: The Remix	Released: April 23, 2012; Label: Parkwood, Columbia; Format: Digital download	— (Note: 4: The Remix did not enter the Billboard 200 but did peak at number 181 on the Top Current Albums chart.)	30	11	—	—	—	BPI: Silver	
Beyoncé: More Only	Released: November 24, 2014; Label: Parkwood, Columbia; Format: Digital download	8	3	—	—	24	41		US: 43,000; UK: 60,000
"—" denotes items which were not released in that country or failed to chart.

== See also ==
- Beyoncé singles discography
- List of songs recorded by Beyoncé
- Destiny's Child discography
- The Carters
- List of songs recorded by Destiny's Child
