= Neofeminism =

Feminist theory

Neofeminism is a contemporary feminist perspective that supports empowerment through the embrace of femininity, emphasizing personal choice, and self-expression. Rooted in the belief that autonomy can coexist with the celebration of appearance, lifestyle, and sexuality, neofeminism promotes an individual's freedom to define their own identities across personal and public spheres.

Often associated with pop culture figures like Beyoncé, neofeminism highlights themes such as independence, sexual agency, and self-love. It challenges restrictive gender norms while affirming that femininity itself can be a powerful and liberating force.

Neofeminism embraces intersectionality and critiques the social construction of the gender binary, advocating for a more inclusive and individualized approach to feminism. It also recognizes that much of the psychological harm done to boys and men is caused by societal pressures to embody and reinforce masculinity.

== Origins ==
The term has been used since the beginning of second-wave feminism to refer broadly to any recent manifestation of feminist activism, mainly to distinguish it from the first-wave feminism of the suffragettes. It was used in the title of a best-selling 1982 book by Jacques J. Zephir about French feminist Simone de Beauvoir, Le Neo-Feminisme de Simone de Beauvoir (Paris: Denoel/Gonthier 9782282202945). Zephir used the term to differentiate de Beauvoir's views from writers described as "Neofeminist", such as literary theorist Luce Irigaray, who indicated in her own writing that women had an essentialist femininity that could express itself in écriture féminine (feminine writing/language), among other ways. Céline T. Léon has written, "one can only identify the existentialist's [de Beauvoir's] glorification of transcendence with the type of feminism that Luce Irigaray denounces in Ce sexe qui n'en est pas un: 'Woman simply equal to men would be like them and therefore not women'."

De Beauvoir's views were quite the opposite:

Over and against the neofeminists' attempts at getting rid of phallogocentrism and creating a new [feminine] writing style, she denounces as a contradiction this imprisonment of women in a ghetto of difference/singularity: "I consider it almost antifeminist to say that there is a feminine nature which expresses itself differently, that a woman speaks her body more than a man."

Later writers and popular culture commentators appear to have continued this use of the term to describe essentialist feminism. It has been used by sociologists to describe a new popular culture movement that "celebrates both the feminine body and women's political achievements":

Women do and should realize their autonomy through their femininity in its "Elle magazine form" (Chollet 2004). Neofeminism champions the free choice of women in appearance, lifestyle, and sexuality. This consumerist orientation retains the advances of legal equality in political space but urges women to celebrate their femininity in their personal lives, a category that includes careers, clothing, and sexuality.

== Positive-Sum Feminism ==
Neofeminism's focus on personal empowerment, sexual agency, and the celebration of femininity in popular culture, rejects zero-sum perceptions of gender relations in favor of a positive-sum (or non-zero-sum) framework. This viewpoint suggests that advancing gender equality—by empowering women, challenging outdated norms, and fostering inclusivity—brings overall societal advantages for everyone, rather than reducing opportunities or well-being for men. Examples include economic expansion from women's workforce participation, healthier relationships via shared emotional freedoms, and reductions in harms associated with toxic masculinity, such as mental health crises. This win-win approach supports neofeminism's focus on individual choice and mutual liberation, contrasting with critiques that frame earlier feminist efforts as more adversarial.

== Other uses ==
The feminist film scholar Hilary Radner has used the term neofeminism to characterize the iteration of feminism advocated by Hollywood's spate of romantic comedies inaugurated by Pretty Woman (Gary Marshall, 1990) often described as postfeminist. Radner argues that the origins of neofeminism can be traced back to figures such as Helen Gurley Brown writing in the 1960s, meaning that the term postfeminism (suggesting that these ideas emerged after second-wave feminism) is potentially misleading.

== See also ==
- Anti-abortion feminism
- Difference feminism
- Equity feminism
- French feminism
- Gaze
- Objectification
- Postgenderism
- Sociology of the family § Sociology of motherhood
