= 4: The Remix =

EP / Remix album by Beyoncé
- Released: April 23, 2012
- Recorded: 2010–2011
- Genres: Dance; R&B
- Length: 36:51
- Labels: Parkwood; Columbia
- Producers: Beyoncé; Diplo; Switch; Dave Audé; Isa Machine; Lars B; DJ Escape; Tony Coluccio; Wictor Mysliwiec; Michel Bojanowicz; Jimek

Beyoncé chronology
4 (2011)	4: The Remix (2012)	Beyoncé (2013)

4: The Remix is an extended play (EP) by American singer-songwriter Beyoncé. It was released on April 23, 2012, by Parkwood Entertainment and Columbia Records. Prior to its release, Beyoncé organized a remix competition for her then-upcoming single "End of Time". The remix was chosen by a judging panel and the winner of the competition was Radzimir "Jimek" Dębski.

4: The Remix contains six remixes of the songs from Beyoncé's fourth studio album 4 (2011). After its release, the EP failed to enter the US Billboard 200, debuting at number 11 on the US Top Dance/Electronic Albums and at number 30 on the Top R&B/Hip-Hop Albums.

== Background ==
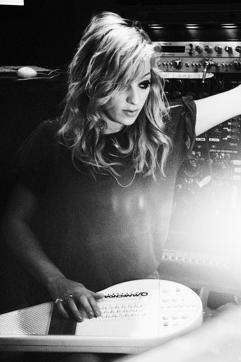
Isabella Summers (pictured) of the band Florence and the Machine was one of the remix judges.

On February 8, 2012, it was announced through Beyoncé's website and a press release issued by Parkwood Entertainment and Columbia Records that "End of Time" would be released as the fifth single from her fourth studio album, 4. Preceding the song's release, a remix competition for the song began in association with audio sharing site SoundCloud, which enabled public voting on the submission of remixes by participants. The contest was open to entrants in 25 countries from February 8, 2012, to March 9, 2012; it was announced that the remix winner would win a cash prize of US$4,000 and that the remix would be included on her then-unspecified upcoming release, which was later titled 4: The Remix.

Over two thousand entries had been uploaded to SoundCloud by March 4, 2012, and the following day another press release was issued, announcing the members of the international judging panel who would choose the winner of the competition; the panel consisted of Beyoncé, British musician Isabella Summers of Florence and the Machine, Dutch music producer and DJ Afrojack, the duo DJ and Polish producing team WAWA, New York premier DJ Jus-Ske, and Oscar-winning producer and composer Giorgio Moroder. The public was able to vote for entries and SoundCloud, and the top 50 ranked remixes were reviewed by the announced panel of judges; the originality, creativity and musicality of these 50 remixes were taken into consideration when choosing the winner. On April 17, Radzimir "Jimek" Dębski from Poland was announced as the winner in a press release.

== Release ==
On April 17, 2012, the release of the remix extended play (EP) titled 4: The Remix was announced for April 24, and its cover artwork was revealed. It was released a day earlier, by Parkwood Entertainment and Columbia Records. The album consists of six remixes of songs from Beyoncé's fourth studio album 4 (2011). It comprises a Dave Audé remix of "Run the World (Girls)", an Isa Machine remix of "Countdown", a Lars B remix of "Best Thing I Never Had", a DJ Escape and Tony Coluccio remix of "Love on Top" and two remixes of "End of Time"—one by WAWA and the other by Jimek.

== Commercial performance ==
4: The Remix debuted on the UK R&B Albums Chart at number 28, and at number 44 on the UK Budget Albums for the week of May 5, 2012. For the issue of Billboard dated May 12, 4: The Remix debuted at number 11 on the US Top Dance/Electronic Albums, and number 30 on the Top R&B/Hip Hop Albums.

== Track listing ==
Credits are adapted from iTunes Store.

4: The Remix track listing
No.	Title	Writer(s)	Length
1.	"Run the World (Girls)" (Dave Audé Club Remix)	Beyoncé; Terius Nash; Adidja Palmer; David Taylor; Nick van de Wall; Wesley Pentz	8:32
2.	"Countdown" (Isa Machine Remix)	Beyoncé; Shea Taylor; Nash; Ester Dean; Julie Frost; Michael Bivins; Nathan Morris; Wanya Morris; Cainon Lamb	3:30
3.	"Best Thing I Never Had" (Lars B Remix)	Beyoncé; S. Taylor; Antonio Dixon; Babyface; Caleb McCampbell; Larry Griffin, Jr.; Patrick Smith	7:10
4.	"Love on Top" (DJ Escape & Tony Coluccio Remix)	Beyoncé; S. Taylor; Nash	8:06
5.	"End of Time" (WAWA Extended)	Beyoncé; S. Taylor; Nash; D. Taylor	5:35
6.	"End of Time" (JIMEK Remix)	Beyoncé; S. Taylor; Nash; D. Taylor	3:55
Total length:			36:51

== Personnel ==
Credits for 4: The Remix, taken from the liner notes of the EP.

- Beyoncé – performer, composer, lyricist, executive producer, producer
- Terius "The-Dream" Nash – composer, lyricist
- Thomas "Diplo" Pentz – composer, lyricist, additional producer
- Dave "Switch" Taylor – composer, lyricist, additional producer
- Adidja "Vybz Kartel" Palmer – composer, lyricist
- Nick "Afrojack" Wall – composer, lyricist
- Danny Dunlap – additional bass, additional guitar
- Dave Audé – additional remix, producer
- Shea Taylor – composer, lyricist
- Ester Dean – composer, lyricist
- Cainon Lamb – composer, lyricist
- Julie Frost – composer, lyricist
- Michael Bivins – composer, lyricist
- Nathan Morris – composer, lyricist
- Wanya Morris – composer, lyricist
- Peter Hanson – engineer
- Isa Machine – remixer
- Kenneth "Babyface" Edmonds – composer, lyricist
- Antonio Dixon – composer, lyricist
- Patrick "j.Que" Smith – composer, lyricist
- Larry Griffin Jr. – composer, lyricist
- Calleb Mccampbell – composer, lyricist
- Marconi de Morais – rhodes, organ, bass, solo
- Lars Behrenroth – remixer
- DJ Escape – remixer
- Tony Coluccio – remixer
- Dom Capello – mixer
- Wictor Mysliwiec – additional remix, producer
- Michel Bojanowicz – additional remix, producer
- Angelo "Pepe" Skordos – A&R Coordinator
- Bill Coleman – A&R Coordinator
- JIMEK – remixer, remix guitars, remix rhodes, remix engineer, remix producer, remix drum machine

== Charts ==
Weekly chart performance for 4: The Remix
Chart (2012)	Peak position
UK Budget Albums (OCC)	44
UK R&B Albums (OCC)	28
US Billboard 200	181
US Top Dance/Electronic Albums (Billboard)	11
US Top R&B/Hip Hop Albums (Billboard)	30

== Certifications ==
Region	Certification	Certified units/sales
United Kingdom (BPI)	Silver	60,000^{‡}
^{‡} Sales+streaming figures based on certification alone.

== Release history ==
Release dates and formats for 4: The Remix
Region	Date	Format(s)	Label(s)	Ref.
United States	April 23, 2012	Digital download	Parkwood; Columbia	
