= Love a Woman =

Song by Mary J. Blige featuring Beyoncé

from the album My Life II... The Journey Continues (Act 1)
- Recorded: 2011
- Studio: MSR Studios (New York, NY)
- Genre: R&B
- Length: 4:31
- Label: Matriarch; Geffen
- Songwriters: Mary J. Blige; Sean Garrett; Beyoncé; Menardini Timothee
- Producers: Sean Garrett; Team S. Dot (co.); BridgeTown (add.)

"Love a Woman" is a song recorded by American R&B singer Mary J. Blige featuring Beyoncé from the former's tenth studio album My Life II... The Journey Continues (Act 1) (2011). It was written by Mary J. Blige, Beyoncé, Sean Garrett and Menardini Timothee while production was handled by Garrett, Team S. Dot and BridgeTown. Originally written for Beyoncé's fourth studio album 4 (2011), the singer felt that it did not fit with the sound she had created for her album, and she thought that it would be better if she recorded it as a duet with Blige instead.

"Love a Woman" is a down-tempo R&B ballad with live-instrumentation in which Beyoncé and Blige are teaching men about how to love their female partners. It received positive reviews from music critics who mostly praised the chemistry between Beyoncé and Blige on the duet as well as their vocals. Following the release of My Life II... The Journey Continues (Act 1), the song peaked at number eighty nine on the US Hot R&B/Hip-Hop Songs chart based on digital sales.

== Background and development ==
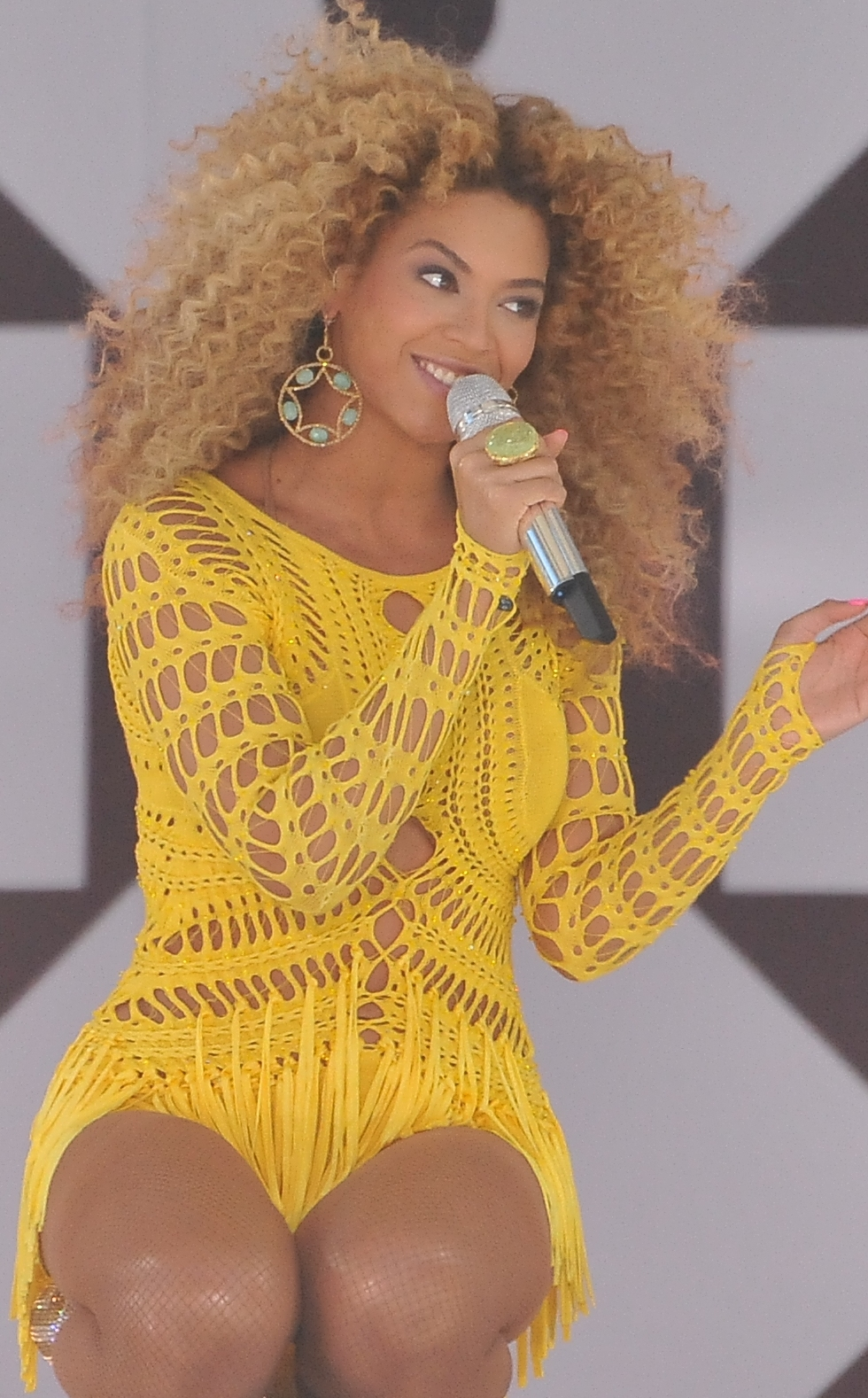
The song was originally written for Beyoncé's fourth studio album 4 but she decided to record it as a duet with Blige as she thought it would be a better fit.

"Love a Woman" was written by Mary J. Blige, Beyoncé, Sean Garrett and Menardini Timothee while production was handled by Garrett. Team S. Dot served as the co-producer of the song while BridgeTown served as the additional producer for it. On November 9, 2011, a snippet of "Love a Woman" appeared online. It was officially premiered on November 17, prior to the release of the album. The song was initially recorded by Beyoncé for her fourth studio album 4 (2011), but she thought that it would be a better fit as a duet with Blige. Blige further revealed in an interview that the song was sent to her after Beyoncé thought that it didn't fit her album and it was sent through her A&R people. She further added, "When the song came, her voice was on it completely and it was just amazing and I wasn't sure that they wanted to give me this record because it was so amazing." Blige further spoke about how she started the collaboration with Beyoncé on the song:

"The song was so amazing I had to be sure, as an artist, that she really was trying to give it to me. I was like 'is she really trying to give me this song, because it's pretty amazing.' They were like 'yes, but she wants to stay on it with you.' And I was like, 'Wow! Beyoncé? Thanks!' And you know I love and respect her to death so I wouldn't pass that chance up."

Blige further revealed that the song would be released as a single but was delayed due to Beyoncé's pregnancy at that time adding that, "whenever she's ready, if she's ever ready, I'm ready and it'll be great." During an interview with Rap-Up magazine, Garrett further spoke about the collaboration, saying, "I initially did the record for Beyoncé and then we just felt it would be an even bigger record with Beyoncé and Mary J. Blige... Both these women are two iconic female figures in the world, and what would be better than putting those two on a record? We felt it would be a really iconic move."

== Composition ==
"Love a Woman" is a down-tempo soulful R&B ballad with a female empowerment theme and live-sounding instruments. The soothing track starts off with Blige singing with a dark voice, "So you think you know how to love a woman/ But I think it's still some things you need to know." As the flowery instrumental builds with a serene piano melody and accentuating horns, Blige goes on to warn that a woman needs more than material things. A writer of Billboard magazine further noted that the song was schooling men on just how good to love a woman. During her lines, Beyoncé sings with a vibrato voice, "A woman / Needs you to make love to her / She needs more than sex / Oh, a real woman needs a real man / They don’t talk about it, be about it / Put that work in, still shows his woman real romance". According to Rob Markman of MTV News, "From there, the song plays as a lyrical how-to. Communication is a must, as is respect, but coming home late and being a one-minute man is a no-no." Writers further noted that the duet was inspired by the music from the 1990s including a new jack swing-era R&B production. Beyoncé and Blige further sing the lines "She doesn’t want makeup sex, she wants your respect." The song also has an extended bridge section during the 2:30 mark where Blige sings the lines "Pick up your phone…just to say you're still in love from time to time…" with a vocal styling which was compared to Michael Jackson's "Off the Wall" era. It ends with the sound of sparkler synths. Jada Gomez-Lacayo of HipHopDx compared the song with Aaron Hall's material. Ayanna Guyhto of Yahoo! Music compared the first minute of the song with Busta Rhymes' songs due to the speedy wordplay. She further noted that it was similar to the songs by Keith Sweat from the 1990s.

== Critical reception ==
Rob Markman of MTV News wrote that the singers "display good chemistry on the song". The Washington Post's Sarah Godfrey classified "Love a Woman" as one of the best tracks on the album adding that "The ballad, with its cheesy, delightful... R&B production, blasts the notion that MJB is all raw power and Beyoncé is all chilly technique — the women are both bold and great here, with a slight advantage going to Blige." Becky Bain of the website Idolator commented that Garrett who served as a writer for the song "clearly knows how to love a woman right". A writer of Rap-Up magazine noted that Blige and Beyoncé "showcase their powerful pipes" as they tell their men what they want from a relationship. Brooklyne Gipson of Black Entertainment Television wrote that the song was one of the most appealing on the album, further describing it as a "breathtaking duet". Martyn Young of the website musicOMH described the song as "a classy duet between two of contemporary RnB’s most striking voices". Siobhan Kane of the website Consequence of Sound noted that Blige and Beyoncé obviously enjoyed "the soaring nature of the song", while Alex Young of the same publication described it as a "lesson in love". Nathan S. of DJBooth described the song as an "inter-generational diva duet that sounds so ‘90s I half expected Keith Sweat to jump in". Trent Fitzgerald of PopCrush graded the song with four out of five stars and commented, "'Love a Woman' is a melodic song with a ’90s-sounding feel that will surely get spins on urban radio and quiet storm formats. Forget Dr. Phil, MJB and Ms. B is all you need to help you maintain a loving relationship with your partner."

Ayanna Guyhto of Yahoo! Music commented that Blige and Beyoncé combined their "superpowers" in the studio to make the "forceful ballad". She further commented, "The breakdown is where the listener really gets to hear the symmetry of these two powerhouse vocals. Neither diva overpowers the other. Right where [Beyoncé] leaves off, Mary J. picks up. And vice versa... Although either of these R&B divas could carry 'Love a Woman' with no problem, some might say that the song makes more of an impact with their deliveries combined. Blige's seasoned soul coupled with Bey's creamy delivery is a mood to behold." Andy Gill of The Independent wrote that Beyoncé "act[s] as a Greek chorus" to the song. Joey Guerra of the Houston Chronicle noted that "Love a Woman" is a soulful, old-school ballad "that brings out the best in both singers". Writing that Blige is "particularly heavy" on the R&B vibes of the song, Andrew Martin of Prefix Magazine further commented that "without a doubt, it's sure to gain some stream whenever radio DJs catch wind of it. Why? Because 'Love a Woman' features silky production, strong harmonies, and guest vocals from Beyoncé. Yeah, there's no stopping this one." Katie Hasty of HitFix commented that "It's actually a pretty standard list of grievances and explanations, but the real guts of the thing is when the two light up, to bring out the best vocal performances in each other, shooting you straight back to the 1990s." Kevin Ritchie of Now gave a mixed review for the song saying that it aims "for posterity rather than chemistry". Similarly, Adam Markovitz of Entertainment Weekly described the duet as "snoozy".

== Chart performance ==
The song peaked at number eighty nine on the US Hot R&B/Hip-Hop Songs chart and spent three weeks in total on that ranking. It also peaked at number 50 on the US Hot R&B/Hip-Hop Digital Songs chart.

== Charts ==
Chart (2011–2012)	Peak position
South Korea International (Circle)	18
US Hot R&B/Hip-Hop Songs (Billboard)	89
