= I, being born a woman and distressed =

1923 poem by Edna St. Vincent Millay

"I, being born a woman and distressed" is a poem by American author Edna St. Vincent Millay. The poem appeared in Millay's 1923 collection The Harp-Weaver and Other Poems. The first-person speaker of the fourteen-line, Italian sonnet addresses a potential lover. She confesses to an intense physical attraction but denies the possibility of any emotional or intellectual connection.

== Text ==
I, being born a woman and distressed
By all the needs and notions of my kind,
Am urged by your propinquity to find
Your person fair, and feel a certain zest
To bear your body's weight upon my breast:
So subtly is the fume of life designed,
To clarify the pulse and cloud the mind,
And leave me once again undone, possessed.
Think not for this, however, the poor treason
Of my stout blood against my staggering brain,
I shall remember you with love, or season
My scorn with pity,—let me make it plain:
I find this frenzy insufficient reason
For conversation when we meet again.

== Interpretations ==
The speaker of the poem openly describes her "zest/To bear [another person's] body's weight upon [her] breast" in a physical "frenzy" (Millay 4-5, 13). This blunt admission of female sexual desire in a woman's voice has led some readers to view the sonnet as a "frank, feminist poem" in which Millay "acknowledg[es] her biological needs as a woman that leave her 'undone, possessed.'" What is perhaps more groundbreaking than the honesty with which Millay describes sexual desire is her speaker's refusal to couple desire with love; the physical is "insufficient reason/For conversation when [the lovers] meet again" (Millay 13-14). She offers her sexual partner neither "love" nor "pity" (Millay 11, 12). This poem might serve as evidence that Millay truly was an emblem of the New Woman in "pursuit of authentic intimate relations without interference from artificial constraints, legal or social, or their psychological residue, jealousy."

Rather than interpreting the conflict of the poem as an interpersonal one, some critics view the conflict as an internalized "battle of blood against brain." The body may "cloud the mind" of the speaker, but her "staggering brain" loses to her own "stout blood," not to her lover's moves in some sexual contest (Millay 7, 10). By positioning the woman as subject, not object, Millay simultaneously fulfills and subverts the conventions of the sonnet.
