= Intégral: The Journal of Applied Musical Thought =

Academic journal

- Discipline: Music theory
- Language: English

Publication details
- History: 1987–present

Standard abbreviations
- ISO 4: Intégral

Indexing
- ISSN: 1073-6913

Links
- Journal homepage

Intégral: The Journal of Applied Musical Thought (ISSN 1073-6913) is a peer-reviewed, online and open-access academic journal specializing in music theory and analysis. It began publication in 1987, under the auspices of graduate students in music theory at the Eastman School of Music. According to its website, "the journal pursues an implicit mandate to explore and exploit the increasing pluralism of the music-theoretic field."

The journal's first editor was John Adrian. It is currently co-edited by Matt Chiu and Derek Myler.
