= King Richard (soundtrack) =

King Richard (Original Motion Picture Soundtrack)

Film score by Kris Bowers
- Released: November 12, 2021
- Recorded: 2021
- Studios: Eastwood Scoring Stage, Warner Bros. Studios, Burbank, California
- Genre: Film score
- Length: 44:20
- Label: WaterTower Music
- Producer: Kris Bowers

Kris Bowers chronology
Respect (2021)	King Richard (2021)	Bridgerton (season two) (2022)

King Richard (Original Motion Picture Soundtrack) is the soundtrack to the 2021 film of the same name directed by Reinaldo Marcus Green and starred Will Smith. The film's original score composed by Kris Bowers, released on November 12, 2021, by WaterTower Music, with 18 tracks from the score and an original song "Be Alive" performed by Beyoncé. It was also released as a single on the same date. The song earned Beyoncé, her first Academy Award nomination for Best Original Song at the 94th edition of the ceremony held in March 2022, along with numerous accolades.

== Development ==
For the film's score, Bowers used a prepared piano which was critical to emphasize familial warmth as well as driving it as a percussive vehicle to understand the sport of tennis, as well as how Serena and Venus changed the game. He intended to limit the sound palette in a somewhat literal way with strings and having felt on them, and a prepared piano was used into the score. He used putty, nails, ping-pong balls, clothespins, coins and pieces of paper to enhance the percussive sounds. Even though it diluted the string vibration, the sound resonated with piercing, unique power, which he admitted "In the beginning of the tennis match [in the film], we strip everything down just to prepared piano, so that it feels incredibly tense. And I wanted to create this rhythmic drive, so that the ball hitting felt like it was part of the music and the hits were almost punctuating parts of the score."

The score was recorded during the COVID-19 pandemic, instead of supervising the scoring process at his home studio, Bowers instead preferred to record the picture to big screen, which intended to assemble a large orchestra at Eastwood Scoring Stage in Warner Bros. Studios. Bowers wanted to steer clear of the motifs and themes heard in sporting films, to make the score unique as the film was put together in certain rhythm of mind. Apart from Green's direction, the film's editor Pamela Martin edited the matches to feel what the arc of the game was, resulting the film to be felt innovative. Rhythmically, he wanted the score to feel unpredictable as the game, hence he used several ambient and percussive sounds to immerse the viewers in the climax scenes.

Richard's theme was the first of the cues Bowers scored for, which was a five-note theme. Explaining about the theme, Bowers said "I thought about a chord that could encompass both of those things. That incessant note starts on the first chord and it's already a dissonance; it's already a note that doesn't really fit in that chord but still has a warmth to it." He also admitted that there is a melody in that theme which felt interesting to do variations for all of the themes, during the competition scenes, and serves as an inspiration for Venus' cue, which started soft and timid and later grows and swells with the big orchestral score accompanies it.

== Track listing ==
All tracks are written by Kris Bowers, except where noted.

No.	Title	Writer(s)	Artist	Length
1.	"Family Dinner"			2:00
2.	"The Plan"			3:12
3.	"Unexpected"			2:12
4.	"Hitting"			0:41
5.	"Practice"			2:18
6.	"First Match"			1:44
7.	"Carbon Mesa"			2:58
8.	"That's Our Job"			2:16
9.	"Fired"			1:18
10.	"So You Wanna Play?"			1:00
11.	"Court Day"			1:43
12.	"Stafford"			3:52
13.	"Both Girls"			2:22
14.	"Venus vs. Vicario"			2:30
15.	"First Set"			3:18
16.	"Vicario"			2:02
17.	"Match"			2:05
18.	"Family"			3:09
19.	"Be Alive"	Beyoncé; DIXSON	Beyoncé	3:40
Total length:				44:20

== Reception ==
Filmtracks.com wrote "Bowers achieves his purpose for King Richard and shows significant promise, but the work doesn't convince emotionally and stops well short of standing alongside the more inspirational sports scores of history." Monica Castillo of TheWrap wrote "Composer Kris Bowers' score is similarly rich and glowing, swelling the music just as Richard and the girls get their hard-won victories and touching moments." Chris Tilly of IGN wrote "Kris Bowers' music pays homage to Jerry Goldsmith's Rocky score".

== Accolades ==
Award	Date of ceremony	Category	Recipient(s)	Result	Ref.
Academy Awards	March 27, 2022	Best Original Song	DIXSON and Beyoncé Knowles-Carter for "Be Alive"	Nominated	
Black Reel Awards	February 27, 2022	Outstanding Original Song	"Be Alive" (Beyoncé and DIXSON)	Nominated	
Critics' Choice Movie Awards	March 13, 2022	Best Song	"Be Alive"	Nominated	
Gold Derby Film Awards	February 27, 2022	Best Original Song	"Be Alive" (Beyoncé and DIXSON)	Nominated	
Golden Globe Awards	January 9, 2022	Best Original Song	"Be Alive" (Beyoncé and DIXSON)	Nominated	
Hollywood Critics Association Awards	February 28, 2022	Best Original Song	"Be Alive" (Beyoncé and DIXSON)	Won	
Hollywood Music in Media Awards	November 17, 2021	Best Original Score in a Feature Film	Kris Bowers	Nominated	
Hollywood Music in Media Awards	November 17, 2021	Best Original Song in a Feature Film	"Be Alive" (Beyoncé and DIXSON)	Nominated	
Houston Film Critics Society	February 19, 2022	Best Picture	King Richard	Nominated	
Houston Film Critics Society	February 19, 2022	Best Actor	Will Smith	Nominated	
Houston Film Critics Society	February 19, 2022	Best Supporting Actress	Aunjanue Ellis	Nominated	
NAACP Image Awards	February 26, 2022	Outstanding Soul/R&B Song	"Be Alive" (Beyoncé and DIXSON)	Nominated	
Satellite Awards	April 2, 2022	Best Original Song	"Be Alive" (Beyoncé and DIXSON)	Nominated	

== Credits ==
Album credits

- Music – Kris Bowers
- Additional music – Michael Dean Parsons
- Producer – Kris Bowers, Max Wrightson
- Orchestration – Edward Trybek, Henri Wilkinson, Jonathan Beard
- Conductor – Fabrizio Mancinelli
- Programming – Kris Bowers, Brian Bender
- Recording – Alan Meyerson
- Mixing – Steve Kaye
- Mastering – Gavin Lurssen, Reuben Cohen
- Score editor – Jason Ruder
- Pro-tools operator – John Traunwieser
- Music co-ordinator – Khamani Hagood, Pierre Charles
- Score co-ordinator – Jasper Randall, Peter Rotter
- Music preparation – Jordan Cox
- Music business and legal affairs – Ari Taitz
- Executive in charge of music (WaterTower Music) – Jason Linn
- Executive in charge of music (Warner Bros. Pictures) – Darren Higman, Paul Broucek
- Soundtrack co-ordinator (Warner Bros. Pictures) – Kari Miazek
- Production manager (WaterTower Music) – Sandeep Sriram

Performer credits

- Bass – BJ Johnson, Stephen Pfeifer, Thomas Harte, Geoffrey Osika
- Cello – Caleb Jones, Eric Byers, Giovanna Clayton, Hillary Smith, Steve Erdody, Vanessa Freebairn-Smith, Jacob Braun
- Harp – Lara Somogyi
- Orchestra – The Hollywood Studio Symphony
- Percussion – Abraham Rounds
- Piano – Seoyon MacDonald
- Viola – Alma Fernandez, David Walther, Jerome Gordon, Zach Dellinger, Linnea Powell, Luke Maurer, Lynne Richburg, Meredith Crawford, Michael Larco, Robert Brophy, Shawn Mann, Andrew Duckles
- Violin – Amy Hershberger, Ana Landauer, Bruce Dukov, Charlie Bisharat, Eun-Mee Ahn, Helen Nightengale, Jacqueline Brand, Jessica Guideri, Josefina Vergara, Kevin Kumar, Lorand Lokuszta, Luanne Homzy, Max Karmazyn, Maya Magub, Natalie Leggett, Phillip Levy, Rhea Fowler, Roberto Cani, Sara Parkins, Sarah Thornblade, Shalini Vijayan, Stephanie Matthews, Tamara Hatwan, Tereza Stanislav, Wynton Grant, Benjamin Jacobson
- Concertmaster – Alyssa Park
