= List of Beyoncé live performances =

Beyonce performances

Beyoncé live performances
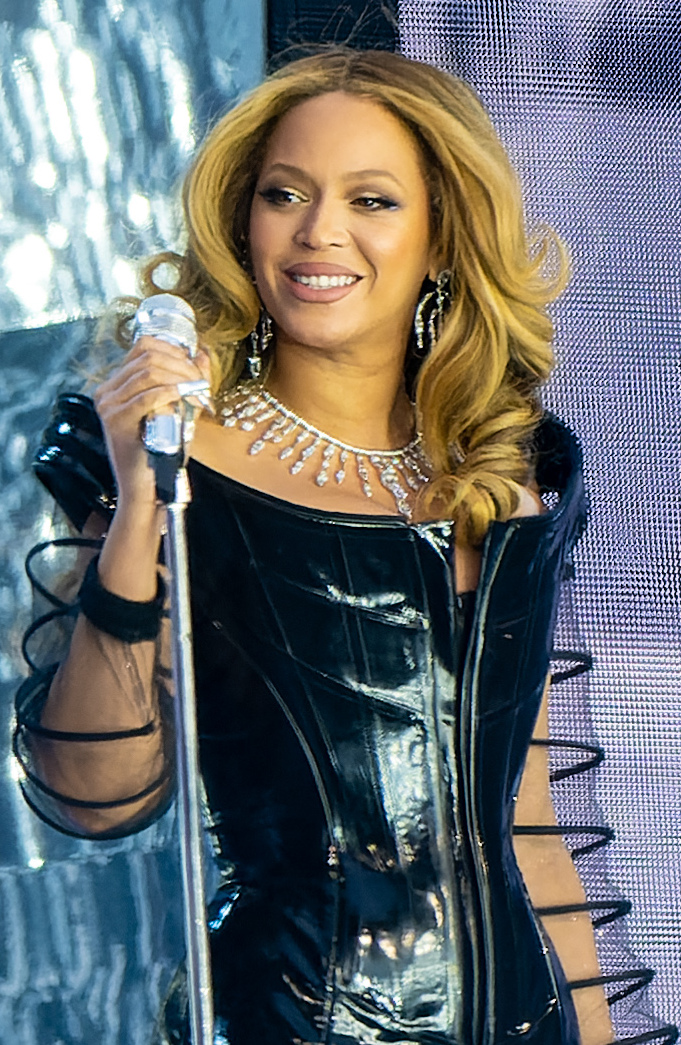
- Beyoncé on the Renaissance World Tour at Tottenham Hotspur Stadium in London on June 1, 2023
- Concert tours: 10
- Concert residencies: 3
- Promotional concerts: 6
- Music festivals: 19
- Award shows: 46
- Sporting events: 8
- Television shows: 87
- Other performances: 36
- Guest appearances: 20

American singer and songwriter Beyoncé has embarked on 10 solo concert tours. (Note: The tours and performances by Beyoncé as part of the group Destiny's Child are not included.) She is the first woman and first American artist to gross over $400 million on two separate tours. According to Billboard, she is the highest-grossing Black artist and the highest-grossing R&B artist. Pollstar honored her as the Touring Artist of the Decade in 2021. As of 2025, Beyoncé has grossed $2 billion from her shows from 13.7 million tickets.

Beyoncé's first solo tour was the Dangerously in Love Tour (2003), which mostly took place in the UK. She embarked on her first major solo world tour, the Beyoncé Experience (2007), following Destiny's Child's disbandment in 2005. Her third concert tour, the I Am... World Tour (2009–2010), marked the first time Beyoncé performed in South America. The Mrs. Carter Show World Tour (2013–2014) was her first to gross over $200 million. With total revenue of $229.7 million, it was the highest-grossing female tour and highest-grossing solo tour of 2013.

In 2016, Beyoncé became the first woman to headline an all-stadium tour with the Formation World Tour. The highest-grossing female tour of the year, it grossed $260 million; it was named Tour of the Year at the American Music Awards, Top R&B Tour at the Billboard Music Awards, and Tour of the Decade (2010s) by Consequence of Sound. The Renaissance World Tour (2023) became the highest-grossing tour of all time by a Black artist, accumulating $579.8 million from 2.77 million tickets sold in 56 shows; it was named R&B Tour of the Year at both the Billboard & Pollstar Awards. The Cowboy Carter Tour (2025) grossed $407 million to become the highest-grossing country music tour of all time.

Besides solo tours, Beyoncé has embarked on three co-headlining tours. In 2004, she co-headlined the Verizon Ladies First Tour with Alicia Keys and Missy Elliott. Ten years later, she co-headlined the On the Run Tour with her husband, rapper Jay-Z. The all-stadium tour grossed $109.7 million. In 2018, Beyoncé and Jay-Z embarked on their second collaborative tour, the On The Run II Tour. It grossed $253.5 million, making it the third-highest-grossing tour of 2018. The tour was named the Best Hip-Hop/R&B Tour at the 2019 Pollstar Awards, and Top Rap Tour and Top R&B Tour at the 2019 Billboard Music Awards.

Beyoncé has also held concert residencies, including I Am... Yours (2009), 4 Intimate Nights with Beyoncé (2011), and Revel Presents: Beyoncé Live (2012). She has headlined several notable festivals. In 2011, she became the first solo Black female artist to headline the Pyramid Stage at the Glastonbury Festival. Her headlining set at the Super Bowl XLVII halftime show (2013) ranks among the most-watched halftime shows in history, generating 110.8 million viewers. In 2016, she featured as a special guest during Coldplay's performance at the Super Bowl 50 halftime show. Her performance at the 59th Annual Grammy Awards (2017) is the most-searched Grammy performance on Google in the US. In 2018, she became the first Black woman to headline Coachella. Paying tribute to historically Black colleges and universities, it has been dubbed "Beychella" and is the most-searched performance in Google's history.

== Concert tours ==
=== Headlining ===
List of headlining concert tours, showing dates, associated album, and relevant data
Title	Date	Associated album	Countries/Territories	Shows	Attendance	Gross	Adjusted gross (in 2025 dollar)	Ref.
Dangerously in Love Tour	November 3, 2003 – November 19, 2003	Dangerously in Love	England; Scotland; Ireland; Northern Ireland; Netherlands	10	—N/a	—N/a	—N/a	
The Beyoncé Experience	April 10, 2007 – December 30, 2007	B'Day	Japan; Australia; Germany; Sweden; Norway; Denmark; Austria; Switzerland; Italy; France; Netherlands; Belgium; Portugal; Spain; England; Wales; Ireland; United States; Mexico; Canada; Russia; Ethiopia; Romania; India; Thailand; Indonesia; Macau; China; Philippines; South Korea; Taiwan	96	272,521	$24,900,000	$38,662,735	
I Am... Tour	March 26, 2009 – February 18, 2010	I Am... Sasha Fierce	Canada; United States; Croatia; Austria; Hungary; Czech Republic; Netherlands; France; Belgium; Denmark; Germany; Sweden; Switzerland; Portugal; Spain; England; Northern Ireland; Ireland; Japan; Ukraine; Australia; Singapore; South Korea; China; United Arab Emirates; Russia; Egypt; Greece; Brazil; Argentina; Chile; Peru; Trinidad and Tobago	108	980,715	$113,646,156	$167,789,800	
The Mrs. Carter Show World Tour	April 15, 2013 – March 27, 2014	Beyoncé	Serbia; Croatia; Slovakia; Netherlands; France; England; Ireland; Belgium; Italy; Switzerland; Germany; Poland; Denmark; Norway; Sweden; United States; Canada; Brazil; Venezuela; Colombia; Mexico; Puerto Rico; New Zealand; Australia; Scotland; Spain; Portugal	132	1,928,590	$221,989,791	$301,904,868	
The Formation World Tour	April 27, 2016 – October 7, 2016	Lemonade	United States; Canada; England; Wales; Scotland; Ireland; Germany; Switzerland; Netherlands; Italy; France; Denmark; Sweden; Belgium; Spain	49	2,242,099	$256,084,556	$343,541,054	
Renaissance World Tour	May 10, 2023 – October 1, 2023	Renaissance	Sweden; Belgium; Wales; Scotland; England; France; Spain; Germany; Netherlands; Poland; Canada; United States	56	2,756,507	$579,813,546	$612,679,779	
Cowboy Carter Tour	April 28, 2025 – July 26, 2025	Cowboy Carter	United States; England; France	32	1,596,165	$407,600,112	—N/a	

=== Co-headlining ===
List of co-headlining tours, showing co-headliners, dates, and relevant data
Title	Co-headliner(s)	Date	Associated album(s)	Countries/Territories	Shows	Attendance	Gross	Adjusted gross (in 2025 dollar)	Ref.
Verizon Ladies First Tour	Alicia Keys; Missy Elliott	March 12, 2004 – April 21, 2004	Dangerously in Love; The Diary of Alicia Keys; This Is Not a Test!	United States	30	280,865	$19,177,889	$32,689,584	
On the Run Tour	Jay-Z	June 25, 2014 – September 13, 2014	Beyoncé; Magna Carta Holy Grail	United States; Canada; France	21	979,781	$109,610,198	$149,069,253	
On the Run II Tour	Jay-Z	June 6, 2018 – October 4, 2018	Everything Is Love	Wales; Scotland; England; Netherlands; Denmark; Sweden; Germany; Poland; Italy; Spain; France; United States; Canada	48	2,177,049	$254,037,862	$325,711,147	

== Concert residencies ==
List of concert residencies, showing dates, venues, and relevant data
Title	Date	Venue	City	Shows	Ref.
I Am... Yours	July 30, 2009 – August 2, 2009	Encore at Wynn	Paradise, Nevada	4	
4 Intimate Nights with Beyoncé	August 14, 2011 – August 19, 2011	Roseland Ballroom	New York City, New York	4	
Revel Presents: Beyoncé Live	May 25, 2012 – May 28, 2012	Revel Casino Hotel Atlantic City	Atlantic City, New Jersey	4	

== Promotional concerts ==
Date	Event	Venue	City	Country	Performed song(s)	Ref.
June 14, 2003	Ford Presents Beyoncé Knowles, Friends & Family, Live From Ford's 100th Anniversary Celebration	Henry Ford II World Center	Dearborn	United States	"Naughty Girl"; "Work It Out"; "Baby Boy"; "Sexy Lil Thug"; "Speechless"; "'03 Bonnie & Clyde"; "Crazy in Love"; "Dangerously in Love 2"	
September 4, 2006	Happy B'Day Party	Nippon Budokan	Tokyo	Japan	"Déjà Vu"; "Say My Name"; "Independent Women"; "Bootylicious"; "Survivor"; "Irreplaceable"; "Ring the Alarm"; "Crazy in Love"	
June 20, 2011	4 Promotional concert	Palais Nikaïa	Nice	France	"Crazy in Love"; "Single Ladies (Put a Ring on It)"; "Naughty Girl"; "Baby Boy"; "If I Were a Boy" / "You Oughta Know"; "Sweet Dreams" / "Sweet Dreams (Are Made of This)"; "Why Don't You Love Me"; "Bohemian Rhapsody"; "The Beautiful Ones"; "Sex on Fire"; "1+1"; "Irreplaceable"; "Best Thing I Never Had"; "Independent Women"; "Bootylicious"; "Bug a Boo"; "Telephone"; "Beautiful Liar"; "Say My Name"; "Jumpin', Jumpin'"; "Survivor"; "At Last"; "Run the World (Girls)"; "End of Time"; "Halo"	
June 22, 2011	4 Promotional concert	Zénith de Lille	Lille	France	"Crazy in Love"; "Single Ladies (Put a Ring on It)"; "Naughty Girl"; "Baby Boy"; "If I Were a Boy" / "You Oughta Know"; "Sweet Dreams" / "Sweet Dreams (Are Made of This)"; "Why Don't You Love Me"; "The Beautiful Ones"; "Sex on Fire"; "1+1"; "Irreplaceable"; "Best Thing I Never Had"; "Independent Women"; "Bootylicious"; "Bug a Boo"; "Telephone"; "Say My Name"; "Jumpin', Jumpin'"; "Survivor"; "At Last"; "Run the World (Girls)"; "End of Time"; "Halo"	
June 23, 2011	4 Promotional concert	Galaxie Amnéville	Amnéville	France	"Crazy in Love"; "Single Ladies (Put a Ring on It)"; "Naughty Girl"; "Baby Boy"; "If I Were a Boy" / "You Oughta Know"; "Sweet Dreams" / "Sweet Dreams (Are Made of This)"; "Why Don't You Love Me"; "The Beautiful Ones"; "Sex on Fire"; "1+1"; "Irreplaceable"; "Best Thing I Never Had"; "Independent Women"; "Bootylicious"; "Bug a Boo"; "Telephone"; "Say My Name"; "Jumpin', Jumpin'"; "Survivor"; "At Last"; "Run the World (Girls)"; "End of Time"; "Halo"	
June 27, 2011	4 Promotional concert	Shepherd's Bush Empire	London	England	"Run the World (Girls)"; "Best Thing I Never Had"; "Irreplaceable"; "End of Time"; "Bohemian Rhapsody"; "The Beautiful Ones"; "Sex on Fire"; "Work It Out"; "Listen"; "Single Ladies (Put a Ring on It)"; "Halo"	

== Music festivals ==
List of festival performances, showing festival names, locations, and set lists
Date	Event	City/Town	Country	Performed song(s)	Ref.
July 6, 2003	Party in the Park	London	England	"Baby Boy"; "Work It Out"; "Dangerously in Love 2"; "Crazy in Love"	
November 29, 2003	46664	Cape Town	South Africa	"Baby Boy"; "Crazy in Love"; "Dangerously in Love 2"; "American Prayer" (with Bono, The Edge and Dave Stewart); "Amandla" (with Queen, Bono, Anastacia, Dave Stewart, Andrews Bonsu and Youssou N'Dour)	
December 5, 2003	KIIS-FM Jingle Ball	Los Angeles	United States	"Crazy in Love"; "Naughty Girl"; "Silent Night"; "Survivor"; "Say My Name"; "Independent Women"; "Me Myself and I"; "Baby Boy" (with Sean Paul)	
December 11, 2003	Z100 Jingle Ball	New York City	United States	"Crazy in Love" (with Jay-Z); "Naughty Girl"; "Silent Night"; "Survivor"; "Say My Name"; "Independent Women"; "Me Myself and I"; "Baby Boy"	
December 19, 2003	WGCI-FM Big Jam	Chicago	United States	"Crazy in Love" (with Jay-Z); "Naughty Girl"; "Silent Night"; "Survivor"; "Say My Name"; "Independent Women"; "Me Myself and I"; "Baby Boy"	
May 8, 2004	The Prince's Trust Urban Music Festival	London	England	"Baby Boy"; "Naughty Girl"; "Crazy in Love" (with Jay-Z)	
October 7, 2006	This Day Music Festival	Lagos	Nigeria	"Déjà Vu"; "Arise, O Compatriots"; "Irreplaceable"	
November 12, 2006	BBC Radio 1 The Chart Show Live	Brighton	England	"Déjà Vu"; "Baby Boy"; "Naughty Girl"; "Irreplaceable"; "Dangerously in Love 2"; "Crazy in Love"	
October 2, 2008	Bermuda Music Festival	Hamilton	Bermuda	"Crazy in Love" / "Crazy"; "Baby Boy" / "Murder She Wrote"; "Beautiful Liar"; "Me, Myself and I"; "Dangerously in Love 2" / "He Loves Me"; "Flaws and All"; "At Last"; "Independent Women Part 1"; "Bootylicious"; "Cater 2 U"; "Say My Name"; "Check on It"; "Déjà Vu" / "On the Island"; "Get Me Bodied"; "Irreplaceable"	
June 26, 2011	Glastonbury Festival	Pilton	England	"Crazy in Love"; "Single Ladies (Put a Ring on It)"; "Naughty Girl"; "Baby Boy" (with Tricky); "Best Thing I Never Had"; "End of Time"; "If I Were a Boy" / "You Oughta Know"; "Sweet Dreams" / "Sweet Dreams (Are Made of This)"; "Why Don't You Love Me"; "The Beautiful Ones"; "Sex on Fire"; "1+1"; "Irreplaceable"; "Independent Women"; "Bootylicious"; "Bug a Boo"; "Telephone"; "Say My Name"; "Jumpin', Jumpin'"; "Survivor"; "At Last"; "Run the World (Girls)"; "Halo"	
July 9, 2011	T in the Park	Kinross	Scotland	"Crazy in Love"; "Single Ladies (Put a Ring on It)"; "Naughty Girl"; "Baby Boy"; "The Beautiful Ones"; "Sex on Fire"; "Best Thing I Never Had"; "1+1"; "Irreplaceable"; "Independent Women"; "Bootylicious"; "Bug a Boo"; "Telephone"; "Say My Name"; "Jumpin', Jumpin'"; "Survivor"; "At Last"; "Halo"	
July 10, 2011	Oxegen	County Kildare	Ireland	"Crazy in Love"; "Single Ladies (Put a Ring on It)"; "Naughty Girl"; "Baby Boy"; "Best Thing I Never Had"; "1+1"; "Irreplaceable"; "Independent Women"; "Bootylicious"; "Bug a Boo"; "Telephone"; "Say My Name"; "Jumpin', Jumpin'"; "Survivor"; "Run the World (Girls)"; "Halo"	
September 5, 2015	Made in America Festival	Philadelphia	United States	"Crazy in Love"; "I Care"; "7/11"; "Diva"; "Survivor"; "Ring the Alarm"; "Run the World (Girls)"; "Bow Down"; "Flawless"; "Say My Name"; "Yoncé"; "Jumpin', Jumpin'"; "Independent Women"; "Drunk in Love"; "Feeling Myself"; "Partition"; "Haunted"; "Blow"; "XO"; "Halo"; "1+1"; "Love On Top"; "End of Time"; "Single Ladies (Put a Ring on It)"	
September 26, 2015	Global Citizen Festival	New York City	United States	"Crazy in Love"; "Love On Top"; "XO"; "Halo"; "1+1"; "Drunk in Love" (with Ed Sheeran); "7/11"; "Diva"; "Survivor"; "Ring the Alarm"; "Run the World (Girls)"; "Flawless"; "Feeling Myself"; "Yoncé"; "Jumpin', Jumpin'"; "End of Time"; "Single Ladies (Put a Ring on It)"	
October 20, 2015	Tidal X: 1020	New York City	United States	"Feeling Myself" (with Nicki Minaj); "Holy Grail" (with Jay-Z)	
October 15, 2016	Tidal X: 1015	New York City	United States	"6 Inch"; "Haunted"; "All Night"	
April 14, 2018	Coachella	Indio	United States	"Crazy in Love"; "Freedom"; "Lift Every Voice and Sing"; "Formation"; "Sorry"; "Kitty Kat"; "Bow Down"; "I Been On"; "Drunk in Love"; "Diva"; "Flawless" / "Feeling Myself"; "Top Off"; "7/11"; "Don't Hurt Yourself"; "I Care"; "Partition"; "Yoncé"; "Mi Gente (Remix)" (with J Balvin) (April 21); "Baby Boy"; "You Don't Love Me (No, No, No)"; "Hold Up"; "Countdown"; "Check on It"; "Déjà Vu" (with Jay-Z); "Run the World (Girls)"; "Lose My Breath" / "Say My Name" / "Soldier" (with Kelly Rowland and Michelle Williams); "Get Me Bodied"; "Single Ladies (Put a Ring on It)"; "Love On Top"	
April 21, 2018	Coachella	Indio	United States		
December 2, 2018	Global Citizen Festival: Mandela 100 (with Jay-Z)	Johannesburg	South Africa	"Holy Grail"; "Part II (On the Run)"; "'03 Bonnie & Clyde"; "Apeshit"; "Nice" (with Pharrell Williams); "La-La-La"; "I Just Wanna Love U (Give It 2 Me)" (with Pharrell Williams); "Drunk in Love"; "Empire State of Mind"; "XO"; "Perfect Duet" (with Ed Sheeran); "Ave Maria (Schubert)"; "Halo" (with Mzansi Youth Choir); "No Church in the Wild"; "Niggas in Paris"; "Beach Is Better"; "Formation"; "Run the World (Girls)"; "Public Service Announcement"; "The Story of O.J."; "713"; "Déjà Vu"; "Show Me What You Got"; "Crazy in Love"; "Freedom"; "Young Forever"	

== Award shows ==
List of award shows performances, showing event names, locations, and performed songs
Date	Event	City	Country	Performed song(s)	Ref.
June 6, 2003	2003 Essence Awards	Los Angeles	United States	"Crazy in Love"	
June 12, 2003	2003 AFI Life Achievement Award	Los Angeles	United States	"Theme from New York, New York"	
June 24, 2003	2003 BET Awards	Los Angeles	United States	"Crazy in Love" (with Jay-Z)	
August 28, 2003	2003 MTV Video Music Awards	New York City	United States	"Baby Boy"; "Crazy in Love" (with Jay-Z)	
October 27, 2003	2003 Radio Music Awards	Las Vegas	United States	"Baby Boy"	
November 6, 2003	2003 MTV Europe Music Awards	Edinburgh	Scotland	"Baby Boy"	
December 10, 2003	2003 Billboard Music Awards	Las Vegas	United States	"Me, Myself and I"	
January 24, 2004	2004 NRJ Music Awards	Cannes	France	"Baby Boy"; "Crazy in Love"	
February 8, 2004	46th Annual Grammy Awards	Los Angeles	United States	"Purple Rain" / "Baby I'm a Star" / "Crazy in Love" / "Let's Go Crazy" (with Prince)	
February 8, 2004	46th Annual Grammy Awards	Los Angeles	United States	"Dangerously in Love 2"	
February 17, 2004	2004 BRIT Awards	London	England	"Crazy in Love"	
February 27, 2005	77th Academy Awards	Los Angeles	United States	"Look to Your Path"; "Learn to Be Lonely"; "Believe" (with Josh Groban)	
December 4, 2005	28th Kennedy Center Honors	Washington, D.C.	United States	"Proud Mary"	
June 27, 2006	2006 BET Awards	Los Angeles	United States	"Déjà Vu" (with Jay-Z)	
August 31, 2006	2006 MTV Video Music Awards	New York City	United States	"Ring the Alarm"	
November 15, 2006	2006 World Music Awards	London	England	"Ring the Alarm"; "Déjà Vu"; "Irreplaceable"	
November 21, 2006	2006 American Music Awards	Los Angeles	United States	"Irreplaceable"	
February 11, 2007	49th Annual Grammy Awards	Los Angeles	United States	"Listen"	
February 25, 2007	79th Academy Awards	Los Angeles	United States	"Love You I Do" (with Jennifer Hudson); "Listen" (with Jennifer Hudson); "Patience" (with Anika Noni Rose, Keith Robinson and Jennifer Hudson)	
June 27, 2007	2007 BET Awards	Los Angeles	United States	"Get Me Bodied" (with Mo'Nique); "Like This" (with Kelly Rowland, Eve, Michelle Williams and Solange Knowles)	
November 18, 2007	2007 American Music Awards	Los Angeles	United States	"Irreplaceable" (with Sugarland)	
February 10, 2008	50th Annual Grammy Awards	Los Angeles	United States	"Proud Mary" (with Tina Turner)	
November 6, 2008	2008 MTV Europe Music Awards	Liverpool	England	"If I Were a Boy"	
November 9, 2008	2008 World Music Awards	Monte Carlo	Monaco	"If I Were a Boy"; "Single Ladies (Put a Ring on It)"	
November 23, 2008	2008 American Music Awards	Los Angeles	United States	"Single Ladies (Put a Ring on It)"	
December 7, 2008	31st Kennedy Center Honors	Washington, D.C.	United States	"The Way We Were"	
December 12, 2008	3rd Premios 40 Principales	Madrid	Spain	"If I Were a Boy"	
February 12, 2009	40th NAACP Image Awards	Los Angeles	United States	"Halo"	
February 22, 2009	81st Academy Awards	Los Angeles	United States	Baz Luhrmann complied medley (with Hugh Jackman, Zac Efron, Vanessa Hudgens, Amanda Seyfried, Dominic Cooper and Spirit of Troy)	
June 28, 2009	2009 BET Awards	Los Angeles	United States	"Ave Maria"; "Angel"; "Ave Maria (Schubert)"	
September 13, 2009	2009 MTV Video Music Awards	New York City	United States	"Sweet Dreams"; "Single Ladies (Put a Ring on It)"	
November 5, 2009	2009 MTV Europe Music Awards	Berlin	Germany	"Sweet Dreams"	
January 31, 2010	52nd Annual Grammy Awards	Los Angeles	United States	"If I Were a Boy"; "You Oughta Know"	
May 22, 2011	2011 Billboard Music Awards	Las Vegas	United States	"Run the World (Girls)"	
June 26, 2011 (Note: The performance was pre-taped during Beyoncé's performance at Glastonbury Festival 2011 on the same day.)	2011 BET Awards	Los Angeles	United States	"Best Thing I Never Had"; "End of Time"	
August 28, 2011	2011 MTV Video Music Awards	Los Angeles	United States	"Love On Top"	
January 26, 2014	56th Annual Grammy Awards	Los Angeles	United States	"Drunk in Love" (with Jay-Z)	
February 19, 2014	2014 BRIT Awards	London	England	"XO"	
June 29, 2014 (Note: The performance was pre-taped during Beyoncé and Jay-Z's performance at Hard Rock Stadium, during their On the Run Tour on June 25, 2014.)	2014 BET Awards	Los Angeles	United States	"Partition" (with Jay-Z)	
August 24, 2014	2014 MTV Video Music Awards	Inglewood	United States	"Mine"; "Haunted" / "Ghost" / "Pretty Hurts"; "No Angel"; "Jealous"; "Blow"; "Drunk in Love"; "Rocket"; "Partition"; "Flawless" / "Superpower"; "Yoncé"; "Blue" / "Heaven"; "XO"	
February 8, 2015	57th Annual Grammy Awards	Los Angeles	United States	"Take My Hand, Precious Lord"	
March 28, 2015	2015 Stellar Awards	Las Vegas	United States	"Alpha and Omega" (intro); "Say Yes" (with Michelle Williams and Kelly Rowland)	
June 26, 2016	2016 BET Awards	Los Angeles	United States	"Freedom" (with Kendrick Lamar)	
August 28, 2016	2016 MTV Video Music Awards	New York City	United States	"Pray You Catch Me; "Hold Up" / "Countdown"; "Sorry"; "Don't Hurt Yourself"; "Formation"	
November 2, 2016	2016 Country Music Association Awards	Nashville	United States	"Daddy Lessons" (with Dixie Chicks)	
February 12, 2017	59th Annual Grammy Awards	Los Angeles	United States	"Love Drought"; "Sandcastles"	
March 27, 2022	94th Academy Awards	Los Angeles	United States	"Be Alive"	

== Sporting events ==
List of sporting event performances, showing event names, locations, and performed songs
Date	Event	City	Country	Performed song(s)	Ref.
January 26, 2003	Super Bowl XXXVII pregame show	San Diego	United States	"Black Magic Woman" / "Oye Como Va" / "The Game of Love" / "Foo Foo" (with Santana and Michelle Branch)	
February 1, 2004	Super Bowl XXXVIII pregame	Houston	United States	"The Star-Spangled Banner"	
February 15, 2004	2004 NBA All-Star Game halftime show	Los Angeles	United States	"Naughty Girl"; "Crazy in Love"	
March 15, 2007	Houston Livestock Show and Rodeo	Houston	United States	"Crazy in Love" / "Crazy"; "Baby Boy"; "Naughty Girl"; "Me Myself and I"; "Déjà Vu"; "Ring the Alarm"; "Lose My Breath"; "Independent Women Part 1"; "No, No, No (Part 2)"; "Bills, Bills, Bills"; "Check on It" (with Slim Thug and Bun B); "Speechless"; "Dangerously in Love 2"; "Irreplaceable"	
January 31, 2013	Super Bowl XLVII press conference	New Orleans	United States	"The Star-Spangled Banner"	
February 3, 2013	Super Bowl XLVII halftime show	New Orleans	United States	"Love On Top"; "Crazy in Love"; "End of Time"; "Baby Boy"; "Bootylicious" / "Independent Women" / "Single Ladies (Put a Ring on It)" (with Destiny's Child); "Halo"	
February 7, 2016	Super Bowl 50 halftime show	Santa Clara	United States	"Formation"; "Uptown Funk" (with Bruno Mars); "Fix You" / "Up&Up" (with Coldplay and Bruno Mars)	
December 25, 2024	NFL 2024 Christmas Day halftime show	Houston	United States	"16 Carriages"; "Blackbiird" (with Tanner Adell, Brittney Spencer, Tiera Kennedy and Reyna Roberts); "Ya Ya"; "My House"; "Spaghettii" / "Riiverdance"; "Sweet Honey Buckiin'" (with Shaboozey); "Levii's Jeans" (with Post Malone); "Jolene"; "Texas Hold 'Em"	

== Television shows ==
Date	Event	City	Country	Performed song(s)	Ref.
June 15, 2002	CD:UK	London	United Kingdom	"Work It Out"	
July 13, 2002	CD:UK	London	United Kingdom	"Work It Out"	
July 23, 2002	The Tonight Show with Jay Leno	Burbank	United States	"Work It Out"	
July 26, 2002	Top of the Pops	London	United Kingdom	"Work It Out"	
July 26, 2002	106 & Park	New York City	United States	"Work It Out"	
August 13, 2002	Rove Live	Melbourne	Australia	"Work It Out"	
November 2, 2002	Saturday Night Live	New York City	United States	"'03 Bonnie & Clyde" (with Jay-Z)	
November 7, 2002	Total Request Live	New York City	United States	"'03 Bonnie & Clyde" (with Jay-Z)	
November 12, 2002	106 & Park	New York City	United States	"'03 Bonnie & Clyde" (with Jay-Z)	
November 21, 2002	Total Request Live (Spankin' New Music Week)	New York City	United States	"'03 Bonnie & Clyde" (with Jay-Z)	
January 11, 2003	CD:UK	London	England	"'03 Bonnie & Clyde" (with Jay-Z)	
January 31, 2003	Top of the Pops	London	England	"'03 Bonnie & Clyde" (with Jay-Z)	
May 17, 2003	Saturday Night Live	New York City	United States	"Crazy in Love" (with Jay-Z); "Dangerously in Love 2"	
May 22, 2003	VH1 Divas Duets	Las Vegas	United States	"Proud Mary" (with Jewel); "Dangerously in Love 2"; "Signed, Sealed, Delivered I'm Yours" (with Stevie Wonder); "Higher Ground" (with Stevie Wonder, Whitney Houston, Mary J. Blige, Chaka Khan, Jewel, Ashanti and Queen Latifah)	
May 23, 2003	MTV Beach House	New York City	United States	"Crazy in Love"	
June 27, 2003	The Today Show	New York City	United States	"Crazy in Love"; "Baby Boy"	
July 3, 2003	V Graham Norton	London	England	"Crazy in Love"	
July 4, 2003	Top of the Pops	London	England	"Crazy in Love"	
July 4, 2003	Macy's 4th of July Fireworks Spectacular	New York City	United States	"Baby Boy"; "Crazy in Love"	
July 5, 2003	CD:UK	London	England	"Crazy in Love"	
July 8, 2003	The Early Show	New York City	United States	"Crazy in Love"; "Baby Boy"; "Be with You"	
July 9, 2003	The View	New York City	United States	"Crazy in Love"	
July 10, 2003	VIVA Interaktiv	Hürth	Germany	"Crazy in Love"; "Baby Boy"	
July 11, 2003	Star Search	Berlin	Germany	"Crazy in Love"	
July 11, 2003	Top of the Pops	London	England	"Crazy in Love"	
July 17, 2003	Late Show with David Letterman	New York City	United States	"Crazy in Love"	
July 19, 2003	Popworld	London	England	"Crazy in Love"	
July 23, 2003	Pepsi Smash	Los Angeles	United States	"Crazy in Love"; "Baby Boy"; "Naughty Girl"	
July 26, 2003	CD:UK	London	England	"Baby Boy"; "Work It Out"; "Be with You"; "Dangerously in Love 2"; "Naughty Girl"; "Crazy in Love"	
August 1, 2003	Top of the Pops	London	England	"Naughty Girl"	
September 17, 2003	The Tonight Show with Jay Leno	Burbank	United States	"Fever"	
September 19, 2003	The Oprah Winfrey Show	Chicago	United States	"Baby Boy"; "Crazy in Love"	
October 15, 2003	Fashion Rocks	London	England	"Baby Boy"; "Crazy in Love"	
November 8, 2003	Star Academy	Paris	France	"Crazy in Love" (with Sofia Essaïdi); "Baby Boy"	
January 16, 2004	Top of the Pops	London	England	"Me Myself and I"	
September 8, 2004	Fashion Rocks	New York City	United States	"Naughty Girl"	
September 5, 2006	The Ellen DeGeneres Show	New York City	United States	"Déjà Vu"; "Irreplaceable"; "Crazy in Love"	
September 6, 2006	Good Morning America	New York City	United States	"Déjà Vu"; "Irreplaceable"; "Crazy in Love"; "Green Light"	
September 7, 2006	Fashion Rocks	New York City	United States	"Déjà Vu" (with Jay-Z)	
September 11, 2006	The View	New York City	United States	"Ring the Alarm"	
September 15, 2006	The Tyra Banks Show	Los Angeles	United States	"Déjà Vu"	
September 22, 2006	Star Academy	Paris	France	"Déjà Vu"; "Crazy in Love" (with Cynthia Niang)	
September 23, 2006	Ant & Dec's Saturday Night Takeaway	London	England	"Déjà Vu"	
September 30, 2006	Music Fair	Tokyo	Japan	"Déjà Vu"; "Ring the Alarm"	
October 27, 2006	Popworld Special	London	England	"Déjà Vu"; "Ring the Alarm"; "Irreplaceable"; "Crazy in Love"	
November 9, 2006	Total Request Live	New York City	United States	"Irreplaceable"	
November 11, 2006	Strictly Come Dancing	London	England	"Irreplaceable"	
November 13, 2006	Beyoncé at the BBC	London	England	"Déjà Vu"; "Baby Boy"; "Naughty Girl"; "Say My Name"; "Independent Women"; "Bootylicious"; "Survivor"; "Ring the Alarm"; "Irreplaceable"; "Crazy in Love"	
November 20, 2006	The Oprah Winfrey Show	Chicago	United States	"Listen"	
November 29, 2006	Disney Parks Christmas Day Parade	Orlando	United States	"Silent Night"	
December 4, 2006	The Today Show	New York City	United States	"Irreplaceable"; "Listen"	
December 25, 2006	Top of the Pops Christmas Special	London (Note: The performance was pre-taped during Beyoncé at the BBC special on November 13, 2006.)	England	"Déjà Vu"	
January 20, 2007	Wetten, dass..?	Friedrichshafen	Germany	"Listen"	
April 2, 2007	The Today Show	New York City	United States	"Irreplaceable"; "Green Light"	
April 6, 2007	The Early Show	New York City	United States	"Irreplaceable"; "Beautiful Liar"	
April 28, 2007	Bravo Supershow	Düsseldorf	Germany	"Irreplaceable"	
December 2, 2007	Movies Rock	Los Angeles	United States	"Over the Rainbow"	
September 5, 2008	Fashion Rocks	New York City	United States	"At Last"; "Just Stand Up!" (with Carrie Underwood, Rihanna, Miley Cyrus, Nicole Scherzinger, Fergie, Leona Lewis, Keyshia Cole, Natasha Bedingfield, Mary J. Blige, Ciara, Mariah Carey and Ashanti); "Ain't Nothing Like the Real Thing" (with Justin Timberlake)	
October 31, 2008	Music Station	Tokyo	Japan	"If I Were a Boy"	
November 9, 2008	Strictly Come Dancing	London	England	"If I Were a Boy"	
November 13, 2008	The Oprah Winfrey Show	Chicago	United States	"If I Were a Boy"	
November 15, 2008	Saturday Night Live	New York City	United States	"If I Were a Boy"; "Single Ladies (Put a Ring on It)"	
November 16, 2008	Total Request Live (Total Finale Live)	New York City	United States	"If I Were a Boy"; "Single Ladies (Put a Ring on It)"; "Crazy in Love"	
November 18, 2008	106 & Park	New York City	United States	"Single Ladies (Put a Ring on It)"	
November 25, 2008	The Ellen DeGeneres Show	Burbank	United States	"Single Ladies (Put a Ring on It)"; "If I Were a Boy"; "Flaws and All"	
November 26, 2008	The Today Show	New York City	United States	"Crazy in Love"; "If I Were a Boy"; "Single Ladies (Put a Ring on It)"; "At Last"	
November 26, 2008	The Tyra Banks Show	Los Angeles	United States	"If I Were a Boy"; "Single Ladies (Put a Ring on It)"	
December 3, 2008	Christmas in Rockefeller Center	New York City	United States	"Ave Maria"	
December 8, 2008	The Ellen DeGeneres Show	Burbank	United States	"At Last"	
December 12, 2008	Star Academy	Paris	France	"Irreplaceable" (with Alice Raucoules); "If I Were a Boy"	
December 13, 2008	The X Factor	London	England	"Listen" (with Alexandra Burke); "If I Were a Boy"	
April 22, 2009	Late Show with David Letterman	New York City	United States	"Halo"	
April 23, 2009	The Today Show	New York City	United States	"Halo"	
January 22, 2010	Hope for Haiti Now	London	England	"Halo" (with Chris Martin)	
May 17, 2011	Surprise Oprah! A Farewell Spectacular	Chicago	United States	"Run the World (Girls)"	
May 25, 2011	American Idol	Los Angeles	United States	"Crazy in Love" (with American Idol Girls); "1+1"	
June 28, 2011	Le Grand Journal	Paris	France	"Run the World (Girls)"	
June 28, 2011	X Factor	Paris	France	"Best Thing I Never Had"; "Run the World (Girls)"	
July 1, 2011	Good Morning America	New York City	United States	"Run the World (Girls)"; "Single Ladies (Put a Ring on It)"; "1+1"; "Best Thing I Never Had"; "End of Time"	
July 4, 2011	Macy's 4th of July Fireworks Spectacular	New York City	United States	"Best Thing I Never Had"; "Proud to Be an American"	
July 14, 2011 (Note: The television special was broadcast by ITV on December 4, 2011.)	A Night with Beyoncé	London	England	"Crazy in Love"; "Run the World (Girls)"; "At Last"; "I Care"; "I Miss You"; "Irreplaceable"; "End of Time"; "If I Were a Boy" / "You Oughta Know"; "1+1"; "Countdown"; "Best Thing I Never Had"; "Party"; "Single Ladies (Put a Ring on It)"; "I Was Here"; "Halo"	
July 28, 2011	The View	New York City	United States	"1+1"; "Best Thing I Never Had"	
July 28, 2011	Late Night with Jimmy Fallon	New York City	United States	"Best Thing I Never Had" (with The Roots)	
November 11, 2011	Late Night with Jimmy Fallon	New York City	United States	"Countdown" (with The Roots)	
December 31, 2011	Dick Clark's New Year's Rockin' Eve	New York City	United States	"I Was Here"	
February 10, 2015	Stevie Wonder: Songs in the Key of Life — An All-Star Grammy Salute	Los Angeles	United States	"Fingertips"; "Master Blaster (Jammin')" (with Ed Sheeran); "Higher Ground" (with Ed Sheeran and Gary Clark, Jr.)	
April 16, 2020	The Disney Family Singalong	—N/a		"When You Wish Upon a Star"	

== Other performances ==
Date	Event	City	Performed song(s)	Ref.
November 12, 2002	42nd & Vine...Hollywood Hits Broadway gala	New York City	"Somewhere"	
December 13, 2003	Roxy Saturdays	New York City	"Naughty Girl"; "Crazy in Love"	
April 24, 2004	2nd Hollywood Hits Broadway Benefit Gala	New York City	"You'll Never Walk Alone"	
July 10, 2004	The Cantor Foundation Dolce Vita benefit gala	Stowe	Unknown	
October 23, 2004	Carousel of Hope Ball	Beverly Hills	Unknown	
November 1, 2005	Cipriani Wall Street concert series	New York City	"Baby Boy"; "Naughty Girl"; "I Want You Back"; "ABC"	
June 3, 2006	Walmart Shareholders Meeting	Fayetteville, Arkansas	"Say My Name"; "Independent Women"; "Dangerously in Love 2"; "Crazy in Love"	
June 14, 2006	Robin Hood Foundation benefit gala	New York City	"So Amazing"; "A Song for You"; "I'm Coming Out"; "Living for the City"	
August 17, 2006	Radio One 25th Anniversary Gala	Washington, D.C.	"Say My Name"; "Independent Women"; "Survivor"; "Ring the Alarm"; "Déjà Vu"; "Crazy in Love"	
September 15, 2006	Best Buy opening free concert	Toronto	"Déjà Vu"; "Baby Boy"; "Naughty Girl"; "Bug a Boo"; "No, No, No"; "Bootylicious"; "Jumpin', Jumpin'"; "Say My Name"; "Independent Women"; "'03 Bonnie & Clyde"; "Survivor"; "Green Light"; "Ring the Alarm"; "Irreplaceable"; "Crazy in Love"	
September 21, 2006	Emporio Armani Red One Night Only	London	"Déjà Vu"; "Crazy in Love"	
September 29, 2006	Macy's Glamorama	Chicago	Unknown	
October 1, 2008	Empire Entertainment's Private Party	Antibes	"Survivor"; "Déjà Vu"; "Say My Name"; "Crazy in Love"	
November 14, 2008	Live Lounge	London	"If I Were a Boy"; "Irreplaceable"	
November 17, 2008	AOL Sessions	Los Angeles	"At Last"; "Me Myself and I"; "Irreplaceable"; "If I Were a Boy"; "Single Ladies (Put a Ring on It)"	
January 18, 2009	We Are One: The Obama Inaugural Celebration at the Lincoln Memorial	Washington, D.C.	"America the Beautiful"	
January 20, 2009	The Neighborhood Inaugural Ball	Washington, D.C.	"At Last"	
February 10, 2009	Saks Fifth Avenue's Unforgettable Evening	Beverly Hills, California	"At Last"; "Crazy in Love"; "Single Ladies (Put a Ring on It)"	
September 26, 2009	National University Hospital charity performance	Singapore	"Irreplaceable"; "Halo"; "Radio"	
December 31, 2009	New Year's Eve private show	Saint Barthélemy	"Irreplaceable"; "If I Were a Boy"; "Déjà Vu"; "Bootylicious"; "Jumpin', Jumpin'"; "Upgrade U"; "Work It Out"; "Single Ladies (Put a Ring on It)"	
May 19, 2010	State Dinner honoring Felipe Calderón	Washington, D.C.	Unknown	
September 14, 2011	Target managers meeting	Minneapolis	"1+1"	
October 8, 2011	Michael Jackson Tribute Concert	Cardiff	"I Wanna Be Where You Are"	
August 10, 2012	World Humanitarian Day performance at the United Nations	New York City	"I Was Here"	
December 31, 2012	New Year's Eve private show	Las Vegas	"End of Time"; "Get Me Bodied"; "Baby Boy"; "Crazy in Love"; "Diva"; "Party"; "1+1"; "If I Were a Boy" / "Iris"; "Sex on Fire"; "Irreplaceable"; "Jumpin', Jumpin'"; "Run the World (Girls)"; "Why Don't You Love Me"; "Halo"; "Single Ladies (Put a Ring on It)"	
January 20, 2013	Second inauguration of Barack Obama	Washington, D.C.	"The Star-Spangled Banner"	
January 18, 2014	Michelle Obama 50th Birthday celebration	Washington, D.C.	"Single Ladies (Put a Ring on It)"; "Irreplaceable"	
September 30, 2015	Private show at Wynn Las Vegas	Las Vegas	"Crazy in Love"; "7/11"; "Diva"; "Survivor"; "Ring the Alarm"; "Run the World (Girls)"; "Flawless"; "Feeling Myself"; "Yoncé"; "Jumpin', Jumpin'"; "End of Time"; "Single Ladies (Put a Ring on It)"	
March 5, 2016	Center for Early Education 75th Anniversary Gala	West Hollywood	"I Will Always Love You"; "Halo"; "Crazy in Love"; "XO"	
November 4, 2016	Get Out the Vote concert supporting Hillary Clinton 2016 presidential campaign	Cleveland	"Formation"; "Freedom"; "Diva"; "Bow Down"; "Independent Women"; "Run the World (Girls)"; "Holy Grail" (with Jay-Z)	
December 15, 2016	Parkwood Entertainment holiday party	Los Angeles	"All Night"	
October 11, 2018	City of Hope Gala	Santa Monica	"XO"; ""Perfect Duet" version"; "Ave Maria (Schubert)"; "Halo"	
December 9, 2018	Isha Ambani and Anand Piramal wedding party	Udaipur	"Déjà Vu"; "Crazy in Love"; "Freedom"; "Baby Boy"; "Mi Gente (Remix)"; "Formation"; "Run the World (Girls)"; "XO"; ""Perfect Duet" version"; "Drunk in Love"; "Naughty Girl"; "Single Ladies (Put a Ring on It)"	
February 24, 2020	A Celebration of Life: Kobe & Gianna Bryant memorial	Los Angeles	"XO"; "Halo"	
January 21, 2023	Atlantis the Royal Hotel unveiling	Palm Jumeirah, Dubai	“At Last” ⸱ “XO” ⸱ “Flaws and All” ⸱ “Halo” ⸱ “Brown Skin Girl” (with Blue Ivy Carter) ⸱ “Be Alive” ⸱ “Spirit of Rangeela” (performed by Firdhaus Orchestra) ⸱ “Otherside” ⸱ “Bigger” ⸱ “Spirit” ⸱ “Freedom” ⸱ “I Care” ⸱ “Beautiful Liar” ⸱ “Batwanes Beek” (performed by Firdhaus Orchestra) ⸱ “Crazy in Love (Remix)” ⸱ “Crazy in Love” ⸱ “Countdown” ⸱ “Naughty Girl” ⸱ “Drunk in Love”	

== Guest appearances ==
Date	Artist	Event	City	Performed song(s)	Ref.
November 25, 2003	Jay-Z	Madison Square Garden concert	New York City	"Crazy in Love"; "Baby Boy"; "Summertime" (with Ghostface Killah)	
March 5, 2005	Usher	One Night, One Star	San Juan, Puerto Rico	"Bad Girl"	
June 25, 2006	Jay-Z	Reasonable Doubt 10th Anniversary concert	New York City	"Can't Knock the Hustle"	
September 24, 2006	Jay-Z	Water for Life Tour concerts	London	"Crazy in Love"; "Déjà Vu"	
September 27, 2006	Jay-Z	Water for Life Tour concerts	London	"Crazy in Love"; "Déjà Vu"	
May 2, 2008	Jay-Z and Mary J. Blige	Heart of the City Tour concert	New York City	"Crazy in Love"	
October 29, 2008	Jay-Z	Power 105's Powerhouse Concert	East Rutherford, New Jersey	"Single Ladies (Put a Ring on It)"	
January 19, 2009	Jay-Z	An Evening With Jay-Z (Barack Obama tribute concert)	Washington, D.C.	"Single Ladies (Put a Ring on It)"	
September 11, 2009	Jay-Z	Answer the Call	New York City	"Diva"	
March 17, 2010	Alicia Keys	Freedom Tour concert	New York City	"Put It in a Love Song"	
April 16, 2010	Jay-Z	Coachella Valley Music and Arts Festival	Indio, California	"Young Forever"	
September 13, 2010	Jay-Z and Eminem	The Home & Home Tour concerts	New York City	"Young Forever"	
September 14, 2010	Jay-Z and Eminem	The Home & Home Tour concerts	New York City	"Young Forever"	
December 31, 2010	Jay-Z and Coldplay	Cosmopolitan New Year's Eve show	Las Vegas	"Halo" (with Chris Martin); "Young Forever"	
October 6, 2012	Jay-Z	Barclays Center concert	New York City	"Diva"; "Crazy in Love"; "Young Forever"	
February 1, 2014	Jay-Z	DirecTV Super Saturday Night	New York City	"Drunk in Love"	
September 27, 2014	Jay-Z	Global Citizen Festival	New York City	"Holy Grail"; "Young Forever"	
September 26, 2015	Pearl Jam	Global Citizen Festival	New York City	"Redemption Song"	
July 10, 2026	Jay-Z	JAŸ-Z30	New York City	"Can't Knock the Hustle" (with elements of "Love On Top")	
July 12, 2026	Jay-Z	JAŸ-Z30	New York City	"Drunk in Love" (with elements of "Beautiful Liar", "Tom Ford", "Mundian To Bach Ke" and "Partition")	
