= Crazy in Love =

2003 single by Beyoncé featuring Jay-Z

Single by Beyoncé featuring Jay-Z

from the album Dangerously in Love
- B-side: "Summertime"; "My First Time"
- Released: May 18, 2003
- Studio: The Hit Factory (New York City); Sony (New York City)
- Genre: Pop; hip-hop; R&B
- Length: 3:56
- Label: Columbia
- Songwriters: Beyoncé; Rich Harrison; Eugene Record; Shawn Carter
- Producers: Beyoncé; Rich Harrison

Beyoncé singles chronology
"'03 Bonnie & Clyde" (2002)	"Crazy in Love" (2003)	"Baby Boy" (2003)

Jay-Z singles chronology
"La-La-La" (2003)	"Crazy in Love" (2003)	"Frontin'" (2003)

Music video
- "Crazy in Love" on YouTube

"Crazy in Love" is a song by American singer and songwriter Beyoncé featuring rapper Jay-Z. She wrote the song with him and Rich Harrison, and co-produced it with Harrison. It contains a sample of the Chi-Lites's 1970 song "Are You My Woman (Tell Me So)", resulting in the group's Eugene Record receiving a writing credit. "Crazy in Love" is a pop, hip-hop, and R&B track with elements of 1970s soul and funk. It is a love song whose lyrics portray a romantic fixation that leads the narrator to behave unusually. Columbia Records released "Crazy in Love" in the US on May 18, 2003, as the lead single from Beyoncé's debut studio album, Dangerously in Love (2003).

The song charted at number one in Ireland, the United Kingdom, and the United States, while reaching the top five in Australia, Belgium, Canada, Denmark, Greece, Hungary, Italy, the Netherlands, New Zealand, Norway, Romania, Spain, Sweden, and Switzerland. Music critics praised its production, Jay-Z's rap verse, and Beyoncé's vocals, particularly the "uh-oh, uh-oh" hook. At the 46th Annual Grammy Awards, it was nominated for three awards and won two: Best R&B Song and Best Rap/Sung Collaboration. "Crazy in Love" is often regarded as the song that propelled Beyoncé to superstar status, and Rolling Stone placed it at number sixteen on their 2024 revision of the "500 Greatest Songs of All Time".

Jake Nava directed the accompanying music video for "Crazy in Love", which depicts Beyoncé in various dance sequences. It won three awards at the 2003 MTV Video Music Awards, including Best Female Video and Best R&B Video. The song became a staple of the setlists of Beyoncé's concerts and has been performed on all of her headlining concert tours. The American Society of Composers, Authors and Publishers recognized "Crazy in Love" as one of the most performed songs of 2004. It has since been covered and remixed multiple times; Beyoncé re-recorded it for the soundtrack of the erotic romantic drama film Fifty Shades of Grey (2015).

== Development and production ==
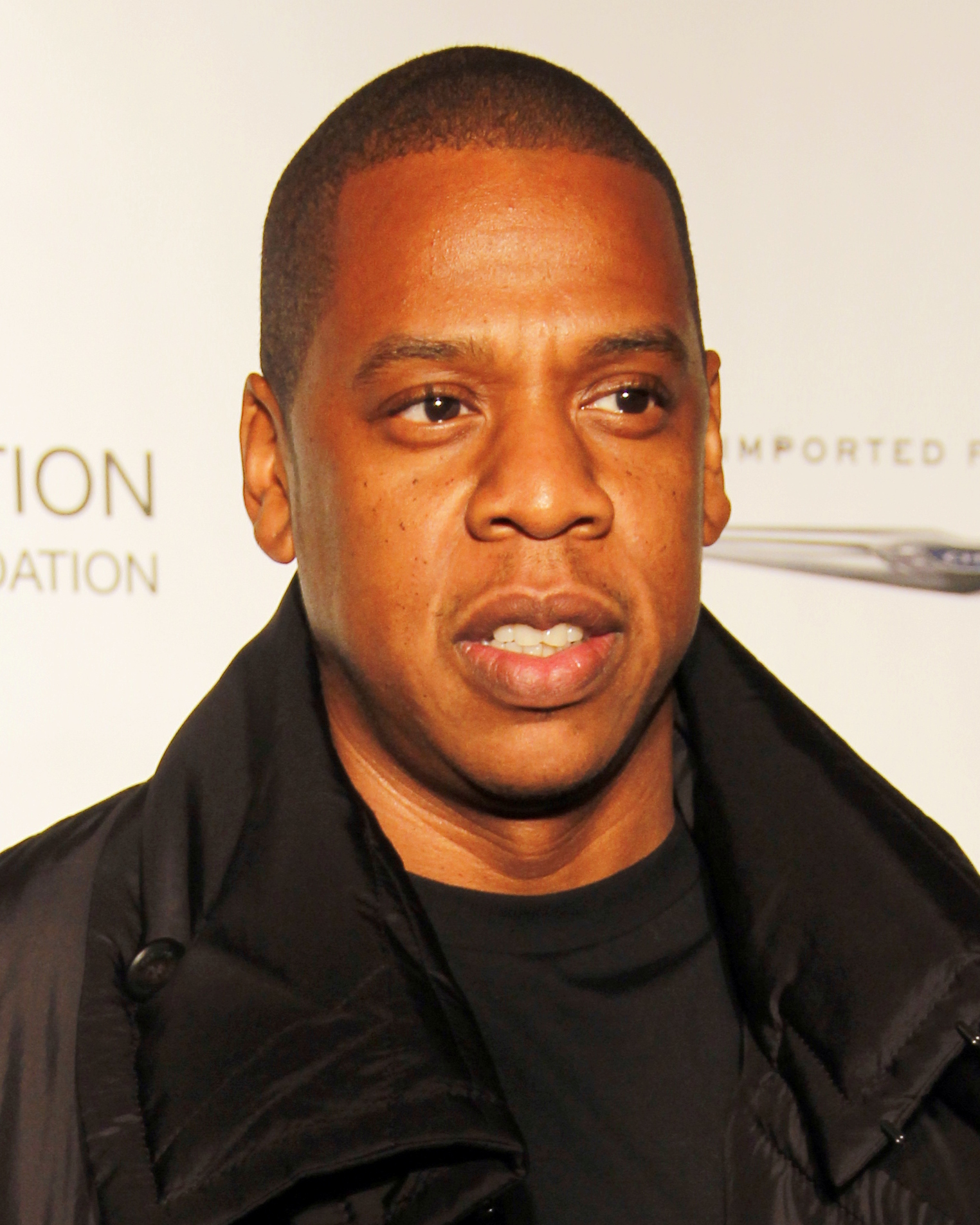
Jay-Z provided vocals on "Crazy in Love".

By July 2002, American singer Beyoncé had recorded several tracks later included on her solo debut studio album, Dangerously in Love. Columbia Records initially scheduled the album for release in October 2002, but postponed it multiple times to take advantage of the success of Nelly's single "Dilemma", featuring Beyoncé's former Destiny's Child bandmate Kelly Rowland. The delays gave Beyoncé more time to record more songs for the album. Before meeting Beyoncé, producer Rich Harrison had already developed the beat for the song. He sampled the instrumental hook from the 1970 track "Are You My Woman? (Tell Me So)", written and composed by Eugene Record, lead singer of the Chicago-based group the Chi-Lites.

When Harrison first shared the beat with friends, their lukewarm response led him to believe it was distinctive and would be better appreciated within a finished track. He chose not to promote the beat widely and preferred to wait for a fitting artist, stating: "People do not really get it and you will leave them with a foul taste in their mouth". Harrison was pleasantly surprised when he received a call from Beyoncé, who was working on Dangerously in Love. However, he following day, he arrived late to the session and was still feeling the effects of a hangover. When Harrison played the sample in the studio, Beyoncé initially questioned its suitability, finding the bold horn-driven sound somewhat old-fashioned for 21st-century music. To Harrison's delight, she decided to use the sample and gave Harrison two hours to develop the song while she left to shop for a birthday gift for Rowland.

Harrison said that writing the lyrics for "Crazy in Love" within two hours was challenging, especially while dealing with a hangover. Nevertheless, he completed the verses and hook in that time and also created a backing track, performing all the instrumental parts himself. The bridge was written by Beyoncé, who drew inspiration from a moment in front of a mirror; dressed casually and with messy hair, she repeated the phrase, "I'm looking so crazy right now". Harrison responded by identifying it as the song's hook, which became the basis for the title. After finishing the middle eight, Beyoncé and Harrison collaborated on the catchphrase, "Uh-oh, uh-oh, you know". Featured artist and rapper Jay-Z joined the project late in the production process. He arrived at the studio around 3 a.m. and recorded his rap verse, improvising it in about ten minutes. The recording of "Crazy in Love" took place about three months after Beyoncé first met with Harrison.

== Music and lyrics ==
"Crazy in Love" (2003)
A sample of the hook in "Crazy in Love" which uses a traditional cowbell rhythm that is often found in samba music.

At three minutes and fifty-six seconds long, "Crazy in Love" is performed in the key of D minor. It is primarily a pop and R&B track with influences of hip-hop, 1970s-style funk, and soul. Music critic Robert Webb of The Independent observed that the song's old soul influences stem primarily from its horn hook, which samples the Chi-Lites track "Are You My Woman? (Tell Me So)" (1970). "Crazy in Love", which Webb described as having a "go-go vibe", is constructed around a hip-hop beat. The Times noted its use of big drums and brass elements. The song has a moderate tempo of around 100 beats per minute in common time. Beyoncé's vocal range spans approximately one and a half octaves, from B♭_{3} to F_{5}. It employs two major chords—B♭ and G, a minor third apart—with one of the main vocal riffs following a traditional cowbell rhythm common in samba music.

According to Natalie Nichols of the Los Angeles Times, the lyrics of "Crazy in Love" depict a state of romantic obsession. Beyoncé has stated that the song describes how falling in love can lead individuals to act out of character and become emotionally open. Rolling Stone wrote that "Crazy in Love" has "such a cauldron of energy" that Beyoncé sounds "loose and sexy," gripped by emotions she "can neither understand nor control." The lyrics follow a conventional verse–chorus structure. Jay-Z opens the song with a short spoken rap introduction: "Yes! So crazy right now. Most incredibly, it's your girl, B. It's your boy, Young." Beyoncé then delivers the first verse and chorus. The recurring "uh-oh, uh-oh" phrase functions as a hook between sections. Jay-Z contributes a second verse-rap later in the song. Before returning to the final chorus, "Crazy in Love" transitions into a bridge, where the lyrics further speak on emotional vulnerability and infatuation: "I'm not myself, lately I'm foolish, I don't do this, / I've been playing myself, baby, I don't care / 'Cuz your love's got the best of me, / And baby, you're making a fool of me, / You got me sprung and I don't care who sees."

== Reception ==
=== Initial ===
"Crazy in Love" was another one of those classic moments in pop culture that none of us expected. I asked Jay to get on the song the night before I had to turn my album in – thank God he did. It still never gets old, no matter how many times I sing it.

— Beyoncé during her Billboard cover story in 2011

"Crazy in Love" was acclaimed by music critics, some of whom deemed it a highlight of Dangerously in Love. Anthony DeCurtis—writing for Rolling Stone—said that the song was anchored by its "propulsive horn sample and the charged presence of her pal, Jay-Z", while Kelefa Sanneh of The New York Times deemed it the best song on the album because of its "simplicity, irresistible combination of triumphant horns and a wicked hip-hop beat". Slant Magazine praised the song's lyrical composition, musical structure—particularly its horns—and Jay-Z's rap performance. The Washington Post also named it the best song on the album and praised its instrumentation, harmonies, and rap verse of Jay-Z. MTV News considered "Crazy in Love" to be the "proudest moment" of Dangerously in Love.

Other critics praised Beyoncé's voice and lyrics on "Crazy in Love". Sanneh liked her "deft and accurate" vocals, but opined that they do not convey "the giddy rush that the lyrics describe". PopMatters's Mark Anthony Neal called the "uh-oh, uh-oh" hook catchy, and Slant described it as "so hot that it's permanently branded 'diva' to the singer's resume". Rob Fitzpatrick, writing for NME, called Beyoncé's vocals on "Crazy in Love" "genuinely, hip-grindingly fruity". Los Angeles Times writer Natalie Nichols stated that "sexy dance tunes as the vintage funk-flavored 'Crazy in Love'" made Dangerously in Love a great album. For Entertainment Weekly, Neil Drumming wrote that the album's weaker latter half underscores how "fresh" the opening track, "Crazy in Love", sounds by comparison. IGN wrote that Beyoncé moves through the song's "infectious rhythm" with poise and a seductive mid-range delivery.

Ben Ratliff, in his review of Dangerously in Love at the magazine Blender, named "Crazy in Love" one of the few tracks on the album that was "itchy [and] eager-to-please". Fitzpatrick called the song a "head-nodding [and] body-rocking funk-soul genius" and wrote that it is "a 100 per cent, stone-cold, dead-cert classic". IGN said that the track gains momentum when Jay-Z introduces his distinctive uptown style, saying that while many rap–R&B collaborations fall short, this one succeeds due to the effective interplay between their vocals. The Times's Lisa Verrico commented that Jay-Z delivers a "decent rap", but ultimately it is Beyoncé and the production that "save the day", also observing that "Crazy in Love" marked a stylistic departure for her from her work with Destiny's Child.

=== Retrospective ===
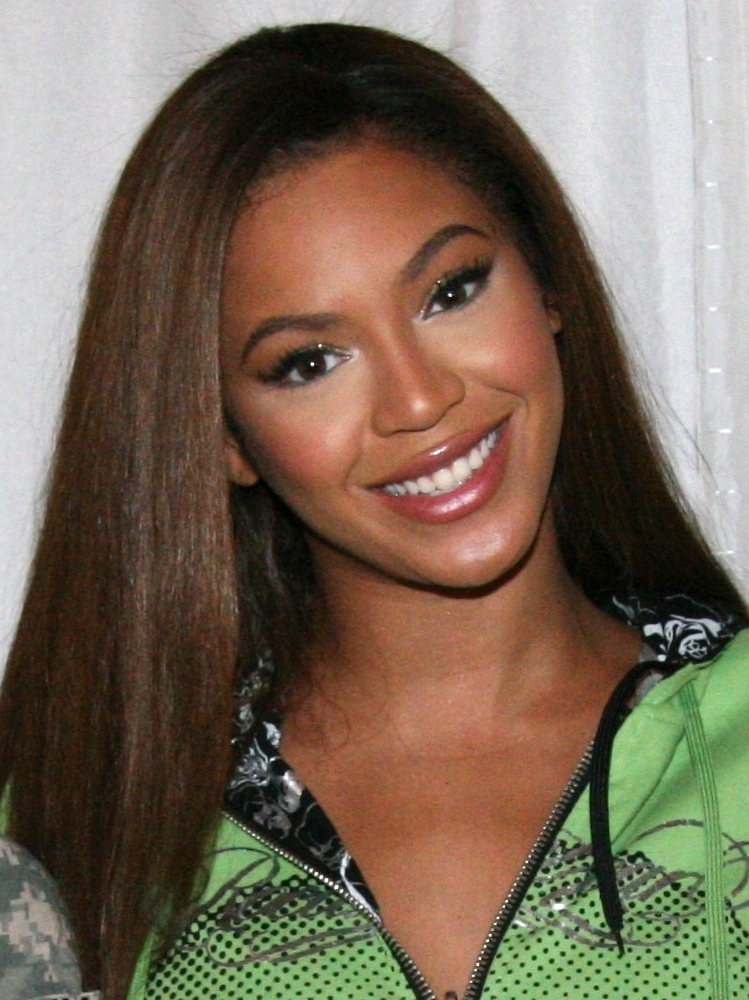
"Crazy in Love" is regarded as the song that propelled Beyoncé (pictured) to superstar status.

"Crazy in Love" is widely regarded as the song that launched Beyoncé into global superstardom as a solo artist. In a retrospective ranking of the greatest songs of 2003, Billboard placed it at number one, describing it as her "grandiose, chart-topping introduction as a solo superstar". American Songwriter observed that as it became clear that Destiny's Child would not continue to sustain Beyoncé's success, "Crazy in Love" marked the beginning of her "meteoric rise as a culture-shifting superstar". Paste described the song as one of the artist's greatest achievements, adding that "she still rules the world, and this was the first proclamation of that singular truth". Parade said that the song put her "on the map as a serious solo artist for the first time", while Financial Times said that "Crazy in Love" instantly cemented Beyoncé's status as "modern pop's ruling diva".

Alexis Petridis, writing in The Guardian, described "Crazy in Love" as "one of the most impermeable pop singles of the 21st century". He argued that if one were to launch a solo career, the song provided the ideal blueprint. Revolt stated that it "set the tone for [the] Dangerously in Love era where a slew of more hits were still to come" and credited the song with "set[ting] a new precedent for solo stars seeking a differentiation from their groups". NME wrote in 2018 that the song had "gotten even better over the years", adding that Beyoncé's performance at the Coachella Valley Music and Arts Festival that year demonstrated what an "outrageously brilliant" track it remained. Stereogum described "Crazy in Love" as a "modern standard" and an "instant game-changer" and praised its production, which gave it a sense of "pop maximalism".

=== Accolades and rankings ===
At the 46th Annual Grammy Awards in 2004, "Crazy in Love" was nominated for three accolades: Best R&B Song, Best Rap/Sung Collaboration, and Record of the Year; it won all but the lattermost. A remix of Crazy in Love, titled "Krazy in Luv" (Maurice's Nu Soul Mix), earned Maurice Joshua the Grammy Award for Best Remixed Recording, Non-Classical. In Europe, Crazy in Love won Best Song at the 2003 MTV Europe Music Awards. The song won Best Collaboration at the BET Awards, and was nominated for Outstanding Song at the NAACP Image Awards. "Crazy in Love" was also recognized at the 2004 ASCAP Pop Music Awards.

On their lists of the best songs of the 2000s decade, NME and VH1 ranked it first; Rolling Stone ranked it third; Pitchfork ranked it fourth; Slant ranked it sixth; and The Daily Telegraph ranked it seventh. In 2018, Rolling Stone named "Crazy in Love" as the greatest song of the 21st century, before ranking it at number three in its 2025 revision. The publication initially placed the song at number 118 on its list of the "500 Greatest Songs of All Time" (2004); and by 2021 it was at number sixteen. NME listed the song at number nineteen on its ranking of the 500 greatest songs of all time.

== Release and commercial performance ==
"Crazy in Love" was released as the lead single from Beyoncé's debut studio album, Dangerously in Love (2003). It was first released for digital download via the iTunes Store in the US on May 14, 2003. Columbia Records serviced the song to rhythmic contemporary, contemporary hit radio, and urban contemporary radio stations in the country four days later. On June 20, the track was distributed as a CD single in Ireland and a digital EP in Germany. In the UK, "Crazy in Love" was issued as a CD single ten days later. On July 8, "Crazy in Love" was released as a digital EP in several European countries (Note: Austria, Belgium, Denmark, Finland, Italy, the Netherlands, Norway, Sweden, and Ireland.) and Canada.

On the week of May 24, 2003, "Crazy in Love" debuted at number fifty-eight on the US Billboard Hot 100 chart. Although it had not yet been released to retail stores, the single attracted significant attention and reached number one on the Billboard Hot 100 based solely on airplay. In the same week that "Crazy in Love" reached number one on the Billboard Hot 100, Beyoncé's debut solo album Dangerously in Love entered the US Billboard 200 at number one on July 12, 2003. Sustained airplay, followed by strong retail performance, helped the single maintain eight consecutive weeks atop the Hot 100. "Crazy in Love" marked Beyoncé's first number-one single as a solo artist. According to Nielsen SoundScan, it was also the most downloaded song in the US for four consecutive weeks in July 2003. "Crazy in Love" is her third-most successful song on the Hot 100, where it spent 27 weeks in total. It topped other US Billboard charts, including the Hot R&B/Hip-Hop Singles & Tracks, Dance Radio Airplay, Mainstream Top 40, and Rhythmic Top 40 charts. In December 2024, the song was certified eight-times platinum by the Recording Industry Association of America, indicating shipments of eight million units in the US.

"Crazy in Love" became Beyoncé's first solo number-one in the UK, topping the singles chart for three consecutive weeks. She became the third female artist to simultaneously top the UK singles and albums charts, and the first to concurrently chart at number one on both those UK charts, the US Billboard Hot 100, and Billboard 200. As of March 2018, it has sold over one million units in the UK, making it her second best-performing song in the country. "Crazy in Love" reached number one on the Irish Singles Chart and peaked at number two on both the Australian ARIA Singles Chart and New Zealand Singles Chart. "Crazy in Love" reached the top ten across much of Europe, including Austria, the Belgian regions of Flanders and Wallonia, Denmark, Germany, Hungary, Italy, the Netherlands, Norway, Sweden, and Switzerland. The song received multi-platinum certifications in Australia (eleven-times platinum), New Zealand (six-times platinum), the UK (five-times platinum), Spain (two-times platinum), Italy (two-times platinum), and Denmark (two-times platinum).

== Music video ==
The music video of "Crazy in Love" was directed by Jake Nava and filmed in downtown Los Angeles. In an MTV Making the Video episode, Beyoncé described the video's conception: "[It] celebrates the evolution of a woman. It is about a girl who is at the point of a relationship. She realizes that she is in love, she is doing stuff she would not normally do but she does not care. It does not matter she is just crazy in love." Stylist Ty Hunter stated that the outfits in the video were intended to incrementally transition from minimal styling to high fashion.

The music video opens with Jay-Z riding as a passenger in a car, who then encounters Beyoncé standing in a nearby roadway. The video then shifts to a series of dance sequences featuring Beyoncé, beginning with her performing in a white tank top, denim shorts, and red high heels, including a solo routine on a raised platform. Subsequent scenes include a gold-toned set styled as a photo shoot and a sequence in which dancers perform choreography against a wall while wearing coordinated outfits. Jay-Z reappears and ignites a trail of gasoline leading to a car beneath the bridge, which explodes. He performs in front of the burning vehicle while Beyoncé dances nearby, wearing a silk-print outfit layered with a fur coat, before interacting with a fire hydrant that releases water. The video concludes with Beyoncé and her dancers, dressed in colorful Versace outfits, performing in front of a large fan.

The music video received acclaim by music critics. Cynthia Fuchs, writing for PopMatters, commented that the photo-shoot scene uses the routine used by Jennifer Lopez in the video for "Jenny from the Block" (2002) with "hot lights, scary makeup, and lots of [shots of] leg[s]". The Fader wrote that "Crazy in Love" marked the beginning of what would become "a non-stop flow of beautifully executed music videos that would eventually culminate in visual albums like her self-titled 2013 release and 2016's Lemonade". Writing for The Guardian, Yomi Adegoke described the video as resembling a "one-woman variety show" in which Beyoncé "gives all she's got"; she praised its "six outfit changes, each more grandiose than the last". It won three awards at the 2003 MTV Video Music Awards: Best Female Video, Best R&B Video, and Best Choreography.

== Live performances ==
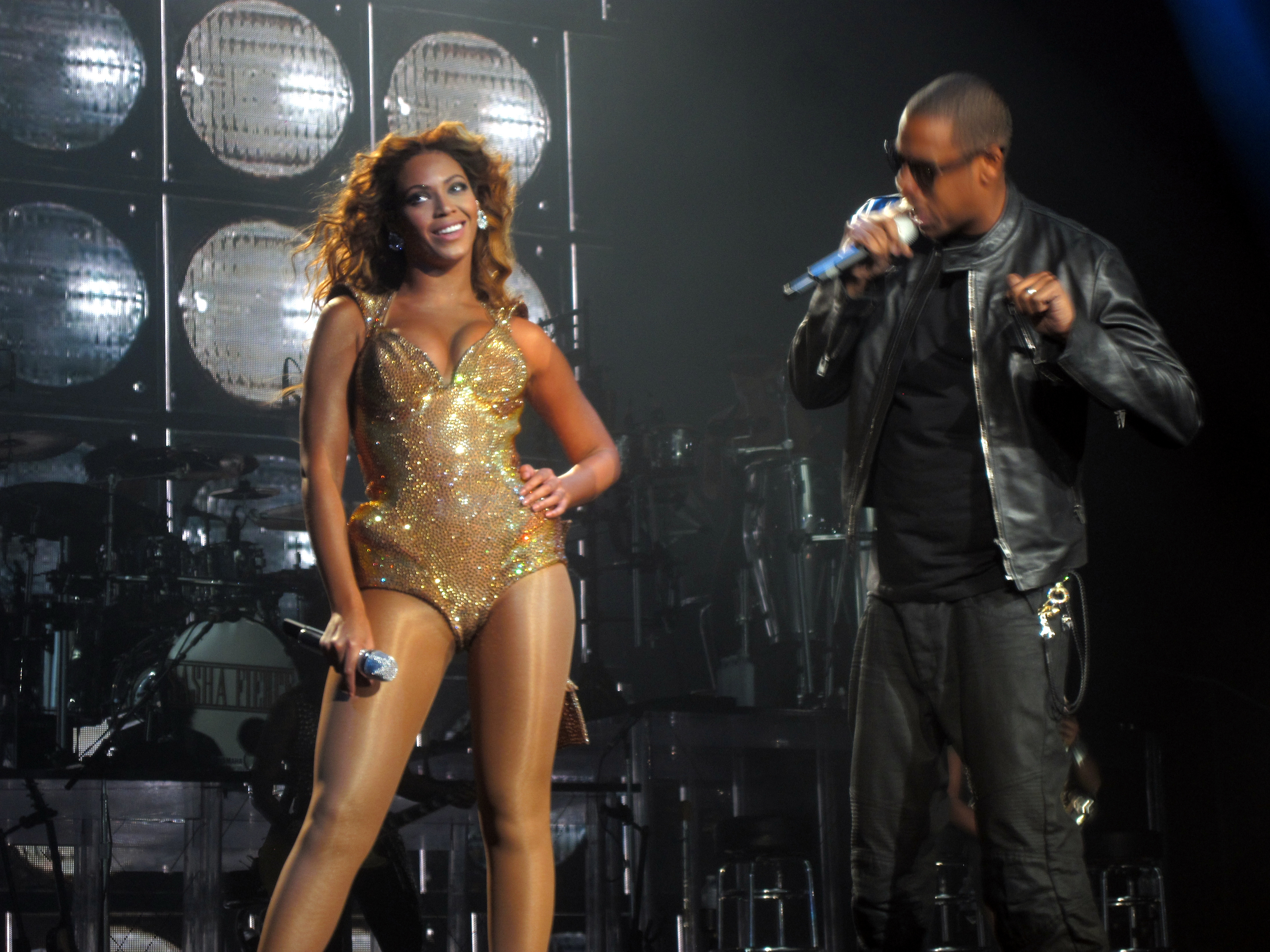
Jay-Z and Beyoncé performing "Crazy in Love" during her 2009 I Am... World Tour

Beyoncé first performed "Crazy in Love" with Jay-Z on Saturday Night Live. They also performed the song during the 2003 MTV Video Music Awards. She sang the song in a medley, with the pre-recorded vocals of Sean Paul on "Baby Boy" (2003). "Crazy in Love" was included on the set list for most of Beyoncé's concert tours. The song was the closing track of her Dangerously in Love World Tour that began in late 2003. On February 8, 2004, Prince appeared at the 46th Annual Grammy Awards with Beyoncé. In a performance that opened the show, they performed a medley of "Purple Rain", "Let's Go Crazy", "Baby I'm a Star", and Beyoncé's "Crazy in Love". Beyoncé performed "Crazy in Love" live at the 2004 BRIT Awards February 17, 2004. Monique Jessen And Todd Peterson wrote that she, "...lit up the stage with her performance of "Crazy in Love", wearing a white Roberto Cavalli dress and nearly half a million dollars worth of diamonds. The pop diva, appearing onstage in a puff of smoke, stopped midway through the song to pull up her top before walking away with the best international female solo artist award." Beyoncé and Jay-Z also performed "Crazy in Love" at The Prince's Trust Urban Music Festival at Earls Court in London on May 31, 2004.

"Crazy in Love" has been included in all of Beyoncé's headlining concert tours as of 2025. Performances of the song are additionally included in the live albums The Beyoncé Experience Live (2007), the deluxe edition of I Am... World Tour (2010), and Homecoming: The Live Album (2019). "Crazy in Love" was the first song on Beyoncé's set list on The Beyoncé Experience and the I Am... tour on several dates. On August 5, 2007, Beyoncé performed the song at Madison Square Garden in New York City. Beyoncé emerged in a sparkling silver dress with a long train. She walked to the front of the stage, did a couple of snaps of her neck and then started singing "Crazy in Love". She climbed a staircase where her all-female band and three backup singers were positioned. The staircase moved forward in two places; top part moved while the bottom poked out more. At the top of her staircase, she removed her train and returned to the main stage. Her backup singers followed and danced with Beyoncé. After "Crazy in Love", Beyoncé performed a short rendition of Gnarls Barkley's "Crazy" (2006), singing: "Who do you, who do you think you are? / Ha, ha, ha, bless your soul."

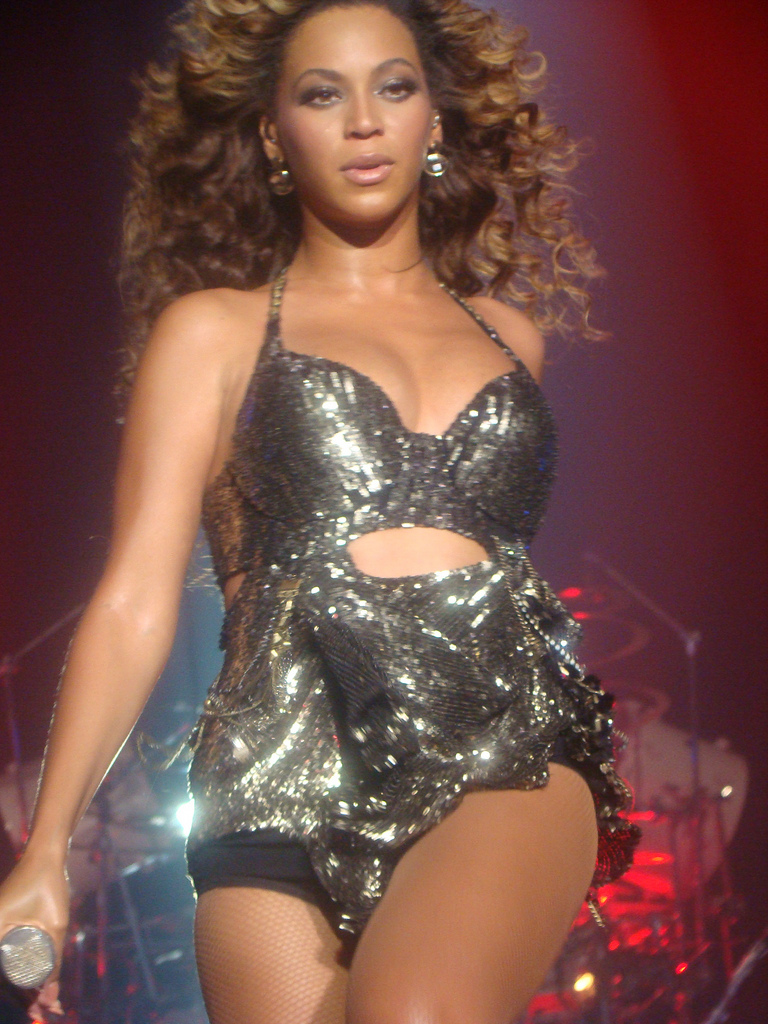
Beyoncé performing "Crazy in Love" during her 4 Intimate Nights with Beyoncé revue.

Shaheem Reid of MTV News wrote: "There are few (very few) ladies out there who can really sing, a lot who can dance, a lot more who look good — but really no other who can combine all three and add iconic star power like Miss Beyoncé, arguably the best all-around stage performer in the game right now." Jon Pareles of The New York Times wrote: "Beyoncé needs no distractions from her singing, which can be airy or brassy, tearful or vicious, rapid-fire with staccato syllables or sustained in curlicued melismas. But she was in constant motion, strutting in costumes (most of them silvery), from miniskirts to formal dresses, flesh-toned bodysuit to bikini to negligee." Frank Scheck of The Hollywood Reporter wrote: "Her performance of 'Crazy in Love' featured some surprising arrangements that gave the material freshness". Beyoncé performed "Crazy in Love" wearing a pink fringe dress at a concert at Palais Nikaïa in Nice, France, on June 20, 2011, in support of her album 4, and at her historic headlining Glastonbury Festival Performance on June 26, 2011.

In August 2011, Beyoncé performed "Crazy in Love" during her revue show 4 Intimate Nights with Beyoncé. She performed a slowed-down, jazzier version of the song and danced with a similar routine to the one in the music video. During the ITV special A Night With Beyoncé which aired on December 4 in the United Kingdom, Beyoncé performed "Crazy in Love" to a selected crowd of fans. In May 2012, she performed the song during her Revel Presents: Beyoncé Live revue in Atlantic City, New Jersey, United States' entertainment resort, hotel, casino and spa, Revel. During the performance, Jay-Z did not appear on stage but his pre-recorded voice was heard. Dan DeLuca of noted that the song was one of the "beat-savvy booty-shaking workouts" performed during the revue. Jim Farber of New York Daily News wrote that "The first, and last parts of the show stressed the steeliest Beyoncé, told in bold songs" like "Crazy in Love". A writer for BET noted that, "She dazzled fans with an assortment of high-energy performances of her upbeat hits like... 'Crazy in Love.'" Beyoncé also performed the song at the Super Bowl XLVII halftime show held on February 3, 2013. In July 2013, while placing Beyoncé at number 33 on their list of 50 Best Live Musicians, the writers of Rolling Stone magazine noted that the performance of "Crazy in Love" was a highlight during her live shows with the singer "expertly poppin' her booty".

== Cover versions ==
Several artists have recorded cover versions of "Crazy in Love". In 2003, Irish singer-songwriter Mickey Joe Harte recorded an acoustic rendition of "Crazy In Love" for the charity album Even Better Than the Real Thing Vol. 1. Alternative rock band Snow Patrol recorded the song during a BBC session with Zane Lowe. Snow Patrol's version was released as a B-side to the single "Spitting Games", on the 2005 compilation Cosmosonica – Tom Middleton Presents Crazy Covers Vol. 1 and on Snow Patrol's 2009 compilation album Up to Now Ross Langager of PopMatters noted that their cover "sparks an initial chuckle of recognition but soon after becomes more than a bit unfortunate". David Byrne closed his concert at the Hollywood Bowl on June 27, 2005, with a samba-tinged version of "Crazy in Love". In 2007, American alternative rock band Switchfoot produced a rock version that was released as part of Yahoo!'s CoverArt series. Switchfoot produced a video for their cover version. Nashville-based indie quintet Wild Cub performed a version of the song in June 2014 for The A.V. Club's A.V. Undercover series.

British band The Magic Numbers performed "Crazy in Love" on the Australian radio station Triple J, and recorded it for the Starbucks (Hear Music) compilation album, Sounds Eclectic: The Covers Project (2007). Tracy Bonham covered the song with guitar and violin accompaniment, for her 2007 album In The City + In The Woods. British close harmony trio The Puppini Sisters covered "Crazy in Love" for their 2007 album The Rise and Fall of Ruby Woo; this was remixed by the electronica jazz outfit The Real Tuesday Weld. Indie artist Dsico recorded an electronic cover of the song. In 2009, Pattern Is Movement recorded a cover of "Crazy in Love", which they claimed was inspired by Anohni's version; this cover was included on their September 4, 2009 Daytrotter session. Antony and the Johnsons released an orchestral version of the song as the B-side to their 2009 single "Aeon". Indie singer-songwriter Eden recorded a cover version of "Crazy in Love" for Final Call, his final extended play (EP) under the Eden Project alias.

German group The Baseballs covered the song in rockabilly style for their debut album, Strike! Back, in August 2010. "Crazy in Love" was performed live on Australian Idol during the first season by winner Guy Sebastian on the Final 2 showdown in 2003. A jazz version was performed during the fourth season by runner-up Jessica Mauboy on the Final 6 Big Band show in 2006. In June 2008, Mauboy performed "Crazy in Love" on Indonesian Idol with some eliminated season 5 contestants. Singapore Idol contestant Maia Lee performed "Crazy in Love" on the show. In March 2012, Swing Republic released their electro swing cover version, which also ended up on their album released the same year entitled Midnight Calling. In June 2012, Robin Thicke and Olivia Chisholm covered the song on the show Duets. Kate Kroll of Rolling Stone gave a negative review for Chisholm's performance, saying that "Her voice sounded thin, and she just can't seem to shake that Stepford Wife stare." Emeli Sandé and The Bryan Ferry Orchestra recorded a cover of the song which was included on The Great Gatsby soundtrack (2013). Upon hearing a preview of the song, Randall Roberts of the Los Angeles Times commented that the cover was the best song on the album, sung with a "surprising, simmering urgency". Kyle Anderson of Entertainment Weekly also wrote that the swing cover of "Crazy in Love" was one of the highlights on the album. On October 21, 2013, Third Degree covered "Crazy in Love" on the fifth season of The X Factor Australia, and on May 4, 2014, C Major covered the song on the third series of The Voice Australia. In 2015, Monica Michael covered the song on series 12 of The X Factor UK. Filipina actress Denise Laurel covered the song while impersonating Beyoncé, based on her performance at the Super Bowl XLVII halftime show on Your Face Sounds Familiar, in which Laurel won the second season.

== Usage in media ==
In 2002, Beyoncé signed a contract with Pepsi, and appeared on several of its advertising campaigns, one of which featured "Crazy in Love" as background music. After winning the Best Collaboration Award for "Crazy in Love" at the 2004 BET Awards, Beyoncé dedicated the award to the show's host, comedian Mo'Nique, who parodied the choreography from the "Crazy in Love" video with six equally voluptuous female dancers. "Crazy in Love" was included on the official soundtrack albums of the following films: Bridget Jones: The Edge of Reason (2004), White Chicks (2004), Taxi (2004), Good Luck Chuck (2007), Gayby (2012), and Love, Rosie (2014), as well in the tenth season of Brazilian soap opera Malhação. The song started off the reality competition show Dancing with the Stars in the 500th episode of the series, during its 33rd season in 2024, choreographed by the professional dancing married couple Daniella Karagach and Pasha Pashkov with dancers from past seasons dancing to it, including judge Derek Hough and his sister/co-host Julianne Hough. In 2009, the cast of Glee performed a mash up of the songs "Hair" from the musical Hair and "Crazy in Love" in season one, episode eleven "Hairography". A parody of the song is also used in the Disney Channel show That's So Raven, in the 2005 season 3 episode "Hizzouse Party" where Raven Baxter (Raven-Symoné) is seen dancing to the song, calling it "her jam". It was featured on the video games Karaoke Revolution Party and Just Dance 2. On the eleventh series of Dancing on Ice in 2019, Gemma Collins and Matt Evers performed to the song on the first week of the competition.

== Remixes ==
"Crazy in Love (Fifty Shades of Grey version)"

Single by Beyoncé

from the album Fifty Shades of Grey: Original Motion Picture Soundtrack
- Released: February 10, 2015
- Recorded: 2014
- Genre: Chamber pop; R&B
- Length: 3:46
- Label: Parkwood; Columbia
- Songwriters: Beyoncé Knowles; Rich Harrison; Shawn Carter; Eugene Record
- Producers: Boots; Margot

Beyoncé singles chronology
"Ring Off" (2015)	"Crazy in Love (Fifty Shades of Grey version)" (2015)	"Runnin' (Lose It All)" (2015)

Fifty Shades soundtrack singles chronology
"Love Me like You Do" (2015)	"Crazy in Love (Fifty Shades Of Grey version)" (2015)	"I Don't Wanna Live Forever" (2016)

"Crazy in Love" has various remixes, including the Rockwilder remix, Maurice Joshua's Nu Soul remix, and Junior's World remix. These versions appeared on the single releases of "Crazy in Love" under an alternative spelling, "Krazy in Luv". The Rockwilder remix slows down the beat and makes the song deeper and funkier with chopped-up horn samples and sparkling synth textures from sampling "Don't Stop the Music" by Yarbrough and Peoples. Maurice's Nu Soul Remix speeds up the beat, taking it from hip-hop to house territory. A version of the song included on an Asian special edition of Dangerously in Love features a rap in Mandarin Chinese performed by American-Taiwanese singer Vanness Wu, instead of Jay-Z's performance.

"Crazy in Love" was re-recorded by Beyoncé for the soundtrack of the film Fifty Shades of Grey (2015) and used for its trailer, which was released on July 24, 2014. The slowed-down version was produced by Boots with violin arrangements by Margot, both of whom worked on Beyoncé's self-titled fifth studio album (2013), and, unlike the original, doesn't feature Jay-Z. Margot said: "It inspires me to work on other artists' songs [because] it pushes my boundaries in a direction that I wouldn't necessarily come up with. Obviously I know how 'Crazy in Love' goes, but I knew there was the possibility her vocals would be different. It's almost more vulnerable and beautiful this way, because you do do crazy things when you fall in love. To hear the mood reversed and flipped makes it even more powerful."

The track was then officially released through the iTunes Store on February 10, 2015. The single cover artwork uses the same image used in the original cover, but in black and white. The rendition was performed for the first time during the 2015 Budweiser Made in America Festival on September 5, 2015, and was included on the set list of The Formation World Tour (2016), alongside the original version.

== Track listings and formats ==
"Crazy in Love" – Digital download
No.	Title	Length
1.	"Crazy in Love" (featuring Jay-Z)	3:56

"Krazy in Luv" – Canadian and European digital EP and UK CD single
No.	Title	Length
1.	"Crazy in Love" (featuring Jay-Z)	3:56
2.	"Krazy in Luv" (Adam 12 So Crazy Remix) (featuring Jay-Z)	4:29
3.	"Krazy in Luv" (Rockwilder Remix) (featuring Jay-Z)	4:12
Total length:		12:37

"Krazy in Luv" – German digital EP
No.	Title	Length
1.	"Crazy in Love" (featuring Jay-Z)	3:56
2.	"Summertime" (featuring P. Diddy)	3:54
3.	"Krazy in Luv" (Maurice's Nu Soul Remix) (featuring Jay-Z)	6:29
Total length:		13:39

"Crazy in Love" – European CD single
No.	Title	Length
1.	"Crazy in Love" (featuring Jay-Z)	3:56
2.	"Crazy in Love" (Without Rap)	3:43
Total length:		7:39

"Crazy in Love" – German and Australian CD maxi single
No.	Title	Length
1.	"Crazy in Love" (Single version) (featuring Jay-Z)	4:10
2.	"Summertime" (featuring P. Diddy)	3:54
3.	"Krazy in Luv" (Maurice's Nu Soul Remix) (featuring Jay-Z)	6:29
4.	"Krazy in Luv" (Rockwilder Remix) (featuring Jay-Z)	4:12
5.	"Crazy in Love" (Music video) (featuring Jay-Z)	3:56
Total length:		22:01

"Crazy in Love" (Fifty Shades Of Grey version) – Digital download
No.	Title	Length
1.	"Crazy in Love" (2015 Version)	3:46

== Credits and personnel ==
=== Recording and management ===
- Recorded at Sony Music Studios (New York City)
- Mixed at The Hit Factory (New York City)
- Additional vocals recorded at The Hit Factory (New York City)
- Contains samples of the composition "Are You My Woman (Tell Me So)", written by Eugene Record, published by Unichappell Music Inc. (BMI) and performed by The Chi-Lites (courtesy of Brunswick Records)
- Jay-Z appears courtesy of Roc-A-Fella Records and Def Jam Recordings
- Published by Beyoncé Publishing (ASCAP), Hitco South South (ASCAP) — all rights administered by Music of Windswept (ASCAP) — EMI Blackwood Music Inc. OBO Itself (BMI), Dam Rich Music (BMI), EMI April Music Inc. OBO Itself (BMI), Carter Boyd Publishing (ASCAP) and Unichappell Music Inc. (BMI)

=== Personnel ===
- Beyoncé – songwriting, lead vocals, background vocals, production
- Rich Harrison – production, instrumentation
- Pat Thrall – recording
- Tony Maserati – mixing
- Jim Caruana – engineer
- Pat Woodward – assistant mix engineer
- Luz Vasquez – assistant mix engineer
- Jay-Z – songwriting, vocals
- Maurice Joshua – remixing

== Charts ==
=== Weekly charts ===
2003 weekly chart performance for "Crazy in Love"
Chart (2003)	Peak position
Australia (ARIA)	2
Australian Urban (ARIA)	2
Austria (Ö3 Austria Top 40)	6
Belgium (Ultratop 50 Flanders)	5
Belgium (Ultratop 50 Wallonia)	10
Canada (Nielsen SoundScan)	2
Croatia International Airplay (HRT)	1
Denmark (Tracklisten)	5
Europe (European Hot 100 Singles)	1
Finland (Suomen virallinen lista)	12
France (SNEP)	21
Germany (GfK)	6
Greece (IFPI)	3
Hungary (Rádiós Top 40)	2
Hungary (Dance Top 40)	2
Hungary (Single Top 40)	3
Ireland (IRMA)	1
Italy (FIMI)	5
Netherlands (Dutch Top 40)	2
Netherlands (Single Top 100)	2
New Zealand (Recorded Music NZ)	2
Norway (VG-lista)	5
Poland (Polish Airplay Top 100)	9
Romania (Romanian Top 100)	4
Scottish Singles Sales (Official Charts)	1
Spain (Promusicae)	2
Sweden (Sverigetopplistan)	4
Switzerland (Schweizer Hitparade)	3
UK Singles (Official Charts)	1
US Billboard Hot 100	1
US Adult Pop Airplay (Billboard)	29
US Dance Club Songs (Billboard) J. Vasquez & M. Joshua Remixes	1
US Dance Singles Sales (Billboard) J. Vasquez & M. Joshua Remixes	4
US Dance Airplay (Billboard)	1
US Hot R&B/Hip-Hop Songs (Billboard)	1
US Pop Airplay (Billboard)	1
US Rhythmic Airplay (Billboard)	1

2012 weekly chart performance for "Crazy in Love"
Chart (2012)	Peak position
Japan (Japan Hot 100)	94

2024–2026 weekly chart performance for "Crazy in Love"
Chart (2024–2026)	Peak position
Global 200 (Billboard)	195
Nigeria Bubbling Under Hot 100 (TurnTable)	22
UK Hip Hop/R&B (Official Charts)	11

=== Year-end charts ===
Year-end chart performance for "Crazy in Love"
Chart (2003)	Position
Australia (ARIA)	28
Australian Urban (ARIA)	14
Austria (Ö3 Austria)	50
Belgium (Ultratop 50 Flanders)	20
Belgium (Ultratop 50 Wallonia)	40
Brazil (Crowley)	39
Europe (European Hot 100 Singles)	14
France (SNEP)	86
Germany (Media Control GfK)	37
Ireland (IRMA)	12
Italy (FIMI)	22
Netherlands (Dutch Top 40)	15
Netherlands (Single Top 100)	28
New Zealand (RIANZ)	24
Romania (Romanian Top 100)	39
Sweden (Hitlistan)	33
Switzerland (Schweizer Hitparade)	11
UK Singles (OCC)	15
UK Urban (Music Week)	3
US Billboard Hot 100	4
US Dance Club Play (Billboard)	38
US Hot R&B/Hip-Hop Singles & Tracks (Billboard)	14
US Mainstream Top 40 (Billboard)	11
US Rhythmic Top 40 (Billboard)	11
US Top 40 Tracks (Billboard)	9

=== Decade-end charts ===
Decade-end chart performance for "Crazy in Love"
Chart (2000–2009)	Position
US Billboard Hot 100	40

== Certifications ==
Certifications and sales for "Crazy in Love"
Region	Certification	Certified units/sales
Australia (ARIA)	11× Platinum	770,000^{‡}
Belgium (BRMA)	Gold	10,000^{‡}
Canada (Music Canada)	5× Platinum	400,000^{‡}
Denmark (IFPI Danmark)	2× Platinum	180,000^{‡}
Germany (BVMI)	3× Gold	900,000^{‡}
Italy (FIMI)	2× Platinum	200,000^{‡}
New Zealand (RMNZ)	6× Platinum	180,000^{‡}
Norway (IFPI Norway)	Gold	5,000^{*}
Portugal (AFP)	Platinum	40,000^{‡}
Spain (Promusicae)	2× Platinum	120,000^{‡}
United Kingdom (BPI)	5× Platinum	3,000,000^{‡}
United States (RIAA)	8× Platinum	8,000,000^{‡}
Ringtone
Japan (RIAJ) Full-length ringtone	Gold	100,000^{*}
Japan (RIAJ) Ringtone	2× Platinum	500,000^{*}
United States (RIAA) Mastertone	Gold	500,000^{*}
Streaming
Greece (IFPI Greece)	Platinum	2,000,000^{†}
^{*} Sales figures based on certification alone.^{‡} Sales+streaming figures based on certification alone.^{†} Streaming-only figures based on certification alone.

== Release history ==
Release dates and formats for "Crazy in Love"
Region	date	Format(s)	Version(s)	Label(s)	Ref.
United States	May 18, 2003	Contemporary hit radio; rhythmic contemporary radio; urban contemporary radio	Original	Columbia	
United States	May 20, 2003	Digital download	Original	Columbia	
France	June 30, 2003	Maxi CD	Original; "Krazy in Luv"	Columbia	
Germany	June 30, 2003	Maxi CD	Original; "Krazy in Luv"	Sony Music	
Germany	June 30, 2003	Digital download (EP)	"Krazy in Luv"	Sony Music	
United Kingdom	June 30, 2003	Maxi CD	"Krazy in Luv"	Columbia	
United Kingdom	June 30, 2003	Maxi CD	Original	Columbia	
Australia	July 7, 2003	Maxi CD	Original; "Krazy in Luv"	Sony Music	
France	July 7, 2003	DVD	Original	Columbia	
United States	July 8, 2003	DVD	Original	Columbia	
Various	February 10, 2015	Digital download; streaming	Fifty Shades of Grey	Columbia; Parkwood	

== See also ==
- List of best-selling singles
- List of European number-one hits of 2003
- List of highest-certified singles in Australia
- List of number-one singles of 2003 (Ireland)
- List of Hot R&B/Hip-Hop Singles & Tracks number ones of 2003
- List of Billboard Hot 100 number-one singles of 2003
- List of number-one dance singles of 2003 (U.S.)
- List of Hot R&B/Hip-Hop Singles & Tracks number ones of 2003
- List of artists who have achieved simultaneous UK and US number-one hits
- List of best-selling singles in Australia
