= Baby Boy (Beyoncé song) =

2003 single by Beyoncé featuring Sean Paul

Single by Beyoncé featuring Sean Paul

from the album Dangerously in Love and Dutty Rock
- B-side: "Summertime" (remix)
- Released: August 3, 2003
- Recorded: March 2003
- Studio: The Hit Factory (New York City); South Beach (Miami)
- Genre: Dancehall; R&B
- Length: 4:04
- Label: Columbia; Music World
- Songwriters: Beyoncé Knowles; Sean Paul Henriques; Scott Storch; Robert Waller; Shawn Carter
- Producers: Beyoncé; Scott Storch

Beyoncé singles chronology
"Crazy in Love" (2003)	"Baby Boy" (2003)	"Fighting Temptation" (2003)

Sean Paul singles chronology
"Like Glue" (2003)	"Baby Boy" (2003)	"I'm Still in Love with You" (2004)

Music video
- "Baby Boy" on YouTube

"Baby Boy" is a song by American singer Beyoncé featuring Jamaican dancehall musician Sean Paul, from her debut solo studio album, Dangerously in Love (2003). It was also included on the reissue of Paul's second studio album, Dutty Rock (2002). Both Beyoncé and Paul co-wrote the song with Robert Waller, Jay-Z, and Scott Storch, who produced it with Beyoncé. Containing a lyrical interpolation of "No Fear" by hip-hop group O.G.C., "Baby Boy" is a dancehall and R&B song with Caribbean and Indian influences; its lyrics detail a woman's fantasies.

The song was released as the second single from Dangerously in Love on August 3, 2003, by Columbia Records and Music World Entertainment. "Baby Boy" topped the US Billboard Hot 100 for nine consecutive weeks and was Beyoncé's longest-running number-one single until 2007, when it was surpassed by "Irreplaceable". It was certified double platinum by the Australian Recording Industry Association (ARIA) and platinum by the Recording Industry Association of America (RIAA). "Baby Boy" also reached the top ten in Australia, Belgium, Denmark, France, Germany, Hungary, Ireland, the Netherlands, New Zealand, Norway, Spain, Sweden, Switzerland, and the United Kingdom.

The accompanying music video for "Baby Boy" was directed by Jake Nava and mostly shows Beyoncé dancing in various locations. The song has remained a staple of Beyoncé's concert set lists. The American Society of Composers, Authors and Publishers (ASCAP) recognized it as one of the most played songs of 2004. The following year, American singer-songwriter Jennifer Armour filed a copyright infringement lawsuit claiming that "Baby Boy" had used the primary musical hook from her song "Got a Little Bit of Love for You". The case was later dismissed.

== Background and release ==
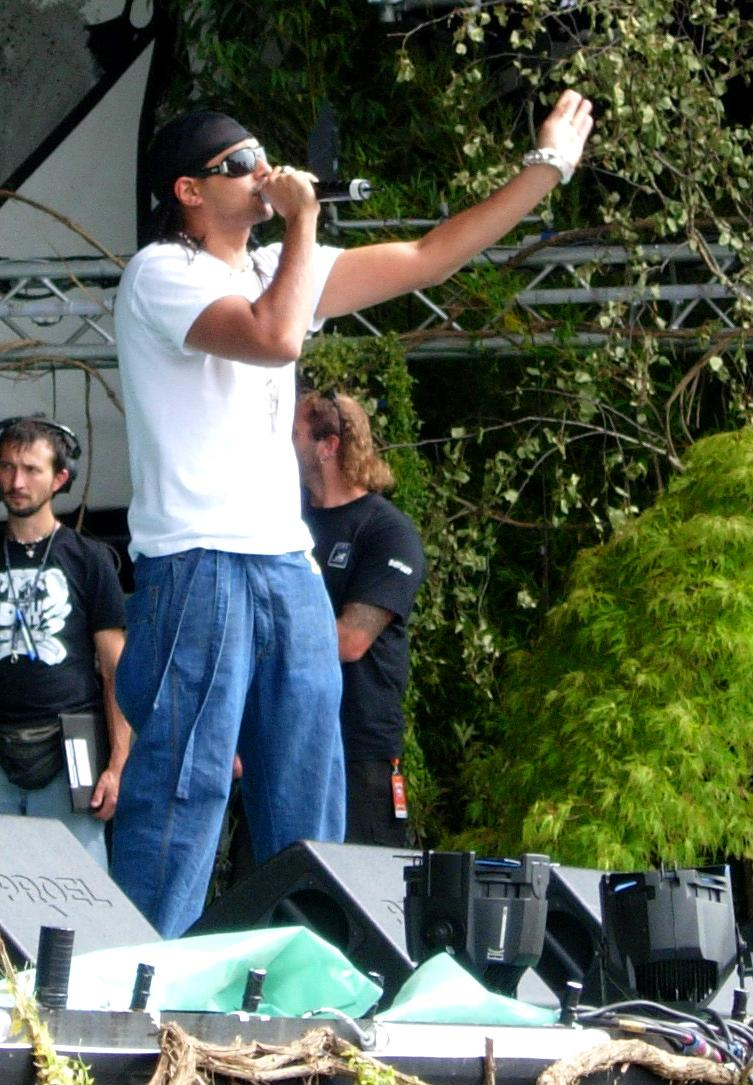
Sean Paul (pictured) contributed vocals to "Baby Boy".

In 2002, Beyoncé went to Miami, Florida, to work with Scott Storch for her debut solo studio album Dangerously in Love. She and Storch wrote "Baby Boy", with contributions from Robert Waller and Beyoncé's now-husband, Jay-Z. The song also contains a lyrical interpolation of "No Fear" by hip-hop group O.G.C. used toward the end of the song: "We steppin' in hotter this year".

Once the track was supposedly done, Beyoncé had the idea that it would be "perfect" if Sean Paul contributed a vocal track. Beyoncé contacted Paul about a possible collaboration for "Baby Boy". Sean Paul agreed, and flew in from Jamaica to join the recording sessions for the song. He contributed a toast verse, and they finished recording "Baby Boy" in March 2003, during the later stages of the album's recording sessions.

"Baby Boy" was released as the second single from Beyoncé's debut studio album, Dangerously in Love (2003). It was serviced to contemporary hit and rhythmic contemporary radio in the United States on August 3, 2003. It was released as a CD single and 12-inch single in the United Kingdom on October 6, 2003. The song was released as a maxi single in Canada the following day, and in Germany on October 13. It was released in the United States as a 12-inch and CD single on October 14 and 28, 2003, respectively. "Baby Boy" was included on the revamped edition of Sean Paul's second studio album Dutty Rock (2003).

== Music and lyrics ==
"Baby Boy"
"Baby Boy" is a hybrid of R&B and dancehall with influences of reggae, house and Indian music.

"Baby Boy" is a midtempo R&B and dancehall song with reggae, house, and South Asian influences. It was composed using common time in the key of C minor, and set in a moderate groove of 92 beats per minute. Storch's knowledge of Indian music contributes to its Asian influences. Neil Drumming of Entertainment Weekly noted that "'Baby Boy' goes full-tilt Bollywood 'n da hood, with Sean Paul ripping a pulsing tabla raga". Beyoncé's vocals are accompanied by clicky, castanet-sounding beats, synthesized handclaps, and slaps. According to gossip blogger Roger Friedman of Fox News Channel, "Baby Boy" is based on the reggae song "Here Comes the Hotstepper" (1995), performed by Jamaican singer Ini Kamoze.

"Baby Boy" is considered to be a sequel to Jay-Z's song "'03 Bonnie & Clyde" (2002) featuring Beyoncé. The lyrics detail a woman's fantasies, and in keeping with the album's overall theme, Beyoncé deemed them personal to her. Paul remarked: "She's telling me about her fantasies and picturing me and her going here and there, all over the world ... I'm answering back, like, 'I'm wit it'." The lyrics are constructed in a toast–chorus–verse structure; Sean Paul performs the toasting while Beyoncé sings all other verses and choruses. The pattern is repeated twice; an additional chorus and verse follow, resolving with the toasting and final verse.

== Controversy ==
In 2005, American singer-songwriter Jennifer Armour filed a copyright infringement lawsuit, claiming that Beyoncé had used some lyrics and the musical hook from her song "Got a Little Bit of Love for You". In 2003, Armour's former label manager had submitted demo recordings to record labels, including Beyoncé's Columbia Records and Sean Paul's Atlantic Records. According to the district court, an expert witness (Chair, Department of Music Theory & Composition, Shepherd School of Music, Rice University) determined the songs to be "substantially similar" (a requirement for an infringement finding). Concerning the musical hook, the expert witness stated in his report: "When the aural comparisons of the two songs are presented in the key of C minor (for easy comparison) and presented back-to-back, in A–B–A–B fashion, even the least musically inclined listener should immediately determine that the two songs are strikingly similar; I daresay that many listeners may even perceive them as being the same song! And again, transposing a song for this purpose does not alter any fundamental qualities or characteristics of the song but merely assists the ability of those unfamiliar with the technicalities of music in making a comparison." The district court judge nonetheless ruled that she, herself, couldn't hear the similarities between the two songs and dismissed the case, denying the motion for the songs or case to be heard by a jury. On appeal, the United States Court of Appeals for the Fifth Circuit affirmed the district court's ruling but with different reasoning. It held that there was no infringement based on Beyoncé's claim that Armour's demo tape was received shortly after the writing of Beyoncé's song had been substantially completed. However, the court did not address the issue of substantial similarity.

== Critical reception ==
"Baby Boy" was met with critical acclaim. Rolling Stone magazine reviewer Anthony DeCurtis wrote that Beyoncé sounded as if she was "having fun" on the song, while Stephen Thomas Erlewine of the online music guide service AllMusic described Beyoncé's vocals as "assured and sexy". Mark Anthony Neal of the international webzine PopMatters regarded "Baby Boy" as one of the "high-profile collaborations" on Dangerously in Love. Lisa Verrico of the daily British newspaper The Times described the song as a "Latino-tinged collaboration ... Paul does a reggae rap in the middle, but it's when he chats while Beyoncé half raps that the pair have real chemistry". Yancey Strickler of Flak magazine wrote that "'Baby Boy''s diwali stutter is enhanced by Sean Paul's dancehall monotone".

James Anthony of the British newspaper The Guardian commented that the track "bridges the gap between the genres of R&B and dancehall". Los Angeles Times writer Natalie Nichols wrote that "the ... house-spiced 'Baby Boy' successfully meld[s] [Beyoncé's] breathy cooing with hip, interesting production."

== Accolades ==
British record label EMI was honored by the American Society of Composers, Authors and Publishers (ASCAP) at the 2005 ASCAP Pop Music Awards as Publisher of the Year for publishing "Baby Boy", among other songs. Scott Storch earned the Songwriter of the Year award at the same event.

== Commercial performance ==
"Baby Boy" entered commercial charts before its physical release in the United States. The track led to a higher Billboard 200 chart position for Dangerously in Love, and helped the album attain multi-platinum certification in the United States. The single debuted on the Billboard Hot 100 at number 57, while its predecessor "Crazy in Love" was still in the top spot. "Baby Boy" dominated on US radio, ultimately reaching the top of the Billboard Hot 100. It reached the chart's top spot eight weeks after its debut and stayed there for nine consecutive weeks. The single stayed number one for a week longer than "Crazy in Love" had, becoming Beyoncé's longest-charting number-one single at the time. The feat was not surpassed until her single "Irreplaceable" (2006), from her second album B'Day (2006), spent ten weeks at the top spot from late 2006 until early 2007. The song became Sean Paul's second number-one single in the United States following the success of "Get Busy" a few months earlier. "Baby Boy" stayed on the Hot 100 for twenty-nine weeks and was certified platinum by the Recording Industry Association of America (RIAA) on June 6, 2006. "Baby Boy" achieved success on Billboard crossover and mainstream radio charts, appearing on the Top 40 Tracks, Rhythmic Top 40, and Mainstream Top 40 listings, as well as peaking atop the Dance Radio Airplay chart and reaching number two on the Dance Club Play chart. As of October 6, 2010, "Baby Boy" had sold 6,000 physical units in the United States.

Internationally, "Baby Boy" performed just as well, peaking inside the top ten on all of the charts it appeared on, excluding the Ö3 Austria Top 40, Ultratop 50 Wallonia, and Italian Singles Chart, on which it reached the top twenty. The single debuted at number two in the United Kingdom, becoming the chart's highest debut of the week and "Baby Boy"'s highest entry internationally. Even though it spent seventeen weeks on the chart, it failed to reach the top, being held off by "Where Is the Love?" by The Black Eyed Peas. In Australia and New Zealand, "Baby Boy" peaked at numbers three and two, respectively. It was certified platinum by the Australian Recording Industry Association (ARIA) for shipments in excess of 70,000 units.

== Music video ==
The music video for "Baby Boy" was filmed by English director Jake Nava, who also shot Beyoncé's "Crazy in Love" video. It was filmed in Miami on August 7–8, 2003. Parts of the video were captured in a house with rooms decorated in different styles: one in a Japanese style and one in an old English style.

Scenes featuring Beyoncé and Paul are shown separately. The video begins with Paul sitting on a throne while toasting; Beyoncé is leaning against a wall and dancing. In the following scene, Beyoncé is seen on a bed. Paul is shown with several women who are lying on the floor caressing each other. Beyoncé walks toward the beach; she spots a man, and the two touch and flirt. As the second verse begins, Beyoncé is at a party. At the party, Beyoncé decides to dance with the same man with whom she had interacted earlier. Then, water floods the floor of the party as she sings "the dance floor becomes the sea". As the second chorus of the song begins, the video cuts to scenes of Beyoncé and four backup dancers dancing on a platform in the sand on the beach. The original track is interrupted toward the end with an Arabic instrumental break designed for the music video. This section showcases Beyoncé vigorously dancing on the sand.

Sal Cinquemani of the online publication Slant Magazine described the video as a "baby-oil-logged follow-up" to "Crazy in Love"'s "bootylicious video". In 2013, John Boone and Jennifer Cady of E! Online placed the video at number nine on their list of Beyoncé's ten best music videos, praising the extended belly-dancing breakdown. "Baby Boy" premiered on MTV's program Total Request Live on August 25, 2003, at number ten and reached the top spot. It stayed on the show for forty-one days, matching the chart run of "Me, Myself and I".

== Live performances ==
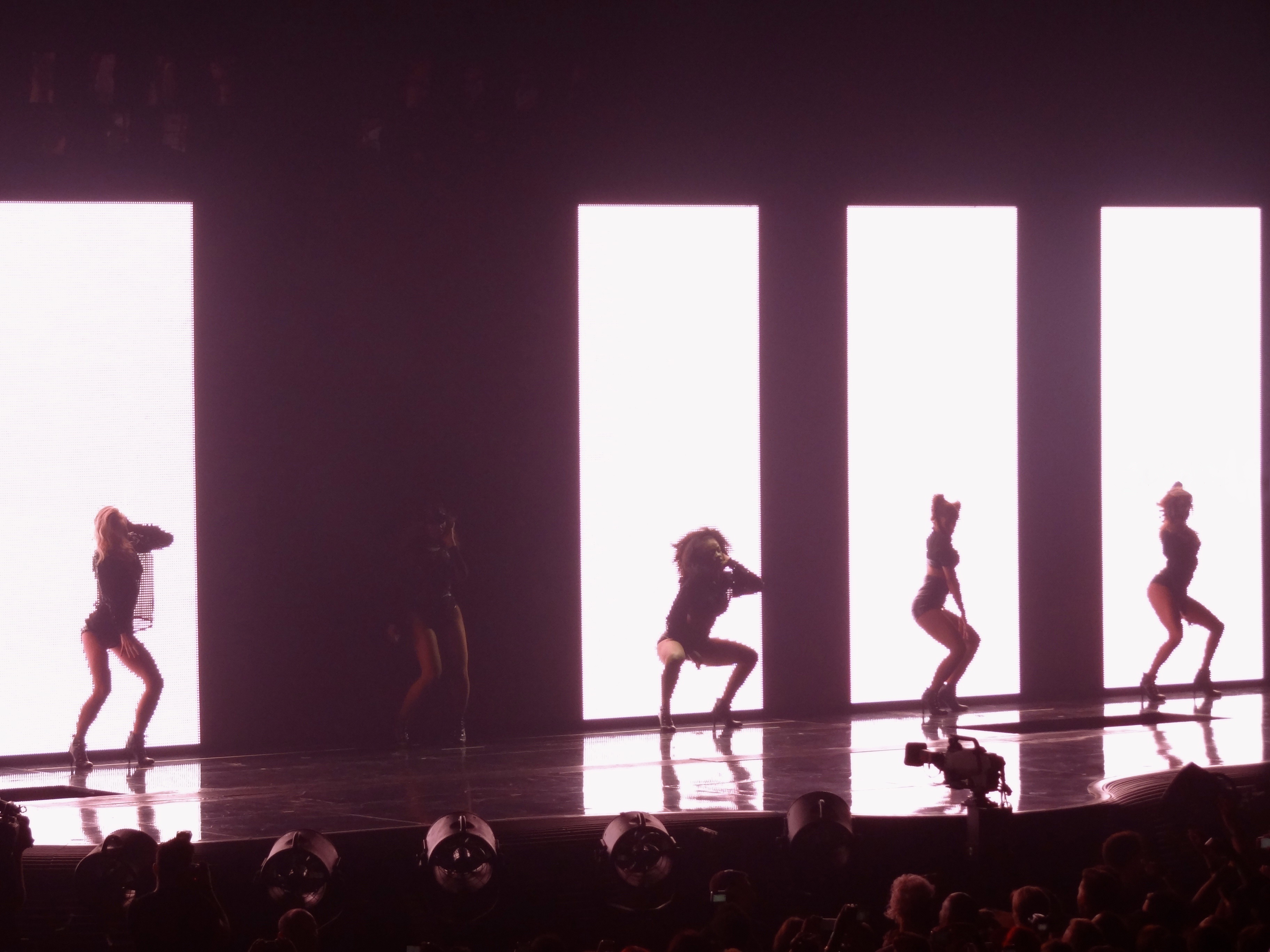
Beyoncé performing "Baby Boy" during The Mrs. Carter Show World Tour at the Bell Centre in Montreal, Quebec, on July 22, 2013

Beyoncé first performed "Baby Boy" live at the 2003 MTV Video Music Awards; she sang it in a medley with pre-recorded vocals from Paul. Beyoncé later sang "Baby Boy" with Paul at the 2003 MTV Europe Music Awards. "Baby Boy" has been included on the set list for most of Beyoncé's concert tours. It served as the opening song of her Dangerously in Love Tour (2003). During her performance of the song on the tour, she was initially suspended from the ceiling of the arena and gradually lowered to a red lounger—a prop she also used during the 2003 MTV Video Music Awards. The footage taken at Wembley Arena in London, England, was included on Beyoncé's first live album, Live at Wembley (2004). Beyoncé also performed "Baby Boy" with her former group Destiny's Child during their final tour, Destiny Fulfilled... and Lovin' It (2005), and it was included on their second live album, Live in Atlanta (2006).

"Baby Boy" was part of Beyoncé's set list for The Beyoncé Experience (2007) in Los Angeles, California, and the I Am... World Tour (2009–2010). On August 5, 2007, Beyoncé performed the song at Madison Square Garden in Manhattan, New York City; wearing a belly-dancer-style outfit, she descended the staircase holding an umbrella and was met by three men wearing fatigues. A short section of Chaka Demus & Pliers' song "Murder She Wrote" (1993) was incorporated into "Baby Boy". Jon Pareles of The New York Times praised the performance, writing that Beyoncé "needs no distractions from her singing, which can be airy or brassy, tearful or vicious, rapid-fire with staccato syllables or sustained in curlicued melismas. But she was in constant motion, strutting in costumes". She performed a similar arrangement at the Los Angeles Staples Center on September 2, 2007. She was dressed in a belly-dancing outfit, and the performance was executed with several male backup dancers and live instrumentation. Beyoncé reproduced the dance routine she performed in the song's music video. When Beyoncé performed "Baby Boy" in Sunrise, Florida, on June 29, 2009, she wore a glittery gold leotard. As her performance began, she was suspended in the air and then lowered to the B-stage, where she sang "Baby Boy" with an excerpt from Dawn Penn's "You Don't Love Me (No, No, No)". Animated graphics of turntables, faders, and other club equipment were projected behind the dancers and musicians. Beyoncé was accompanied by her backing band, Suga Mama, which consisted of two drummers, two keyboardists, a percussionist, a horn section, three imposing backup vocalists, and lead guitarist Bibi McGill. "Baby Boy" was included on her live album The Beyoncé Experience Live (2007), and the deluxe edition of I Am... World Tour (2010). At the 2005 ASCAP Pop Music Awards, "Baby Boy", along with Beyoncé's two other singles from Dangerously in Love—"Me, Myself and I" and "Naughty Girl"—was recognized as one of the most performed songs of 2004.

"Baby Boy" was performed by Beyoncé in a pink fringe dress at a concert at Palais Nikaïa in Nice, France, on June 20, 2011, and at her headlining Glastonbury Festival performance on June 26, 2011, where she brought out English trip hop singer Tricky to guest on the song. Between May 25 and 28, 2012, Beyoncé performed the song during her Revel Presents: Beyoncé Live revue at Revel Atlantic City, New Jersey. Jim Farber of the Daily News wrote: "The first, and last parts of the show stressed the steeliest Beyoncé, told in bold songs... [like] dancehall-inflected 'Baby Boy.'" On February 3, 2013, Beyoncé performed the song during the Super Bowl XLVII halftime show. In 2013, Beyoncé performed "Baby Boy" as a medley with "Get Me Bodied" during her The Mrs. Carter Show World Tour (2013–2014), while the songs were performed separately in 2014. The song was also performed during The Formation World Tour (2016). She performed the song during both of her co-headlining On the Run (2014) and On the Run II (2018) all-stadium tours with her husband Jay-Z. In 2018, during the OTR II tour, the song was combined with "Mundian To Bach Ke".

== Track listings and formats ==
"Baby Boy" – 12-inch single
No.	Title	Length
1.	"Baby Boy" (Album version) (featuring Sean Paul)	4:04
2.	"Baby Boy" (Junior Vasquez Club Anthem Remix) (featuring Sean Paul)	8:50
3.	"Baby Boy" (Maurice's Nu Soul Mix) (featuring Sean Paul)	6:14
4.	"Baby Boy" (Maurice's Nu Dub Baby!) (featuring Sean Paul)	6:30
Total length:		25:38

"Baby Boy" – Digital EP
No.	Title	Length
1.	"Baby Boy" (featuring Sean Paul)	4:06
2.	"Baby Boy" (Instrumental)	4:04
3.	"Summertime" (Remix) (featuring Ghostface Killah)	4:05
Total length:		12:15

"Baby Boy" – German CD single
No.	Title	Length
1.	"Baby Boy" (Album version) (featuring Sean Paul)	4:04
2.	"Baby Boy" (Junior's Padapella) (featuring Sean Paul)	3:58
Total length:		8:02

"Baby Boy" – European maxi single
No.	Title	Length
1.	"Baby Boy" (Album version) (featuring Sean Paul)	4:04
2.	"Baby Boy" (Maurice's Nu Soul Mix) (featuring Sean Paul)	8:50
3.	"Baby Boy" (Junior's Padapella) (featuring Sean Paul)	3:58
4.	"Krazy in Luv" (Adam 12 So Crazy Remix) (featuring Jay-Z))	4:30
Total length:		18:06

== Charts ==
=== Weekly charts ===
Weekly chart performance for "Baby Boy"
Chart (2003–2004)	Peak position
Australia (ARIA)	3
Australian Urban (ARIA)	1
Austria (Ö3 Austria Top 40)	18
Belgium (Ultratop 50 Flanders)	11
Belgium (Ultratop 50 Wallonia)	7
Canada (Nielsen SoundScan)	2
Canada CHR (Nielsen BDS)	1
Croatia International Airplay (HRT)	6
Denmark (Tracklisten)	6
Europe (European Hot 100 Singles)	3
France (SNEP)	8
France Radio Chart (SNEP)	1
Germany (GfK)	4
Greece (IFPI)	11
Hungary (Dance Top 40)	3
Hungary (Single Top 40)	3
Ireland (IRMA)	6
Italy (FIMI)	12
Netherlands (Dutch Top 40)	8
Netherlands (Single Top 100)	11
New Zealand (Recorded Music NZ)	2
Norway (VG-lista)	10
Scottish Singles Sales (Official Charts)	9
Spain (Promusicae)	8
Sweden (Sverigetopplistan)	5
Switzerland (Schweizer Hitparade)	5
UK Singles (Official Charts)	2
UK Hip Hop/R&B (Official Charts)	2
US Billboard Hot 100	1
US Dance Club Play (Billboard)	2
US Dance Airplay (Billboard)	1
US Hot R&B/Hip-Hop Songs (Billboard)	1
US Mainstream Top 40 (Billboard)	1
US Rhythmic Top 40 (Billboard)	1

=== Year-end charts ===
2003 year-end chart performance for "Baby Boy"
Chart (2003)	Position
Australia (ARIA)	32
Australian Urban (ARIA)	16
Belgium (Ultratop 50 Flanders)	77
Belgium (Ultratop 50 Wallonia)	83
Germany (Media Control GfK)	67
Ireland (IRMA)	90
Netherlands (Dutch Top 40)	74
Sweden (Hitlistan)	54
Switzerland (Schweizer Hitparade)	29
UK Singles (OCC)	97
UK Urban (Music Week)	27
US Billboard Hot 100	12
US Hot R&B/Hip Hop Singles & Tracks (Billboard)	16
US Mainstream Top 40 (Billboard)	32
US Rhythmic Top 40 (Billboard)	13
US Top 40 Tracks (Billboard)	14

2004 year-end chart performance for "Baby Boy"
Chart (2004)	Position
Australian Urban (ARIA)	35
US Billboard Hot 100	69

=== Decade-end charts ===
Decade-end chart performance for "Baby Boy"
Chart (2000–2009)	Position
US Billboard Hot 100	38

== Certifications ==
Certifications and sales for "Baby Boy"
Region	Certification	Certified units/sales
Australia (ARIA)	3× Platinum	210,000^{‡}
Brazil (Pro-Música Brasil)	Gold	30,000^{‡}
Canada (Music Canada)	Platinum	80,000^{‡}
Denmark (IFPI Danmark)	Gold	45,000^{‡}
Germany (BVMI)	Gold	150,000^{‡}
New Zealand (RMNZ)	2× Platinum	60,000^{‡}
United Kingdom (BPI)	Platinum	600,000^{‡}
United States (RIAA)	2× Platinum	2,000,000^{‡}
United States (RIAA) Mastertone	Platinum	1,000,000^{*}
^{*} Sales figures based on certification alone.^{‡} Sales+streaming figures based on certification alone.

== Release history ==
Release dates and formats for "Baby Boy"
Region	Date	Format(s)	Label(s)	Ref.
United States	August 3, 2003	Contemporary hit radio; rhythmic contemporary radio	Columbia	
France	September 15, 2003	Maxi CD	Sony Music	
Australia	October 6, 2003	Maxi CD	Sony Music	
Brazil	October 6, 2003	Digital download (EP)	Sony Music	
France	October 6, 2003	12-inch vinyl	Sony Music	
Germany	October 6, 2003	CD; maxi CD	Sony Music	
United Kingdom	October 6, 2003	12-inch vinyl; two maxi CDs	Columbia	
United States	October 14, 2003	12-inch vinyl	Columbia; Music World	
France	November 10, 2003	CD	Sony Music	
