= Beyoncé 2011 Glastonbury performance =

Beyoncé concert

Beyoncé at Glastonbury 2011
- Concert by Beyoncé
- Location: Worthy Farm, Pilton, Somerset, England
- Venue: Pyramid Stage (2011 Glastonbury Festival)
- Date: June 26, 2011
- Attendance: 175,000

American singer Beyoncé headlined the 2011 Glastonbury Festival alongside acts U2 and Coldplay, performing on June 26, 2011 at the Pyramid Stage in Pilton, Somerset, England. She was the first solo Black woman to headline the Pyramid Stage (Musician Skin with rock band Skunk Anansie was the first Black female-fronted band to headline Pyramid Stage in 1999, while Puma Jones, as a vocalist with Black Uhuru, was the first Black woman to perform on the Pyramid Stage in 1984), and Beyoncé also became the first solo female artist to headline the festival since Sinéad O'Connor in 1990 (Kylie Minogue was selected to headline in 2004, but was forced to cancel her performance due to a breast cancer diagnosis). While her festival headline announcement was initially met with skepticism from rock and indie music purists who considered the placement "a little too pop" for the festival, Beyoncé's performance was immediately met with critical acclaim, heralded by The Daily Telegraph as a "sassy triumph", "career-defining" by Billboard, and by others in the media as a "masterpiece", "killer", and "90 minutes of pure Bey greatness." The performance, which acted as the festival finale, generated over 2.6 million views individually, breaking the record at the time for most television views for a single performance.

== Production ==
=== Background and development ===
Beyoncé was inspired by her husband's controversial 2008 Glastonbury performance, which broke ground as the first rap headline in the festival's then 38-year history. It was also mentioned by Glastonbury co-organiser Emily Eavis in an interview that Coldplay lead singer and close friend Chris Martin helped convince Beyoncé to perform, securing Beyoncé for the final headline slot. Beyoncé was announced as the Sunday headliner on February 10, 2011 in Billboard with the following statement: “This really is the biggest festival in the world and I cannot wait to perform there. Everyone who attends is really appreciative of music and is in such a good mood that entire weekend... I’m pumped just thinking about that huge audience and soaking up their energy.” “I’ve been there behind the scenes and I had the time of my life. I hope it rains. I want it muddy. I want to ditch the heels and put on my wellies. I just want to make sure that I deliver. I’m sure it’ll be one of those memories I’ll take with me to my grave.”

Leading up to the performance, it was believed by BBC that Beyoncé and her team had spent three weeks at a London rehearsal studio to prepare, with her Destiny's Child bandmates Kelly Rowland and Michelle Williams rumored to appear. Beyoncé was subsequently announced as a performer on the 2011 BET Awards in the weeks leading up to the Glastonbury performance, and a portion of her performance ("Best Thing I Never Had" and "End of Time") was sent via satellite, airing simultaneously that evening in North America.

Beyoncé decided on including Bristol rapper Tricky (the only featured guest) after he was mentioned by one of her choreographers. In a 2013 interview with NME, Tricky said, “[Beyoncé’s] got a guy who does her choreogra-lalalala. What’s it called? The dancing stuff. She was in England and she wanted somebody to do a feature. He mentioned me... He mentioned me so she said OK." In a subsequent interview with publication Vice, he further explained, “I was shocked to be honest with you, when I got the phone call saying Beyoncé wants you to feature. Because I’m banned from Glastonbury, I can’t play there. I’m banned from all Live Nation events. But Beyoncé wanted me there so they said I could. Shows she’s got some muscle."

Jay-Z was also present (watching from the barricades at the front of the stage), but did not make a guest appearance as initially rumored.

== Set list ==
Interviewed by BBC, Knowles mentioned that she sent close friend and co-headliner Chris Martin of Coldplay her set list in advance: "I made sure he approved it. He's the master of this". She also reportedly sought advice from friend Gwyneth Paltrow and co-headliner U2 as well. Knowles' performance promoted the recent release of her fourth solo studio album 4 (2011) as all four pre-released tracks (lead single "Run The World (Girls)", promotional single "1+1", international second single "Best Thing I Never Had", and leaked song "End of Time") received setlist placements. The following songs were performed:

1. "Crazy in Love" (contains elements of The Beatles "Come Together")
2. "Single Ladies (Put a Ring on It)"
3. "Naughty Girl"
4. "Baby Boy" (featuring Tricky)
5. "Happy Birthday"
6. "Best Thing I Never Had"
7. "End of Time"
8. "If I Were a Boy" (contains elements of Alanis Morissette "You Oughta Know")
9. "Sweet Dreams" (contains elements of Eurythmics "Sweet Dreams (Are Made of This)")
10. "Why Don't You Love Me?"
11. "Love Hangover" (performed by backing vocalists "The Mamas")
12. "The Beautiful Ones"
13. "Sex on Fire"
14. "1+1"
15. "Irreplaceable"
16. "Independent Women Part I"
17. "Bootylicious"
18. "Bug a Boo"
19. "Telephone"
20. "Say My Name"
21. "Jumpin', Jumpin'"
22. "Survivor"
23. "At Last"
24. "Run the World (Girls)"
25. "Halo"

Notes

- Both "Best Thing I Never Had" and "End Of Time" were simultaneously broadcast (via satellite) to the 2011 BET Awards.

== Critical response ==
“Somebody asked if I wanted to do it and convinced me I should. I met her beforehand and I thought she’d be more Beyoncé, but she was like the girl next door – really normal and a proper workhorse, rehearsing all day. I froze onstage, because I usually perform in near darkness, but this was bright fucking fireworks and all sorts of shit going on. She saw me and came over and started dancing with me. So professional. I’m shy. I’m sometimes not very good around big successful people. We don’t hang out any more.”

— Tricky interviewed by Dave Simpson for The Guardian article "Tricky: ‘I was less nervous going to prison than I was getting on stage’" (2023)

The performance was met with universal acclaim. Rolling Stone described the performance as a "bold, crowd-pleasing spectacle." Elle opined that "few forces of nature could compel the Elle team to slog through miles of mud at midnight. Last night, that force was Beyoncé, who took to Glastonbury's Pyramid Stage in all her big-haired, gold-spangled glory for a set that felt like a master class in how to seduce 100,000 people." The Times described the performance as "blowing the festival apart", and subsequently lauded "a star at the height of her powers, beating the audience into submission with sheer professionalism and interstellar glamour." The Huffington Post was "wowed", stating that "following this performance, she'll be in the dreams of thousands of British music fans for a long time to come." NME rated the performance an 8/10, giving praise to the "epic-sounding" newer songs, as well as her "career-spanning biggies". Music Radar mentioned that Knowles' set was "easily the most all-out pop thing the festival had ever seen", but called the performance an "undeniable success" and also praised "her incredibly tight, all-female backing band."

David Riedel of CBS News considered her "nearly universally-praised" performance "a knockout", "clos[ing] Glastonbury with a bang". Thomas Green of The Arts Desk concluded that "[He] saw many riveting gigs... but best by a country mile was Beyoncé at Glastonbury who quite simply lit up the festival's Sunday night with fireworks, showmanship and explosive party spirit." Rory Gibb from now-defunct publication Drowned in Sound called the performance "electrifying", noting that "It’s tough not to suspect that Beyonce’s Sunday night would always have ended up the weekend’s highlight, but despite being predictably brilliant its slickness and seamless sense of drama is still a pleasant surprise. It probably shouldn’t have been; as one of the biggest stars in the music world, and one whose live appearances tend to be accomplished by a full show, she always seemed a neat fit for the Pyramid Stage headline slot." Standard.co.uk mentioned that "Glastonbury fell 'Crazy In Love' with Beyoncé as the American superstar brought the festival to a close in "unforgettable" fashion." Other publications lauded her "dazzling" style and fashion choices, with UK Magazine Stylist further mentioning that she brought "Glastonbury 2011 to a rapturous close with a spectacular performance."

Various publications were also surprised to see Tricky on stage with Beyonce, with reception of the choice varying from "bizarre", to coverage noting "microphone technical difficulties" and apparent "stage fright", to being included on BBC's 10 of the best Glastonbury guests (of the last decade) list.

Following her performance, fellow artist George Michael tweeted, “Just watching Beyonce’s performance at Glastonbury. I love that woman. Great artist, writer, singer, person … Something so generous about the fact that she covered songs that acknowledged Glastonbury’s typical audience. Very few American artists … would take the time or have the respect for a foreign audience to do that. She just gets better and better.”

=== Chart response ===
The appearance, coupled with her simultaneous BET Awards appearance, strengthened the performance of Knowles' then-2-day-old album 4, boosting album numbers in the United Kingdom to three times her closest competitors, as well as bolstering attention for current single "Best Thing I Never Had", various "4" album songs, and her Destiny's Child-infused overall catalog. 7 tracks appeared from Knowles in the Official Charts Company Top 75.

== Legacy ==
“I’m kicking off tonight with Beyoncé’s 2011 headline set; Guardian music editor Ben Beaumont-Thomas will be here tomorrow to liveblog Adele; and then I’ll be back on Sunday night to liveblog David Bowie’s epochal 2000 set. I saw both the shows I’m liveblogging from the field itself, so it will be interesting to revisit them. I’ve also got another distinction, if you can call it that, when it comes to Beyoncé – I’ve interviewed her, and not once, but twice, both as a member of Destiny’s Child... Ten years later and Beyoncé was a Glastonbury-headlining superstar, though still very much developing as an artist. The triumphs of her fifth visual album and Lemonade were ahead of her, along with the political awakening which brought about such stunning moments as her Black Power-infused performance of "Formation" at the 2016 Super Bowl. Yet she still had songs as great as "Crazy in Love" in her arsenal. I remember the show being front-loaded with hits, boiling hot, and a true Glastonbury moment.”

— Alex Needham in The Guardian liveblogging article "Glastonbury has been cancelled, so BBC Two is showing classic headline sets all weekend. We rewatched Beyoncé’s incredible 2011 set" (2020)

Several publications noted an ascension in Knowles' capabilities as a live performer as a result of the performance, while others observed the polarized attitude of the UK music establishment in response to a Black woman performing on the same stages and to the same crowd sizes that were past reserved for legacy rock acts. Later revealed to be secretly pregnant with her first child at the time, several retrospective reviews from publications also highlighted her strength, stamina, and "cleverly designed" clothing choices.

The Independent touted her performance as the "13th Greatest Glastonbury Performance of All-Time" in a June 2023 article. Billboard included the performance in an unranked, 2015 "Top 10 Glastonbury Moments of All Time" list, lauding her for "clos[ing] the Pyramid Stage "in grand fashion", as well as performing while secretly pregnant.

As a result of the COVID-19 pandemic, the 2020 edition of the festival was cancelled, and Knowles' 2011 performance was televised on BBC for a second time (BBC Two, BBC Four, and a new digital channel on BBC iPlayer) as a component of their 60-act virtual line-up from June 25 to June 29, causing a resurgence in acclaim for the performance.

In a 2020 unranked "Glastonbury's 50 Greatest Moments" retrospective from The Guardian, writer Ben Beaumont-Thomas lauded "Beyoncé’s Vegas-style revue of a set, straddling power ballads, Prince and Etta James covers, a six-song Destiny’s Child medley and a version of Kings of Leon’s "Sex on Fire", [which] saw her make sure every single person in the 100,000-strong audience was having a good time. They responded with remarkable vocal dexterity in a raucous rendition of "Irreplaceable"." Similarly, in a 2021 "10 of the best Glastonbury sets ever" retrospective from the same publication, writer Dorian Lynskey stated, "Beyoncé was imperial from the moment she opened with "Crazy in Love" and fireworks. Her glamorous spectacle, studded with savvy cover versions, permanently reset expectations of what a Glastonbury headline set could be."

The success of Knowles' performance also ushered in the festival slot placement of several other prominent female pop or R&B acts in subsequent years, including headliners Adele (2016) and Billie Eilish (2022), as well as other notable performers Mary J. Blige (2015), Katy Perry (2017), Dua Lipa (2017), Miley Cyrus (2019), Janet Jackson (2019), Megan Thee Stallion (2022), and Olivia Rodrigo (2022), among others.

In June 2024, SZA followed Beyoncé as only the second Black woman to headline Glastonbury solo.
