= Chloe x Halle discography =

Discography

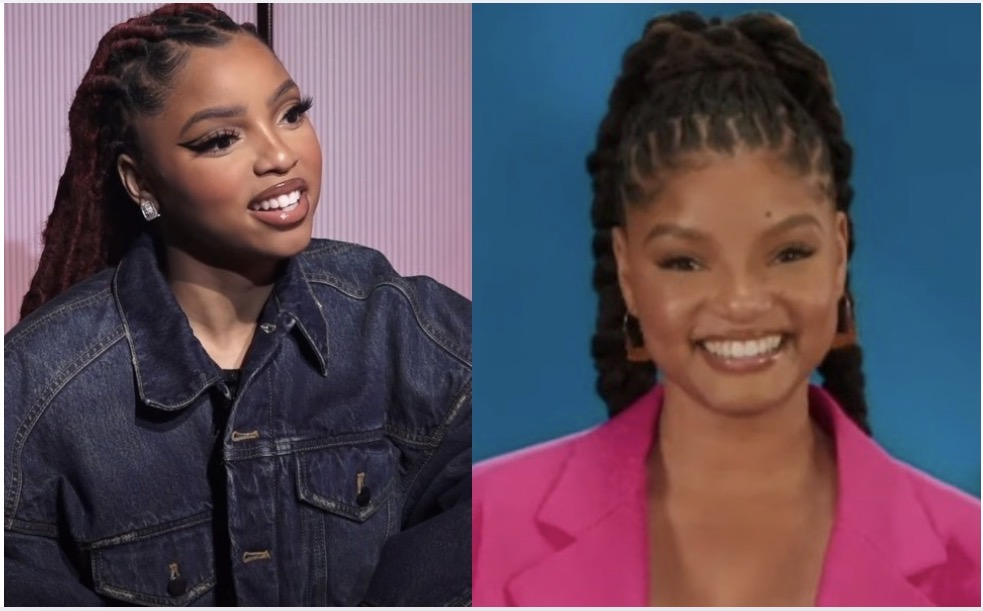
- Chloe (left) and Halle Bailey (right)
- Studio albums: 2
- EPs: 3
- Singles: 9
- Music videos: 13
- Mixtapes: 1

American R&B duo Chloe x Halle have released two studio albums, three extended plays, one mixtape, 9 singles and 13 music videos.

== Albums ==
=== Studio albums ===
List of studio album(s), with selected chart positions and details
Title	Album details	Peak chart positions							
Title	Album details	US	US R&B /HH	US R&B	BEL (FL)	CAN	FRA	UK	UK R&B
The Kids Are Alright	Released : March 23, 2018; Label: Parkwood, Columbia; Format: CD, Digital download, streaming	139	—	19	—	—	—	—	—
Ungodly Hour	Released: June 12, 2020; Label: Parkwood, Columbia; Format: Digital download, LP, streaming	16	11	2	160	71	200	80	11
"—" denotes a recording that did not chart or was not released in that territory.

=== Mixtapes ===
List of mixtape(s), with selected details
Title	Details
The Two of Us	Released: March 16, 2017; Label: Parkwood, Columbia; Format: Digital download

== Extended plays ==
List of extended play(s), with selected details
Title	Details
Uncovered	Released: September 23, 2013; Label: ADED.US; Format: Digital download
Sugar Symphony	Released: April 29, 2016; Label: Parkwood, Columbia; Format: Digital download
Spotify Singles (Note: A live EP recorded exclusively for Spotify.)	Released: November 20, 2020; Label: Parkwood, Columbia; Format: Streaming

== Singles ==
=== As lead artist ===
List of single(s), with selected chart positions and certifications, showing year released and album name
Title	Year	Peak chart positions					Certifications	Album
Title	Year	US	US R&B /HH	US R&B/HH Airplay	US Rhy.	NZ Hot	Certifications	Album
"Drop"	2016	—	—	—	—	—		Sugar Symphony
"Fall"	2016	—	—	—	—	—		Sugar Symphony
"Grown" (from Grown-ish)	2018	—	—	—	—	—		The Kids Are Alright
"The Kids Are Alright"	2018	—	—	—	—	—		The Kids Are Alright
"Happy Without Me" (featuring Joey Bada$$)	2018	—	—	—	—	—		The Kids Are Alright
"Catch Up" (with Swae Lee featuring Mike Will Made It)	2020	—	—	—	—	—		Ungodly Hour
"Do It" (solo or remix with Doja Cat featuring City Girls and Latto)	2020	63	23	6	17	20	RIAA: Platinum	Ungodly Hour
"Forgive Me"	2020	— (Note: "Forgive Me" did not enter on the Billboard Hot 100, but peaked at number seven on the Bubbling Under Hot 100 chart.)	—	10	—	28		Ungodly Hour
"All I Think About on Christmas"	2026	—	—	—	—	—		Non-album single
"—" denotes items which were not released in that country or failed to chart.

=== As featured artist ===
List of single(s) as featured artist, showing year released and album name
Title	Year	Album
"This Is for My Girls" (with Artists for Let Girls Learn)	2016	Non-album single

=== Promotional singles ===
List of promotional single(s), showing year released and album name
Title	Year	Album
"I Say So"	2017	Non-album singles
"Who Knew" (from Grown-ish)	2019	Non-album singles
"Thinkin Bout Me" (from Grown-ish)	2019	Non-album singles

== Guest appearances ==
List of non-single guest appearance(s), showing year released, other performing artist(s), and album name
Title	Year	Other artist(s)	Album
"Unstoppable"	2013	None	Austin & Ally: Turn It Up
"Lonely Road"	2017	Willow Smith	The 1st
"Bougie Party"	2017	None	Dear White People
"Warrior"	2018	None	A Wrinkle in Time
"Shine Bright"	2018	None	Trolls: Original Motion Picture Soundtrack
"Be Yourself"	2019	None	Little
"Wolf at Your Door"	2019	None	For the Throne: Music Inspired by the HBO Series Game of Thrones
"Enchanted"	2019	None	El Camino: A Breaking Bad Movie — Original Soundtrack
"Silver Bells"	2019	Dionne Warwick	Dionne Warwick & the Voices of Christmas
"To Love Somebody"	2024	None	Non-album song
"Want Me"	2024	None	Trouble in Paradise
"Soft" (Unlocked)	2024	Flo	Access All Areas: Unlocked
"So I Can Feel Again"	2025	None	Love?... or Something Like It
