= Ungodly Hour =

2020 studio album by Chloe x Halle

- Standard cover

Studio album by Chloe x Halle
- Released: June 12, 2020
- Recorded: December 2018 – October 2019
- Studio: Chloe x Halle's home studio (Los Angeles)
- Genres: R&B; pop; hip hop soul
- Length: 37:17
- Labels: Parkwood; Columbia
- Producers: Avedon; Asoteric; Chlöe; Halle Bailey; Boi-1da; Disclosure; Felicia Ferraro; Gitty; Wallis Lane; Mike Will Made It; Bregma; Nasri; Jake One; Pluss; Royal Z; Sounwave; Scott Storch; Jahaan Sweet; Vinylz

Chloe x Halle chronology
The Kids Are Alright (2018)	Ungodly Hour (2020)

Singles from Ungodly Hour
- 1. "Catch Up" Released: April 16, 2020; 2. "Do It" Released: May 14, 2020; 3. "Forgive Me" Released: June 12, 2020; 4. "Ungodly Hour" Released: February 25, 2021

Ungodly Hour is the second studio album by American duo Chloe x Halle. It was released on June 12, 2020, by Parkwood Entertainment and Columbia. Originally scheduled for release on June 5, the album's release was delayed as a gesture of solidarity with the Black Lives Matter movement and the global protests following the murder of George Floyd. The album was supported by the singles "Do It", "Catch Up", and "Forgive Me", the former of which became their most successful song to date. A reissue of the album "Chrome Edition" was released on February 26, 2021.

Upon its release, Ungodly Hour received widespread acclaim from music critics, with many praising the album's cohesiveness and complimenting the duo's vocal delivery, artistic growth and maturity. It also featured on various year-end lists and received a nomination for Best Progressive R&B Album at the 63rd Annual Grammy Awards, along with nominations for Best Traditional R&B Performance for "Wonder What She Thinks of Me", and Best R&B Song for "Do It". The album debuted at number 16 on the Billboard 200 chart with 24,000 album-equivalent units, marking the duo's highest-charting album.

== Background and recording ==
In March 2018, Chloe x Halle released their debut studio album, The Kids Are Alright, which earned them nominations for two Grammy Awards, Best Urban Contemporary Album and Best New Artist. Much like The Kids Are Alright, which was recorded entirely in their family living room in Los Angeles, most of Ungodly Hour was recorded in the duo's household parking garage, which they had converted into a home studio. Chloe was the primary producer of the record and was inspired by "90s music and early 2000s production" during the creative process. The sisters executively produced the entire record with help from Beyoncé who had previously discovered, mentored, and signed them to her label Parkwood Entertainment. It also features production from Sounwave, Jake One, Scott Storch, Avedon, Disclosure, Jeff Gitelman, Nasri, Mike Will Made It, Pluss, Royal Z, Asoteric, Boi-1da and Vinylz, as well as songwriting from prominent songwriters Nija Charles and Victoria Monét.

Recording sessions for Ungodly Hour concluded in October 2019, and filming of its music videos concluded in November. The duo made use of mood boards during the brainstorming phase of their creative process. The duo co-wrote all thirteen of the tracks on Ungodly Hour, with Chloe helping produce ten of those tracks. Chloe told Women's Wear Daily, "It was really collaborative. But we still executive produced it. We had our hands in everything on this album." They also revealed to NPR that creative control was paramount in their work ethic for the album.

== Composition ==
Ungodly Hour is an R&B, pop, and hip hop soul record which contains elements of trap, soul, hip hop, blues, acoustic pop, UK garage, doo-wop, gospel, jazz, techno, indie rock, and sophisti-pop. Shahzaib Hussain of Clash describes the album as "the spiritual companion piece to their debut", and that it is a "cohesive, complete listen". Nick Levine of BBC Culture stated the album "offers modern R&B at its most sleek and serene".

== Concept and themes ==
Most tracks on Ungodly Hour are about "navigating messy situations — sometimes ones that you have caused." The concept of the album has a constant message of being completely unapologetic about one's true self. The thirty-second album opener "Intro" contains the lyric "Don't ever ask for permission, ask for forgiveness", before immediately leading into the track "Forgive Me". This song in particular pushes the aforementioned message, and also drives a "sorry, not sorry" attitude while giving "a proverbial middle finger up to the lovers they've spurned". The track "Baby Girl" was noted by critics for its female empowerment elements and for "reconciling the vulnerability of womanhood with the angst of their younger, more impressionable selves."

In an interview with Zane Lowe for Apple Music on BBC Radio 1, Chloe said that the duo "really just wanted to show how we could pair [their] musicianship with a few bops and letting people enjoy themselves." The duo developed the title Ungodly Hour while writing the lead single "Do It". Halle revealed that they gave the record this name because "it's okay to not be perfect all the time. We wanted to challenge the idea of us being these perfect angels that everybody has this image of us in their head." In another interview with NPR, Halle also said she felt that "during [the 'ungodly hour'], there can be a lot of things going on through your head" and that a person may think of all the insecurities or ups and downs they may have in life, hence why in the title track they sing the lyric: "When you decide you like yourself, and you need someone in your life, love me at the ungodly hour. Love me at my best and my worst."

== Release and promotion ==
On December 4, 2019, the duo announced the name of the album and performed the unreleased songs "Do It" and "ROYL" during a standalone performance at The Fonda Theatre in Los Angeles. In April 2020, Chloe x Halle posted various clues and lyrics on social media to tease the single "Catch Up" with Swae Lee featuring Mike Will Made It, which was later released on April 16. On May 14, 2020, Chloe x Halle announced the album and revealed its artwork and release date of June 5 via social media. With this announcement, the second single "Do It" was released, and would later earn Chloe x Halle their first entry on the Billboard Hot 100 at number 83. The track would go on to peak at number 63. The duo revealed the tracklist via social media on May 28, and on June 2 postponed the release of the album by a week as a gesture of solidarity with the Black Lives Matter movement and the global protests following the murder of George Floyd. Ungodly Hour was released on June 12, 2020, alongside the release of the music video for its third single "Forgive Me". In early September 2020, Chloe x Halle released a remix of their single "Do It" featuring Doja Cat, City Girls and Mulatto. The single was shortly certified gold by the Recording Industry Association of America, becoming the duo's first-ever certification in their career.

On February 24, 2021, Chloe x Halle went on The Tonight Show Starring Jimmy Fallon to announce the release of the Ungodly Hour (Chrome Edition). A music video for the album's title track was released on the same evening. The reissue was released on February 26, 2021, alongside a first time vinyl release and includes two new songs.

=== Live performances ===
Throughout 2020, Chloe x Halle engaged in a number of performances to promote the album and its tracks. On June 16, 2020, the duo performed "Do It" on the Today show. On June 29, the duo performed "Forgive Me" and "Do It" at the BET Awards. They performed "Do It" at the 31st GLAAD Media Awards in late July, as well as at the Dear Class of 2020 virtual commencement event in early June 2020. In late June 2020, they performed "ROYL" at Global Citizen's Global Goal: Unite for Our Future concert event. In August 2020, the duo performed "Do It" on Jimmy Kimmel Live!. On August 30, the duo performed "Do It", "Busy Boy" and "Forgive Me" at the 2020 US Open. On the same day, they also performed the title track, "Ungodly Hour", during the pre-show for the 2020 MTV Video Music Awards. In October 2020, the duo performed the songs "Tipsy", "Do It", "Ungodly Hour" and "Forgive Me" at BBC's annual 1Xtra Live event. They also performed the songs "Forgive Me", "Do It", "Busy Boy" and "Ungodly Hour" at Pepsi's Unmute Your Voice concert to encourage voting during the 2020 presidential election. On November 15, the duo performed the album's title track once again at the 46th People's Choice Awards. The duo performed the songs "Don't Make It Harder on Me", "Baby Girl", "Do It", "Ungodly Hour" and "Wonder What She Thinks of Me" at their NPR Tiny Desk Concert in December 2020. They also performed "Baby Girl" at the 2020 Billboard Women in Music ceremony. On December 22, they performed "Overwhelmed", "Do It", "Baby Girl", "Ungodly Hour", "Tipsy", "Forgive Me", and "Don't Make It Harder On Me" live at the Verizon Up exclusive for members virtual concert. On December 30, the sister-duo performed a rendition of "Don't Make It Harder on Me" on the Honda Stage. "Do It" was performed by the duo during NBC's New Year's Eve 2021 special on December 31, 2020.

== Critical reception ==
Professional ratings
Aggregate scores
Source	Rating
AnyDecentMusic?	7.5/10
Metacritic	81/100
Review scores
Source	Rating
AllMusic	4/5 stars
Clash	8.0/10
The Daily Telegraph	4/5 stars
Entertainment Weekly	B+
The Guardian	4/5 stars
The Line of Best Fit	9.0/10
Our Culture Mag	4/5 stars
Pitchfork	7.7/10
Rolling Stone	3.5/5 stars

The album received critical acclaim, with critics praising their vocal delivery, artistic growth, maturity, and the album's cohesiveness. At Metacritic, which assigns a normalized rating out of 100 to reviews from mainstream publications, the album received an average score of 81 based on 9 sources, indicating "universal acclaim".

Shahzaib Hussain of Clash stated that the album "lacks some of the DIY spirit of their earlier efforts, but benefits from navigating the trails of playability and experimentation". He praised the fact that the album "doesn't adhere to good-girl-gone-bad tropes, that age-old changeover from wide-eyed teen sensations to risqué provocateurs" and that the pair's vocals and harmonies elevated the more mundane tracks, concluding that the album "is a soothing salve for a world on fire. It's an avowal of sisterhood and sorority, a projection of a generation of young black women galvanized by a collective willingness to enact efficacious change in the face of adversity." Rachel Aroesti of The Guardian said the pair match "sumptuous harmonies with intricate beats" and that the listener's attention was drawn to the album's details and "the slow-burn appeal of the pair's vocal melodies, which are habitually inventive, ornate and hauntingly beautiful".

Comparing the album to the act's previous release, Andy Kellman from AllMusic claimed "the Baileys' second album is really a refinement of and progression from The Kids Are Alright. Its pop-R&B foundation is a little slicker, still tricked out with the occasional trap-styled production techniques—probing bass, rattling percussion—twisted just enough to not sound overdone."

=== Year-end lists ===
Ungodly Hour appeared on many year-end best-of lists of 2020 ranked by critics and publications.

Select year-end (2020) rankings of Ungodly Hour
Publication	List	Rank	Ref.
The A.V. Club	The 20 best albums of 2020	5	
Billboard	The 10 Best R&B Albums of 2020	5	
Billboard	The 50 Best Albums of 2020	17	
Clash	Clash Albums Of The Year 2020	1	
The Guardian	The 50 best albums of 2020	12	
The Line of Best Fit	The Best Albums of 2020 Ranked	9	
NPR	The 50 Best Albums of 2020	23	
Pitchfork	The 50 Best Albums of 2020	28	
Rated R&B	The 30 Best R&B Albums of 2020	3	
Rolling Stone	The 50 Best Albums of 2020	19	
Time	The 10 Best Albums of 2020	2	

== Awards and nominations ==
At the 63rd Annual Grammy Awards, Ungodly Hour and its tracks received three nominations: The album was nominated for Best Progressive R&B Album, its lead single, "Do It", was nominated for Best R&B Song, while "Wonder What She Thinks of Me" was nominated for Best Traditional R&B Performance.

Ungodly Hour awards and nominations
Year	Award	Category	Result	Ref.
2020	Soul Train Music Awards	Album of the Year	Nominated	
2021	Grammy Awards	Best Progressive R&B Album	Nominated	
2021	BET Awards	Album of the Year	Nominated	

== Commercial performance ==
Ungodly Hour debuted at number 16 on the Billboard 200 chart with 24,000 units sold. It peaked at number 80 on the UK Albums chart, number 11 on the UK R&B Albums chart, number 160 on the Belgian Albums chart, and number 200 on the French Albums chart.

== Track listing ==
Ungodly Hour
No.	Title	Lyrics	Music	Producer(s)	Length
1.	"Intro"	Chloe Bailey; Halle Bailey	C. Bailey; H. Bailey	C. Bailey	0:28
2.	"Forgive Me"	C. Bailey; H. Bailey; Nija Charles; India Perkins	C. Bailey; H. Bailey; Mark Spears	C. Bailey; Sounwave; Jake One^{[b]}	2:38
3.	"Baby Girl"	C. Bailey; H. Bailey	C. Bailey; H. Bailey	C. Bailey	3:32
4.	"Do It"	C. Bailey; H. Bailey; Victoria Monét	C. Bailey; Scott Storch; Vincent van den Ende; Anton Kuehl-Joergensen	C. Bailey; Storch; Avedon^{[a]}; Asoteric^{[a]}	2:56
5.	"Tipsy"	C. Bailey; H. Bailey	C. Bailey; H. Bailey	C. Bailey	2:33
6.	"Ungodly Hour"	C. Bailey; H. Bailey	H. Bailey; Guy Lawrence; Howard Lawrence	H. Bailey; Disclosure	4:16
7.	"Busy Boy"	C. Bailey; H. Bailey	C. Bailey; Jeff Gitelman; Nasri Atweh	C. Bailey; Gitty; Nasri	3:10
8.	"Catch Up" (with Swae Lee featuring Mike Will Made It)	C. Bailey; H. Bailey; Khalif Brown	C. Bailey; Michael Williams II; Asheton Hogan; Adam Waldman	C. Bailey; Mike Will Made It; Pluss; Royal Z	3:04
9.	"Overwhelmed"	C. Bailey; H. Bailey	C. Bailey; H. Bailey	C. Bailey	0:52
10.	"Lonely"	C. Bailey; H. Bailey	C. Bailey; Storch; van den Ende; Paimon Jahanbin; Nima Jahanbin; Felicia Ferraro	C. Bailey; H. Bailey; Storch; Avedon	3:15
11.	"Don't Make It Harder on Me"	C. Bailey; H. Bailey	C. Bailey; Atweh; Gitelman	C. Bailey; Nasri; Gitty	3:35
12.	"Wonder What She Thinks of Me"	C. Bailey; H. Bailey	C. Bailey; H. Bailey	C. Bailey; H. Bailey	3:32
13.	"ROYL"	C. Bailey; H. Bailey	C. Bailey; H. Bailey; Matthew Samuels; Anderson Hernandez; Jahaan Sweet	C. Bailey; H. Bailey; Boi-1da; Vinylz; Sweet	3:25
Total length:					37:17

Ungodly Hour (Chrome Edition)
No.	Title	Lyrics	Music	Producer(s)	Length
14.	"Hazy"	C. Bailey; H. Bailey	C. Bailey; H. Bailey	C. Bailey	3:23
15.	"80/20"	C. Bailey; H. Bailey	Chelsea Lena; Dillan Bailard; Donnell Stephens III; Jeremy Uribe; Romika Faniel	H. Bailey; Bregma; C. Bailey	2:48
Total length:					43:29

=== Notes ===
- ^{^[a]} signifies a co-producer
- ^{^[b]} signifies an additional producer

== Credits and personnel ==
=== Instrumentation ===
- Adrienne Woods – strings (tracks 1–2, and 12)
- Bianca McClure – strings (tracks 1–2, and 12)
- Chelsea Stevens – strings (tracks 1–2, and 12)
- Derek Dixie – strings (tracks 1–2, and 12)
- Marta Honer – strings (tracks 1–2, and 12)
- Rhea Hosanny – strings (tracks 1–2, and 12)
- Stephanie Matthews – strings (tracks 1–2, and 12)
- Stephanie Yu – strings (tracks 1–2, and 12)

=== Production ===
- Beyoncé Knowles-Carter – executive production
- Chloe x Halle – executive production, production (tracks 10, 12–13)
- Chloe Bailey – production (tracks 1–3, 5, 9, 14–15), co-production (track 8)
- Andrew Makadsi – creative director
- Ricky Lawson – Parkwood project manager
- Jake One – production (track 2)
- Sounwave – production (track 2)
- Scott Storch – production (tracks 4 and 10)
- Halle Bailey – production (track 6)
- Disclosure – production (track 6)
- Gitty – production (tracks 7 and 11)
- Nasri – production (tracks 7 and 11)
- Mike Will Made It – production (track 8)
- Pluss – production (track 8)
- Royal Z – production (track 8)
- Boi-1da – production (track 13)
- Jahaan Sweet – production (track 13)
- Vinylz – production (track 13)
- Bregma – production (track 15)
- Asoteric – co-production (track 4)
- Avedon – co-production (tracks 4 and 10)
- Wallis Lane – co-production (track 10)

=== Technical ===
- Dale Becker – mastering (all tracks)
- Tony Maserati – mixing (tracks 1–7, 10, 11, and 13)
- Jaycen Joshua – mixing (track 8)
- Tyler Scott – mixing (tracks 9, 12, 14, and 15)
- Daniel Pampuri – engineering (tracks 1, 2, 12, and 13)
- Alex Meskvdi – recording (tracks 1 and 2)
- Chloe Bailey – recording (tracks 1–7, 9, and 11–15)
- Todd Robinson – recording (track 4)
- Gitty – recording (track 7)
- Guy Lawrence – recording (track 6)
- Mike Homer – recording (track 8)
- Nathaniel Alford – recording (track 8)
- Randy Lanphear – recording (track 8)
- Nasri – recording (track 11)
- Matt Jacobson – recording (track 15)
- Halle Bailey – recording (tracks 14 and 15), engineering assistance (tracks 1–13)
- Andrea Roberts – engineering assistance (tracks 1, 2, and 12)
- Miles Comaskey – engineering assistance (tracks 1–3, and 6, 7, and 9)
- Najeeb Jones – engineering assistance (tracks 4, 5, and 10–13)
- Thomas Cooper – engineering assistance (track 4)
- DJ Riggins – engineering assistance (track 8)
- Jacob Richards – engineering assistance (track 8)
- Mike Seaberg – engineering assistance (track 8)
- Matt McCobben – engineering assistance (track 13)
- John Lowell Anderson – engineering assistance (tracks 14 and 15)

== Charts ==
Chart performance for Ungodly Hour
Chart (2020)	Peak position
Belgian Albums (Ultratop Flanders)	160
Canadian Albums (Billboard)	71
French Albums (SNEP)	200
UK Albums (Official Charts)	80
UK R&B Albums (Official Charts)	11
US Billboard 200	16
US Top R&B/Hip-Hop Albums (Billboard)	11

== Release history ==
Release history for Ungodly Hour
Region	Date	Format(s)	Version	Label	Ref.
Various	June 12, 2020	Digital download; streaming	Standard	Parkwood; Columbia	
Various	February 26, 2021	Digital download; streaming; LP	Chrome Edition	Parkwood; Columbia	
