= Ungodly Hour (song) =

2020 song by Chloe x Halle

Single by Chloe x Halle

from the album Ungodly Hour
- Released: February 25, 2021
- Genre: Dance-pop; R&B
- Length: 4:16
- Label: Parkwood; Columbia
- Songwriters: Chloe Bailey; Halle Bailey; Guy Lawrence; Howard Lawrence
- Producers: Disclosure; Chloe Bailey

Chloe x Halle singles chronology
"Do It (Remix)" (2020)	"Ungodly Hour" (2021)	"Georgia On My Mind" (2021)

Music video
- "Ungodly Hour" on YouTube

"Ungodly Hour" is a song by American R&B duo Chloe x Halle released as the fourth single for their second studio album of the same name. The song's music video was released on February 25, 2021 after its premiere on The Tonight Show Starring Jimmy Fallon. The song was written by the duo alongside English band Disclosure, who also handled production.

Upon the release of its parent album, "Ungodly Hour" received attention from music critics, who complimented its "sugar-coated melodies over a blissful Disclosure groove" or called it "a moment of vulnerability".

== Background ==
Speaking with PopSugar in January 2020, the duo elaborated on the collaboration and how their session with Disclosure sparked the song's title: "[Disclosure] are two brothers, and they're literally like mirrors of [Chloe x Halle]. [Ungodly Hour] was a phrase for that [studio session] riff. We kind of spoke it into existence, you could say." The interview also revealed an alternate title idea from the session was "The Trouble With Angels".

Chloe Bailey said about the song's development:

We were in the session with Disclosure. Whenever my sister and I create lyrics, sometimes we're inspired randomly on the day and we'll hear a phrase or something. I forgot what I was doing or what I was watching, but I heard the phrase "ungodly hour" and I wrote it in my notes really quick. So when we were all in a session together, we were putting our minds together, like, what can we say with that? And we came up with the phrase "Love me at the ungodly hour". Love me at my worst. Love me when I'm not the best version of myself. And the song kind of wrote itself really fast.

== Accolades ==
Accolades for "Ungodly Hour"
Year	Ceremony	Award	Result	Ref.
2021	Soul Train Music Awards	Best Dance Performance	Nominated	

== Live performances ==
The duo debuted "Ungodly Hour" live at the MTV Video Music Awards pre-show on Sunday, August 30, 2020. It was also performed at BBC's annual 1Xtra Live event in October 2020, and at Pepsi's Unmute Your Voice concert to encourage voting during the 2020 presidential election. On November 15, they performed the track once again at the 46th People's Choice Awards. The song was also part of their first Tiny Desk (Home) Concert uploaded on December 8, 2020.

== Credits and personnel ==
- Chloe Bailey – lead vocals, songwriting, recording
- Halle Bailey – lead vocals, songwriting, engineering
- Guy Lawrence – songwriting, production, recording
- Howard Lawrence – songwriting, production
- Miles Comaskey – engineering
- Tony Maserati – mixing
- Dale Becker – mastering
