= In Your Hands (song) =

Single by Halle

from the album Love?... or Something Like It
- Released: March 15, 2024
- Genre: Soft rock
- Length: 2:52
- Label: Parkwood; Columbia
- Composer: Halle Bailey
- Lyricists: Halle Bailey; Feli Ferraro
- Producers: Dem Jointz; Davekeyz

Halle singles chronology
"Angel" (2023)	"In Your Hands" (2024)	"Because I Love You" (2024)

Music video
- "In Your Hands" on YouTube

"In Your Hands" is a single by American singer-songwriter Halle. The song was released on March 15, 2024, as the second single from her debut studio album, Love?... or Something Like It (2025).

== Background and release ==
After her debut solo single "Angel" in August 2023, Halle starred and performed on 2023 musical film The Color Purple, singing Academy Award's shortlisted song "Keep It Movin'" with Phylicia Pearl Mpasi.

In early February, 2024, Chlöe and Halle confirmed they were working on new project together. Despite it, on February 24, 2024, Chlöe announced the publication of "FYS " as a solo single. On March 6, 2024, Halle also announced her solo song "In Your Hands". The aforementioned project was later revealed to be a collaboration titled "Want Me", the tenth track on Chlöe's second studio album, Trouble in Paradise.

== Composition ==
The song was written by Halle with Feli Ferraro and produced by Dem Jointz and Davekeyz. The song expresses the artist's love for her partner DDG and maternal love for her son Halo, born in December 2023.

== Music video ==
The official music video, directed by Anastasia Delmark, was published on March 15, 2024, through the singer's YouTube channel. The video shows a cameo of the singer's son Halo.

== Charts ==
Chart performance for "In Your Hands"
Chart (2024)	Peak position
New Zealand Hot Singles (RMNZ)	16
US R&B Digital Song Sales (Billboard)	3
US R&B/Hip-Hop Digital Song Sales (Billboard)	9
