= Soul Train Music Award for Best Dance Performance =

Annual US music award

This page lists the winners and nominees for the Soul Train Music Award for Best Dance Performance. This category was created during the 2010 ceremony and since its creation, Ciara and Chris Brown are the only artists to win the award thrice.

== Winners and nominees ==
Winners are listed first and highlighted in bold.

=== 2010s ===
Year	Artist	Song	Ref
2010
2010	**Ciara**	**"Ride"**	
2010	Janelle Monáe (featuring Big Boi)	"Tightrope"	
2010	Ne-Yo	"Beautiful Monster"	
2010	Rihanna	"Rude Boy"	
2010	Usher (featuring will.i.am)	"OMG"	
2011
2011	**Beyoncé**	**"Run the World (Girls)"**	
2011	Chris Brown	"She Ain't You"	
2011	Keri Hilson	"Pretty Girl Rock"	
2011	Mary Mary	"Walking"	
2011	Rihanna (featuring Drake)	"What's My Name?"	
2011	Kelly Rowland (featuring Lil Wayne)	"Motivation"	
2012
2012	**Beyoncé**	**"Love on Top"**	
2012	Chris Brown	"Turn Up the Music"	
2012	Nicki Minaj	"Starships"	
2012	Rihanna	"Where Have You Been"	
2012	Usher	"Scream"	
2013
2013	**Ciara**	**"Body Party"**	
2013	Chris Brown	"Fine China"	
2013	Bruno Mars	"Treasure"	
2013	Janelle Monáe (featuring Erykah Badu)	"Q.U.E.E.N."	
2013	Robin Thicke (featuring T.I. and Pharrell Williams)	"Blurred Lines"	
2013	Justin Timberlake (featuring Jay Z)	"Suit & Tie"	
2014
2014	**Chris Brown (featuring Lil Wayne and Tyga)**	**"Loyal"**	
2014	Jason Derulo (featuring 2 Chainz)	"Talk Dirty"	
2014	DJ Snake and Lil Jon	"Turn Down for What"	
2014	Janelle Monáe (featuring Solange)	"Electric Lady"	
2014	Tinashe (featuring Schoolboy Q)	"2 On"	
2014	Usher	"Good Kisser"	
2015
2015	**Silentó**	**"Watch Me (Whip/Nae Nae)"**	
2015	Beyoncé	"7/11"	
2015	Chris Brown and Tyga	"Ayo"	
2015	Janelle Monáe and Jidenna	"Yoga"	
2015	Mark Ronson (featuring Bruno Mars)	"Uptown Funk"	
2016
2016	**Kanye West (featuring Dance Performance by Teyana Taylor)**	**"Fade"**	
2016	Beyoncé	"Formation"	
2016	Drake	"Hotline Bling"	
2016	Rihanna (featuring Drake)	"Work"	
2016	Usher (featuring Young Thug)	"No Limit"	
2017
2017	**Bruno Mars**	**"24K Magic"**	
2017	Chris Brown (featuring Usher and Gucci Mane)	"Party"	
2017	DJ Khaled (featuring Rihanna and Bryson Tiller)	"Wild Thoughts"	
2017	Solange (featuring Sampha)	"Don't Touch My Hair"	
2017	Wizkid (featuring Drake)	"Come Closer"	
2018
2018	**Ciara**	**"Level Up"**	
2018	Bruno Mars (featuring Cardi B)	"Finesse (Remix)"	
2018	Chris Brown	"Tempo"	
2018	HoodCelebrityy	"Walking Trophy"	
2018	Janet Jackson (featuring Daddy Yankee)	"Made for Now"	
2019
2019	**Chris Brown (featuring Drake)**	**"No Guidance"**	
2019	Beyoncé	"Spirit"	
2019	Lizzo	"Juice"	
2019	Normani	"Motivation"	
2019	Teyana Taylor	"WTP"	
2019	Danileigh (featuring Chris Brown)	"Easy (Remix)"	

=== 2020s ===
Year	Artist	Song	Ref
2020
2020	**Chris Brown and Young Thug**	**"Go Crazy"**	
2020	Beyoncé, Shatta Wale and Major Lazer	"Already"	
2020	Chloe x Halle	"Do It"	
2020	DaniLeigh (featuring DaBaby)	"Levi High"	
2020	Missy Elliott	"Why I Still Love You"	
2020	Teyana Taylor	"Bare Wit Me"	
2021
2021	**Normani (featuring Cardi B)**	**"Wild Side"**	
2021	Chloe x Halle	"Ungodly Hour"	
2021	Chris Brown and Young Thug	"City Girls"	
2021	Lizzo (featuring Cardi B)	"Rumors"	
2021	Usher	"Bad Habits"	
2022
2022	**Lizzo**	**"About Damn Time"**	
2022	Ari Lennox	"Pressure"	
2022	Bruno Mars, Anderson .Paak, Silk Sonic	"Smokin out the Window"	
2022	Chlöe	"Have Mercy"	
2022	Chris Brown (featuring Wizkid)	"Call Me Every Day"	
2022	Chris Brown	"WE (Warm Embrace)"	
2022	Doechii	"Persuasive"	
2022	Doja Cat	"Woman"	
2023
2023	**Victoria Monét**	**"On My Mama"**	
2023	Chris Brown	"Summer Too Hot"	
2023	Chris Brown	"Under the Influence"	
2023	Ciara (featuring Summer Walker)	"Better Thangs"	
2023	Ciara & Chris Brown	"How We Roll"	
2023	SZA	"Snooze"	
2023	Usher	"Boyfriend"	
2023	Usher, Summer Walker & 21 Savage	"Good Good"	

== See also ==
- Soul Train Music Award for Best R&B/Soul or Rap Dance Cut
