= Angel (Halle Bailey song) =

2023 single by Halle Bailey

Single by Halle Bailey

from the album Love?... or Something Like It
- Released: 4 August 2023
- Recorded: February 2022
- Genre: R&B; gospel
- Length: 3:39
- Label: Parkwood; Columbia
- Composer: Theron Feemster
- Lyricists: Coleridge Tillman; Halle Bailey
- Producer: Feemster

Halle Bailey singles chronology
"Angel" (2023)	"In Your Hands" (2024)

Music video
- "Angel" on YouTube

"Angel" is the debut solo single by American singer-songwriter Halle Bailey. The song was released on 4 August 2023, as the lead single from her debut studio album, Love?... or Something Like It (2025). The song was nominated at the 66th Annual Grammy Awards for Best R&B Song.

== Background and release ==
Bailey first teased her solo song on 31 December 2022, for Genius.com through her Instagram Stories. She posted a clip from the studio, where she sang along to the dreamy instrumental on the track. On 3 July 2023, Bailey posted a short clip for "Angel" to her YouTube channel and social media, which featured a montage of childhood home videos and clips of recent solo performances set to the track's instrumental. The teaser closed with the quote, "Angels make a way somehow."

== Composition ==
The song was produced by Theron "NeffU" Feemster and features R&B and gospel sounds. Bailey explained the meaning of the song and its writing process:

"With everything I've gone through the past 3-4 years, suddenly finding myself in this bubble of all these eyes and new opinions, it was easy for me to feel doubt in myself and who I was. This song for me was my climb out of those feelings, a mantra and promise to myself that the work I’m doing here on earth matters and that I matter. I wanted to be able to embrace and be proud of myself and who I am naturally through and through. I hope other brown and Black girls and everyone in general feel embraced, respected, and inspired hearing the words of this song".

== Reception ==
Clash's writer Robin Murray defined the song as a "gorgeous R&B ballad" with "emotive piece of music", making "full use of her incredible voice with its subtle rises, and stunning falls". Alex Gonzalez of Uproxx wrote that the singer "reflects on growing up in the spotlight", singing "over a piano-and-string-driven ballad" in which "she rises above the heartache, and encourages others to follow". HotNewHipHop found that "Neffu's bridges together Halle's powerful vocal performance with ghostly harps, setting up the song for a steely build-up that emotionally unloads at its peak", pointing out that it focused "more insight into her personality" and showed "where she and her sister, Chloe, differ musically". Shelby Stewart of Essence wrote that the production of the song infused "R&B and gospel with cinematic elements" defining the singer's vocals "mesmerizing", which "passionately delivers lyrics". The writer described the song as "an anthem to affirm women and a note to self that her work matters, and holds value".

== Music video ==
The music video for "Angel", directed by Wendy Morgan, premiered via the singer's YouTube channel at the same time of the song's release.

== Charts ==
Chart performance for "Angel"
Chart (2023)	Peak position
Israel (Media Forest)	16
New Zealand Hot Singles (RMNZ)	13
UK Singles Sales (OCC)	70
US Bubbling Under Hot 100 (Billboard)	21
US Digital Song Sales (Billboard)	23
US R&B/Hip-Hop Digital Songs (Billboard)	6
