= BET Awards 2021 =

2021 American television program

2021 BET Awards
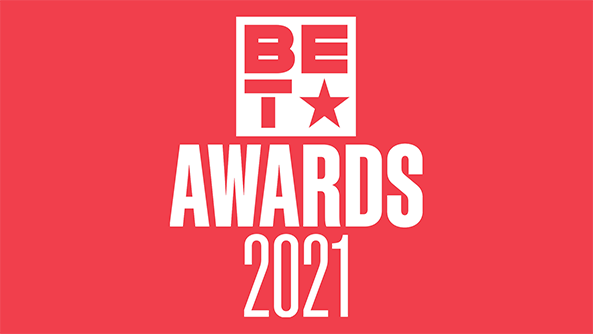
- Date: June 27, 2021
- Location: Microsoft Theater, Los Angeles, California
- Presented by: Black Entertainment Television
- Hosted by: Taraji P. Henson

Highlights
- Most awards: Megan Thee Stallion (4)
- Most nominations: DaBaby and Megan Thee Stallion (7 each)
- Website: www.bet.com/shows/bet-awards.html

Television/radio coverage
- Network: BET; BET Her; MTV; VH1; MTV2; Logo TV; TV Land (simulcast)
- Produced by: Jesse Collins; Connie Orlando; Jeannae Rouzan-Clay; Dionne Harmon (executive producers)
- Directed by: Glenn Weiss

The 21st BET Awards took place on June 27, 2021. The ceremony celebrated achievements in entertainment and honors music, sports, television, and movies. The ceremony's theme was "Year of the Black Woman" and was held in-person with a vaccinated audience following the previous year's virtual ceremony.

The nominees were announced on May 27, 2021. DaBaby and Megan Thee Stallion received the most nominations with 7 each, ahead of Cardi B and Drake, who tied with five nominations each.

On June 14, it was announced that actress Taraji P. Henson would host the ceremony for the first time, and that musician and actress Queen Latifah would be honored with the Lifetime Achievement Award.

== Performers ==
The list of performers was announced on June 17, and was said to be the largest in the ceremony's history.

Artist(s)	Song(s)
Main show
Lil Baby; Kirk Franklin	"We Win"
Migos; Cardi B	"Straightenin" "Type Shit"
H.E.R.	"We Made It"
Moneybagg Yo	"Wockesha" "Time Today"
DaBaby	"Ball If I Want To"
Megan Thee Stallion	"Thot Shit"
Tyler, the Creator	"Lumberjack"
Jazmine Sullivan; Maxine Waters; Ari Lennox	"Tragic" "On It"
Roddy Ricch	"Late at Night"
Lil Nas X	"Montero (Call Me by Your Name)"
Silk Sonic	"Leave the Door Open"
City Girls	"Twerkulator"
Rapsody; Monie Love; Lil' Kim; MC Lyte	Tribute to Queen Latifah: "Ladies First" "U.N.I.T.Y."
DJ Khaled; Lil Durk; Lil Baby; Megan Thee Stallion; H.E.R. DaBaby	"Hats Off" "Every Chance I Get" "I Did It"
Andra Day	"Strange Fruit" "Tigress & Tweed"
Method Man; Westside Gunn; Benny the Butcher; Conway the Machine; Michael K. Williams; Swizz Beatz; The Lox; Busta Rhymes	Tribute to DMX: "Get at Me Dog" "Hood Blues" "Where the Hood At?" "X Gon' Give It to Ya" "Slippin'" "Let Me Fly" "Ruff Ryders' Anthem (Remix)" "Party Up (Up in Here)" "The Prayer IV"
BET Amplified Stage
Tone Stith	"FWM"
Mereba	"Rider"

== Winners and nominees ==
Album of the Year	Video of the Year
Heaux Tales – Jazmine Sullivan; After Hours – The Weeknd; Blame It on Baby – DaBaby; Good News – Megan Thee Stallion; King's Disease – Nas; Ungodly Hour – Chloe x Halle	Cardi B featuring Megan Thee Stallion – "WAP"; Cardi B – "Up"; Chloe x Halle – "Do It"; Chris Brown and Young Thug – "Go Crazy"; Drake featuring Lil Durk– "Laugh Now Cry Later"; Silk Sonic – "Leave the Door Open"
Coca-Cola Viewers' Choice Award	Best Collaboration
Megan Thee Stallion featuring Beyoncé – "Savage (Remix)"; Cardi B featuring Megan Thee Stallion – "WAP"; Chris Brown and Young Thug – "Go Crazy"; DaBaby featuring Roddy Ricch – "Rockstar"; DJ Khaled featuring Drake – "Popstar"; Drake featuring Lil Durk– "Laugh Now Cry Later"; Lil Baby – "The Bigger Picture"; Silk Sonic – "Leave the Door Open"	Cardi B featuring Megan Thee Stallion – "WAP"; DaBaby featuring Roddy Ricch – "Rockstar"; DJ Khaled featuring Drake – "Popstar"; Jack Harlow featuring DaBaby, Tory Lanez and Lil Wayne – "Whats Poppin (Remix)"; Megan Thee Stallion featuring DaBaby– "Cry Baby"; Pop Smoke featuring Lil Baby and DaBaby – "For the Night"
Best Female R&B/Pop Artist	Best Male R&B/Pop Artist
H.E.R.; Beyoncé; Jazmine Sullivan; Jhene Aiko; Summer Walker; SZA	Chris Brown; 6lack; Anderson .Paak; Giveon; Tank; The Weeknd
Best Female Hip Hop Artist	Best Male Hip Hop Artist
Megan Thee Stallion; Cardi B; Coi Leray; Doja Cat; Latto; Saweetie	Lil Baby; DaBaby; Drake; J. Cole; Jack Harlow; Pop Smoke
Best Group	Best New Artist
Silk Sonic; 21 Savage and Metro Boomin; Chloe x Halle; Chris Brown and Young Thug; City Girls; Migos	Giveon; Coi Leray; Flo Milli; Jack Harlow; Latto; Pooh Shiesty
Dr. Bobby Jones Best Gospel/Inspirational Award	BET Her Award
Kirk Franklin – "Strong God"; BeBe Winans – "In Jesus Name"; CeCe Winans – "Never Lost"; H.E.R. – "Hold Us Together"; Marvin Sapp – "Thank You for It All"; Tamela Mann – "Touch from You"	SZA – "Good Days"; Alicia Keys featuring Khalid – "So Done"; Brandy featuring Chance the Rapper – "Baby Mama"; Bri Steves – "Anti Queen"; Chloe x Halle – "Baby Girl"; Ciara featuring Ester Dean – "Rooted"
Video Director of the Year	Best Movie
Bruno Mars and Florent Déchard; Benny Boom; Cole Bennett; Colin Tilley; Dave Meyers; Hype Williams	Judas and the Black Messiah; Coming 2 America; Ma Rainey's Black Bottom; One Night in Miami...; Soul; The United States vs. Billie Holiday
Best Actress	Best Actor
Andra Day; Angela Bassett; Issa Rae; Jurnee Smollett; Viola Davis; Zendaya	Chadwick Boseman; Aldis Hodge; Damson Idris; Daniel Kaluuya; Eddie Murphy; Lakeith Stanfield
YoungStars Award	Sportswoman of the Year
Marsai Martin; Alex R. Hibbert; Ethan Hutchison; Lonnie Chavis; Michael Epps; Storm Reid	Naomi Osaka; A'ja Wilson; Candace Parker; Claressa Shields; Serena Williams; Skylar Diggins-Smith
Sportsman of the Year	Best International Act
LeBron James; Kyrie Irving; Patrick Mahomes II; Russell Westbrook; Russell Wilson; Stephen Curry	Burna Boy (Nigeria); Aya Nakamura (France); Diamond Platnumz (Tanzania); Emicida (Brazil); Headie One (UK); Wizkid (Nigeria); Young T & Bugsey (UK); Youssoupha (France)
Best New International Act	Lifetime Achievement Award
Bree Runway (UK); Arlo Parks (UK); Bramsito (France); Elaine (South Africa); MC Dricka (Brazil); Ronisia (France); Tems (Nigeria)	Queen Latifah

== In Memoriam ==
- Shock G
- Douglas Turner Ward
- Toots Hibbert
- Gale Sayers
- Thomas Jefferson Byrd
- Johnny Nash
- Anthony Chisolm
- MF Doom
- Bert Belasco
- Natalie Desselle Reid
- Carol Sutton
- Tommy Lister
- Charley Pride
- Whodini
- Joe Louis Clark
- Shabba Doo
- Eric Jerome Dickey
- Hank Aaron
- Cicely Tyson
- Leon Spinks
- Mary Wilson
- Vincent Jackson
- Bunny Wailer
- Reggie Warren
- Black Rob
- Paul Mooney
- Clarence Williams III
- Chadwick Boseman
- DMX
