= Forgive Me (Chloe x Halle song) =

2020 single by Chloe x Halle

Single by Chloe x Halle

from the album Ungodly Hour
- Released: June 12, 2020
- Genre: Trap; pop; R&B
- Length: 2:38
- Label: Parkwood; Columbia
- Songwriters: Chloe Bailey; Halle Bailey; Nija Charles; Mark Spears; Jake One; India Perkins
- Producers: Jake One; Chloe Bailey; Sounwave

Chloe x Halle singles chronology
"Do It" (2020)	"Forgive Me" (2020)	"Do It" (Remix) (2020)

Music video
- "Forgive Me" on YouTube

"Forgive Me" is a song by American duo Chloe x Halle from their second studio album Ungodly Hour (2020). It was released as the third single on June 12, 2020, with an accompanying music video for the song being released on the same day of the single's release. The song was written by the duo, Nija Charles, India Perkins, Sounwave and Jake One, with the latter two also handling the production, alongside Chloe Bailey.

== Composition ==
"Forgive Me" is an uptempo trap-pop and R&B song. Lyrically, the song drives the message of being completely unapologetic in who you are and feeling self-empowered, regardless of who accepts or rejects it. "Forgive Me" comes on after the album's intro which opens with an "angelic" choral delivery and serves as the opening for the song. It is led into by the album's signature message, "Don't ever ask for permission, Ask for forgiveness", extending upon the moody backdrop first established by the intro. "So forgive me, forgive me, I been goin' too hard in your city", Chloe x Halle sing on the chorus. "So forgive me 'cause I'm not teary, best believe I'll move onto better things". Of the 13 songs, the duo told CBS News that the song defines the entire album.

== Music video ==
The music video for "Forgive Me" was released on June 12, 2020, the same day the album came out. The video is "dark and moody" and features special effects intermixed with choreography.

== Critical reception ==
Sidney Madden of NPR said the duo deliver a "scorcher", with harmonizing vocals, calling the track an early album favorite. Madden further described it as "a celebration of maturity matched with sex appeal that comes as a needed break from the severity of life". Jessica McKinney of Complex listed "Forgive Me" among the best new music of the week, stating: the "sultry and soothing melodies over Sounwave's bass-filled beat is what will make this a fan favorite".

== Live performances ==
Chloe x Halle performed "Forgive Me" for the first time on June 29, 2020 at the BET Awards 2020.

== Credits and personnel ==
- Chloe x Halle – vocals, executive production
  - Chloe Bailey – songwriting, production, recording engineer
  - Halle Bailey – songwriting, assistant engineer
- Mark Spears – songwriting, production
- Jacob Dutton – songwriting, production
- Nija Charles – songwriting
- India Perkins – songwriting
- Stephanie Yu — strings
- Stephanie Matthews — strings
- Rhea Hosanny — strings
- Marta Honer — strings
- Derek Dixie — strings
- Chelsea Stevens — strings
- Bianca McClure — strings
- Adrienne Woods — strings
- Tony Maserati – mixing engineer
- Alex Meskvdi – recording engineer
- Daniel Pampuri – engineer
- Miles Comaskey — assistant engineer
- Andrea Roberts — assistant engineer
- Dale Becker – mastering engineer

== Charts ==
Chart (2020)	Peak position
New Zealand Hot Singles (RMNZ)	28
US Bubbling Under Hot 100 (Billboard)	7
US Hot R&B Songs (Billboard)	10
