= Chloe x Halle =

American alternative R&B duo

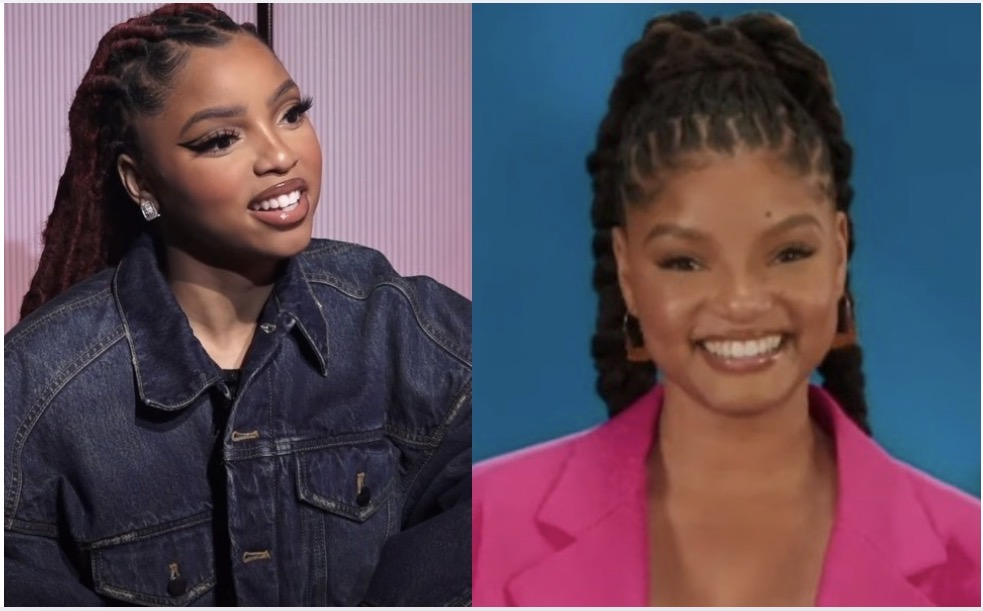
- Members of Chloe x Halle. Left: Chloe Bailey, and Right: Halle Bailey

Background information
- Origin: Mableton, Georgia, U.S.
- Genres: R&B; alternative R&B; pop
- Years active: 2012–present
- Labels: Parkwood; Columbia
- Members: Chloe Bailey; Halle Bailey
- Website: chloexhalle.com

Chloe x Halle (pronounced "Chloe and Halle") is an American alternative R&B duo consisting of sisters Chloe and Halle Bailey. At a young age, the sisters performed in minor acting roles before traveling from their hometown of Mableton, Georgia to Los Angeles in 2012. The sister duo act began posting music covers to YouTube and were recognized by Beyoncé, who became their mentor and later signed them to her label, Parkwood Entertainment. They subsequently released the EP Sugar Symphony (2016) and the mixtape The Two of Us (2017).

The duo gained further prominence after starring in the sitcom Grown-ish (2018–2022) and releasing their debut album The Kids Are Alright (2018), for which they earned two Grammy Award nominations for Best New Artist and Best Urban Contemporary Album. In 2020, they released their second studio album Ungodly Hour to critical acclaim, earning them another three Grammy Award nominations for Best Progressive R&B Album, Best R&B Song for "Do It" and Best Traditional R&B Performance for "Wonder What She Thinks of Me". "Do It" became the duo's first song to chart on the Billboard Hot 100 and the Hot R&B/Hip-Hop Songs, peaking at number 63 and number 23 respectively. The album itself peaked at number 16 and number 11 on the Billboard 200 and Top R&B/Hip-Hop Albums charts, respectively, becoming the duo's highest peak on the former chart and their first appearance on the latter.

== Life and career ==
=== 1998–2015: Early life and career beginnings ===
Chloe and Halle Bailey were born in Atlanta on July 1, 1998, and March 27, 2000, respectively. They grew up in Mableton, Georgia, with their parents Courtney and Doug Bailey, Their family moved to Los Angeles in 2012. While they were living in Georgia, the two played minor acting roles in films, including The Fighting Temptations (2003), starring Beyoncé, where Chloe starred solo, and the Disney Channel original movie Let It Shine (2012). Their father began teaching them how to write songs at the ages of ten and eight. They launched a YouTube channel at the ages of 13 and 11, respectively, with a cover of Beyoncé's "Best Thing I Never Had." They first performed as Chloe x Halle when uploading covers of pop songs onto this channel. The duo made their talk show debut when they appeared on The Ellen Show in April 2012. They were the winners of the fifth season of The Next Big Thing on Radio Disney in December 2012, and they made a cameo appearance in the Disney series Austin & Ally performing the song "Unstoppable" in September 2013.

After gaining prominence with their YouTube videos and Disney projects, the duo independently released a four-track project titled Uncovered in 2013. The release was made up of covers of the pop songs "Applause", "We Can't Stop", "Roar", and "Wrecking Ball". Their rendition of Beyoncé's "Pretty Hurts" went viral and drew the attention of the singer herself. In 2015, Beyoncé signed the duo to her management company, Parkwood Entertainment, with a reported $1 million deal for six albums. The duo made a cameo appearance in Beyoncé's visual album Lemonade (2016) and accepted the BET Award for Viewer's Choice on her behalf in 2016.

=== 2016–2017: Sugar Symphony and The Two of Us ===
Chloe x Halle made their professional debut with the EP, Sugar Symphony, which was released under Parkwood on April 29, 2016. The duo's debut single and the EP's lead single "Drop" was released in early April. They were accompanied by the EP's second and final single, "Fall", in September 2016. The duo performed the song, in addition to "Baby Bird" and "This Is for My Girls", at the White House Easter Egg Roll, where they were introduced by Michelle Obama. Prior to this, Chloe x Halle was the opening act at Obama's keynote discussion at the SXSW Music Festival in March 2016. They also performed "Drop" at the BET Awards 2016. Chloe x Halle later served as Beyoncé's opening act for the European leg of The Formation World Tour. The duo also supported American singer Andra Day on her Cheers to the Fall tour in late 2016.

In the spring of 2017, Chloe x Halle released their critically acclaimed mixtape, The Two of Us, which featured new music mostly written and produced by the duo. The mixtape was featured on Rolling Stone magazine's "Best R&B Albums of 2017" list. In April 2017, the duo performed "The Star-Spangled Banner" to begin the 2017 NFL draft. Chloe x Halle released the theme song for the TV series Grown-ish, titled "Grown", in December 2017. After initially signing onto the series for recurring roles, they were upgraded to series regulars for the show's second season. Their song "The Kids Are Alright" was featured in the series debut. They were on the show for four seasons until their characters graduated.

=== 2018–2019: The Kids Are Alright ===
Both "Grown" and "The Kids Are Alright" served as the lead and second singles of Chloe x Halle's debut studio album, The Kids Are Alright, which they announced in late February 2018. Their single "Warrior" appeared on both the soundtrack for the film A Wrinkle in Time (2018) and their debut album. The duo performed the song "America the Beautiful" at WrestleMania 34 in early April 2018. Chloe x Halle released their debut studio album, The Kids Are Alright, on March 23, 2018, to critical acclaim. Promoting the album, Chloe x Halle performed "Happy Without Me" and "The Kids Are Alright" on Jimmy Kimmel Live!.

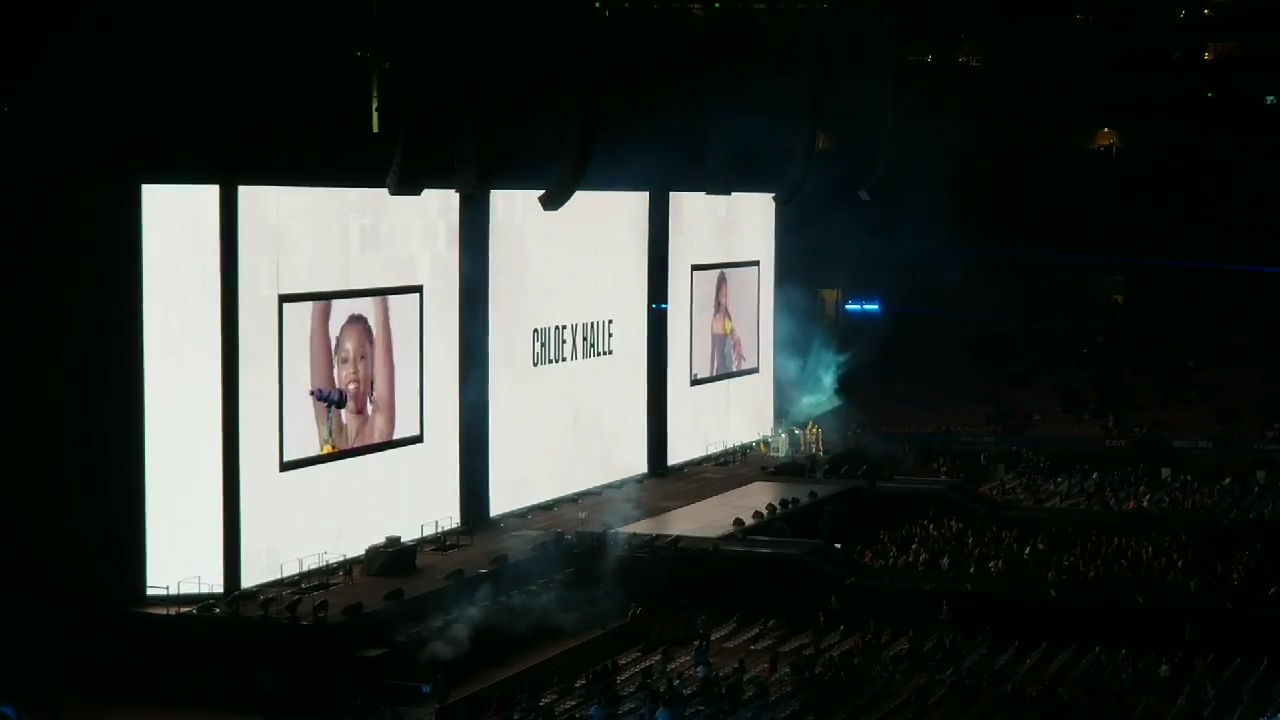
Chloe x Halle opening for Beyoncé in Los Angeles during the On the Run II Tour

Chloe x Halle's performance at Coachella Valley Music and Arts Festival was well received by critics. On May 31, 2018, it was announced that they would be the opening act for the U.S. leg of Beyoncé and Jay-Z's On the Run II Tour, alongside DJ Khaled. Chloe x Halle were nominated for two Grammy Awards in December 2018. They were nominated in the Best New Artist and Best Urban Contemporary Album (for The Kids Are Alright) categories. At the ceremony, they honored American musician Donny Hathaway by performing his 1972 single "Where Is the Love", and they presented the award for Best Rap Album to Cardi B. Chloe x Halle's performance of "America the Beautiful" at the Super Bowl LIII was praised by their mentor Beyoncé and by several news publications.

The duo appeared and performed on American media personality Nick Cannon's television show Wild 'n Out in late July 2019. In September 2019, their cover of the Platters' "Enchanted" was featured in the recap montage of Jesse Pinkman's arc on Breaking Bad to coincide the Netflix film El Camino: A Breaking Bad Movie.

=== 2020–2021: Ungodly Hour ===
On April 17, 2020, Chloe x Halle and Swae Lee released "Catch Up", a collaboration with Mike Will Made It, alongside a lyric video, and on May 14, 2020, the duo released the single "Do It" and announced their second album, Ungodly Hour. The next day, "Forgive Me" was announced as the second single, released along with a video. They released Ungodly Hour on June 12, 2020, to critical acclaim. The album debuted at number 16 on the Billboard 200 chart with 24,000 units sold. "Do It" also became their first entry on the Billboard Hot 100, debuting at number 83, on the chart dated June 27, 2020. They performed the song at the 31st GLAAD Media Awards, as well as the 2020 BET Awards, which was where they also performed "Forgive Me" for the first time. Amid the COVID-19 pandemic, Chloe x Halle also performed "Do It" on the Dear Class of 2020 virtual commencement event in early June 2020, as well as on The Today Show and Jimmy Kimmel Live!. On August 30, the duo performed the title track, "Ungodly Hour", during the pre-show for the 2020 MTV VMAs. Chloe x Halle performed "The Star-Spangled Banner" at the kickoff game for the 2020 NFL season in September 2020. In early September 2020, Chloe x Halle released a remix of their single "Do It" featuring Doja Cat, City Girls and Mulatto. The duo hosted the Glamour Women of the Year Awards in October 2020.

In November 2020, they received nominations for Album of the Year, Song of the Year, Video of the Year, Best Dance Performance and The Ashford And Simpson Songwriter's Award at the 2020 Soul Train Music Awards. They also received nominations for Best Progressive R&B Album, Best R&B Song and Best Traditional R&B Performance at the 63rd Annual Grammy Awards. On November 15, the duo performed the album's title track, "Ungodly Hour" at the 46th People's Choice Awards, where they were nominated for "Group of 2020". In December 2020, Chloe x Halle appeared in The Disney Holiday Singalong event and performed "Do You Want to Build a Snowman?" They performed the songs "Don't Make It Harder on Me", "Baby Girl", "Do It", "Ungodly Hour", and "Wonder What She Thinks of Me" at their NPR Tiny Desk Concert in December 2020. They also performed "Baby Girl" at the 2020 Billboard Women in Music ceremony, where Beyoncé presented them with the Rising Star Award.

On February 24, 2021, a music video for the album's title track "Ungodly Hour" was released. Following this, Ungodly Hour (Chrome Edition), a reissue of the album, was released on February 26, 2021. The reissue would include two new songs and a first time vinyl release. On October 8, 2021, it was announced that Chloe x Halle would be among those honored at the 2021 Ebony Power 100 event on October 23 in Los Angeles. Chloe x Halle were named as stars on the rise in the NextGen bracket.

=== 2021–2023: Solo projects ===
On February 18, 2021, the duo announced separate personal social media accounts on Twitter after creating separate Instagram accounts in January 2021 in order to promote their own solo projects: Chloe's own debut album, In Pieces, and acting roles, such as Swarm and Praise This, and Halle's film roles for the live-action remake of Disney's The Little Mermaid and the 2023 film adaptation of the Broadway musical version of Alice Walker's The Color Purple. On March 22, 2023, Halle indicated that she and her sister are not done with making music as a duo. On August 4, 2023, Halle's debut solo single "Angel" was released. On November 20, 2026, the duo regrouped to release an original Christmas song titled "All I Think About on Christmas". It marked their first release in 3 years under their group name since they began their solo careers.

== Artistry ==
Chloe x Halle blend pop, R&B, soul and hip-hop in their music, combined with 90s R&B, jazz vocals that infused with electronica. The duo write, arrange, and produce all of their songs in their home studio. They are also self-taught musicians. Halle enjoys jazz and has been listening to Billie Holiday from a young age. She cited the singer as being one of her major vocal influences. Chloe, the primary producer, is inspired by artists such as Grimes, Missy Elliott, and Tune-Yards, as well as some R&B artists. The duo describe their style of music as "confetti" because of its "harmonious" nature put together with "heavy beats and 808 drums that come together like a symphony." Chloe x Halle have said that their music style is a combination of their music tastes. Chloe said: "My sister and I like to make music that has interesting sounds and nuances."

== Discography ==
Studio albums

- The Kids Are Alright (2018)
- Ungodly Hour (2020)

== Tours ==
Opening act

- Beyoncé – The Formation World Tour (2016)
- Andra Day – Cheers to the Fall Tour (2016)
- Jay-Z and Beyoncé – On the Run II Tour (2018)

== Filmography ==
=== Film ===
Year	Film	Chloe	Halle	Notes	Ref.
2016	Beyoncé: Lemonade	Themselves		Segment: "All Night" intro	
2018	The Kids Are Alright	Themselves		Short film	

=== Television ===
Year	Title	Chloe	Halle	Notes	Ref.
2012	The Ellen Show	Themselves		Episode dated: "April 9, 2012"	
2013	Austin & Ally	Themselves		Episode: "Moon Week & Mentors"	
2018	Wild 'n Out	Themselves		Episode: "Chloe x Halle"	
2020	The Disney Family Singalong: Volume II	Themselves		Television special	
2020	The Kelly Clarkson Show	Themselves		Episode dated: "July 9, 2020"	
2020	The Disney Holiday Singalong	Themselves		Television special	

January 1, 2024: Chloe x Halle - "Pandora Be Love" Commercial Ad (alongside actress Selma Blair)

=== Music videos ===
- All Night – (2016)
- Drop – (2016)
- Fall – (2016)
- Grown – (2017)
- The Kids Are Alright – (2018)
- Warrior – (2018)
- Happy Without Me – (2018)
- Shine Bright – (2018)
- Cool People – (2018)
- Who Knew – (2019)
- Catch Up – (2020)
- Do It – (2020)
- Forgive Me – (2020)
- Ungodly Hour – (2021)

== Awards and nominations ==
Year	Award	Category	Work	Result	Ref.
2012	Radio Disney Music Awards	The Next Big Thing	Themselves	Won	
2017	NAACP Image Awards	Outstanding New Artist	Themselves	Nominated	
2018	BET Awards	Best Group	Themselves	Nominated	
2018	BET Awards	Her Award	"The Kids Are Alright"	Nominated	
2018	MTV Video Music Awards	Best New Artist	Themselves	Nominated	
2018	MTV Video Music Awards	Push Artist of the Year	Themselves	Nominated	
2018	MTV Europe Music Awards	Best Push Act	Themselves	Nominated	
2018	Soul Train Music Awards	Album of the Year	The Kids Are Alright	Nominated	
2019	Grammy Awards	Best New Artist	Themselves	Nominated	
2019	Grammy Awards	Best Urban Contemporary Album	The Kids Are Alright	Nominated	
2019	BET Awards	Best Group	Themselves	Nominated	
2019	Berlin Music Video Awards	Best Editor (for Andrew Morrow, Cara Stricker and Andre Jones)	The Kids Are Alright film	Third	
2019	Bulletin Awards	Duo/Group of the Year	Themselves	Won	
2020	BET Awards	Best Group	Themselves	Nominated	
2020	MTV Video Music Awards	Best Group	Themselves	Nominated	
2020	MTV Video Music Awards	Best R&B	"Do It"	Nominated	
2020	MTV Video Music Awards	Best Quarantine Performance	"Do It"	Nominated	
2020	People's Choice Awards	Group of 2020	Themselves	Nominated	
2020	MTV Europe Music Awards	Best Group	Themselves	Nominated	
2020	Soul Train Music Awards	Album of the Year	Ungodly Hour	Nominated	
2020	Soul Train Music Awards	The Ashford And Simpson Songwriter's Award	"Do It"	Nominated	
2020	Soul Train Music Awards	Best Dance Performance	"Do It"	Nominated	
2020	Soul Train Music Awards	Song of the Year	"Do It"	Nominated	
2020	Soul Train Music Awards	Video of the Year	"Do It"	Nominated	
2020	Billboard Women in Music	Rising Star Award	Themselves	Won	
2020	Bulletin Awards	Duo/Group of the Year	Themselves	Nominated	
2020	Bulletin Awards	Single of the Year	"Do It"	Nominated	
2020	Bulletin Awards	Music Video of the Year	"Do It"	Nominated	
2020	Bulletin Awards	Song of the Summer	"Do It"	Nominated	
2020	Bulletin Awards	Album of the Year	Ungodly Hour	Nominated	
2021	Grammy Awards	Best Progressive R&B Album	Ungodly Hour	Nominated	
2021	Grammy Awards	Best R&B Song	"Do It"	Nominated	
2021	Grammy Awards	Best Traditional R&B Performance	"Wonder What She Thinks of Me"	Nominated	
2021	NAACP Image Awards	Outstanding Duo, Group or Collaboration (Contemporary)	"Do It"	Nominated	
2021	NAACP Image Awards	Outstanding Duo, Group or Collaboration (Traditional)	"Wonder What She Thinks of Me"	Won	
2021	NAACP Image Awards	Outstanding Music Video/Visual Album	"Do It"	Nominated	
2021	NAACP Image Awards	Outstanding Soul/R&B Song	"Do It"	Won	
2021	iHeartRadio Music Awards	Best New R&B Artist	Themselves	Nominated	
2021	iHeartRadio Music Awards	Favorite Music Video Choreography	"Do It"	Nominated	
2021	BET Awards	Album of the Year	Ungodly Hour	Nominated	
2021	BET Awards	Best Group	Themselves	Nominated	
2021	BET Awards	Her Award	"Baby Girl"	Nominated	
2021	BET Awards	Video of the Year	"Do It"	Nominated	
2021	Soul Train Music Awards	Best Dance Performance	"Ungodly Hour"	Nominated	
2021	Bulletin Awards	Duo of the Year	Themselves	Won	
2021	Bulletin Awards	Performance of the Year	"Ungodly Hour" (VMAs 2020)	Nominated	
2022	NAACP Image Awards	Outstanding Duo, Group or Collaboration (Traditional)	"Georgia On My Mind"	Nominated	
