= Dear Class of 2020 =

- Created by: YouTube Originals
- Original language: English

Production
- Executive producers: Guy Carrington; Brian Cavallaro; Melanie Fletcher; Kim Gamble; David Jammy; Kristen Wong
- Producers: Raj Kapoor; Meghan Kerns; Roisin Moloney; Augie Max Vargas; Vanessa Ashton
- Production location: Virtual
- Editors: Mike Polito; Buzz Chapman; James Collett; Chester Contaoi; Japeth Crawford; Josh Cregg; Sharon Everett; Enrique Gutierrez; Dan Morita; Dan Olsen; Tim Perniciaro; Tim Schultz
- Running time: 274 minutes
- Production company: Done and Dusted

Original release
- Network: YouTube
- Release: June 7, 2020

Dear Class of 2020 was a 2020 online event streamed live on June 7, 2020 on YouTube. It was a virtual commencement event that features speeches and performances from prominent personalities aimed at graduating students of all levels whose actual ceremonies were cancelled due to the COVID-19 pandemic. The event also highlighted the George Floyd protest following the murders of George Floyd and Ahmaud Arbery, and the shooting of Breonna Taylor. Originally scheduled on June 6, the event was rescheduled the day after to avoid clashing with the memorial service for George Floyd held on that date in Raeford, North Carolina.

== Appearances ==
=== Commencement speakers ===
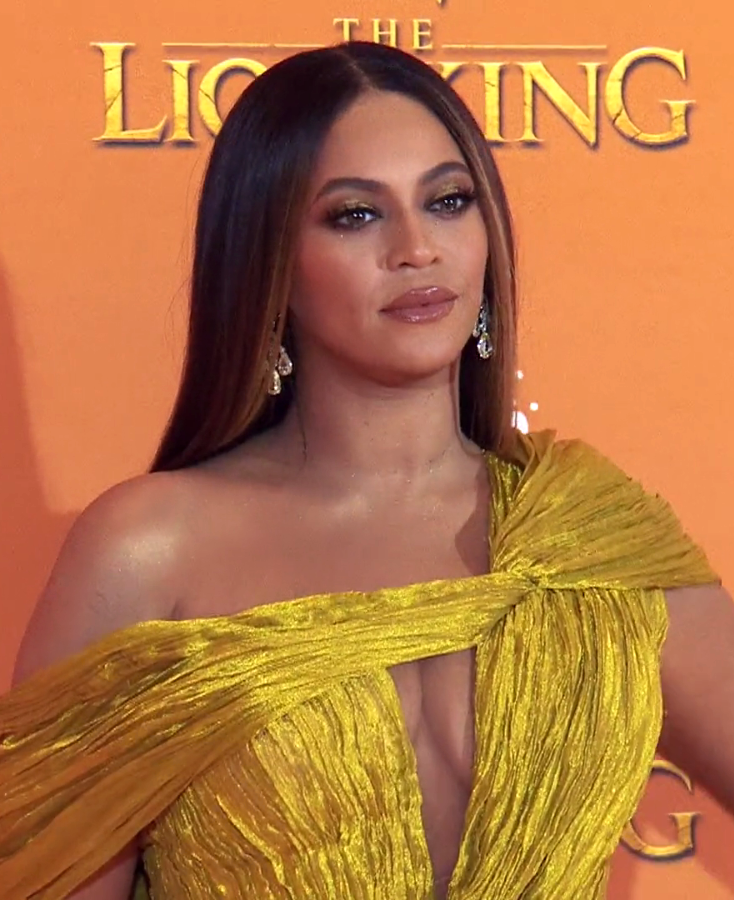
Singer
Beyoncé

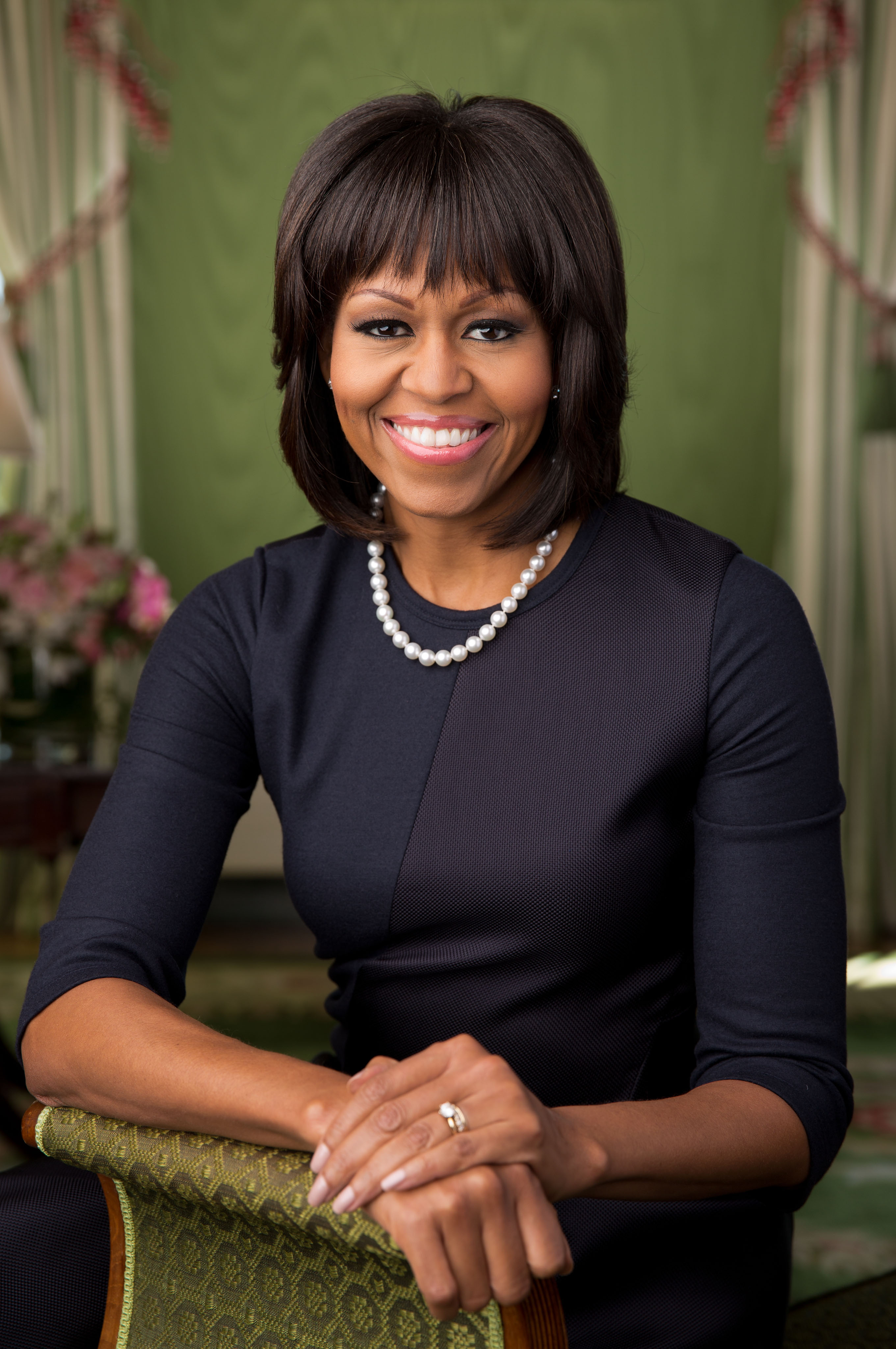
Former First Lady of the United States
Michelle Obama

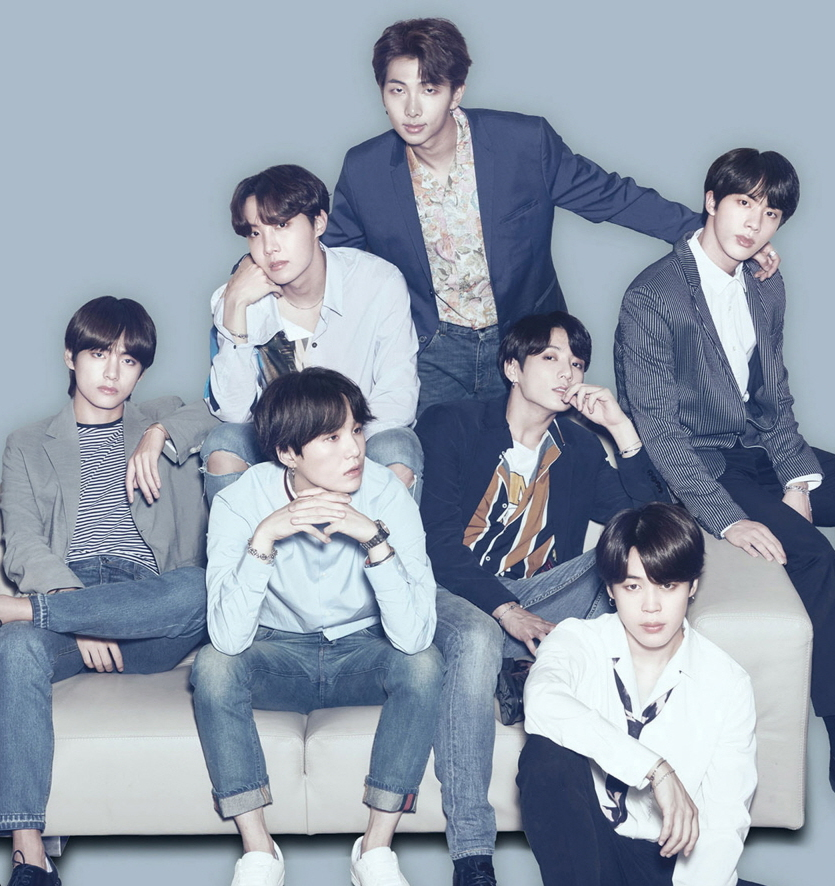
Boy band
BTS

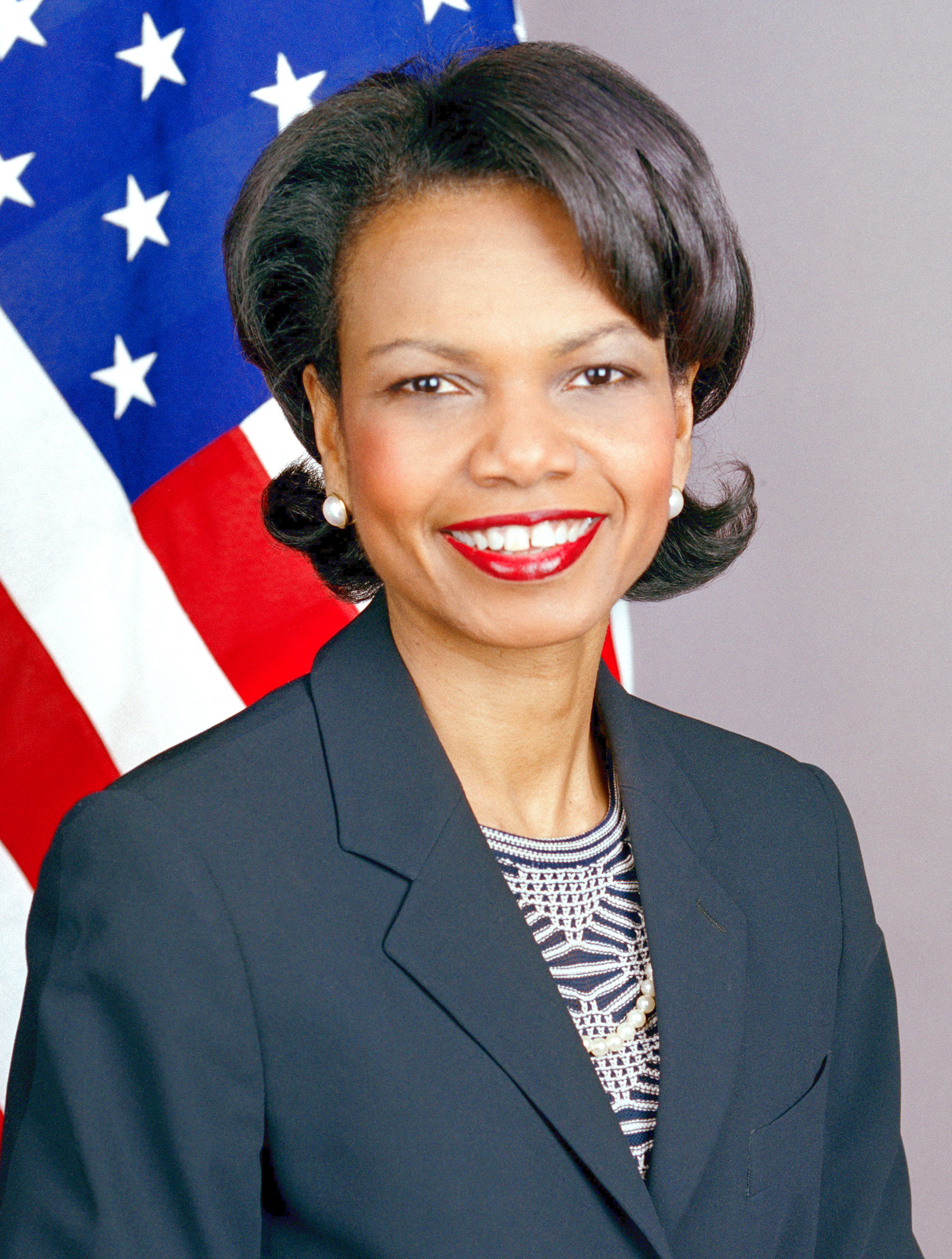
Former United States Secretary of State
Condoleezza Rice

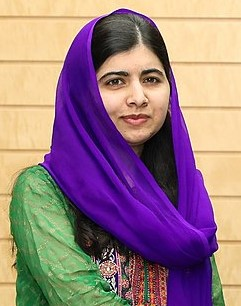
Activist
Malala Yousafzai

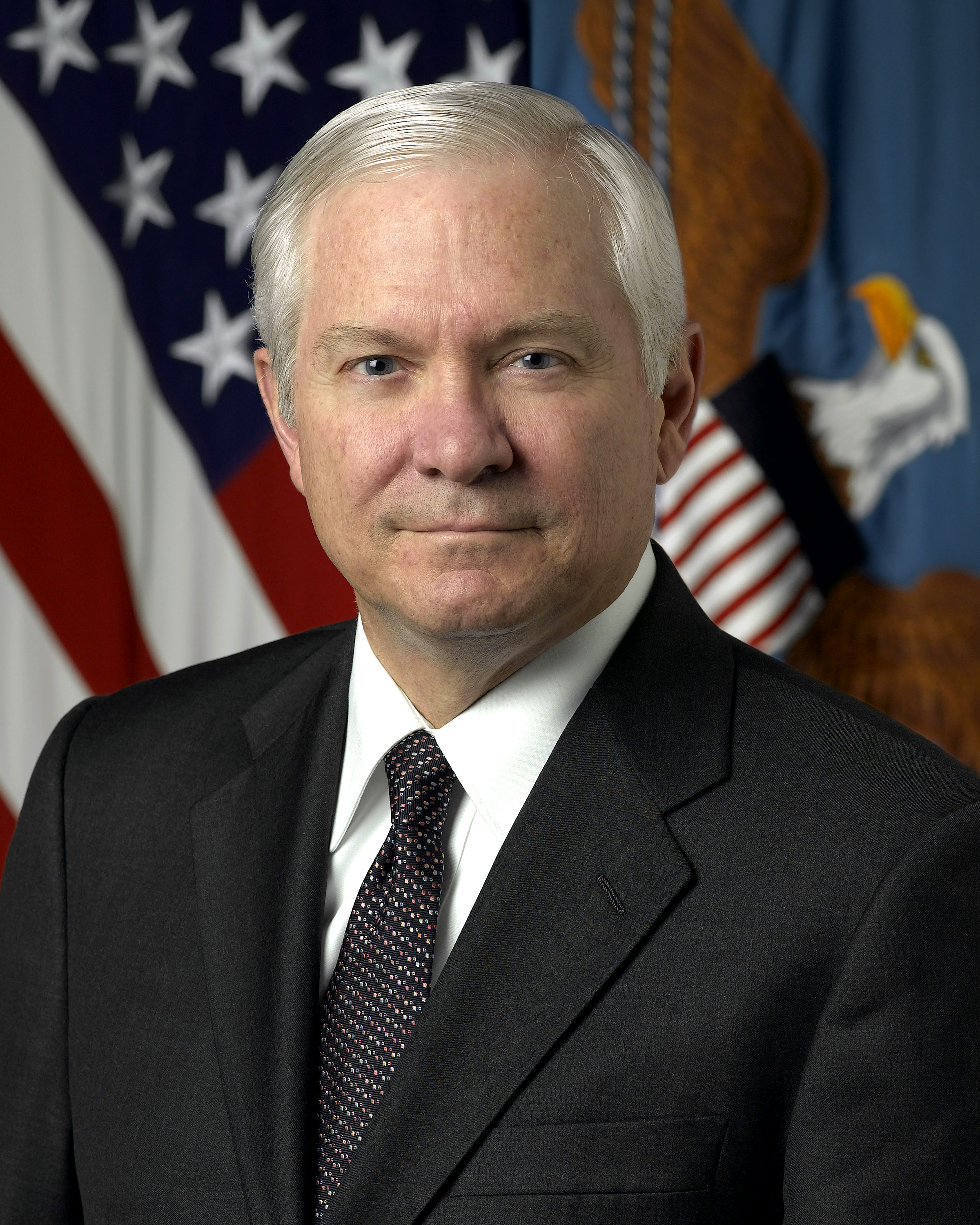
Former United States Secretary of Defense
Robert Gates

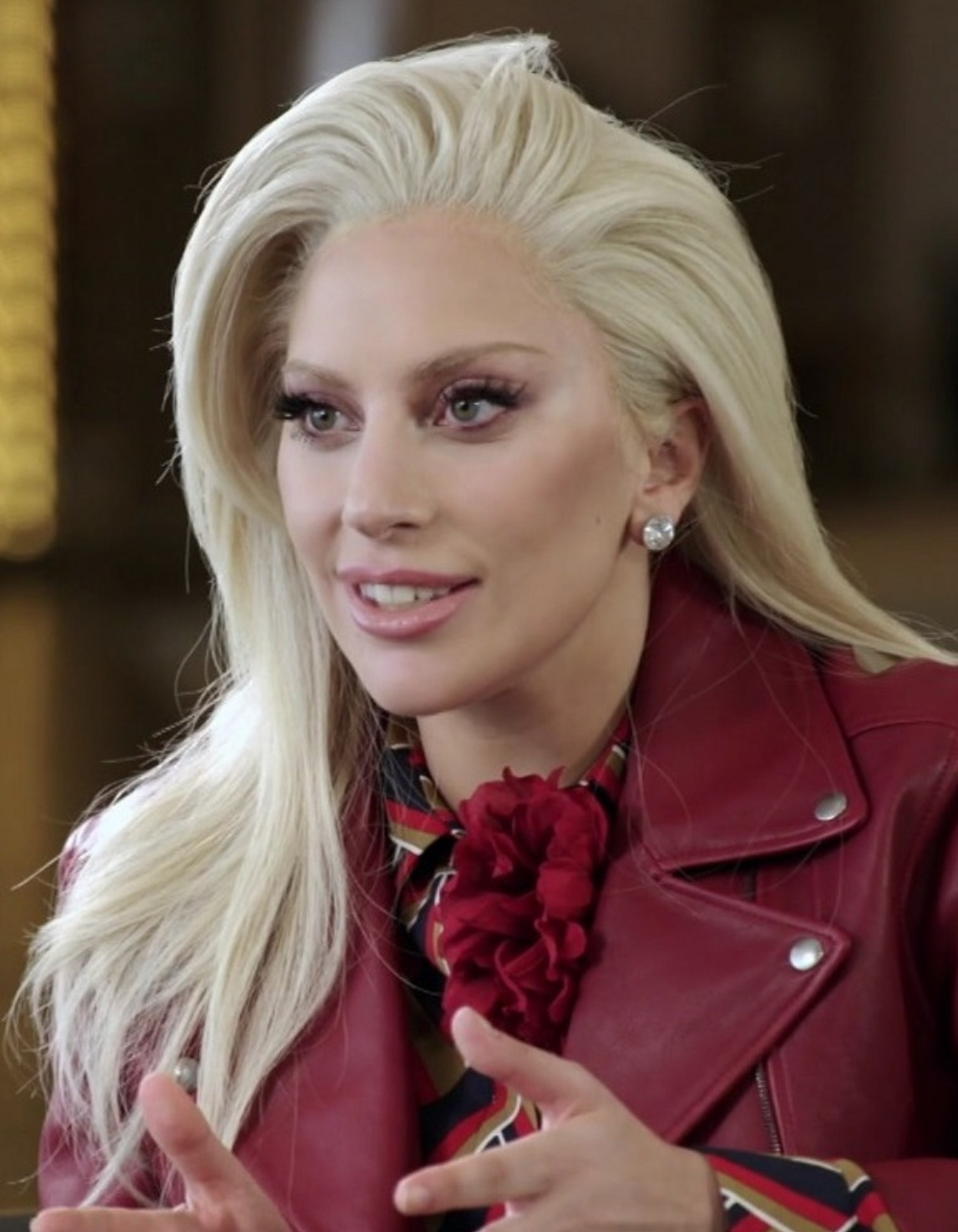
Singer
Lady Gaga

Former President of the United States
Barack Obama

=== YouTube creators ===
- Merrell Twins
- Mr. Kate
- AsapScience
- Mark Rober
- Unjaded Jade and Folkert
- The Try Guys
- Emma Chamberlain
- Jackie Aina
- Dude Perfect
- Nikkie de Jager
- Prajakta Koli
- Zane and Heath

=== Words of encouragement ===
- Alicia Keys
- Justin Timberlake
- Homer, Marge, Bart, and Lisa Simpson (voiced by Dan Castellaneta, Julie Kavner, Nancy Cartwright, and Yeardley Smith)
- Liza Koshy
- Shawn Mendes
- Taylor Swift
- Billie Eilish
- Bono
- Missy Elliott
- Jimmy Kimmel
- Colin Jost
- Tom Hanks and Rita Wilson
- La La Anthony
- Ray Allen
- Chris Cassidy
- Jenna Bush Hager
- John Green
- Joseph Gordon-Levitt
- Stephen Colbert
- Jennifer Lopez
- Kerry Washington
- Ian Book
- Phoebe Robinson
- Michael B. Jordan
- D-Nice
- Antoni Porowski
- The cast of Euphoria
  - Storm Reid
  - Barbie Ferreira
  - Angus Cloud
  - Zendaya
  - Jacob Elordi
- Dwyane Wade and Gabrielle Union
- Bill and Melinda Gates
- Jack Black
- Hasan Minhaj
- Andy Cohen
- Kaia Gerber and Cindy Crawford
- Keegan-Michael Key
- Martha Stewart
- Snoop Dogg
- Katelyn Ohashi
- Natalie Morales
- Lana Condor
- Tom Brady
- Russell Westbrook
- Michael Strahan
- Russell Wilson and Ciara
- Peyton Manning
- Billy Porter
- Camila Mendes
- John Mulaney
- Demi Lovato
- CNCO
- Jake Gyllenhaal
- Courtney A. Kemp
- Rupi Kaur
- Seth Rogen
- Evan Goldberg
- J. J. Abrams

== Performers ==
Artist(s)	Song(s)
Lizzo; New York Philharmonic	"Pomp and Circumstance"
AMDA College of the Performing Arts Choir; Diamond Bar High School Marching Band	"There's Nothing Holdin' Me Back"
Tracee Ellis Ross; Yara Shahidi; Kelly Rowland; Shonda Rhimes; Janelle Monáe; Madison Calley (on harp); Misty Copeland and Naya Lovell (dance)	"Still I Rise" (Maya Angelou poem recital)
Noah Cyrus; Tove Lo; Ty Dolla Sign; Khalid; Leon Bridges; Camila Cabello; Ben Platt; Cynthia Erivo; Chris Martin	"Beautiful Day" (Note: segment directed by Finneas O'Connell)
Alicia Keys	"Underdog"
Mariah Carey; The cast of Schitt's Creek Catherine O'Hara as Moira Rose; Eugene Levy as Johnny Rose; Dan Levy as David Rose; Annie Murphy as Alexis Rose; Noah Reid as Patrick Brewer; Emily Hampshire as Stevie Budd; Karen Robinson as Veronica "Ronnie" Lee; Sarah Levy as Twyla Sands; Jenn Robertson as Jocelyn Schitt; Rizwan Manji as Ray Butani	"Hero"
Maluma	"ADMV"
Chris Pine; John Cho	"Graduation Day"
Mark Hamill; Daisy Ridley	Oh, the Places You'll Go! (Dr. Seuss book excerpt reading)
Chloe x Halle	"Do It"
Katy Perry	"Daisies" "Firework"
Megan Thee Stallion	"Big Ole Freak" "Hot Girl Summer" "Captain Hook" "Cash Shit" "Savage"
CNCO	"Honey Boo" "Hey DJ" "Reggaetón Lento (Bailemos)"
BTS	"Boy with Luv" "Spring Day" "Mikrokosmos" (Performed at the National Museum of Korea in Seoul)
