= Love?... or Something Like It =

Studio album by Halle
- Released: October 24, 2025
- Recorded: 2022–2024
- Length: 41:22
- Labels: Parkwood; Columbia
- Producers: BongoByTheWay; D. Phelps; Dem Jointz; Dominic Gordon; Ervin Garcia; FreakyRob; Johan Lenox; Moritz Braun; Needlz; Neff-U; Tim Maxey; Yuli

Singles from Love?... or Something Like It
- 1. "Angel" Released: August 4, 2023; 2. "In Your Hands" Released: March 15, 2024; 3. "Because I Love You" Released: August 30, 2024; 4. "Back and Forth" Released: February 14, 2025; 5. "Braveface" Released: June 20, 2025

Love?... or Something Like It is the debut solo studio album by American singer-songwriter Halle. It was released through Parkwood Entertainment and Columbia Records on October 24, 2025. The album was preceded by the release of the singles "Because I Love You", "Back and Forth" and "Braveface". The album also includes previous solo singles "Angel" and "In Your Hands", the former being nominated at the 66th Annual Grammy Awards for Best R&B Song.

== Background and composition ==
In 2023, Halle began recording solo music while she was filming The Little Mermaid and The Color Purple, for which she recorded new songs including the Academy Award shortlisted song "Keep It Movin'". In August 2023, she published her first solo single "Angel", followed by 2024 single "In Your Hands". On October 8, 2025, Halle announced the release of her debut solo studio album, with a promotional trailer.

The album consists of fifteen tracks written by the singer herself with numerous authors and producers, including BongoByTheWay, Dem Jointz, Johan Lenox, Needlz, Sylvia Dee, Raye, Neff-U, Sid Lippman, and Sevyn Streeter, and includes four collaborations: H.E.R., GloRilla, Mariah the Scientist and her sister Chloe. Halle described the project on her social media as "a story of first love, heartbreak, and everything that comes after. [...] Once upon a time, there was a girl who believed in love. She believed everyone belonged to someone, soul for soul. All she wanted in life was to find the truest form of love. Was that even possible? And here's what happened."

== Critical reception ==
Professional ratings
Review scores
Source	Rating
Clash	7/10
Rated R&B	8.5/10
Shatter the Standards	4/5

The project has received generally-favorable reviews, with both praise for the overall darkness and warmth of the project, and slight disappointment with GloRilla's verse on "Know Bout Me".

Writer Shahzaib Hussain for the publication Clash lauded the "classic, stately feel" of the project "that feels unfamiliar in today's overcooked and underperformed world of modern R&B." Hussain further opined that while the latter half "lacks the momentum of the opening sequence of songs", these songs are "elevated by restraint and Halle's agile voice." In another positive review, writer Jamila W. from Shatter the Standards was impressed at the varied production and live instrumentation wherever possible, while recognizing the lead single "Angel" as "an affirmation of self-worth and resilience [that remains] the spiritual core of the record... merg[ing] R&B and gospel with cinematic strings and ghostly harps." Keithan Samuels from Rated R&B considered the album "a collection of songs [that] became the catharsis she needed to enter her next chapter...embark[ing] on a quest to find and hold onto love before it eventually slips away. When love is lost, [Bailey is] left to make sense of what it all meant and how it shaped who she is today...Although the diaristic lyrics reveal what lies behind the facade — insecurity, agony, helplessness — there's a strong sense of empowerment present."

== Track listing ==
All tracks are written by Halle Bailey.

Love?... or Something Like It track listing
No.	Title	Writer(s)	Producer(s)	Length
1.	"Intro"	Halle Bailey; Rob Gueringer; Sylvia Dee; Sidney Lippman; David Kenneth Phelps	D. Phelps	0:53
2.	"Overtime"	H. Bailey; Phelps	Yuli; D. Phelps; Moritz Braun	2:28
3.	"Know Bout Me" (with GloRilla)	H. Bailey; Rachel Keen; Gloria Woods; Eric Hudson; Uforo Ebong; Charles Boyd; Gerald Dickerson	BongoByTheWay; Hudson^{[a]}; Jess Jackson^{[v]}	4:01
4.	"His Type"	H. Bailey; B Che; Khari Cain	Needlz; Dominic Gordon	2:25
5.	"Heaven"	H. Bailey; Ebong; Micah Powell; Nathalia Marshall; Sevyn Streeter	BongoByTheWay	3:07
6.	"Interlude 2"	H. Bailey; Phelps; Gueringer	D. Phelps	1:12
7.	"Alone" (with Mariah the Scientist)	H. Bailey; Mariah Buckles; Phelps; Cain	Needlz; D. Phelps; Gordon	2:11
8.	"Back and Forth"	H. Bailey	Needlz; Gordon	2:04
9.	"Braveface"	H. Bailey; Keen; Lekan	BongoByTheWay; Ervin Garcia; Johan Lenox	3:03
10.	"So I Can Feel Again" (with Chlöe)	H. Bailey; Chloe Bailey; Phelps	D. Phelps; Tim Maxey; FreakyRob	2:27
11.	"In Your Hands"	H. Bailey; Dwayne Abernathy; Feli Ferraro	D. Phelps; Dem Jointz	2:51
12.	"No Warning" (featuring H.E.R.)	H. Bailey; Gabriella Wilson; Phelps	D. Phelps; Yuli; Braun	3:01
13.	"Bite Your Lip"	H. Bailey; Keen; Abernathy; Erik Griggs	Dem Jointz; Blu2th^{[a]}	4:20
14.	"Angel"	H. Bailey; Coleridge Tillman; Theron Feemster	Neff-U	3:39
15.	"Because I Love You"	H. Bailey; Keen	Dem Jointz	3:31
Total length:				41:22

Love?... or Something Like It (deluxe) track listing
No.	Title	Writer(s)	Producer(s)	Length
16.	"Leave Me Blue"	H. Bailey; Josh Royal; Kaelen Russell	Kaelen Russell	2:50
17.	"Don't Leave"	H. Bailey; C. Bailey	Scott Bridgeway; Bryan Yepes	2:32
18.	"Love or Something Like It" (featuring Lucky Daye)	H. Bailey; David Debrandon Brown; Ebong; Powell; Streeter	BongoByTheWay; Bonxublessedit; Akeel Henry^{[a]}	2:58
19.	"Potion"	H. Bailey; Kyla Moscovich	D. Phelps; Kyla Moscovich	3:39
20.	"Way Out"	H. Bailey	Scott Bridgeway; Noah Ehler	2:20

=== Notes ===
- ^{^[a]} indicates an additional producer
- ^{^[v]} indicates a vocal producer
- All tracks are stylised in all lowercase.

== Personnel ==
Credits adapted from Tidal.

=== Musicians ===
- Halle Bailey – lead vocals (all tracks), guitar (track 2)
- Emmanuel Ventura-Cruess – cello (1)
- Rob Gueringer – guitar (1)
- Madison Calley – harp (1)
- Margaux Whitney – viola (1)
- Daniel Adams – violin (1)
- Stephanie Matthews – violin (1)
- David Phelps – piano (2, 7), synthesizer (2)
- Yuli – strings (2)
- Lekan – background vocals (9)
- Kyle Mann – background vocals, bass (14)
- Sebastian Kole – background vocals (14)
- Theron Feemster – background vocals (14)

=== Technical ===
- Trey Pearce – engineering (1, 6, 7)
- Jeremy Dilli – engineering (2, 7, 10), engineering assistance (5, 6)
- Jonathan Lopez Garcia – engineering (2, 10)
- Moritz Braun – engineering (2, 12)
- Barrington Hall – engineering (3)
- Daniel Cullen – engineering (3)
- Xavier Daniel – engineering (3)
- David Escobar – engineering (4)
- Ital Schwartz – engineering (4)
- Brodie Menas – engineering (5, 6, 11)
- Dani Pampuri – engineering (5, 8, 9)
- Kaelen Russell – engineering (5)
- Christian Williams – engineering (7), engineering assistance (4)
- Stephanie D'Arcy – engineering (12)
- Blu2th – engineering (13)
- Dem Jointz – engineering (13)
- Kyle Mann – engineering (14)
- Jennifer Ortiz – engineering (15)
- Mark "Spike" Stent – mixing
- Randy Merrill – mastering
- Danforth Webster – engineering assistance (1, 2, 6, 10)
- Collin Clark – engineering assistance (2, 7, 10)
- Joel Quatrocchi – engineering assistance (2, 12)
- Jason O'Neill – engineering assistance (2)
- Juanita Manrique – engineering assistance (3)
- Kelsey Porter – engineering assistance (4)
- Cam Hogan – engineering assistance (5, 9)
- Connor MacFarland – engineering assistance (7, 11)
- Ivan Marcelo – engineering assistance (10)
- Ethan Harrelson – engineering assistance (14)
- Leif EIsemann – engineering assistance (14)
- Matt Wolach – mixing assistance
- Kieran Beardmore – mixing assistance (9, 11, 15)
