= Halle Bailey =

American singer and actress (born 2000)

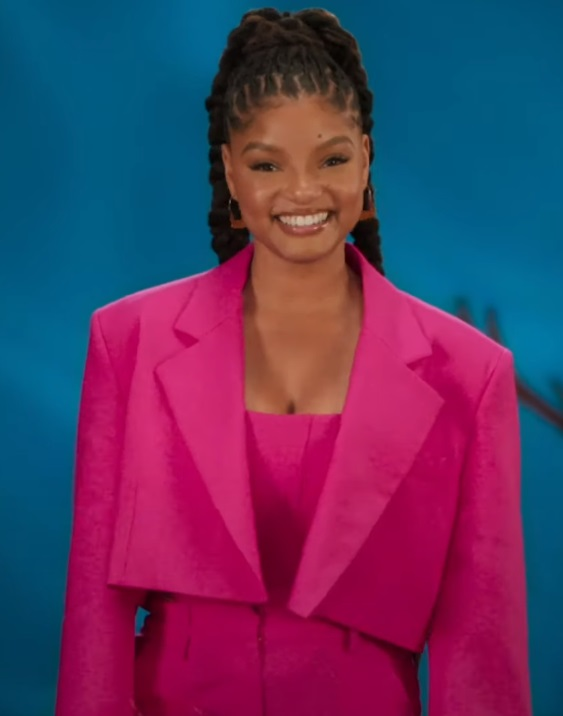
- Bailey in 2023
- Born: Halle Lynn Bailey; March 27, 2000 (age 26); Atlanta, Georgia, U.S.
- Occupations: Singer; songwriter; actress
- Years active: 2006–present
- Partner: Darryl Dwayne Granberry Jr. (2021–2024)
- Children: 1
- Relatives: Chloe Bailey (sister); Charlamagne tha God (cousin)
- Musical career
- Origin: Mableton, Georgia, U.S.
- Genres: R&B; neo soul; alternative R&B
- Instruments: Vocals; guitar
- Labels: Parkwood; Columbia
- Member of: Chloe x Halle
- Website: www.halleshappyplace.com

Halle Lynn Bailey (/ˈhæli/ HAL-ee; born March 27, 2000), also known mononymously as Halle, is an American singer-songwriter and actress. She first became known as a member of the musical duo Chloe x Halle with her sister Chloe Bailey. They have released the albums The Kids Are Alright (2018) and Ungodly Hour (2020), and have together earned five Grammy Award nominations. In 2023, Bailey released her debut solo single "Angel", which was nominated for the Grammy Award for Best R&B Song. On October 24, 2025, she released her debut solo studio album Love?... or Something Like It.

As an actress, Bailey starred in the television sitcom Grown-ish (2018–2022). In 2023, she had her first lead role as Ariel in Disney's musical fantasy film The Little Mermaid and had a supporting role in the musical film The Color Purple.

== Early life ==
Halle Lynn Bailey was born on March 27, 2000 in Atlanta, and raised in Mableton, Georgia, with her older sisters Ski Bailey (born 1991) and Chloe Bailey (born 1998), and her younger brother Branson Bailey (born 2005), moving together to Los Angeles in mid-2012. As children, Chloe and Halle wrote their own songs, learning to play instruments through watching YouTube tutorials. Their father and co-manager, Doug Bailey, taught them to write songs starting at the age of 8.

== Career ==
=== 2006–2016: Early work and record deal ===
While in Georgia, Bailey played minor acting roles in films such as Joyful Noise (2012), having begun a career in acting at the age of 3, and the Disney television film Let It Shine (2012). The duo launched a YouTube channel at the ages of 11 and 13 respectively, with a cover of Beyoncé's "Best Thing I Never Had". Their first video to go "viral" was a cover of another of Beyoncé's tracks, "Pretty Hurts". They first performed as Chloe x Halle when uploading covers of pop songs onto their channel. The duo made their talk show debut when they appeared on The Ellen Show in April 2012. In 2013, the Bailey sisters won Season 5 of Radio Disney's The Next Big Thing, with them making a cameo appearance in the Disney series Austin & Ally performing the song "Unstoppable" the following September.

In May 2015, both sisters were in talks to sign on with Parkwood Entertainment, with the contracts submitted to the Manhattan Supreme Court, as both sisters were then minors detailing that they "[would] receive at least $60,000 and advances that could total almost $1 million if they make at least six albums." Parkwood Entertainment, which was founded by Beyoncé, finally signed them in 2016 for a five-year contract, becoming "[her] first true musical successors," per NPR, as well as being considered "Beyoncé's prodigies." The Bailey sisters were featured, along with Beyoncé, twin sisters Lisa-Kainde Diaz and Naomi Diaz, Amandla Stenberg and Zendaya in the clip for Freedom in the formermost's eponymous visual album Lemonade, which premiered on HBO in April 2016.

=== 2016–2018: Rise to prominence ===
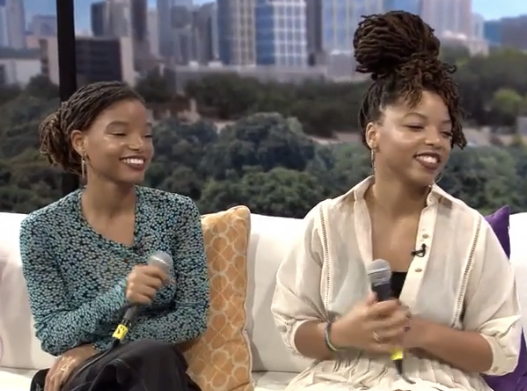
Halle (left) with her sister Chloe in 2018

Chloe x Halle made their professional debut with the EP, Sugar Symphony, which was released under Parkwood on April 29, 2016. The duo were also featured as the opening act for the European part of Beyoncé's Formation World Tour, held between late June and early August 2016.

Nearly a year after, Chloe x Halle released a mixtape, The Two of Us, on March 16, 2017, on YouTube. It was featured on Rolling Stone magazine's Best R&B Albums of 2017 list. On December 29, 2017, the duo released the theme song for the TV series Grown-ish, entitled "Grown". Halle played Skylar "Sky" Forster in a recurring capacity in the first season before being upgraded to series regular starting with the second. She departed the series at the end of the fourth season when her character graduated from college. Both "Grown" and "The Kids Are Alright" served as the lead and second singles, respectively, of Chloe x Halle's debut studio album, The Kids Are Alright, which they announced in late February 2018. The album was paired with a visual. Chloe x Halle released their debut studio album, The Kids Are Alright, on March 23, 2018, to critical acclaim. Their single, "Warrior", appeared on both the soundtrack for the film A Wrinkle in Time (2018), as well as their debut album.

On May 31, 2018, it was announced that they would be the opening act for the U.S. leg of Beyoncé and Jay-Z's On the Run II Tour, alongside DJ Khaled. The duo were nominated for two Grammy Awards in December 2018, namely Best New Artist and Best Urban Contemporary Album (for The Kids Are Alright).

On February 3, 2019, Chloe x Halle's performance of "America the Beautiful" at the Super Bowl LIII was praised by their mentor Beyoncé in addition to several news publications. A week later, on February 10, 2019, the duo honored American musician Donny Hathaway by performing his 1972 single "Where Is the Love" at the 61st Annual Grammy Awards.

On June 12, 2020, the duo released their sophomore album, Ungodly Hour, to critical acclaim. The album debuted at number 16 on the Billboard 200 chart with 24,000 units sold. "Do It" also became their first entry on the Billboard Hot 100, debuting at number 83 on the chart dated June 27, 2020. The duo later released Ungodly Hour (Chrome Edition) on February 26, 2021. The rereleased album included two new songs, '80/20' and 'Hazy'.

Chloe x Halle performed the American national anthem at the kickoff game for the 2020 NFL season in September 2020. The duo hosted the Glamour Women of the Year Awards in October 2020. In November 2020, they received nominations for Album of the Year, Song of the Year, Video of the Year, Best Dance Performance and The Ashford And Simpson Songwriter's Award at the 2020 Soul Train Music Awards. They also received nominations for Best Progressive R&B Album, Best R&B Song and Best Traditional R&B Performance at the forthcoming 63rd Annual Grammy Awards. They performed "Baby Girl" at the 2020 Billboard Women in Music ceremony, where Beyoncé presented them with the Rising Star Award.

=== 2019–present: Solo endeavors and Love?... or Something Like It ===
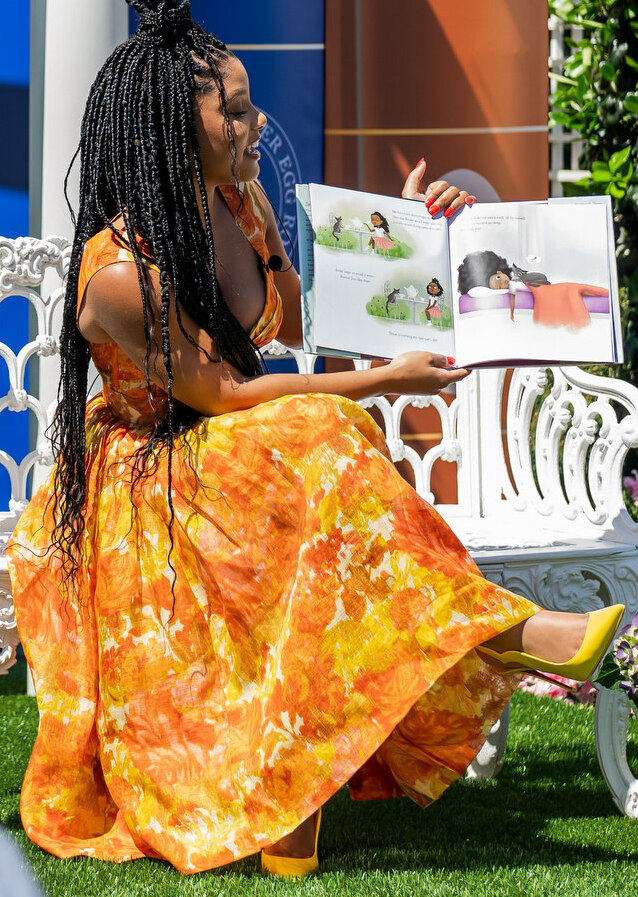
Bailey at a book reading of Hair Love during the April 2023 Easter egg roll at the White House

In July 2019, Disney announced that Bailey had been cast as Ariel, the titular mermaid, in The Little Mermaid, a live-action remake of the 1989 animated film of the same name. Following the announcement, her casting caused a backlash, with some claiming that casting an African-American in the role of Ariel was unfaithful to the original character. Director Rob Marshall said that Bailey "possesses that rare combination of spirit, heart, youth, innocence, and substance—plus a glorious singing voice—all intrinsic qualities necessary to play this iconic role". In an interview with Deadline, Marshall expressed that he was brought to tears by Bailey's singing. Explaining how "Bailey was able to embody everything else that he was looking for with Ariel...she set the bar way too high for any other hopefuls to match. In response to the criticism, Disney defended their casting and stated that Ariel "is a mermaid".

The Little Mermaid was released in May 2023. Bailey received praise from critics for her performance, earning nominations for the NAACP Image Award for Outstanding Actress in a Motion Picture, the Black Reel Award for Outstanding Breakthrough Performance, the Saturn Award for Best Performance by a Younger Actor, and the People's Choice Award for Female Movie Star of the Year. She also recorded and performed the soundtrack for the film.

On October 1, 2021, Bailey made her debut solo performance with a rendition of the Disney song "Can You Feel the Love Tonight", in the televised event, The Most Magical Story on Earth: 50 Years of Walt Disney World, which celebrated Disney World's 50th Anniversary.

In 2023, Bailey starred in the musical period drama film The Color Purple, based on stage musical of the same name. The film was directed by Blitz Bazawule and produced by Steven Spielberg, Quincy Jones, Scott Sanders and Oprah Winfrey. As a part of the ensemble cast, Bailey received the NAACP Image Award for Outstanding Ensemble Cast in a Motion Picture as well as nominations for the Screen Actors Guild Award for Outstanding Performance by a Cast in a Motion Picture and the Critics' Choice Movie Award for Best Acting Ensemble. Bailey played the role of young Nettie and performed four songs on the soundtrack, including the promotional single "Keep It Movin''", which won the Black Reel Award for Outstanding Original Song and was shortlisted for Best Original Song at the 96th Academy Awards.

On August 4, 2023, Bailey's debut single as a solo artist, "Angel", was released. The song was nominated at the 66th Annual Grammy Awards for Best R&B Song. On March 15, 2024, she released her second solo single, "In Your Hands". Her third single "Because I Love You", which was co-written by British singer-songwriter RAYE, was released on August 30, 2024. Bailey released her debut studio album, Love?... or Something Like It, on October 24, 2025.

== Personal life ==
Bailey began a relationship with DDG, an American YouTuber and rapper, in December 2021. On December 22, 2023, Bailey gave birth to their son. On October 3, 2024, DDG announced that he and Bailey had split after almost three years of dating but would continue to be "best friends" and raise their son together. In May 2025, Bailey was granted a restraining order against DDG, following allegations of abuse. She was also granted temporary physical and legal custody of their son. DDG, who was granted his own temporary restraining order against Bailey, filed a motion to prevent her from leaving the U.S. with their son, claiming Bailey was a "risk" to herself and their child, but was denied until a further hearing.

== Artistry ==
Bailey's musical influences came from jazz and listening to Billie Holiday from a young age. She has cited the singer as one of the major influences on her vocals. In addition to her singing, she plays the guitar.

== Discography ==
=== Studio albums ===
List of studio albums, with details
| Title | Details |
|---|---|
| Love?... or Something Like It | Released: October 24, 2025; Label: Parkwood, Columbia; Format: Digital download, streaming |

=== Singles ===
==== As lead artist ====
List of singles as lead artist, showing year released, with selected chart positions and album name
| Title | Year | Peak chart positions | | | | Album |
| Title | Year | US Bub. | US R&B Dig. | NZ Hot | UK Sales | Album |
|---|---|---|---|---|---|---|
| "Angel" | 2023 | 21 | 6 | 13 | 70 | Love?... or Something Like It |
| "In Your Hands" | 2024 | — | 9 | 16 | — | Love?... or Something Like It |
| "Because I Love You" | 2024 | — | 11 | — | — | Love?... or Something Like It |
| "Back and Forth" | 2025 | — | — | — | — | Love?... or Something Like It |
| "Braveface" | 2025 | — | — (Note: "Braveface" did not enter the Billboard R&B/Hip-Hop Digital Song Sales chart, but peaked at No. 9 on the R&B Digital Song Sales chart.) | — | — | Love?... or Something Like It |
"—" denotes a recording that did not chart or was not released.

==== Promotional singles ====
List of promotional singles, showing year released, with selected chart positions and album name
| Title | Year | Peak chart positions | | | | Album |
| Title | Year | US Bub. | NZ Hot | UK Sales | UK DL | Album |
|---|---|---|---|---|---|---|
| "Part of Your World" | 2023 | 19 | 12 | 58 | 57 | The Little Mermaid |
| "Keep It Movin'" (with Phylicia Pearl Mpasi) | 2023 | — | — | — | — | The Color Purple |
"—" denotes a recording that did not chart or was not released.

=== Guest appearances ===
List of other appearances, showing year released, other artist(s) credited and album name
| Title | Year | Other artist(s) | Album |
|---|---|---|---|
| "Part of Your World (Reprise)" | 2023 | None | The Little Mermaid |
| "For the First Time" | 2023 | None | The Little Mermaid |
| "Part of Your World (Reprise II)" | 2023 | None | The Little Mermaid |
| "Huckleberry Pie" | 2023 | Phylicia Pearl Mpasi | The Color Purple |
| "Mysterious Ways" | 2023 | Tamela Mann, David Alan Grier, The Color Purple Ensemble | The Color Purple |
| "Keep Pushin' (Missy Elliott Remix)" | 2023 | Missy Elliott | The Color Purple |
| "Want Me" | 2024 | Chlöe | Trouble in Paradise |
| "Soft (Unlocked)" | 2024 | Flo, Chlöe | Access All Areas: Unlocked |
| "Rather Be Alone" | 2025 | Leon Thomas III | MUTT Deluxe: Heel |

== Videos appeared in ==
=== Music videos ===
List of music videos, showing year released, other artist(s) credited and director(s)
| Title | Year | Other artist(s) | Director |
As lead artist
| "Part of Your World" | 2023 | None | Rob Marshall |
| "Angel" | 2023 | None | Wendy Morgan |
| "In Your Hands" | 2024 | None | Anastasia Delmark |
| "Because I Love You" | 2024 | None | Allie Avital |
Guest appearances
| "If I Want You" | 2022 | DDG | Nick Mays |
| "It's Givin" | 2022 | Latto | Chandler Lass |

== Filmography ==
=== Film ===
Key
| † | Denotes films that have not yet been released |

| Year | Title | Role | Notes | Ref. |
|---|---|---|---|---|
| 2006 | Last Holiday | Tina | | |
| 2012 | Let It Shine | Choir Member | | |
| 2016 | Beyoncé: Lemonade | Cameo | Segment: "All Night" intro | |
| 2018 | The Kids Are Alright | Herself | Short film | |
| 2021 | Why the Sun and the Moon Live in the Sky | Sun | Short film | |
| 2021 | Halle Bailey presented by Fendi | Herself | Short film | |
| 2023 | The Little Mermaid | Ariel | | |
| 2023 | The Line | Annabelle Bascom | | |
| 2023 | The Color Purple | Young Nettie Harris | | |
| 2024 | Golden | —N/a | Unreleased | |
| 2026 | You, Me & Tuscany | Anna Montgomery | | |
| 2026 | The Debut | Stef | | |
| TBA | Michael 2 † | Janet Jackson | | |

=== Television ===
| Year | Title | Role | Notes | Ref. |
|---|---|---|---|---|
| 2007 | Tyler Perry's House of Payne | Tiffany | Episode: "Why Can't We Be Friends" | |
| 2012 | The Ellen Show | Herself | Episode dated: "April 9, 2012" | |
| 2013 | Austin & Ally | Herself | Episode: "Moon Week & Mentors" | |
| 2018 | Wild 'n Out | Herself | Episode: "Chloe x Halle" | |
| 2018–2022 | Grown-ish | Skylar "Sky" Forster | Main role (1–3), recurring role (season 4) | |
| 2020 | The Disney Family Singalong: Volume II | Herself | Television special | |
| 2020 | The Kelly Clarkson Show | Herself | Episode dated: "July 9, 2020" | |
| 2020 | The Disney Holiday Singalong | Herself | Television special | |
| 2021 | The Most Magical Story on Earth: 50 Years of Walt Disney World | Herself | Television special; performed "Can You Feel the Love Tonight" | |
| 2022 | Dick Clark's New Year's Rockin' Eve with Ryan Seacrest 2023 | Herself | Television special; performed "Cool People" and "Together Again" | |

== Awards and nominations ==
| Year | Award | Category | Work | Result | Ref. |
|---|---|---|---|---|---|
| 2019 | Grammy Awards | Best New Artist | Chloe x Halle | Nominated | |
| 2019 | Grammy Awards | Best Urban Contemporary Album | "The Kids Are Alright" | Nominated | |
| 2020 | NAACP Image Awards | Outstanding Supporting Actress in a Comedy Series | Grown-ish | Nominated | |
| 2021 | Grammy Awards | Best Progressive R&B Album | "Ungodly Hour" | Nominated | |
| 2021 | Grammy Awards | Best R&B Song | "Do It" | Nominated | |
| 2021 | Grammy Awards | Best Traditional R&B Performance | "Wonder What She Thinks of Me" | Nominated | |
| 2023 | Innovators & Leaders Awards | Innovators of the Year Award | Herself | Won | |
| 2023 | Bulletin Awards | Best Actress in a Motion Picture | The Little Mermaid | Won | |
| 2023 | Glamour Awards | Gamechanger of the Year | Herself | Won | |
| 2023 | Hollywood Music in Media Awards | Best Song – Onscreen Performance (Film) | "For The First Time" from The Little Mermaid | Nominated | |
| 2023 | Hollywood Music in Media Awards | Best Song – Onscreen Performance (Film) | "Keep It Movin'" from The Color Purple | Nominated | |
| 2023 | Hollywood Music in Media Awards | Original Song — Feature Film | "Keep It Movin'" from The Color Purple | Nominated | |
| 2023 | Celebration of Cinema and Television | Ensemble Award – Film | The Color Purple | Won | |
| 2024 | Screen Actors Guild Awards | Outstanding Performance by a Cast in a Motion Picture | The Color Purple | Nominated | |
| 2024 | Astra Film and Creative Awards | Best Cast Ensemble | The Color Purple | Won | |
| 2024 | Critics' Choice Movie Award | Best Acting Ensemble | The Color Purple | Nominated | |
| 2024 | Black Reel Awards | Outstanding Original Song | "Keep It Movin" | Won | |
| 2024 | Black Reel Awards | Outstanding Breakthrough Performance | The Little Mermaid | Nominated | |
| 2024 | Saturn Awards | Best Performance by a Younger Actor | The Little Mermaid | Nominated | |
| 2024 | People's Choice Awards | Female Movie Star of the Year | The Little Mermaid | Nominated | |
| 2024 | NAACP Image Awards | Entertainer of the Year | Herself | Nominated | |
| 2024 | NAACP Image Awards | Outstanding Actress in a Motion Picture | The Little Mermaid | Nominated | |
| 2024 | NAACP Image Awards | Outstanding Ensemble Cast in a Motion Picture | The Color Purple | Won | |
| 2024 | NAACP Image Awards | Outstanding Supporting Actress in a Motion Picture | The Color Purple | Nominated | |
| 2024 | Grammy Awards | Best R&B Song | "Angel" | Nominated | |
| 2024 | BET Awards | Best Actress | Herself | Nominated | |
| 2024 | BET Awards | Dr. Bobby Jones Best Gospel/Inspirational Award | "Angel" | Nominated | |
| 2024 | 2024 Kids' Choice Awards | Favorite Movie Actress | Herself | Nominated | |
