= 2020 MTV Video Music Awards =

2020 Award Show

- Date: Sunday, August 30, 2020
- Venue: MTV Headquarters (New York City, New York)
- Country: United States
- Hosted by: Keke Palmer

Highlights
- Most awards: Lady Gaga (5)
- Most nominations: Lady Gaga; Ariana Grande (9 each)
- Website: mtv.com/vma

Television/radio coverage
- Network: MTV; The CW; MTV2; VH1; BET; Nick at Nite; CMT; Comedy Central; Paramount Network; TV Land; BET Her; Pop TV; Logo TV
- Viewership: 6.4 million
- Produced by: Bruce Gillmer; Jesse Ignjatovic
- Directed by: Dave Diomedi; Sam Wrench

The 2020 MTV Video Music Awards were held on August 30, 2020. Keke Palmer hosted the 37th annual ceremony, which was presented primarily from New York City, but with a virtual ceremony due to the COVID-19 pandemic.

Lady Gaga was the most awarded act of the night with five awards, as well as the most nominated alongside Ariana Grande, with both artists receiving nine nominations each. Gaga was presented with the inaugural MTV Tricon Award for achievements in three or more fields of entertainment. The longlist of nominees for Push Best New Artist were revealed on July 23, 2020; nominees for other categories were announced on July 30. Fan voting began on July and ended on August 23. Nominees for Song of Summer, Best Group and Everyday Heroes: Frontline Medical Workers were released on August 24. The show was dedicated to Chadwick Boseman, who died of colon cancer two days before the ceremony.

The ceremony was aired by MTV and simulcast across other ViacomCBS cable networks. For the first time, the ceremony was also carried on broadcast television in the U.S. via co-owned The CW. The show received 6.4 million viewers in its first-run viewing (excluding livestreams through network apps), a 5% decrease from the 6.8 million viewers at the previous ceremony.

== Ceremony information ==
The awards were originally scheduled to return to the Barclays Center for the first time since 2013. Due to the COVID-19 pandemic, the event was expected to be held with "limited or no audience", as one of the first major indoor events to be held in the city since the onset of the pandemic in the state, with MTV also announcing plans for the show to "[span] all five boroughs" to "pay homage to the strength, spirit and incredible resilience of NYC and its beloved residents".

MTV eventually scrapped the indoor component of the ceremony at Barclays after "close consultation with state and local health officials" and announced that it would be conducted in an outdoor format across the city; the arena in Brooklyn would subsequently host the 2021 event instead. The majority of performances were pre-recorded either in New York City (with locations such as Hudson Yards and a drive-in theatre in Brooklyn), or on a chroma key set in Los Angeles for acts unable to travel to New York City. BTS likewise filmed their performance on a chroma key set in Seoul, South Korea.

New one-off award categories for "Quarantine Performance" and "Best Music Video from Home" were added on July 30 in light of the ongoing pandemic. Three additional categories were announced on August 24: Song of Summer, Best Group and "Everyday Heroes: Frontline Medical Workers", with the latter created "to celebrate performances by COVID-19 first responders".

In addition to the ViacomCBS family of networks, the VMAs were also simulcast on terrestrial television by The CW (a joint venture of ViacomCBS and WarnerMedia). The CW also aired a post-show recap special, composed mostly of pre-show performance footage.

== Performances ==
List of musical performances
| Artist(s) | Song(s) |
Pre-show
| Jack Harlow | "Whats Poppin" |
| Tate McRae | "You Broke Me First" |
| Chloe x Halle | "Ungodly Hour" |
| Lewis Capaldi | "Before You Go" |
| Machine Gun Kelly; Blackbear; Travis Barker | Medley "My Ex's Best Friend" "Bloody Valentine" |
Main show
| The Weeknd | "Blinding Lights" |
| DaBaby | Medley "Peep Hole" "Blind" "Rockstar" |
| Miley Cyrus | "Midnight Sky" |
| Maluma | "Hawái" |
| BTS | "Dynamite" |
| Lady Gaga; Ariana Grande | Tricon Award Chromatica Medley "Chromatica II" "911" "Rain on Me" "Stupid Love" |
| JP Saxe; Julia Michaels | "If the World Was Ending" |
| Doja Cat | Medley "Say So" "Like That" |
| Keke Palmer | "Snack" |
| CNCO | "Beso" |
| Black Eyed Peas; Nicky Jam; Tyga | Medley "Vida Loca" "I Gotta Feeling" |

J Balvin and Roddy Ricch were initially announced as performers on August 4 and 11 respectively, but later pulled out of the event.

== Presenters ==
Presenters were announced on August 27.

=== Pre-show ===
- Travis Mills – presented Best Alternative
- Nessa and Jamila Mustafa – presented Best Group and Best K-Pop

=== Main show ===
- Jaden Smith – presented Best Collaboration
- Drew Barrymore – presented Best Direction
- Anthony Ramos – presented Best Latin
- Joey King – presented Song of the Year
- Madison Beer – presented Best Music Video from Home
- Nicole Richie – presented Best Pop and Best R&B
- Kelly Clarkson – presented Artist of the Year
- Sofia Carson – presented Video for Good
- Bella Hadid – presented the Tricon Award
- Travis Barker – presented Best Hip Hop and introduced the "In Memoriam" segment
- Machine Gun Kelly – presented Push Best New Artist
- Bebe Rexha – presented Video of the Year

== Winners and nominees ==
On July 23, 2020, seventeen Push Best New Artist pre-nominees were announced. Fan voting for most categories took place from July 30 to August 23. Nominees for most other categories were revealed on July 30. Nominations for remaining categories were announced August 24. The Push Best New Artist category was narrowed down to three finalists on August 24 and voting moved to Twitter, where it continued until August 28. Voting for Best Group and Song of Summer ran from August 24–26 and August 26–28 respectively, and took place via MTV's Instagram stories. Lady Gaga was the most-awarded nominee with five wins, followed by Ariana Grande and BTS with four each.

Winners are listed first and highlighted in bold.

| Video of the Year | Song of the Year |
|---|---|
| **The Weeknd – "Blinding Lights"**; Billie Eilish – "Everything I Wanted"; Eminem (featuring Juice Wrld) – "Godzilla"; Future (featuring Drake) – "Life Is Good"; Lady Gaga with Ariana Grande – "Rain on Me"; Taylor Swift – "The Man" | **Lady Gaga with Ariana Grande – "Rain on Me"**; Doja Cat – "Say So"; Billie Eilish – "Everything I Wanted"; Megan Thee Stallion – "Savage"; Post Malone – "Circles"; Roddy Ricch – "The Box" |
| Artist of the Year | Best Group |
| **Lady Gaga**; Justin Bieber; DaBaby; Megan Thee Stallion; Post Malone; The Weeknd | **BTS**; Now United; 5 Seconds of Summer; Blackpink; Chloe x Halle; CNCO; Little Mix; Monsta X; The 1975; Twenty One Pilots |
| Push Best New Artist | Best Collaboration |
| **Doja Cat**; Lewis Capaldi; Jack Harlow; Tate McRae; Roddy Ricch; Yungblud | **Lady Gaga with Ariana Grande – "Rain on Me"**; Black Eyed Peas (featuring J Balvin) – "Ritmo (Bad Boys for Life)"; Future (featuring Drake) – "Life Is Good"; Ariana Grande and Justin Bieber – "Stuck with U"; Karol G and Nicki Minaj – "Tusa"; Ed Sheeran (featuring Khalid) – "Beautiful People" |
| Best Pop | Best Hip Hop |
| **BTS – "On"**; Justin Bieber (featuring Quavo) – "Intentions"; Halsey – "You Should Be Sad"; Jonas Brothers – "What a Man Gotta Do"; Lady Gaga with Ariana Grande – "Rain on Me"; Taylor Swift – "Lover" | **Megan Thee Stallion – "Savage"**; DaBaby – "Bop"; Eminem (featuring Juice Wrld) – "Godzilla"; Future (featuring Drake) – "Life Is Good"; Roddy Ricch – "The Box"; Travis Scott – "Highest in the Room" |
| Best R&B | Best K-Pop |
| **The Weeknd – "Blinding Lights"**; Chloe x Halle – "Do It"; H.E.R. (featuring YG) – "Slide"; Alicia Keys – "Underdog"; Khalid (featuring Summer Walker) – "Eleven"; Lizzo – "Cuz I Love You" | **BTS – "On"**; Exo – "Obsession"; (G)I-dle – "Oh My God"; Monsta X – "Someone's Someone"; Red Velvet – "Psycho"; TXT – "9 and Three Quarters (Run Away)" |
| Best Latin | Best Rock |
| **Maluma (featuring J Balvin) – "Qué Pena"**; Anuel AA (featuring Daddy Yankee, Ozuna, Karol G and J Balvin) – "China"; Bad Bunny – "Yo Perreo Sola"; J Balvin – "Amarillo"; Black Eyed Peas (featuring Ozuna and J. Rey Soul) – "Mamacita"; Karol G and Nicki Minaj – "Tusa" | **Coldplay – "Orphans"**; blink-182 – "Happy Days"; Evanescence – "Wasted on You"; Fall Out Boy (featuring Wyclef Jean) – "Dear Future Self (Hands Up)"; Green Day – "Oh Yeah!"; The Killers – "Caution" |
| Best Alternative | Best Music Video from Home |
| **Machine Gun Kelly – "Bloody Valentine"**; The 1975 – "If You're Too Shy (Let Me Know)"; All Time Low – "Some Kind of Disaster"; Lana Del Rey – "Doin' Time"; FINNEAS – "Let's Fall in Love for the Night"; twenty one pilots – "Level of Concern" | **Ariana Grande and Justin Bieber – "Stuck with U"**; 5 Seconds of Summer – "Wildflower"; blink-182 – "Happy Days"; Drake – "Toosie Slide"; John Legend – "Bigger Love"; twenty one pilots – "Level of Concern" |
| Best Quarantine Performance | Video for Good |
| **CNCO – MTV Unplugged at Home**; Chloe x Halle – "Do It" (from MTV Prom-Athon); DJ D-Nice – Club MTV Presents: #DanceTogether; Lady Gaga – "Smile" (from One World: Together At Home); John Legend – #TogetherAtHome Concert Series; Post Malone – "Nirvana Tribute" | **H.E.R. – "I Can't Breathe"**; Billie Eilish – "All the Good Girls Go to Hell"; Lil Baby – "The Bigger Picture"; Demi Lovato – "I Love Me"; Anderson Paak – "Lockdown"; Taylor Swift – "The Man" |
| Best Direction | Best Art Direction |
| **Taylor Swift – "The Man" (Director: Taylor Swift)**; Doja Cat – "Say So" (Director: Hannah Lux Davis); Billie Eilish – "Xanny" (Director: Billie Eilish); Dua Lipa – "Don't Start Now" (Director: Nabil); Harry Styles – "Adore You" (Director: Dave Meyers); The Weeknd – "Blinding Lights" (Director: Anton Tammi) | **Miley Cyrus – "Mother's Daughter" (Art Director: Christian Stone)**; A$AP Rocky – "Babushka Boi" (Art Directors: A$AP Rocky, Nadia Lee Cohen and Brittany Porter); Selena Gomez – "Boyfriend" (Art Director: Tatiana Van Sauter); Dua Lipa – "Physical" (Art Director: Anna Colomé Nogu); Harry Styles – "Adore You" (Art Director: Laura Ellis Cricks); Taylor Swift – "Lover" (Art Director: Kurt Gefke) |
| Best Choreography | Best Cinematography |
| **BTS – "On" (Choreographers: The Lab and Son Sung Deuk)**; CNCO and Natti Natasha – "Honey Boo" (Choreographer: Kyle Hanagami); DaBaby – "Bop" (Choreographers: DaniLeigh and Cherry); Lady Gaga with Ariana Grande – "Rain on Me" (Choreographer: Richy Jackson); Dua Lipa – "Physical" (Choreographer: Charm La'Donna); Normani – "Motivation" (Choreographer: Sean Bankhead) | **Lady Gaga with Ariana Grande – "Rain on Me" (Director of Photography: Michael Merriman)**; 5 Seconds of Summer – "Old Me" (Director of Photography: Kieran Fowler); Camila Cabello (featuring DaBaby) – "My Oh My" (Director of Photography: Scott Cunningham); Billie Eilish – "All the Good Girls Go to Hell" (Director of Photography: Christopher Probst); Katy Perry – "Harleys in Hawaii" (Director of Photography: Arnau Valls); The Weeknd – "Blinding Lights" (Director of Photography: Oliver Millar) |
| Best Editing | Best Visual Effects |
| **Miley Cyrus – "Mother's Daughter" (Editors: Alexandre Moors and Nuno Xico)**; James Blake – "Can't Believe the Way We Flow" (Editor: Frank Lebon); Halsey – "Graveyard" (Editors: Emille Aubry, Janne Vartia and Tim Montana); Lizzo – "Good as Hell" (Editors: Russell Santos and Sofia Kerpan); Rosalía – "A Palé" (Editor: Andre Jones); The Weeknd – "Blinding Lights" (Editors: Janne Vartia and Tim Montana) | **Dua Lipa – "Physical" (Visual Effects: EIGHTY4 and Mathematic)**; Billie Eilish – "All the Good Girls Go to Hell" (Visual Effects: Drive Studio); Lady Gaga with Ariana Grande – "Rain on Me" (Visual Effects: Ingenuity Studios); Demi Lovato – "I Love Me" (Visual Effects: Hoody FX); Travis Scott – "Highest in the Room" (Visual Effects: Ingenuity Studios); Harry Styles – "Adore You" (Visual Effects: Mathematic) |
| Song of Summer | Everyday Heroes: Frontline Medical Workers |
| **Blackpink – "How You Like That"**; Cardi B (featuring Megan Thee Stallion) – "WAP"; Miley Cyrus – "Midnight Sky"; DaBaby (featuring Roddy Ricch) – "Rockstar"; DJ Khaled (featuring Drake) – "Popstar"; Doja Cat – "Say So"; Jack Harlow – "Whats Poppin"; Lil Baby (featuring 42 Dugg) – "We Paid"; Dua Lipa – "Break My Heart"; Megan Thee Stallion (featuring Beyoncé) – "Savage (Remix)"; Pop Smoke (featuring 50 Cent and Roddy Ricch) – "The Woo"; Saint Jhn – "Roses"; Saweetie – "Tap In"; Harry Styles – "Watermelon Sugar"; Taylor Swift – "Cardigan"; The Weeknd – "Blinding Lights" | **Jason "TikTok Doc" Campbell**; **Dr. Elvis Francois and Dr. William Robinson – "Imagine"**; **Jefferson University Hospital's Swab Squad – "Level Up"**; **Lori Marie Key – "Amazing Grace"**; **Dr. Nate Wood – "Lean on Me"** |
MTV Tricon Award
**Lady Gaga**

== Artists with multiple wins and nominations ==
Artists who received multiple awards
| Wins | Artist |
|---|---|
| 5 | Lady Gaga |
| 4 | Ariana Grande |
| 4 | BTS |
| 2 | Miley Cyrus |
| 2 | The Weeknd |

Artists who received multiple nominations
| Nominations | Artist |
|---|---|
| 9 | Lady Gaga |
| 9 | Ariana Grande |
| 7 | The Weeknd |
| 6 | Billie Eilish |
| 6 | Taylor Swift |
| 5 | DaBaby |
| 5 | Drake |
| 5 | Dua Lipa |
| 5 | Megan Thee Stallion |
| 5 | Roddy Ricch |
| 4 | BTS |
| 4 | Doja Cat |
| 4 | Harry Styles |
| 4 | J Balvin |
| 4 | Justin Bieber |
| 3 | 5 Seconds of Summer |
| 3 | Chloe x Halle |
| 3 | CNCO |
| 3 | Future |
| 3 | Karol G |
| 3 | Miley Cyrus |
| 3 | Post Malone |
| 3 | Twenty One Pilots |
| 2 | The 1975 |
| 2 | Black Eyed Peas |
| 2 | Blackpink |
| 2 | blink-182 |
| 2 | Demi Lovato |
| 2 | Eminem |
| 2 | Halsey |
| 2 | H.E.R. |
| 2 | Jack Harlow |
| 2 | John Legend |
| 2 | Juice Wrld |
| 2 | Khalid |
| 2 | Lil Baby |
| 2 | Lizzo |
| 2 | Monsta X |
| 2 | Nicki Minaj |
| 2 | Ozuna |
| 2 | Travis Scott |

== Music Videos with multiple wins and nominations ==
Music Videos that received multiple awards
| Wins | Artist(s) | Music Video |
|---|---|---|
| 3 | BTS | "On" |
| 3 | Lady Gaga with Ariana Grande | "Rain on Me" |
| 2 | Miley Cyrus | "Mother's Daughter" |
| 2 | The Weeknd | "Blinding Lights" |

Music Videos that received multiple nominations
| Nominations | Artist(s) | Music Video |
|---|---|---|
| 7 | Lady Gaga with Ariana Grande | "Rain on Me" |
| 6 | The Weeknd | "Blinding Lights" |
| 3 | Billie Eilish | "All the Good Girls Go to Hell" |
| 3 | BTS | "On" |
| 3 | Doja Cat | "Say So" |
| 3 | Dua Lipa | "Physical" |
| 3 | Future (featuring Drake) | "Life Is Good" |
| 3 | Harry Styles | "Adore You" |
| 3 | Taylor Swift | "The Man" |
| 2 | Ariana Grande & Justin Bieber | "Stuck with U" |
| 2 | Billie Eilish | "Everything I Wanted" |
| 2 | blink-182 | "Happy Days" |
| 2 | DaBaby | "Bop" |
| 2 | Demi Lovato | "I Love Me" |
| 2 | Eminem (featuring Juice Wrld) | "Godzilla" |
| 2 | Karol G and Nicki Minaj | "Tusa" |
| 2 | Megan Thee Stallion | "Savage" |
| 2 | Miley Cyrus | "Mother's Daughter" |
| 2 | Roddy Ricch | "The Box" |
| 2 | Taylor Swift | "Lover" |
| 2 | Travis Scott | "Highest in the Room" |
| 2 | Twenty One Pilots | "Level of Concern" |
