= Do It (Chloe x Halle song) =

2020 single by Chloe x Halle

Single by Chloe x Halle

from the album Ungodly Hour
- Released: May 14, 2020
- Recorded: 2019
- Genre: R&B; trap
- Length: 2:56
- Label: Parkwood; Columbia
- Composers: Chlöe; Scott Storch; Vincent van den Ende; Anton Kühl-Jørgensen
- Lyricists: Chlöe; Halle; Victoria Monét
- Producer: Scott Storch

Chloe x Halle singles chronology
"Catch Up" (2020)	"Do It" (2020)	"Forgive Me" (2020)

Music video
- "Do It" on YouTube

"Do It" is a song by American duo Chloe x Halle, released on May 14, 2020, as the second single from their second studio album Ungodly Hour (2020). It was written by Chloe, Halle, and Victoria Monét, as well as Vincent van den Ende and Scott Storch, who handled the production. An accompanying music video directed by C Prinz was released on May 15, 2020. In the video, the sisters perform coordinated choreography while wearing a number of glittering outfits. The duo also created a dance challenge for the song on the popular video sharing app TikTok in 2020. A remix of the song with Doja Cat featuring City Girls and Latto was released on September 4, 2020.

"Do It" became the duo's first song to achieve major chart success in the US, becoming their first entry on the Billboard Hot 100, where it peaked at number 63. Pitchfork ranked the song at number 15 on their list of the 100 Best Songs of 2020. At the 2021 ceremony, the song received a Grammy Award nomination for Best R&B Song.

== Background and composition ==
"Do It" was written by Chloe and Halle Bailey, Victoria Monét, Scott Storch, Avedon and Anton Kuehl-Joergensen. The song was produced by Storch, with co-production by Avedon and Asoteric. The song's main concept is about getting dressed up and partying with your friends. According to the duo, "Do It" is meant to send a positive and uplifting message amid the current circumstances of the world. "During this time, music brings a lot of healing," Chloe x Halle said, per a press release. They further elaborated: "We hope this song inspires someone to get up and dance, shake all the stress and anxiety away, and to 'Do It' as the song says. We felt so good writing a song that will make people wanna bop to it and lift their spirits."

"Do It" is a song set in common time with an energy-filled tempo of 83 beats per minute. The song is written in the key of F minor. A preview video of the duo singing the chorus of "Do It" was uploaded via TikTok on May 12, 2020.

== Critical reception ==
"Do It" received acclaim from music critics. Ebone Chatman of Black Hollywood Live called it "the perfect summer anthem". Deep Shah of Color X Studios praised the duo's musical sound and smooth R&B style, saying that the song serves as "another sublime slice of the pair's sultry and silky smooth R&B". In his review for Entertainment Weekly, Eli Enis declared the song as the duo's "most danceable track yet", and said it is "something you can stripper-kick around the house to while still enjoying their uniquely complex harmonies." HotNewHipHop labeled the song as having a "smooth, easy-going nature". Mike Wass of Idolator described the song as a "party jam" and a "feel-good bop". Uproxx's Carolyn Droke wrote: "The duo's mesmerizing harmonization melts over a fluttering backbeat". Droke highlighted the lyrics "I beat my face / Moving fast 'cause the Uber on the way / Taking pictures make sure you can't see no lace", which the duo "croon at the single's hook".

== Music video ==
A music video for "Do It" was released on May 15, 2020, a day after the song's release. It was directed by C Prinz, while production was handled by Freenjoy Productions and choreography was handled by Kendra Bracy and Ashanti Ledo. Andrew Makadsi served as the video's creative director.

== Accolades ==
Year	Ceremony	Award	Result	Ref.
2020	MTV Video Music Awards	Best R&B	Nominated	
2020	MTV Video Music Awards	Best Quarantine Performance	Nominated	
2020	Soul Train Music Awards	Song of the Year	Nominated	
2020	Soul Train Music Awards	The Ashford And Simpson Songwriter's Award	Nominated	
2020	Soul Train Music Awards	Best Dance Performance	Nominated	
2020	Soul Train Music Awards	Video of the Year	Nominated	
2021	Grammy Awards	Best R&B Song	Nominated	
2021	NAACP Image Awards	Outstanding Duo, Group or Collaboration (Contemporary)	Nominated	
2021	NAACP Image Awards	Outstanding Music Video/Visual Album	Nominated	
2021	NAACP Image Awards	Outstanding Soul/R&B Song	Won	
2021	iHeartRadio Music Awards	Favorite Music Video Choreography	Nominated	
2021	BET Awards	Video of the Year	Nominated	

== Live performances ==
Chloe x Halle first performed "Do It" at the Dear Class of 2020 virtual commencement event on June 6, 2020, which premiered via YouTube. The performance was broadcast from their backyard with both of them wearing custom cage dresses designed by Zana Bayne, created with stylist Zerina Akers, in white leather paired with latex undergarments, by Venus Prototype. On June 16, 2020, Chloe x Halle performed the song on The Today Show. On June 28, 2020, they performed the song at the BET Awards 2020. On August 3, 2020, they performed the song during the 31st GLAAD Media Awards with drag queens Mayhem Miller, Naomi Smalls, and Vanessa Vanjie Mateo. "Do It" was also performed during the duo's NPR Tiny Desk Concert, released on December 8, 2020, and during NBC's New Year's Eve 2021 special on December 31, 2020.

== Chart performance ==
The song peaked at number 3 on the R&B Digital Song Sales chart, making it their first top five hit on that chart. The song debuted at number 83 on the Billboard Hot 100 on the week dated June 27, 2020, becoming the duo's first and only entry on the chart overall. The song fell off of the chart after three weeks, however, it would re-enter and peak at number 63 on the week dated September 19, 2020.

== Charts ==
=== Weekly charts ===
Chart performance for the solo version of "Do It"
Chart (2020)	Peak position
Global 200 (Billboard)	135
New Zealand Hot Singles (RMNZ)	20
US Billboard Hot 100	63
US Hot R&B/Hip-Hop Songs (Billboard)	23
US R&B/Hip-Hop Airplay (Billboard)	6
US Rhythmic Airplay (Billboard)	17
US Rolling Stone Top 100	75

=== Year-end charts ===
Year-end chart performance for the original version of "Do It"
Chart (2020)	Position
US Hot R&B/Hip-Hop Songs (Billboard)	92

== Certifications ==
Region	Certification	Certified units/sales
Brazil (Pro-Música Brasil)	Platinum	40,000^{‡}
United States (RIAA)	Platinum	1,000,000^{‡}
^{‡} Sales+streaming figures based on certification alone.

== Remix ==
"Do It" (remix)

Single by Chloe x Halle featuring Doja Cat, City Girls, and Latto
- Released: September 4, 2020
- Recorded: 2020
- Genre: R&B; trap
- Length: 4:17
- Label: Parkwood; Columbia
- Composers: Chloe Bailey; Scott Storch; Vincent van den Ende; Anton Kühl-Jørgensen
- Lyricists: Chloe Bailey; Halle Bailey; Victoria Monét; Amala Dlamini; Caresha Brownlee; Jatavia Johnson; Alyssa Stephens
- Producers: Storch; Chloe Bailey

Chloe x Halle singles chronology
"Forgive Me" (2020)	"Do It" (remix) (2020)	"Ungodly Hour" (2021)

Doja Cat singles chronology
"Shimmy" (2020)	"Do It" (remix) (2020)	"Del Mar" (2020)

City Girls singles chronology
"Pussy Talk" (2020)	"Do It" (remix) (2020)	"Said Sum" (remix) (2020)

Latto singles chronology
"Wake Up" (2020)	"Do It" (remix) / "Down" (2020)	"On God" (2020)

At midnight on September 4, 2020, a remix of "Do It" featuring American rappers Doja Cat, City Girls, and Latto was released with no official prior announcement. However, its imminent release was hinted at by the collaborators over social media within hours before its release.

=== Composition and lyrics ===
The "Do It" remix includes new verses from all members on the track, with Clash referring to the song as being "torn to pieces and re-assembled by Doja Cat, City Girls and Mulatto." The artists are included in the intro of the song, using their taglines, such as City Girls' "Period" and Latto's nickname-turned tag "Big Latto". Doja Cat starts the song with her verse after leading the intro and the song transitions into Chloe's first verse from the original song. The song goes into the pre-chorus with added ad-libs from Doja Cat and original chorus before both City Girls take turns rapping their verses. After the second chorus, Latto proceeds to rap her verse which leads into the final chorus and new additional verses from both Chloe and Halle.

=== Critical reception ===
The remix was mostly met with positive reception, however Yung Miami (of City Girls) received backlash from fans online for her verse, which Chris Murphy of Vulture described as "less than her best effort". Yung Miami responded with humour to the criticism, tweeting, "That's wrong y'all said I ruined the song", and telling fans, "Maybe it'll grow on y'all". Jason Lipshutz of Billboard listed the song as among the most essential releases of the week, describing the remix as one that "unites six rising stars", and that it "will be a quietly important moment". He praised "Doja Cat's raucous energy, City Girls' melodic flow and Latto's confident drawl", while reminding readers to not "overlook the classy vibe Chloe x Halle carried over from the original".

=== Charts ===
Chart performance for the remix version of "Do It"
Chart (2020)	Peak position
New Zealand Hot Singles (RMNZ)	38

== Release history ==
Release dates and formats for "Do It"
Region	Date	Format(s)	Version	Label(s)	Ref.
Various	May 14, 2020	Digital download; streaming	Original	Parkwood; Columbia	
United States	July 7, 2020	Rhythmic radio	Original	Parkwood; Columbia	
Various	September 4, 2020	Digital download; streaming	Remix	Parkwood; Columbia	
