= The Kids Are Alright (album) =

2018 studio album by Chloe x Halle

Studio album by Chloe x Halle
- Released: March 23, 2018
- Recorded: 2015–2018
- Genre: R&B; pop
- Length: 52:33
- Label: Parkwood; Columbia
- Producer: Chloe x Halle; Doc Allison; Black Party; Derek Dixie; Leon Feldman; Omega Fonseca; Malay Ho; Bram Inscore; Isa The Machine Summers; Daniel McKinnon; The Messengers; Pluss; Pomo; Sad Money; Sidney Swift

Chloe x Halle chronology
The Two of Us (2017)	The Kids Are Alright (2018)	Ungodly Hour (2020)

Singles from The Kids Are Alright
- 1. "Grown" Released: December 29, 2017; 2. "The Kids Are Alright" Released: January 3, 2018; 3. "Happy Without Me" Released: June 22, 2018

The Kids Are Alright is the debut studio album by American duo Chloe x Halle. It was released on March 23, 2018 by Parkwood Entertainment and Columbia. The album features guest appearances from rappers GoldLink, Kari Faux and Joey Bada$$. The Kids Are Alright earned them their first two career Grammy Award nominations for Best Urban Contemporary Album and Best New Artist at the 61st Grammy Awards.

The Kids Are Alright is primarily a R&B album, also featuring elements of trap. The album was supported by its title track, released as the lead single from the album on January 3, 2018. Along with fourteen new songs, the album also featured "Grown", a track recorded by the duo that serves as the theme song for the American comedy series Grown-ish, as well as two songs from their 2016 EP Sugar Symphony. The track "Warrior" was featured in A Wrinkle in Time, the album received acclaim by the critics.

To promote the album, the duo performed the album track "Happy Without Me" and "The Kids Are Alright" on Jimmy Kimmel Live!, and released a 10-minute short film named after the album.

== Background ==
The duo began working on the album "three years ago, since before our EP, and before our mixtape." In an interview with Time, the girls mentioned Beyoncé and Billie Holiday as inspirations for the record.

When asked about the title, Chloe said,

"The title means so much to us; we're speaking about ourselves as we're growing into young women, telling ourselves we're going to be OK. We'll make mistakes and we'll have obstacles, but we'll overcome them. But then also in a general sense, with this generation and how the world has gone mad and all these crazy things that are left for this generation to handle, it's just proclaiming that we will be alright no matter what, and they shouldn't worry about us. I love being part of this generation because we're not afraid to let our voices be heard, and we're not afraid to speak our mind."

== Critical reception ==
The album received mostly positive reviews from critics upon its release. Writing for Refinery29, Courtney Smith stated, "Chloe x Halle write lyrics that address love, both universal and romantic, but do the latter from a place of power... It's a reminder to not underestimate or infantilize them simply because they are young."

Sydney Gore for MTV wrote, "Overall, this record is loaded with catchy bops, hardcore bangers and beautiful ballads with uplifting messages that will surely turn into anthems for various experiences in your personal life." Briana Younger, writing for Pitchfork said about the album, "The Beyoncé-approved sister act are fearless on their debut album, reshaping pop and R&B in their own images until even the highest-profile co-signs seem beside the point... Listening to their debut, it's easy to believe that if God spoke, she would sound like Chloe x Halle." Pitchfork rated the album 7.6 out of 10.

Gabe Bergado wrote in a review of the album for Teen Vogue, "Within the first few minutes of listening to Chloe x Halle's debut album The Kids Are Alright, you'll be completely entranced by the sisters' dreamy vocals and electrifying beats." Alex Zidel wrote for HotNewHipHop, saying, "[The album wows] many with impressive chemistry and an undeniable charm." Also listing "Happy without Me" as an album highlight, he wrote, "In a pairing that not many expected would sound this beautiful, Joey Bada$$ and Chloe x Halle makes for a fantastic collaboration... Joey complements the pair's voices as he raps seamlessly throughout his bars."

== The Kids Are Alright film ==
Immediately following the release of the album, the duo released a short film on YouTube named after the album. The film highlights six songs from the album, and features a guest appearance by Ashton Sanders. The film was directed by Cara Stricker, and written and creative directed by Kwasi Fordjour.

== Awards and nominations ==
Award nominations for The Kids Are Alright
Year	Nominated work	Category	Result	Notes
2018	Soul Train Music Awards	Album of The Year	Nominated	
2019	Grammy Awards	Best Urban Contemporary Album	Nominated	

== Track listing ==
Credits adapted from ASCAP, Tidal, and SESAC.

No.	Title	Lyrics	Music	Producer(s)	Length
1.	"Hello Friend (Intro)"	Chloe Bailey; Halle Bailey	C. Bailey; H. Bailey	C. Bailey; H. Bailey	2:13
2.	"The Kids Are Alright"	C. Bailey; H. Bailey; Diana Gordon	C. Bailey; H. Bailey; Tayla Parx	C. Bailey	2:49
3.	"Grown"	C. Bailey; H. Bailey	C. Bailey; H. Bailey	C. Bailey	2:35
4.	"Hi Lo" (featuring GoldLink)	C. Bailey; H. Bailey; D'Anthony Carlos	C. Bailey; H. Bailey; Pluss	C. Bailey; Pluss	3:07
5.	"Everywhere"	C. Bailey; H. Bailey	C. Bailey; H. Bailey	C. Bailey; Pluss^{[b]}	3:21
6.	"FaLaLa (Interlude)"	C. Bailey; H. Bailey	C. Bailey; H. Bailey	C. Bailey; H. Bailey	1:14
7.	"Fake" (featuring Kari Faux)	C. Bailey; H. Bailey; Kari Faux	C. Bailey; Malik Flint; Doc Allison	C. Bailey; Black Party; Allison	3:20
8.	"Baptize (Interlude)"	C. Bailey; H. Bailey	David Pimentel; Daniel McKinnon; Leon Feldman	C. Bailey; H. Bailey	1:07
9.	"Down"	C. Bailey; H. Bailey	Bram Inscore; Michael Fonseca; Isabella Summers	C. Bailey; H. Bailey	3:19
10.	"Galaxy"	C. Bailey; H. Bailey	C. Bailey; H. Bailey	C. Bailey	3:09
11.	"Happy Without Me" (featuring Joey Badass)	C. Bailey; H. Bailey; Joey Badass	C. Bailey; Nasri Atweh; Adam Messinger; Mikhail Beltran	C. Bailey; H. Bailey; The Messengers; Sad Money^{[a]}	3:27
12.	"Babybird"	C. Bailey; H. Bailey	C. Bailey; H. Bailey	C. Bailey; H. Bailey; Derek Dixie^{[b]}	3:07
13.	"Warrior"	C. Bailey; H. Bailey	C. Bailey; H. Bailey	C. Bailey	3:40
14.	"Cool People"	C. Bailey; H. Bailey	C. Bailey; H. Bailey; James Ryan Ho	C. Bailey; H. Bailey; Malay	3:38
15.	"Baby on a Plane"	C. Bailey; H. Bailey	C. Bailey; H. Bailey	C. Bailey	3:20
16.	"If God Spoke"	C. Bailey; H. Bailey	C. Bailey; H. Bailey; Sidney Swift	H. Bailey; Swift	3:23
Total length:					46:48

Bonus tracks
No.	Title	Lyrics	Music	Producer(s)	Length
17.	"Drop"	C. Bailey; H. Bailey	C. Bailey; H. Bailey	C. Bailey; H. Bailey	3:09
18.	"Fall"	C. Bailey; H. Bailey	C. Bailey; H. Bailey	C. Bailey	2:38
Total length:					52:33

Notes

- ^{^[a]} signifies a co-producer.
- ^{^[b]} signifies an additional producer.
- "Hi Lo", "Baptize", "Down", "Happy without Me" and "Cool People" feature vocal production by Chloe Bailey and Halle Bailey.
- "Fake", "Galaxy" and "Babybird" feature guitars by Halle Bailey.
- "Happy Without Me" features keyboard and programming by Adam Messinger, Nasri Atweh, Mikhail "Sad Money" Beltran and Chloe Bailey.

== Charts ==
Chart (2018)	Peak position
US Billboard 200	139
US Top R&B/Hip-Hop Albums (Billboard)	19
US Heatseekers Albums (Billboard)	4
