= Freedom (Beyoncé song) =

Single by Beyoncé featuring Kendrick Lamar

from the album Lemonade
- Released: September 9, 2016
- Recorded: 2016
- Studio: The Beehive (Los Angeles)
- Genre: Gospel rock
- Length: 4:50
- Label: Parkwood; Columbia
- Songwriters: Jonny Coffer; Beyoncé; Carla Marie Williams; Dean McIntosh; Kendrick Lamar; Frank Tirado; Alan Lomax; John Lomax, Sr.
- Producers: Coffer; Beyoncé; Just Blaze

Beyoncé singles chronology
"Hold Up" (2016)	"Freedom" (2016)	"All Night" (2016)

Kendrick Lamar singles chronology
"The Greatest" (2016)	"Freedom" (2016)	"Really Doe" (2016)

Audio video
- "Freedom" on YouTube

"Freedom" is a song by the American singer Beyoncé featuring the American rapper Kendrick Lamar. It is the tenth track on her sixth studio album, Lemonade (2016), released through Parkwood Entertainment and Columbia Records. The song's music video is part of Beyoncé's 2016 film Lemonade, aired on HBO alongside the album's release. In the years since, the song has become an anthem for various social and political movements, most notably Kamala Harris' 2024 presidential campaign.

Beyoncé performed the song live as part of the set list of The Formation World Tour (2016), and at the 2016 BET Awards with Lamar. It received a nomination for Best Rap/Sung Performance at the 2017 Grammy Awards.

The song contains samples of "Let Me Try" (1969) by Kaleidoscope, as well as "Collection Speech/Unidentified Lining Hymn" (1959) and "Stewball" (1947), performed by Prisoner "22" at Mississippi State Penitentiary at Parchman.

== Background ==
On February 7, 2016, Beyoncé performed at the Super Bowl halftime show with Coldplay, Bruno Mars and Mark Ronson. She entered debuting a new single, "Formation", which would later be recontextualized as the lead single for Lemonade (2016). Immediately after the performance, a commercial announcing The Formation World Tour aired with the then-unknown instrumental of "Freedom". Musically, it is a gospel rock song.

== Video and release ==
"Freedom" was released within Lemonade on April 23, 2016. The album's film of the same name simultaneously aired on HBO. The film includes the music video for "Freedom", which has exclusively streamed on Tidal ever since. On the three-year anniversary of Lemonade, the album became available on all music streaming services. However, the film, and by extension "Freedom" music video, are still exclusively on Tidal.

== Composition ==
"Freedom" contains three musical samples: "Let Me Try", written by Frank Tirado, performed by Kaleidoscope; "Collection Speech/Unidentified Lining Hymn" (1959) and recorded by Alan Lomax, performed by Reverend R.C. Crenshaw; and "Stewball" (1947), recorded by Alan Lomax and John Lomax, Sr., performed by Prisoner "22" at Mississippi State Penitentiary at Parchman.

The spoken voice audio at the end of the song which starts with, "I had my ups and down..." is from Hattie White, Jay-Z's grandmother, at her 90th birthday party. A clip from the gathering of her speaking is included in the video "All Night" which is part of the Lemonade visual album.

Arrow Benjamin, who collaborated with Beyoncé on "Runnin' (Lose It All)" by musician Naughty Boy in 2015, served as the song's backing vocalist. Marcus Miller and Canei Finch played the bass and additional piano in "Freedom".

"Freedom" was mixed and recorded by Stuart White at Pacifique Recording Studios and The Beehive respectively. Its audio engineering was finished by Ramon Rivas with the assistance of John Cranfield. Boots and Myles William were responsible for the programming while Dave Kutch mastered the song at The Mastering Palace NYC in North Hollywood, California.

== Reception ==
=== Critical ===
"Freedom" was met with critical acclaim. Consequence of Sound named it the best song of 2016. It was voted as the 36th best single of 2016 in The Village Voice's annual Pazz & Jop poll.

Pitchfork named the song "Best New Track" on release, with editor Britt Jullious commenting "After [earlier songs on Lemonade] of paranoia, anger, and revenge, we finally get a song that speaks truth to Beyoncé’s deep well of feelings. Bathed in psychedelic, synthetic organs and a propulsive drum beat, the track cuts straight, providing an alternative narrative of personal redemption. It is also the explanatory work on [the album]." Everett True for The Independent wrote that the track "roars like thunder, and threatens to topple governments in its wake". Brittany Spanos and Sarah Grant of Rolling Stone called the song "one of the most striking political statements of [Beyoncé's] career".

=== Impact ===
The song became an anthem for the 2020 George Floyd protests and had a subsequent 625% rise in streamings, with the track being sung at protests including by actress and singer Amber Riley.

In 2024, Beyoncé gave Vice President Kamala Harris permission to use "Freedom" as the official song for her 2024 presidential campaign. The song then had a 1,300% rise in U.S. on-demand streams in the following two days. On July 25, 2024, Harris launched a digital ad in support of her candidacy featuring the song. In addition, Beyoncé would campaign for her in Houston, Texas, in October.

On August 20, 2024, Trump campaign spokesperson Steven Cheung posted a 13-second video onto X (formerly known as Twitter) of Trump's arrival for a rally in Michigan, using an excerpt from "Freedom". The following day, Beyoncé's record label and music publisher sent a cease-and-desist to Trump for using the song without permission.

== Commercial performance ==
On its release in Lemonade, "Freedom" debuted on the US Billboard Hot 100 at number 35 along with every other track from the album for the chart dating May 14, 2016. It also entered on the Hot R&B/Hip-Hop songs chart at number 21. In Canada, the song debuted and peaked at a position of 60 on the Canadian Hot 100. On the UK Singles Chart, "Freedom" debuted at the position of 40 for the chart issue dated May 5, 2016.

The following week, it descended five positions and exited. It set a peak position of 15 on the UK R&B Singles on May 12, 2016. In Australia, "Freedom" peaked at 62 and six on the Australian ARIA Singles Chart and Australian Urban Chart respectively. In France, "Freedom" debuted at its peak position of 53 on April 30, 2016, spending a total of three weeks on the singles chart. It ranked higher in Spain, where it climbed at number 37 on the country's chart. On the Belgian Ultratop Singles Chart in the Flanders region, "Freedom" attained a peak position of 27 in its second week of charting on May 14, 2016, where it spent a total of eight weeks.

== Live performances ==
=== 2016 ===
==== Formation World Tour ====
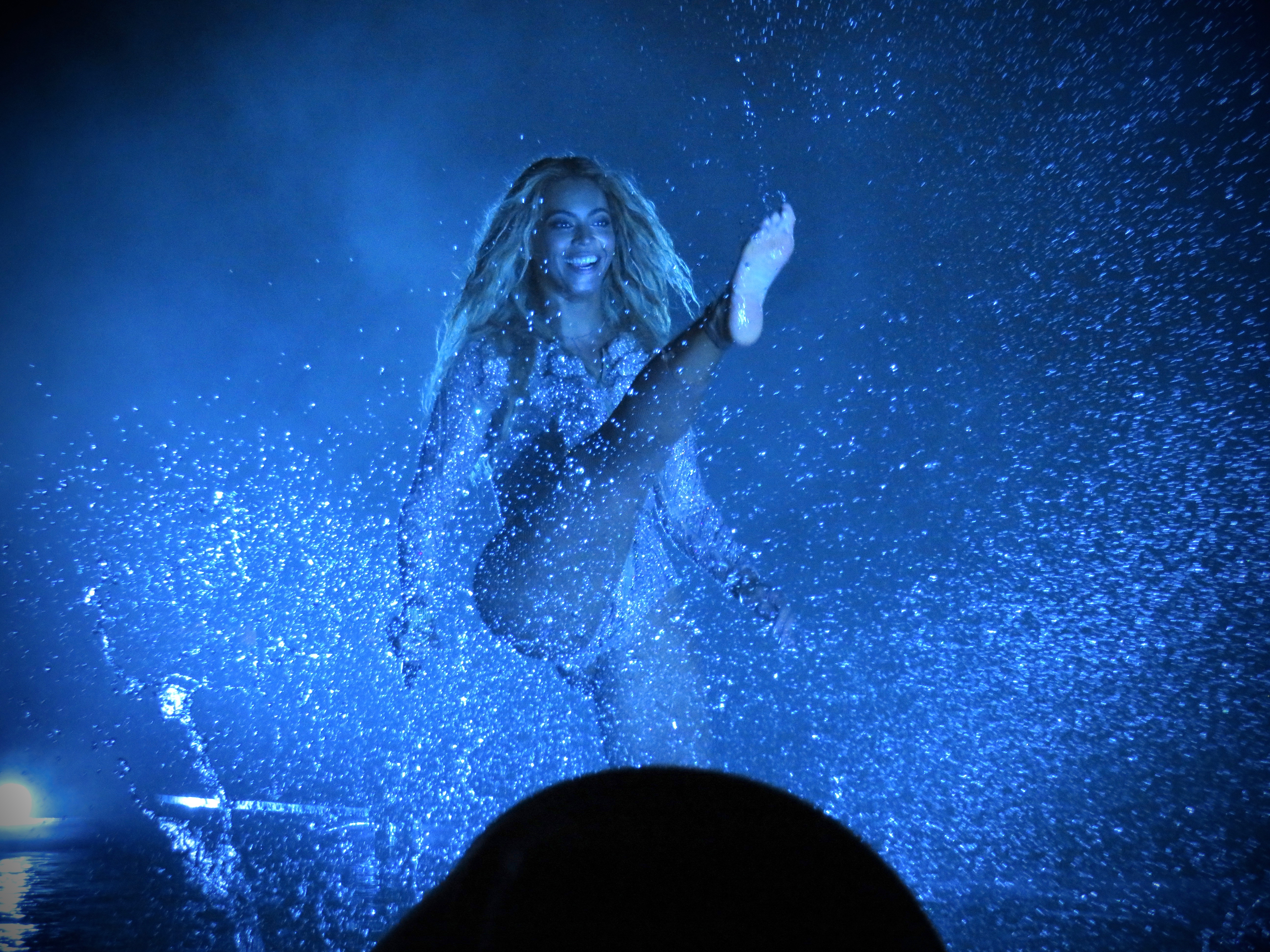
Beyoncé performed "Freedom" in a shallow pool of water on the B-stage of The Formation World Tour.

"Freedom" was part of the set list of The Formation World Tour, with the first performance taking place in Miami at the Marlins Park on April 27, 2016. The song was performed during the concert's closing act, in a large pool of water on the tour's secondary B-stage. Beyoncé and her dancers performed a choreographed dance, splashing in the water.

On the July 7, 2016 show in Glasgow, Scotland, Beyoncé held a moment of silence for Black people in America who had been killed by police brutality. Behind her, the 'monolith' screen displayed names of the hundreds of people who had been killed by police, including Alton Sterling and Philando Castile, who were killed in the previous two days. She then sang an a cappella version of "Freedom".

Pitchfork's Liz Tracy noted that though the choreography's tone was "serious and powerful given the song's strong Civil Rights message", the way the dancers "splashed as they marched and stomped was also playful—and just incredible to watch, visually".

==== BET Awards ====
Beyoncé performed "Freedom" with Kendrick Lamar as the opening number at the 2016 BET Awards on June 26. It opened with a voice-over of Martin Luther King Jr.'s 1963 "I Have a Dream" speech as female dancers marched towards the main stage. For the performance, Beyoncé was backed by dancers wearing tribal patterns, and performed a stomping choreography in a pool of water, similar to the one performed during The Formation Tour. The stage was illuminated by red and yellow lights, and filled with pyrotechnics and smoke. Toward the end, Lamar joined Beyoncé in the pool, where he performed his part and they both stomped in the water. Billboard praised their performance for its dynamic and intense choreography and political themes.

Time writer Nash Jankins noted the "intense, thoroughly choreographed" performance of the song, with the King snippet, furthered Beyoncé becoming more politically involved in her music. Similarly, August Brown of Los Angeles Times deemed the rendition "powerful, politically and aesthetically charged," and felt that it was evocative of concepts found on Lemonade with its "Hurricane Katrina floods, imagery of the African diaspora, and the relationships between personal and national traumas". Brown went on saying that the politically charged performance came in during a right time, when the matters of black pride, xenophobia and racial justice were highly discussed and finished his review by concluding that watching Beyoncé and Lamar perform was "a consummation of everything good and right in pop music today".

The Daily Beast's Marlow Stern called "Freedom" the show's "shock opener" with its themes of slavery and the Black Lives Matter movement, and noted how seeing the duo perform together was "truly a sight to behold". Matthew Dessem, writing for Slate magazine, noted how the "spectacular" performance was suitable for being an Olympic opening ceremony. He praised both singers for being in their top forms, with Beyoncé particularly being "note-perfect" and summarized the performance as "the rare case of a performer as hyped as Beyoncé actually exceeding sky-high expectations".

=== 2018 ===
Beyoncé later performed "Freedom" during her 2018 Coachella performance, which according to Mikael Wood from the Los Angeles Times "rode a heavy groove played on sousaphones"; the song then transitioned into "Lift Every Voice and Sing", commonly known as the Black National Anthem, whose lyrics "depict the trials and triumphs of Black people in the United States from the Middle Passage to now". The number was subsequently included in the 2019 Homecoming film and live album.

The same year, "Freedom" was performed during the On the Run II Tour, Beyoncé's second co-headlining, all stadium tour with her husband Jay-Z. For Pasadena Star-News's Kelli Skye Fadroski, the singer "brought down the house" with the number.

The song was on the set list for her and Jay-Z's performance at the 2018 Global Citizen Festival: Mandela 100 charity concert in Johannesburg, South Africa, which commemorated Nelson Mandela's 100th birthday.

=== 2023 ===
Beyoncé performed "Freedom" on January 21, 2023, as part of her performance in Dubai.

=== 2024 ===
On December 25, 2024, Beyoncé sampled "Freedom" to transition "Blackbiird" into "Ya Ya" as part of her 2024 NFL Halftime Show set list.

=== 2025 ===
"Freedom" was a part of the Cowboy Carter Tour setlist, with the first show taking place in Los Angeles at SoFi Stadium on April 28, 2025.

== Credits and personnel ==
Credits adapted from Lemonade liner notes.

- Writing – Beyoncé Knowles, Jonny Coffer, Carla Marie Williams, Dean McIntosh, Lamar, Frank Tirado, Alan Lomax, John Lomax, Sr.
- Production – Coffer, Beyoncé, Just Blaze
- Vocal production – Beyoncé
- Audio mixing – Stuart White; Pacifique Recording Studios, North Hollywood, California
- Recording – Stuart White, Arthur Chambazyan (assistant); The Beehive, Los Angeles, California
- Second engineering – Ramon Rivas
- Assistant mix engineering – John Cranfield
- Backing vocals – Arrow Benjamin
- Additional programming – Boots, Myles William
- Bass – Marcus Miller
- Additional piano – Canei Finch
- Mastering – Dave Kutch; The Mastering Palace NYC, Pacifique Recording Studios, North Hollywood, California

== Charts ==
=== Weekly charts ===
Weekly chart performance
Chart (2016)	Peak position
Australia (ARIA)	62
Australia Urban Singles (ARIA)	6
Belgium (Ultratop 50 Flanders)	27
Canada Hot 100 (Billboard)	60
Euro Digital Songs (Billboard)	15
Finland Download (Latauslista)	12
France (SNEP)	53
Ireland (IRMA)	95
Norway Digital Songs (Billboard)	10
Scottish Singles Sales (Official Charts)	26
Spain (Promusicae)	37
Sweden Heatseeker Songs (Sverigetopplistan)	5
Sweden Digital Songs (Billboard)	5
UK Singles (Official Charts)	40
UK Hip Hop/R&B (Official Charts)	15
US Billboard Hot 100	35
US Hot R&B/Hip-Hop Songs (Billboard)	21

=== Year-end charts ===
Annual chart rankings
Chart (2016)	Position
Belgium (Ultratop Flanders Urban)	23

== Certifications ==
Region	Certification	Certified units/sales
Australia (ARIA)	Gold	35,000^{‡}
Brazil (Pro-Música Brasil)	Gold	30,000^{‡}
United Kingdom (BPI)	Silver	200,000^{‡}
United States (RIAA)	Platinum	1,000,000^{‡}
^{‡} Sales+streaming figures based on certification alone.

== Release history ==
"Freedom" release history
Region	Date	Format	Label	Ref.
Italy	September 9, 2016	Radio airplay	Sony	
