= Love Drought =

2016 song by Beyoncé

Song by Beyoncé

from the album Lemonade
- Released: April 24, 2016
- Studio: Jungle Studios (New York City)
- Genre: Electronica; R&B
- Length: 3:58
- Label: Parkwood; Columbia
- Songwriters: Ingrid Burley; Mike Dean; Beyoncé
- Producers: Mike Dean; Beyoncé

Music video
- "Love Drought" on YouTube

"Love Drought" is a song by American singer Beyoncé from her sixth studio album, Lemonade (2016). The song's music video, directed by Kahlil Joseph, is part of Beyoncé's 2016 film Lemonade, aired on HBO alongside the album's release.

It was written by Ingrid Burley, Mike Dean and Beyoncé while the production was handled by the latter two. Burley was inspired to write "Love Drought" following an unpleasant experience with representatives at Parkwood Entertainment. Following the release of Lemonade, the track appeared on several music charts, including 47 on the US Billboard Hot 100 and top 100 in the UK, Scotland, and Canada. Beyoncé performed the song in a medley with "Sandcastles" at the 59th Annual Grammy Awards in February 2017.

== Background ==
"Love Drought" is an electronica and R&B track written by Ingrid Burley, Mike Dean and Beyoncé while the production was handled by the latter two. During an interview in June 2016, Burley revealed that the song was not inspired by Jay Z's infidelity, although such speculations circulated in the media. She revealed that Beyoncé herself, was also unaware that the lyrics of "Love Drought" were aimed at Parkwood Entertainment. Describing it as a "metaphor about music", she recalled that the song was conceived after two representatives of the label lied to her that Beyoncé was not considering working on new music. Following a Los Angeles writing camp, she witnessed that the singer wrote notes for new material and explained that she wrote the lyrics "Ten times out of nine I know you're lying / But nine times out of ten, I know you're trying", "just thinking as I'm looping this beat I couldn't get out of my head the fact that they just lied to me".

== Commercial performance ==
After the release of Lemonade, "Love Drought" appeared on several music charts. It debuted on the US Billboard Hot 100 chart at number 47 for the chart issue dated May 14, 2016. The same week, the song also entered the Hot R&B/Hip-Hop songs and the Canadian Hot 100 charts at numbers 28 and 84, respectively. "Love Drought" debuted at a position of 69 on the UK Singles Chart for the chart dated April 29, 2016. The following week it descended to the position of 84 before falling off the chart. On the UK R&B Chart it peaked at 26 in its first week of charting. For the week of April 22, 2016, the track debuted at number 152 on the singles chart in France. In Australia, it peaked at number 19 on the ARIA Urban Chart following the release of Lemonade.

== Personnel ==
Credits adapted from Beyoncé's website

Song credits

- Writing – Mike Dean, Ingrid Burley, Beyoncé
- Production – Mike Dean, Beyoncé
- Vocal production – Beyoncé
- Keyboards and drum programming – Mike Dean
- Recording – Stuart White; Jungle City Studios, New York City
- Audio mixing – Stuart White; Pacifique Studio, Los Angeles
- Track engineering – Mike Dean
- Second engineering – Ramon Rivas
- Assistant mix engineering – John Cranfield
- Mastering – Dave Kutch, The Mastering Palace, New York City

== Charts ==
Chart (2016)	Peak position
Australia Urban Singles (ARIA)	19
Canada Hot 100 (Billboard)	84
France (SNEP)	152
Scottish Singles Sales (Official Charts)	91
Sweden Heatseeker (Sverigetopplistan)	14
UK Singles (Official Charts)	69
UK Hip Hop/R&B (Official Charts)	26
US Billboard Hot 100	47
US Hot R&B/Hip-Hop Songs (Billboard)	28

== Certifications ==
Certification for "Love Drought"
Region	Certification	Certified units/sales
United States (RIAA)	Platinum	1,000,000^{‡}
^{‡} Sales+streaming figures based on certification alone.
