= All Night (Beyoncé song) =

2016 single by Beyoncé

- Adapted from the Lemonade booklet

Single by Beyoncé

from the album Lemonade
- Released: December 2, 2016
- Studio: Jungle City (New York City); Conway Recording (Los Angeles); Mad Decent (Burbank, California)
- Genre: Reggae; R&B
- Length: 5:22
- Label: Parkwood; Columbia
- Songwriters: Thomas Wesley Pentz; Beyoncé; Henry Allen; André Benjamin; Antwan Patton; Patrick Brown; Timothy Thomas; Theron Thomas; Ilsey Juber; Akil King; Jaramye Daniels
- Producers: Diplo; Beyoncé

Beyoncé singles chronology
"Freedom" (2016)	"All Night" (2016)	"Shining" (2017)

Music video
- "All Night" on YouTube

"All Night" is a song by American singer Beyoncé. It is the eleventh track on her sixth studio album, Lemonade (2016), released through Parkwood Entertainment and Columbia Records. The song's music video is part of Beyoncé's 2016 film Lemonade, aired on HBO alongside the album's release.

The song was written by Diplo, Beyoncé, Henry Allen, Timothy Thomas, Theron Thomas, Ilsey Juber, Akil King, and Jaramye Daniels. Diplo, Beyoncé, and Allen co-produced the track.

A reggae-tinged track, "All Night" features "sprinklings" of horns and strings in its instrumentation, while sampling the brass line from "SpottieOttieDopaliscious" written by OutKast (André Benjamin, Antwan Patton) and Sleepy Brown (Patrick Brown). The song was sent to Italian radio as the album's fifth single on December 2, 2016. Lyrically, the song focuses on forgiveness and rebuilding trust after infidelity, with the protagonist trying to rekindle the passion with her lover. The song's music video is part of a one-hour film with the same title as its parent album, originally aired on HBO which premiered in April 2016.

== Critical response ==
The song received critical acclaim from critics upon release. Entertainment Weekly listed "All Night" at number 15 on their list of best songs of the year, with the editor Leah Greenblat commenting "It makes sense that a sweet, tender lullaby of a love song would garner less attention in the immediate wake of Mrs. Carter's firebomb Lemonade revelations, but it would be a shame to miss this low-key stunner, one of the all-time finest odes to a subject pop music hardly ever deigns sexy enough to address: long-term monogamy." Consequence of Sound included the song at number 38 on their year-end ranking and USA Today, at number 3. The song would later be voted in Village Voice's Pazz & Jop the 46th best single of 2016.

== Commercial performance ==
After the release of Lemonade, "All Night" debuted on the Billboard Hot 100 chart at number 38. The song also debuted on the Hot R&B/Hip-Hop songs chart at number 23. In overseas charts, although not being an official single, the song entered the top 10 in Sweden's digital charts. As of June, the song has sold 146,832 downloads in US.

== Music video ==
The music video for the song was released to YouTube on November 30, 2016. The video features footage from Beyoncé's home movies, including her and Jay-Z's wedding day and spending family time with their first daughter, Blue Ivy. The video features Zendaya, Amandla Stenberg, Chloe x Halle, twin sister music duo Ibeyi and Quvenzhané Wallis.

== Live performances ==
"All Night" was part of the set list of The Formation World Tour with the first performance taking place in Miami at the Marlins Park on April 27, 2016.

== Charts ==
=== Weekly charts ===
Weekly chart performance for "All Night"
Chart (2016–2017)	Peak position
Australia Urban Singles (ARIA)	15
Belgium (Ultratip Bubbling Under Flanders)	4
Belgium Urban (Ultratop Flanders)	14
Canada Hot 100 (Billboard)	73
CIS Airplay (TopHit)	187
France (SNEP)	71
Hungary (Rádiós Top 40)	30
Scottish Singles Sales (Official Charts)	57
Sweden Heatseeker (Sverigetopplistan)	8
UK Singles (Official Charts)	60
UK Hip Hop/R&B (Official Charts)	23
US Billboard Hot 100	38
US Hot R&B/Hip-Hop Songs (Billboard)	23
US R&B/Hip-Hop Airplay (Billboard)	23

=== Year-end charts ===
Year-end chart performance for "All Night"
Chart (2017)	Peak position
Belgian Urban (Ultratop Flanders)	72

== Certifications ==
Certifications for "All Night"
Region	Certification	Certified units/sales
Australia (ARIA)	Gold	35,000^{‡}
Brazil (Pro-Música Brasil)	Platinum	60,000^{‡}
Canada (Music Canada)	Gold	40,000^{‡}
France (SNEP)	Gold	100,000^{‡}
New Zealand (RMNZ)	Platinum	30,000^{‡}
United Kingdom (BPI)	Gold	400,000^{‡}
United States (RIAA)	2× Platinum	2,000,000^{‡}
^{‡} Sales+streaming figures based on certification alone.

== Release history ==
"All Night" release history
Region	Date	Format	Label	Ref.
Italy	December 2, 2016	Radio airplay	Sony	
United States	December 6, 2016	Rhythmic contemporary radio	Columbia	
