= Rocket (Beyoncé song) =

Song by Beyoncé

from the album Beyoncé
- Released: December 13, 2013
- Recorded: 2012
- Studio: Jungle City Studios, Oven Studios (New York City)
- Genre: Neo soul; funk; R&B
- Length: 6:31
- Label: Parkwood; Columbia
- Songwriters: Beyoncé Knowles; Miguel Jontel Pimentel; Timothy Mosley; Justin Timberlake
- Producers: Beyoncé Knowles; Timbaland

Music video
- "Rocket" on YouTube

"Rocket" is a song by American singer Beyoncé from her fifth studio album, Beyoncé (2013). It was written by Miguel, Justin Timberlake, Timbaland, Jerome "J-Roc" Harmon, and Beyoncé, with the group of the latter three people also serving as its producers. Miguel initially conceived the song, inspired by Beyoncé, trying to showcase her confidence and sexuality. Beyoncé revealed that "Rocket" was inspired by D'Angelo's "Untitled (How Does It Feel)" (2000) and felt it was one of her liberating songs meant to illustrate different sides of her personality.

"Rocket" is a slowtempo soul, funk and R&B ballad which was frequently compared to the music of D'Angelo and Prince. It features explicit and metaphorical lyrics discussing frank female sexuality, a prominent theme present on Beyoncé. Lyrically, it sees Beyoncé addressing a male partner through sexual innuendos, adopting soft and sensual vocals.

A music video for the song was directed by Beyoncé, Ed Burke, and Bill Kirstein and released through Beyoncé itself on December 13, 2013. It was shot at The Standard, High Line hotel, New York City, in black-and-white using a slow motion technique and features various shots of the singer, who appears dressed in lingerie for most of the time. Many critics considered it to be one of the most erotic clips on the entire album and praised its filming technique. At the 2014 MTV Video Music Awards, Beyoncé performed "Rocket" during a medley consisting of songs from her fifth studio album. It was also a part of the setlist during The Formation World Tour (2016).

== Background ==
"Rocket" was written by Miguel, Justin Timberlake, Timbaland, Jerome "J-Roc" Harmon and Beyoncé for the latter's self-titled fifth studio album. It was produced by Beyoncé, Timbaland, and Harmon, with the former also serving as the song's vocal producer. The track was recorded with guidance by Stuart White and Chris Godbey in Jungle City Studios and Oven Studios, both located in New York City. The engineering of "Rocket" was done by Ramon Rivas with assistance from Matt Weber. Chris Godbey finished the mixing, and eventually, the mastering was done by Tom Coyne and Aya Merrill at Sterling Sound. Timberlake further provided background vocals.

While working in the studio for her fifth studio album, Beyoncé demanded that Miguel write a song in which nothing was "off-limits" and where he could push the envelope creatively. He recalled that they collaborated soon after she had had her first baby. Inside the studio, she told him, "'Listen I feel so empowered at this time and place. You'll have to put me on a pedestal, like, never mind that it's Beyoncé. I wanna make music that makes me feel or shows that I feel hot and I'm confident and I wanna feel empowered because that's what I meant in my life'". For the opening lines of the song, Miguel was inspired by the singer herself: "What's the first thing I'd want Beyoncé to say to me, as a man? What have I not heard her say? That's where the song came from." He further noted that "Rocket" managed to showcase a new part of the singer, which was confident, sexual, and liberating at the same time.

Beyoncé explained on her iTunes Radio channel that "Rocket" was one of the "most sensual songs", adding that it reminded her of the vibes of D'Angelo's song "Untitled (How Does It Feel)" (2000). The singer elaborated the concept behind the song during an album documentary filmed for Beyoncé, titled "Honesty", saying, "Now I'm in my 30s, and those children that grew up listening to me have grown up, and I always felt like it was my responsibility to be aware of kids and their parents and all these generation". With that said, the singer felt "stifled" and unable to express every feeling she wanted to show. However, she noted that with "Rocket", one of the most liberating songs on the record, she managed to express many of those feelings and show different sides of her personality. Revealing that she would not have been confident enough to record the song earlier in her career, Beyoncé noted, "I kinda dropped that fourth wall and I did it". The singer also discussed the meaning of the song by saying, "What I love about this song is, it takes you through this journey. You're flirting and you're talking all of your arrogant s--t [sic]. Then you climax, and then you have your cigarette... This song actually is about singing from the heart, and harmonies and adlibs and arrangement". During the same video, she praised Timberlake and Miguel's work; the clip also showed footage of Beyoncé recording the song in the studio.

== Composition ==
"Rocket"
A 30 second of "Rocket", a slow-tempo ballad drawing elements from soul, neo soul, funk, and R&B.

"Rocket" is a six and a half-minute track, the longest one on Beyoncé. It has a time signature of 6/8. It is a slow tempo ballad and explores elements of soul music, neo soul, funk and R&B. It was noted to be one of the album's retro songs. Houston Chronicle's Joey Guerra deemed the track an "old-school R&B stunner" filled with "all swooping verses and steamy choruses". Many critics found similarities to work by musician Prince. Nick Catucci of Entertainment Weekly described the track as a "funk excursion" similar to songs by Prince. Mike Divers from Clash magazine also felt that "Rocket" was reminiscent of Prince's "funky prime". Jon Pareles of The New York Times noted that the seductive track harks back to Prince's music with "harmonies blossom[ing] all around Beyoncé's cooing lead vocal". Julia Leconte of Now summarized the song's sound as a cross between music by D'Angelo during the late-90s and Usher during the early 2000s. Other critics noted "Rocket" to be a rehash and a homage of D'Angelo's work, particularly on his song "Untitled (How Does It Feel)". Claire Lobenfeld of Complex magazine found cues taken from "Untitled" in "Rocket" to the "point of pop-facsimile". Variety's Andrew Barker deemed the seductive, "grinding" "Rocket" a 2013 makeover of that song. In a review for The Quietus, Mof Gimmers concluded that the song followed up where Ciara's "Body Party" (2013) and R. Kelly's Black Panties (2013) finished.

Keeping in line with the most prominent theme of Beyoncé, "Rocket" explores frank female sexuality. It opens with Beyoncé expressing feelings of lust in the first line, "Let me sit this assssss [sic] on ya" for which she adopts a soft and sultry vocal style. She further sings about love-making with a male lover and the second line includes the lyrics: "Let me take this off while you watch me / that's my'ass appeal". It features explicit and metaphorical lyrics throughout and sees Beyoncé instructing her love interest to watch her perform a striptease. She further talks about how their evening together is going to proceed with lyrics such as "If you like you can touch it babe, do you wanna touch it baby?"

While singing the lines "So rock right up to the side of my mountain / Climb until you reach my peak babe my peak, the peak / And reach right into the bottom of my fountain", Beyoncé uses sexual innuendos. She also incorporates similar double entendres and euphemisms in the lyrics, "Reach right into the bottom of my fountain / dip me under to where you can feel my river flow / Rock it till water falls". During the end of the song, Beyoncé sings the lines "You rock hard / I rock steady" eventually "erupting into an orgasmic finish" as stated by Puja Patel of Spin. During the last part, she sings "Goddamnit, I'm comfortable in my skin / And you're comfortable in my skin". It was noted that during the end of the song, the protagonist becomes ready to be sexually subordinate and "discipline[d]" as opposed to the first part where she adopted a more dominant persona; this is further exemplified in the lines "Punish me, punish me please" where Beyoncé uses soft vocals.

== Critical reception ==
"Rocket" was met with critical acclaim. John Kennedy from Vibe magazine opined it was impossible for a sexually active person not to feel an urge to invite their partner over upon hearing "Rocket". Evan Rytlewski of The A.V. Club compared the song's sexiness to that of "Drunk in Love" in a style of an "overeager, pre-shower quickie", calling both of them the singer's raunchiest and most romantic. Mike Diver of Clash felt surprised by Miguel's writing contribution mostly due to the sound showcased in the song. Now's Julia LeConte listed the song as the best on the entire album. Andy Kellman from AllMusic called "Rocket" the second best song on Beyoncé, deeming it an "amusing mix of metaphorical and explicit come-ons" with an "elegant" opening line. Similarly, Rob Sheffield of Rolling Stone provided a positive review for the "squishy" tune where Beyoncé "hits nasty highs", further praising the first line as a nice song-opener. Jon Dolan of the same publication further praised it as the best opening line of the "sumptuously asstastic" track. In an article for Vulture, Jody Rosen viewed the song as "teasingly slow and salacious" and felt that its opening line was one of the best of all time. James Montgomery from MTV News regarded it as a "slowed-down jam in the purest sense of the term".

Writers of Billboard magazine called "Rocket" a "baby-making anthem" in the vein of Zapp, which finds the singer "fully equipped for the occasion". Commenting it was "a primer on what sex with Beyoncé is like", Chris Bosman from the website Consequence of Sound concluded the track "beats R. Kelly at his own game of pairing hyper-specific, 'so ridiculous they're incredible' bedroom euphemisms with the most classic of soul vibes". Writer Greg Kot of the Chicago Tribune noted that Beyoncé's voice turned into a "lust-saturated choir" on the track. Mikael Wood of the Los Angeles Times felt the "sumptuous" song provided a room for the singer to "flex her impressive stylistic chops". Jody Rosen in Vulture also described it as a "sumptuous old-fashioned soul ballad, [which] goes down like a profiterole". Ryan E.C. Hamm from Under the Radar advised people who thought D'Angelo's "Untitled " is "the sexiest song ever" to hear "Rocket". Lindsey Weber of Vulture considered it an ode to "Untitled" and summed it up as "insanely sexy". Editor Caitlin White writing for the website The 405 noted how the singer managed to reveal her true side in "Rocket" while making herself the dominant lover.

Philip Matusavage in a review for the musicOMH pointed out the lines "you're the shit, that makes you my equivalent" as re-appropriation of "When I Get You Alone" (2002) by singer Robin Thicke. BET's Latifah Muhammad used the words "assertive, feminine, coy and direct" to describe the track. Una Mullally of The Irish Times dubbed "Rocket" as "simple and inoffensive". Kevin Fallon of The Daily Beast felt that Beyoncé managed to execute a modern Motown sound. Tris McCall of The Star-Ledger wrote that "Rocket" featured "a thing or two to say about the irresistible siren call of her butt". Claire Lobenfeld from Complex found "Rocket" to be more sultry than the rest of the songs on the album. Tim Finney of the same publication highlighted "Rocket" as a "relatively classicist... sex romp slow jam" and concluded, "[it] gradually disintegrates into a loosely interwoven patchwork of faux-improvised exclamations and exhalations as Beyoncé determinedly roots out every possible voluptuous vocal angle on the song's preoccupations".

Stereogum journalist Tom Breihan described "Rocket" as "a squelchy, Prince-ly old-school sex-ballad" in which the singer seemingly "melt[s] into the track". He stated that despite "nothing remotely innovative about it... I can't remember the last time I heard a ballad of this type so completely fleshed-out and fully realized". Ryan B. Patrick of Exclaim! noted that songs on the album, such as Rocket", effectively display genre diversity, Beyoncé's vocal range and "a penchant of musical experimentation". Although describing it as a "pitch-perfect rehash" of "Untitled" and noting that it succeeded in turning Beyoncé's "sex life into topography", Fact's Chris Kelly felt "Rocket" was unnecessary on the album. Philip Cosores of Paste stated that the song was "dragging on a minute or two too long". Janice Llamoca from the website HipHopDX called it suitable for a bonus track on Timberlake's The 20/20 Experience (2013). Neil McCormick, writing for The Daily Telegraph criticized the song as a "superflous" [sic] cut meant for The 20/20 Experience. In the annual Pazz and Jop mass critics poll of the year's best in music in 2013, "Rocket" was ranked at number 424.

== Music video ==
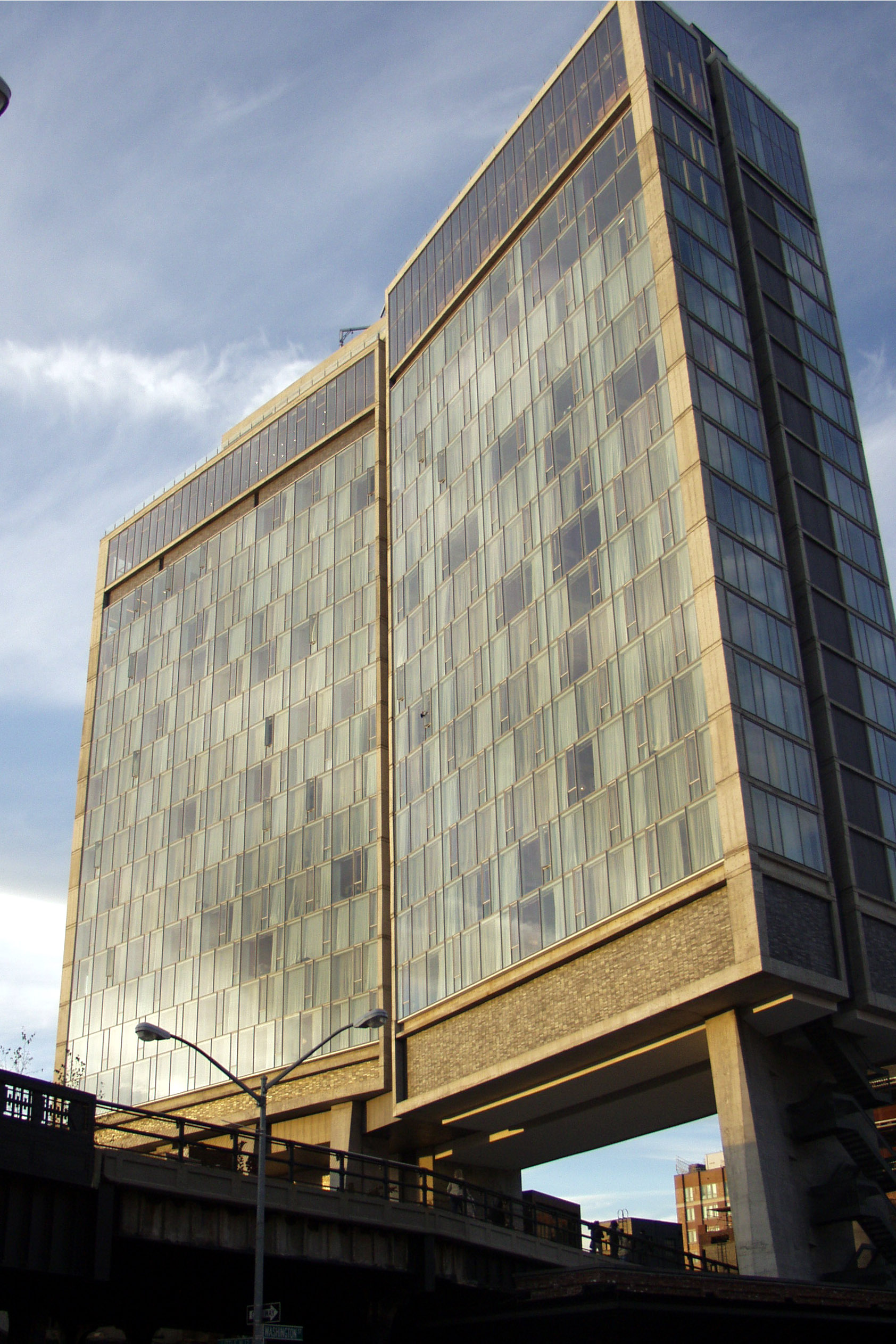
The Standard, High Line hotel, where the video for "Rocket" was filmed

The music video for "Rocket" was directed by Beyoncé along with Ed Burke and Bill Kirstein. It was filmed at a room known as Hudson Studio in the hotel The Standard, High Line, located in Manhattan, New York City. Some of the scenes were also shot in the hotel's hallway while others were filmed at different locations. The visual was released on December 13, 2013, to iTunes Store on Beyoncé itself along with sixteen other music videos for every track on the album. On November 24, 2014, it was also uploaded to the singer's Vevo account. Todd Tourso, who served as the creative director for Beyoncé, revealed that while making the video, "Rocket" was altered to fit with its visual counterpart.

During one scene in the video, Beyoncé is seen wearing a denim button-down top and a lace bra by retailer Agent Provocateur. In a commentary about the look, Joanna Nikas of The New York Times described her style as "[a]t-[h]ome". Neal Farinah, who worked as a stylist for the singer, elaborated that the team wanted to keep her hair long and wavy to portray sexuality and femininity. The video features various close-up shots of the singer throughout; she is seen writhing on a bed dressed in lingerie, eating strawberries, having a shower inside a bathtub, playing on a piano. Other scenes show various objects and Beyoncé walking along a corridor and lighting up a cigarette atop a car.

=== Reception ===
A writer from the website E! Online felt that in the video, Beyoncé "most certainly comes into her own". Puja Patel of Spin regarded it as "practically a tribute to her curves". An editor for CTV News noted how the singer was seen hovering over a bed in an exorcist style. Kathy Iandoli from Vice remarked on the same particular scenes for showing Beyoncé living in a matrix. Billie Cohen from the magazine Condé Nast Traveler noted that "maybe one of the most memorable image" from the visual album was when the singer was seen falling on a king-size bed in "Rocket". In what she perceived to be the best dance moves on the album, Lindsey Weber of Vulture listed the same scene. Considering it one of the most intimate videos on the entire record, Michael Zelenko from The Fader noted, "In a collection full of erotic videos, 'Rocket,' with its heaving chests, bare thighs, bubble baths, and nails clawing at sheets, manages to stand apart as the steamiest of the bunch." Jody Rosen of The New York Times opined that the video featured mostly slow-motion pictures of "billowing silk sheets and water droplets tumbling onto Beyoncé's bare midriff". Neil McCormik from The Daily Telegraph noted the lack of subtlety during the scenes showing a power drill and Beyoncé "shuddering with pleasure". In another review, he labeled the clip as "very naughty".

Fuse writer Jason Newman called the clip an ode to D'Angelo and went on to state it worked as part underwear commercial, part shower commercial. Writing for the Italian edition of Vogue, Valentina Veneziano concluded that the video showcased Beyoncé's positive attitude portrayed through her laugh in "Rocket". Meghan O'Keefe from VH1 argued that the video was the first to focus on Beyoncé's "voluptuous curve, toned muscle, raised goosebumps and bleached strands of bed head". Brent DiCrescenzo from the magazine Time Out found influences by Madonna from her work on the album Erotica (1992) and the book Sex (1992). Vanity Fair reviewer Michelle Collins opined that the video opened with shots of Beyoncé on a bed to slightly change the overall feeling present on the album. Insanul Ahmed writing in Complex remarked that things "get sensual" in "Rocket"'s clip. Whitney Phaneuf of the website HitFix was more critical towards the visual, saying that it "may be the sexiest video of the bunch, but it's achieved in such a conventional way that it ends up being boring". On December 21, 2013, eight days following the release of the video for "Rocket", CTV News reported that the hotel where the clip was filmed would earn profit from the exposure in the album.

== Live performances ==
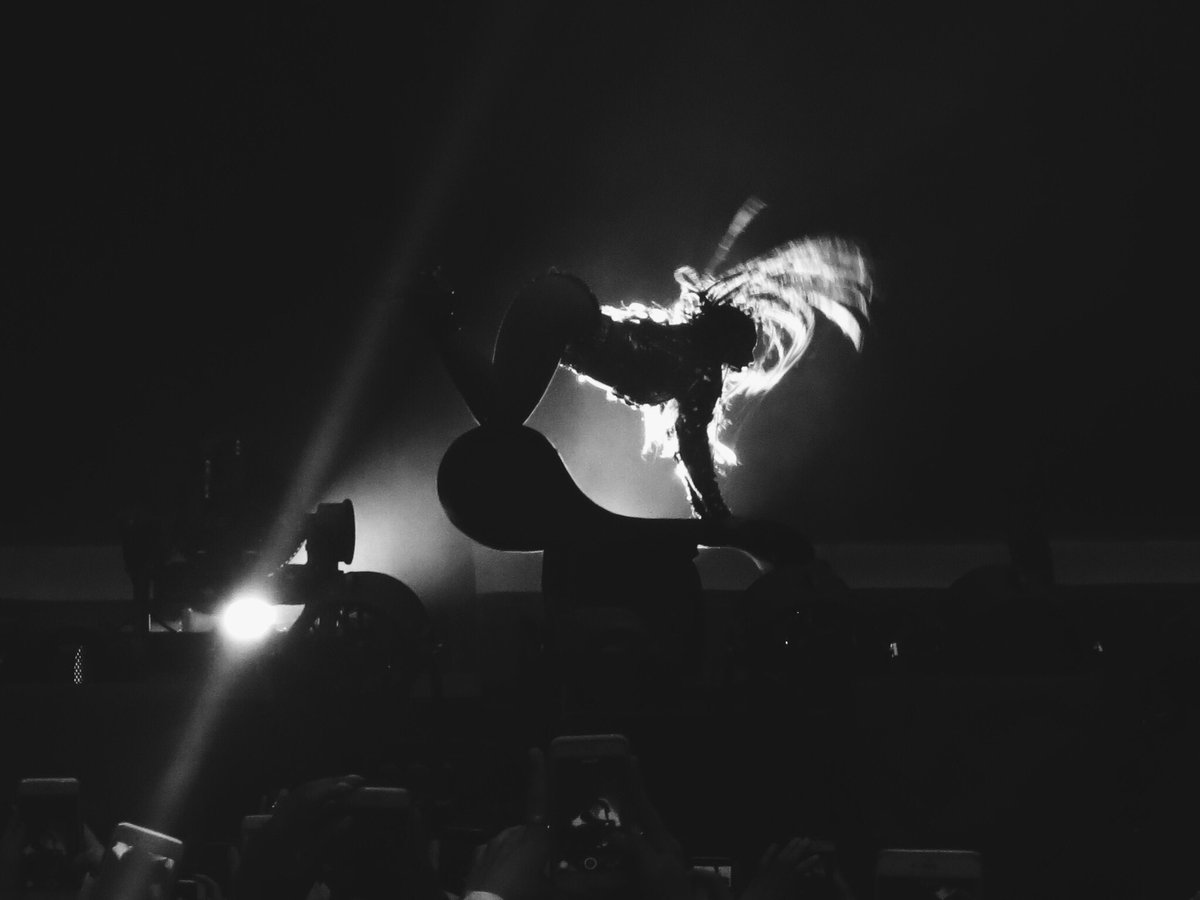
Beyoncé performing a chair dance choreography at The Formation World Tour during "Rocket"

"Rocket" was performed live for the first time by Beyoncé during the 2014 MTV Video Music Awards on August 25, as part of a medley consisting of songs from her self-titled album. For the rendition of the song, the singer danced atop a chair, surrounded by smoke on stage. She performed the same dance choreography seen in the music video for "Partition". Beyoncé was dressed in a jeweled bodysuit and performed "Rocket" as the seventh song on the set. Mike Wayers writing for The Wall Street Journal noted that the performance of the song was during the medley's "sexiest part". Following the song's live performance, its sales in the US increased by 584%. In 2016, "Rocket" was performed live throughout The Formation World Tour. During the track, a line of "Untitled (How Does It Feel)" was implemented, and Beyoncé performed a chair dance.

== Personnel ==
Credits are adapted from the album's liner notes and the singer's official website.

Song credits

- Writing – Miguel Jontel Pimentel, Beyoncé Knowles, Justin Timberlake, Timothy Mosley, Jerome Harmon, James Fauntleroy
- Production – Timbaland, Knowles
- Co-production – Harmon
- Vocals production – Knowles
- Recording – Stuart White, Chris Godbey; Jungle City Studios, Oven Studios, New York City
- Second engineering – Ramon Rivas
- Assistant engineering – Matt Weber
- Background vocals – Beyoncé, Timberlake
- Guitar – Mike Scott
- Bass – Dwayne Wright
- Audio mixing – Chris Godbey
- Assistant mix engineering – Chris Cannon
- Audio mastering – Tom Coyne, Aya Merrill; Sterling Sound, New York City

Video credits

- Directors – Knowles, Ed Burke, Bill Kirstein
- Directors of photography – Kirstein, Steve Romano, Jackson Hunt
- Executive producers – Rob Galluzzo, Erinn Williams
- Producers – Carly Hugo, Kirstein, Tracey-Lee Permall
- Co-producer – Luke Kenny
- Production companies – Loveless, Parkwood Entertainment
- Stylists – Ty Hunter, Raquel Smith
- Additional styling – Tim White
- Production designer – Philip Dorling
- Editor – Jonathan Wing
- Brand manager – Melissa Vargas
- Color correction – Ron Sudul
- Visual effects – The Brigadem Alexander Moors
- Assistant editors – Jonatán López, Joe Sinopoli
- Photography – Robin Harper

== Certifications ==
Region	Certification	Certified units/sales
Brazil (Pro-Música Brasil)	Gold	30,000^{‡}
New Zealand (RMNZ)	Gold	15,000^{‡}
United States (RIAA)	Platinum	1,000,000^{‡}
^{‡} Sales+streaming figures based on certification alone.
