= IB3 =

IB3 may refer to:

- IB3 (TV channel), Spanish broadcaster
- Infinity Blade III, role-playing iOS game
- Ingrid Burley, American rapper formerly known as "IB3"
