= Sugar Symphony =

EP by Chloe x Halle
- Released: April 29, 2016
- Recorded: 2016
- Length: 16:06
- Labels: Parkwood Entertainment; Columbia
- Producers: Chloe Bailey; Shane Brown; Hit-Boy; Hazebanga; Samir Alikhanizadeh; Pierre-Luc Rioux; XSDTRK

Chloe x Halle chronology
Uncovered (2013)	Sugar Symphony (2016)	The Two of Us (2017)

Singles from Sugar Symphony
- 1. "Drop" Released: April 5, 2016; 2. "Fall" Released: September 29, 2016

Sugar Symphony is the debut extended play by American duo Chloe x Halle. It was released on April 29, 2016, by Parkwood Entertainment and Columbia. The EP was their first release since being signed to Beyoncé's label. Sugar Symphony features their debut single, "Drop"—its accompanying music video was produced by Shane Brown and directed by Andy Hines and currently has over six million views on YouTube.

In March 2016, Michelle Obama introduced Chloe and Halle at the White House Easter Egg Roll, where they performed "Fall" from the EP, alongside Michelle Obama's "This Is For My Girls" and an unreleased track, "Baby Bird". In June, they performed "Drop" at the YouTube Music Foundry in New York City, and later in the month at the BET Awards 2016 in Los Angeles. In July, they performed songs from the EP as a supporting act for the European leg of Beyoncé's The Formation World Tour.

== Track listing ==
Sugar Symphony
No.	Title	Writer(s)	Length
1.	"Drop"	Chloe Bailey; Halle Bailey	3:10
2.	"Red Lights"	C. Bailey; H. Bailey; Rashad Muhammad; Chauncey Hollis	3:17
3.	"Lazy Love"	C. Bailey; H. Bailey; Philip Plested; Samir Alikhanizadeh	3:22
4.	"Thunder"	C. Bailey; H. Bailey; Pierre-Luc Rioux; Yonatan Ayal; Paris Jones	3:39
5.	"Fall"	C. Bailey; H. Bailey	2:38
Total length:			16:06

== Personnel ==
- Chloe Bailey – vocals (all tracks), production (tracks 1, 2, 4, 5)
- Halle Bailey – vocals (all tracks)
- Shane Brown – production (tracks 1, 5)
- Chauncey "Hit-Boy" Hollis – production (track 2)
- Rashad "Hazebanga" Muhammad – production (track 2)
- Samir Alikhanizadeh – production (track 3)
- Yonatan "xSDTRK" Ayal – production (track 4)
- Pierre-Luc Rioux – production (track 4)
- Tony Maserati – mixing (tracks 1–3)
- James Krausse – mixing (track 4, 5)
- Dave Kutch – mastering (all tracks)

== Release history ==
Region	Date	Format	Label	Ref.
Worldwide	29 April 2016	Digital download; streaming	Parkwood Entertainment; Columbia	
