= Shining (song) =

Single by DJ Khaled featuring Beyoncé and Jay-Z

from the album Grateful
- Released: February 12, 2017
- Recorded: 2016
- Studio: We the Best Studios (Miami, FL); Jerusalem (Los Angeles, CA); The Carter Estate (Los Angeles, CA)
- Genre: Hip-hop
- Length: 4:41
- Label: We the Best; Epic
- Songwriters: Khaled Khaled; Beyoncé Knowles-Carter; Shawn Carter; Floyd Hills; Ingrid Burley; Jahron Brathwaite; Burt Bacharach; Hal David
- Producer: DJ Khaled

DJ Khaled singles chronology
"Do You Mind" (2016)	"Shining" (2017)	"I'm the One" (2017)

Beyoncé singles chronology
"All Night" (2016)	"Shining" (2017)	"Mi Gente" (remix) (2017)

Jay-Z singles chronology
"I Got the Keys" (2016)	"Shining" (2017)	"Biking" (2017)

"Shining" is a song by DJ Khaled as the lead single from his tenth studio album, Grateful (2017). The song features vocals from American singer Beyoncé and American rapper Jay-Z. The song was released on February 12, 2017, by We the Best and Epic Records. The song contains a sample of Osunlade's 2013 recording "Dionne" which itself samples 1970's "Walk the Way You Talk" by Dionne Warwick.

== Background ==
The song premiered following the 59th Annual Grammy Awards on February 12, 2017. The single art features Khaled's newborn son, Asahd Khaled.

== Composition ==
Written and composed by Burt Bacharach, PartyNextDoor, Jay-Z, Hal David, Ingrid Burley, Danja, DJ Khaled, and Beyoncé, the song features references to the lives and success of the Knowles-Carter couple, including the twenty-one Grammy Awards won to date by the rapper, the platinum records received by the RIAA for each album released, Knowles's twenty years of music success, and twins, Sir and Rumi (born June 18, 2017), are mentioned for the first time.

The song is performed in the key of D minor with a tempo of 112 beats per minute.

== Critical reception ==
David Turner from Pitchfork thought the track "hues closer to those moments of ecstasy than the adult contemporary rap of Jay-Z's post-Watch the Throne career… Jay-Z raps with an endearing mix of self-deprecation and premature paternal pride. Beyoncé, on the other hand, operates with full-on swagger, singing triumphantly about "winning" for the last "20 years," and flashing a smile to even the most dogged haters. Her half-rap cadence mimics the one she used on last year's "Formation," bearing all the marks of effortless skill and confidence. And as is usual, Khaled is the hype man for his own song, his usual ecstatic adlibs sprinkled throughout."

Abbie McCarthy from The Independent wrote: "The song shows three heavyweights bringing all their talents to the party – DJ Khaled has served up a smooth, crisp beat, Beyoncé delivers an awesome attitude-laden verse and then Jay-Z steps in with a new sense of life, he's back to his best bars on this."

== Track listing ==
Digital download
No.	Title	Length
1.	"Shining" (featuring Beyoncé and Jay-Z)	4:41

== Charts ==
=== Weekly charts ===
Chart (2017)	Peak position
Australia (ARIA)	93
Australia Urban (ARIA)	12
Belgium (Ultratip Bubbling Under Flanders)	17
Canada Hot 100 (Billboard)	72
France (SNEP)	74
New Zealand Heatseekers (RMNZ)	4
Scotland Singles (OCC)	45
UK Singles (OCC)	71
US Billboard Hot 100	57
US Hot R&B/Hip-Hop Songs (Billboard)	23
US Pop Airplay (Billboard)	40
US R&B/Hip-Hop Airplay (Billboard)	6
US Rhythmic Airplay (Billboard)	1

=== Year-end charts ===
Chart (2017)	Position
Belgian Urban (Ultratop Flanders)	100
US Hot R&B/Hip-Hop Songs (Billboard)	68
US Rhythmic (Billboard)	33

== Certifications ==
Region	Certification	Certified units/sales
Australia (ARIA)	Gold	35,000^{‡}
Canada (Music Canada)	Gold	40,000^{‡}
New Zealand (RMNZ)	Gold	15,000^{‡}
United Kingdom (BPI)	Silver	200,000^{‡}
United States (RIAA)	Platinum	1,000,000^{‡}
^{‡} Sales+streaming figures based on certification alone.

== Release history ==
Region	Date	Format	Label	Ref.
United States	February 14, 2017	Digital download	We the Best; Epic	
Italy	February 14, 2017	Contemporary hit radio	Sony	
United States	February 14, 2017	Rhythmic Contemporary	We the Best; Epic	
United Kingdom	February 17, 2017	Rhythmic Contemporary	Epic	
