= The Two of Us (mixtape) =

Mixtape by Chloe x Halle
- Released: March 16, 2017
- Genre: R&B; pop
- Length: 25:23
- Label: Parkwood; Columbia
- Producer: Chloe Bailey (also exec.); Halle Bailey (also exec.); Steve Lacy

Chloe x Halle chronology
Sugar Symphony (2016)	The Two of Us (2017)	The Kids Are Alright (2018)

Audio
- The Two of Us on YouTube

The Two of Us is the debut mixtape by American duo Chloe x Halle. It was released on March 16, 2017, by Parkwood Entertainment and Columbia.

== Track listing ==
No.	Title	Writer(s)	Producer(s)	Length
1.	"Used to Love"	Chloe Bailey; Halle Bailey	C. Bailey; H. Bailey	1:26
2.	"Too Much Sauce"	C. Bailey; H. Bailey; Branson Bailey	C. Bailey; H. Bailey	1:52
3.	"Future"	C. Bailey	C. Bailey; H. Bailey	0:37
4.	"Poppy Flower"	C. Bailey; H. Bailey	C. Bailey; H. Bailey	2:45
5.	"Chase"	C. Bailey	C. Bailey; H. Bailey	0:54
6.	"Partna"	C. Bailey; H. Bailey	C. Bailey	1:31
7.	"DumDumDum"	C. Bailey; H. Bailey	C. Bailey; H. Bailey	0:29
8.	"Worries" (featuring Steve Lacy)	C. Bailey; H. Bailey; Steven Lacy	C. Bailey; H. Bailey; Lacy	1:10
9.	"Upset Stomach"	C. Bailey	C. Bailey	2:16
10.	"Simple Intro"	C. Bailey; H. Bailey	C. Bailey	0:23
11.	"Simple"	C. Bailey; H. Bailey	C. Bailey	1:47
12.	"Mistake"	C. Bailey; H. Bailey	C. Bailey; H. Bailey	1:23
13.	"All I Ever Wanted"	C. Bailey	C. Bailey	0:49
14.	"Tra Ta Ta"	C. Bailey; H. Bailey	C. Bailey; H. Bailey	2:17
15.	"Up All Night"	C. Bailey	C. Bailey	2:33
16.	"Lucky Leaf"	C. Bailey; H. Bailey	C. Bailey	2:07
17.	"Lulla-Bye"	C. Bailey; H. Bailey	C. Bailey	1:34
Total length:				25:23

== Personnel ==
Production

- Chloe Bailey - executive production, production
- Halle Bailey - executive production, production (tracks 1–5, 7–8, 12–14)
- Steve Lacy - production (track 8)

Technical

- Tyler Scott - mixing, mastering
- Miles Comaskey - mixing, mastering
- Chloe Bailey - mixing, recording
- Tony Maserati - mixing (tracks 2–16)
- Halle Bailey - recording (tracks 1–5, 7–8, 14)
- Steve Lacy - recording (track 8)
