= The Formation World Tour =

2016 concert tour by Beyoncé

- World tour by Beyoncé
- Promotional poster for the tour
- Location: Europe; North America
- Associated album: Lemonade
- Start date: April 27, 2016
- End date: October 7, 2016
- No. of shows: 49
- Attendance: 2.24 million
- Box office: $256 million ($343.43 million in 2025 dollars)

Beyoncé concert chronology
- On the Run Tour (2014); Formation World Tour (2016); On the Run II Tour (2018)

The Formation World Tour was the fifth concert tour by American singer-songwriter Beyoncé in support of her sixth studio album, Lemonade (2016). The all-stadium tour was announced following her guest appearance at the Super Bowl 50 halftime show. This was her first solo all-stadium tour and the first ever all-stadium tour by a female artist. The tour started on April 27, 2016 at Marlins Park in Miami, Florida and concluded on October 7, 2016 at MetLife Stadium in East Rutherford, New Jersey. The tour's title is in reference to the album's lead single "Formation".

The tour's production and staging consisted of a 60 foot tall rotating LED cuboid referred to as the 'Monolith', a treadmill runway and a secondary stage that stores and produces 2,000 gallons of water. The theme of the tour was described as following the same linear chapters to that of the tour's supporting album Lemonade, with each rotation of the aforementioned 'Monolith' representing a new chapter of the show. Several music critics gave the show positive reviews, with a variety of publications praising both the tour's production and Beyoncé's performance and vocal abilities. The tour had a variety of notable opening acts, including a number of special guests joining prominent opener DJ Khaled on stage. Supporting acts also included artists signed to Beyoncé's own management company, Parkwood Entertainment, such as the duo Chloe x Halle, who were just starting their careers at that time.

The Formation World Tour ranked at #1 and #2 on Pollstar's 2016 mid-year Top 100 Tours chart both in North America and worldwide respectively, with a total mid-year worldwide gross of $137.3 million from the first 25 shows (including $126.3 million from the first North American leg of the tour). In total, the tour grossed $256 million from 49 sold-out shows according to Billboard Boxscore, and ranked at #2 on Pollstar's 2016 Year End Tours chart.

== Background and development ==
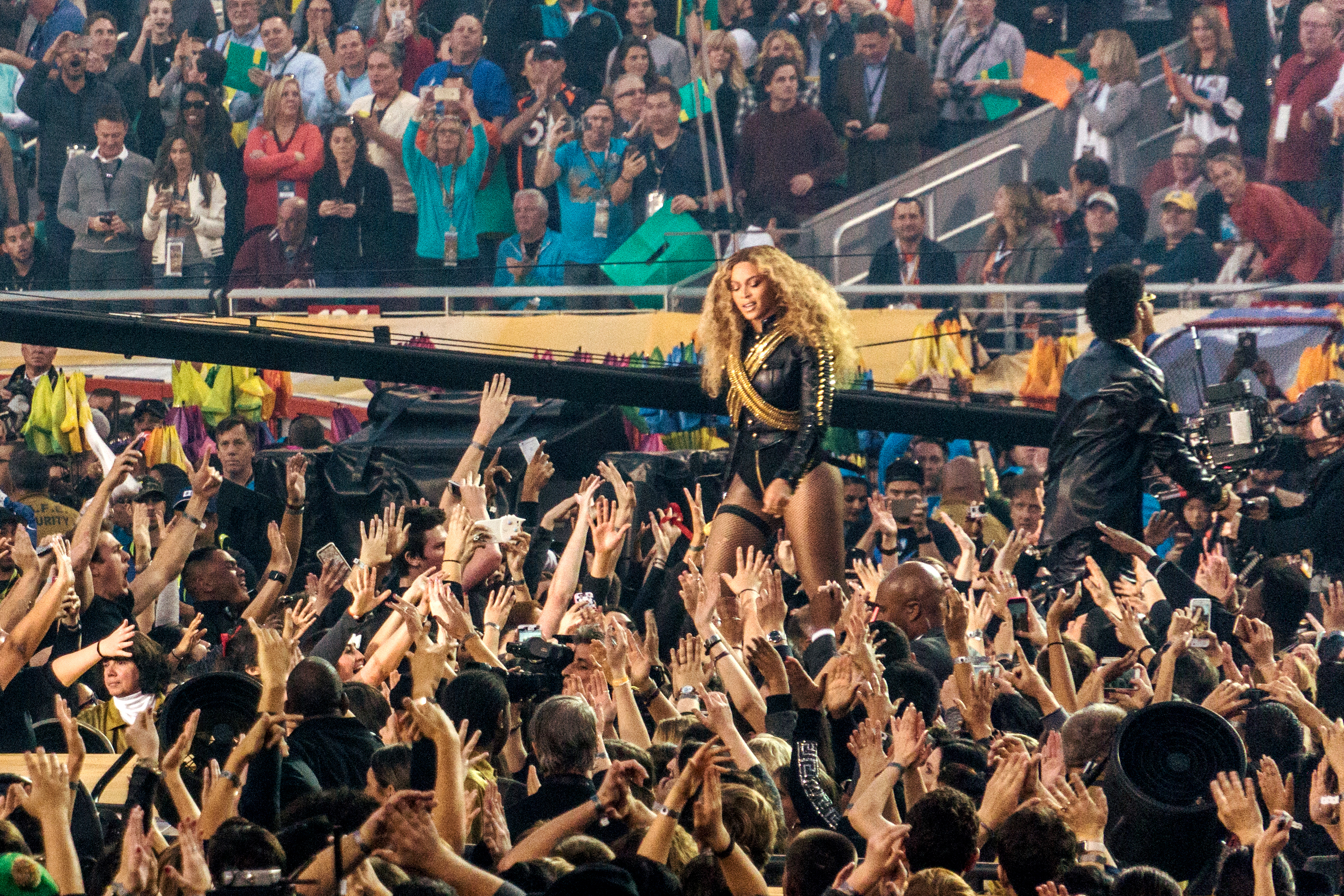
The tour was announced following Beyoncé's guest appearance at the Super Bowl 50 halftime show.

On February 6, 2016, Beyoncé released "Formation" for free on the music streaming service TIDAL and its accompanying music video on her official YouTube. The following day on February 7, 2016, Beyoncé performed "Formation" during her guest appearance at the Super Bowl 50 halftime show. Immediately after the performance, a commercial aired announcing The Formation World Tour, which would kick off in Miami on April 27, with the first pre-sales going on sale just two days after the announcement on February 9, 2016.

Leading up to the tour announcement, Beyoncé was praised and criticized over her new song and Black Panther-influenced costume for the Super Bowl halftime performance. As a result of this, the hashtags "#BoycottBeyonce" and "#IStandWithBeyonce" begun trending on social media platforms such as Twitter. A group of protesters also planned to stage an "anti-Beyoncé" rally outside of the NFL's headquarters in New York City on the day general sale of tickets went for sale. However, the planned rally was met with zero protesters and instead dozens of Beyoncé supporters who held a counter-protest. The tour's associated album Lemonade was released four days prior to the start of the tour. In a press release by Live Nation Entertainment following the tour's announcement, it was revealed that The Formation World Tour would be supporting local United Way of America programs, as well as the Flint water crisis. After the first North American leg of the tour was completed, it was announced that fans, who had the option to add a donation to the Flint water crisis when purchasing tickets, had raised $82,234 for the cause. In the same press release, Beyoncé's partnership with THX was announced, with the purpose of providing the highest level of audio quality at concerts for the duration of the tour. Following on from the aforementioned controversy over "Formation", The Miami Fraternal Order of Police were reported to be pushing for a national boycott of police officers working the security for the concert, ahead of the tour's opening night in Miami. Other police departments reportedly pushing to avoid the concert included Tampa and Nashville, Tennessee; however a Tampa police spokesperson stated that these 'boycotts' had been blown "way out of proportion".

Rehearsals for the tour took place at Tampa's Raymond James Stadium, which was rented by Live Nation for $745,000. TSA board member Thomas Scott spoke on the large-scale production of the tour after seeing the stage during rehearsals, stating "that's one of the largest stages they ever put up, I don't think I've seen a stage that size". During the same rehearsal period, members of Beyoncé's team met with more than 20 Tampa leaders, including the Tampa Police Chief, for a private luncheon in Ybor City, in which they discussed ways to make Tampa a better city, resulting in Beyoncé making multiple financial pledges to certain initiatives.

== Stage ==
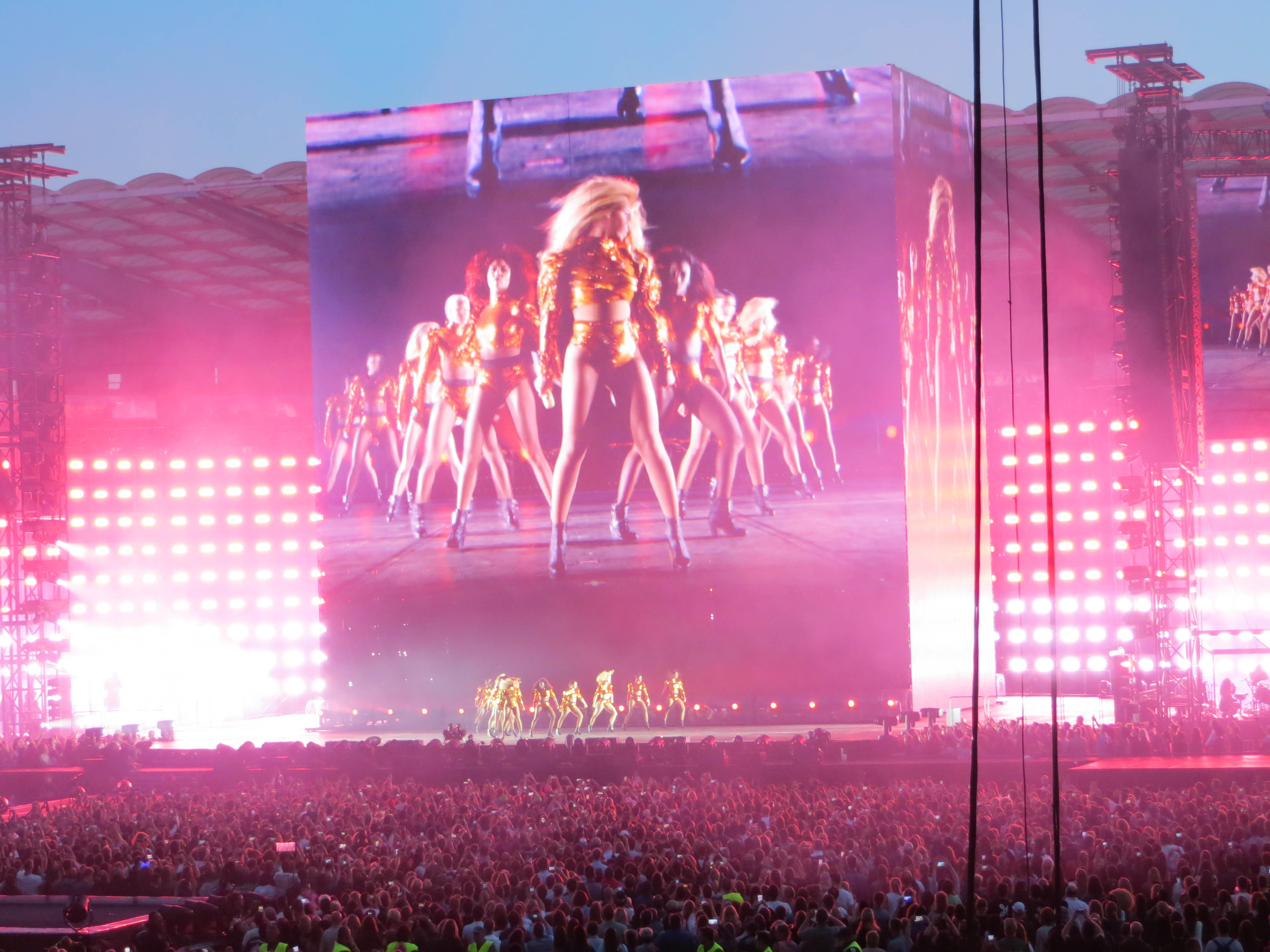
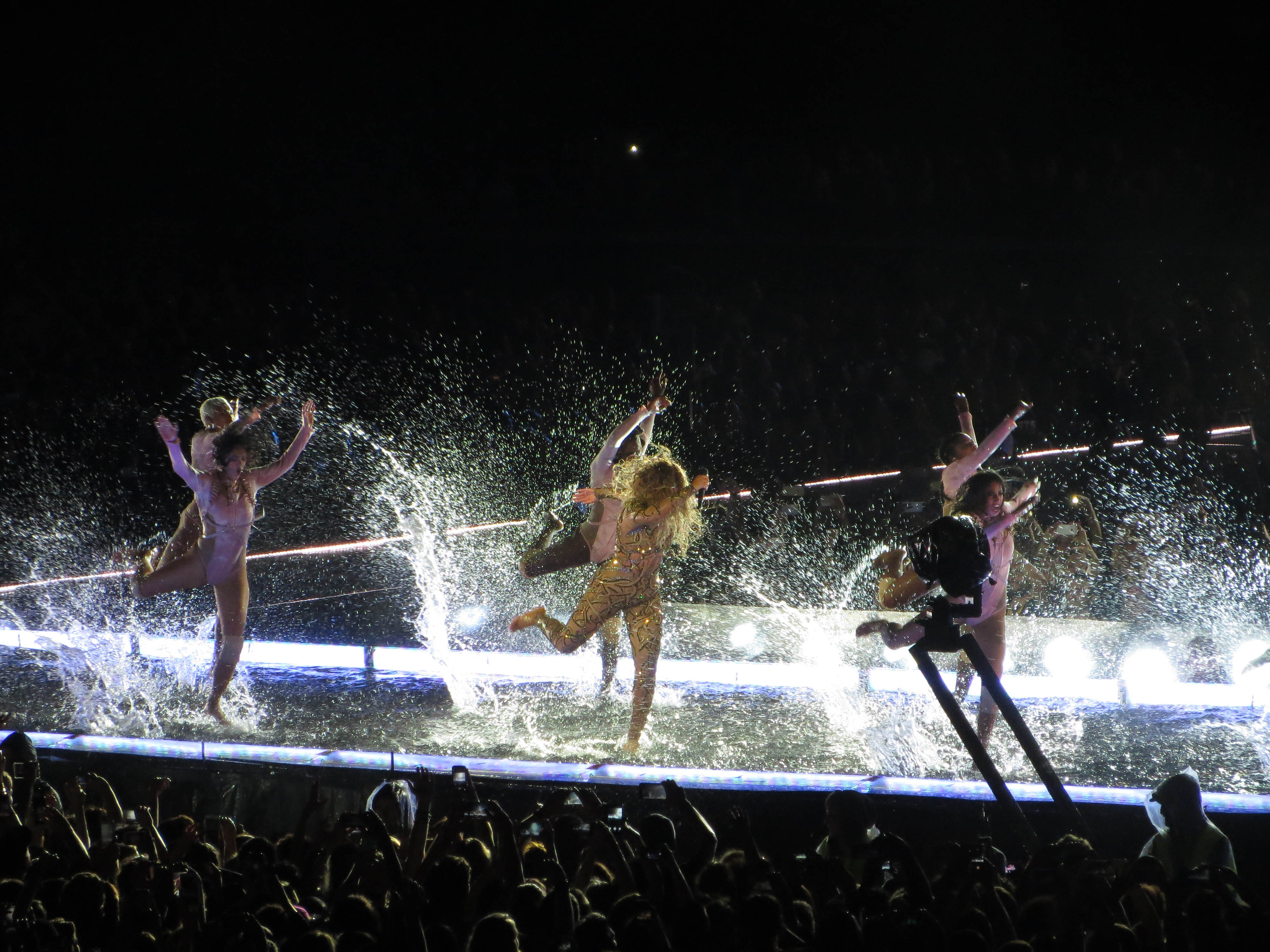
The focal point of the tour's main-stage was a 60 feet tall rotating cuboid, nicknamed the 'Monolith' by designers (top). The tour's B-stage fills with 2,000 gallons of water towards the end of the show, in which Beyoncé and her dancers perform (bottom).

The stage for the tour was described as "a game-changer for what can be achieved in a stadium touring environment. The entire collaboration from scenic, to structure, to mechanics was custom-made to create an epic experience for both Beyoncé and her fans". Designed by Es Devlin and engineered and built collaboratively by Stageco and Tait Towers, the tour's stage features a centerpiece of a revolving 60 foot tall box, made with video screen walls. Known as the 'Monolith', Devlin spoke on the box stating of "wanting this to be the tallest object in the stadium, a piece of kinetic stadium architecture the equivalent of a seven-story, revolving LED building". Devlin also commented the box was perceived as "a giant 3D billboard, a huge LED armor within which Beyoncé is revealed as an all-too-human-scale, real-life figure" and noted that Beyoncé was heavily involved in the creative process of every inch of stages design. The rotations of the box were said to represent a new chapter of the show, in a similar chapter line to that of Lemonade. The box takes approximately 4 minutes to achieve one rotation.

The stage also consists of a runway, which also acts as a treadmill leading onto a B-stage that fills with a pool of water. The treadmill on the catwalk was designed to be waterproof in order to withstand unpredictable weather found in outdoor stadiums. The B-stage stores 2,000 gallons of water inside of it and takes approximately 10 minutes to fill up, which occurs without the audience even realizing. The inspiration for the water within the B-stage was inspired by the tour's supporting album Lemonade, in particularly the song "Forward", as the songs message is described as a turning point from anger to forgiveness. "The pool of water is the antithesis to the fire-spitting monolith; the most joyful, redemptive sequence of the show takes place here, from "Freedom" through to "Halo"", stated Devlin. The tour's stage and production was said to be so large that the maximum capacity of some venues was reduced in order to make space for it. A writer for the Belfast Telegraph stated that the maximum capacity for Beyoncé's concert in Dublin at Croke Park was reduced from 82,500 to 75,000 people to allow for the size of the stage, with event organizer Eamon Fox stating "It's a jaw-dropping production and stage show and one of the biggest that's ever been in Croke Park".

== Costume design ==
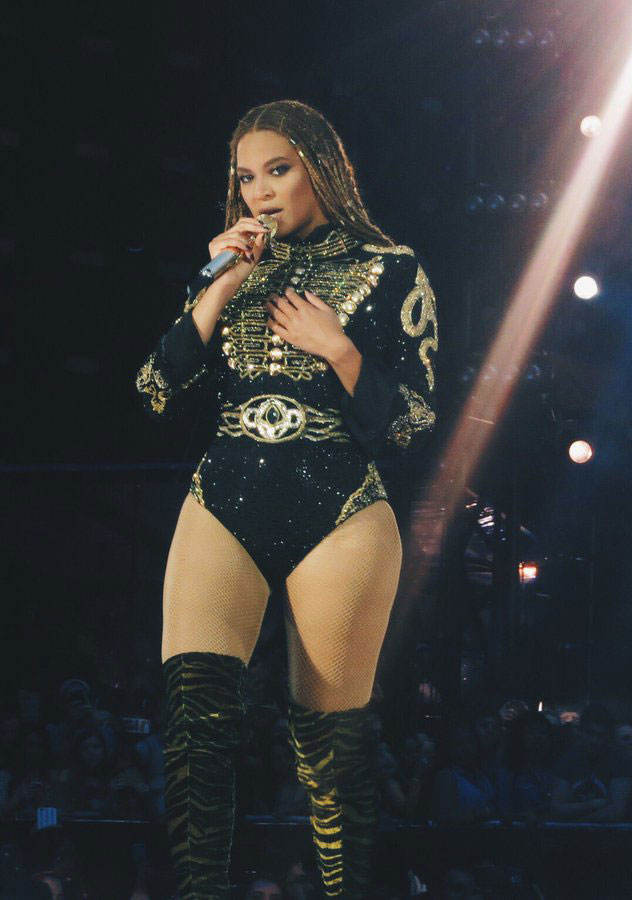
Beyoncé worked with a variety of designers for her tour costumes, including a piece by Peter Dundas of Roberto Cavalli (pictured).

Beyoncé worked with a variety of designers for her on-stage costumes during the tour. All styled by Beyoncé's stylist, Marni Senofonte, references of the tour's costumes were compared to that of the wild west, the "antebellum south", Africa and BDSM. The opening outfit consisted of a Victorian-inspired look created by Dean and Dan Caten (DSQUARED^{2}), complete with a crystal embroidered bustier and an oversized western style hat. The hats for Beyoncé and her dancers were made by Baron Hats. The outfit also included leather gloves and a "tattoo lace" bodysuit. Balmain too produced a Victorian themed floral white bodysuit, which contained hand-embroidered pearls, crystals and glass beads. The outfit was accompanied with matching suede boots. Peter Dundas of Roberto Cavalli produced an all-over black crystal embroidered bodysuit for the tour, which also included gold metallic thread and accompanying knee high tiger print boots in a military style. Alessandro Michele working for Gucci designed a sequined bodysuit for Beyoncé, incorporating a geometric print and a red mink fur coat. London based designer Atsuko Kudo designed and produced a more simple bodysuit for the tour, creating an all red latex outfit with shoulder pads and a ruffled neckline. Kudo also stated that in order to make the outfit, a life sized cast of Beyoncé was used in order to fit the latex accurately to her body. Beyoncé also requested to Kudo that the outfit was in sync with the antebellum theme which runs through the tour's supporting album Lemonade, which influenced the inclusion of frills across the chest and scooping neckline. It was also noted how Beyoncé performed barefoot in water during one performance, whilst wearing a simple sequined bodysuit. Beyoncé also sported a Givenchy haute couture by Riccardo Tisci bronze bodysuit, showing an exposed midriff. Beyonce commissioned several ensembles from Inbal Dror, a designer notable for "attention-demanding details like sheer cup corsets, dramatic cut-outs and slits, and barely there silhouettes" for the Tour.

During Beyoncé's hometown performance in Houston, Texas, Gucci provided another costume for Beyoncé: a custom bodysuit created with "ruched tulle and sequins and embellished with a black-beaded panther". During the London shows of the tour, Beyoncé debuted a gold leotard covered in 70,000 Swarovski crystals, designed by Julien Macdonald. The outfit also contained 24 carat gold embroidered components. Fishnet tights worn in accompaniment with the tour's outfits were hand dyed in crock pots in order to correctly match the varying skin tones of Beyoncé's dancers. Notable merchandise sold to fans during the tour included "Hot Sauce" tote bags, a nod to the line in her single "Formation", and "Boycott Beyoncé" T-shirts, which were a nod to the aforementioned controversy Beyoncé received after her Super Bowl 50 halftime show.

== Concert synopsis ==
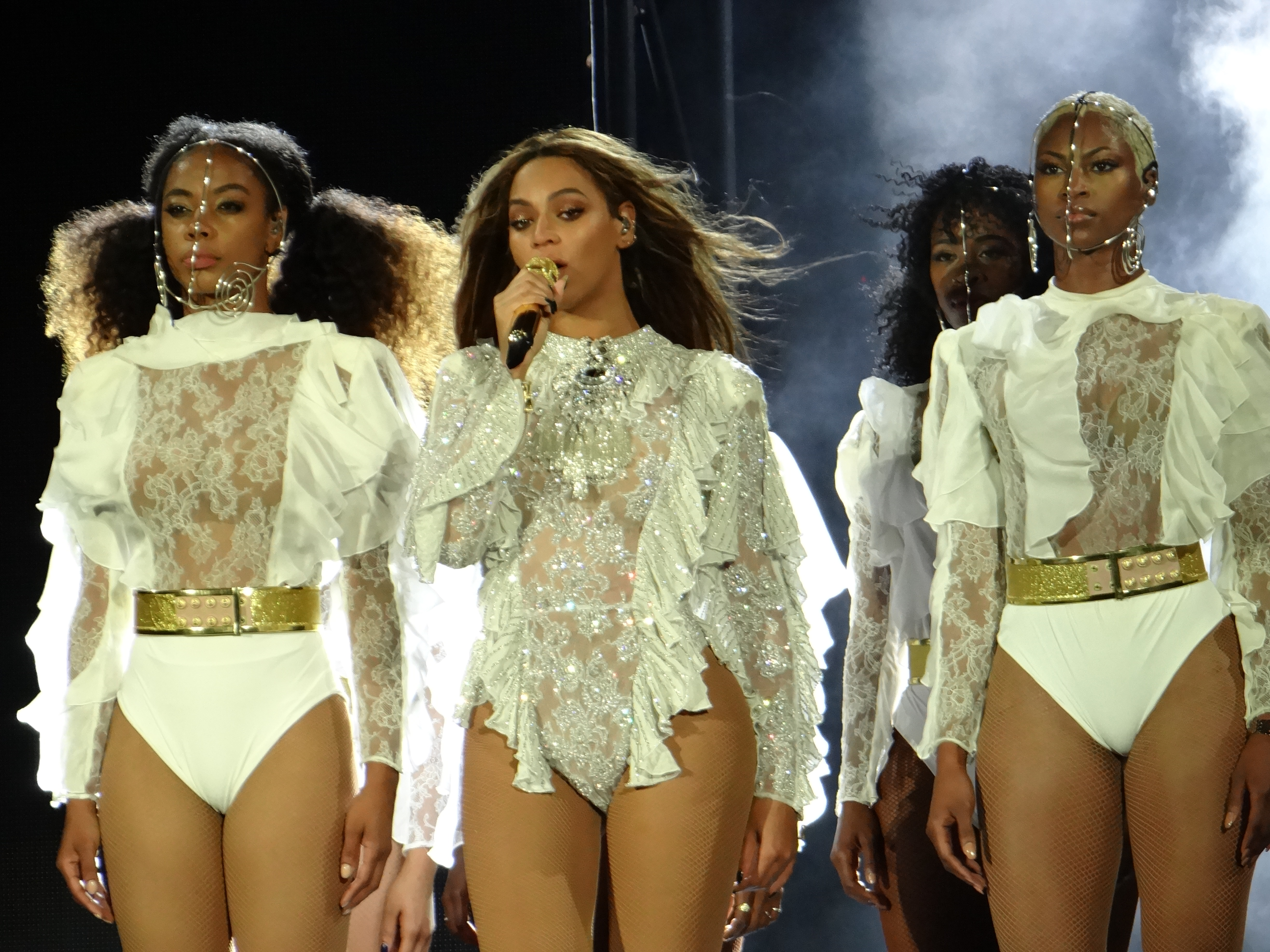
Beyoncé performing with her dancers

Throughout the concert, a large, rotating LED screen is featured centre stage, projecting live images of Beyoncé and her twenty backup dancers to the audience. The concerts begins with Beyoncé performing "Formation", alongside her all-female dancers shadowing her and performing a choreography. "Angry" red lighting and pyrotechnics are displayed as "Sorry", "Bow Down" and "Run the World (Girls)" are subsequently performed. "Mine", "Baby Boy" and "Hold Up" are performed next, which then seamlessly transition into "Countdown". During this performance, Beyoncé and her dancers perform and walk down a catwalk leading to the middle of the crowd. Between sets and costume changes, video clips from Lemonade are projected onto the LED cuboid, as well as aerial dancers performing a choreography. Before performing "Me Myself and I" Beyoncé would often stop and talk to the crowd, speaking on the relationship she and the audience have with God and themselves. This act of the show was ended with a performance of "All Night" which Beyoncé stated was her favourite song from her aforementioned new album. "Don't Hurt Yourself" was performed with many interchangeable snippets of other songs including "Ring the Alarm" and "Independent Women". The next act consisted of Beyoncé and her dancers performing more up-tempo numbers, such as "Feeling Myself", "Yoncé", "Drunk in Love" and "Partition". Another costume change took place, and the show continued with Beyoncé and her dancers performing "Daddy Lessons" and "1+1". This was then followed by Beyoncé performing an a cappella rendition of "Love On Top", which was said to connect Beyoncé with her fans and break down the space between them.

The first of two tributes to Prince is seen as Beyoncé performs a rendition of "The Beautiful Ones". This is then followed by the large LED cuboid on stage lighting up in complete purple, as an original recording of "Purple Rain" is played to the audience. The stage is then seen to contain human sized boxes, in which Beyoncé and her dancers perform inside of, in sync to the 2014 remix of "Crazy in Love", which is then followed by "Naughty Girl". The final act of the show is performed in a large pool of water on the tour's secondary stage. Here Beyoncé and her dancers perform a choreography and splash in the water to "Freedom", "Survivor", "End of Time" and the shows closing number, "Halo". During "Halo" Beyoncé sings alone, starting the performance on her knees in the pool of water. As the concert concludes, Beyoncé was described as standing on stage "drenched, hair sopping, makeup running and her exhausted body looking at once all but human".

== Critical reception ==
=== North America ===
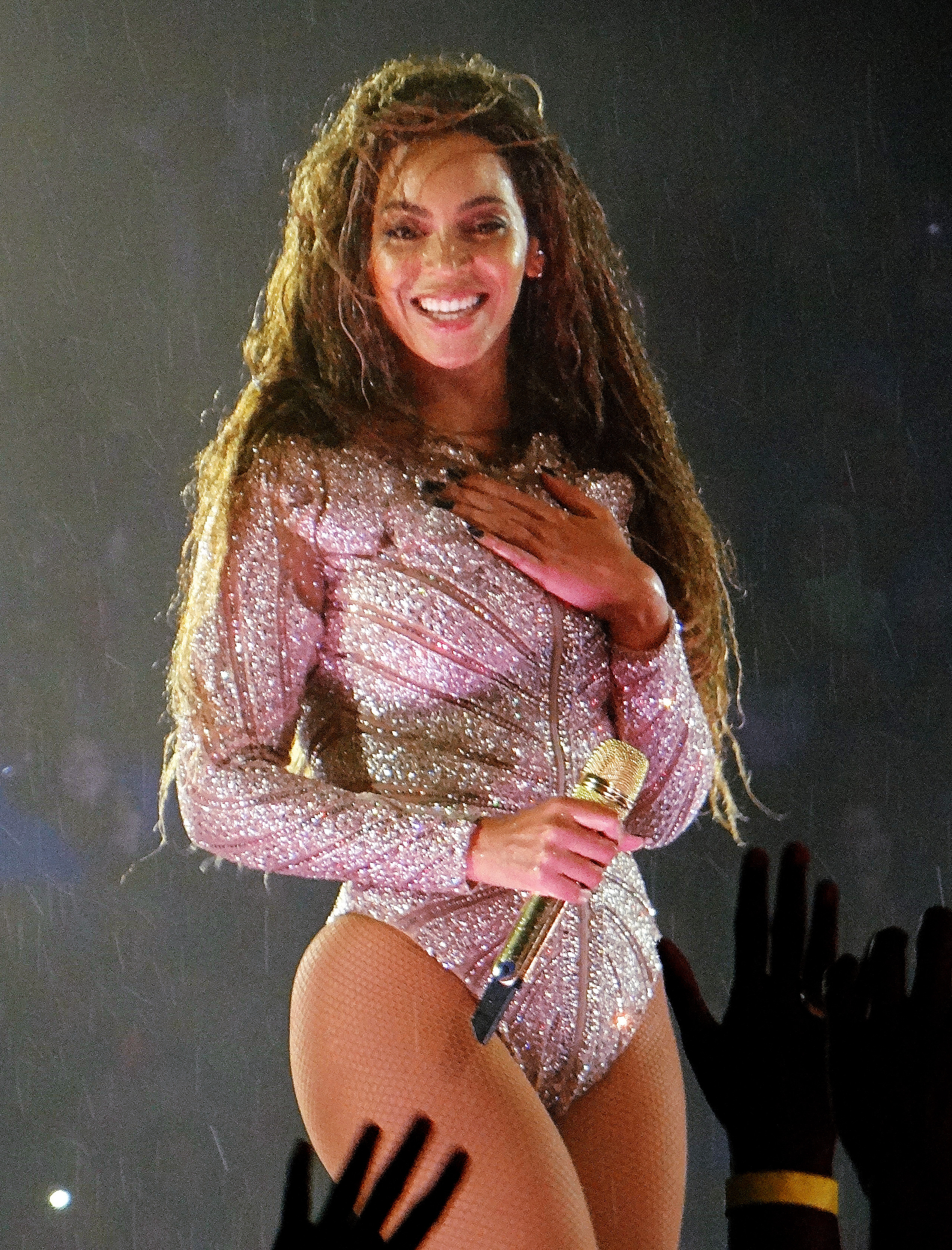
Beyoncé performing in Raleigh, North Carolina, during the tour's opening leg

The opening night of the tour received rave reviews from critics. Hermione Hoby of The Guardian awarded the concert 5 stars, stating "She sounds, moves and looks like a goddess and most of us 'bow down' accordingly". Kelli Kennedy writing for the Associated Press noted that Beyoncé "slays at tour opening" and further commented "her commanding performance of "Freedom" served as reminder to the world that she 'breaks chains all by myself. I'm gonna keep running because a runner don't quit on herself'". Becky Randel of Billboard felt that emotion guided the mood for the evening and stated that "Bey was overcome when the audience knew all the lyrics to her new song, "Hold Up" and she often stopped to smile or nod at her exuberant BeyHive. Writing for Rolling Stone, Kat Bein said Beyoncé was "a prime example of entertainment and a vision of an artist at her apex" and later commented "the show was a visual feast as well as an emotional tour de force, packed with fireworks, confetti, rearranging stage designs and aerial dancers".

Other reviews from the North American leg of the tour included Melissa Ruggierie writing for The Atlanta Journal-Constitution online blog. Ruggierie praised Beyoncé's performance, particularly the strong vocals demonstrated in "1+1" and concluded "watching her command a stadium stage for two hours was another reminder of her limitless ambition". However, it was noted that Beyoncé did not speak to the crowd very often. After Beyoncé's hometown performance in Houston, Brandon Caldwell of the Houston Press introduced his article stating "Hours after the slaying, the wig snatching, the fitted snatching, the life getting, the boy byes and various curses of shock, amazement and confusion, I stood with a perplexed look on my face. How? How does Beyoncé do this? On this level? With this magnitude?". Lorraine Ali of the Los Angeles Times concluded her positive review of the Pasadena stop of the tour with "Soaking wet and sitting onstage alone, she left the audience with the closing number, "Halo". She'd been baptized and reborn into a less-perfect version of Queen Bey, allowing a more powerful Beyoncé to arise from that imperfection". Jim Harrington of the San Jose Mercury News began his article stating "there were so many moving parts – a tremendous swirl of sharply choreographed dance routines, cool special effects, brilliant fireworks and other tactics for delighting tens of thousands", Harrington noted however that too many snippets of songs rather than their full versions were performed, feeling quality over quantity was missed. The first Canadian show of the tour in Edmonton was performed in cold and rainy conditions, with Beyoncé stating "Can you feel your fingers? I can't feel mine" and "I have to say this is the coldest show I've ever done". Despite this, Sandra Sperounes of the Edmonton Journal commented "not even rain or bitter wind could stop our Ms. Flawless, our Survivor, our Queen Bey from dazzling an estimated 40,000 fans at Commonwealth Stadium on a stormy Friday night." Sperounes concluded "the sun was nowhere to be found, but thanks to Bey's brilliant set, the crowd left beaming with giddiness, girl power and generosity".

By the end of 2019, The Formation World Tour was named the best tour of the decade (2010s) by Consequence of Sound. Rolling Stone included the performance on their list of the 50 Greatest Concerts of the Last 50 Years, in 2017.

=== Europe ===
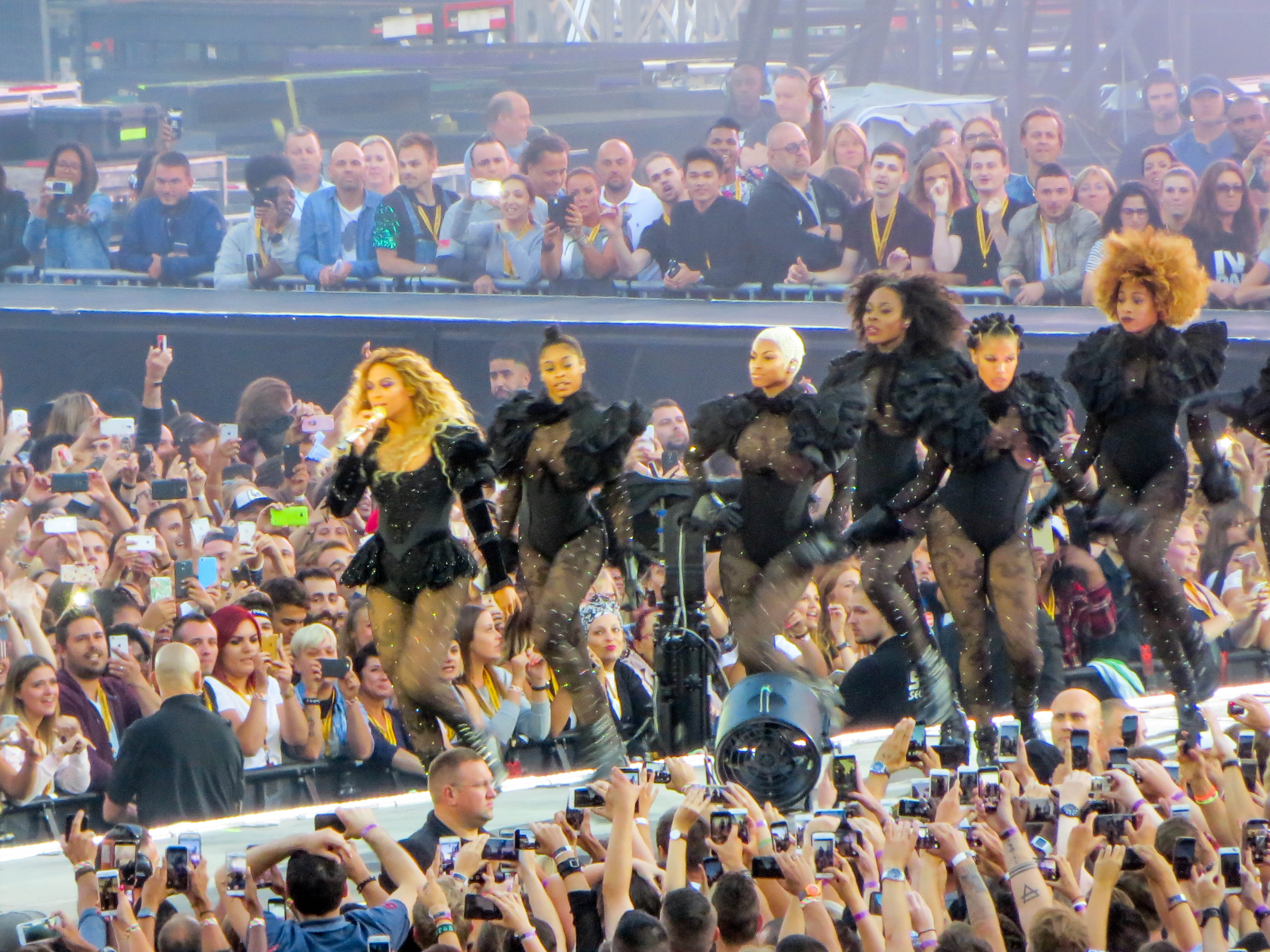
Beyoncé performing on the stage's catwalk, which connects the main stage to the B-stage.

A writer for Radio DeeJay reviewing the tour's stop in Milan, Italy, introduced their article saying "Those who were there will remember for years: Beyoncé [at] the San Siro stadium in Milan was more than a concert". The writer continued to praised the shows stage, visuals and Beyoncé's choreography and live singing before concluding the review with "Beyoncé has proven beyond doubt to be the best performer and one of the best singers our time". Mathilde Doiezie of Le Figaro ended his positive review of the Saint-Denis show with "A moment of grace concluded by Halo sung open heart, kneeling in water, face still dripping. Cannons plan glitter to indicate the end of the siege. After two hours of concert, not a minute more, Beyoncé returned backstage. Leaving there speechless tens of thousands of spectators who came to worship their pop idol". A writer for Metro International France speaking on the same show praised the tour's production stating it was the greatest show the Stade de France had seen since the U2 360° Tour. However, the article also felt the show lacked emotion in certain parts, noting Beyoncé did not mention the 2016 Nice truck attack that happened one week prior to the concert.

== Commercial performance ==
=== Ticket sales ===
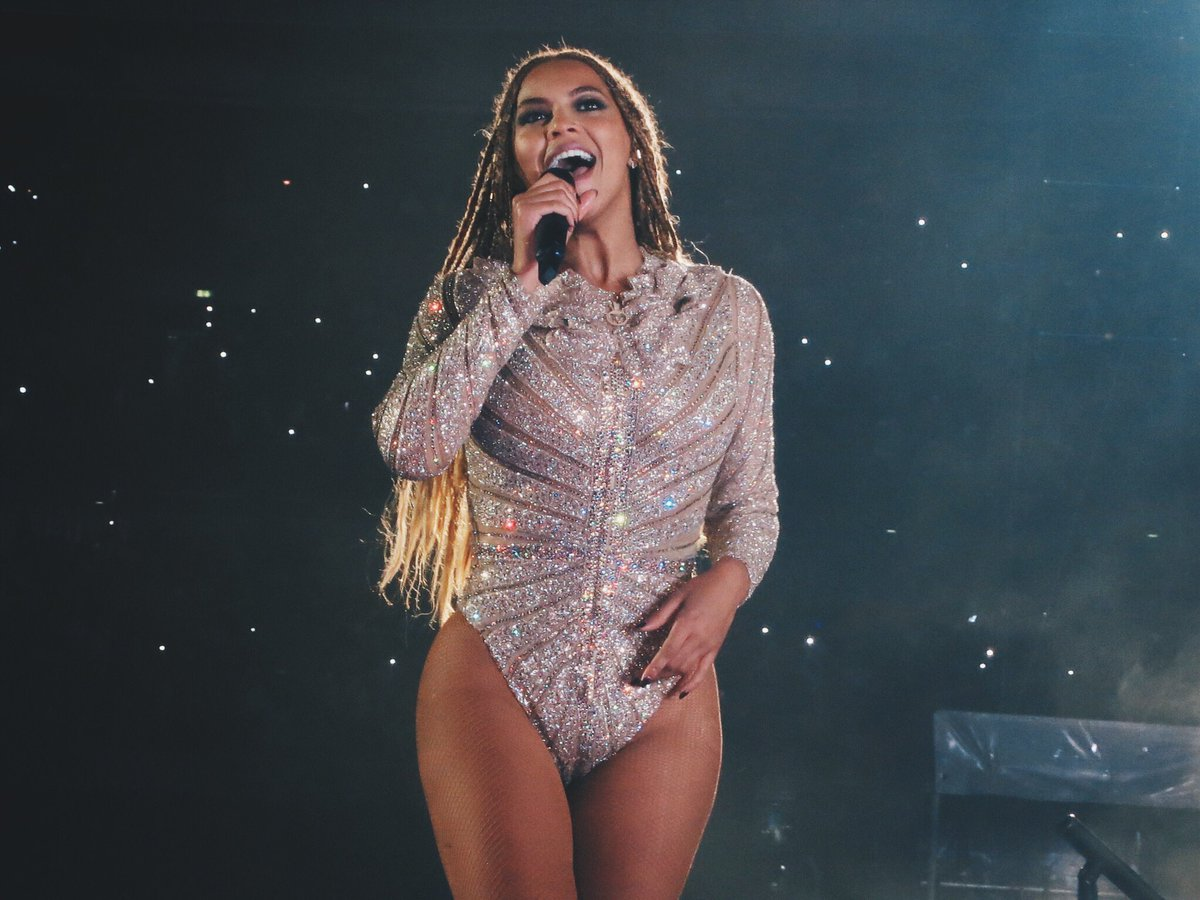
Beyoncé performing during the second of two shows at Wembley Stadium in London. The second concert was added due to the first selling out in under 30 minutes.

Following the announcement of the tour, Beyoncé's website temporarily crashed, as a result of the post-Super Bowl advertisement. After the first round of North American ticket pre-sales, a second show at New York City's Citi Field was added to the itinerary, due to the high demand. During the first round of the European general sale, Beyoncé's performance at Amsterdam Arena sold out within 20 minutes, prompting a waiting list to be opened and promoters attempting to organise a second show. Some Swedish fans were left unhappy due to the speed tickets sold out for the Friends Arena date of the tour, with complaints being made about the queueing system implemented by Ticketmaster. Ticketmaster apologised and stated "unfortunately, there were more who wanted tickets than what was available." The UK shows were met with huge commercial success, with all tickets being sold in under 30 minutes, including 90,000 tickets at London's Wembley Stadium. Many fans shared their displeasure online with not being able to secure tickets, and, as is usual with in-demand concert tours, many tickets found their way onto the secondary market place with a large markup on the original price. As a result of this, a second London show was added to the schedule, set for July 3, 2016.

After the first round of dates for the North American general sale opened to the public, an additional show was added at Chicago's Soldier Field, due to the "overwhelming demand". Jesse Lawrence of Forbes reported that on the secondary market, tickets for The Formation World Tour were averaging at $432 before the tickets hit the general public. On February 17, 2016, Live Nation gave a press release announcing that nearly 1 million tickets had already been sold for the tour in 48 hours, including sell-outs in Miami, Arlington, Pasadena, Toronto, Chicago, Foxborough, Philadelphia, New York City, Baltimore, Sunderland, London, Manchester, Dublin, Amsterdam and Stockholm. On May 5, 2016, a second wave of US dates were announced, including 7 new shows and a rescheduled date for the previously postponed Nashville show. After her performance in Minneapolis, it was announced that Beyoncé was the first female to headline a stadium show in the Minneapolis–Saint Paul area, held at TCF Bank Stadium.

=== Boxscore ===
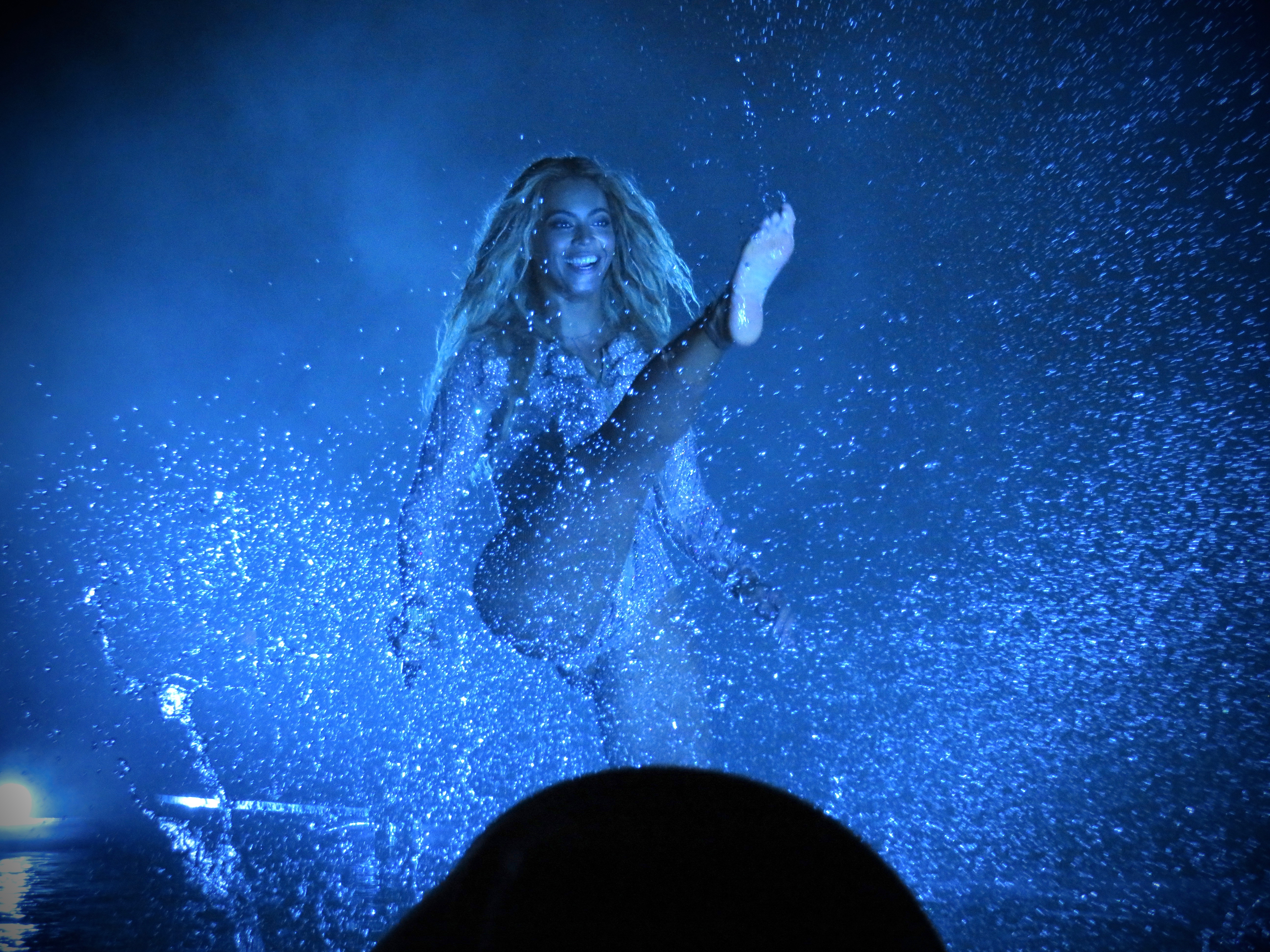
The Formation World Tour grossed $256,084,556 with a total attendance of 2,242,099 people

Chairman of Live Nation Global Touring Arthur Fogel confirmed in an article with Billboard that The Formation World Tour had already exceeded $100 million in gross revenue, as well as stating that Nashville's Nissan Stadium date of the tour, which had gone on sale the day of the article, had already sold 33,000 tickets and grossed $4 million. In July 2016, Pollstar's top 100 worldwide and North American tours charts were announced. Beyoncé ranked at #1 in North America with a domestic gross of $126.3 million from the first North America leg of the tour, and at #2 with $137.3 million on the worldwide chart, accounting for the first 25 shows of the tour.

According to Billboard Boxscore, the first North American leg of the tour generated $123 million in ticket sales and played to 972,719 fans over 23 sold-out shows. These included a two night stint at Chicago's Soldier Field, playing for 89,270 people and two nights at New York City's Citi Field, playing for 73,486. The highest grossing single show of the leg was at Los Angeles' Rose Bowl, playing for 55,736 and grossing $7.1 million. In Europe, the tour continued to be a success, with another 17 sold-out shows being reported by Billboard. The leg included two sell out nights at London's Wembley Stadium, playing for 142,500 fans and grossing $15.3 million, the sixth largest boxscore of the year reported by Billboard at the time of the article. The highest attended stop of the European stint, and the tour overall, was at Saint-Denis' Stade de France, which played to a crowd of 75,106 people. The leg grossed $86.9 million and played for 867,025 people in total. Following the final leg of the tour being reported to Billboard Boxscore, the tour's total gross revenue reached $256,084,556, with total attendance topping out at 2,242,099. Beyoncé, with The Formation World Tour, also ranked at #2 on Pollstar's annual Year End Top Worldwide Tours chart. Other Pollstar year end charts showed that Beyoncé's two performances at Wembley Stadium during the tour were the 6th largest grossing shows of the year worldwide, whilst the tour's two stops at New York City's Citi Field were the 5th highest-grossing concerts within the US. Chris Hunt, writing for ticket merchant AXS, reported that The Formation World Tour was one of the top 20 highest-grossing tours of all time. Hunt also noted that within the same top 20, the tour had the fewest shows.

=== Venue records ===
Venue records of The Formation World Tour
Dates (2016)	Venue	Country	Description
April 27	Marlins Park	United States	First ever concert at the venue.
April 29	Raymond James Stadium	United States	First black act to headline a concert at the venue.
May 3	Carter–Finley Stadium	United States	First female act to headline a concert at the venue.
May 9	AT&T Stadium	United States	First black soloist to headline a concert at the venue.
May 12	Qualcomm Stadium	United States	First black and female act to headline a concert at the venue.
May 14	Rose Bowl	United States	First female soloist to headline a concert at the venue.
May 16 and September 17	Levi's Stadium	United States	First black act to headline one and two shows on a single tour.
May 20	Commonwealth Stadium	Canada	First black act to headline a concert at the venue.
May 23	TCF Bank Stadium	United States	First female act to headline a stadium in Minnesota.
May 27–28	Soldier Field	United States	First black act to headline two consecutive shows on a single tour.
May 31	Heinz Field	United States	First black act to headline a concert at the venue.
June 3	Gillette Stadium	United States	First black soloist to headline a concert at the venue.
June 5 and September 29	Lincoln Financial Field	United States	First black female headliner and first black act to headline two shows on a single tour.
June 7–8	Citi Field	United States	First black and female act to headline one and two shows on a single tour.
June 10	M&T Bank Stadium	United States	First black soloist to headline a concert at the venue.
June 14	Ford Field	United States	First black woman to headline a concert at the venue.
July 9	Croke Park	Ireland	Highest single-day attendance for a female act.
July 12	Esprit Arena	Germany	First black woman to headline a concert at the venue.
July 26	Friends Arena	Sweden	First female act to headline a concert at the venue.
July 31	King Baudouin Stadium	Belgium	First black act to headline a concert at the venue.
September 10	The Dome at America's Center	United States	First female soloist to headline a concert at the venue.
October 2	Nissan Stadium	United States	First female act to headline a concert at the venue.
October 7	MetLife Stadium	United States	First black soloist to headline a concert at the venue.

== Set list ==
This set list is from the Miami show. It is not intended to represent all dates throughout the tour.

"No Angel" (video intro) (contains elements of "Formation")

Act I

1. "Formation"
2. "Sorry" (contains elements of "I'm Sorry")
3. "Bow Down" (contains elements of "Tom Ford")
4. "Run the World (Girls)"

"Superpower" (video interlude) (containing elements of "Made It")

Act II

5. "Mine" (contains elements of "Standing on the Sun Remix")
6. "Baby Boy" (contains elements of "Freaks")
7. "Hold Up" (contains elements of "Bam Bam")
8. "Countdown" (contains elements of "Pop My Trunk")
9. "Me, Myself and I"
10. "Runnin' (Lose It All)"
11. "All Night"

"I Care" (video interlude) (contains elements of "Ghost", "New Slaves", "The Hills" and "6 Inch")

Act III

12. "Don't Hurt Yourself"
13. "Ring the Alarm" (contains elements of "Five to One", "Ring the Alarm (Tenor Saw song)", "Independent Woman Part I", "Lost Yo Mind", "Naughty Girl" and "I Been On")
14. "Diva" (contains elements of "U Mad", "Cut It", "Panda" and "I Got the Keys")
15. "Flawless (Remix)"
16. "Feeling Myself"
17. "Yoncé"
18. "7/11"
19. "Drunk in Love" (contains elements of "Swimming Pools (Drank)")
20. "Rocket"

"Hip Hop Star" / "Freakum Dress" (video interlude)

Act IV

21. "Daddy Lessons"
22. "Single Ladies (Put A Ring On It)"

"Purple Rain" (video interlude with the original recording)

Act V

23. "Crazy in Love" (contains elements of the 2014 Remix and excerpts from "Bootylicious")
24. "Naughty Girl"
25. "Party" (contains elements of "La Di Da Di")
26. "Blow" (contains elements of "Give It to Me Baby" and "Nasty Girl")
27. "Sweet Dreams" (contains elements of "Sweet Dreams (Are Made of This)")

"Die With You" (video interlude) (contains elements of "Blue")

Act VI - Encore

28. "Freedom"
29. "Survivor"
30. "End of Time" (contains elements of "Grown Woman")
31. "Halo"

Notes

- Starting with the show in Tampa, "7/11", "Sweet Dreams" & "Single Ladies (Put A Ring On It)" were dropped from the setlist. "1+1" was added to the set list in place of "Single Ladies".
- During the show in Raleigh, the stadium was evacuated during the middle of "Daddy Lessons" due to nearby lightning sightings and "1+1" was not performed. The show later resumed after almost an hour with "Crazy in Love".
- Starting with the show in Arlington, an acapella version of "Kitty Kat", "Partition", an acapella version of "Love On Top" and a cover of Prince's "The Beautiful Ones" were added to the setlist.
- During the show in Minneapolis, the stadium was evacuated due to nearby lightning strikes. The show was postponed for 45 minutes.
- During the show in Detroit, Beyoncé dedicated "Halo" to those affected by the Orlando nightclub shooting.
- Starting with the show in Cardiff, an acapella version of "Irreplaceable" replaced "Kitty Kat" for all European shows. Additionally, "Blow" was removed from the setlist.
- During the show in Glasgow, Beyoncé dedicated "Freedom" to Alton Sterling, Philando Castile, and other victims of police brutality.
- During the show in Barcelona, Beyoncé performed "Irremplazable", the Spanish version of "Irreplaceable".
- During the show in St. Louis, "Single Ladies (Put a Ring on It)" was performed. During the song's performance, Beyoncé's dance captain, Ashley Everett, got a surprise proposal from her then-boyfriend, John Silver.
- At the beginning of the show in New Orleans, Big Freedia introduced Beyoncé to the stage.
- During the second show in Atlanta, "Dey Know" replaced "I Got the Keys" during the Diva dance break, paying tribute to Shawty Lo who had just passed away 5 days prior to the show.
- During the show in East Rutherford, "6 Inch" was added to the set list and Serena Williams, Jay-Z, and Kendrick Lamar joined Beyoncé on stage for the respective performances of "Sorry", "Drunk in Love" and "Freedom".

== Tour dates ==
List of concerts, showing date, city, country, venue, opening acts, attendance and gross revenue
Date (2016)	City	Country	Venue	Opening acts	Attendance	Revenue
April 27	Miami	United States	Marlins Park	DJ Khaled	36,656 / 36,656	$5,252,615
April 29	Tampa	United States	Raymond James Stadium	DJ Khaled	40,818 / 40,818	$4,803,295
May 1	Atlanta	United States	Georgia Dome	DJ Khaled	46,321 / 46,321	$5,801,725
May 3	Raleigh	United States	Carter–Finley Stadium	DJ Khaled	38,292 / 38,292	$4,810,620
May 7	Houston	United States	NRG Stadium	DJ Khaled	43,871 / 43,871	$6,412,280
May 9	Arlington	United States	AT&T Stadium	DJ Khaled	42,235 / 42,235	$5,954,775
May 12	San Diego	United States	Qualcomm Stadium	DJ Khaled	45,885 / 45,885	$6,028,115
May 14	Pasadena	United States	Rose Bowl	DJ Khaled	55,736 / 55,736	$7,138,685
May 16	Santa Clara	United States	Levi's Stadium	DJ Khaled	44,252 / 44,252	$6,201,845
May 18	Seattle	United States	CenturyLink Field	DJ Khaled	46,529 / 46,529	$5,415,810
May 20	Edmonton	Canada	Commonwealth Stadium	DJ Khaled	39,299 / 39,299	$3,723,830
May 23	Minneapolis	United States	TCF Bank Stadium	DJ Drama	37,203 / 37,203	$4,174,270
May 25	Toronto	Canada	Rogers Centre	DJ Scratch	45,009 / 45,009	$4,440,554
May 27	Chicago	United States	Soldier Field	Rae Sremmurd; Vic Mensa	89,270 / 89,270	$11,279,890
May 28	Chicago	United States	Soldier Field	DJ Scratch	89,270 / 89,270	$11,279,890
May 31	Pittsburgh	United States	Heinz Field	Jermaine Dupri	36,325 / 36,325	$3,927,805
June 3	Foxborough	United States	Gillette Stadium	DJ Khaled	48,304 / 48,304	$6,008,698
June 5	Philadelphia	United States	Lincoln Financial Field	DJ Khaled	47,223 / 47,223	$5,563,435
June 7	New York City	United States	Citi Field	DJ Khaled	73,486 / 73,486	$11,461,340
June 8	New York City	United States	Citi Field	DJ Khaled	73,486 / 73,486	$11,461,340
June 10	Baltimore	United States	M&T Bank Stadium	DJ Khaled	47,819 / 47,819	$5,770,660
June 12	Hershey	United States	Hersheypark Stadium	DJ Khaled	26,662 / 26,662	$3,474,695
June 14 (Note: Originally scheduled to take place on May 29, 2016, the concert was postponed due to scheduling changes.)	Detroit	United States	Ford Field	DJ Khaled	41,524 / 41,524	$5,471,395
June 28	Sunderland	England	Stadium of Light	DJ Magnum	48,952 / 48,952	$4,996,960
June 30	Cardiff	Wales	Principality Stadium	DJ Magnum	49,215 / 49,215	$5,379,199
July 2	London	England	Wembley Stadium	DJ Magnum; Zara Larsson	142,500 / 142,500	$15,301,688
July 3	London	England	Wembley Stadium	DJ Magnum	142,500 / 142,500	$15,301,688
July 5	Manchester	England	Emirates Old Trafford	DJ Magnum	49,935 / 49,935	$5,159,998
July 7	Glasgow	Scotland	Hampden Park	Chloe x Halle; Ingrid	46,058 / 46,058	$4,707,580
July 9	Dublin	Ireland	Croke Park	Chloe x Halle; Ingrid	68,575 / 68,575	$7,449,942
July 12	Düsseldorf	Germany	Esprit Arena	Chloe x Halle; Ingrid	34,481 / 34,481	$3,464,861
July 14	Zürich	Switzerland	Letzigrund	Chloe x Halle; Ingrid	23,790 / 23,790	$2,980,051
July 16	Amsterdam	Netherlands	Amsterdam Arena	Chloe x Halle; Ingrid	49,436 / 49,436	$4,712,051
July 18	Milan	Italy	San Siro	Chloe x Halle; Ingrid; Sophie Beem	54,313 / 54,313	$4,744,732
July 21	Saint-Denis	France	Stade de France	Chloe x Halle; Ingrid	75,106 / 75,106	$6,258,954
July 24	Copenhagen	Denmark	Telia Parken	Chloe x Halle; Ingrid	45,197 / 45,197	$4,626,103
July 26	Stockholm	Sweden	Friends Arena	Chloe x Halle; Ingrid	48,519 / 48,519	$3,937,498
July 29	Frankfurt	Germany	Commerzbank-Arena	Chloe x Halle; Ingrid	36,647 / 36,647	$3,739,440
July 31	Brussels	Belgium	King Baudouin Stadium	Chloe x Halle; Ingrid	48,955 / 48,955	$4,681,095
August 3	Barcelona	Spain	Estadi Olímpic Lluís Companys	Chloe x Halle; Ingrid	45,346 / 45,346	$4,806,995
September 10	St. Louis	United States	The Dome at America's Center	Vic Mensa	38,256 / 38,256	$3,953,445
September 14	Los Angeles	United States	Dodger Stadium	Anderson .Paak	47,440 / 47,440	$6,736,700
September 17	Santa Clara	United States	Levi's Stadium	DJ Drama	44,015 / 44,015	$4,898,690
September 22	Houston	United States	NRG Stadium	DJ Khaled	42,635 / 42,635	$5,107,065
September 24	New Orleans	United States	Mercedes-Benz Superdome	DJ Khaled	46,474 / 46,474	$5,349,960
September 26	Atlanta	United States	Georgia Dome	DJ Khaled	45,126 / 45,126	$5,374,615
September 29	Philadelphia	United States	Lincoln Financial Field	DJ Khaled	44,693 / 44,693	$3,353,627
October 2 (Note: Originally scheduled to take place on May 5, 2016, the concert was rescheduled for unknown reasons.)	Nashville	United States	Nissan Stadium	DJ Khaled	43,013 / 43,013	$5,182,345
October 7 (Note: Originally scheduled to take place on September 7, 2016, the concert was rescheduled due to doctor's order for vocal rest.)	East Rutherford	United States	MetLife Stadium	DJ Khaled	50,703 / 50,703	$6,064,625
Total					2,242,099 / 2,242,099 (100%)	$256,084,556

== Dancers ==
Beyonce had 19 dancers and one aerialist on tour.

- Ashley Everett (dance captain)
- Kimberly "Kimmie Gee" Gipson (dance co-captain)
- Fulani Bahati
- Dnay Baptiste
- Kendra Jae Bracy
- Tasha Bryant
- Hannah Douglass
- Hajiba Fahmy
- Amandy Fernandez
- Jasmine Harper
- Sabina Lundgren
- Saidah Nairobi
- Ferly Prado
- Deijah Robinson
- Ai Shimatsu
- Ebony Williams
- Tajana B. Williams
- Quinetta "Quinny" Wilmington
- Khadijah Wilson
- Darielle Williams (aerialist)

== See also ==
- List of highest-grossing concert tours by women
