= Sophie Beem =

American pop singer-songwriter (born 1999)

- Born: May 4, 1999 (age 26); New York City, U.S.
- Occupations: Singer; songwriter
- Years active: 2016 – present
- Musical career
- Genres: Pop; dance
- Labels: Parkwood Entertainment; Columbia Records

Sophie Beem (born May 4, 1999) is an American singer and songwriter from New York City.

== Career ==
Born and raised in Manhattan's Upper East Side, she released music under Parkwood Entertainment after being signed by Beyoncé to a two-year artist development deal in 2016. Beem auditioned for The X Factor USA in 2012, where she performed for judges Britney Spears, Demi Lovato, Simon Cowell and L.A. Reid.

In March 2016, Beem released her debut self-titled EP, which featured her debut single, "Skyline". The music video for "Skyline" was released on April 1, 2016, and was directed by Shomi Patwary. The EP also features "I Got It", which features a guest verse by Fetty Wap. In 2016, Beem toured with Charlie Puth on the Nine Track Mind Tour, and with Beyoncé, Chloe x Halle and Ingrid on The Formation World Tour. As of 2021, she was a junior at USC Thornton School of Music.

== Discography ==
=== Extended plays ===
Title	Album details
Sophie Beem EP	Released: March 4, 2016; Label: Parkwood Entertainment, Columbia; Formats: Digital download, streaming

=== Singles ===
Title	Year	Album
"Skyline"	2016	Sophie Beem EP
"Girls Will Be Girls"	2016	Sophie Beem EP
"Glow" (featuring RedOne)	2018	Non-album singles
"Stars"	2018	Non-album singles
"Petty"	2020	Non-album singles

== Tours ==
=== Supporting ===
- Charlie Puth - The Nine Track Mind Tour (2016)
- Beyoncé - The Formation World Tour (2016)
