= Ingrid Burley =

Ingrid
- Born: Ingrid Nicole Burley; December 19, 1986 (age 39); Houston, Texas, U.S.
- Other name: IB3
- Occupations: Rapper; singer; songwriter
- Years active: 1997–present
- Musical career
- Genres: Hip hop; R&B
- Label: Columbia
- Website: damningrid.com

Ingrid Burley (born December 19, 1986), known professionally as Ingrid (formerly IB3), is an American singer, rapper and songwriter. Born and raised in Houston, Texas, Burley's mother was close to Tina Knowles and Mathew Knowles, who signed Burley to his record label, Music World, when she was an upcoming rap artist. She began her career at age 11, as part of Trio, which was managed by Knowles.

Burley became notable for her songwriting deal with Sony/ATV Music Publishing, which involved her recording demos for artists such as Beyoncé. In 2013, Burley appeared in the visuals for "Blow" from Beyoncé's self-titled album. Burley also worked on Beyoncé's following album, Lemonade, writing the song "Love Drought", as well as the Jay-Z collaboration "Shining" from DJ Khaled's 2017 album Grateful.

In 2015, Burley announced that she had signed a contract with Beyoncé's record label, Parkwood Entertainment, alongside Chloe x Halle and Sophie Beem. Burley released her debut EP, titled Trill Feels, under the record label on June 17, 2016.

== Discography ==
=== Albums ===
List of studio albums
Title	Album details
Separated At Birth	Released: July 22, 2019; Label: Music World Entertainment; Format: Streaming

=== Extended plays ===
List of studio albums
Title	Album details
Trill Feels	Released: June 17, 2016; Label: Parkwood, Columbia; Format: Digital download

=== Singles ===
List of singles as lead artist, showing year released and album name
Title	Year	Album
"Flex" (featuring Sevyn Streeter)	2016	Trill Feels

=== Songwriting credits ===
Credits are courtesy of Tidal and Apple Music.

Title	Year	Artist	Album
"Love Drought"	2016	Beyoncé	Lemonade
"Shining" (featuring Beyoncé & Jay-Z)	2017	DJ Khaled	Grateful
"Bug a Boo Roll Call" (interlude)	2019	Beyoncé	Homecoming: The Live Album
"Blast!"	2025	Durand Bernarr	Bloom

== Concert tours ==
Supporting

- The Formation World Tour (2016)

== Awards and nominations ==
Year	Ceremony	Award	Result	Ref
2018	ASCAP Rhythm & Soul Awards	Most-Performed R&B/Hip-Hop Songs ("Shining")	Won	
