= Parkwood Entertainment =

American entertainment and management company

- Type: Private
- Industry: Music, Film, Entertainment
- Founded: 2008; 18 years ago
- Founder: Beyoncé
- Headquarters: Los Angeles, California
- Key people: Beyoncé (chairwoman & CEO)
- Products: Visual albums, films, television specials
- Services: Management, video production
- Subsidiaries: Ivy Park; Parkwood Entertainment; Parkwood Topshop Athletic Ltd.; Parkwood Pictures; Parkwood Management; Parkwood Ventures, Inc.; Parkwood Touring, Inc.
- Website: beyonce.com

Parkwood Entertainment is an American management, production, entertainment company and record label founded by American singer and songwriter Beyoncé in 2008. The company began as a production unit for films and videos in 2008. It has offices located in New York City and Los Angeles, complete with recording studios, film editing suites, and a vault/archive. Its involvements include products for music production, motion pictures and television specials related to Beyoncé. Its debut projects were co-executive-produced films Cadillac Records and Obsessed.

== History ==
Parkwood Productions was founded in 2009 as a production unit for videos and films by American singer, actress, producer, and director Beyoncé. The company expanded over the next two years, evolving into the umbrella company Parkwood Entertainment (as it is now known) in 2010. Parkwood is named after a street in Houston, Texas where Beyoncé once lived. Parkwood Entertainment's first production was the musical biopic Cadillac Records (2008), in which Beyoncé starred and co-produced. In 2009, she starred in and executive produced the thriller Obsessed. During a private screening held at New York's School of Visual Arts Theatre following the release of her self-titled fifth studio album, Beyoncé briefly discussed her decision to found Parkwood Entertainment in front of her fans and the press, saying:

"I started my own company when I decided to manage myself. It was important that I didn't go to some big management company, I felt like I wanted to follow the footsteps of Madonna and be a powerhouse and have my own empire, and show other women when you get to this point in your career you don't have to go sign with someone else and share your money and your success—you do it yourself."

In December 2013, Parkwood Entertainment released Beyoncé's fifth self-titled visual album. The surprising release caused "hilarious, honest and hysterical" reaction among Beyoncé's fans, and "shock" among other musicians. According to data provided by Twitter, the release generated over 1.2 million tweets in 12 hours. Peter Robinson of The Guardian hailed the shock release as "Beyoncégeddon", describing it as a "major triumph ... a masterclass in both exerting and relinquishing control." Beyoncé was released digitally to the iTunes Store without prior announcement or promotion. It debuted at number one on the US Billboard 200, earning Beyoncé her fifth consecutive number-one album in the country. The record sold 617,000 copies in the US, and 828,773 copies worldwide in its first three days of availability, becoming the fastest-selling album in the history of the iTunes Store at the time. It was reissued in November 2014 as part of a platinum edition, along with an extended play of new songs. It received acclaim from critics, who praised its production, exploration of sexuality, and Beyoncé's vocals. As of November 2016, Beyoncé has sold 8 million copies worldwide and has spawned the singles "XO", "Drunk in Love", "Partition" and "Pretty Hurts.

In October 2014, Beyoncé with Parkwood Entertainment formed a large collaboration with Topshop, creating the subsidiary Parkwood Topshop Athletic Ltd, to produce an athletic, streetwear brand. The company and collaboration is a 50/50 split, with both parent companies owning half of this new division. Beyoncé commented on the collaboration stating "I could not think of a better partner as I continue to grow the Parkwood business". In November 2018, Parkwood Entertainment confirmed that the company had acquired total ownership of the Ivy Park brand from co-founder Sir Philip Green following allegations of sexual harassment and racial abuse.

In 2015, Parkwood expanded into managing the careers of upcoming artists and signed Chloe x Halle, Sophie Beem, and INGRID.

In 2016, Steve Pamon, from JP Morgan Chase took office as the COO and President of the company. Within that same year, Parkwood Entertainment released Beyoncé's critically acclaimed sixth studio album Lemonade. The album was accompanied by the release of a 60-minute film of the same name, which premiered on HBO on April 23, 2016.

Parkwood Entertainment has been listed twice by Fast Company as one of the Top 10 Most Innovative Companies in Music (2015 and 2017).

== Artists ==
Current artists

- Beyoncé
  - The Carters
- Chloe x Halle
  - Chlöe
  - Halle

Former artists

- Sophie Beem
- INGRID

== Discography ==
Beyoncé

- 4 (2011)
- Beyoncé (2013)
- Lemonade (2016)
- Homecoming: The Live Album (2019)
- The Lion King: The Gift (2019)
- Renaissance (2022)
- Cowboy Carter (2024)
- B'Day: 20th Anniversary Edition (2026)

Chloe x Halle

- Sugar Symphony (2016)
- The Two of Us (2017)
- The Kids Are Alright (2018)
- Ungodly Hour (2020)

The Carters

- Everything Is Love (2018)

Chlöe

- In Pieces (2023)
- Trouble in Paradise (2024)
- Resurrection (with Timbaland) (2026)
- A Chlöe Christmas (2026)

Halle

- Love?... or Something Like It (2025)

Sophie Beem

- Sophie Beem (2016)

INGRID

- Trill Feels (2016)

== Filmography ==
Motion pictures

- Cadillac Records [with Sony Music Film] (2008)
- Obsessed [with Rainforest Films] (2009)
- Black Is King [with Walt Disney Pictures] (2020)
- Renaissance: A Film by Beyoncé (2023)

Television specials and video releases

- I Am... World Tour (2010)
- Beyoncé: Year of 4 (2011)
- Live at Roseland: Elements of 4 (2011)
- Life Is But a Dream (2013)
- Live in Atlantic City (2013)
- Beyoncé: X10 (2014)
- Lemonade (2016)
- The Kids Are Alright Short Film (2018)
- Homecoming: A Film by Beyoncé (2019)
- Beyoncé Presents: Making The Gift (2019)
- Beyoncé Bowl (2024)
