= On the Run II Tour =

2018 concert tour by Beyoncé and Jay-Z

- Tour by the Carters
- Promotional poster
- Location: Europe; North America
- Associated album: Everything Is Love
- Start date: June 6, 2018
- End date: October 4, 2018
- No. of shows: 48
- Attendance: 2.170 million
- Box office: $253.5 million ($328.23 million in 2025 dollars)
Beyoncé tour chronology
| The Formation World Tour (2016) | On the Run II Tour (2018) | Renaissance World Tour (2023) |
Jay-Z tour chronology
| 4:44 Tour (2017) | On the Run II Tour (2018) | Jay-Z 30 Tour (2026) |
The Carters tour chronology
| On the Run Tour (2014) | On the Run II Tour (2018) |

The On the Run II Tour (stylized as OTR II) was the second co-headlining concert tour by American singer-songwriter Beyoncé and rapper Jay-Z, also known as the Carters. The all-stadium world tour began on June 6, 2018, in Cardiff, Wales and concluded on October 4, 2018, in Seattle, United States. It followed 2014's On the Run Tour.

== Commercial performance ==
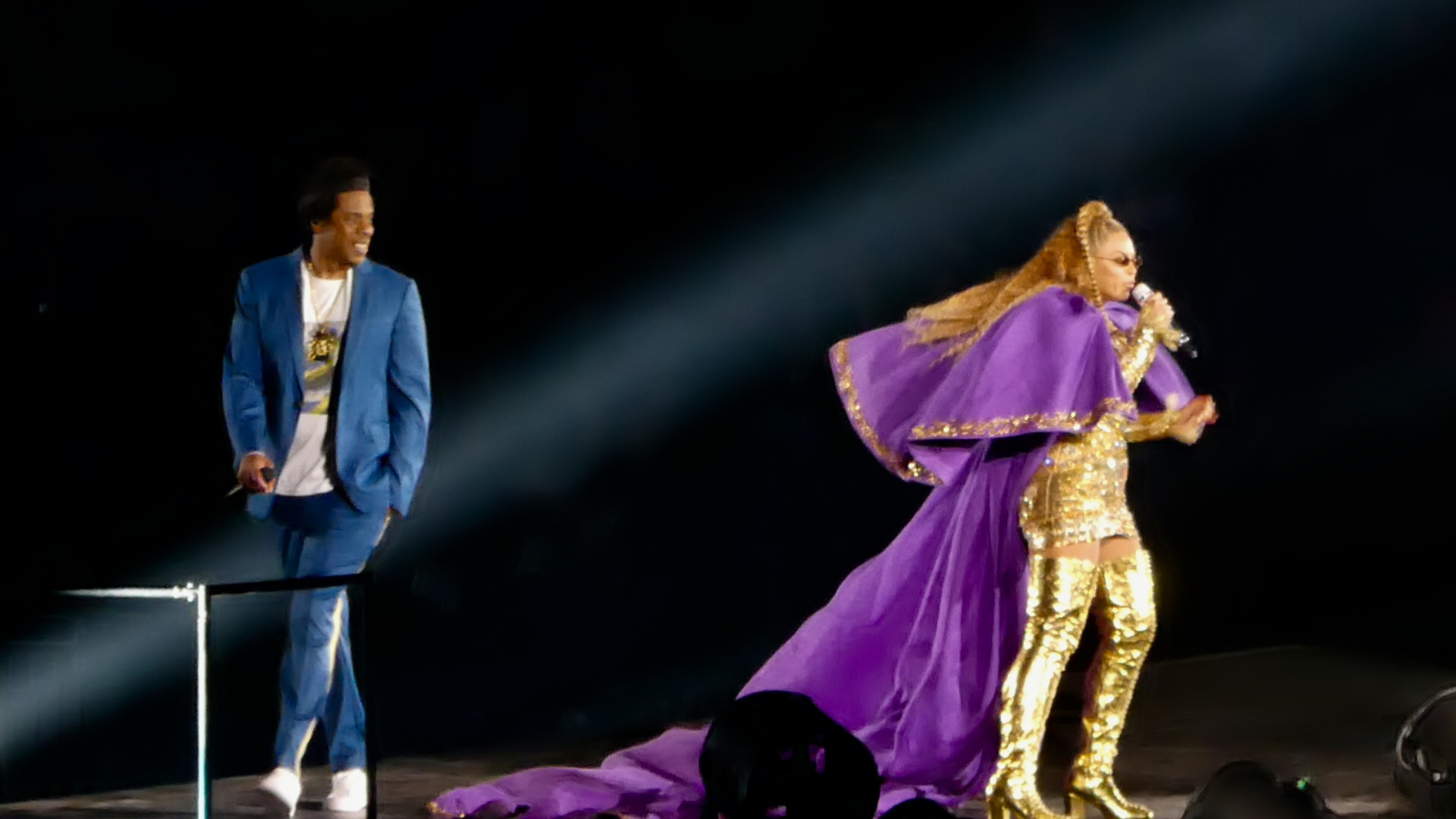
Beyoncé and Jay Z performing on the tour

Billboard predicted that the tour could potentially earn double of the original On the Run Tour's gross, somewhere between $180 million and $200 million, if the success of the first tour were repeated.

Following the first day of general sales, an extra show was added in Amsterdam, after the first date sold-out within an hour, with the same happening in Paris, Maryland, New Jersey, Chicago, Atlanta, Houston, Pasadena and London. More shows were also announced on March 20, in Ohio, South Carolina, Washington, and London.

Billboard ranked On the Run II as the third highest-grossing tour of the year, selling over 2.1 million tickets and grossing over $253 million.

== Critical response ==
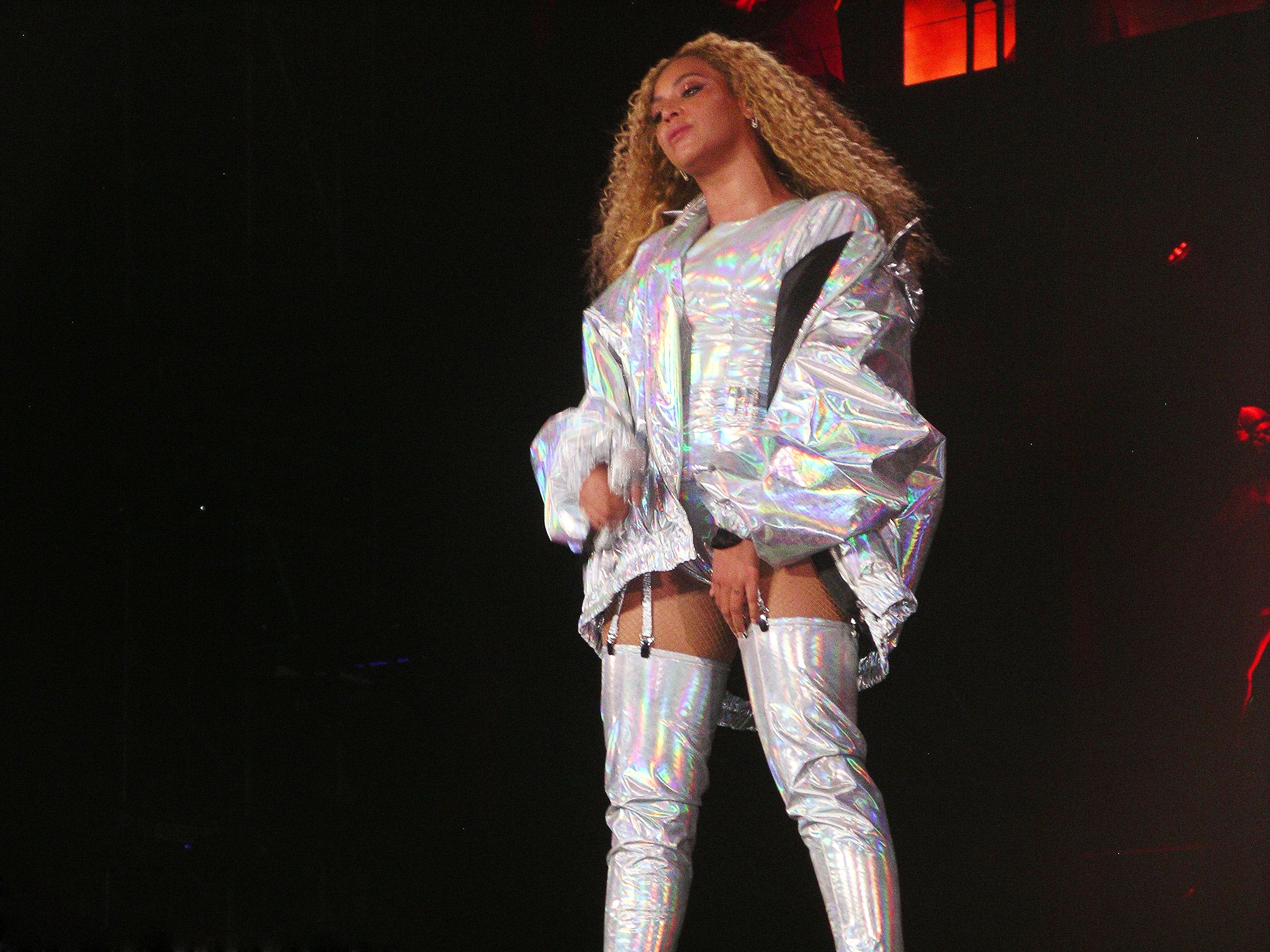
Beyoncé in Rome, Italy

The tour received positive reviews from critics, who praised the overall spectacle and the storyline, which detailed the two artists' love-story, in many aspects.

The tour's debut show in Cardiff received favourable reviews, with Mark Sutherland of Rolling Stone giving it a positive review, saying the concert was a "…reaffirmation of dominance for the pair, as they delivered a hits-packed, visually stunning show". Writing for The Guardian, Rachel Aroesti awarded the concert 4/5 stars, noting that the concept of the show revolved around the singers showcasing the "deathless nature of their love[,] rather than its perfection". Beyoncé was criticized, as some of her "biggest hits" were omitted from the setlist on opening night, such as the powerful ballad "Halo" and the smash hit "Single Ladies (Put a Ring on It)". However, with over 60 songs rehearsed for the tour, the setlist was believed to have changed between shows. Bonginkosi Tshabalala of No Name publications added that the show in Houston proved that "no matter what happens[,] LOVE wins".

Hilary Hughes of Billboard considered the tour a "sum of exceptional parts" of the "mammoth" visuals of Jay-Z 's 4:44 Tour (2017) and the "technical and musical prowess" of Beyoncé's performances at the Coachella Valley Music and Arts Festival (2018) and her Formation World Tour (2016), praising the capacity of the artists "to understand how deeply[-]earned and hard won this catharsis was [is] — and how superhuman they were [are] to channel this anguish into such profound work".

Tom Rasmussen of The Independent defined the show as an "ode" to the couple's love, with "clever use of imagery and song, [used] in a way which showed us why we need to love each other, and what has [can] happened [happen] when we don't". He also noted a sociopolitical element, writing that "In this, the age of political and social disunity, the power of these icons squared is one which transported a whole crowd to another place, another temporality: one filled with power, and joy, and love, and brilliant black talent".

Michael Rietmulder of The Seattle Times said the stage "packed an understated punch", while the video sequences "carried the reconciliatory vibes between movements, interwoven with subtexts of racial inequality and female empowerment."

== Set list ==
=== Europe ===
This set list is representative of the June 6 show in Cardiff, Wales.

1. "Holy Grail"
2. "Part II (On the Run)"
3. "'03 Bonnie & Clyde"
4. "Drunk in Love" (contains elements of "Swag Surfin")
5. "Diva" / "Irreplaceable"
6. "Clique" / "Everybody Mad"
7. "Dirt off Your Shoulder"
8. "On to the Next One"
9. "FuckWithMeYouKnowIGotIt" / "Flawless"
10. "Feeling Myself"
11. "Top Off"
12. "Naughty Girl"
13. "Big Pimpin'"
14. "Run This Town"
15. "Baby Boy" (contains elements of "Mundian To Bach Ke")
16. "You Don't Love Me (No, No, No)"
17. "Bam" / "Hold Up"
18. "Countdown"
19. "Sorry" / "Me, Myself and I"
20. "99 Problems"
21. "Ring the Alarm"
22. "Don't Hurt Yourself"
23. "I Care"
24. "4:44"
25. "No Church in the Wild"
26. "Song Cry"
27. "Resentment"
28. "Family Feud"
29. "Upgrade U"
30. "Niggas in Paris"
31. "Beach Is Better"
32. "Formation"
33. "Run the World (Girls)"
34. "Public Service Announcement"
35. "The Story of O.J."
36. "Déjà Vu"
37. "Show Me What You Got"
38. "Crazy in Love"
39. "Freedom"
40. "U Don't Know"

Encore

41. "Young Forever"
42. "Perfect Duet"

=== North America ===
This set list is representative of the October 4 show in Seattle, Washington.

1. "Holy Grail"
2. "Part II (On the Run)"
3. "'03 Bonnie & Clyde"
4. "Drunk in Love"
5. "Diva"
6. "Clique"
7. "Dirt off Your Shoulder"
8. "On to the Next One"
9. "FuckWithMeYouKnowIGotIt"
10. "Flawless (Remix)"
11. "Feeling Myself"
12. "Naughty Girl"
13. "Big Pimpin'"
14. "Nice"
15. "Run This Town"
16. "Baby Boy"
17. "Mi Gente (Remix)" / "Mine"
18. "Black Effect"
19. "Countdown"
20. "Sorry"
21. "99 Problems"
22. "Ring the Alarm"
23. "Don't Hurt Yourself"
24. "I Care"
25. "4:44"
26. "Song Cry"
27. "Resentment"
28. "Family Feud"
29. "Upgrade U"
30. "Niggas in Paris"
31. "Beach Is Better"
32. "Formation"
33. "Run the World (Girls)"
34. "Public Service Announcement"
35. "The Story of O.J."
36. "Déjà Vu"
37. "Show Me What You Got"
38. "Crazy in Love"
39. "Freedom"
40. "U Don't Know"

Encore

41. "Young Forever"
42. "Perfect Duet"
43. "Apeshit"

=== Notes ===
- During the shows in Cardiff and Glasgow, "Top Off" and "No Church in the Wild" were both performed for the first time.
- Starting with the show in Manchester, "Top Off" and "No Church in the Wild" were removed from the setlist. Additionally, "Mi Gente (Remix)" and "Mine" were added to the setlist.
- Starting with the show in Copenhagen, "Me, Myself and I" was removed from the setlist.
- Starting with the show in Stockholm, "You Don't Love Me (No, No, No)" was removed from the setlist.
- During the second show in Paris, The Carters performed "Apeshit", which was later added to the setlist starting from the Cleveland show.
- Starting with the show in Philadelphia, "Bam" and "Hold Up" were removed from the setlist and replaced with "Black Effect".
- Starting with the second show in East Rutherford, "Nice" was added to the setlist.
- During the second show in Chicago and the show in Detroit, The Carters performed "Summer".

== Tour dates ==
List of concerts, showing date, city, country, venue, opening acts, attendance and revenue
| Date (2018) | City | Country | Venue | Opening acts | Attendance | Revenue |
|---|---|---|---|---|---|---|
| June 6 | Cardiff | Wales | Principality Stadium | DJ Tom Clugston | 39,731 / 39,731 | $4,186,450 |
| June 9 | Glasgow | Scotland | Hampden Park | Nasty P | 37,963 / 37,963 | $4,132,251 |
| June 13 | Manchester | England | Etihad Stadium | DJ Stylus | 46,990 / 46,990 | $5,782,025 |
| June 15 | London | England | London Stadium | N/A | 126,443 / 126,443 | $11,035,860 |
| June 16 | London | England | London Stadium | N/A | 126,443 / 126,443 | $11,035,860 |
| June 19 | Amsterdam | Netherlands | Amsterdam Arena | DeeJay Abstract | 97,869 / 97,869 | $9,753,269 |
| June 20 | Amsterdam | Netherlands | Amsterdam Arena | DJ Flava | 97,869 / 97,869 | $9,753,269 |
| June 23 | Copenhagen | Denmark | Telia Parken | N/A | 45,356 / 45,356 | $5,741,911 |
| June 25 | Stockholm | Sweden | Friends Arena | N/A | 46,647 / 46,647 | $4,610,554 |
| June 28 | Berlin | Germany | Olympiastadion | N/A | 57,155 / 57,155 | $5,697,111 |
| June 30 | Warsaw | Poland | PGE Narodowy | DJ Eprom | 53,500 / 53,500 | $4,624,995 |
| July 3 | Cologne | Germany | RheinEnergieStadion | DJ Teddy-O | 39,501 / 39,501 | $4,520,814 |
| July 6 | Milan | Italy | San Siro | N/A | 49,051 / 49,051 | $4,460,552 |
| July 8 | Rome | Italy | Stadio Olimpico | N/A | 40,440 / 40,440 | $3,475,543 |
| July 11 | Barcelona | Spain | Estadi Olímpic Lluís Companys | N/A | 46,982 / 46,982 | $4,733,549 |
| July 14 | Saint-Denis (Note: Labelled as Paris in promotional material.) | France | Stade de France | N/A | 111,615 / 111,615 | $10,905,089 |
| July 15 | Saint-Denis | France | Stade de France | N/A | 111,615 / 111,615 | $10,905,089 |
| July 17 | Nice | France | Allianz Riviera | DJ Bens | 33,662 / 33,662 | $3,898,900 |
| July 25 | Cleveland | United States | FirstEnergy Stadium | Chloe x Halle; DJ Khaled | 38,931 / 38,931 | $4,194,376 |
| July 27 | Landover (Note: Labelled as Washington, D.C. in promotional material.) | United States | FedExField | Chloe x Halle; DJ Khaled | 81,964 / 81,964 | $11,437,578 |
| July 28 | Landover | United States | FedExField | Chloe x Halle; DJ Khaled | 81,964 / 81,964 | $11,437,578 |
| July 30 | Philadelphia | United States | Lincoln Financial Field | Chloe x Halle; DJ Khaled | 54,870 / 54,870 | $6,709,691 |
| August 2 | East Rutherford (Note: Labelled as New York in promotional material.) | United States | MetLife Stadium | Chloe x Halle; DJ Khaled | 99,755 / 99,755 | $13,886,416 |
| August 3 | East Rutherford | United States | MetLife Stadium | Chloe x Halle; DJ Khaled | 99,755 / 99,755 | $13,886,416 |
| August 5 | Foxborough (Note: Labelled as Boston in promotional material.) | United States | Gillette Stadium | Chloe x Halle; DJ Khaled | 47,667 / 47,667 | $6,159,980 |
| August 8 | Minneapolis | United States | U.S. Bank Stadium | Chloe x Halle; DJ Khaled | 32,851 / 32,851 | $3,627,417 |
| August 10 | Chicago | United States | Soldier Field | Chloe x Halle; DJ Khaled | 86,602 / 86,602 | $12,303,099 |
| August 11 | Chicago | United States | Soldier Field | Chloe x Halle; DJ Khaled | 86,602 / 86,602 | $12,303,099 |
| August 13 | Detroit | United States | Ford Field | Chloe x Halle; DJ Khaled | 43,699 / 43,699 | $5,310,376 |
| August 16 | Columbus | United States | Ohio Stadium | Chloe x Halle; DJ Khaled | 35,083 / 35,083 | $3,142,160 |
| August 18 | Orchard Park (Note: Labelled as Buffalo in promotional material.) | United States | New Era Field | Chloe x Halle; DJ Khaled | 38,053 / 38,053 | $4,262,076 |
| August 21 | Columbia | United States | Williams–Brice Stadium | Chloe x Halle; DJ Khaled | 38,057 / 38,057 | $3,920,226 |
| August 23 | Nashville | United States | Vanderbilt Stadium | Chloe x Halle; DJ Khaled | 35,353 / 35,353 | $4,058,910 |
| August 25 | Atlanta | United States | Mercedes-Benz Stadium | Chloe x Halle; DJ Khaled | 105,170 / 105,170 | $14,074,692 |
| August 26 | Atlanta | United States | Mercedes-Benz Stadium | Chloe x Halle; DJ Khaled | 105,170 / 105,170 | $14,074,692 |
| August 29 | Orlando | United States | Camping World Stadium | Chloe x Halle; DJ Khaled | 39,423 / 39,423 | $4,749,202 |
| August 31 | Miami Gardens (Note: Labelled as Miami in promotional material.) | United States | Hard Rock Stadium | Chloe x Halle; DJ Khaled | 44,310 / 44,310 | $6,295,535 |
| September 11 | Arlington (Note: Labelled as Dallas in promotional material.) | United States | AT&T Stadium | Chloe x Halle; DJ Khaled | 41,626 / 41,626 | $5,713,125 |
| September 13 | New Orleans | United States | Mercedes-Benz Superdome | Chloe x Halle; DJ Khaled | 40,939 / 40,939 | $5,437,147 |
| September 15 | Houston | United States | NRG Stadium | Chloe x Halle; DJ Khaled | 87,936 / 87,936 | $11,056,837 |
| September 16 | Houston | United States | NRG Stadium | Chloe x Halle; DJ Khaled | 87,936 / 87,936 | $11,056,837 |
| September 19 | Glendale (Note: Labelled as Phoenix in promotional material.) | United States | State Farm Stadium | Chloe x Halle; DJ Khaled | 37,174 / 37,174 | $4,426,568 |
| September 22 | Pasadena (Note: Labelled as Los Angeles in promotional material.) | United States | Rose Bowl | Chloe x Halle; DJ Khaled | 106,550 / 106,550 | $13,464,062 |
| September 23 | Pasadena | United States | Rose Bowl | Chloe x Halle; DJ Khaled | 106,550 / 106,550 | $13,464,062 |
| September 27 | San Diego | United States | SDCCU Stadium | Chloe x Halle; DJ Khaled | 42,953 / 42,953 | $5,445,486 |
| September 29 | Santa Clara (Note: Labelled as San Francisco in promotional material.) | United States | Levi's Stadium | Chloe x Halle; DJ Khaled | 47,235 / 47,235 | $7,548,208 |
| October 2 | Vancouver | Canada | BC Place | Chloe x Halle; DJ Khaled | 39,032 / 39,032 | $4,366,828 |
| October 4 | Seattle | United States | CenturyLink Field | Chloe x Halle; DJ Khaled | 40,718 / 40,718 | $4,888,994 |
| Total | | | | | 2,178,766 / 2,178,766 (100%) | $254,037,862 |

== Personnel ==
=== Creative direction and executive producers ===
- Jay-Z and Beyoncé – creative director and executive producer
- Ed Burke – creative director
- Todd Tourso – additional creative direction
- Erin Williams – executive producer
- Mark A. Ritchie – live video director

=== Musical arrangement ===
- JAY-Z
- Beyoncé
- Derek Dixie
- Omar Edwards
- Chris Grant
- Gimel Keaton
- Stuart White

=== Band ===
- Lauren Taniel – bass
- Dammo Farmer The Great – bass
- Agape Woodlyn – guitars
- Eric "Boots/Booty" Greene – drums, percussion
- Joy Williams – drums, percussion
- Quintin Gulledge – keyboards
- DJ Guru – DJ
- 1500 or Nothin'
- Crystal Torres – trumpet
- Chris (T-Bone Chris) Johnson – trombone
- Lessie Vonner – trumpet
- Mike Jones – sousaphone
- Corbin Jones – sousaphone
- Chris Grey – trumpet

=== Background vocalists ===
- Tiffany Moníque Ryan – lead background vocalist
- Ashley D. Hobson
- Whitney Howard
- Jerome "J Rome" Wayne

=== Choreography ===
- Chris Grant
- JaQuel Knight
- Vincent Stevenson

=== Additional choreography ===
- Dana Foglia
- Sidi Larbi Cherkaoui
- Jasmine Badie
- Frank Gatson Jr.
- Jamal Rasheed
- Ashanti Ledon
- Dnay Baptiste
- Sheryl Murakami
- Les Twins
- Tanisha Scott
- LaVelle Smith

=== Dancers ===
- Ashley Everett – dance captain
- Kimberly "Kimmie" Gipson – dance captain
- Jasmine Badie
- Dnay Baptiste
- Bianca Brewton
- Hannah Douglass
- Jasmine Harper
- Corbin Hunter
- Dominique Loude
- Tacir Roberson
- Deijah Robinson
- Ashley Seldon
- Quinetta Wilmington
- Rameer Colon
- Habby Jacques
- Huwer "Havoc" Marche
- Jo'Artis "Big Mijo" Ratti
- Britton Shaw
- Nicholas "Slick" Stewart

== Notes ==
Cities
