= Art Dixie =

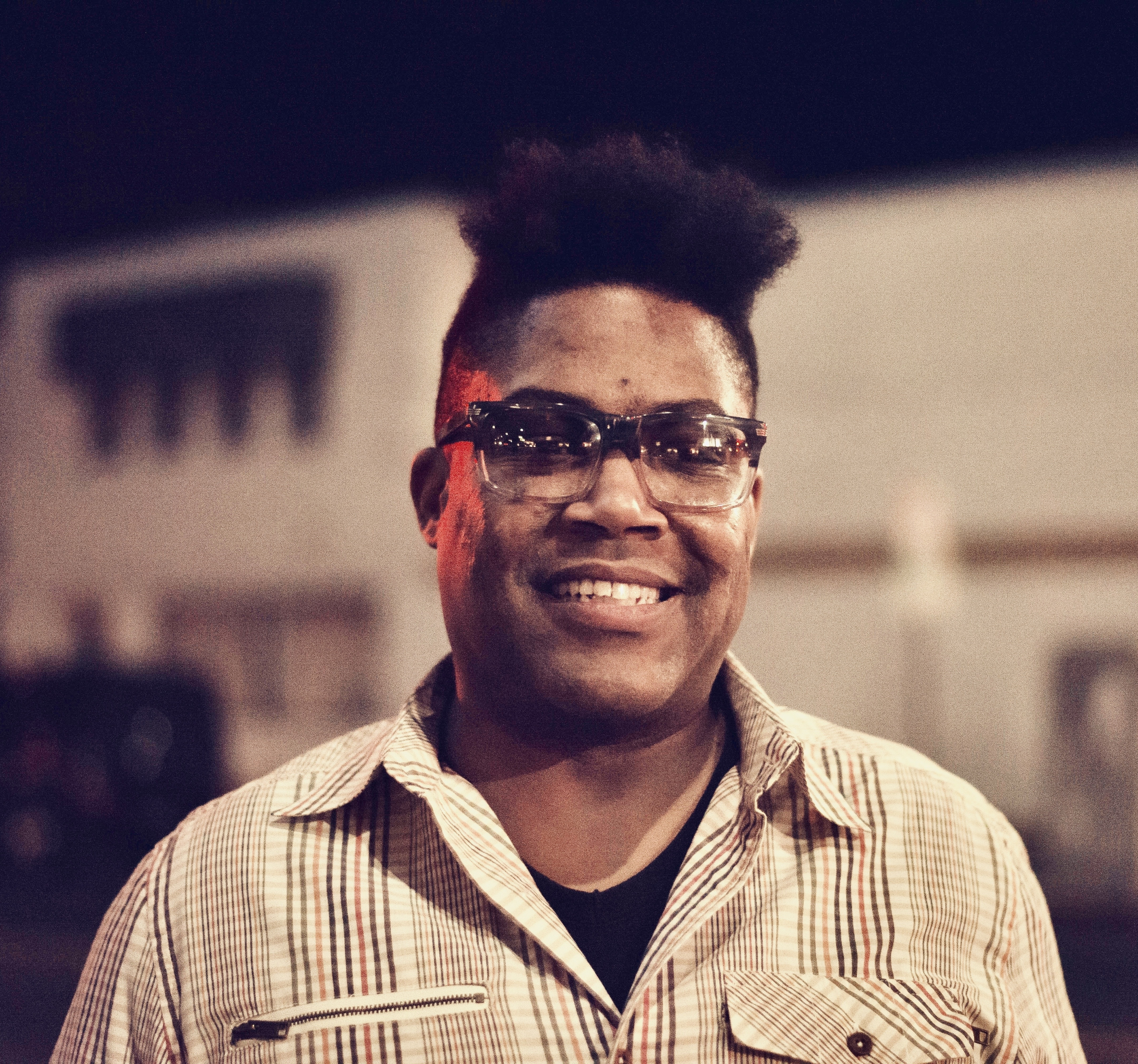
- Art Dixie

Background information
- Born: Youngstown, Ohio, U.S.
- Genres: Contemporary jazz, gospel, R&B
- Occupations: Music producer, songwriter, arranger, keyboardist, entrepreneur
- Years active: 1993–present

Art Dixie (also credited as Art "Mr. Freddyman" Dixie) is an American music producer, songwriter, arranger, and keyboardist originally from Youngstown, Ohio. He began his career in 1993 collaborating with producer Mario Winans on the contemporary Christian group Anointed's album Spiritual Love Affair (Word/Epic/Sony). He subsequently worked extensively with NBA player and jazz bassist Wayman Tisdale as a producer, songwriter, and multi-instrumentalist on Tisdale's albums for Motown Records' MoJazz imprint, including Power Forward (1995) and In the Zone (1996). Dixie is the founder of Hot Trax Inc., a creative services company specializing in music production and sound design.

== Early life and career ==
Dixie began his musical training in Youngstown, Ohio. In 1993, at age 18, he collaborated with producer Mario Winans on Anointed's album Spiritual Love Affair, released on Word/Epic (Sony distribution). He is credited with performing keyboards on the track "Dreams." This early work led to a professional introduction to Wayman Tisdale, who was then playing for the NBA's Sacramento Kings.

== Work with Wayman Tisdale (1993–2000) ==
From 1993 to 2000, Dixie served as a producer, arranger, and session musician for Wayman Tisdale's Tisway Productions. During this tenure, he contributed to multiple albums released on Motown Records' MoJazz imprint.

=== Power Forward (1995) ===
On Power Forward, which peaked at No. 4 on the Billboard Jazz Albums chart, Dixie performed on Hammond B-3 organ, vocoder, and keyboards, while also handling programming and arrangement. He co-wrote the track "After The Game" with Tisdale. The album featured notable collaborators including Kenny Garrett, Marcus Miller, and Brian McKnight.

In 2023, the track "After The Game" was covered by Back 2 Basics (saxophonist Eddie M and drummer John Paris), with publications like Bass Magazine citing Dixie's original co-writing and production contributions.

=== In the Zone (1996) ===
Dixie served as a producer, arranger, and multi-instrumentalist on In the Zone (1996), which reached No. 7 on the Billboard Contemporary Jazz Albums chart. He is credited as a producer and with keyboards, organ, and arrangements across several tracks.

== Later career and business ventures ==
=== Additional recording work ===
In 1998, Dixie co-wrote and performed keyboards on "Lucky Girl" from saxophonist Marion Meadows' album Pleasure (Discovery Records), working alongside music director Michael Bearden. In 2022, he produced singer Hailey Loggins' single "Temporary Pleasure", mastered by Mike Bozzi at Bernie Grundman Mastering.

=== Film, television, and Hot Trax Inc. ===
Dixie founded Hot Trax Inc. (HTI), a creative services firm specializing in music production and audio engineering. Through HTI, he provided production support for Chloe x Halle's 2018 televised performances, including the MTV Movie & TV Awards.

His film credits include sound design for the short film Last Meal (2017), written by Jenny Klein, and the score for Made Public (2019), which screened at over 40 film festivals and won multiple awards on the international circuit.

== Personal life ==
Dixie is the brother of music director and producer Derek Dixie.

== Selected discography ==
- Anointed – Spiritual Love Affair (1993) – Keyboards
- Wayman Tisdale – Power Forward (1995) – Producer, songwriter, keyboards, programming
- Wayman Tisdale – In the Zone (1996) – Producer, keyboards, organ, arrangements
- Marion Meadows – Pleasure (1998) – Co-writer, keyboards ("Lucky Girl")
- Hailey Loggins – "Temporary Pleasure" (2022) – Producer
