= Apeshit =

Song by The Carters

Single by The Carters

from the album Everything Is Love
- Released: June 16, 2018
- Recorded: 2017–2018
- Genre: Trap
- Length: 4:24
- Label: Roc Nation; Parkwood
- Songwriters: Pharrell Williams; Beyoncé Knowles-Carter; Shawn Carter; Quavious Keyate Marshall; Kiari Kendrell Cephus
- Producer: Pharrell Williams

Beyoncé singles chronology
"Top Off" (2018)	"Apeshit" (2018)	"Spirit" (2019)

Jay-Z singles chronology
"Top Off" (2018)	"Apeshit" (2018)	"Entrepreneur" (2020)

The Carters singles chronology
"Apeshit" (2018)

Music video
- "Apeshit" on YouTube

"Apeshit" (stylized in all caps) is a song by American musical duo The Carters, composed of Beyoncé and Jay-Z. The song was written by the duo, Pharrell Williams, and Quavo & Offset from the hip hop trio Migos, with the former three producing the song alongside Stuart White and the latter two providing ad-libs on the song. The song was released on June 16, 2018, as the only single from the duo's collaborative studio album Everything Is Love, along with a music video filmed at the Louvre in Paris. The video received eight nominations at the 2018 MTV Video Music Awards, including for Video of the Year, and a nomination for Best Music Video at the 61st Grammy Awards.

== Critical reception ==
Otis Hart of NPR dubbed the song one of the catchiest to be released in 2018, adding that it "lives up to the grandeur on first listen". Kory Grow writing for the Rolling Stone described the beat as "hard-hitting". Simon Reynolds cited "Apeshit" as an example for the continuing "triumph" of Auto-Tune in contemporary music, with Beyoncé "jump[ing] on the trap bandwagon [in] a transparent attempt to compete on urban radio by adopting the prevailing template of commercial-yet-street rap".

In December 2018, Billboard ranked "Apeshit" as the 27th best song of the year. For Pitchfork, it was the 85th, while Rolling Stone named the song as the 24th best one of 2018, writing: "Rumors swirled for years that one day the biggest music power couple of all time would release a collaborative album together. [...] The video was as over-the-top and luxurious as one would hope, taking over the Louvre and filling it with a sea of black and brown dancers and models amongst the world’s most iconic art pieces." The Guardian listed "Apeshit" at number 21 on their year end ranking, while Q at number 19, and The Village Voice at number 14.

== Impact ==
The Louvre said there was a more than 50% increase in under-30 visitors in 2018 thanks to the video shot by the couple in the museum, marking a record number of visitors with over 10 million. The museum has created a guided tour centered around the works of art seen in the "Apeshit" video.

== Awards and nominations ==
Year	Ceremony	Nomination	Result
2018	BET Hip Hop Awards		
2018	BET Hip Hop Awards	Song of the Year	Won
2018	BET Hip Hop Awards	Best Collaboration	Won
2018	Clio Awards	Best Music Video	Won
2018	Camerimage Awards	Best Music Video	Nominated
2018	Camerimage Awards	Best Cinematography in a Music Video	Nominated
2018	iHeartRadio MMVAs	Fan Fave Video	Nominated
2018	iHeartRadio MMVAs	Best Direction	Nominated
2018	Los 40 Music Awards	International Video of the Year	Nominated
2018	MTV Europe Music Awards	Best Video	Nominated
2018	MTV Video Music Awards	Video of the Year	Nominated
2018	MTV Video Music Awards	Best Collaboration	Nominated
2018	MTV Video Music Awards	Best Hip-Hop Video	Nominated
2018	MTV Video Music Awards	Best Art Direction	Won
2018	MTV Video Music Awards	Best Choreography	Nominated
2018	MTV Video Music Awards	Best Cinematography	Won
2018	MTV Video Music Awards	Best Direction	Nominated
2018	MTV Video Music Awards	Best Editing	Nominated
2018	Soul Train Music Awards	Rhythm & Bars Award	Nominated
2018	UK Music Video Awards	Best International Urban Video	Nominated
2019	AICP Post Awards	Best Color Grading: Music Video	Won
2019	Grammy Awards	Best Music Video	Nominated
2019	NAACP Image Awards	Outstanding Music Video/Visual Album	Nominated

== Music video ==
The music video for the song was directed by Ricky Saiz, produced by Iconoclast, and filmed in the Louvre in Paris and Los Angeles, California in May 2018. The video premiered on the second night of the London show during their On the Run II Tour at the London Stadium. The clip lasts for six minutes. It opens with a man who has wings, seen crouching as bells and sirens are prominent in the background, and features visual imagery suggesting comparisons and linkages between wealth, status, and royalty in the Renaissance-era artwork and the eventual evolution of these characteristics into the Carters. The visual narrative moves on to reveal the empty halls at the Louvre and the pair posing in front of Leonardo da Vinci's masterpiece the Mona Lisa. Once the song starts playing, the scene cuts to the duo poised atop a marble staircase while dancers lay across the descending steps contracting and releasing their torsos to the rhythmic flow of the song. Statues and paintings such as Winged Victory of Samothrace, Venus de Milo, and The Coronation of Napoleon are featured throughout the video as the duo lip-sync the lyrics to the track.

The cost of the music video is unconfirmed, but details regarding renting out the Louvre for private events can be found on their website. Otis Hart of NPR called the video "extravagantly produced six minutes, filled with high art, pastel suits and turnt up museum parties". Kory Grow writing for Rolling Stone deemed the clip "stunning" and noticed how the duo looked "serene" in it resembling "works of arts themselves". Later in the year, Rolling Stone declared the video the best one of 2018, and would later name it the 29th greatest music video of all time. Slant Magazine named "Apeshit" the 17th greatest music video of all time.

The music video received 8 nominations at the 2018 MTV Video Music Awards, in categories Video of the Year, Best Collaboration, Best Hip-Hop Video, Best Cinematography, Best Direction, Best Art Direction, Best Choreography and Best Editing, winning Best Cinematography and Best Art Direction. The music video was nominated for Best Music Video at the 61st Grammy Awards.

== Personnel ==
Credits adapted from Tidal.

- Pharrell Williams – production
- Beyoncé – co-production
- Jay-Z – co-production
- Stuart White – additional production, mixing, recording
- Offset – additional vocals
- Quavo – additional vocals
- Young Guru – recording
- Mike Larson – recording
- DJ Durel – recording
- Dan Ewins – mix engineering assistance
- Adrien Crapanzano – engineering assistance
- Colin Leonard – mastering

== Charts ==
=== Weekly charts ===
Chart (2018)	Peak position
Australia (ARIA)	51
Belgium (Ultratop 50 Flanders)	37
Belgium (Ultratip Bubbling Under Wallonia)	28
Canada (Canadian Hot 100)	24
Czech Republic Singles Digital (ČNS IFPI)	68
France (SNEP)	97
Greece (Billboard)	1
Hungary (Single Top 40)	17
Ireland (IRMA)	33
Italy (FIMI)	93
Netherlands (Single Top 100)	59
New Zealand Heatseekers (RMNZ)	4
Portugal (AFP)	39
Scottish Singles Sales (Official Charts)	43
Slovakia Singles Digital (ČNS IFPI)	33
Sweden (Sverigetopplistan)	56
Switzerland (Schweizer Hitparade)	69
UK Singles (Official Charts)	33
UK Hip Hop/R&B (Official Charts)	21
US Billboard Hot 100	13
US Hot R&B/Hip-Hop Songs (Billboard)	9
US Rhythmic (Billboard)	9

=== Year-end charts ===
Chart (2018)	Position
US Hot R&B/Hip-Hop Songs (Billboard)	53

== Certifications ==
Region	Certification	Certified units/sales
Canada (Music Canada)	Platinum	80,000^{‡}
France (SNEP)	Gold	100,000^{‡}
New Zealand (RMNZ)	Gold	15,000^{‡}
Poland (ZPAV)	Gold	10,000^{‡}
United Kingdom (BPI)	Gold	400,000^{‡}
United States (RIAA)	Platinum	1,000,000^{‡}
^{‡} Sales+streaming figures based on certification alone.
