= Boss (The Carters song) =

Song by The Carters

from the album Everything Is Love
- Released: June 16, 2018
- Recorded: 2017–2018
- Studio: U Arena (Paris)
- Genre: R&B; hip-hop
- Length: 4:04
- Label: Parkwood; Roc Nation
- Songwriters: Beyoncé; Shawn Carter; Tyrone Griffin Jr.; Dernst Emile II
- Producers: The Carters; Derek Dixie; D'Mile; Stuart White; MeLo-X; Mike Dean

"Boss" is a song recorded by American musical duo The Carters for their debut album Everything Is Love. Recognized by Bustle as "honor[ing] the hard work the couple have put in to everything they touch, ... extend[ing] to raising a family", the song was certified Gold in 2021 by the RIAA for sale of over 500,000 units.

== Background and composition ==
“Boss” was written by Knowles, Shawn Carter, Tyrone Griffin Jr., and Dernst Emile II, and produced by The Carters, Derek Dixie, D'Mile, Stuart White, MeLo-X, and Mike Dean. Ty Dolla Sign also contributes backing vocals. In his verse, Jay-Z raps about someone who is “not a boss", allegedly referring to Canadian rapper Drake, who reportedly declined a contract with streaming service Tidal to later accept a $19 million contract with Apple. On Beyonce's rapped verse, she discusses the building of intergenerational wealth in Black communities, addressing her method of building a legacy and portfolio for their descendants. In thinking of how children down the line will benefit from her inheritance, she mentions that “My great-great-grandchildren already rich/That's a lot of brown chil’ren on your Forbes list...”

The Independent highlighted the "big brass [outro] (recorded in the team locker rooms at U Arena in Paris) that recall[ed] Beyoncé's mind-boggling show at Coachella; paying tribute to the traditional high school marching band." The track closes with their daughter Blue Ivy Carter offering a message to her younger twin siblings: “Shout out to Rumi and Sir, love, Blue.”

== Reception ==
In their respective reviews of the parent album, both Pitchfork and The Guardian highlighted Beyonce's line on the song "My great-great-grandchildren already rich/That’s a lot of brown chil’run on your Forbes list”— as "the best of many flexes on the album." Bustle celebrated the inclusion of their daughter Blue Ivy Carter, before describing the song as a "masterpiece", as well as "an empowering anthem that honors the fact that the Knowles-Carters — or, for the sake of this album, the Carters — are legit bosses, in every sense of the word."

== Personnel ==
- Beyoncé Giselle Knowles-Carter – lead & background vocals, production, vocal production
- Shawn Carter – lead & background vocals, production
- D'Mile – production
- Derek Dixie – additional production
- Mike Dean – additional production
- MeLo-X – additional production
- Stuart White – additional production
- Blue Ivy Carter – additional vocals
- Ty Dolla Sign – additional vocals
- Derek Dixie – horn arrangement
- Corbin Jones – horns
- Christopher Gray – horns
- Christopher Johnson – horns
- Crystal Torres – horns
- Arnetta Johnson – horns
- Lessie Vonner – horns
- Peter Ortega – horns
- Randy Ellis – horns
- Richard Lucchese – horns
- Gimel Keaton – recording engineer
- Tony Maserati – mixing engineer
- Adrien Crapanzano – assistant engineer
- Colin Leonard – mastering engineer

== Charts ==
Weekly chart performance for "Boss"
Chart (2018)	Peak position
UK Singles Chart (OCC)	87
US Hot 100 (Billboard)	77
US Hot R&B/Hip-Hop Songs (Billboard)	38

== Certifications ==
Region	Certification	Certified units/sales
United States (RIAA)	Gold	500,000^{‡}
^{‡} Sales+streaming figures based on certification alone.
