= Young Guru =

American audio engineer (born 1974)

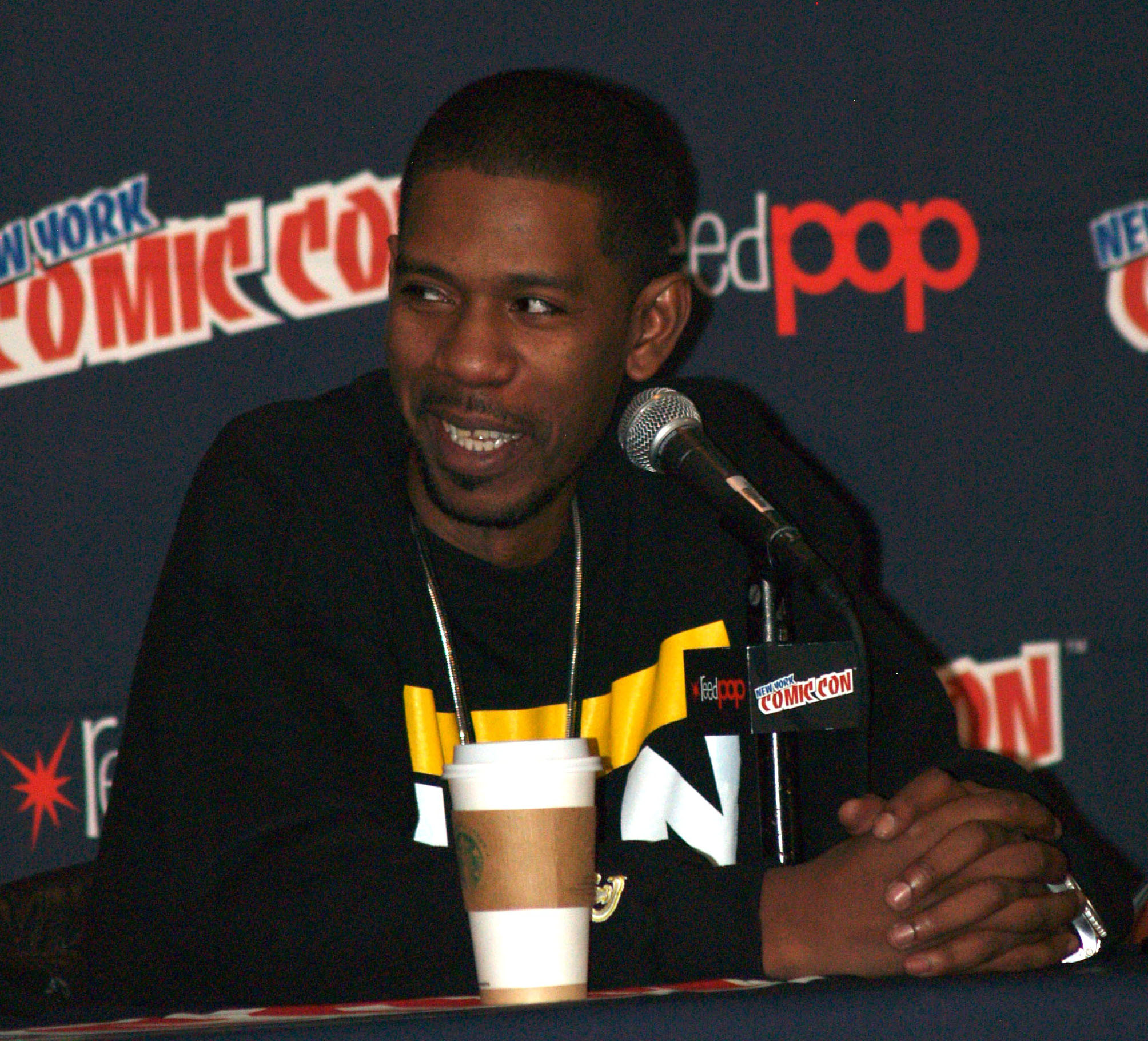
- Young Guru at New York Comic Con, October 2014

Background information
- Born: Gimel Androus Keaton; February 27, 1974 (age 51); Wilmington, Delaware, U.S.
- Genres: Hip hop
- Occupations: Audio engineer; record producer; disc jockey; record executive
- Years active: 1996–present
- Labels: Roc-A-Fella; Roc Nation; Def Jam; Jamla Records; It's a Wonderful World Music Group

Gimel Androus Keaton (born February 27, 1974), professionally better known by his pseudonym Young Guru, is an American audio engineer, record producer, disc jockey, and record executive from Wilmington, Delaware. In 2019, Young Guru won a Grammy Award for Best Urban Contemporary Album for recording the album Everything Is Love by The Carters. He has worked with many leading recording artists, most notably Jay-Z and Kanye West, and an April 2015 The Wall Street Journal profile called him "the most famous and successful engineer in the history of hip-hop".

== Career ==
Young Guru acquired his moniker as a teen when he taught African history classes at a community center. He also used his name when he began working as a DJ while still a teenager. In the early 1990s Young Guru bought his own amplifiers, lights and microphones which sparked his interest in music technology. While a student at Howard University, he saw the early development of Bad Boy Records and landed some of his early engineering jobs. He began DJing in Washington, D.C. in 1996, where he met singer/rapper Nonchalant, who had a top 20 single at the time, and became her tour DJ. Young Guru, who had taken piano lessons as a child, used the money he received from the tour to fund a six-month music recording course at Omega Recording Studios in Rockville, Maryland, which had a great impact on him. After Omega, Young Guru engineered Nonchalant's second album, which was never released, but the producer, Chucky Thompson (Mary J. Blige, Faith Evans) recognized the young engineer's potential and invited him to come and work with him in Washington, D.C. In 1999, Young Guru went independent and moved to New York, where he worked with Deric "D-Dot" Angelettie on his Madd Rapper project and with Memphis Bleek. The latter was signed to Roc-A-Fella Records, which led to Young Guru meeting Jay-Z.

Over the years Young Guru has been a major part of several artists' careers in addition to Jay-Z, including Beyoncé, Rihanna, Ludacris, Ghostface Killah, Freeway, Cam'ron, Redman & Method Man, Mariah Carey, Pete Rock, Fabolous, Talib Kweli, Bone Thugs-N-Harmony and T.I.

He was the tour DJ for the 'Watch The Throne' world tour featuring Jay-Z and Kanye West, and also for JAY-Z's '4:44' Tour

In August 2013, Young Guru taught an audio mixing class via Skillshare. The video lessons, filmed at SAE Institute New York, were titled "Sound Check: The Essentials of DIY Audio Mixing".

In April 2015, Young Guru was named the Director of Operations at 9th Wonder's record label It's a Wonderful World Music Group.

Young Guru has also lent instruments to the youth-oriented digital audio workstation, EarSketch.

In November 2018, Young Guru was credited with mixing the latest Meek Mill album Championships.

== Discography ==
=== Albums/scratches/production/mix ===
- Def Jam Recordings Presents

(CD, Comp, Promo) Hustlin' (Remix) Def Jam Recordings (2006)

- Tell Em Why U Madd

(Album) Surviving the Game Columbia (1999)

- Chicago '85 ... The Movie

(CD) Doin' Wrong DreamWorks (2000)

- Charmbracelet

(CD, Album) Boy (I Need You), You MonarC, Island Records (2002)

- The Blueprint, The Gift & The Curse

(4xLP, Album) U Don't Know (Remix) Roc-A-Fella Records (2002)

- Welcome to New York City

(12") Roc-A-Fella Records (2002)

- Boy (I Need You)

(CD, Single, Promo) Island Def Jam Music Group (2003)

- Flipside

(12", Promo) Roc-A-Fella Records (2003)

- Dirt Off Your Shoulder / Encore Roc-A-Fella Records

(2003)

- What We Do Roc-A-Fella Records

(2002)

- The Chittlin Circuit

(CD) Ladies' Jam Fastlife (2005)

- Philadelphia Freeway

(CD) Roc-A-Fella Records (2003)

- 99 Problems / My 1st Song

(12") Roc-A-Fella Records (2004)

- Be Your Girl

(12", Promo) TVT Records (2004)

- Get Crunk Shorty

(12", Promo) Jive (2004)

- Girlfight

(12", Promo) Virgin Records America, Inc. (2004)

- Rock Co. Kane Flow

(12") Seven Heads (2004)

- The Grind Date

(12") Sanctuary Records (2004)

- The Grind Date / Shopping Bags

(12", Promo) Sanctuary Records (2004)

- What's Happenin! / Salt Shaker

(12", Promo) TVT Recordings (2004)

- Dynomite (Going Postal)

(12", Promo) J Records (2005)

- Never Been In Love

(12") Geffen Records (2005)

- The Minstrel Show

(Album) Atlantic (2005)

- 4:21 ... The Day After

(Album) Def Jam Recordings (2006)

- The Pretty Toney Album

(Album) Tooken Back Def Jam Recordings (2004)

- Def Jam Recordings Presents

(CD, Comp, Promo) The Champ Def Jam Recordings (2004)

- Dynomite (Going Postal) /

Chicago-Rillas (12", Max) J Records (2006)

- Hustlin' Remix

(12") Def Jam Recordings (2006)

- Kingdom Come

(Album) Roc-A-Fella Records (2006)

- Eardrum

(Album) Blacksmith Music (2007)

- Tambourine

(12") Geffen Records (2007)

- Jeanius

(2xLP, Album, Ltd) Blacksmith (2008)

- NY's Finest

(Album) Nature Sounds (2008)

- Blackout! 2

(Album) Def Jam Recordings (2009)

- Fishscale

(Album) The Champ Def Jam Recordings (2004)

- King

(Album) I'm Talkin' To You Atlantic (2006)

- American Gangster

(Album) Ignorant Sh*t Roc-A-Fella Records (2007)

- Strength & Loyalty

(CD, Album) 9mm Interscope Records (2007)

- T.I. Vs T.I.P.

(Album) Help Is Coming Atlantic (2007)

- Theater of the Mind

(Album) Nasty Girl Island Def Jam Music Group (2008)

- Music Inspired By The Film:

More Than A Game (CD, Album) History Interscope Records (2009)

- The Blueprint 3

(CD, Album) RocNation (2009)

== Awards and nominations ==
Grammy Awards

Year	Nominee / work	Award	Result	Ref.
2022	Donda	Grammy Award for Album of the Year	Nominated	
2019	Everything Is Love	Grammy Award for Best Urban Contemporary Album	Won	
2018	4:44	Grammy Award for Album of the Year	Nominated	
2018	"The Story of O.J."	Grammy Award for Record of the Year	Nominated	
2011	"Empire State of Mind"	Grammy Award for Record of the Year	Nominated	
2005	The College Dropout	Grammy Award for Album of the Year	Nominated	
2003	Nellyville	Grammy Award for Album of the Year	Nominated	
