= Soul Train Music Award for Rhythm & Bars Award =

Annual US music award

This page lists the winners and nominees for the Soul Train Music Rhythm & Bars Award. Originally titled Best Hip-Hop Song of the Year, the award has been given since the 2010 ceremony. It was renamed to its current title in 2016. Cardi B and Drake are the acts with the most wins in this category, both winning twice.

== Winners and nominees ==
Winners are listed first and highlighted in bold.

=== 2010s ===
Year	Artist	Song	Ref
2010
2010	**Eminem (featuring Rihanna)**	**"Love the Way You Lie"**	
2010	Big Boi (featuring Cutty)	"Shutterbugg"	
2010	Drake	"Find Your Love"	
2010	Nicki Minaj	"Your Love"	
2010	Rick Ross (featuring Styles P)	"B.M.F. (Blowin' Money Fast)"	
2010	T.I. (featuring Keri Hilson)	"Got Your Back"	
2011
2011	**Nicki Minaj (featuring Drake)**	**"Moment 4 Life"**	
2011	Chris Brown (featuring Lil Wayne and Busta Rhymes)	"Look at Me Now"	
2011	Lupe Fiasco (featuring Trey Songz)	"Out of My Head	
2011	Jay-Z and Kanye West (featuring Otis Redding)	"Otis"	
2011	Kanye West (featuring Rihanna)	"All of the Lights"	
2012
2012	**Kanye West (featuring Big Sean, Pusha T and 2 Chainz)**	**"Mercy"**	
2012	2 Chainz (featuring Drake)	"No Lie"	
2012	Nas	"Daughters"	
2012	Wale (featuring Miguel)	"Lotus Flower Bomb"	
2012	Young Jeezy (featuring Ne-Yo)	"Leave You Alone"	
2013
2013	**Wale (featuring Tiara Thomas)**	**"Bad"**	
2013	Drake	"Started from the Bottom"	
2013	J. Cole (featuring Miguel)	"Power Trip"	
2013	Jay-Z (featuring Justin Timberlake)	"Holy Grail"	
2013	Kendrick Lamar (featuring Drake)	"Poetic Justice"	
2013	Nicki Minaj (featuring Lil Wayne)	"High School"	
2014
2014	**Chris Brown (featuring Lil Wayne and Tyga)**	**"Loyal"**	
2014	Iggy Azalea (featuring Charli XCX)	"Fancy"	
2014	Drake (featuring Majid Jordan)	"Hold On, We're Going Home"	
2014	Nicki Minaj	"Pills n Potions"	
2014	Schoolboy Q (featuring BJ the Chicago Kid)	"Studio"	
2014	T.I. (featuring Iggy Azalea)	"No Mediocre"	
2015
2015	**Kendrick Lamar**	**"Alright"**	
2015	Big Sean (featuring Drake and Kanye West)	"Blessing"	
2015	Big Sean (featuring E-40)	"IDFWU"	
2015	Fetty Wap	"Trap Queen"	
2015	Nicki Minaj (featuring Drake and Lil Wayne)	"Truffle Butter"	
2016
2016	**Fat Joe and Remy Ma (featuring French Montana and Infared)**	**"All the Way Up"**	
2016	Chance the Rapper (featuring Lil Wayne and 2 Chainz)	"No Problem"	
2016	DJ Khaled (featuring Drake)	"For Free"	
2016	Drake	"Controlla"	
2016	Drake (featuring Wizkid and Kyla)	"One Dance"	
2017
2017	**Cardi B**	**"Bodak Yellow"**	
2017	DJ Khaled (featuring Rihanna and Bryson Tiller)	"Wild Thoughts"	
2017	French Montana (featuring Swae Lee)	"Unforgettable"	
2017	Kendrick Lamar	"Humble."	
2017	Yo Gotti (featuring Nicki Minaj)	"Rake It Up"	
2018
2018	**Drake**	**"In My Feelings"**	
2018	Cardi B (with Bad Bunny and J Balvin)	"I Like It"	
2018	Childish Gambino	"This Is America"	
2018	DJ Khaled (featuring Justin Bieber, Chance the Rapper and Quavo)	"No Brainer"	
2018	The Carters	"Apeshit"	
2019
2019	**Cardi B**	**"Money"**	
2019	21 Savage (featuring J. Cole)	"A Lot"	
2019	DaBaby	"Suge"	
2019	J. Cole	"Middle Child"	
2019	Meek Mill (featuring Drake)	"Going Bad"	
2019	Megan Thee Stallion (featuring DaBaby)	"Cash Shit"	

=== 2020s ===
Year	Artist	Song	Ref
2020
2020	**Megan Thee Stallion**	**"Savage"**	
2020	Cardi B (featuring Megan Thee Stallion)	"WAP"	
2020	DaBaby (featuring Roddy Ricch)	"Rockstar"	
2020	DJ Khaled (featuring Lil Durk)	"Popstar"	
2020	Drake (featuring Lil Durk)	"Laugh Now Cry Later"	
2020	Roddy Ricch	"The Box"	

== See also ==
- Soul Train Music Award for Best Song of the Year
