= Derek Dixie =

American musician and record producer

- Born: Derek James Dixie; Youngstown, Ohio, United States
- Genres: R&B; pop; hip hop; soul
- Occupations: Musician; record producer
- Instruments: Drums; strings; keyboard

Removed non-existent infobox field

Derek James Dixie is an American musician, record producer, and musical director best known for his work with Beyoncé, Chloe x Halle, and The Carters. He has five Grammy nominations and one Emmy nomination.

== Early life and education ==
Dixie grew up in Youngstown, Ohio. He attended Youngstown State University and graduated from The Recording Workshop in Chillicothe, Ohio. Afterwards he taught audio engineering at The Recording Workshop.His brother is music producer Art Dixie.

== Career ==
=== MTV’s Making His Band with Sean "Diddy" Combs ===
In 2009, Dixie was one of 42 finalists in the MTV show "Making His Band," about Sean "Diddy" Combs’ search for a band to play on his upcoming album, Last Dance in Paris.

=== Super Bowl ===
Dixie was the music director for Beyoncé’s solo Super Bowl halftime show performance in 2013 and again in 2016 when she co-headlined with Coldplay and Bruno Mars.

In 2019, Dixie arranged and orchestrated a performance by Chloe x Halle for Super Bowl LIII with 30 Youngstown State University musicians and a Los Angeles horn and string ensemble.

“I am proud that I was able to put such an important task in the hands of my hometown,” he said. “When you hear the arrangement, I hope you will feel that every note, chord and rhythm in the orchestration means something.”

— Derek Dixie,

=== Beyoncé ===
After almost ten years of working with Beyoncé as Music Director, Dixie received an Emmy nomination for Outstanding Music Direction for HOMECOMING: A Film by Beyoncé.

Dixie worked with Beyoncé to create "Black Parade", an anthemic song (released on Juneteenth) celebrating her heritage, hometown and African roots, reflecting on the Black Experience in America.

== Songwriting, instrument, arrangement, vocal and production credits ==
List of song productions, string/horn arrangements and co-writes, showing year released and album name
Title	Year	Artist	Album
"Pretty Hurts"; "Partition"; "Blow"; "Drunk in Love" (Featuring Jay-Z)	2013	Beyoncé	Beyoncé
"7/11"; "Ring Off"; "Flawless Remix" (Featuring Nicki Minaj)	2014	Beyoncé	Beyoncé: Platinum Edition
"Don't Hurt Yourself"; "6 Inch" (Featuring The Weeknd); "Daddy Lessons"; "All Night"; "Formation"	2016	Beyoncé	Lemonade
"Summer"; "BOSS"	2018	The Carters	Everything Is Love
"Babybird"	2018	Chloe x Halle	The Kids Are Alright
"Bigger"; "Find Your Way Back"; "Don't Jealous Me"; "Ja Ara E"; "Brown Skin Girl" (With Blue Ivy Carter, Saint Jhn & Wizkid); "Keys to the Kingdom"; "Otherside"; "Scar"; "Spirit"	2019	Beyoncé	The Lion King: The Gift
"Welcome"; "Crazy In Love"; "Freedom"; "Formation"; "Sorry"; "Kitty Kat"; "Bow Down"; "I Been On"; "Drunk In Love"; "Diva"; "Flawless/Feeling Myself"; "Top Off"; "7/11"; "Party"; "Don't Hurt Yourself"; "I Care"; "Partition"; "Yonce"; "Mi Gente"; "Baby Boy"; "You Don't Love Me (No, No, No)"; "Hold Up"; "Countdown"; "Check On It"; "Deja Vu"; "Run The World (Girls)"; "Lose My Breath"; "Say My Name"; "Soldier"; "Get Me Bodied"; "Single Ladies (Put A Ring On It)"; "Love On Top"; "Shining (Thank You)"	2019	Beyoncé	Homecoming: The Live Album
"Intro"; "Forgive Me"; "Wonder What She Thinks of Me"	2020	Chloe x Halle	Ungodly Hour
"Black Parade"	2020	Beyoncé	The Lion King: The Gift (Deluxe Edition)
"People of the Pride"	2021	Coldplay	Music of the Spheres
"Pray It Away"; "Make It Look Easy"	2023	Chlöe	In Pieces
"Overture" (Featuring Lin-Manuel Miranda); "Intro"; "Requiem for a Dream"; "Truth or Dare" (Featuring Freddie Gibbs); "Outro"; "Demigod"; "Night 4"; "Awards"; "Mad"; "Prodigy"; "Intermission"; "Show Me"; "Plain Jane"; "Tap"; "Hurt"; "Blind"; "Delilah"; "Get Here" (Featuring Stevie Wonder)	2023	Chika	Samson: The Album
"Ameriican Requiem"; "Daughter"; "Amen"	2024	Beyoncé	Cowboy Carter

== Film & documentary scoring ==
Year	Title	Director	Studio/Distributor	Notes
2019	HΘMΣCΘMING	Beyoncé; Ed Burke	Parkwood & Netflix	
2020	Black Is King	Beyoncé; Kwasi Fordjour	Parkwood & Walt Disney Pictures	Scored with MeLo-X & James William Blades

== Awards ==
Dixie has five Grammy nominations and one Emmy nomination.

=== Emmy Awards ===
Year	Title	Artist	Category	Role	Result
2019	Homecoming: A Film by Beyoncé	Beyoncé	Outstanding Music Direction	Co-Music Director	Nominated

=== Grammy Awards ===
Year	Title	Artist	Category	Role	Result
2017	Lemonade	Beyoncé	Album Of the Year	Producer	Nominated
2021	"Black Parade"	Beyoncé	Record of the Year	Producer	Nominated
2021	"Black Parade"	Beyoncé	Song of the Year	Songwriter	Nominated
2021	"Black Parade"	Beyoncé	Best R&B Song	Songwriter	Nominated
2023	Music of the Spheres	Coldplay	Album of the Year	Songwriter	Nominated
