= Everything Is Love =

2018 studio album by Beyoncé and Jay-Z as the Carters

Studio album by the Carters
- Released: June 16, 2018
- Studios: U Arena, Paris; The Church, London; Kingslanding West, Los Angeles
- Genres: Hip-hop; R&B
- Length: 38:18
- Labels: Parkwood; Roc Nation; Columbia; Sony
- Producers: The Carters; 808-Ray; Beat Butcha; Boi-1da; Cool & Dre; David Andrew Sitek; D'Mile; Smittybeatz; Derek Dixie; El Michels; Fred Ball; Illmind; Jahaan Sweet; MeLo-X; Mike Dean; Nav; Nova Wav; Pharrell; Sevn Thomas

Beyoncé chronology
Lemonade (2016)	Everything Is Love (2018)	Homecoming: The Live Album (2019)

Jay-Z chronology
4:44 (2017)	Everything Is Love (2018)

Singles from Everything Is Love
- 1. "Apeshit" Released: June 16, 2018

Everything Is Love is the debut studio album by American musical superduo the Carters, consisting of spouses Beyoncé Knowles-Carter and Shawn "Jay-Z" Carter. It was released on June 16, 2018, by their respective labels Parkwood Entertainment and Roc Nation—with distribution from Columbia Records, a division of Sony Music Entertainment. Beyoncé and Jay-Z produced the album alongside a variety of collaborators, including Cool & Dre, Boi-1da, and Pharrell Williams. Additional vocalists recorded for the album include Williams, Quavo, Offset (both from Migos), and Ty Dolla Sign, among others. The hip-hop and R&B album incorporates soul and trap sounds, and its lyrics explore themes of romantic love, fame, wealth, and black pride.

The album was not made public until its release was announced by Beyoncé and Jay-Z while onstage at a London concert for their On the Run II Tour and later through their social media accounts. It was originally exclusive to the music distribution service Tidal, before given a wider release on June 18, 2018. Everything Is Love debuted at number two on the US Billboard 200, and it reached the top five on charts in Canada, the Netherlands, Poland, Switzerland, and the UK. At the 61st Annual Grammy Awards, the album won for Best Urban Contemporary Album.

== Background and recording ==
View of Paris La Défense Arena (formerly named UArena), where the album was partially recorded.

Plans about a joint album by the couple were announced by Jay-Z during an interview with The New York Times in 2017 when he said that they used "art almost like a therapy session" to create new music. However, since they also worked on their respective albums 4:44 and Lemonade, and Beyoncé's music progressed more rapidly, the project was temporarily stopped. Rumors about the collaborative project began emerging in March 2018 when the couple announced their On the Run II Tour. The album was reportedly conceived for years.

The majority of the album was recorded at U Arena in Paris; "Friends", "Black Effect" and "Salud!" were recorded at Kingslanding Studios West in Los Angeles, while further recording for "Summer" and "Nice" was done at The Church Studios in London. Beyoncé and Jay-Z co-produced all of the songs on the album themselves, with further producers including Pharrell, Cool & Dre, Boi-1da, Jahaan Sweet, David Andrew Sitek, D'Mile, El Michels, Fred Ball, Illmind, MeLo-X, Mike Dean and Nav. The album was predominantly recorded by Stuart White and Gimel "Young Guru" Keaton.

== Music and lyrics ==
Music critics generally categorized Everything Is Love as hip-hop and R&B with prominent influences of trap and classic soul of the 1960s–1970s. Craig Jenkins from Vulture wrote that Beyoncé played the role of an "R&B heavyweight" doubling as a "formidable rapper, showcasing her talents for vocal belting and complex rap cadences. In a review for The New York Times, Jon Pareles opined that Everything Is Love exuded less vulnerability than Beyoncé and Jay-Z's respective albums Lemonade and 4:44, with references to classic hip-hop, R&B, and "disorienting electronic soundscapes".

"Like the fifth act of a hip-hop and R&B Shakespearean comedy, Everything Is Love finds our lovers reunited, their misunderstandings resolved, their vows renewed (Beyoncé: 'you fucked up the first stone/ we had to get remarried'), and their family looking ahead to decades of more peaceful prosperity. Outrageous, multiple-mansioned, diamonds-and-watches-and-Lambos prosperity, symbolically tied to an agenda of black capitalism as racial uplift and reparations."

— Carl Wilson, Slate

The album contains lyrics about the couple's romantic love, lavish lifestyle, media worship, wealth, black pride and fame; themes that were found to be characteristic of the whole record. Other songs feature the pair singing about their family affairs as well as maintaining their relationship following hardships (i.e. infidelity). Time magazine's Maura Johnston regarded the album as another "blockbuster duet in R&B and hip-hop"; comparable to Marvin Gaye and Tammi Terrell's soul songs from the 1960s and the 1995 Method Man and Mary J. Blige recording "I'll Be There for You/You're All I Need to Get By"; while incorporating contemporary elements in the form of trap beats, critical references to the National Football League and the Grammy Awards, and playing with "public perceptions of the duo's relationship". Jenkins said it extolled African-American entrepreneurship while presenting Jay-Z as "a doting father and husband, an entrepreneur and altruist with ideas about how everyone else should handle their businesses, a king-tier braggart, and a rap legend".

== Artwork ==
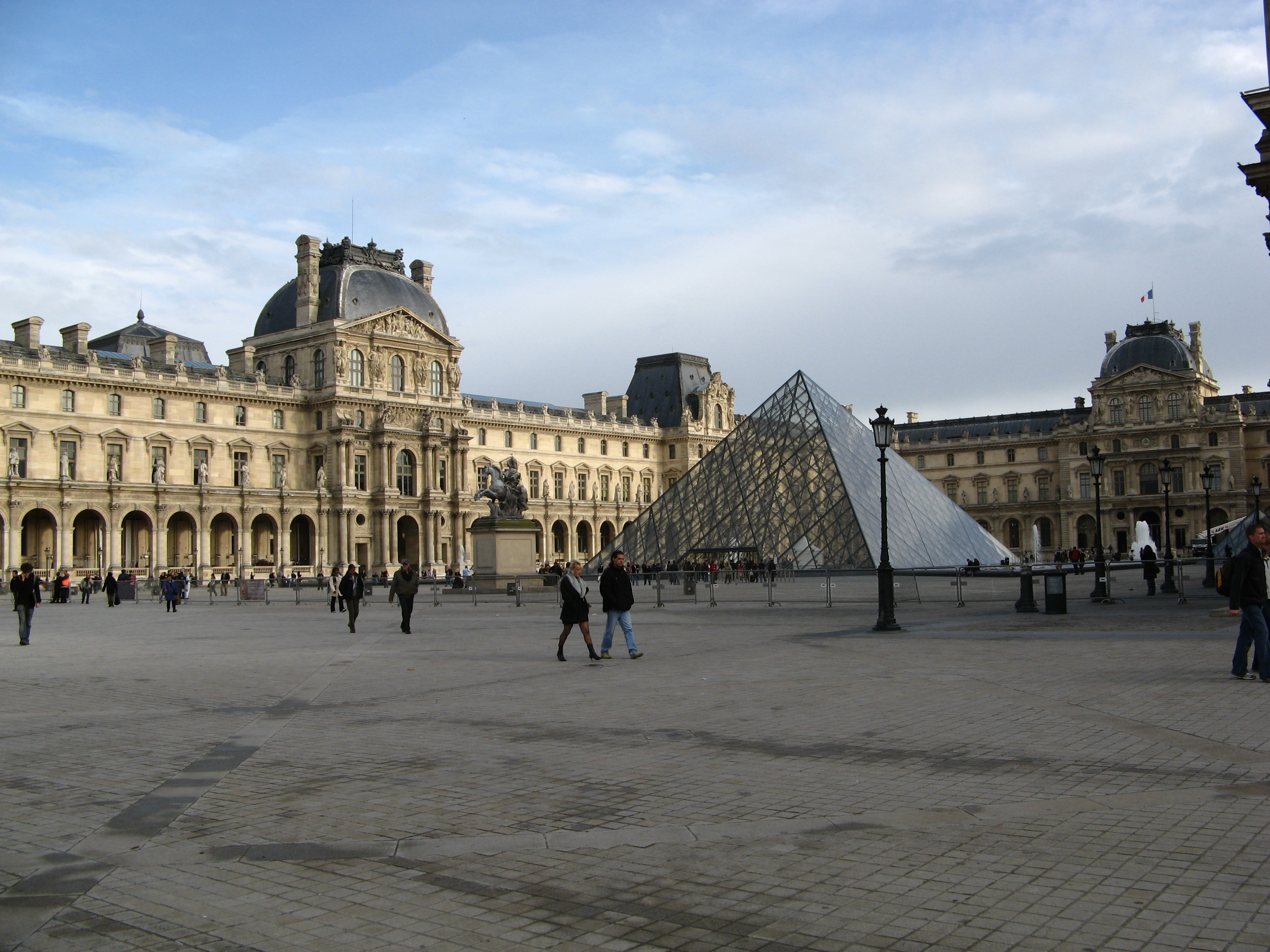
Following the album release, the Louvre created a guided tour of the art displayed in the "Apeshit" music video.

The artwork for the album is a still frame from the music video for "Apeshit". It features two of Beyoncé's background dancers, Jasmine Harper and Nicholas "Slick" Stewart, at the Louvre—Harper is seen picking the hair of Stewart while standing in front of Leonardo da Vinci's Mona Lisa.

== Release and promotion ==
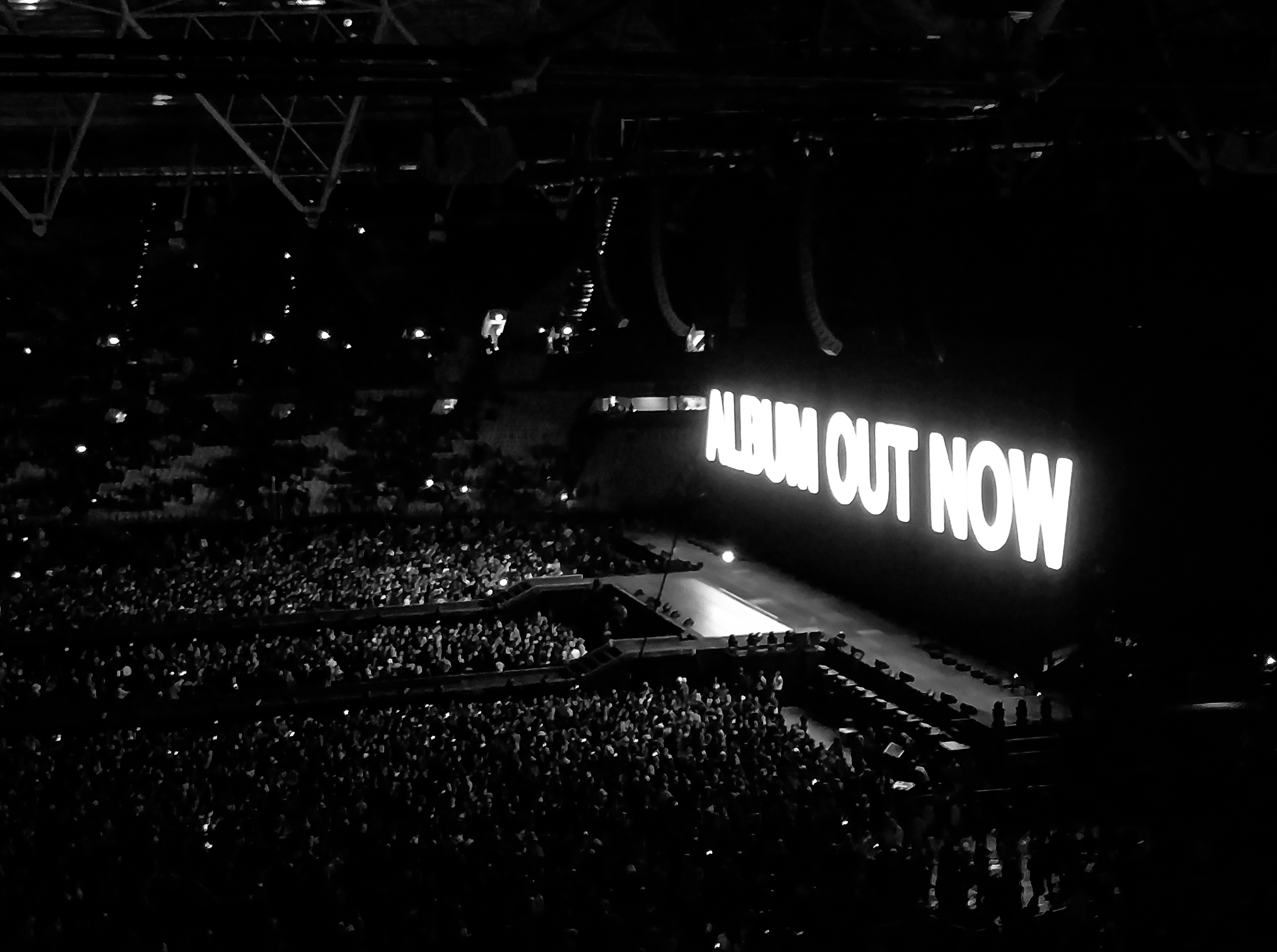
The surprise release of the album was announced during their On the Run II Tour concert in London

On June 6, 2018, Beyoncé and Jay-Z embarked on the joint On the Run II Tour, a sequel to their 2014 On the Run Tour. At the end of their second show at London Stadium in London on June 16, 2018, Beyoncé announced to the crowd that the duo had a surprise before leaving the stage. Then, the music video for "Apeshit" played on the LED video screen onstage. Following the conclusion of the video, the words "ALBUM OUT NOW" came across the screen. Everything Is Love was subsequently released exclusively via Jay-Z's streaming service Tidal and all audience members received a free six-month trial subscription in order to be able to stream the album. The album was also made available for purchase on Tidal's online music store. The release was announced worldwide on Beyoncé and Jay-Z's respective social media accounts with the artist of the album being monikered as the Carters. On the same day, the music video for the album's second track and lead single, "Apeshit", was released on Beyoncé's official YouTube channel. It was directed by Ricky Saiz and filmed at the Louvre in Paris.

On June 18, the album was made available across numerous other platforms, including iTunes Store, Apple Music, Deezer, Amazon Music, Napster, Google Play Music and Spotify.

== Critical reception ==
Professional ratings
Aggregate scores
Source	Rating
AnyDecentMusic?	7.4/10
Metacritic	80/100
Review scores
Source	Rating
AllMusic	4.5/5 stars
The A.V. Club	B+
The Daily Telegraph	4/5 stars
The Guardian	3/5 stars
The Independent	4/5 stars
NME	4/5 stars
The Observer	4/5 stars
Pitchfork	8.2/10
Rolling Stone	4/5 stars
The Times	4/5 stars

According to the review aggregator Metacritic, Everything Is Love received "generally favorable reviews" based on a weighted average score of 80 out of 100 from 22 critic scores.

Reviewing the album for The New York Times, Joe Coscarelli said it "completes the Knowles-Carter conceptual trilogy"—referring to the previous releases of Lemonade and 4:44—"in an expert, tactical showing of family brand management". Music critic Nicholas Hautman of Us Weekly wrote: "It's clear from the very first listen that Beyoncé outshines her husband on much of the record, which really should have been marketed as 'Beyoncé featuring Jay-Z' rather than 'Beyoncé and Jay-Z' (or 'the Carters', in this case). His verses are few and far between in comparison to hers, but it still somehow feels like a balanced body of work from two of the greatest artists of our time." In The Guardian, Petridis believed the album retreads braggadocio centering around the duo's wealth and excellence, with less musical daring, but still does so with likeable music, genuine wit, and energy. As The Daily Telegraph music critic Neil McCormick pointed out, "Everything Is Love certainly doesn’t have the musical expansiveness of Lemonade. There are neither ballads nor bangers, and not much in the way of melodic song construction at all. Rather, these are snappily repetitive beats on which the stars can put across their message as a form of hip hop conversation." For Variety, Jim Aswad described it as "solid and generally satisfying, but not the best from either."

Will Hodgkinson of The Times reviewed track-by-track, stated: "Jay-Z is as dynamic as ever and the new, tough Beyoncé demands attention on this surprise album, [...] despite the ups and downs detailed on Beyoncé's Lemonade and Jay-Z's subsequent mea culpa 4:44. Instead they are coming out fighting, with all that fame and money making them defensive, even paranoid, while a mix of classic soul, hard-hitting hip-hop and slinky R&B." Pitchfork contributor Briana Younger wrote that the album "is a compromise between the spoils of Lemonade's war and the fruits of 4:44's labor", and that "within this complex, messy and beautifully black display, the Carters find absolution." Giving the album one and a half stars, Adam Rothbarth of Tiny Mix Tapes stated that everything about the album "feels superficial, from the artists' constant pronouncement of their love for each other to their engagement with topics like fashion". He also added that the "most boring aspect of the album is its centerpiece: the couple's obsession with their wealth".

=== Accolades ===
Select year-end rankings (2018) for Everything Is Love
Publication	List	Rank	Source
Associated Press	Top 2018 Albums	6	
Billboard	50 Best Albums of 2018	10	
Complex	The Best Albums of 2018	7	
Esquire	20 Best Albums of 2018	18	
Exclaim!	Top 10 Hip-Hop Albums Best of 2018	5	
HipHopDX	The Best Rap Albums of 2018	2	
NME	Albums of the Year 2018	91	
NPR	The 50 Best Albums of 2018	50	
Rolling Stone	50 Best Albums of 2018	48	
Uproxx	The 50 Best Albums of 2018	36	

Decade-end list
Publication	List	Rank	Year	Source
Cleveland.com	100 Greatest Albums of the 2010s	86	2019	

Awards
Year	Organization	Award	Result	Ref.
2018	BET Hip Hop Awards	Album of the Year	Won	
2019	BET Awards	Album of the Year	Nominated	
2019	Gaffa Awards	Best International Album	Nominated	
2019	Grammy Awards	Best Urban Contemporary Album	Won	
2019	NAACP Image Awards	Outstanding Album	Nominated	
2019	2018 Brit Awards	Best International Group	Won	

== Commercial performance ==
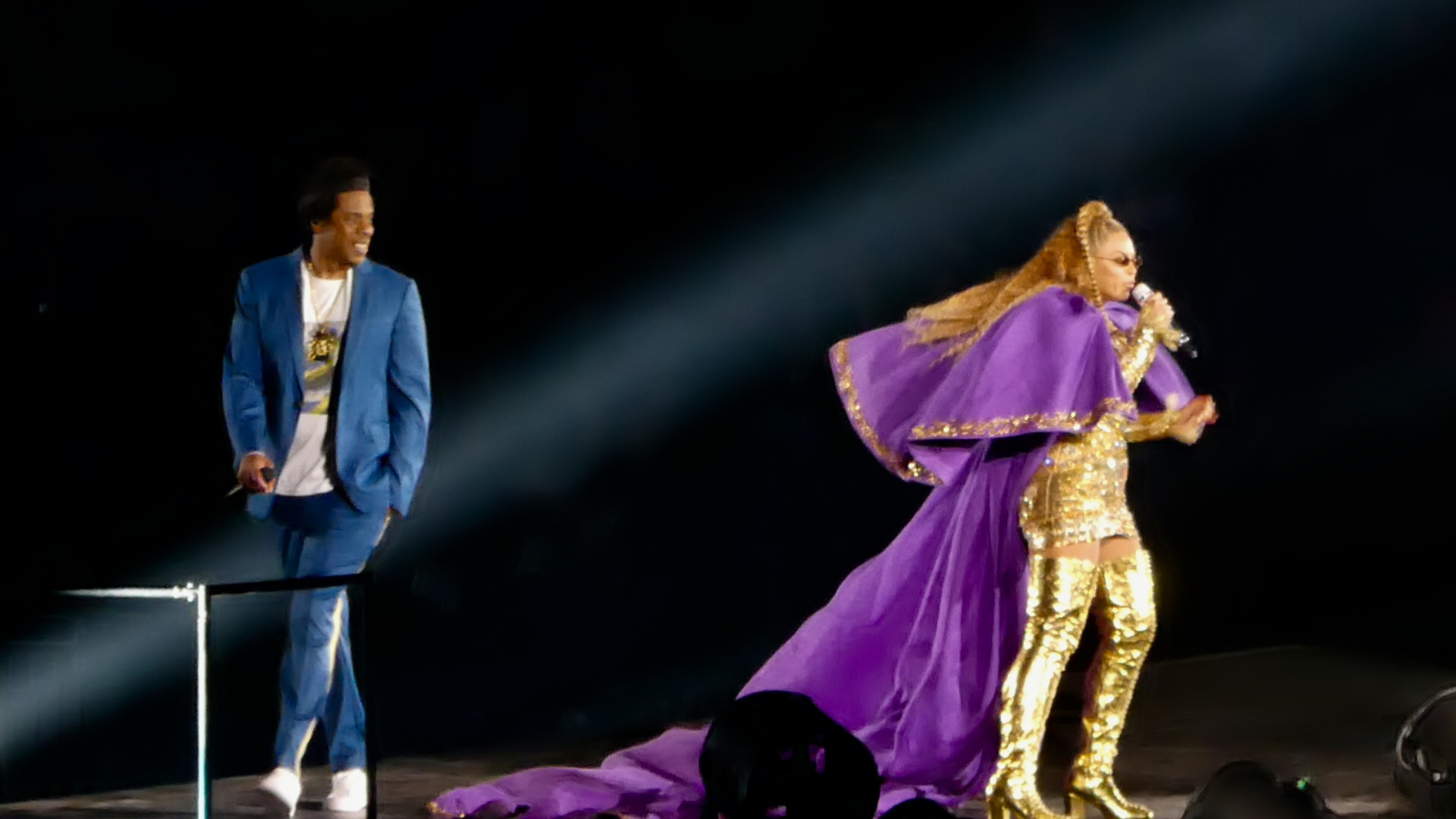
Beyoncé and Jay Z performing at the tour.

Everything is Love debuted at number two on the US Billboard 200 chart, earning 123,000 album-equivalent units, (including 70,000 copies as pure album sales) in its first week. The album debuted on the chart after less than six full days of activity on Tidal, and four days of activity on all other digital retailers and streaming services. In its second week, the album dropped to number four on the chart, earning an additional 59,000 units. In its third week, the album dropped to number eight on the chart, earning 33,000 more units. In its fourth week, the album remained at number eight on the chart, earning 29,000 units. In 2018, Everything is Love was ranked as the 70th-best-performing album of the year on the Billboard 200. On January 14, 2019, the album was certified gold by the Recording Industry Association of America (RIAA) for combined sales and album-equivalent units of over 500,000 units in the United States.

== Track listing ==
Standard edition
No.	Title	Writer(s)	Producer(s)	Length
1.	"Summer"	Beyoncé; Shawn Carter; Homer Steinweiss; James Fauntleroy II; Marcello Valenzano; Thomas Brenneck; Leon Michels; Michael Herard; Andre Lyon	The Carters; Cool & Dre	4:45
2.	"Apeshit"	Beyoncé; Carter; Pharrell Williams; Quavious Marshall; Kiari Cephus	The Carters; Williams; Stuart White	4:24
3.	"Boss"	Beyoncé; Carter; Tyrone Griffin Jr.; Dernst Emile II	The Carters; Derek Dixie; D'Mile; Mike Dean; MeLo-X; White	4:04
4.	"Nice"	Beyoncé; Carter; Williams; Denisia Andrews; Brittany Coney	The Carters; Williams	3:53
5.	"713"	Beyoncé; Carter; Valenzano; Lyon; Rayshon Cobbs Jr.; Robert Caldwell; Lonnie Lynn; Bruce Malament; Norman Harris; James Yancey; Andre Young; Melvin Bradford; Scott Storch; Paul Bender; Simon Mavin^{[a]}; Perrin Moss; Naomi Saalfield	The Carters; Cool & Dre; 808-Ray; Fred Ball	3:13
6.	"Friends"	Beyoncé; Carter; Matthew Samuels; Jahaan Sweet; Andrews; Coney; Tavoris Hollins Jr.; Amir Esmailian; Navraj Goraya; Rupert Thomas Jr.	The Carters; Boi-1da; Sweet; Fred Ball	5:44
7.	"Heard About Us"	Beyoncé; Carter; Samuels; Nija Charles; Sweet; Anderson Hernandez; Ramon Ibanga Jr.; Sean Combs; James Mtume; Jean-Claude Olivier; Christopher Wallace	The Carters; Boi-1da; Sweet; Vinylz; Illmind; Fred Ball	3:10
8.	"Black Effect"	Beyoncé; Carter; Andrews; Coney; Lyon; Cobbs, Jr.; Valenzano; Alexander Smith; Jun Kozuki^{[b]}	The Carters; Cool & Dre	5:15
9.	"LoveHappy"	Beyoncé; Carter; Andrews; Coney; Lynn; Charles; David Sitek; Bill Laswell; Thierry Planelle; Jean Touitou; Eddie Campbell; Ernie Johnson; Pete James; Raphael Saadiq; James Poyser; Robert Ozuna; Britney Spears; Glenn Standridge; Erica Wright; Larry Graham	The Carters; Sitek; Nova Wav	3:49
Total length:				38:18

Beyonce.com edition
No.	Title	Writer(s)	Producer(s)	Length
1.	"LoveHappy"			3:49
2.	"Apeshit"			4:24
3.	"Boss"			4:04
4.	"Nice"			3:53
5.	"713"			3:13
6.	"Friends"			5:44
7.	"Heard About Us"			3:10
8.	"The Black Effect"			5:13
9.	"Salud!"	Beyoncé; Carter; Valenzano; Lyon; Eliot Dubock; Terius Nash	The Carters; Cool & Dre; 808-Ray; Beat Butcha	3:33
Total length:				37:04

ChopNotSlop Remix
No.	Title	Length
1.	"Summer"	7:29
2.	"Boss"	6:59
3.	"Black Effect"	5:43
4.	"Friends"	8:23
5.	"LoveHappy"	5:15
6.	"Apeshit"	6:05
7.	"713"	5:50
8.	"Salud!"	5:27
9.	"Nice"	5:58
10.	"Heard About Us"	5:53
Total length:		63:02

- All tracks noted as "ChopNotSlop Remix" and credited to, The Carters, OG Ron C, Slim K and DJ Candlestick

Notes

- ^{^[a]} Simon Mavin is incorrectly credited as Simon Marvin
- ^{^[b]} Jun Kozuki is incorrectly credited as Jan Kozuki

Sample credits

- "Apeshit" contains
  - elements of an A$AP Rocky broadcast on Instagram Live.
  - an interpolation of "Faneto", performed by Chief Keef, written by Keith Farrelle Cozart.
- "713" contains
  - an interpolation of "Still D.R.E.", performed by Dr. Dre and Snoop Dogg, written by Melvin Bradford, Shawn Carter, Scott Storch and Andre Young.
  - samples from "Sphinx Gate", performed by Hiatus Kaiyote, written by Paul Bender, Simon Mavin, Perrin Moss and Naomi Saalfield.
  - samples from "The World It Softly Lulls", performed by Hiatus Kaiyote, written by Paul Bender, Simon Mavin, Perrin Moss and Naomi Saalfield.
  - an interpolation of "The Light", performed by Common, written by Robert Caldwell, Norman Harris, Lonnie Lynn, Bruce Malament and James Yancey.
- "Heard About Us" contains
  - an interpolation of "Juicy", performed by The Notorious B.I.G., written by Sean Puffy Combs, James Mtume, Jean-Claude Olivier and Christopher Wallace.
- "Black Effect" contains
  - a sample of "Broken Strings", performed by Flower Travellin' Band, written by Jun Kozuki.
- "LoveHappy" contains
  - a sample of "You Make My Life a Sunny Day", performed by Eddie & Ernie, written by Eddie Campbell, Ernie Johnson and Pete James.
  - elements of "Victory Is Certain" from APC Tracks Vol. 1, written by Bill Laswell, Jean Touitou and Thierry Planell.
  - an interpolation of "Love of My Life (An Ode to Hip-Hop)" performed by Erykah Badu and Common, written by Lonnie Lynn, Robert Ozuna, James Poyser, Raphael Saadiq, Glenn Standridge and Erica Wright.
  - samples from the Graham Central Station recording "The Jam", written by Larry Graham.

== Personnel ==
Credits adapted from Beyoncé's official website, Tidal and the album's liner notes. "Salud!" is track 10.

=== Musicians ===
- Beyoncé – vocals (all tracks)
- Jay-Z – vocals (all tracks)
- Rory Stonelove – additional vocals (track 1)
- Anthony Wilmot – additional vocals (track 1)
- Offset – additional vocals (track 2)
- Quavo – additional vocals (track 2)
- Blue Ivy Carter – additional vocals (track 3)
- Ty Dolla Sign – additional vocals (track 3)
- Pharrell – additional vocals (track 4)
- Nija Charles – background vocals (track 7)
- Dr. Lenora Antoinette Stines – additional vocals (track 8)
- Andre Christopher Lyon – additional vocals (track 10)
- Derek Dixie – string arrangement & additional keyboards (track 1); horn arrangement (tracks 1, 3)
- Chala Yancy – co-arrangement & strings (track 1)
- Nathalie Barrett-Mas – co-arrangement & strings (track 1)
- Crystal Alforque – co-arrangement & strings (track 1)
- Jessica McJunkins – co-arrangement & strings (track 1)
- Corbin Jones – co-arrangement (track 1); horns (tracks 1, 3)
- Christopher Gray – co-arrangement (track 1); horns (tracks 1, 3)
- Christopher Johnson – co-arrangement (track 1); horns (tracks 1, 3)
- Crystal Torres – co-arrangement (track 1); horns (tracks 1, 3)
- Arnetta Johnson – co-arrangement (track 1); horns (tracks 1, 3)
- Lessie Vonner – co-arrangement (track 1); horns (tracks 1, 3)
- Michael Jones – co-arrangement & horns (track 1)
- Damien Farmer – bass guitar (track 1)
- Peter Ortega – horns (track 3)
- Randy Ellis – horns (track 3)
- Richard Lucchese – horns (track 3)
- 808-Ray – additional programming (track 10)

=== Technical ===
- Tyler Scott – string engineering (track 1), recording (tracks 1, 4), assistant mix engineering (tracks 1, 3, 10)
- Stuart White – recording (all tracks); mixing (tracks 1–7, 9)
- Gimel Keaton – recording (tracks 1–3, 5–10); mixing (track 1)
- Mike Larson – recording (tracks 2, 4)
- DJ Durel – recording (track 2)
- Zeph Sowers – recording (track 9)
- Tony Maserati – mixing (tracks 1, 3, 8, 9)
- Leslie Brathwaite – mixing (tracks 4, 6)
- Chris Godbey – mixing (tracks 5, 10)
- Dan Ewins – assistant mix engineering (tracks 2, 5, 7); assistant engineering (track 7)
- Henri Davies – assistant mix engineering (track 8)
- Andy Maxell – assistant mix engineering (track 10)
- Adrien Crapanzano – assistant engineering (all tracks)
- Marcus Locock – assistant engineering (track 1)
- Lester Mendoza – assistant horn recording (tracks 1, 3); assistant string recording (track 1)
- Colin Leonard – mastering (all tracks)
- Teresa LaBarbera Whites – A&R

=== Production ===
- Beyoncé – production (tracks 1, 3, 5–10); co-production (track 2); vocal production (track 4)
- Jay-Z – production (tracks 1, 3, 5–10); co-production (track 2); vocal production (track 4)
- Cool & Dre – production (tracks 1, 5, 8, 10)
- Pharrell – production (tracks 2, 4)
- Boi-1da – production (tracks 6, 7)
- Jahaan Sweet – production (tracks 6, 7)
- D'Mile – production (track 3)
- Vinylz – production (track 7)
- !llmind – production (track 7)
- David Andrew Sitek – production (track 9)
- El Michels – co-production (track 1)
- Nav – co-production (track 6)
- Sevn Thomas – co-production (track 6)
- Beat Butcha – co-production (track 10)
- Fred Ball – additional production (tracks 5–7)
- Stuart White – additional production (tracks 2, 3)
- Derek Dixie – additional production (track 3)
- Mike Dean – additional production (track 3)
- MeLo-X – additional production (track 3)
- 808-Ray – additional production (track 5)
- Nova Wav – additional production (track 9)

== Charts ==
=== Weekly charts ===
Chart (2018)	Peak position
Australian Albums (ARIA)	6
Austrian Albums (Ö3 Austria)	21
Belgian Albums (Ultratop Flanders)	8
Belgian Albums (Ultratop Wallonia)	28
Canadian Albums (Billboard)	4
Czech Albums (ČNS IFPI)	29
Danish Albums (Hitlisten)	10
Dutch Albums (Album Top 100)	4
Finnish Albums (Suomen virallinen lista)	30
French Albums (SNEP)	44
German Albums (Offizielle Top 100)	23
Hungarian Albums (MAHASZ)	33
Irish Albums (Official Charts)	10
Italian Albums (FIMI)	20
Japan Hot Albums (Billboard Japan)	36
Japanese Albums (Oricon)	140
New Zealand Albums (RMNZ)	11
Norwegian Albums (VG-lista)	8
Polish Albums (ZPAV)	2
Portuguese Albums (AFP)	10
Scottish Albums (Official Charts)	7
Slovak Albums (IFPI)	15
Spanish Albums (PROMUSICAE)	9
Swedish Albums (Sverigetopplistan)	7
Swiss Albums (Schweizer Hitparade)	5
Swiss Albums (Romandie)	5
UK Albums (Official Charts)	5
US Billboard 200	2
US Top R&B/Hip-Hop Albums (Billboard)	1

=== Year-end charts ===
Chart (2018)	Position
Belgian Albums (Ultratop Flanders)	106
US Billboard 200	70
US Top R&B/Hip-Hop Albums (Billboard)	36

== Certifications ==
Region	Certification	Certified units/sales
Brazil (Pro-Música Brasil)	Gold	20,000^{‡}
Canada (Music Canada)	Gold	40,000^{‡}
United Kingdom (BPI)	Silver	60,000^{‡}
United States (RIAA)	Gold	500,000^{‡}
^{‡} Sales+streaming figures based on certification alone.

== Release history ==
List of release dates, showing region, format(s), label(s) and reference(s)
Region	Date	Format(s)	Label(s)	Ref.
Various	June 16, 2018	Streaming; digital download (Tidal exclusive)	Parkwood; Roc Nation	
Various	June 18, 2018	Streaming; digital download	Parkwood; Roc Nation	
Various	July 6, 2018	CD	Parkwood; Roc Nation	
Japan	August 22, 2018	CD	Sony Music	
