= Nasty P =

Scottish producer & DJ

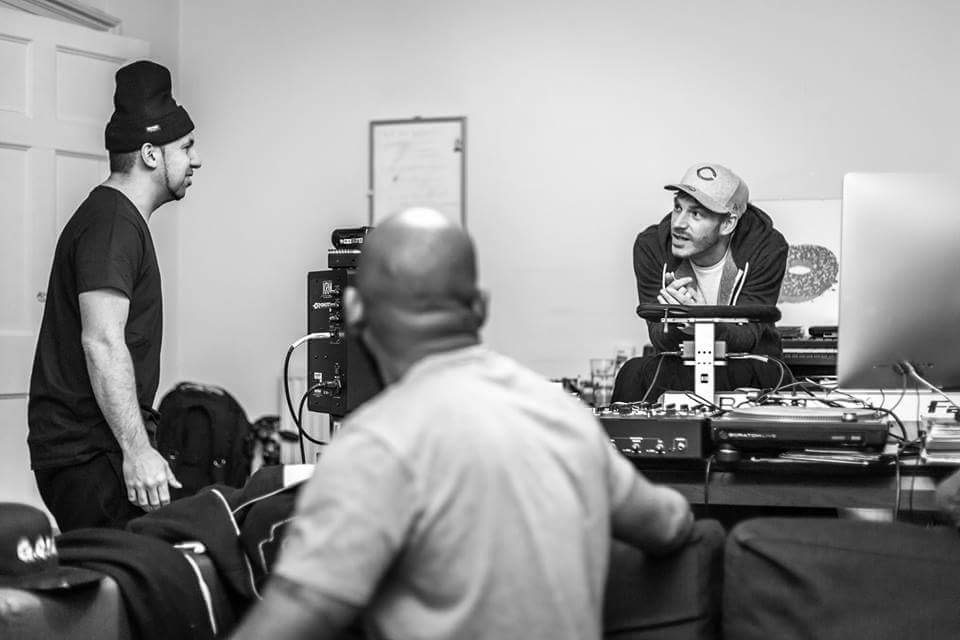

Background information
- Born: Paul Rutherford
- Origin: Edinburgh, Scotland
- Genres: Hip hop, electronica, Soul, instrumental hip hop, turntablism, beat
- Occupations: Producer, DJ, musician
- Instruments: Turntables, Korg, Moog, Logic
- Years active: 2000–present
- Labels: KFM, ILL Behaviour
- Website: richmundi.com

Nasty P (Paul Rutherford) is a hip hop Producer/DJ from Edinburgh, Scotland. As an artist and producer he has worked with Akil from Jurassic 5, Skinnyman and Ed O.G.

With five albums and two EPs released to date, Nasty P has a notable discography of albums and mixtapes from the acclaimed When the Smoke Clears to It Sounds Nicer When It's Nasty mashup album which includes "Watchtower Problem" featuring Jay Z vs Jimi Hendrix.

As a DJ, Nasty P has supported a number of well known hip hop artists from Beyoncé and Jay-Z on their 2018 On the Run II Tour, Arrested Development to Ghostface Killah and KRS-One, Roots Manuva, Rakim, Talib Kweli and Earl Sweatshirt. He is also a regular feature at Croatia's Outlook festival and Scotland's Kelburn Garden Festival.

In March 2014, Nasty P performed at TEDx Glasgow.

Aside from producing and DJing, Nasty P also co-runs Edinburgh's main hip hop club night, 'I Love Hip Hop' at The Bongo Club.

== Career ==
=== When the Smoke Clears ===
His debut album When the Smoke Clears, released on KFM Records in October 2005, garnered a 4/5 review from the German edition of Rolling Stone.

=== It Sounds Nicer When It's Nasty ===
Following the release of his second album, It Sounds Nicer When It's Nasty, a mash up album, Nasty P was featured in Itchy Magazine. The article complimented Nasty P on his offering to the subgenre, comparing his Bill Withers/Outkast and Jay Z/Jimi Hendrix splices with that of the Danger Mouse mash up The Beatles vs Jay Z on the now iconic Grey Album. With his Jay Z/Jimi Hendrix video clocking up to nearly 100,000 views on YouTube to date, Skinny Mag described the album as flawlessly produced with the collection displaying his skills with an MPC. The album went on to receive numerous plays on Radio 1's Zane Low show.

=== Choosers Can't Be Beggars ===
After his remix album It Sounds Nicer When it's Nasty, Nasty P released Choosers Can't be Beggars. Showcasing it in Edinburgh's State of Mind, the album brought international radio play, with the song "Signs" being played by Ally McCrae at BBC Radio One Sessions. With more attention being brought to the album by Steve Lamacq at BBC Radio 6 Music picking up on Record Cassettes and playing this on his show.

=== The Story Untold ===
The EP release was held at I Love Hip Hop. It was hosted by Profisee and MC M.A.D. (Groove Armada). The event showcased his album live, with a performance set piecing together the full album through live scratching and live triggers.

=== The Story So Far ===
A six-part video diary was created on the run up to the release of The Story So Far in March 2012, It was an introduction to Nasty P and what to expect from the album. The album brought further national radio play with Ally McCrae at BBC Radio One Sessions playing "State of Mind" feat. Akil and Profisee. The Story So Far received further radio play with "Blessed Thing" feat. Profisee and "Soul Biscuit" feat. Skinnyman.

=== No Tellin ===
Released May 2017 on KFM Records the boundary pushing EP provided an introduction to ‘Rich Mundi’ the alter ego of Nasty P. The main single "No Tellin" featured Ed O.G., Reks, Termanology and Akrobatik all established rappers in Massachusetts’ underground scene. The EP also featured collaborations with grammy nominee MC M.A.D. (Groove Armada) and Edinburgh's own Jane Gilbert. Receiving airplay on Glasgow's Sunny G Radio, Manchester's Rapstation and the French radio station c75live. The EP is an introduction to the 12-track album "Rich Mundi", set for release October 2017.

=== Undefeated EP ===
A collaboration with artist Reks released August 2024 titled Undefeated EP. The EP also features MC and Actor Slaine (rapper). Undefeated EP has brought international radio play, with "Tunnel Lights" being played by Statik Selektah on his radio show Shade 45

== Associated acts ==
Formed in September 2012, DarkSoul is an experimental soul/hip hop group with an electronic infusion featuring Nasty P and singer Naledi Herman. Having released their self-titled EP in March 2013, they have been a regular feature of the UK's festival circuit. DarkSoul were handpicked by jazz singer/songwriter Jamie Cullum to support him on the 2013 Edinburgh leg of his tour.

== Business ventures ==
=== Soul Biscuits 2002–2007 ===
Soul Biscuits is a creation of Nasty P and was a hip hop and funk night that ran once a month from 2002 to 2007 at Cabaret Voltaire. Soul Biscuits hosted breakdance events and MC battles and was a showcase for local talent such as Scottish electronic music producer Hudson Mohawke (then DJ Itchy). The club night was host to some of Britain's creative hip hop figures like Roots Manuva, Skinnyman MC Profisee and Killa Keller to name a few, some of which Nasty P later went on to work with.

=== I Love Hip Hop 2011–2017 ===
I Love Hip Hop has been running every Tuesday since 2011 in Edinburgh's well known Bongo Club. The club is run by Nasty P alongside his business partner. I Love Hip Hop brings live hip hop performances and guest appearances.

== Awards ==
In 2012 Nasty P was awarded the title of Global Stoli Artist of The Year, not just winning in his category but winning in every category. Nasty P later showcased his skills in New York and collaborated with Nina Sky.

== Logo and artwork ==
All album and EP artwork created by Sandy Carson.

== Discography ==
When The Smoke Clears (October 2005)

No.	Title	Length
1.	"Love Trip"
2.	"Lights Off"
3.	"My Cuz Marios"
4.	"L.I.F.E"
5.	"6 Days"
6.	"Liars"
7.	"Take A Look Around"
8.	"The Weather Man"
9.	"When The Smoke Clears"
10.	"In The Culture"
11.	"Blues Caught My Eye"
12.	"Listening"
13.	"Showtime"
14.	"Now U Know (last from the past)"
15.	"Ugly Britain"

It Sounds Nicer When It's Nasty Remix Album (April 2006)

No.	Title	Length
1.	"A Watchtower Problem"
2.	"White Episode"
3.	"One Love One Brave Heart"
4.	"Break Of the Hinges"
5.	"One Mike One M.P.C"
6.	"Aretha's Fat Booty"
7.	"Nasty Can"
8.	"Feelin Diamonds"
9.	"New Money"
10.	"Moment of Variety"
11.	"Aint No Elevators"
12.	"Dead Big"
13.	"Joni Mitchells On Top"

Choosers Can't Be Beggars (March 2011)

No.	Title	Length
1.	"Gotta Get That"
2.	"Records Cassettes"
3.	"Good Times"
4.	"Intense Impressions"
5.	"Zombie Disco"
6.	"I Did This"
7.	"Soul Biscuits"
8.	"Treated Me Like A Fool"
9.	"Madness"
10.	"Signs"

The Story Untold EP (February 2012)

No.	Title	Length
1.	"Good Times"
2.	"I Did This"
3.	"Lights Off"
4.	"Treated Me Like A Fool"
5.	"Six Days"
6.	"Madness"
7.	"Signs Part 1"
8.	"Plane Sale"

The Story So Far (March 2012)

No.	Title	Length
1.	"True Lies [Explicit]"
2.	"State of Mind (feat. Akil, Profisee) [Explicit]"
3.	"Caffeine Holiday"
4.	"Death of Disco [Explicit]"
5.	"Signs (Part 2) [Explicit]"
6.	"When The Smoke Clears"
7.	"Soul Biscuit (feat.Skinnyman) [Explicit]"
8.	"Wreck Cassettes"
9.	"Fiyah (feat.Ed.Og, Profisee, Mr Bang On, Serocee) [Explicit]"
10.	"Luv Trip"
11.	"Blessed Thing (feat.Profisee) [Explicit]"
12.	"Guard Your Safe (feat.Profisee) [Explicit]"

It Sounds Nicer When It's Nasty Part 2 Remix Album (September 2012)

No.	Title	Length
1.	"Nas – Made You Drive"
2.	"Lil Wayne- Milli Motion Picture"
3.	"Wu-Tang Clan vs. Lana Del Rey – The Jump Off Games"
4.	"MF DOOM vs. MGMT – Ladies Pretend"
5.	"Jay Z vs. Skitz – A Rebel Hook"
6.	"Beastie Boys – No Sleep Til the Hook's In"
7.	"Game feat. The Notorious B.I.G – It Was All a Dream"
8.	"Ian Brown – For Everything a Remix"
9.	"Outkast – So Fresh and Summer Clean"
10.	"Nirvana vs. Dead prez – Hell Yeah Come As U Are"
11.	"Etta James – The Soul Never Goes Blind"

No Tellin E.P (May 2017)

No.	Title	Length
1.	"No Tellin (feat. Ed O.G., Reks, Termanology & Akrobatik) [Explicit]"
2.	"No Tellin (feat. Ed O.G., Reks, Termanology & Akrobatik) [Rich Mundi Remix] [Explicit]"
3.	"No Tellin (Rich Mundi Remix Instrumental)"
4.	"Truth Story"
5.	"Round Again (feat. M.A.D.)"
6.	"One More Time (feat. Jane Gilbert)"
7.	"The Win (feat. Cosimo)"

Undefeated E.P (August 2024)

No.	Title	Length
1.	"Bounce"
2.	"Tunnel Lights (feat Slaine)"
3.	"Recognize Game"
4.	"Undefeated"
5.	"Reks Go Dumb"
