= 2018 BET Hip Hop Awards =

Annual edition of the awards show

- Date: October 16, 2018
- Location: Jackie Gleason Theater, The Fillmore Miami Beach
- Hosted by: DeRay Davis

The 2018 BET Hip Hop Awards are a recognition ceremony held on October 16, 2018 at the Fillmore Miami Beach at Jackie Gleason Theater in Miami Beach, Florida. The nominations were announced on September 9, 2018.

Drake led the BET Hip-Hop Awards 2018 with eleven nominations, followed by Cardi B with ten. Under them Childish Gambino received six nomination, Travis Scott and Kendrick Lamar tied for five nominations, and Jay-Z (credited also as "The Carters" with Beyoncé in Album of the Year, Best Collabo, Duo or Group and Song of the Year categories) with four nominations.

Cardi B was the biggest winner with four awards, including MVP of the Years and Hustler of the Year. Jay-Z and Beyoncé followed with three awards, including Album of the Year and Song of the Year. XXXTentacion was the winner of Best Hip Hop New Artist. XXXTentacion's mother accepted his award on his behalf since he had been murdered months beforehand.

== Cyphers ==
Beat and mix by DJ Mustard. Mix #3 by Erykah Badu

Cypher	Artists
1.	BlocBoy JB, Cordae, Tobe Nwigwe, Duckwrth
2.	Vic Mensa, G Herbo, Taylor Bennett, Nick Grant
3.	Bri Steves, Sharaya J, Neelam Hakeem, Chika, Erykah Badu
4.	Casanova, Phora, Shawn Smith, Flawless Real Talk, Reason

== Nominations and Winners ==
Winners highlighted in Bold

=== Best Hip Hop Video ===
- **Childish Gambino – "This Is America"**
- Cardi B featuring Bad Bunny and J Balvin – "I Like It"
- Drake – "God's Plan"
- Kendrick Lamar featuring Rihanna – "Loyalty"
- Migos featuring Drake – "Walk It Talk It"

=== Best Collab, Duo or Group ===
- **The Carters – "Apeshit"**
- 21 Savage featuring Offset and Metro Boomin – "Ric Flair Drip"
- BlocBoy JB featuring Drake – "Look Alive"
- Cardi B featuring Bad Bunny and J Balvin – "I Like It"
- Post Malone featuring 21 Savage – "Rockstar"

=== Hot Ticket Performer ===
- Childish Gambino
- **Drake**
- Kendrick Lamar
- Travis Scott

=== Lyricist of the Year ===
- Childish Gambino
- Drake
- J. Cole
- **Kendrick Lamar**
- Travis Scott

=== Video Director of the Year ===
- Benny Boom
- Dave Meyers & The Little Homies
- Director X
- Eif Rivera
- Hiro Murai
- **Karena Evans**

=== DJ of the Year ===
- Calvin Harris
- DJ Drama
- DJ Envy
- **DJ Khaled**
- DJ Mustard

=== Producer of the Year ===
- Ben Billions
- DJ Mustard
- DJ Esco
- Metro Boomin
- **Pharrell Williams**

=== MVP of the Year ===
- **Cardi B**
- Childish Gambino
- Drake
- Travis Scott
- J. Cole

=== Single of the Year ===
- **"Apeshit" – Produced by Pharrell Williams (The Carters, Quavo and Offset)**
- "God's Plan" – Produced by Cardo, Young Exclusive and Boi-1da (Drake)
- "I Like It" – Produced by Craig Kallman, JWhiteDidIt and Tainy (Cardi B featuring Bad Bunny and J Balvin)
- "Nice for What" – Produced by Murda Beatz (Drake)
- "This Is America" – Produced by Childish Gambino & Ludwig Göransson (Childish Gambino)

=== Album of the Year ===
- Cardi B – Invasion of Privacy
- Drake – Scorpion
- J. Cole – KOD
- Migos – Culture II
- **The Carters - Everything Is Love**

=== Best New Hip Hop Artist ===
- **XXXTentacion**
- Trippie Redd
- BlocBoy JB
- Juice Wrld
- Lil Baby
- Rich the Kid

=== Hustler of the Year ===
- **Cardi B**
- Drake
- DJ Khaled
- JAY-Z
- Kendrick Lamar
- Travis Scott

=== Made-You-Look Award (Best Hip Hop Style) ===
- Nicki Minaj
- Remy Ma
- Migos
- **Cardi B**
- Travis Scott

=== Best Mixtape ===
- **BlocBoy JB– "Simi"**
- Juicy J – "Shut Da F* Up"
- Lil Wayne – "Dedication 6: Reloaded"
- Zoey Dollaz – "Sorry Not Sorry"
- Future –" Beast Mode 2"

=== Sweet 16: Best Featured Verse ===
- 21 Savage– "Bartier Cardi" (Cardi B featuring 21 Savage )
- **Cardi B– "MotorSport" (Migos featuring Cardi B and Nicki Minaj)**
- Drake– "Look Alive" (BlocBoy JB– featuring Drake)
- Kendrick Lamar– "New Freezer" (Rich the Kid featuring Kendrick Lamar)
- Nicki Minaj– "Big Bank" (YG feat. 2 Chainz, Big Sean & Nicki Minaj)

=== Impact Track ===
- **Childish Gambino – "This Is America"**
- Dej Loaf & Leon Bridges – "Liberated"
- Lecrae featuring Tori Kelly– "I'll Find You"
- Meek Mill featuring Miguel – "Stay Woke "
- N.E.R.D featuring Future – "1000"

=== I Am Hip Hop Icon ===
Lil Wayne
