= 4:44 Tour =

2017 concert tour by Jay-Z

- Continental tour by Jay-Z
- Promotional poster
- Location: North America
- Associated album: 4:44
- Start date: October 27, 2017
- End date: December 21, 2017
- Legs: 1
- No. of shows: 33
- Box office: $48.7 million ($62.47 million in 2024 dollars)

Jay-Z concert chronology
- On the Run Tour (2014); 4:44 Tour (2017); OTR II Tour (2018)

The Tour Jay:Z 4:44 or simply 4:44 Tour was a concert tour by American rapper Jay-Z, in support of his thirteenth studio album 4:44 (2017). The tour began in Anaheim at the Honda Center on October 27, 2017, and concluded on December 21, 2017, in Inglewood at The Forum. Vic Mensa was the opening act for the whole tour.

Jay Z's North American run of his 4:44 Tour grossed $48,698,354 over the course of 32 dates. 426,441 tickets were sold in that span, with about $1.5 million grossed per show.

== Background and development ==
On July 10, 2017, Jay-Z announced 32 tour dates across North America.

== Set list ==
This set list is representative of the show on November 3, 2017 in Phoenix. It does not represent all concerts for the duration of the tour.

1. "Kill Jay-Z"
2. "No Church in the Wild"
3. "Lucifer"
4. "D'Evils"
5. "Heart of the City (Ain't No Love)"
6. "Run This Town"
7. "FuckWithMeYouKnowIGotIt"
8. "Beach Is Better"
9. "4:44"
10. "Bam"
11. "Jigga My Nigga"
12. "Izzo (H.O.V.A.)"
13. "Dirt off Your Shoulder"
14. "On to the Next One"
15. "I Just Wanna Love U (Give It 2 Me)"
16. "Public Service Announcement"
17. "99 Problems"
18. "Big Pimpin'"
19. "The Story of O.J."
20. "Niggas in Paris"
21. "Where I'm From"
22. "Empire State of Mind"
23. "Blues Freestyle"
24. "Hard Knock Life (Ghetto Anthem)"
25. "Smile"

Encore

26. "Numb/Encore"

== Shows ==
List of concerts, showing date, city, country, venue, opening acts, tickets sold, number of available tickets and amount of gross revenue
Date	City	Country	Venue	Opening act	Attendance	Revenue
North America
October 27, 2017	Anaheim	United States	Honda Center	Vic Mensa	12,153 / 14,933	$1,228,306
October 28, 2017	Las Vegas	United States	T-Mobile Arena	Vic Mensa	—	—
November 1, 2017	Fresno	United States	Save Mart Center	Vic Mensa	—	—
November 3, 2017	Phoenix	United States	Talking Stick Resort Arena	Vic Mensa	—	—
November 5, 2017	Denver	United States	Pepsi Center	Vic Mensa	—	—
November 7, 2017	Dallas	United States	American Airlines Center	Vic Mensa	14,497 / 15,955	$1,330,471
November 8, 2017	Houston	United States	Toyota Center	Vic Mensa	—	—
November 9, 2017	New Orleans	United States	Smoothie King Center	Vic Mensa	12,731 / 14,812	$1,072,797
November 11, 2017	Orlando	United States	Amway Center	Vic Mensa	—	—
November 12, 2017	Miami	United States	American Airlines Arena	Vic Mensa	15,735 / 15,735	$1,770,249
November 14, 2017	Atlanta	United States	Philips Arena	Vic Mensa	14,118 / 15,039	$1,832,255
November 15, 2017	Nashville	United States	Bridgestone Arena	Vic Mensa	14,128 / 14,128	$1,064,008
November 16, 2017	Charlotte	United States	Spectrum Center	Vic Mensa	15,558 / 15,558	$1,563,821
November 18, 2017	Detroit	United States	Little Caesars Arena	Vic Mensa	—	—
November 19, 2017	Cleveland	United States	Quicken Loans Arena	Vic Mensa	—	—
November 21, 2017	Montreal	Canada	Bell Centre	Vic Mensa	—	—
November 22, 2017	Toronto	Canada	Air Canada Centre	Vic Mensa	25,270 / 25,270	$2,301,650
November 23, 2017	Toronto	Canada	Air Canada Centre	Vic Mensa	25,270 / 25,270	$2,301,650
November 25, 2017	Boston	United States	TD Garden	Vic Mensa	—	—
November 26, 2017	Brooklyn	United States	Barclays Center	Vic Mensa	—	—
November 27, 2017	Brooklyn	United States	Barclays Center	Vic Mensa	—	—
November 29, 2017	Washington, D.C.	United States	Capital One Arena	Vic Mensa	18,147 / 18,147	$2,199,885
December 1, 2017	Philadelphia	United States	Wells Fargo Center	Vic Mensa	—	—
December 2, 2017	Uniondale	United States	Nassau Veterans Memorial Coliseum	Vic Mensa	13,292 / 13,292	$1,315,634
December 5, 2017	Chicago	United States	United Center	Vic Mensa	—	—
December 9, 2017	Edmonton	Canada	Rogers Place	Vic Mensa	—	—
December 11, 2017	Vancouver	Canada	Rogers Arena	Vic Mensa	14,386 / 14,933	$1,160,682
December 13, 2017	Seattle	United States	KeyArena	Vic Mensa	9,200	$862,000
December 14, 2017	Portland	United States	Moda Center	Vic Mensa	10,840 / 13,548	$803,170
December 16, 2017	Oakland	United States	Oracle Arena	Vic Mensa	14,853 / 14,853	$1,511,245
December 17, 2017	Sacramento	United States	Golden 1 Center	Vic Mensa	11,459 / 15,370	$954,552
December 19, 2017	San Diego	United States	Viejas Arena	Vic Mensa	—	—
December 21, 2017	Inglewood	United States	The Forum	Vic Mensa	16,084 / 16,084	$2,012,730
Total					426,441	$48,698,354
