= Contemporary jazz =

Contemporary jazz may refer to:

- Smooth jazz, a musical genre that evolved from a blend of jazz fusion and easy-listening pop
- Jazz fusion, a musical genre combining rock, funk, and rhythm and blues
- Contemporary Jazz (Branford Marsalis album), a 2000 album by the Branford Marsalis Quartet
