= The Carters =

Musical duo of Beyoncé and Jay-Z

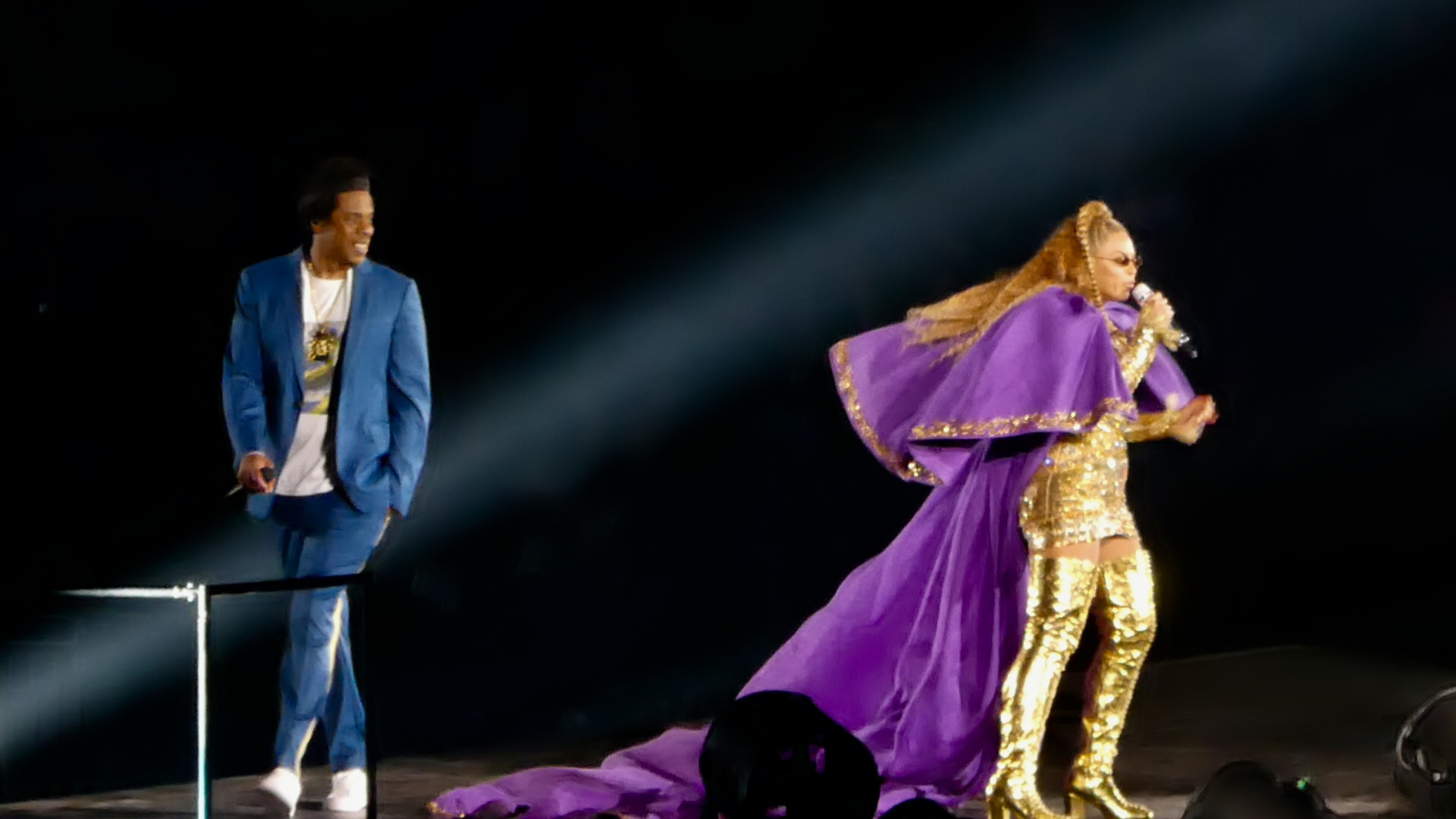
- The Carters performing at the On the Run II Tour in 2018

Background information
- Origin: U.S.
- Genres: R&B; hip hop
- Years active: 2002–present
- Labels: Parkwood; Columbia; Roc Nation
- Members: Beyoncé; Jay-Z

The Carters are an American musical hip hop and R&B superduo consisting of singer Beyoncé and rapper Jay-Z, who have been married since 2008. Outside of the Carters, the couple has also frequently collaborated in recordings and songwriting. Their first album and single under the moniker, Everything Is Love and "Apeshit", were released on June 16, 2018. The album was certified gold by the Recording Industry Association of America (RIAA). The Carters have performed on two co-headlining concert tours, On the Run Tour (2014) and On the Run II Tour (2018).

As soloists, Beyoncé and Jay-Z have released a number of recording collaborations, beginning with the 2002 single "'03 Bonnie & Clyde". The couple had their first Billboard Hot 100 number one single the following year with "Crazy in Love". As songwriters, they have co-written the number one hits "Crazy in Love", "Baby Boy", "Savage (Remix)", and "Break My Soul".

== History ==
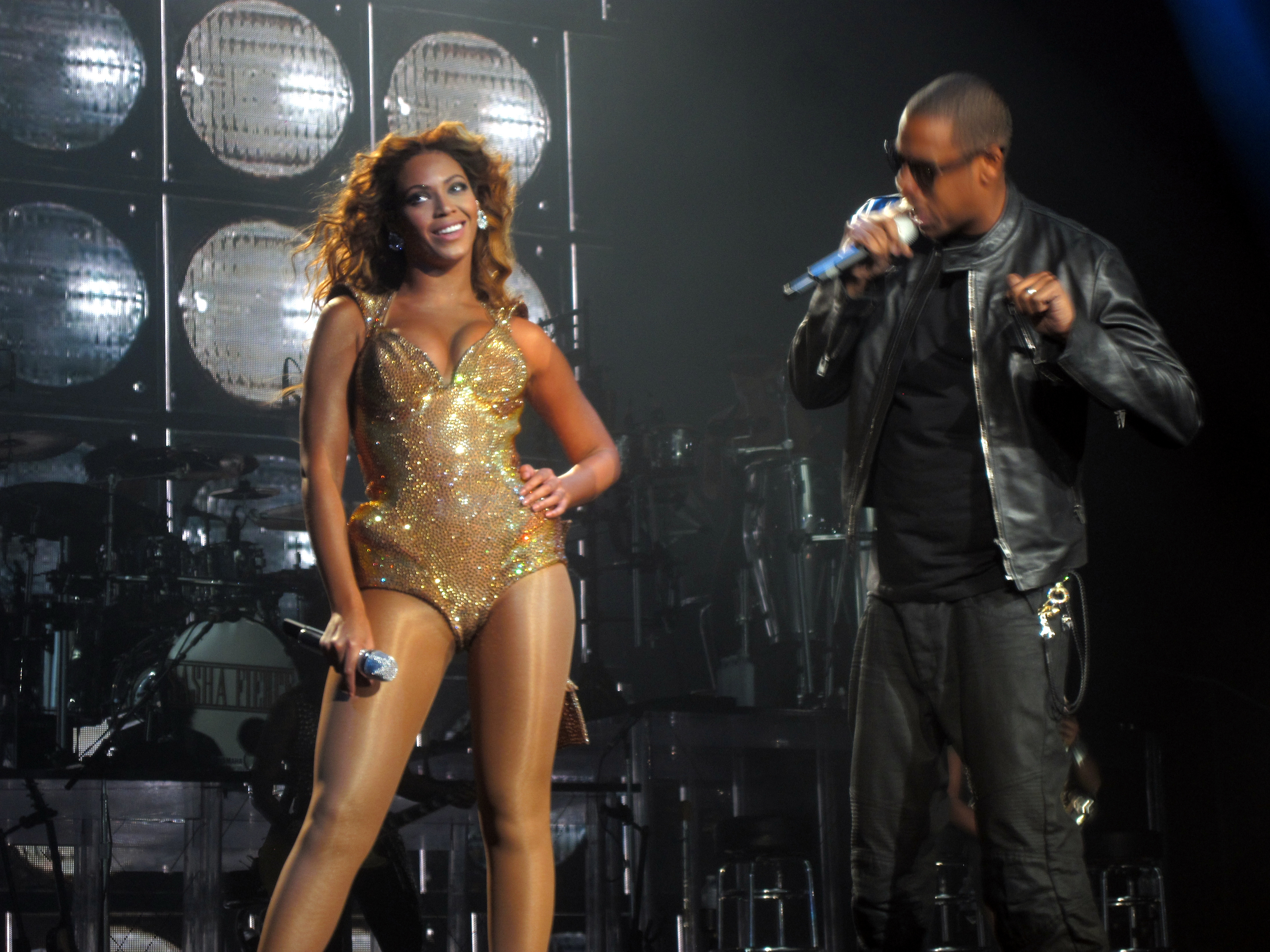
The Carters performing in 2009

=== 2002–present: Recording and songwriting collaborations ===
After working together on the music video for Amil's song "I Got That" in 2000, the couple went on to make their first recording collaboration with "'03 Bonnie & Clyde", which peaked at number 4 on the Billboard Hot 100. The duo co-wrote five tracks on Beyoncé's debut album, Dangerously in Love (2003), including its lead single "Crazy in Love", which topped the charts in the US. This was followed by two collaborations on her follow-up, B'Day (2006), which spawned their single "Déjà Vu", which peaked at number four in the US and number one in the UK.

Following several of Beyoncé's appearances on Jay-Z's records Kingdom Come and Watch the Throne, the duo released the number two US hit, "Drunk in Love", from Beyoncé's 2013 self-titled album. Beyoncé appeared as a vocalist on two songs on Jay-Z's Magna Carta Holy Grail (2013). The couple later released two collaborations with DJ Khaled, and worked on The Lion King: The Gift (2019), which Beyoncé curated and executive-produced.

The couple has also collaborated in songwriting, typically on each other's songs, and have both received Grammy Awards as songwriters for "Crazy in Love", "Drunk in Love", and "Savage (Remix)". Jay-Z has writing credits on six Beyoncé albums, namely Dangerously in Love, B'Day, Beyoncé, The Lion King: The Gift, Renaissance (2022), and Cowboy Carter (2024).

=== 2014; 2018: as The Carters and Everything Is Love ===
In 2014 and 2018, The Carters embarked on two co-headlining concert tours, On the Run Tour and On the Run II Tour. On June 16, 2018, during a London stop of their On the Run II Tour, The Carters premiered the music video for "Apeshit". Following the conclusion of the video, the words "ALBUM OUT NOW" appeared on the screen. Everything Is Love was released exclusively on Tidal for streaming and digital download, and was later made available across all other platforms. The record received positive reviews and debuted at number two on the Billboard 200. The album was later ranked as one of the best albums of the year by critics and won a Grammy Award for Best Urban Contemporary Album.

== Discography ==
=== Studio albums ===
Title	Details	Peak chart positions									Sales	Certifications
Title	Details	US	AUS	CAN	GER	IRE	NLD	NZ	SWI	UK	Sales	Certifications
Everything Is Love	Released: June 16, 2018; Label: Parkwood, Roc Nation; Formats: CD, streaming, digital download	2	6	4	23	10	4	12	5	5	US: 70,000	RIAA: Gold; BPI: Silver

=== Singles ===
Title	Year	Peak chart positions								Certifications	Album
Title	Year	US	US R&B/ HH	AUS	CAN	IRE	NLD	SWI	UK	Certifications	Album
"Apeshit"	2018	13	9	51	24	33	59	69	33	RIAA: Platinum; BPI: Gold; MC: Platinum	Everything Is Love

=== Promotional single ===
Title	Year
"Salud!" (Tidal exclusive)	2018

=== Other charted songs ===
Title	Year	Peak chart positions			Certifications	Album
Title	Year	US	US R&B/ HH	UK	Certifications	Album
"Nice" (original or featuring Pharrell Williams)	2018	95	48	—		Everything Is Love
"Boss"	2018	77	38	87	RIAA: Gold	Everything Is Love
"Summer"	2018	84	42	96		Everything Is Love
"Black Effect"	2018	— (Note: "Black Effect" did not enter the Billboard Hot 100, but peaked at number 20 on the Bubbling Under Hot 100 Singles chart.)	—	—		Everything Is Love
"LoveHappy"	2018	— (Note: "LoveHappy" did not enter the Billboard Hot 100, but peaked at number 21 on the Bubbling Under Hot 100 Singles chart.)	—			Everything Is Love
"Friends"	2018	99	— (Note: "Friends" did not enter the Billboard Hot R&B/Hip Hop Songs, but reached number 1 on the Bubbling Under R&B/Hip-Hop Singles extension chart.)	—		Everything Is Love
"—" denotes items which failed to chart.

=== Recording collaborations ===
Title	Year	Artist(s)	Also co-writers	Album
"'03 Bonnie & Clyde"	2002	Jay-Z featuring Beyoncé		The Blueprint 2: The Gift & The Curse
"Baby Freestyle"	2003	Jay-Z (Beyoncé on additional vocals)		The S. Carter Collection
"Crazy in Love"	2003	Beyoncé featuring Jay-Z	Yes	Dangerously in Love
"That's How You Like It"	2003	Beyoncé featuring Jay-Z	Yes	Dangerously in Love
"Déjà Vu"	2006	Beyoncé featuring Jay-Z	Yes	B'Day
"Upgrade U"	2006	Beyoncé featuring Jay-Z	Yes	B'Day
"Hollywood"	2006	Jay-Z featuring Beyoncé		Kingdom Come
"Can't Knock the Hustle" (Live)	2006	Jay-Z featuring Beyoncé		Kingdom Come
"Beach Chair"	2006	Jay-Z featuring Chris Martin (Beyoncé on additional vocals)		Kingdom Come
"Pray"	2007	Jay-Z (Beyoncé on additional vocals)		American Gangster
"Roc Boys (And the Winner Is)..."	2007	Jay-Z (Beyoncé on additional vocals)		American Gangster
"Venus vs. Mars"	2009	Jay-Z (Beyoncé on additional vocals)		The Blueprint 3
"Lift Off"	2011	Jay-Z and Kanye West featuring Beyoncé		Watch the Throne
"Young Forever" (Live)	2012	Jay-Z featuring Beyoncé		Live in Brooklyn
"Part II (On the Run)"	2013	Jay-Z featuring Beyoncé	Yes	Magna Carta Holy Grail
"Tom Ford"	2013	Jay-Z (Beyoncé on additional vocals (Note: On "Tom Ford" Beyoncé was credited as Third Ward Trill.))		Magna Carta Holy Grail
"BBC"	2013	Jay-Z (Beyoncé on additional vocals)		Magna Carta Holy Grail
"Drunk in Love"	2013	Beyoncé featuring Jay-Z	Yes	Beyoncé
"Shining"	2017	DJ Khaled featuring Jay-Z and Beyoncé	Yes	Grateful
"Family Feud"	2018	Jay-Z featuring Beyoncé	Yes	4:44
"Top Off"	2018	DJ Khaled featuring Jay-Z, Future and Beyoncé	Yes	Father of Asahd
"Mood 4 Eva"	2019	Beyoncé, Jay-Z and Childish Gambino featuring Oumou Sangaré	Yes	The Lion King: The Gift
"Sorry Not Sorry"	2021	DJ Khaled featuring Nas, Jay-Z, James Fauntleroy and Beyoncé (Note: On "Sorry Not Sorry" Beyoncé was credited as Harmonies by the Hive.)	Yes	Khaled Khaled
"Morning Dew (Donk)" (Remix)	2026	Beyoncé featuring Jay-Z	Yes	—N/a

=== Songwriting collaborations ===
Title	Year	Artist(s)	Album
"Baby Boy"	2003	Beyoncé featuring Sean Paul	Dangerously in Love
"Hip Hop Star"	2003	Beyoncé featuring Big Boi and Sleepy Brown	Dangerously in Love
"Yes"	2003	Beyoncé	Dangerously in Love
"Lose My Breath"	2004	Destiny's Child	Destiny Fulfilled
"Kitty Kat"	2006	Beyoncé	B'Day
"Welcome to Hollywood"	2007	Beyoncé	B'Day: Deluxe Edition
"ManyFacedGod"	2017	Jay-Z featuring James Blake	4:44
"Brown Skin Girl"	2019	Beyoncé, Saint Jhn and Wizkid featuring Blue Ivy Carter	The Lion King: The Gift
"Savage (Remix)"	2020	Megan Thee Stallion featuring Beyoncé	Good News
"Black Parade"	2020	Beyoncé	The Lion King: The Gift (Deluxe Edition)
"What It Feels Like"	2021	Nipsey Hussle and Jay-Z	Judas and the Black Messiah
"Break My Soul"	2022	Beyoncé	Renaissance
"Alien Superstar"	2022	Beyoncé	Renaissance
"America Has a Problem"	2022	Beyoncé	Renaissance
"Ameriican Requiem"	2024	Beyoncé	Cowboy Carter
"Daughter"	2024	Beyoncé	Cowboy Carter
"Ya Ya"	2024	Beyoncé	Cowboy Carter
"Spaghettii"	2024	Beyoncé, Linda Martell and Shaboozey	Cowboy Carter
"Levii's Jeans"	2024	Beyoncé and Post Malone	Cowboy Carter
"Sweet / Honey / Buckiin'"	2024	Beyoncé and Shaboozey	Cowboy Carter

== Awards and nominations ==
Year	Ceremony	Work	Nomination	Result
2018	BBC Radio 1's Teen Awards	Themselves	Best International Group	Nominated
2018	BET Hip Hop Awards	Everything Is Love	Album of the Year	Won
2018	BET Hip Hop Awards	"Apeshit"	Song of the Year	Won
2018	BET Hip Hop Awards	"Apeshit"	Best Collaboration	Won
2018	Clio Awards	"Apeshit"	Best Music Video	Won
2018	Camerimage Awards	"Apeshit"	Best Music Video	Nominated
2018	Camerimage Awards	"Apeshit"	Best Cinematography in a Music Video	Nominated
2018	iHeartRadio MMVAs	"Apeshit"	Fan Fave Video	Nominated
2018	iHeartRadio MMVAs	"Apeshit"	Best Direction	Nominated
2018	iHeartRadio MMVAs	Themselves	Best Hip Hop Artist or Group	Nominated
2018	Hiphop.de Awards	Themselves	Best Live Act International	Won
2018	Los 40 Music Awards	"Apeshit"	International Video of the Year	Nominated
2018	MTV Europe Music Awards	"Apeshit"	Best Video	Nominated
2018	MTV Europe Music Awards	Themselves	Best Live Act	Nominated
2018	MTV Video Music Awards	"Apeshit"	Video of the Year	Nominated
2018	MTV Video Music Awards	"Apeshit"	Best Collaboration	Nominated
2018	MTV Video Music Awards	"Apeshit"	Best Hip-Hop Video	Nominated
2018	MTV Video Music Awards	"Apeshit"	Best Art Direction	Won
2018	MTV Video Music Awards	"Apeshit"	Best Choreography	Nominated
2018	MTV Video Music Awards	"Apeshit"	Best Cinematography	Won
2018	MTV Video Music Awards	"Apeshit"	Best Direction	Nominated
2018	MTV Video Music Awards	"Apeshit"	Best Editing	Nominated
2018	Soul Train Music Awards	"Apeshit"	Rhythm & Bars Award	Nominated
2018	UK Music Video Awards	"Apeshit"	Best International Urban Video	Nominated
2019	Grammy Awards	"Apeshit"	Best Music Video	Nominated
2019	Grammy Awards	Everything Is Love	Best Urban Contemporary Album	Won
2019	Grammy Awards	"Summer"	Best R&B Performance	Nominated
2019	Swedish GAFFA-Prisen	Themselves	Best Foreign Group	Nominated
2019	Swedish GAFFA-Prisen	"Apeshit"	International Hit of the Year	Nominated
2019	Swedish GAFFA-Prisen	Everything Is Love	International Album of the Year	Nominated
2019	Norwegian GAFFA-Prisen	Themselves	Best Foreign Group	Nominated
2019	Brit Awards	Themselves	International Group	Won
2019	50th NAACP Image Awards	"Apeshit"	Outstanding Music Video/Visual Album	Nominated
2019	50th NAACP Image Awards	Everything Is Love	Outstanding Album	Nominated
2019	50th NAACP Image Awards	Everything Is Love	Outstanding Duo, Group or Collaboration	Nominated
2019	Billboard Music Awards	Themselves	Top Touring Artist	Nominated
2019	Billboard Music Awards	Themselves	Top Rap Tour	Won
2019	Billboard Music Awards	Themselves	Top R&B Tour	Won

== Live performances ==
- Global Citizen Festival: Mandela 100 at FNB Stadium in Johannesburg, South Africa (2 December 2018)

=== Tours ===
- On the Run Tour (2014)
- On the Run II Tour (2018)

== See also ==
- List of musical supergroups
- List of songwriter collaborations
