= Homecoming: The Live Album =

Live album by Beyoncé
- Released: April 17, 2019
- Recorded: April 14 and 21, 2018
- Venues: Empire Polo Club, Indio, California
- Studios: NRG, Los Angeles, California
- Length: 108:57
- Labels: Parkwood; Columbia
- Producers: Beyoncé; Derek Dixie

Beyoncé chronology
Everything Is Love (2018)	Homecoming: The Live Album (2019)	The Lion King: The Gift (2019)

Homecoming: The Live Album is the fifth live album by American singer and songwriter Beyoncé, recorded from her two headlining Coachella performances in April 2018. It was released on April 17, 2019. The album accompanied a concert film documenting the performance, Homecoming: A Film by Beyoncé, which premiered the same day on the streaming platform Netflix. The album was also released on vinyl, on December 4, 2020.

Recorded in April 2018 at the Coachella Valley Music and Arts Festival in Indio, California, the album features the entirety of Beyoncé's performance at the festival, which has since been described as "historic" by a number of music critics and media outlets. Two bonus studio tracks – a cover of Maze's song "Before I Let Go" and "I Been On" – follow the live recording, bringing the album's length to just short of two hours.

== Background and recording ==
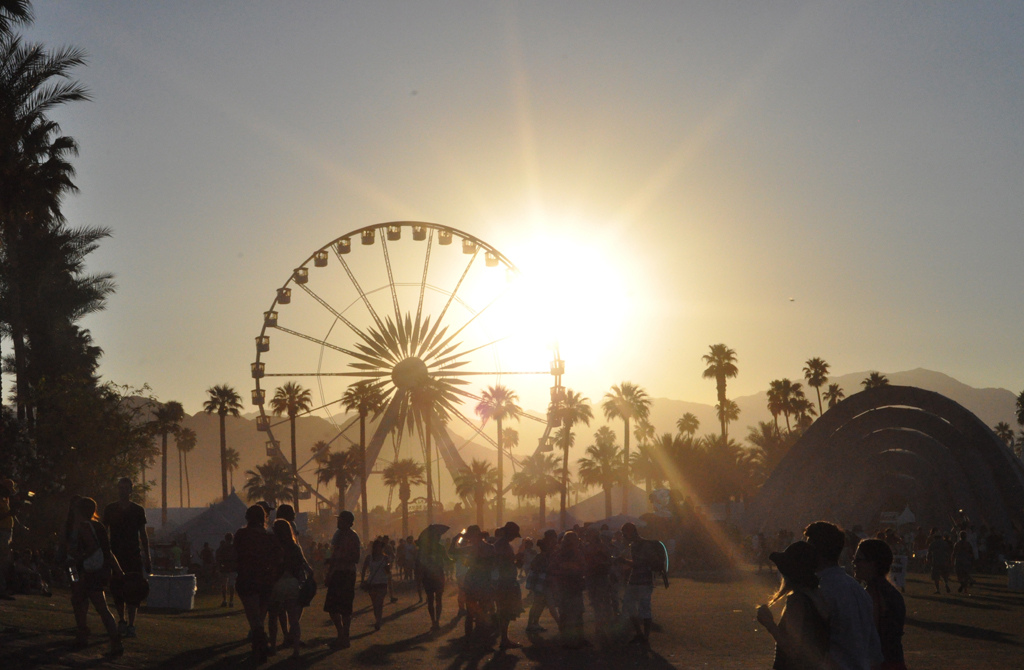
The album was recorded during Beyoncé's 2018 Coachella performance, which was described by many media outlets as historic.

On January 4, 2017, Beyoncé was announced as a headlining act for the April 2017 Coachella festival. However, on February 23, 2017, she postponed her performance until the following year, due to doctor's concerns regarding her pregnancy with twins (born in June 2017). Playing her rescheduled dates in 2018, Beyoncé became the first black woman ever to headline the festival. In its nearly twenty years of existence, the festival has only had two other women solo headliners, Lady Gaga (who replaced Beyoncé in 2017) and Björk (2002 and 2007). Even prior to Beyoncé's performance, the nickname "Beychella" emerged for the 2018 festival.

For her April 14 and 21, 2018, performances, some 100 dancers as well as her sister Solange, her husband Jay-Z, and her former girl group Destiny's Child joined Beyoncé on stage. She played a 26-song set to 125,000 concert-goers in attendance as well as millions watching via the live-stream on YouTube and subsequent playback. The set sampled Malcolm X and Nina Simone among others. The performance has been credited as paying a strong tribute to the HBCU experience.

A full marching band played during much of the set, accompanied by majorette dancers. Writing for Mic.com, Natelegé Whaley stated that the band consisted of members from various HBCUs and played samples of songs that are often played at an HBCU such as "Swag Surf", "Broccoli", and "Back that Azz Up", along with samples of gospel and go-go music. Journalists also noted that the set incorporated various aspects of black Greek life, such as a step show along with strolling by probates (pledges). Reviewers noted the influence of black feminism on Beyoncé's performance, including her sampling of Nigerian author Chimamanda Ngozi Adichie's TED Talk on feminism and the aforementioned appearances on stage of former collaborators Kelly Rowland and Michelle Williams of Destiny's Child as well as her sister Solange; writing in Cosmopolitan, Brittney Cooper read Beyoncé's decision to involve these black women in the landmark performance as a gesture of sisterhood.

== Critical reception ==
Professional ratings
Aggregate scores
Source	Rating
Metacritic	95/100
Review scores
Source	Rating
AllMusic	4.5/5 stars
HipHopDX	4.8/5
Irish Examiner	10/10
Pitchfork	9.3/10
PopMatters	7/10
Rolling Stone	4.5/5 stars
Tom Hull – on the Web	B+

Homecoming: The Live Album was met with widespread critical acclaim. At Metacritic, it received a weighted average score of 95, based on 6 reviews.

Writing for Los Angeles Times, Sonaiya Kelley named Homecoming: The Live Album as "one of the greatest live albums ever", with Makeda Easter adding that the "album is a piece of black history". Bernadette Giacomazzo of HipHopDX called the album an "artistically-sound triumph" as well as a "cultural touchstone and, quite possibly, the live album of a generation". Giacomazzo describes that what makes the album "so classic is that Beyoncé makes clear" that she is "Black Excellence, personified — and in her performance, she makes the audience believe that they, too, are Black Excellence personified".

Writing for Rolling Stone, Brittany Spanos described the album as "triumphant" and "awe-inspiring". She noticed that the live album successfully felt like a greatest hits collection (reimagined to fit the college homecoming theme and marching band) due to its lack of connection to any specific album. In a review for Pitchfork, Danielle Jackson praised the album as a "stunning" preservation of Beyoncé's Coachella performance, commending its focus on historical black artists. She wrote that the performance showcased Beyoncé at her vocal and physical peak, while celebrating "complex, diasporic blackness". She also applauded the album's mixing and engineering, and concluded that the "wondrous, rapturous collage" could serve as one of Beyoncé's most important albums. AllMusic's reviewer Neil Z. Yeung had similar sentiments, concluding that "Homecoming is a master class in technical prowess, crowd pleasing, and soulful substance. Channeling the spirit of African queen Nefertiti (whose image she adopted for this show), Beyoncé proved to be a ruler in her own right, lording over Coachella for two career-defining nights."

== Accolades ==
Awards
Year	Organization	Award	Result	Ref.
2020	BET Awards	Album of the Year	Nominated	
2020	Billboard Music Awards	Top R&B Album	Nominated	
2020	NAACP Image Awards	Outstanding Album	Won	

Year-end lists
Publication	List	Rank	Ref.
Billboard	50 Best Albums of 2019: Staff Picks	12	
GQ (Russia)	The 20 Best Albums of 2019	—N/a	
GQ (US)	21 best albums of 2019	—N/a	
Idolator	The 20 Best Albums of 2019	2	
Laut (Germany)	Die 50 Alben des Jahres (2019)	31	
Nöjesguiden (Sweden)	ÅRETS UTLÄNDSKA ALBUM 2019	34	
NPR (Ken Tucker)	Top 10 Albums Of The Year	8	
People	The 10 Best Albums of 2019	6	
Pitchfork	The 50 Best Albums of 2019	14	
USA Today	The Best Albums of 2019	7	
US Weekly	The 50 Best Albums of 2019	10	
Vibe	The 30 Best Albums of 2019	—N/a	
The Washington Post	Top 10 albums of 2019	6	
Wired	The 7 Best Albums of 2019	Honorable Mention	

All-time & miscellaneous lists
Organization	Country	Accolade	Ranked	Year	Source
The Guardian	United Kingdom	10 of the Best Ever Live Albums	—N/a	2021	
Paste	United States	12 Great Live Albums to Remind You What Concerts Were Like	—N/a	2020	
Uproxx	United States	The Best Live Albums of All Time	33	2020	
USA Today	United States	20 Essential Live Albums to Stream	—N/a	2020	
Treblezine	United States	The 50 Best Live Albums	—N/a	2023	
Variety	United States	Give These 50 Live Albums a Listen	—N/a	2020	

== Commercial performance ==
Homecoming: The Live Album debuted at number seven on the US Billboard 200 with 38,000 album-equivalent units (including 14,000 in album sales) from only two days of tracking activity. It is Beyoncé's eighth solo US top 10 album. The following week, it rose to number four, earning 57,000 album-equivalent units (including 8,000 album sales). After the album's release, the studio version of "Before I Let Go" peaked at number 17 on the Billboard R&B/Hip-Hop Digital Song Sales Chart as well as number 3 on the Billboard R&B Digital Song Sales Chart. In the beginning of May, "Before I Let Go" debuted at number 75 in the US Billboard Hot 100 chart issue dated May 4, 2019. It peaked at number 65 in the US Billboard Hot 100 issue dated May 11, 2019.

== Legacy ==
Homecoming: The Live Album has been said to have set a trend of musicians releasing albums with complementary film projects on Netflix. Lonely Island's The Unauthorized Bash Brothers Experience, Thom Yorke's Anima, Sturgill Simpson's Sound & Fury, and Kid Cudi's Entergalactic are all cited as examples of projects that have followed the precedent that Homecoming: The Live Album set. Sheldon Pearce for Pitchfork wrote that Homecoming kickstarted the "ongoing uprising" where "black women have been demanding ownership of their outsized impact on culture"; Jamila Woods' LEGACY! LEGACY! and Rapsody's Eve, as well as exhibitions such as "Black Women: Power and Grace" and "Posing Modernity", are mentioned as later works that constitute the "formative syllabus" that started with Homecoming.

Frankie Beverly, who originally sang "Before I Let Go", praised Beyoncé's cover of the song in Homecoming: The Live Album, saying "It's a blessing... She's done so much, this is one of the high points of my life." R&B legend Anita Baker also commented on Beyoncé's cover, describing Beyoncé as "Queen keeping R&B alive". Rolling Stone reported that the famed New Orleans band Rebirth Brass Band "gained new admirers" after Beyoncé sampled their song "Do Whatcha Wanna" on the track "Welcome".

Music director Derek Dixie called working on Homecoming: The Live Album a "blessing", adding that being nominated for an Emmy Award means that "I've kind of accomplished something for the home team and family." Dixie also said "It was just months and months of prep work, making it sound authentic. She has tons and tons of classic records that when putting the show together, you have to maintain the classic feel of the record but make it feel like you're in a stadium at homecoming."

A 9-feet-tall statue of Beyoncé as seen on the Homecoming: The Live Album cover was unveiled at Mercedes-Benz Arena in Berlin.

The "GO FIGURE" data visualization series explored the words and phrases that Beyoncé repeated throughout Homecoming and their impact on the viewer, with Semmi W. writing that Beyoncé "plants seeds of positive self-talk rather than doubt. Whether I was catching the subway or cleaning my apartment, her edict between my ears this weekend was cause for royal jubilee. In under two hours, Queen Bey kept declaring that we are all enough. In 162 sentences she told us to love, hustle, and claim what's yours. She repeatedly affirmed my intrinsic worth as a black girl-turned-adult."

Through the tribute to HBCU culture in Homecoming: The Live Album (such as on the track "So Much Damn Swag"), Beyoncé increased people's interest in HBCUs. Students cited Homecoming as the reason that they were considering attending HBCUs, and Google searches for "HBCU" reached an all-time high after Homecoming: The Live Album was released.

== Track listing ==
- Credits adapted from Beyoncé's official website.
- All songs are produced by Beyoncé and Derek Dixie, except "Lift Ev'ry Voice and Sing", "So Much Damn Swag (Interlude)", "Bug a Boo Roll Call (Interlude)", "Lift Ev'ry Voice and Sing (Blue's Version)", which credit no producers, and the bonus tracks, "Before I Let Go" and "I Been On", that were produced by Tay Keith & Beyoncé and Timbaland & Beyoncé, respectively.

Homecoming track listing
No.	Title	Writer(s)	Length
1.	"Welcome" (announced by Slater Thorpe)	Beyoncé; Quincy Jones; Charles Emanuel Smalls; Michael Cooper; Asheton Hogan; Kendrick Lamar Duckworth; Anthony Tiffith; Michael Williams; Shawn Carter; Elbernita Clark; Ernest Dion Wilson	3:16
2.	"Crazy in Love"	Beyoncé; S. Carter; Richard Harrison; Eugene Record; Dwayne Carter; Terius Gray; Byron O. Thomas; Timothy Mosley; Sean Michael Anderson; Stanley Kirk Burrell; Ernest Clark; James Johnson; Alonzo Miller; Marcos Palacios	2:47
3.	"Freedom"	Jonathan Coffer; Beyoncé; Carla Williams; Arrow Benjamin; Duckworth; Frank Tirado; Alan Lomax; John Lomax Sr.; Calvin Broadus; Awood Johnson; Craig Lawson; Corey Miller	1:54
4.	"Lift Ev'ry Voice and Sing"	James Weldon Johnson	2:09
5.	"Formation"	Beyoncé; M. Williams; Khalif Brown; Hogan	4:23
6.	"So Much Damn Swag" (interlude)	Beyoncé	0:59
7.	"Sorry"	Diana Gordon; Sean "MeLo-X" Rhoden; Beyoncé; Scott Storch; Robert Waller	6:34
8.	"Kitty Kat"	Pharrell Williams; S. Carter; Beyoncé	0:42
9.	"Bow Down"	Gordon; Rhoden; Beyoncé; S. Carter; Kirk Andre Bennett; Miguel Collins; Mike Dean; Bobby Dixon; Ebony Naomi Oshunrinde; Jacques Webster; Demacio Castellon; Chris Godbey; Leslie Jerome Harmon; Garland Waverly Mosley Jr.; Mosley	1:28
10.	"I Been On"	Beyoncé; Jamal Jones; Mosley; Jonathan "Anonymous" Solonne-Myvett; Theron Thomas; Timothy Thomas; Sonny Corey Uwaezuoke; Craig Bazile; Percy Miller; Mia Young	2:40
11.	"Drunk in Love"	S. Carter; Rasool Díaz; Noel Fisher; Harmon; Beyoncé; Mosley; Andre Proctor; Brian Soko; James Edward Fauntleroy II; Godbey; Miguel Jontel Pimentel; Justin Timberlake; James H. Shelton; Alviticus Bryant; Kevin Michael Erondu; Michael Gordon; Jared Rice; Sedarius Spearman; Keishaun Patrick Watts; Amund Bjørklund; Mikkel Eriksen; Tor Hermansen; Espen Lind; Shaffer Smith	4:14
12.	"Diva"	Shondrae Crawford; Sean Garrett Hamler; Beyoncé; Aubrey Graham; Anthony Palman; Matthew Samuels; Noah Shebib; Odis Flores; S. Carter; Mosley	2:46
13.	"Flawless" / "Feeling Myself"	Beyoncé; Chauncey Hollis; Raymond Martin; Rashad Muhammad; Terius Nash; Onika Maraj; Solána Rowe; Bennett; Collins; Dean; Dixon; Oshunrinde; Webster; Sharon Kaye Abshire; Graham; Bernard Joseph Gerard; Shebib; Marvin Thomas; Justin Garner; Antoine McColister; William Roberts; Nayvadius Wilburn; M. Williams; Jordan Carter; Jordan Jenks; Symere Woods; Marquis King; Manuel Alvarenga; André Benjamin; Patrick Brown; Antwan Patton	3:58
14.	"Top Off"	S. Carter; Wilburn; Denisia Andrews; Brittany Coney; Khaled Khaled; Beyoncé; Joe Zarillo	1:23
15.	"7/11"	Adrian Bruesch; Fisher; Beyoncé; Sidney Swift; Graham; Leland Tyler Wayne; Wilburn	3:04
16.	"Bug a Boo Roll Call" (interlude)	Beyoncé; Burt Bacharach; Jahron Brathwaite; Ingrid Burley; S. Carter; Hal David; Floyd Nathaniel Hills; Khaled; Ian Dench; Eriksen; Amanda Ghost; Hermansen; Makeba Riddick; Chad Hugo; P. Williams	1:58
17.	"Party"	André Benjamin; Jeffrey Bhasker; Douglas Davis; Beyoncé; Dexter Mills; Ricky Walters; Kanye West	3:48
18.	"Don't Hurt Yourself"	Jack White; Beyoncé; D. Gordon; James Page; Robert Plant; John Paul Jones; John Bonham	4:17
19.	"I Care"	Bhasker; Hugo; Beyoncé	4:09
20.	"Partition"	Dean; Beyoncé; Mosley; Nash; Timberlake; Harmon; Dwane Weir II	2:19
21.	"Yoncé"	Dean; Harmon; Beyoncé; Mosley; Nash; Timberlake	1:08
22.	"Mi Gente" (featuring J Balvin)	Adam Ashadally; Beyoncé; Mohombi Moupondo; Nash; José Alvaro Balvin; Suarez Ramirez; Echavarria Andrés Restrepo; Willy William; Sidney Brown; Graham; Shebib; Jordan Ullman; Weir; Diaz; Fisher; Sia Furler; Gregory Kurstin; Proctor; Soko	2:57
23.	"Baby Boy"	S. Carter; Sean Henriques; Ini Kamoze; Beyoncé; Storch; Waller; Mario Antonio Dunwell; Adidja Palmer; Linton White; Davis; Quame Riley	1:32
24.	"You Don't Love Me (No, No, No)"	Euwart Asman Beckford; Joshua Bishop Kelley; Willie C. Cobbs; Winston Delano Riley; Ophlin Russell-Meyers	1:12
25.	"Hold Up"	Thomas Wesley Pentz; Ezra Koenig; Beyoncé; Emile Haynie; Joshua Tillman; Uzoechi Emenike; Rhoden; Doc Pomus; Mort Shuman; DeAndre Way; Antonio Randolph; Kelvin McConnell; Brian Chase; Karen Orzolek; Nick Zinner	0:46
26.	"Countdown"	Michael Bivins; Ester Dean; Julie Frost; Beyoncé; Cainon Lamb; Nathan Morris; Wanya Morris; Nash; Robert Shea Taylor; Karl Rubin Brutus; Rogét Chahayed; Julian Gramma; Shelley Massenburg-Smith; Miles Parks McCollum	1:43
27.	"Check on It"	Angela Beyincé; Kasseem Dean; Hamler; Beyoncé; Stayve Thomas	1:16
28.	"Déjà Vu" (featuring Jay-Z)	S. Carter; Rodney Jerkins; Beyoncé; Keli Nicole Price; Riddick; Delisha Thomas; John Webb Jr.; Fela Anikulapo Kuti; Manu Dibango; Thomas R. Brenneck; Sean Combs; Levar Coppin; Michael Joseph Deller; David Anthony Guy; Deleno Matthews; Leon Michels; Gabriel Roth; Homer Steinweiss; Hamler; P. Williams	4:50
29.	"The Bzzzz Drumline" (interlude; announced by Slater Thorpe)	Beyoncé; Derek Dixie; Bzzzz Drumline; Harold Lilly Jr.; Elvis Williams; Pastor Troy; George Clinton Jr.; Grace Cook Hazel; Corey J. Johnson; Marrico D. King; Ralph Leverston; Martin Wondosas; Demetrius Hubert	3:10
30.	"Run the World (Girls)"	Beyoncé; Nash; Palmer; Pentz; David James Andrew Taylor; Nick van de Wall; Beyince; Solange Knowles; Jesse Rankins; Eddie Smith III; Jonathan Wells; R.S. Taylor; Jackie Jackson; Michael Jackson	3:53
31.	"Lose My Breath" (with Kelly Rowland and Michelle Williams)	Beyoncé; Fred Jerkins III; Rowland; LaShawn Daniels; Michelle Williams; R. Jerkins; Hamler; S. Carter; Beyince; Don Davis; Patrick Denard Douthit; Eddie C. Robinson	1:31
32.	"Say My Name" (with Rowland and Williams)	Beyoncé; Jerkins III; Rowland; Daniels; LaTavia Roberson; LeToya Luckett; R. Jerkins	1:52
33.	"Soldier" (with Rowland and Williams)	Beyoncé; Clifford Harris; D. Carter; Rowland; Michelle Williams; Harrison; Dean Garrett; Bobby Byrd; S. Carter; Justin Gregory Smith; John Cocker; Woodrow Cunningham; Norman Durham; Mikel Hooks; Ronald Hudson; Christopher Stainton; Larry Troutman; Roger Troutman; Davis; Donald Fletcher; Weldon Parks	2:11
34.	"Get Me Bodied"	Beyoncé; K. Dean; Hamler; S. Knowles; Riddick; Jerome Temple; Orville Erwin Hall; Phillip Glen Price; Chadron Moore; Jasiel Robinson; King Solomon Logan; Harmon	4:23
35.	"Single Ladies (Put a Ring on It)"	Thaddis Harrell; Beyoncé; Nash; Christopher Stewart	3:27
36.	"Lift Ev'ry Voice and Sing" (Blue's version; with Blue Ivy Carter)	James Weldon Johnson	1:42
37.	"Love on Top"	Beyoncé; Nash; R.S. Taylor; Cooper	3:47
38.	"Shining (Thank You)"	Bacharach; Brathwaite; Burley; S. Carter; David; Hills; Khaled; Beyoncé	2:39
39.	"Before I Let Go" (bonus track)	Frankie Beverly; Larry Blackmon; Tomi Jenkins	4:01
40.	"I Been On" (bonus track)	Beyoncé; Jamal Jones; Timothy Mosley; Jonathan "Anonymous" Solonne-Myvett; Theron Thomas; Timothy Thomas; Sonny Corey Uwaezuoke	2:25
Total length:			108:57

=== Notes ===
- "Welcome" contains elements of
  - "Family Feud", written by Shawn Carter, Dion Wilson, Elbernita Clark and Beyoncé, and performed by Jay Z and Beyoncé;
  - "Humble", written by Kendrick Lamar, Michael Williams and Asheton Hogan, and performed by Kendrick Lamar;
  - "Ffun", written by Michael Cooper, and performed by Con Funk Shun;
  - "Emerald City Sequence", written by Quincy Jones and Charles Smalls, from The Wiz.
- "Crazy In Love" contains elements of
  - "Back That Azz Up", written and performed by Terius Gray, Dwayne Carter and Byron Thomas;
  - "Dance (Ass)", written by Sean Anderson, Marcos Palacios, Ernest Clark, Marlyn Banks, Alonzo Miller, Stanley Kirk Burrell, Rick James, and performed by Big Sean.
- "Freedom" contains elements of
  - "Let Me Try", written by Frank Tirado, and performed by Kaleidoscope;
  - "Collection Speech/Unidentified Lining Hymn" and "Stewball", from Alan Lomax and John Lomax Sr., performed by Prisoner "22" at Mississippi State Penitentiary at Parchman;
  - "Down for My N's", written by Awood Johnson, Calvin Broadus, Corey Miller, Craig Lawson, and performed by C-Murder, Snoop Dogg and Magic.
- "Sorry" contains" elements of
  - "Me, Myself and I", written by Beyoncé, Scott Storch and Robert Waller, and performed by Beyoncé.
- "Bow Down" contains elements of
  - "Sorry", written by Beyoncé, Sean Rhoden and Diana Gordon, and performed by Beyoncé;
  - "Crown", written by Shawn Carter, Jacques Webster, Mike Dean, Kirk Bennett, Ebony Naomi Oshunrinde, Miguel Orlando Collins and Bobby Dixon, and performed by Jay Z.
- "I Been On" contains elements of
  - "Plan B", written by Craig Bazile, Percy Miller and Mia Young, and performed by Master P.
- "Drunk In Love" contains elements of
  - "Irreplaceable", written by Shaffer Smith, Mikkel Eriksen, Tor Hermansen, Beyoncé, Amund Bjørklund and Espen Lind, and performed by Beyoncé;
  - "Swag Surfin'", written by Alviticus Bryant, Jared Rice, Keishaun Watts, Kevin Michael Erondu, Michael Gordon Jr. and Sedarius Spearman, and performed by Fast Life Yungstaz;
  - "Rocket", written by Beyoncé, Miguel Jontel Pimentel, Timothy Mosley and Justin Timberlake, and performed by Beyoncé;
  - "Lilac Wine", written by James Shelton for the 1950 Broadway musical Dance Me a Song.
- "Diva" contains elements of
  - "Headlines", written by Aubrey Graham, Anthony Palman, Matthew Samuels, Noah Shebib, and performed by Drake;
  - "Everybody Mad", written and performed by O.T. Genasis;
  - "Dirt off Your Shoulder", written by Shawn Carter and Timothy Mosley, and performed by Jay Z.
- “Flawless / Feeling Myself” contains elements of
  - "SpottieOttieDopaliscious", written by Andre Benjamin, Antwan Patton and Patrick Brown, and performed by OutKast;
  - “Trophies”, written by Aubrey Graham, Chauncey Hollis Jr., Noah Shebib, Marvin Thomas, Raymond Martin, Bernard Gérard, Sharon Abshire, and performed by Drake;
  - “Bugatti”, written Antoine McColister, William Leonard Roberts II, Nayvadius Wilburn, Michael Williams and DJ Khaled, and performed by Ace Hood, Future and Rick Ross;
  - “*wokeuplikethis”, written by Jordan Carter, Symere Woods and Jordan Jenks, and performed by Playboi Carti and Lil Uzi Vert;
  - “Awwsome”, written by Marquis King and Manuel Alvarenga, and performed by Shy Glizzy;
  - "Crown", written by Shawn Carter, Jacques Webster, Mike Dean, Kirk Bennett, Ebony Naomi Oshunrinde, Miguel Orlando Collins & Bobby Dixon, and performed by Jay Z.
- "7/11" contains elements of
  - "Jumpman", written by Aubrey Graham, Leland Tyler Wayne and Nayvadius Wilburn, and performed by Drake and Future.
- "Bug a Boo Roll Call" contains elements of
  - "Shining", written by DJ Khaled, Beyoncé, Shawn Carter, Ingrid Burley, Floyd Hills, Jahron Brathwaite, Burt Bacharach and Hal David, and performed by DJ Khaled, Beyoncé and Jay Z;
  - "Ave Maria", written by Amanda Ghost, Beyoncé, Ian Dench, Makeba Riddick, Mikkel Storleer Eriksen and Tor Erik Hermansen, and performed by Beyoncé;
  - "Work It Out", written by Beyoncé, Chad Hugo and Pharrell Williams, and performed by Beyoncé.
- "Don't Hurt Yourself" contains elements of
  - "When the Levee Breaks", written by Jimmy Page, Robert Plant, John Paul Jones, and John Bonham, and performed by Led Zeppelin.
- "Mi Gente" contains elements of
  - "Standing On The Sun", written by Sia Furler, Greg Kurstin, Beyoncé, Noel Fisher, Brian Soko, Rasool Diaz and Andre Eric Proctor, and performed by Beyoncé and Mr. Vegas;
  - "Mine", written by Noah Shebib, Aubrey Graham, Beyoncé, Jordan Ullman, Sidney Brown and Dwane Weir, and performed by Beyoncé and Drake.
- "Baby Boy" contains elements of
  - "Fever", written by Adidja Azim Palmer, Linton Timajae White and Mario Dunwell, and performed by Vybz Kartel;
  - "Freaks", written by Quame Riley and Douglas Davis, and performed by Vicious.
- "You Don't Love Me (No, No, No)" contains elements of
  - "Bam Bam", written by Ophlin Russell and Wiston Riley, and performed by Sister Nancy.
- “Hold Up” contains elements of
  - “Maps”, written by Brian Chase, Karen Orzolek and Nick Zinner, and performed by the Yeah Yeah Yeahs;
  - "Can't Get Used to Losing You", written by Doc Pomus and Mort Shuman, performed by Andy Williams;
  - "Turn My Swag On", written by DeAndre Way, Antonio Randolph and Kelvin McConnell, performed by Soulja Boy.
- "Countdown" contains elements of
  - "Uhh Ahh", written by Michael Bivins, Nathan Morris and Wanya Morris, and performed by Boyz II Men;
  - "Broccoli", written by Shelley Massenburg-Smith, Miles McCollum, Rogét Chahayed, Karl Rubin and Julian Gramma, and performed by DRAM and Lil Yachty.
- “Déjà Vu” contains elements of
  - “Zombie”, written and performed by Fela Kuti;
  - “Soul Makossa”, written and performed by Manu Dibango;
  - “Green Light”, written by Beyoncé, Pharrell Williams and Garrett Hamler, and performed by Beyoncé;
  - "Roc Boys (And the Winner Is)...", written by Shawn Carter, Levar Coppin, Deleno Matthews and Sean Combs, and performed by Jay Z, which itselfs samples “Make the World by Walking”, written by Thomas Brenneck, Michael Deller, Leon Michels, Dave Guy, Bosco Mann, Homer Steinweiss, and performed by Menahan Street Band.
- "The Bzzzz Drumline" contains elements of
  - "Ego", written by Harold Lilly Jr., Elvis Williams and Beyoncé, and performed by Beyoncé;
  - "No More Play in G.A.", written and performed by Pastor Troy;
  - "Hay", written by George Clinton, Ralph Leverston, Corey Johnson, Marrico King, Wondosas Martin, Grace Hazel, and performed by Crucial Conflict.
- "Run The World (Girls)" includes elements of
  - "Pon de Floor", written by Thomas Pentz, David Taylor, Nick van de Wall and Adidja Azim Palmer, and performed by Major Lazor, Vybz Kartel and Afrojack;
  - "Can You Feel It", written by Michael Jackson and Jackie Jackson, and performed by The Jacksons;
  - "Why Don't You Love Me", written by Angela Beyince, Beyoncé, Solange Knowles, Jesse Rankins, Eddie Smith III, Jonathan Wells, and performed by Beyoncé.
- "Lose My Breath" contains elements of
  - "Girl", written by Beyoncé, Kelly Rowland, Michelle Williams, Patrick Douthit, Sean Garrett, Angela Beyincé, Don Davis and Eddie Robinson, and performed by Destiny's Child.
- "Soldier" contains elements of
  - "California Love", written by Tupac Shakur, Roger Troutman, Larry Troutman, Mikel Hooks, Norman Durham, Ronald Hudson, Woody Cunningham, Joe Cocker, Chris Stainton and James Anderson, and performed by 2Pac and Dr. Dre;
  - "U Don't Know", written by Shawn Carter, Justin Gregory Smith and Bobby Byrd, and performed by Jay Z.
- "Get Me Bodied" contains elements of
  - "Drag Rap (Triggerman)", written by Orville Hall and Phillip Price, and performed by Showboys;
  - "It's Goin' Down", written by Chadron Moore and Jasiel Robinson, and performed by Young Loc.
- "Love On Top" contains elements of
  - "Ffun", written by Michael Cooper, and performed by Con Funk Shun.

== Personnel ==
=== Production ===
- Beyoncé Knowles-Carter – live performance direction, executive production, music direction
- Derek Dixie – music direction, music mixing engineering, post audio engineering
- Teresa LaBarbera – audio production supervision
- Mariel Gomerez – music coordination
- Stuart White – music mixing engineering, post audio engineering
- Daniel Pampuri – recording engineering
- Lester Mendoza – music mixing engineering, recording engineering, post audio engineering
- Eric Hoffman – post audio engineering
- Daniel Pampun – assistant engineering
- Scott Kramer – assistant engineering
- Colin Leonard – mastering
- Kevin "Kwiz" Ryan – live performance audio engineering, recording engineering

=== Instrumentation ===
Band

- Simone Bozyermini
- Janee Dixon
- Chris Gray
- Arnetta Johnson
- Chris Johnson
- Corbin Jones
- Marie Katre
- Ariel O'Neal
- Peter Ortega
- Lauren Robinson
- Crystal Torres
- Rie Tsuji
- Lessie Vonner
- Venzella Joy Williams
- Vidie Williams

The Bzzzz (drumline live)

- Rasaq Adeyemi
- Larry Allen
- Mathew Ashraf
- Jacques Bell
- Alex Blake
- Tallie Brinson
- Issac Carter
- Kadeem Chambers
- Brandon Cunningham
- Jalen Harvey
- Rashaad Horne
- Keir Garner
- Dasmyn Grigsby
- Michael Jones
- Giovanni Luevano
- Lomario Marchman
- Maurice Mosley
- Naderah Munajj
- Joey Oakly
- Sjoerd Onley
- Ralph Nadar
- Jason Price
- Loubins Richard
- Erin Robinson
- Travord Rolle
- Brian Snell
- Nathaniel Spencer
- Sean Torres
- Wayne Westley

Background Vocals

- Tiffanie Cross
- Jasmin Cruz
- Steve Epting
- Naarai Jacobs
- Jamal Moore
- Dwanna Orange
- Kiandra Richardson
- Tiffany Moníque Ryan (assistant vocal arranger, lead background vocalist/ choir director)
- Jerome Wayne
- Chimera Wilson
- Cameron Wright
- George Young

Strings

- Crystal Alforque
- Nathalie Barret-Mas
- Amber Camp
- Jasmin Charles
- Rhea Hosanny
- Jessica Mcjunkins
- Ezinma
- Chala Yancy
- Crystal Brooke

== Charts ==
=== Weekly charts ===
Chart (2019)	Peak position
Australian Albums (ARIA)	18
Austrian Albums (Ö3 Austria)	46
Belgian Albums (Ultratop Flanders)	7
Belgian Albums (Ultratop Wallonia)	56
Canadian Albums (Billboard)	7
Danish Albums (Hitlisten)	11
Dutch Albums (Album Top 100)	9
Finnish Albums (Suomen virallinen lista)	41
French Albums (SNEP)	34
German Albums (Offizielle Top 100)	41
Irish Albums (IRMA)	20
Italian Albums (FIMI)	52
Latvian Albums (LAIPA)	23
Lithuanian Albums (AGATA)	6
New Zealand Albums (RMNZ)	22
Norwegian Albums (VG-lista)	18
Scottish Albums (Official Charts)	49
Spanish Albums (Promusicae)	88
Swedish Albums (Sverigetopplistan)	33
Swiss Albums (Schweizer Hitparade)	15
UK Albums (Official Charts)	25
US Billboard 200	4
US Top R&B/Hip-Hop Albums (Billboard)	2

=== Year-end charts ===
Chart (2019)	Position
Belgian Albums (Ultratop Flanders)	199
US Billboard 200	155
US Top R&B/Hip-Hop Albums (Billboard)	64

== Certifications ==
Region	Certification	Certified units/sales
Brazil (Pro-Música Brasil)	2× Platinum	80,000^{‡}
New Zealand (RMNZ)	Gold	7,500^{‡}
United States (RIAA)	Gold	500,000^{‡}
^{‡} Sales+streaming figures based on certification alone.
