= EveryBODYisflawless =

2014 short film

#everyBODYisflawless
- A screenshot from #everyBODYisflawless featuring Tess Munster, Gabi Gregg and Nadia Aboulhosn

Video by Gabi Gregg featuring Nadia Aboulhosn and Tess Munster
- Released: May 7, 2014
- Recorded: Los Angeles, 2014
- Genre: Trap, hip hop
- Length: 4:43
- Producer: Gabi Gregg, Helton Brazil Siqueira

#everyBODYisflawless is a music video featuring American plus-size fashion bloggers and models Gabi Gregg, Nadia Aboulhosn and Tess Munster, lip-synching to Beyoncé's 2013 song "Flawless". The video was released on May 7, 2014. It was created by Gregg to promote body positivity and acceptance in response to harassment.

== Background ==
Gabi "GabiFresh" Gregg was inspired to create a new version of Beyoncé's 2013 "Flawless" after receiving discrimination due to her body size. She decided to recreate the video to include larger bodies by recruiting and collaborating with fellow plus-size fashion bloggers and models Nadia Aboulhosn and Tess Munster to film the video.

Partly inspired by Beyoncé's decision to keep her entire self-titled album Beyoncé a secret until it was released, Gregg kept the video project a secret until its release. Gregg hopes that people support her campaign by using the hashtag and sharing the video.

Gregg said, "...This video is dedicated to the mainstream media, to the fashion industry, to internet bullies, and to anyone else who thinks it's their right to try to make us feel less than because of their insecurities." Aboulhosn said, "For me, this video is to show all of my followers that you define your definition of beauty..." Munster said, "This is OUR way of giving an 'eff you' to the critics that say we promote obesity, that we have no place in the fashion industry."

Gregg added: "As someone who gets my fair share of negativity in my industry, I thought the message was definitely applicable. I just wanted to do something fun that was also empowering women to give a middle finger to a fat-phobic society." Aboulhosn added: "All three of us are feminists, and we really wanted to get across the fact that we can all empower each other and work together in an industry that is so competitive. We aren't here to compete with each other; instead, we are here to uplift one another, especially because we have similar struggles in a world that isn't very accepting of us." Munster mused, "I want women, young girls to see this and realize that we are perfect the way we are, "to push back to the 'standards' that society tries to place on us and [realize] that we are so much stronger together."

== Development ==
The video was styled and produced by Gregg, and directed by Helton "Brazil" Siqueira. Gregg and Munster both live in the Los Angeles area and Aboulhosn flew in for a few days for the shoot. It took a month after that to finish the editing process with Siquiera.

The introduction reads: 'Fat is not a flaw'. It then segues into a music video featuring Gregg, Aboulhosn and Munster lip-synching and dancing to Beyonce's track. The clip shows the trio recreating the Beyoncé video in a wardrobe of sequins, shorts and crop-tops. The video ends with a Huffington Post comment: "Regardless of how people's metabolism function, or what they look like, each of us deserves respect, compassion, and can't be judged by anyone but themselves." It also uses the same excerpt by Chimamanda Ngozi Adichie from the original.

== Release ==
The video was uploaded on Vimeo on May 7, 2014. It was released two weeks after Beyoncé released her Pretty Hurts video and, subsequently, the #WhatIsPretty campaign, which asks fans to upload images and quotations that define what beauty means to them.

== Critical response ==
Julie Gerstein of BuzzFeed thought the aim of the video is "...To let women know that there's more than one ideal body, one ideal vision of beauty and that 'you don't have to be a certain size to claim your flawlessness'." Danielle Young of Hello Beautiful said, "The result is an absolutely flawless display of self love that can inspire even those who wear single digit clothing. You don't have to be plus size to know that loving your body is a must." Michelle Guerrero Denison of Zaftig Times said, "obvious sisterhood, body positivity, and feminism oozing through this video." Maeve Keirans said, "...the fact that Beyonce, Gabi, Nadia, and Tess are making people talk about it and are opening their minds/beliefs/understandings to the variety out there is very cool. Bow down." Kimberley Foster of Coloures said, "...I can only imagine the psychological toll the endless body shaming must take on these women. Creating their own image of unity and confident to combat the nastiness was an incredible idea..."

Bellanaija.com thought the "Three plus size bloggers – GabiFresh, Nadia Aboulhosn, and Tess Munster, prove you can be big, absolutely fabulous, and comfortable in your own skin." Liza of Persephone Magazine thought "There's something truly magical about seeing big boobs, back rolls, and flabby arms moving without apology and with confidence channeled from Queen Bey [Beyoncé] herself." Cassandra of Swagger New York thought "the ladies go from glam to hood chic as they lip sync the track in between close ups of their curves." Daily Life commented that it "features some pretty fantastic fashions..."

SourceFed said, "This is an amazing movement, and a grand example of three very different plus size women recreating and reinterpreting such a positive, empowering piece of art. FLAWLESS." Alex Rees of Cosmopolitan thought it is a "kick-ass music video. One that comes with the hashtag #everyBODYisflawless, as a means of furthering the conversation around — and in support of — body positivity, in all shapes and sizes." Liz Black of Refinery29 said, "With huge social followings of their own, these body-positive women are already influential. But, this video speaks volumes of truth that they may not have previously revealed..." Clutch said about Gregg, "...her version of Beyonce's '***Flawless' video is a celebration of everything body positive." Sweetest thought "Other women of all sizes and backgrounds should stand up against set beauty standards for women and know that #EveryBodyIsFlawless." Giselle Childs of StyleBlazer reiterated "...Every body is flawless. It's a lesson we should all take care to remember."

Emma Cueto of Bustle said, "...used to promote body positivity and fat acceptance... and all three ladies kill it... So checkout GabiFresh's Twitter hashtag #everyBODYisflawless and prepare to fall in love with her video." CRAZY COOL GROOVY!!! thought the women "put their own brand-spankin' new spin on the BEYONCE banger, FLAWLESS!!!" Sinha Smrita of Mic noted "The movement seems to have hit something of a nerve online, where people have taken to social media to applaud the concept." Yesha Callahan of The Root noted "As the video went viral, kudos have been pouring in:" Arabelle Sicardi of The Style Con said about Gregg, "When she dropped this video on us, my love for her was sealed for all of eternity."

Eun Kyung Kim of Today said of the video, "The result is full of attitude and self acceptance." Laura Williamson of Mamamia thought "...this the most ***Flawless, film clip recreation ever." Kaitlyn of Autostraddle said "The result is — forgive me — flawless." Rebecca Rose of Jezebel described it as "FUCKING FLAWLESS MAGIC": Kate Lloyd of Grazia Daily stated "We love it". Nina Bahadur of The Huffington Post claimed "We couldn't 'bow down' any further if we tried." Maura Brannigan of Lucky called it a "wonderful video". Ellen Stewart of My Daily described it as "Totally amazing". Haley Blum of Entertain This! thought the women were "...looking pretty dang flawless." Prachi Gupta of Salon said, "So go ahead and bow down to these ladies, because they've got something important to say:" Ashley Hoffman of Styleite said, "Bow down bitches". ColorLines said of the video, "Here's a little body positivity..."

== See also ==
- Fat acceptance movement
- Plus-size model
- Lip dub
- Lip-synching in music
