= Ezinma =

American violinist

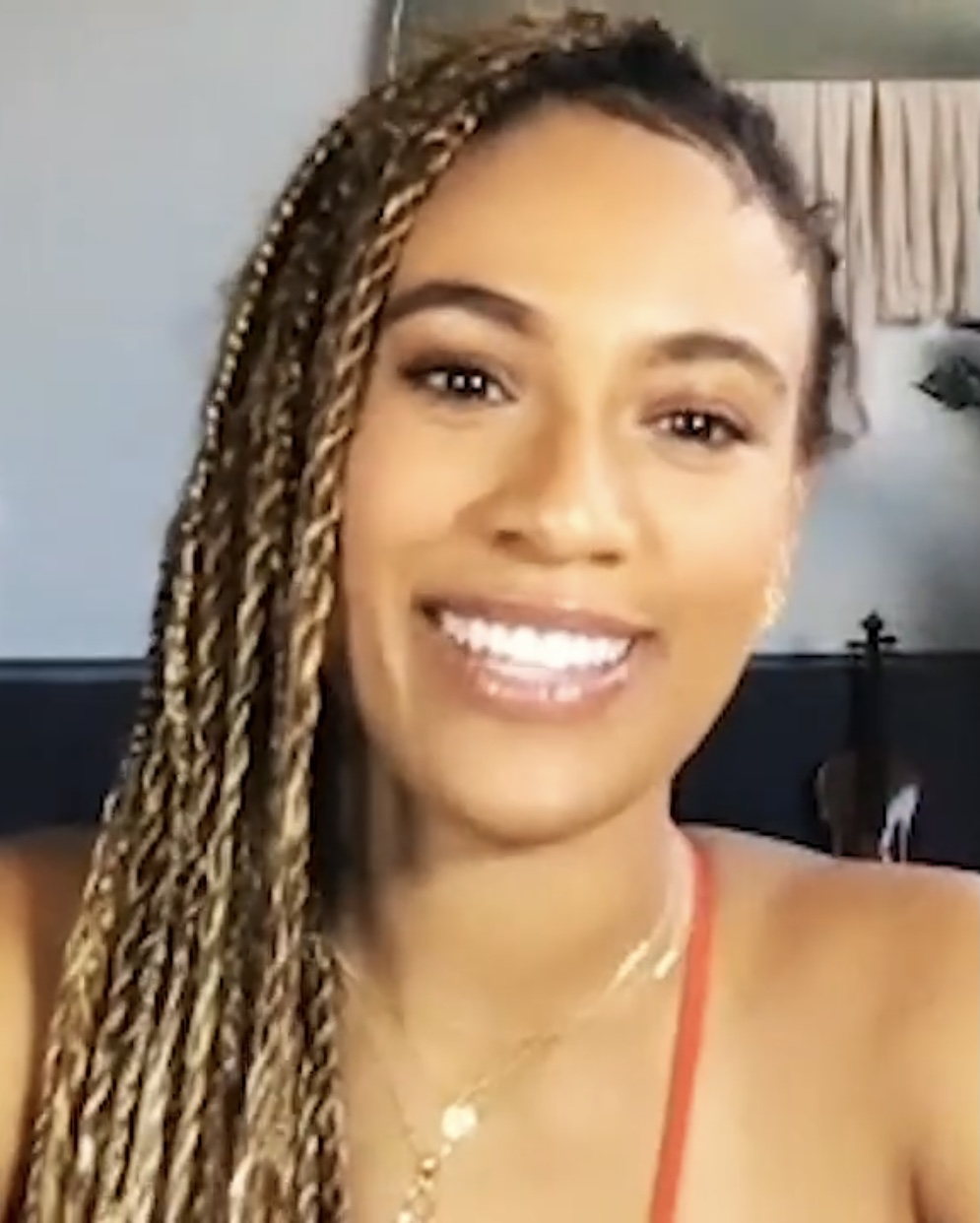
- Ezinma in 2021

Background information
- Born: Meredith Ezinma Ramsay; January 11, 1991 (age 35); Lincoln, Nebraska
- Genres: hip hop, classical
- Occupations: Violinist; composer; model; educator
- Instrument: Violin
- Years active: 2016–present
- Label: Universal Music Classics

Meredith Ezinma Ramsay (born January 11, 1991), known professionally as Ezinma, is an American violinist, model, music educator and film composer from Lincoln, Nebraska. Ramsay gained viral fame in 2017 by performing a violin cover of American rapper Future's hit "Mask Off", and for her performance during Beyoncé's 2018 Coachella performance. In 2020 she debuted as a solo musician under Universal Music Classics.

== Life and career ==
=== Early life ===
Ezinma was born in Lincoln, Nebraska, to a Guyanese father and German-American mother. Her father is a professor of actuarial science, while her mother is a creative non-fiction author and works as an English professor. Ezinma started playing the violin at age three, and continued to play throughout school. By junior high school, she felt alone as she was often the only black classical musician onstage, and did not meet another black string musician until she was 13. As a child, she listened to a wide range of music, including her funk, reggae, jazz, and Caribbean soca due to her father, and Americana through her mother.

Ezinma attended the University of Nebraska–Lincoln, where she originally studied pre-med, before switching degrees to music. At university, Ezinma formed a string and piano trio, and was mentored by members of the Chiara String Quartet.

In 2012, Ezinma moved from Nebraska to New York to study at Mannes School of Music, the classical division of the New School, which helped her see outside the rules of classical music. Ezinma began releasing music featuring both her violin performance and vocals, and intended to release these songs on an extended play called I Am Ezinma in 2016.

=== Viral popularity ===
Ezinma began posting videos of her performing violin covers of songs to social media in 2016. Her first cover was a 15 second clip of Adele's "Hello" posted to Instagram. During this time, Ezinma continued to release original music, such as "Elevate Me" in 2016, and the instrumental "Give It Up" in 2017.

In April 2017, Ezinma uploaded a cover of Future "Mask Off" as a part of a viral challenge featuring instrumental covers of the song. Ezinma's version gained her millions of views across Instagram, Twitter and YouTube, and led to a sudden increase in her popularity. American musician Beyoncé took notice of Ezinma's videos on social media (even before her version of "Mask Off"), and invited her to perform as a part of Beyoncé's 2018 Coachella performance in April 2018. Between 2017 and 2018, Ezinma appeared in modelling campaigns for Adidas, Gap Inc. and Gucci.

=== Debut ===
In early 2019, Ramsay signed to Universal Music Classics. She plans to release a classical-fusion album with hip-hop/trap influences in 2020, entitled Key of Black Minor, to be released alongside a documentary of her life. Ramsay has worked as a film composer, scoring the soundtracks to the documentary film The Times of Bill Cunningham (2020), and the Oluniké Adeliyi-starring short film Promise Me (2020). In August, Ezinma released her debut single "Beethoven Pleads the Fifth".

Ezinma partnered with Wide Open School, Re-Create (a program to provide educational content for public elementary schools in New York) and After-School All-Stars to create violin-related educational content for schools and after-school programs in the United States.

== Personal life ==
Ezinma's parents divorced when she was young, and she has two brothers and two sisters. Her mother, Lisa Knopp, is an author of creative non-fiction books, and works as a professor at the University of Nebraska–Lincoln.

She is an honorary member of Sigma Gamma Rho sorority.

== Discography ==
=== Extended plays ===
Title	Details
Classical Bae	Released: May 14, 2021; Label: Universal Music Classics

=== Singles ===
List of singles, showing year released and album name
Title	Year	Album
"Beethoven Pleads the Fifth"	2020	Classical Bae
"Vivaldi Springs Forth"	2020	Classical Bae
"Drummer Bae"	2020	Non-album single
"Ode to Hustle"	2021	Classical Bae

=== Guest appearances ===
Title	Year	Other artists	Album
"String Quartet No. 1"	2015	Ayumi Okada, Karen Dekker, Rose Hashimoto, James Waldo	Here, Where the Land Ends and the Sea Begins
"Piano Trio No. 1"	2015	Ayumi Okada, James Waldo, Alyona Aksyonova	Here, Where the Land Ends and the Sea Begins
"Black Panther"	2018	Kendrick Lamar	Black Panther: The Album
"All the Stars"	2018	Kendrick Lamar, SZA	Black Panther: The Album
"Dazed & Confused [Acoustic Version]"	2018	Ruel	Non-album single
"Poison Intro"	2018	Swizz Beatz, Áine Zion	Poison
"Lift Every Voice and Sing"	2019	Beyoncé	Homecoming: The Live Album
"Déjà Vu"	2019	Beyoncé, Jay-Z	Homecoming: The Live Album
"Don't Hurt Yourself"	2019	Beyoncé	Homecoming: The Live Album
"Heaven's Gate"	2019	Jae the Dreamer	Equal & Opposite
"When We're Awake"	2019	Sam O.B., Denitia	Non-album single
