= Tess Holliday =

American plus-size model

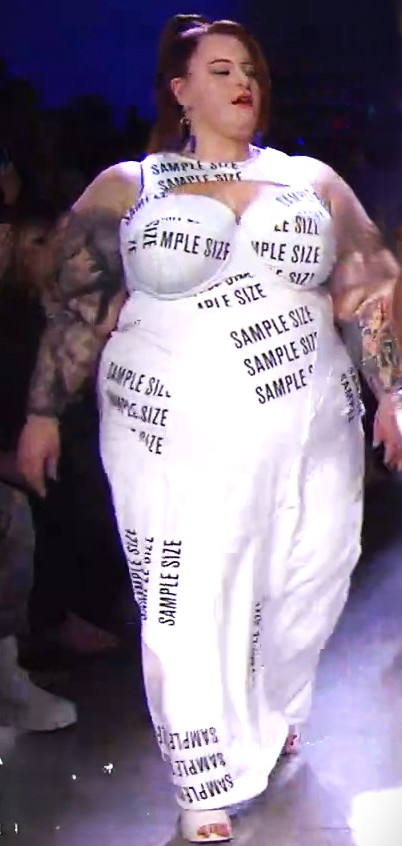
- Holliday walks the New York Fashion Week 2020 runway for Chromat
- Born: Ryann Maegen Hoven; July 5, 1985 (age 41); Laurel, Mississippi, U.S.
- Other name: Tess Munster
- Occupations: Model, make-up artist, blogger
- Years active: 2000, 2010–present
- Spouse: Nick Holliday (m. 2015; div. 2020)
- Children: 2
- Modeling information
- Hair color: Brown
- Eye color: Brown
- Agency: Mavrick Artists Agency, Milk Model Management

Ryann Maegen Hoven (born July 5, 1985), known professionally as Tess Holliday and formerly known as Tess Munster, is an American plus-size model, blogger, and make-up artist based in Los Angeles.

== Early life ==
Holliday was born and raised in Laurel, Mississippi. Her mother left her father when Holliday was a young child, and Holliday claims her family moved 40 times before she turned 10.

In June 1995, her mother was paralyzed and disabled after she was shot twice in the head by her fiancé, who was charged with attempted murder. At the age of 10, Holliday and her brother moved back to their grandparents' house in Mississippi while their mother recovered.

Holliday was bullied from fifth grade on for her weight and pale skin, having a disabled mother, and because they lived in a trailer behind her grandparents' house. She left school at the age of 17 and earned her GED.

Holliday has also alleged that her father verbally abused her for her size, but that her mother encouraged her to become a model. Holliday has severed contact with her father.

== Career ==
At the age of 15, while she was a US size 16 (UK 18/20) and 5 feet 3 inches tall, Holliday auditioned at a casting call for plus models in Atlanta, Georgia, where she was told she would be lucky to do print advertisements or catalogue work because she was too short and big.

Subsequently, Holliday relocated to Seattle where she stayed for two years and worked as a make-up artist, hair stylist and creative director at fashion shows. She then moved back to Mississippi and gave birth to her son (at the age of 20). Then, following Hurricane Katrina, she returned to Seattle (where she had some pictures taken for her then-boyfriend and posted them on Model Mayhem in October 2009) then she moved to Los Angeles in 2010.

Her move to Los Angeles helped her gain confidence. She became a professional model in 2011 while working as a receptionist at a Los Angeles dental office. She responded to 'House of Dreams Model Search' by Torrid and was accepted. At the same time, A&E chose her to be the face of documentary television series Heavy after being discovered online. In June 2011, she became the face of the television show and was on an advert that ran nationwide and billboards across the country. Holliday has been featured on "fatshion" blogs, she models accessories and plus size clothing lines, and was contacted to audition for Vh1's The Big Girls Club. She has shot a campaign for Benefit Cosmetics, worked with David LaChapelle, featured in Vogue Italia and appeared in Nylon magazine.

In 2014, Holliday quit her day job at the dental office to pursue modelling full-time. In May 2014, a video was uploaded on Vimeo called #everyBODYisflawless, which featured Holliday and fellow plus-size fashion bloggers and models Gabi Gregg and Nadia Aboulhosn lip-synching and dancing to Beyoncé's 2013 song "Flawless". In September of that year, she was interviewed by Jacob Soboroff and Meghan McCain on TakePart Live.

In January 2015, London-based modeling agency Milk Model Management announced that they had signed Holliday to their plus-size division, Curves. They declared that Holliday had become the largest plus-size model of her size and height to be signed to a mainstream modeling agency and the first Curve model above a size 20. In May, she had her first agency shoot.

In March 2014, Holliday became the first model over size 18 to model Monif Clarke's clothing line after she was hired as the face of the latest campaign for her swimwear line Sea by Monif C - a line that is specifically designed for women sizes 14–24. In the same month, she modeled for Torrid. She also collaborated with the plus size clothing retailer Yours Clothing for the second time when she was officially announced as the face of their high summer campaign. In May 2015, she was featured on the cover of People.

In September 2015, Holliday starred in H&M's sustainable fashion campaign alongside singer Iggy Pop, artist Daniel Lismore, sex blogger Karley Sciortino and blogger Pardeep Singh Bahra. In the same month, she starred in Addition Elle's fall 2015 capsule collection campaign. In the same month, she also confirmed that she was in the process of designing her own clothing line. In November of the same year, she was involved in a fashion shoot for Marie Claire UK's December 2015 issue.

In January 2016, Canadian plus-size retailer Penningtons announced that the brand has partnered with Holliday to release a capsule collection bearing her name under their mblm label.

== Activism ==
Holliday also self-describes as a "body positive activist". She embraces the word 'fat' and advocates that people should be able to eat as much and whatever they want without suffering from social ostracism. In 2013, she started her #effyourbeautystandards movement on Instagram. Holliday claims the movement shows women that they do not have to be a certain size to love their body (big or small) and that their size should not dictate their fashion choices. Since February 2015, Holliday has employed a team of six social media specialists to help manage her message across the world. She has said that the movement has led to women letting her know that they now feel good about how they look and wear what they like. She also talks at public events about body confidence.

In February 2014, Holliday appeared on Channel 4 News. In April 2015, she was interviewed by Meredith Vieira on The Meredith Vieira Show. In the same month, she appeared on Plus Sized Wars, a Channel 4 documentary about changing beauty standards and explores the fast-growing plus-size fashion industry.

In August 2015, Holliday demanded a boycott of Facebook, Instagram and Tumblr accounts under the name 'Project Harpoon', which photoshopped her image and images of other women including Rebel Wilson and Melissa McCarthy to make them appear slimmer without authorization. In September 2015, she criticized Victoria's Secret for their limited amount of plus-size clothing options.

In a January 2016 interview with Paper, Holliday stated that she embraces the term "plus-size" and disagrees with other people's rejection of it. She discussed how she does see how the term as negative or derogatory and thought the term is 'very important' for larger women to have their own labels.

== Controversy ==
In late 2014, Holliday began producing a series of T-shirts with the phrase "Eff Your Beauty Standards", with some of the proceeds being donated to an organization that helps survivors of domestic violence. In December, approximately 140 orders failed to deliver to customers, though about 3000 orders were successful. A post on Reddit accused her of withholding money promised to charity, as well as not delivering her products.

In December 2015, Holliday told Refinery29 that the project was launched with "pure intentions" and "My mother and I are both victims of [domestic violence]." She said, "The idea that I would willfully defraud the people who have supported me along the way, and a charity that touches on my own family's struggles, is so upsetting." Holliday admits that she did not know how to handle the logistics of the project, was unable to keep up with orders, and takes responsibility for some customers not receiving the merchandise they paid for. "The system we were using just didn't work," she said, attributing missing merchandise to "one big batch that was lost by the post office" and "usual business discrepancies". She was unable to make the charity donation after paying "thousands and thousands of dollars" out of pocket to a shipping and distribution center to ensure issues with merchandise would be resolved, which "ate up what little [was] left of the profits". She added that she has given a "substantial contribution" to the National Coalition Against Domestic Violence. In January 2016, National Coalition Against Domestic Violence's Development Manager Dina Coates Koebler confirmed, "A donation in the amount of $1,000 was made to our organization on 12/13/2015 by Ms. Hoven."

== Personal life ==
At the age of 20, Holliday gave birth to her son Rylee. In June 2015, The Guardian reported she no longer had any contact with her son's father.

In 2012, Holliday met Australian businessman, photographer and artist Nick Holliday on Tumblr. They talked online for seven months before Holliday traveled to the U.S. to visit, and in April 2015, he moved from Melbourne to the U.S. On July 5, 2014, they got engaged. They secretly wed one year later on July 5, 2015. In January 2016, it was announced that Holliday was pregnant and expected to give birth in June. Holliday gave birth to her second son in June 2016. She and Nick Holliday have since divorced, describing the marriage as having been abusive.

She was born Ryann Hoven but changed her name to Tess Munster (a surname she chose because she liked the television sitcom The Munsters) when she started doing alternative modeling and has also used the name Tess Typhoon. In January 2015, she adopted and officially started using her fiancé's surname.

In 2019, Holliday came out as pansexual. In 2021, Holliday claimed that she was in recovery from atypical anorexia.

Holliday states that she is 5 feet 5 inches (165 cm) tall and that she wears a US dress size 22 or 3x. She is heavily tattooed, including a Miss Piggy tattoo on her right outer forearm, a Mae West tattoo on her right inner forearm, a Marilyn Monroe tattoo on her left bicep, a plus-size mermaid tattoo on her right upper thigh, a Hello Kitty tattoo on her right calf and a Dolly Parton tattoo on her right arm. She also has a septum piercing.

== See also ==
- Fat acceptance movement
- Health at Every Size
