= Homecoming: A Film by Beyoncé =

2019 concert film by Beyoncé

- Directed by: Beyoncé; Ed Burke
- Written by: Beyoncé
- Based on: Beyoncé's 2018 Coachella headlining performance
- Produced by: Steve Pamon; Erinn Williams
- Starring: Beyoncé; Jay-Z; Kelly Rowland; Michelle Williams; Solange Knowles
- Narrated by: Beyoncé
- Cinematography: Mark Ritchie
- Edited by: Live performance; Alexander Hammer; Documentary; Andrew Morrow; Nia Imani; Julian Klincewicz
- Music by: Beyoncé
- Production company: Parkwood Entertainment
- Distributed by: Netflix
- Release date: April 17, 2019
- Running time: 137 minutes
- Country: United States
- Language: English

Homecoming: A Film by Beyoncé is a 2019 documentary concert film about American singer Beyoncé's performance at the 2018 Coachella Valley Music and Arts Festival. She wrote, executive-produced, and directed the film. It was released on April 17, 2019, by Netflix, alongside an accompanying live album.

Beyoncé's headlining performances at the 2018 Coachella festival took place on April 14 and 21. She was the first Black woman to headline the festival and her performance received widespread critical acclaim. Many in the media described the show as "historic," while The New York Times proclaimed it as "meaningful, absorbing, forceful and radical."

Her performances paid tribute to the culture of historically black colleges and universities, featuring a full marching band and majorette dancers, while incorporating various aspects of Black Greek life, such as a step show along with strolling by pledges. The productions were also influenced by Black feminism, sampling Black authors and featuring on-stage appearances by fellow Destiny's Child members Kelly Rowland and Michelle Williams, her husband Jay-Z, and her sister Solange Knowles.

The film won Best Music Film at the Grammy Awards and Best Music Documentary at the IDA Documentary Awards. It was also nominated for six awards at the Primetime Emmy Awards.

== Background ==
On January 4, 2017, Beyoncé was announced as a headlining act for the April 2017 Coachella festival. However, on February 23, 2017, she postponed her performance until the following year, due to doctors' concerns regarding her pregnancy with twins (born in June 2017). The secondary (resale) market for tickets to the festival that year fell 12% after she announced the postponement.

Playing her rescheduled dates in 2018, Beyoncé became the first Black woman to headline the festival. In its nearly 20 years of existence, the festival has only had two other female solo headliners, Lady Gaga (who replaced Beyoncé in 2017) and Björk (2002 and 2007). Before Beyoncé's performance, the nickname "Beychella" emerged for the 2018 festival. Tina Knowles, mother of Beyoncé and Solange Knowles, later said that before the show, she had expressed reservations about the performance Beyoncé had planned, worried that the largely white audience at Coachella might not understand a show so steeped in Black culture, particularly Black college culture. Tina recounted that Beyoncé replied that given the platform she had achieved in her career, she felt "a responsibility to do what's best for the world and not what is most popular."

== Themes ==
=== Musical styles ===
Writing in The New Yorker, Doreen St. Félix described the musical style of the performance as an "education in Black expression [... and] musical history – a mélange of New Orleans and its horns, Houston and its chopped and screwed beats, Brooklyn and its rap velocity, Kingston and its dancehall, and Nigeria and the legacy of its dissenter, Fela Kuti [...] underscoring not only [Beyoncé's] Southernness but the global Black vernacular that continues to shape her." Near the beginning of the set, Beyoncé sang "Lift Every Voice and Sing," colloquially known as the "Black national anthem." The Wiz, one of Motown's most notable motion pictures, was also sampled in the horn arrangement that heralded Beyoncé's return to the stage after her first costume change.

=== Historically black colleges and universities (HBCU) ===
The performance pays strong tribute to HBCUs, featuring an African-American marching band and majorette dancers.

The performance has been credited as paying a strong tribute to the HBCU experience. A full African-American marching band played during much of the set, accompanied by majorette dancers. Writing for Mic.com, Natelegé Whaley stated that the band consisted of members from various HBCUs and played samples of songs that are often played at an HBCU such as "Swag Surf", "Broccoli", and "Back that Azz Up", along with samples of gospel and go-go music. Journalists also noted that the set incorporated various aspects of Black Greek life, such as a step show along with strolling by neophytes (also known as pledges). School Daze, a notable Spike Lee film, is also referenced. Beyoncé's first outfit was a yellow sweatshirt with the Greek letters ΒΔΚ that read Beta Delta Kappa. Later, she came out in a shirt with a shield designed with Nefertiti, Black Panther, a Black power fist, and a bee, which outlets such as The Washington Post credited as a reference to the shields each Black fraternity and sorority have signifying the values of the particular fraternity or sorority.

Following the show, Beyoncé announced the expansion of her HBCU scholarship fund, BeyGOOD Initiative's Homecoming Scholars Award program (previously known as the Formation Scholars Award program, announced on the one-year anniversary of Lemonade). In the program's second year, it would support one student at each of eight HBCUs: Texas Southern University, Morehouse College, Fisk University, Grambling State University, Xavier University of Louisiana, Wilberforce University, Tuskegee University and Bethune-Cookman University.

=== Black feminism ===
Reviewers noted the influence of Black feminism on Beyoncé's performance, including her sampling of Nigerian author Chimamanda Ngozi Adichie's TED Talk on feminism and the appearances on stage of former collaborators Kelly Rowland and Michelle Williams of Destiny's Child as well as her sister Solange; writing in Cosmopolitan, Brittney Cooper read Beyoncé's decision to involve these Black women in the landmark performance as a gesture of sisterhood.

== "Beychella" performances ==
"Beychella"
- Concert by Beyoncé
- Location: Indio, California
- Venue: Empire Polo Club (2018 Coachella Valley Music and Arts Festival)
- Dates: April 14 and April 21, 2018

The performances were held at the Coachella festival on April 14 and 21, 2018. The performances featured an ensemble of dancers, with her sister Solange, her husband Jay-Z, and her former girl group Destiny's Child joining Beyoncé on stage. On April 21, 2018, she was joined by J Balvin for "Mi Gente" with his verse sung first, though this was not included in the film. She played a 26-song set to 125,000 concertgoers. The set sampled Malcolm X and Nina Simone among others. Beyoncé wore five different costumes during the two-hour performance, designed with Olivier Rousteing of French fashion house Balmain.

=== Reception ===
Beyoncé's performance garnered 458,000 simultaneous viewers to become the festival's most-viewed performance to date and the most-viewed live-streamed performance of all time, with the entire performance having 41 million total viewers from around the world, 75% more than the previous year.

The performance received universal critical acclaim. In The New York Times, music critic Jon Caramanica wrote: "There's not likely to be a more meaningful, absorbing, forceful and radical performance by an American musician this year, or any year soon, than Beyoncé's headlining set" at the festival. "It was rich with history, potently political, and visually grand. By turns uproarious, rowdy, and lush. A gobsmacking marvel of choreography and musical direction." In Variety, Chris Willman wrote, "The show served as a testament ... to Beyoncé as the premier musical performer of our time." The Washington Post, CNN, NBC, Entertainment Weekly, and Billboard all described the performance as "historic".

== Release ==
On April 3, 2019, it was reported that Beyoncé was working on new music, and a collaborative project with Netflix that would be tied to her Coachella 2018 performance with additional footage. On April 6, 2019, Netflix officially teased the project by posting on social media a yellow image with the word "Homecoming" and the film's release date. The film's trailer was released on April 8, and was viewed over 16.6 million times across all Netflix social media accounts and Beyoncé's Facebook page within the first 24 hours. On the film's release, Beyoncé released a live album entitled Homecoming: The Live Album. Homecoming had 757,000 interactions across Facebook, Instagram and Twitter over its first week. Homecoming: A Film by Beyoncé is the first of three projects Beyoncé has committed to Netflix under a reported $60 million deal.

Nielsen reported that the film was watched by 1.1 million in the US in its first day, excluding views on mobile devices and computers, which Variety noted may have resulted in a sizable undercount of views due to the "youth-skewing makeup of the 'Homecoming' viewership." 55% of viewership in the first seven days came from African Americans, higher than any other original streaming series or film tracked by Nielsen to date, ahead of Bird Box, which had 24% African American viewership. According to Netflix, Homecoming: A Film by Beyoncé was the fourth most popular documentary offered on the platform in 2019, and was the only concert film to appear on the list.

== Critical reception ==
Homecoming: A Film by Beyoncé received widespread critical acclaim. On review aggregator website Rotten Tomatoes, the film holds an approval rating of 98% based on 55 reviews, with an average rating of 8.9/10. The website's critics consensus states: "Beychella forever." On Metacritic, it has a weighted average score of 93 out of 100, based on 14 critics, indicating "universal acclaim".

Several publications named Homecoming: A Film by Beyoncé one of the greatest concert films of all time, including RogerEbert.com, The Washington Post, The Hollywood Reporter, Deadline, Refinery29, Chatelaine, The Guardian, and Chicago Sun-Times. Spencer Kornhaber of The Atlantic called Homecoming "one of Beyoncé's masterpieces", adding that the film's "combo of well-edited stage spectacle and behind-the-scenes segments—intimate, hard-fought, occasionally tense, politically explicit, personally specific segments—make it a career-defining document." David Ehrlich of IndieWire wrote that "Beyoncé managed to fit the whole spectacle into a euphoric, triumphant, and exhaustingly fierce documentary that should help see Beychella enshrined as one of the definitive pop culture events of the century."

Tobi Oredein of Metro wrote that Homecoming "reminds us that Beyoncé isn't just the greatest entertainer of all time, but the most exciting visionary in entertainment today." Andrea Valdez and Angela Watercutter of Wired named Homecoming as a "once-in-a-lifetime performance by one of the world's greatest living artists that our hyperconnected world allows everyone to celebrate together." Danielle Cadet wrote for Refinery29 that the film showcases Beyoncé's "world-class talent and work ethic, proving no one ever has nor ever will do it like she does."

Barrett Holmes of the BBC described the film as "much more than a film about the first black woman to headline the Coachella music festival," saying "through including quotes and audio from black leaders and intellectuals, Homecoming displayed the beauty of Black culture, and gave people the chance to celebrate the necessity of black education. It is a celebration of black American culture with education, specifically Historically Black Colleges and Universities (HBCUs), serving as the foundation of her message." Judy Berman of Time magazine stated that the film "recontextualizes the show in a way that claimed the most influential live music event in North America for Black culture."

== Accolades ==
Homecoming: A Film by Beyoncé was named the greatest documentary of 2019 by The Daily Dot. The film was also included in Paste's list of the 15 best documentaries of 2019. Decider journalist Claire Spellberg placed Homecoming at number two on her list of the best in television and film in 2019. Homecoming was also named the third best movie of any genre of 2019 by both Thomas Atkinson for The Skinny and Ken Bakely for Film Pulse, while Decider named it seventh best. Homecoming ranked at number one on Metacritic's list of the best miniseries, TV movies and specials of 2019, and at number two on Rotten Tomatoes' list of the Best Reviewed TV & Streaming Movies of the same year. The Los Angeles Times ranked Beyoncé's Coachella set and Homecoming number one on its "The Millennium 200" list chronicling the greatest pop culture moments of the first 20 years of the millennium. Homecoming was declared by Letterboxd as the fourth greatest documentary or nonfiction film of the decade (2010s). Homecoming was included in Insider's list of the "21 Netflix originals everyone should watch in their lifetime, according to critics".

The film won Best Music Film at the 62nd Annual Grammy Awards, making it the second winner in this category to be directed or co-directed by the artist, and the first individual African American female artist to win since Janet Jackson in 1989.

Year	Award	Category	Nominee(s)	Result	Ref.
2019	Black Reel Television Awards	Outstanding Television Documentary or Special	Beyoncé Knowles-Carter and Derek Dixie	Nominated	
2019	Cinema Eye Awards	Broadcast Film	Homecoming: A Film by Beyoncé	Nominated	
2019	Cinema Eye Awards	Broadcast Editing	Homecoming: A Film by Beyoncé	Nominated	
2019	Cinema Eye Awards	Broadcast Cinematography	Homecoming: A Film by Beyoncé	Won	
2019	Grierson Awards	Best Arts or Music Documentary	Homecoming: A Film by Beyoncé	Shortlisted	
2019	IDA Documentary Awards	Best Music Documentary	Homecoming: A Film by Beyoncé	Won	
2019	International Online Cinema Awards TV Awards	Variety, Comedy or Music Program	Homecoming: A Film by Beyoncé	Won	
2019	National Film & Television Awards	Best Documentary	Homecoming: A Film by Beyoncé	Nominated	
2019	Online Film & Television Association Awards	Best Variety Program	Homecoming: A Film by Beyoncé	Nominated	
2019	Online Film & Television Association Awards	Best Direction of a Reality or Non-Fiction Program	Beyoncé Knowles-Carter and Derek Dixie	Won	
2019	Primetime Emmy Awards	Outstanding Variety Special (Pre-Recorded)	Homecoming: A Film by Beyoncé	Nominated	
2019	Primetime Emmy Awards	Outstanding Costumes for a Variety, Nonfiction, or Reality Programming	Marni Senofonte, Olivier Rousteing and Timothy White	Nominated	
2019	Primetime Emmy Awards	Outstanding Directing for a Variety Special	Beyoncé Knowles-Carter and Ed Burke	Nominated	
2019	Primetime Emmy Awards	Outstanding Music Direction	Beyoncé Knowles-Carter and Derek Dixie	Nominated	
2019	Primetime Emmy Awards	Outstanding Production Design for a Variety Special	Ric Lipson, Rachel Duncan and Andrew Makadsi	Nominated	
2019	Primetime Emmy Awards	Outstanding Writing for a Variety Special	Beyoncé Knowles-Carter	Nominated	
2020	BET Awards	Best Movie	Homecoming: A Film by Beyoncé	Nominated	
2020	Grammy Awards	Best Music Film	Beyoncé Knowles-Carter, Ed Burke and Dora Melissa Vargas	Won	
2020	NAACP Image Awards	Outstanding Variety (Series or Special)	Homecoming: A Film by Beyoncé	Won	
2020	NAACP Image Awards	Outstanding Documentary (Television – Series or Special)	Homecoming: A Film by Beyoncé	Nominated	
2020	NME Awards	Best Music Film	Homecoming: A Film by Beyoncé	Nominated	
2020	Online Film Critics Society Awards	Best Non-Theatrical Releases	Homecoming: A Film by Beyoncé	Won	
2020	Talk Film Society Awards	Best Documentary	Homecoming: A Film by Beyoncé	Nominated	
2020	Visionary Honours	Documentary of the Year	Homecoming: A Film by Beyoncé	Nominated	

== Set list ==
The following songs were performed during both sets, and included in the film.

1. "Welcome" (contains elements of "Ffun", "Humble", "Family Feud" and "Emerald City Sequence")
2. "Crazy in Love" (contains elements of "I'm a Hustla", "Dance (Ass)" and "Back That Azz Up")
3. "Freedom"
4. "Lift Every Voice and Sing"
5. "Formation"
6. "Sorry" / "Me, Myself and I" / "Kitty Kat"
7. "Bow Down" / "I Been On"
8. "Drunk in Love" (contains elements of "Crank That", "Lilac Wine" and "Swag Surfin")
9. "Diva" (contains elements of "Irreplaceable", "Dirt off Your Shoulder", "Headlines" and "Everybody Mad")
10. "Flawless" / "Feeling Myself"
11. "Top Off"
12. "7/11"
13. "Don't Hurt Yourself"
14. "I Care"
15. "Partition" / "Yoncé"
16. "Mi Gente (Remix)" / "Baby Boy" / "You Don't Love Me (No, No, No)" / "Hold Up" / "Countdown" / "Check on It" (contains elements of "Mine", "Standing on the Sun", "Fever", "Freaks", "Broccoli" and "Bam Bam")
17. "Déjà Vu" (with Jay-Z) (contains elements of "Green Light", "Roc Boys (And the Winner Is)...", "Zombie" and "Soul Makossa")
18. "Run the World (Girls) " (contains elements of "End of Time","Can You Feel It", "We Should All Be Feminists" and "Girl")
19. "Lose My Breath / "Say My Name" / "Soldier" (with Kelly Rowland and Michelle Williams) (contains elements of "Girl", "U Don't Know" and "Say My Name (Timbaland Remix)")
20. "Get Me Bodied" (with Solange Knowles)
21. "Single Ladies (Put a Ring on It)"
22. "Love On Top"

=== Notes ===
- J Balvin joined Beyoncé onstage during "Mi Gente" April 21. This performance was not included in the film.

== Impact and legacy ==
=== The performance ===
Following the performance, Destiny's Child sales rose by 767% and Beyoncé's by 228%, with Lemonade returning to number one on the worldwide iTunes chart, where it remained for two days. "Everybody Mad" saw a boost in sales and streams and went viral, inspiring others to do the dance. Beyoncé's custom Balmain outfit during her performances, most notably the yellow and pink Homecoming hoodie, resulted in a 58% increase in searches for Balmain hoodies after her performance. English singer Rita Ora said that she was inspired by Beyoncé's performance when trying to perfect her own performances, calling it the "real deal" and saying "When I watched that, I completely got it." English rapper Stormzy said he "scrapped" his Wireless Festival performance after seeing Beyoncé's performance, saying "if that's what Beyoncé's doing, yo, we've got to buckle up our ideas over here." Footage from the performance was featured in Google's 2020 'Most Searched: A Celebration of Black History Makers' ad as the most searched performance.

Beyoncé was the first Black woman to headline Coachella, and was set to be the second woman to headline ever, the first in a decade, until she dropped out due to her pregnancy. Vogue credited Beyoncé as ""setting the stage" for a new era of female domination" at the festival. Homecoming also inspired the comeback of Irish group Westlife, who stated that in the film "you could see how much of a captain [Beyoncé] was on her own ship." Cuban-American singer Camila Cabello said that Homecoming had a profound impact on her, and praised the significance of the performance to humanity. South Korean musician Wooseok cited Homecoming as his inspiration, praising its "quotes and lessons" and revelations of Beyoncé's "morals and work ethic". The cast of Queer Eye paid tribute to Homecoming during their performance on Lip Sync Battle. A 9-feet-tall statue of Beyoncé as seen on the Homecoming poster was unveiled at Mercedes-Benz Arena in Berlin. UCLA gymnast Nia Dennis performed a routine inspired by Homecoming, receiving a score of 9.975 as well as praise from celebrities after going viral on social media.

=== The film ===
Through the tribute to HBCU culture in Homecoming, Beyoncé increased people's interest in HBCUs. High school seniors cited Homecoming as the reason that they were considering attending HBCUs, while younger students were also said to be interested in HBCUs due to the film. American actress Regina Hall opened the BET Awards 2019 with an homage to Homecoming entitled "Homegrown", parodying the opening to Beyoncé's performance as well as the documentary sections of the film. American sitcom Grown-ish also paid homage to Homecoming.

Homecoming has been said to have set a trend of musicians releasing a film project on Netflix together with an album; Lonely Island's The Unauthorized Bash Brothers Experience, Thom Yorke's Anima, Sturgill Simpson's Sound & Fury, and Kid Cudi's Entergalactic are all cited as examples of projects that have followed the precedent that Homecoming set. Travis Scott's documentary Look Mom I Can Fly has also been cited as a film that follows in the footsteps of Homecoming. Lizzo's music video for "Good as Hell" was said to be inspired by Homecoming. Sheldon Pearce for Pitchfork wrote that Homecoming kickstarted the "ongoing uprising" where "black women have been demanding ownership of their outsized impact on culture"; Jamila Woods' LEGACY! LEGACY! and Rapsody's Eve, as well as exhibitions such as "Black Women: Power and Grace" and "Posing Modernity", are mentioned as later works that constitute the "formative syllabus" that started with Homecoming.

Canadian actress Sandra Oh dedicated her toast at the Time 100 Gala to the film, calling it "viscerally inspiring". Chelsea Clinton, in an interview with The Cut, complimented Beyoncé on working "herself body, mind, heart, soul, and spirit to get to that place" where she can perform after her difficult childbirth. American actress Sophia Bush said that with Homecoming, Beyoncé is "setting a really killer example for the creative process"." Former First Lady Michelle Obama praised Beyoncé's Homecoming, calling the film a tool to "inspire the next generation of history makers and record breakers who'll run the world in the next years ahead." The Hollywood Reporter published an essay on Homecoming by American screenwriter, producer, and actress Lena Waithe, where she praised Homecoming "a tribute to blackness" and "a love letter to historically black colleges and universities".

Many celebrations for Black History Month 2020 commemorated Homecoming. Georgia Southern University hosted a panel discussion for Black History Month on the cultural and social importance of Homecoming to African Americans. Advertising agency Momentum Worldwide (part of McCann Worldgroup) curated a "Black History Museum", which exhibited merchandise from Homecoming, while Spark Noir hosted a screening of Homecoming followed by a discussion about Beyoncé's contribution to culture. Netflix featured Homecoming under "Black Superheroes" in their Black History Month collection among comic-book heroes such as Black Panther and Luke Cage.

Music director Derek Dixie spoke on Homecoming being nominated for an Emmy Award: "(Beyoncé) has tons and tons of classic records that when putting the show together, you have to maintain the classic feel of the record but make it feel like you're in a stadium at homecoming." Ric Lipson of Stufish, who designed the pyramidal stage for Homecoming, said "we've never really won — or been nominated for even — a prestigious thing like the Emmys. We all knew this was going to be something special, but I don't think anyone realized how special." Lipson described the work on Homecoming as "a great challenge", since he needed to fulfill Beyoncé's vision "which was to evoke the aesthetic and energy of American historic black colleges, yet still look like a work of art." Stufish designed dozens of pyramid structures for the stage, with the final design "literally pushing the boundaries of what the festival would allow." This stage was also displayed at the 2019 Coachella Valley Music and Arts Festival, which the Los Angeles Times called "a living piece of Beychella history".

The Reach Opening Festival at the Kennedy Center closed with a screening of Homecoming: A Film by Beyoncé. The Museum of the Moving Image screened Homecoming as part of Curators' Choice 2019. Red Hot Arts in Australia hosted an outdoor screening of Homecoming, with singers and musicians paying tribute to the film. Balmain creative director Olivier Rousteing described Beyoncé as a visionary, saying, "She really is an inspiration — she wants to share a vision with you, and there are never any limits," and spoke on Beyoncé's opening costume, saying the team "wanted to create something truly iconic, something that instantly felt forever and timeless and historic." He also said "The strength of Beyoncé is whatever she does, a lot of people are inspired by her. [But] when you do one thing for Beyoncé, no one can have the same thing."

Tyler Perry paid homage to the performance and the documentary in his 2022 Netflix film A Madea Homecoming. In 2023, Homecoming was included in the series "Summer of Music: Concert Films 1959–2020," a retrospective of concert films exhibited by the Academy Museum of Motion Pictures in July and August 2023.

== Live album ==
Homecoming: The Live Album was released at the same time as the documentary, with no prior announcement. The album featured 36 live tracks, two spoken word interludes and two new tracks: an official release of "I Been On" and a cover of Maze's "Before I Let Go".
