= Mariel Gomerez =

American A&R, music executive, producer, songwriter

Mariel Gomerez-Rodriguez
- Born: Howard Beach, New York City, United States
- Education: St. John's University (BASc); New York University (MA)
- Musical career
- Genres: R&B; pop
- Occupations: A&R; music executive; producer; songwriter
- Labels: Atlantic; Parkwood Entertainment; Human Re Sources

Mariel Gomerez-Rodriguez is a Dominican-American music executive, A&R, producer, and songwriter. Gomerez has contributed to multiple Grammy-nominated and award-winning projects, including Beyoncé's Homecoming: The Live Album (2019), The Lion King: The Gift (2019), Renaissance (2022), and Cowboy Carter (2024), Chloe x Halle's The Kids Are Alright (2018) and Ungodly Hour (2020), Kehlani's Crash (2024), and Raye's My 21st Century Blues (2023).

== Career ==
=== Early life & musical beginnings ===
Gomerez' love of music began as a student in elementary school, using it as a coping mechanism to juggle struggling with her identity as the only Black student among her classmates from kindergarten to eighth grade as well as only speaking Spanish at home. She began to amass a large collection of CDs from her favorite artists at this time.

While completing her undergraduate studies, Gomerez became a legal and business affairs intern for Atlantic Records before moving into internship roles in branding and marketing at Roc Nation, both of which taught her multiple facets of the music business.

=== 2010s- Parkwood Entertainment ===
After Gomerez pursued a master’s degree in music business while juggling a full-time job and launching a recording studio (Times' Square's The Penthouse Studios), she decided to sell her portion of the studio and reapply to past internships, landing one in the finance department at Parkwood Entertainment. She transitioned into an A&R role during the creation of debut Chloe x Halle studio album The Kids Are Alright in 2018. In 2019, Gomerez was an A&R assistant of surprise Beyoncé album The Lion King: The Gift on Parkwood, coordinating connections between international producers and songwriters, album writing camps, and studio sessions.

=== 2020s- Kehlani, Raye & Josh Levi ===
In 2022, Gomerez co-A&R'ed Grammy-winning album Renaissance. In 2023, Gomerez A&R'ed Grammy-nominated album My 21st Century Blues after maintaining a relationship with Raye that formed during the creation of The Lion King: The Gift, helping Raye transfer to independent imprint Human Re Sources from major label Polydor in the midst of label strife. In 2024, after executive-producing Kehlani album Crash and managing Grammy-winning Beyoncé album Cowboy Carter (as well as receiving an assistant production credit on Billboard number-one single "Texas Hold 'Em"), Gomerez was nominated as one of Billboard Magazine's R&B / Hip-Hop Power Players. In 2025, Gomerez executive produced Josh Levi's debut album Hydraulic for Raedio / Atlantic Records.

== Personal life ==
Gomerez was briefly married to artist Kehlani, before Gomerez filed for an annulment of the marriage three months later citing fraud and infidelity.

== Awards and nominations ==
| Year | Ceremony | Award | Result | Ref |
|---|---|---|---|---|
| 2024 | Billboard R&B/Hip-Hop Power Players | The R&B/Hip-Hop Power Players’ Choice Award | Nominated | |
