= Flawless (Beyoncé song) =

2014 single by Beyoncé

Single by Beyoncé featuring Nicki Minaj

from the album Beyoncé: Platinum Edition
- Released: August 12, 2014
- Recorded: 2014 (Nicki Minaj remix)
- Studio: Jungle City (New York City); Kings Landing (Suffolk County, New York); Oven (New York City)
- Length: 4:10
- Label: Parkwood; Columbia
- Songwriters: Beyoncé Knowles; Terius Nash; Chauncey Hollis; Raymond DeAndre Martin; Rashad Muhammad; Onika Maraj (remix)
- Producers: Beyoncé Knowles; Hit-Boy

Beyoncé singles chronology
"Pretty Hurts" (2014)	"Flawless" (2014)	"7/11" (2014)

Nicki Minaj remix cover

Nicki Minaj singles chronology
"Low" (2014)	"Flawless Remix" (2014)	"Touchin, Lovin" (2014)

Music video
- "Flawless" on YouTube "Flawless Remix" feat. Nicki Minaj on YouTube

"Flawless" (stylized as "***Flawless") is a song by American singer Beyoncé from her fifth studio album, Beyoncé (2013). The song was written by Beyoncé, Rashad Muhammad, Terius Nash, Hit-Boy (Chauncey Hollis), and Raymond DeAndre Martin, and it was produced by Beyoncé and Hit-Boy. "Flawless" incorporates the first part of the two-part hip-hop track "Bow Down / I Been On" that Beyoncé had released in March 2013. It features an excerpt from the speech "We Should All Be Feminists" by Nigerian writer Chimamanda Ngozi Adichie at a TEDxEuston conference.

"Flawless" is built on an abrasive trap beat, and its feminist lyrics are about Beyoncé rejecting others' projections onto her and boasting her self-confidence. Upon release, "Flawless" was one of the most-discussed tracks from the album; critics generally acclaimed the production and lyricism and deemed it a highlight. The music video, directed by Jake Nava, is shot in black and white and features choreography by Les Twins and Chris Grant. It was released via the iTunes Store as part of the visual album Beyoncé on December 13, 2013.

A remix featuring rapper Nicki Minaj was released on August 12, 2014, as a single from the Platinum Edition of Beyoncé; the solo version was also subsequently released to radio. Music critics generally lauded the collaboration, and several publications included it in their lists of the best songs of 2014. "Flawless" peaked at number 41 on the US Billboard Hot 100 and has been certified triple platinum by the Recording Industry Association of America. Beyoncé included "Flawless" in the set lists of the Mrs. Carter Show World Tour (European leg, 2014), the Jay-Z co-headlining On the Run Tour (2014) and On the Run II Tour (2018), and the Formation World Tour (2016).

== Background ==
On March 17, 2013, Beyoncé released an audio track titled "Bow Down / I Been On" as well as a picture of herself as a child standing in a roomful of trophies on her official website. Hit-Boy produced the first half of the track, "Bow Down", while the second half, "I Been On", (Note: "I Been On" was later performed by the singer during the 2018 Coachella Valley Music and Arts Festival; the live recording and a studio version were then included on Homecoming: The Live Album (2019).) was produced by Timbaland. Hit-Boy stated in 2022 that he was "basically trying to make a 'Niggas in Paris', female version. With that bounce, with that synth." A sample of "I Been On" was also prominently used in an advertisement for O_{2} and The Mrs. Carter Show World Tour in February 2013. The release "shocked fans and fellow singers alike", as the song caused some controversy over its lyrical content. Kyle Anderson of Entertainment Weekly commented that Beyoncé seemed "to be attacking straw women a generation behind her who dismiss her as little more than Jay-Z's wife." The song was criticized by Rush Limbaugh and Keyshia Cole, among others.

In December 2013, Beyoncé explained the idea behind "Bow Down" on iTunes Radio: "The reason I put out 'Bow Down' is because I woke up, I went into the studio, I had a chant in my head, it was aggressive, it was angry, it wasn't the Beyoncé that wakes up every morning. It was the Beyoncé that was angry. It was the Beyoncé that felt the need to defend herself. And if the song never comes out…OK! I said it! And I listened to it after I finished, and I said, This is hot! I'mma put it out. I'm not going to sell it. I'm just going to put it out. People like it, great; they don't, they don't. And I won't do it every day because that's not who I am. But I feel strong. And anyone that says, 'Oh that is disrespectful,' just imagine the person that hates you. Imagine a person that doesn't believe in you. And look in the mirror and say, 'Bow down, bitch' and I guarantee you feel gangsta! So listen to the song from that point of view again if you didn't like it before."

Chimamanda Ngozi Adichie praised the song, stating that she "likes the idea that Beyonce's song might make girls feel that they can ask to try to do these things", and further saying: "I have had young people in Nigeria who probably would have never heard of my TED talk without Beyonce and who are now talking about feminism."

== Composition ==
"Flawless" was written by Beyoncé Knowles, Terius "The-Dream" Nash, Chauncey Hollis and Rey Reel. The song was produced by Hit-Boy and Knowles, co-produced by Rey Reel Music, with additional production by Boots. It is "a staccato, trap-flavored track" with a dirty groove and a clattering beat.

"Flawless"
"Flawless" contains samples of Beyoncé's song "Bow Down / I Been On", and Chimamanda Ngozi Adichie's speech "We should all be feminists".

The song begins with a sample from a televised talent contest Star Search, with Ed McMahon announcing the performance of Knowles' girl rap group, Girl's Tyme. Then, the song incorporates a portion of "Bow Down / I Been On", with Knowles singing about "the pressure women feel to be perfect and to think of marriage as the main goal of their life" — "I took some time to live my life/ But don’t think I’m just his little wife."

A series of samples from "We Should All Be Feminists", a speech delivered by Nigerian author Chimamanda Ngozi Adichie at a TEDxEuston conference in April 2013, starts at 1:24 and forms the second verse of the song:

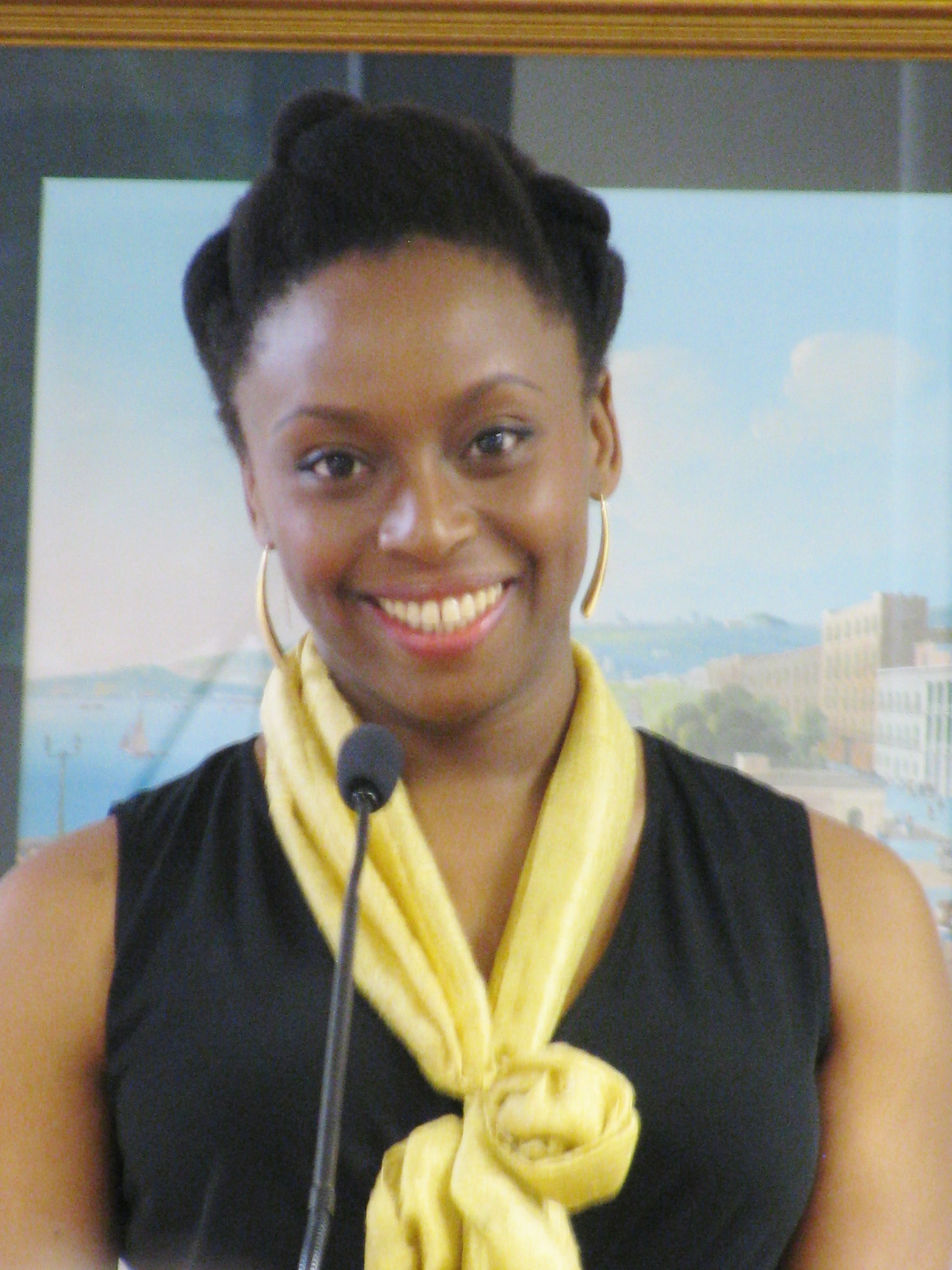
The song features a speech delivered by Nigerian writer Chimamanda Ngozi Adichie (pictured).

We teach girls to shrink themselves, to make themselves smaller. We say to girls, 'You can have ambition, but not too much.

You should aim to be successful, but not too successful. Otherwise you will threaten the man.'

Because I am female, I am expected to aspire to marriage. I am expected to make my life choices always keeping in mind that marriage is the most important. Now marriage can be a source of joy and love and mutual support. But why do we teach girls to aspire to marriage and we don’t teach boys the same? We raise girls to see each other as competitors – not for jobs or for accomplishments, which I think can be a good thing, but for the attention of men. We teach girls that they cannot be sexual beings in the way that boys are. Feminist: the person who believes in the social, political and economic equality of the sexes.

The third verse features lyrics such as "You wake up, flawless/ Post up, flawless/ Ride round in it, flawless/ I woke up like this/ I woke up like this." The song ends with another sample from Star Search, in which McMahon announces that Knowles' group lost the competition. In a video commentary to the album, Knowles explained that in her mind [as a nine-year-old], she would have never imagined losing as a possibility, and it was the best message for her. "I feel like something about the aggression of 'Bow Down' and the attitude of 'Flawless'—the reality is, sometimes you lose. And you're never too good to lose, you're never too big to lose, you're never too smart to lose, it happens. And it happens when it needs to happen. And you have to embrace those things", she added.

== Critical reception ==
"Flawless" was met with mostly positive reviews, while its lyrics were widely discussed and acclaimed by the public. Los Angeles Times's Carolyn Kellogg wrote that the inclusion of Adichie's talk was an "astonishing" thing. Rebecca Nicholson of The Guardian commented that by using Adichie's TED talk as a feminist spoken word interlude in the middle of "Flawless", the singer put "Bow Down" into a different context. Andrew Hampp and Erika Ramirez of Billboard magazine wrote, "When we first heard the Hit-Boy produced track in March it didn't contain the content of the full-version, only to come off abrasive. 'Flawless' though, with the insightful commentary of feminism by Nigerian writer Chimamanda Ngozi Adichie, carries power and highlights camaraderie amongst women."

The Guardian's Mikki Kendall wrote, "In 'Flawless' (a track that leaked as 'Bow Down' over the summer), Beyonce quotes from author Chimamanda Ngozi Adichie's TedX talk 'We should all be feminists', adroitly addressing the idea that she is somehow anti-feminist for not fitting into the boxes others project onto her. It's clear that like a lot of black American women, the mainstream middle class white feminist narratives with which we are so familiar aren't necessarily compatible with Beyonce's view of herself. This album makes it clear that her feminism isn't academic; isn't about waves, or labels. It simply is a part of her as much as anything else in her life. She's pro-woman without being anti-man, and she wants the world to know that you can be feminist on a personal level without sacrificing emotions, friendships or fun."

However, Catherine A. Traywick of Foreign Policy magazine criticized the singer, commenting that "On a track called 'Flawless', Beyonce samples Adichie's April 2013 Ted Talk, which is a thoughtful, amusing examination of subtle sexism in everyday life. Beyonce bookends Adichie's words with distinctly less thoughtful lyrics of her own: She shallowly trumpets material wealth and physical beauty and, working in a few lines from her spring single, advises others to 'Bow down, bitches.'" She continued, "Beyonce gives us a heavily-edited, watered-down version of Adichie's speech that aligns with the singer's banal brand of beginner feminism: She reduces Adichie's powerful message to an overly simplistic, inoffensive pro-girl anthem that does little to challenge trenchant gender ideals." In the annual Pazz & Jop mass critics poll of the year's best in music in 2013, "Flawless" was ranked at number 72. The following year, "Flawless" was ranked at number nine on the same poll for the best music of 2014, tied with DJ Snake and Lil Jon's "Turn Down for What". Pitchfork Media named it the 7th best track of 2014. Slant Magazine listed the single as the 23rd best one of 2014, while Tiny Mix Tapes also considered the release one of the best songs of the same period.

== Chart performance ==
Without being released as a single, "Flawless" managed to appear on several music charts. In the US, it peaked at number 13 on February 15, 2014 on the Bubbling Under Hot 100 Singles chart which acts as a 25-song extension of the main Billboard Hot 100. The same week, on the US Hot R&B/Hip-Hop Songs chart, the song peaked at number 32 in its fourth week of charting. Elsewhere, it peaked at number 157 on the UK Singles Chart on March 8, 2014 and 77 on the Irish Singles Chart on March 13. Following the performance at the 2014 MTV Video Music Awards, "Flawless" debuted at number 82 on the Billboard Hot 100 and moved to a peak position of 25 on the Hot R&B/Hip-Hop Songs chart for the issue dated September 13, 2014. Selling 29,000 digital copies, it entered the Hot Digital Songs chart at number 48. Following the first week of the remix's availability as a digital download as part of the Platinum Edition release, the song reached new peaks of 41 and 12 on the Hot 100 and Hot R&B/Hip-Hop Songs, respectively; it sold 67,000 that week, 91 percent of which were of the remix.

== Music video ==
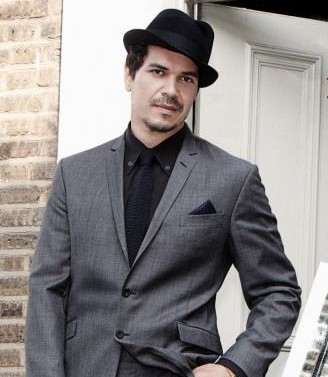
Jake Nava directed the music video.

A music video for "Flawless" was directed by Jake Nava. It was released on December 13, 2013 on the album Beyoncé on the iTunes Store, which contained a video for every song. Beyoncé worked on the choreography for the video with Les Twins and Chris Grant. "We had done half the video, and we watched it, and Beyoncé knew that it needed a dance moment that would be iconic, that people could pick up on. And then we went back and reshot that part. Because after seeing the video, and after the song coming together, she was like, 'This needs a cool dance that anybody can do'", said Beyoncé's creative director Todd Tourso.

The video opens with original footage from Star Search, with young Beyoncé and other members of Girl's Tyme being announced by McMahon. It transitions to other scenes shot in black-and-white, showing Beyoncé headbanging and moshing with members of a punk subculture, as well as dancing with a team of street dancers in a graffiti covered alley. Throughout the video, she is seen lip-syncing the lyrics of the song and moving in accordance with its melody while the camera focuses only on her. Many of the scenes are also shot using the slow motion filming technique. It ends with McMahon announcing the winners of Star Search, Skeleton Crew, which receive four stars from the judges of the show, while Girl's Tyme receive three stars, losing the competition.

Nate Jones of People magazine commented that the lyrics of the song were "best performed with the hand gestures seen in the video." Whitney Phaneuf of the website HitFix wrote that the video had the best choreographed dance on the whole album, further adding that it would leave viewers wanting to learn the dance routine. Brandon Soderberg of Vice noted that "black punk faces in 'Flawless' correct the rockist white boy narrative around punk rock." Jenna Wortham of The New York Times wrote that the release of the album had created "a social media class of its own, generating a sort of ripple effect that is keeping the album front and center in the Web’s ephemeral consciousness", and identified shots from the "Flawless" music video as some of the most shared among fans: "A recent hashtag search for Instagram photos and videos tagged 'I woke up like this', a reference to one of the catchier songs on the album, turns up close to 7,000 photos." On May 7, 2014, a video was uploaded on Vimeo called #everyBODYisflawless featuring plus-size fashion bloggers and models Gabi Gregg, Nadia Aboulhosn and Tess Munster lip-synching and dancing to the song.

== Live performances ==
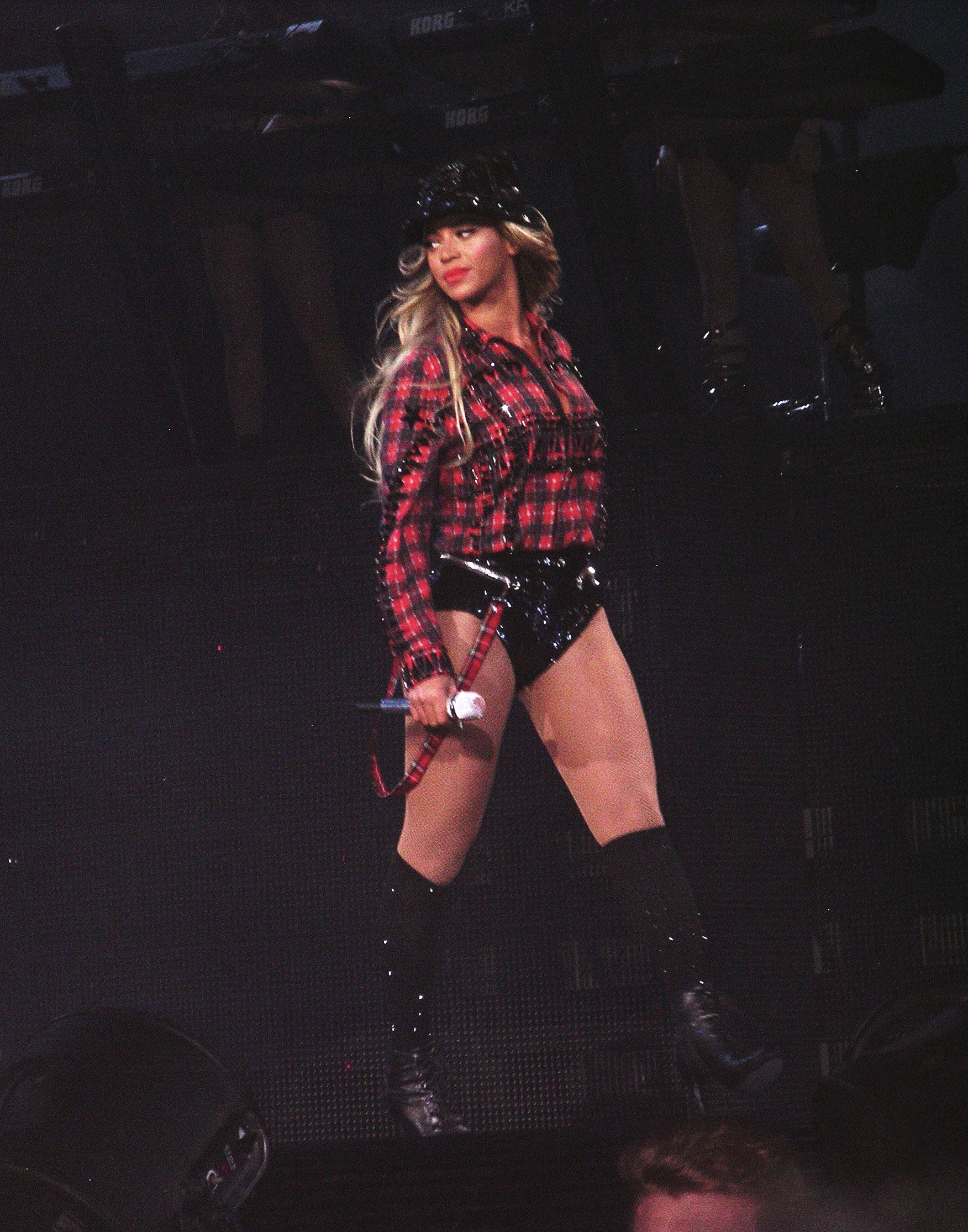
Beyoncé performed "Flawless" during the European leg of the Mrs. Carter Show World Tour in 2014.

The song was added to the set list and performed live during the second European leg of The Mrs. Carter Show World Tour, with the first performance taking place in Glasgow at the SSE Hydro arena on February 20, 2014. After "Run the World (Girls)", the performance of the song opened with the words from Adichie's talk being displayed on a screen on the stage with a large lit-up font. Beyoncé appeared on stage during the beginning of the song and performed a choreography taken from the song's music video along with her background dancers. She was also dressed in the same way as in the clip with a bedazzled plaid button-up shirt, a cat-ear baseball cap and short leather hot-pants. Writing for The Daily Telegraph, Isabel Mohan noted that while performed live, the "booty-shaking" song "turns into a huge, powerful urban pop hit". While describing the performance as "an exercise in sheer sass", The Independent's David Pollock described the singer's style as "retro Bronx street chic". He praised her for "burning onstage" and felt that the "commanding" lines executed during the chorus was the "'I am what I am' for the 2010s." Graeme Virtue of The Guardian felt that unlike the studio recording of the song, it became an "all-out sonic and visual assault" when performed live. A professionally recorded live performance of the song was broadcast in July 2014 on Beyonce: X10, an HBO series documenting renditions of the song performed during The Mrs. Carter Show World Tour. Anna Silman of Vulture praised the singer's dancing and her "wild" costumes. "Flawless" was also part of the set list of Beyoncé and Jay-Z's co-headlining On the Run Tour (2014). Lorraine Ali of the Los Angeles Times felt that the singer's vocals managed to hit every note and praised her dance moves.

"Flawless" was performed live by Beyoncé during the 2014 MTV Video Music Awards on August 25, as part of a medley consisting of songs from her self-titled album. The rendition of the song came towards the end of her set list, following an interlude of "Superpower". Adichie's words began appearing on the screen on the stage with bold, pink letters and background dancers started appearing on the dark stage. At the end of the speech, the word "feminist" in capital letters was flashed on the screen and the singer was seen next to it in a silhouette. As she launched into the song, Beyoncé asked the crowd "How did you wake up this morning?". Towards the end of the performance, a line from the remix version featuring Nicki Minaj was heard in the background and the singer immediately continued with a performance of "Yoncé". Throughout the entire performance, she was dressed in a jeweled bodysuit. Nadeska Alexis, writing for MTV News praised the bold, feminist statements made during "Flawless" and felt that Beyoncé changed the soulful vibes of the other songs for "all out breaking-it-down". Eliana Dockterman of Time magazine considered the performance of the song to be a peak of the singer's medley and praised its feminist theme for being presented to an audience consisting mostly of teenagers. Following the song's live performance at the VMAs, its sales in the US increased by 1,237% the next week.

== Remixes ==
In March 2014, rapper M.I.A. posted several videos on her Instagram account during which a remix of "Flawless" was played. Two months later, on May 13, she released an officially commissioned remix of the song titled "Baddygirl 2". M.I.A.'s version was produced by Party Squad, contained modified lyrics and samples of Beyoncé's "Diva" and "Run the World (Girls)". It explored elements of trap and EDM music. Some of the reworked lines contained feminist messages and elements of the original song were completely altered. John Walker, writing for MTV News remarked that except the opening lines "I woke up like this/ I went to bed like this/ We do everything just like this", the remix doesn't contain "any easily recognizable bits" of the original. Similarly, a writer of Fact magazine noted that Beyoncé did not want to release the remix as it only contained the same feminist elements of the original. Zach Frydenlund of Complex felt that the reworked version contained M.I.A.'s "intense energy" while Sharan Shetty found a "manic", high-energy sound similar to the rapper's diverse influences. However the latter concluded that the remix "doesn't quite measure up to the original, but... regardless, it's an interesting and head-bopping take". The Guardian editor Alexandra Khan-Anselmo felt that the remix is "good enough to make you want to smash the window of a cop car, pull a Wynona or sneak on to the underground".

On August 4, 2014 rapper Lil' Kim posted an unofficial remix of the song. Lil' Kim released her remix after the official remix of the song featuring Nicki Minaj was released. Her version was a diss track directed at Minaj for Minaj calling herself "the queen of rap," a title that has been hotly contested by a number of women in rap over the years. It contained the same lines by Beyoncé from the official remix and several of Minaj's verses.

== Remix featuring Nicki Minaj ==
A remix of "Flawless" featuring rapper Nicki Minaj, entitled "Flawless Remix", was released on Beyoncé's website on August 2, 2014. Columbia Records released this version as a single on August 12, 2014, impacting radio in the United States. The remix version of the song features newly added verses and explicit lyrics by both Beyoncé and Minaj and marks their first collaboration. Its music was also slightly modified with several parts being reorganized and changed. The lyrics in which Beyoncé sings about the infamous elevator incident between her husband Jay-Z and her sister Solange Knowles received media attention. The song peaked at number 41 on the US Billboard Hot 100 after being released as a digital download, included in the reissued version of Beyoncé, subtitled Platinum Edition.

=== Background and release ===
On August 2, 2014, the official remix of the song featuring rapper Nicki Minaj was released unexpectedly on Beyoncé's official website which marked their first collaboration. Two months prior to the release of the song, Minaj's manager Gee Roberson contacted her to inform her that Beyoncé wanted a remix of "Flawless" on which she would be featured. Following this, Beyoncé sent Minaj a new version she wanted and told Minaj, "I want you to be you. I don't want you to hold back.", according to the rapper. Minaj began writing the verse in New York and Beyoncé visited her in the studio, encouraging her. Beyoncé later revealed to Minaj that she would release the song sometime during her On the Run Tour. Following this both of the artists began sending each other photos of themselves to create the song's artwork.

=== Composition ===
Musically, the remix was noted for being a slower version of the original and containing new, sexually explicit verses. The music of "Flawless" is mostly kept the same as the original, with the sound being slightly altered and several parts reorganized. It also contains a sample from the horns of Outkast's song "Spottieottiedopaliscious". The remix opens with Beyoncé speak-singing lines about sex: "It's that Yoncé, your Yoncé in that lingerie, on that chardonnay, scoring touchdowns on your runway." Her accent during the verse was noted to be West Indian and similar to Rihanna. The remix addresses the infamous elevator altercation between Beyoncé's sister Solange Knowles and Beyoncé's husband Jay-Z after the 2014 Met Gala. Beyoncé raps in the song with her higher vocal register, "Of course sometimes shit go down when it's a billion dollars on the elevator", repeating the line twice, followed by a sound of a cash register dinging and the singer laughing, referring to her and her husband's combined billion-dollar net-worth. She also addresses her detractors through the lines "You can say what you want/I'm the shit" adopting a softer voice.

Minaj starts rapping at the two minutes and thirty three seconds mark of the song, with a rapid-fire delivery using a low timbre. Her lyrics reference the work with Kanye West on the song "Monster", her success and compare detractors with Michael Jackson's convicted doctor through numerous punch lines. She also raps the lines "The queen of rap slaying with Queen B / if you ain't on the team / you're playing for team D" during the end of her lines. Minaj's vocal delivery was compared to her earlier work on "Monster".

=== Critical reception ===
Caitlin White writing for MTV News felt that the version "more than exceeds our expectations" and added that it managed to expand "flawlessness beyond women at this juncture". Nadeska Alexis of the same publication wrote that Beyoncé sounded "extra fearless" together with Minaj. Pitchfork Media's Evan Minsker referred to the remix as "like a gift from the heavens" as it featured the two singers together on a song. Vulture's writer E. Alex Jung called the pair's first collaboration "epic". Melinda Newman, a writer of HitFix, felt that the reworked version "brings... up to speed" compared to the original, but noted that Minaj's lyrics discussing Jackson's doctor would likely upset his fans. Slate editor Sharan Shetty described it as "excellent", praising the duo as a "powerful pair". Jason Lipshutz of Billboard magazine praised Beyoncé's line addressing the elevator accident as a highlight of the remix. Time reviewer Nolan Feeney deemed the remix a "feistier, more aggressive take" on the original, while also adding that it had a different message, "talk all you want, you'll never wake up like them". A writer of Rap-Up magazine felt that Minaj delivered one of "her best verses yet". Sasha Frere-Jones, a critic of The New Yorker felt that unlike the original version, the remix is "flawless... because it is conceptually coherent and ferocious, and neither performer makes a mistake", noting that Beyoncé outshined Minaj's performance. He concluded his review by stating that "the synergy of the 'Flawless' remix hits a peak of cultural importance". Time Magazine, in its year-end "Top Ten" series, named "Flawless Remix" the Best Song of 2014. The song was placed at number seven on Billboard's 10 Best Songs of 2014 list. Entertainment Weekly also included the single on their ranking of the best songs of 2014 at number 2, while Spin at number 36.

=== Live performances ===
During the concert in Paris, France as part of the On the Run Tour on September 12 and 13, 2014, Minaj joined Beyoncé onstage to perform the remix of "Flawless" live. Both singers were dressed in clothes designed by Versace's Versus. Jocely Vena writing for Billboard described the performance as "[f]lawless indeed". Lewis Corner in a review for the Digital Spy felt that Minaj "bolster[ed] its [the song's strong feminist message] weight with her tight rhymes". During an interview with radio station SkyRock FM, Minaj revealed that she felt honored and emotional to perform together with Beyoncé and acknowledged that she was surprised by the positive reaction of the audience when she appeared. The live video of the song which was featured on the HBO special On the Run Tour: Beyoncé and Jay Z was released on Beyoncé's Vevo account on October 6, 2014. Minaj also performed her verse of the song at the 2014 iHeartRadio Music Festival where she sang a cappella during the last part of it.

Beyoncé has performed this song during her all-stadium Formation (2016) and On the Run II (2018, co-headlined with Jay-Z) tours as a mash-up with her and Minaj’s second collaboration, “Feeling Myself”. In the middle of the mash-up, during the break between the two songs, she would often ask the crowd to repeat the phrases “I woke up like this” and “I’m feeling myself”. She performed a similar mash-up during her 2018 Coachella performance. The performance was subsequently included in the 2019 Homecoming film and live album.

=== Charts ===
==== Weekly charts ====
Chart performance for "Flawless" (Remix)
Chart (2014)	Peak position
Belgium Urban (Ultratop Flanders)	45
France (SNEP)	83

=== Certifications ===
Certifications for "Flawless" (Remix)
Region	Certification	Certified units/sales
Australia (ARIA)	Gold	35,000^{‡}
United Kingdom (BPI)	Silver	200,000^{‡}
^{‡} Sales+streaming figures based on certification alone.

== Impact ==
The lyric "I woke up like this" from the song has entered popular culture. The phrase inspired a viral trend "in which the subject takes a selfie right after they wake up," generated over five million hashtags. It is also used to refer to a fresh or natural look.

== Personnel ==
Credits adapted from Beyoncé's website.

- Beyoncé – vocals, production, vocal production
- Hit-Boy – production
- Rey Reel Music – co-production
- Boots – additional production, additional arranging
- Stuart White – recording, mixing
- Jordan "DJ Swivel" Young – recording
- Ramon Rivas – second engineering
- Rob Suchecki – second engineering
- Tyler Scott – assistant engineering
- Tony Maserati – mixing
- Justin Hergett – mix engineering
- James Krausse – mix engineering
- Derek Dixie – mix consultation
- Tom Coyne – mastering
- Aya Marrill – mastering

== Charts ==
=== Weekly charts ===
Chart performance for "Flawless"
Chart (2014)	Peak position
Australia Urban (ARIA)	15
Belgium (Ultratip Bubbling Under Flanders)	89
Belgium Urban (Ultratop Flanders)	34
Canada Hot 100 (Billboard)	88
France (SNEP)	161
Ireland (IRMA)	77
UK Singles (Official Charts)	65
UK Hip Hop/R&B (Official Charts)	6
US Billboard Hot 100	41
US Hot R&B/Hip-Hop Songs (Billboard)	12
US R&B/Hip-Hop Airplay (Billboard)	5
US Rhythmic Airplay (Billboard)	13

=== Year-end charts ===
Chart (2014)	Position
US Hot R&B/Hip-Hop Songs (Billboard)	69

== Certifications ==
Certifications for "Flawless"
Region	Certification	Certified units/sales
Australia (ARIA)	Gold	35,000^{‡}
Brazil (Pro-Música Brasil) "Bow Down" Homecoming Live Version	Platinum	40,000^{‡}
Brazil (Pro-Música Brasil) "Flawless/Feeling Myself" Homecoming Live Version	Gold	20,000^{‡}
Brazil (Pro-Música Brasil) "I Been On" Homecoming Live Version	Gold	20,000^{‡}
Canada (Music Canada)	Platinum	80,000^{‡}
New Zealand (RMNZ)	Platinum	30,000^{‡}
United Kingdom (BPI)	Silver	200,000^{‡}
United States (RIAA)	3× Platinum	3,000,000^{‡}
^{‡} Sales+streaming figures based on certification alone.

== Release history ==
Region	Date	Format	Label	Ref.
United States	August 12, 2014	Rhythmic contemporary radio (Nicki Minaj remix)	Parkwood; Columbia	
United States	August 16, 2014	Urban contemporary radio (Nicki Minaj remix)	Parkwood; Columbia	
United States	August 19, 2014	Rhythmic contemporary radio	Parkwood; Columbia	
Italy	October 10, 2014	Contemporary hit radio (Nicki Minaj remix)	Sony	
