= Jamboree (Fast Life Yungstaz album) =

Studio album by Fast Life Yungstaz
- Released: June 23, 2009
- Recorded: 2008–2009
- Genre: Hip-hop
- Length: 50:33
- Label: Def Jam; Music Line Entertainment
- Producer: Aone Beats; DJ Spinz; Dre Day Beatz; FRE$H; Jim Jonsin; K.E. on the Track; L.T. Moe; Nard & B; Nicholas "N.B." Bailey; Schife Karbeen

Singles from Jamboree
- 1. "Swag Surfin'" Released: March 24, 2009

Professional ratings
Review scores
Source	Rating
Allmusic	3.5/5 stars

Jamboree is the only studio album by American hip-hop group Fast Life Yungstaz, released on June 23, 2009, under Def Jam Recordings The album sold under 3,800 copies in its first week. To date, the album has sold 14,000 copies in total.

== Singles ==
"Swag Surfin'" is the first single from the album. It peaked at number 62 on the Billboard Hot 100, number 13 on the Hot R&B/Hip-Hop Songs chart, and at number 7 on the Hot Rap Tracks.

== Track listing ==
No.	Title	Producer(s)	Length
1.	"Jamboree"	Aone Beats	2:36
2.	"Bands"	K.E. on the Track; Schife Karbeen	4:06
3.	"Swag Surfin"	K.E. on the Track	4:09
4.	"Party Time" (featuring Band Geakz)	K.E. on the Track	4:57
5.	"Mr. Lenox" (featuring Young Dro)	K.E. on the Track	5:32
6.	"Gotta Be" (featuring Stuey Rock)	K.E. on the Track	4:28
7.	"Across the Globe" (featuring Sammie)	L.T. Moe; Jim Jonsin	3:38
8.	"Mounted Up"	Nicholas "N.B." Bailey	4:40
9.	"Prada Walkin'"	K.E. on the Track	3:04
10.	"Sauced Up"	DJ Spinz; FRE$H; Nard & B	3:28
11.	"Better Days" (featuring Dear Jayne)	Dre Day Beatz	5:46
12.	"Stop Hatin' 09"	DJ Spinz; FRE$H	4:13

== Chart positions ==
Chart(2009)	Peak position
U.S. Billboard 200	109
U.S. Billboard Top R&B/Hip-Hop Albums	13
U.S. Billboard Top Rap Albums	3
