= Feeling Myself (Nicki Minaj song) =

Song by Nicki Minaj featuring Beyoncé

from the album The Pinkprint
- Released: December 15, 2014
- Recorded: 2014
- Studio: Glenwood Place Studios (Burbank, CA)
- Genre: Hip hop
- Length: 3:58
- Label: Young Money; Cash Money; Republic
- Songwriters: Onika Maraj; Solána Rowe; Chauncey Hollis, Jr.; Beyoncé Knowles
- Producer: Hit-Boy

"Feeling Myself" is a song by Trinidadian rapper Nicki Minaj featuring American singer Beyoncé from Minaj's third studio album, The Pinkprint (2014). It was written by Minaj, SZA, Beyoncé, and Hit-Boy and produced by Hit-Boy with additional vocal production by Beyoncé. "Feeling Myself" is a hip hop song backed by a West Coast synth, driving bass and drums.

== Background and recording ==
In May 2014, Minaj's manager Gee Roberson contacted her to inform her that Beyoncé wanted a remix of "Flawless" on which she would be featured. Following this, Beyoncé sent Minaj a new version of the song she wanted and told Minaj, "I want you to be you. I don't want you to hold back." Minaj agreed to do the song with her and in return Beyoncé would be featured on The Pinkprint. Singer-songwriter SZA was enlisted to co-write parts of the song. She was called and later went to the studio to meet and work with the song's producer, Hit-Boy. During the studio session, SZA wrote the song's lyrics whilst Hit-boy produced it.

According to Minaj's audio engineer, Aubry "Big Juice" Delaine, when Minaj first heard the beat, she was "crazy" about it. The final mixing took place around November 2014, right before the album had to be handed in. Delaine recalls, "it was crunch time. Hit-Boy, on the spot, added those hard 808 drums in the middle of the song." The song was then sent over to Beyoncé and her engineer Stuart White for her full vocals, with White ending up mixing the song. Delaine said when they sent the song back, "that's when Beyoncé put her sauce on it and all of her extra vocals. We listened to that and knew that song was out of here".

== Composition ==
The song's beat is built over a West Coast synth, driving bass and drums along with bells and whistles incorporated into the production. The song contains rough edges, with high winding synths and intense lyrics that revolve around both Minaj and Beyoncé "bragging" about themselves.

== Music video ==
On May 18, 2015, the music video premiered exclusively on music streaming service Tidal. It features the two singers in various scenes at Coachella and several other locations. It also features Beyoncé in a Nebraska Cornhuskers hoodie. In June 2015, Billboard named "Feeling Myself" video as one of the 10 best music videos of the first half of 2015.

On February 3, 2015, an audio video for the song was uploaded to Minaj's official YouTube channel, which as of February 2025, has surpassed 150 million views.

== Reception ==
Pitchfork named the song "Best New Track" of the day, with Molly Beauchemin commenting that "Nicki Minaj is the only woman who can get Beyoncé to do her bidding. When a woman capable of 'stopping the world' tells you to 'carry on', there's no choice but to bring it." Additionally, Pitchfork named "Feeling Myself" the 13th best music video of 2015.

Despite not being sent to radio as an official single from the album, "Feeling Myself" peaked at number 39 on the US Billboard Hot 100 chart, staying in the top 100 for 20 weeks. As of December 2017, the song has sold 474,261 copies in the US.

== Live performances ==
On July 24, 2015, Nicki Minaj performed "Feeling Myself" on Good Morning America's Summer Concert Series. Minaj also performed the song during The Pinkprint Tour. On October 20, 2015, Minaj and Beyoncé performed the song at the Tidal X1020 Charity Concert at the Barclays Center. Beyoncé has also performed this song on the Formation and On the Run II tours as well as her 2018 Coachella performance as a mashup with "Flawless Remix".

== Charts ==
| Chart (2014–2015) | Peak position |
|---|---|
| Australia (ARIA) | 52 |
| Belgium (Ultratip Bubbling Under Flanders) | 75 |
| Belgium Urban (Ultratop Flanders) | 42 |
| Canada Hot 100 (Billboard) | 67 |
| France (SNEP) | 53 |
| Scotland Singles (Official Charts) | 40 |
| UK Singles (Official Charts) | 64 |
| UK Hip Hop/R&B (Official Charts) | 12 |
| US Billboard Hot 100 | 39 |
| US Hot R&B/Hip-Hop Songs (Billboard) | 12 |

== Certifications ==
| Region | Certification | Certified units/sales |
|---|---|---|
| Australia (ARIA) | 2× Platinum | 140,000^{‡} |
| Brazil (Pro-Música Brasil) | Platinum | 60,000^{‡} |
| New Zealand (RMNZ) | Platinum | 30,000^{‡} |
| United Kingdom (BPI) | Gold | 400,000^{‡} |
| United States (RIAA) | 2× Platinum | 2,000,000^{‡} |
^{‡} Sales+streaming figures based on certification alone.
