= Swag Surfin =

2009 single by Fast Life Youngstaz

Single by Fast Life Yungstaz

from the album Jamboree
- Released: March 24, 2009
- Recorded: 2008
- Genre: Hip-hop; trap; futuristic swag
- Length: 4:15
- Label: Island Def Jam Music Group
- Producer: K.E. on the Track

"Swag Surfin" is the debut single by American hip-hop group Fast Life Yungstaz, released in 2009. It is featured on their debut album Jamboree and was produced by K.E. on the Track. The song was certified platinum in March 2024.

== Cultural impact ==
Since its release in 2009, "Swag Surfin'" has grown in popularity, especially among the black community, and has been played at weddings, graduations, parties, homecoming events, and others. The dance is well-regarded as it encourages friends and strangers to connect with each other by linking arms and swaying from side to side. Brianna Younger of The New Yorker stated that "there are no strangers when those horn blasts sound, only you and a crowd of people who have suddenly become your closest friends—your brothers and sisters." The song and dance are commonplace at celebrations at HBCUs (Historically Black Colleges and Universities). The song was sampled by Beyoncé for her Coachella performance Homecoming: The Live Album with the song "Drunk in Love". The song has also been played at the White House. Khalila Douze of uDiscoverMusic wrote that "["Swag Surfin'"] is an embodiment of black fellowship and faith, and that's what makes it so timeless."

== Usage in sports ==
It is the unofficial anthem of the Women's National Basketball Association (WNBA)'s Washington Mystics and was played at the game in which the team won its first championship. "Swag Surfin'" also became synonymous with the Chicago Bears' post-game locker room celebration, nicknamed "Club Dub", under head coach Matt Nagy in 2018 and 2019. "Swag Surfin'" is also often played by the Auburn Tigers football team during big games, dating back to at least 2017.

"Swag Surfin'" gained wide attention for being played at Kansas City Chiefs home game victories at Arrowhead Stadium at the request of the players during their 2023 season and playoff run. Taylor Swift was captured by cameras dancing along to the song with Donna Kelce, Brittany Mahomes, and other Chiefs fans during the team's AFC Wild Card Playoff game in GEHA Field at Arrowhead Stadium.

== Remixes ==
DJ Self put together a remix that features American rappers Fabolous, Juelz Santana, Red Cafe, and Maino. Lil Wayne recorded a freestyle for his mixtape No Ceilings.

== Music video ==
The original viral music video was filmed and directed by Forrest Tuff of One Vision Productions and released online January 2009, receiving millions of views. A new version under Def Jam South was released online in October 2009. Kia Shine and Stuey Rock make cameo appearances.

== Charts ==
=== Weekly charts ===
Chart (2009)	Peak position
U.S. Billboard Hot 100	62
U.S. Billboard Hot R&B/Hip-Hop Songs	12
U.S. Billboard Hot Rap Tracks	7

=== Year-end charts ===
Chart (2009)	Position
US Hot R&B/Hip-Hop Songs (Billboard)	64

== Certifications ==
Region	Certification	Certified units/sales
United States (RIAA)	Platinum	1,000,000^{‡}
^{‡} Sales+streaming figures based on certification alone.
