= Fast Life Yungstaz =

American hip hop group

F.L.Y.
- Origin: Stone Mountain, Georgia, United States
- Genre: Hip hop
- Years active: 2009–present
- Label: Def Jam Recordings
- Members: Myko McFly; Vee; Mook
- Website: F.L.Y. (Fast Life Yungstaz) on MySpace Music

Fast Life Yungstaz (also known by its acronym F.L.Y.) is an American hip hop trio from Stone Mountain, Georgia. The group is composed of Myko McFly, Vee and Mook. The group's debut album, Jamboree, was released on June 23, 2009. The album peaked at number 109 on the Billboard 200 and spawned their singular Billboard Hot 100 hit "Swag Surfin".

== Discography ==
=== Albums ===
| Year | Title | Chart positions | | |
| Year | Title | Billboard 200 | Billboard Top R&B/Hip-Hop Albums | Billboard Top Rap Albums |
|---|---|---|---|---|
| 2009 | Jamboree: 1st studio album; Released: June 23, 2009; Formats: CD, digital download | 109 | 13 | 3 |

=== Mixtapes ===
- 2010: Mile Hi Club (hosted by DJ Pretty Boy Tank and DJ Geronimo)
- 2010: Auto-Pilot (hosted by DJ Pretty Boy Tank)

=== Singles ===
| Year | Single | Chart positions | | | Certifications | Album |
| Year | Single | Billboard Hot 100 | BillboardHot R&B/Hip-Hop Songs | BillboardHot Rap Tracks | Certifications | Album |
|---|---|---|---|---|---|---|
| 2009 | "Swag Surfin" | 62 | 12 | 7 | RIAA: Platinum | Jamboree |
| 2010 | "Out Yo League" | - | 84 | - | | Non-album single |
