= Nadia Aboulhosn =

American fashion blogger, model, and designer

- Born: September 13, 1988 (age 38); Orlando, Florida, U.S.
- Occupations: Model, Blogger, Clothing Designer
- Years active: 2010–present
- Modelling information
- Height: 5 ft 3 in (160 cm)
- Hair colour: Brown
- Eye colour: Brown
- Website: www.nadiaaboulhosn.com

Nadia Aboulhosn (born September 13, 1988) is an American fashion blogger, plus-size model, and designer known for promoting a healthy lifestyle and body image.

== Career ==
Aboulhosn was raised in a Lebanese-American household in Orlando. In 2011, she won American Apparel's XL Model Search, which led to her first photo shoot, for Seventeen Magazine. She then moved to New York and worked at an office job while building an online following. In 2014, her blog had 160,000 Instagram followers.

By 2015, that number had risen to 350,000. After being rejected by the Fashion Institute of Technology, she approached the Canadian plus-size retailer Addition Elle about a collaboration. She appeared in lingerie ads for the company and, in 2015, designed a collection for its Love and Legend brand. In 2014, Aboulhosn had become the brand ambassador for the British fashion brand BooHoo and, in 2015, designed a collection for the company.

Aboulhosn had begun playing football in the 8th grade, when she also became a runner. In 2016, she made the cover of Women's Running Magazine. She has also appeared in Vogue Italia, Complex Magazine, Marie Claire, Redbook and BuzzFeed.

In 2016, Abhoulson became a Good Squad judge for the fashion brand Good American. In 2017, she moved to Los Angeles and launched her own clothing line, By Nadia Aboulhosn. In 2019, she began designing footwear for the brand Fashion To Figure.

Abhoulson is married, with a daughter born in 2014. She lives in Florida. As of 2026, she has 783,000 Instagram followers.

== See also ==
- List of Druze
