= Plastic Off the Sofa =

Song by Beyoncé

from the album Renaissance
- Released: July 29, 2022
- Studio: Sing Mastering (Atlanta); Avenue A West; Juicy Juicy; Kings Landing West; Parkwood West (Los Angeles)
- Genre: Neo-soul
- Length: 4:14
- Label: Parkwood; Columbia
- Songwriters: Beyoncé; Sydney Bennett; Sabrina Claudio; Nick Green; Patrick Paige II
- Producers: Beyoncé; Syd

Lyric video
- "Plastic Off the Sofa" on YouTube

"Plastic Off the Sofa" is a song recorded by American singer Beyoncé for her seventh studio album Renaissance. Lauded for its "sun-dappled L.A. sound", "lilting bass and sunny guitars", laidback groove, "glowing neo-soul", and melismatic vocals, the song would later win the Grammy Award for Best Traditional R&B Performance at the 65th Annual Grammy Awards in 2023, becoming Beyoncé's third win in the category, tying her with Lalah Hathaway for most wins.

== Background and composition ==
"Plastic Off the Sofa" is a neo-soul song. It was written by Beyoncé, Sydney Bennett, Sabrina Claudio, Nick Green, and Patrick Paige II. Variety described the song's lyrical/sonic composition as a "neo-soul ode to her husband that flaunts Beyonce’s signature feathery vocals", as well as "the closest thing to a ballad on Renaissance".

== Reception ==
"Plastic Off The Sofa" was met with rave reviews. Wesley Morris of The New York Times lauded the song for its vocal melismas and bassline, described as "waves of rhapsodically long, Olympic-level emissions... [that] seem to emanate from somewhere way beyond a human throat: The ocean? The oven?.. The bass line keeps swelling and curving and blooming till it outgrows its flower bed, and Beyoncé’s voice does, too. It surfs the swells. It smells the roses." On the Rolling Stone list of The 70 Greatest Beyoncé Songs, the song was placed at number twenty. Reviewer Mosi Reeves highlighted the "warm, soulful earthiness" that Beyonce utilized to delve into "a sun-dappled L.A. sound that has defined alternative R&B for the past several years." Vulture compared her "whispery upper register" to Donna Summer, highlighting "airy disco sonics". Slant Magazine characterized the song as "subdued, but moving with a kinetic energy." Both the Los Angeles Times and Stereogum favorably compared the song to standout "Virgo's Groove", with the former publication highlighting their joint "depictions of Black joy... [and] steadfast tenderness that acknowledges its hard-won nature", and the latter stating that "in all of the excitement surrounding the samples and Easter eggs, Beyoncé reminds us that she is, first and foremost, a vocalist, her range shining the most on the comparably subdued 'Plastic Off The Sofa' and 'Virgo's Groove."

== Covers ==
Upon the song's release, many vocalists released covers of Beyoncé's complex vocal runs and melismas, including co-writer Sabrina Claudio, Chloe Bailey, Avery Wilson, Tori Kelly, and Josh Levi, among others.

Singer Belle from K-pop group Kiss of Life also covered the song on Korean Music webseries LeeMujin Service.

== Personnel ==
- Beyoncé – lead vocals, background vocals, producer, vocal producer
- Syd - producer
- Sabrina Claudio - background vocals
- Patrick Paige II - bass guitar
- Derek Renfroe - guitar
- Leven Kali - synthesizer, additional producer
- Stuart White – recording engineer, mixing engineer, vocal recording engineer
- John Cranfield - engineer
- Andrea Roberts - engineer
- Matheus Braz - assistant engineer
- Colin Leonard - mastering engineer
- Tony Maserati - mixing engineer

== Charts ==
Weekly chart performance for "Plastic Off the Sofa"
Chart (2022)	Peak position
Australia (ARIA)	89
Canada Hot 100 (Billboard)	70
France (SNEP)	198
UK Singles Chart (OCC)	56
US Billboard Hot 100	41
US Hot R&B/Hip-Hop Songs (Billboard)	16

== Certifications ==
Certifications and sales for "Plastic Off the Sofa"
Region	Certification	Certified units/sales
Brazil (Pro-Música Brasil)	Platinum	40,000^{‡}
United States (RIAA)	Gold	500,000^{‡}
^{‡} Sales+streaming figures based on certification alone.

== Awards and nominations ==
Year	Ceremony	Award	Result	Ref
2023	65th Annual Grammy Awards	Grammy Award for Best Traditional R&B Performance	Won	
