= Princess Loko =

American rapper (1979–2020)

Andrea Summers
- Born: August 2, 1979; Whitehaven, Memphis, Tennessee, US
- Died: May 21, 2020 (aged 40); Memphis, Tennessee, US
- Other name: Princess Loko
- Occupations: Rapper; songwriter; poet
- Children: 3
- Musical career
- Genres: Gangsta rap; memphis rap; horrorcore
- Years active: 1993–2020
- Labels: Street Smart Records; Hy Lyfe Inc.
- Formerly of: Ten Wanted Men

Andrea Summers (August 2, 1979 – May 21, 2020), also known as Princess Loko, was an American rapper best known for her fast, "double-time" syncopated rap flow, and early feminist candor. Notably rapping in Memphis, Tennessee group Ten Wanted Men alongside Tommy Wright III and La Chat during the early-to-late 1990s, she is widely considered to be a pioneer of rap music in South Memphis.

== Musical career ==
Summers began rapping in her teenage years as a method to communicate her thoughts on the over-policing, constant surveillance, and rampant crime in her hometown of Whitehaven, Memphis, a predominantly Black community in the 1990s (due to white flight) best known for its proximity to Elvis Presley's Graceland. She would also frequently discuss avoidance of the gaze of men who attempted to use intimate relationships to exert power over her and other women. Summers soon met rapper and producer Wright, who would become a close friend. They would frequently record songs together as teenagers in secret, skipping school and sneaking equipment in and out of her house. Wright would eventually sign her to his label Street Smart Records, and she would join his rap group Ten Wanted Men. The contributions of Summers and fellow female rapper La Chat to Wright's group were described as "razor-sharp stilettoes in an arsenal otherwise filled with heavy, male artillery." “I felt they were just as good as the guys,” Wright said. “That’s big to me – I never really thought about it being special. I just looked at it as ‘They’re dope.’” Summers would later part ways with Wright and the label in 2003, signing with Hy Lyfe Inc. after mounting financial difficulties resulted in the closure of the Street Smart label offices.

In 2014, designer Isabel Simpson-Kirsch created a clothing line in collaboration with online retailer VFILES paying homage to the faces of 1990s Memphis rap, with Summers' lyrics from Wright collaboration "Comin' For 94" featured prominently on handprinted skirts, pants, and various denim pieces.

=== Death ===
In 2020, Summers died from complications of congestive heart failure.

=== Resurgence ===
In 2022, producer Kelman Duran, who had received permission from Summers' family, estate, and close friend Wright to use her catalog of songs in his productions, sampled Wright's song with Summers (1994s "Still Pimpin") to create dembow and reggaeton-infused opening track "I'm That Girl" from Beyoncé's seventh album Renaissance.

== Discography ==
=== Ten Wanted Men ===
==== Albums ====
- Wanted Dead or Alive (1995)
- 10 Toes Down (1997)

=== Solo ===
==== Mixtapes ====
- Game Recognize Game (2001) ^{A}

==== Albums ====
- It’s All On Me (2006)
- Long Ovadue (2012)

==== Notes ====
A. ^{A} Though mentioned in passing by several publications, this project has not been widely released.
