= Cuff It =

2022 single by Beyoncé

Single by Beyoncé

from the album Renaissance
- Released: September 30, 2022
- Recorded: 2020
- Studio: Juicy Juicy; Nightbird Recording; Parkwood West (Los Angeles); Blakeslee (North Hollywood, Los Angeles); Le Crib (Westport, Connecticut); Tree Sound (Atlanta); Trailer (East Hampton, New York)
- Genre: Disco; disco funk
- Length: 3:45
- Label: Parkwood; Columbia
- Composers: Raphael Saadiq; Morten Ristorp; Nile Rodgers; Mary Brockert; Allen McGrier
- Lyricists: Beyoncé Knowles; Denisia Andrews; Brittany Coney; Terius Nash
- Producers: Beyoncé; Nova Wav

Beyoncé singles chronology
"Make Me Say It Again, Girl" (2022)	"Cuff It" (2022)	"America Has a Problem" (2023)

Lyric video
- "Cuff It" on YouTube

"Cuff It" is a song by American singer Beyoncé from her seventh studio album, Renaissance (2022). It was released as the album's second single on September 30, 2022, through Parkwood Entertainment and Columbia Records. The song was written and produced by Beyoncé, Nova Wav, Morten Ristorp, Raphael Saadiq, and The-Dream, with additional writing by Nile Rodgers. A disco and disco funk song, "Cuff It" contains an interpolation of "Ooo La La La" (1988), written by Teena Marie and Allen McGrier and performed by Teena Marie.

"Cuff It" received critical acclaim and was highlighted as an album standout by various critics. The song was deemed the best song of 2022 by NME and appeared in some other year-end lists. It charted in more than a dozen territories. In the United States, "Cuff It" peaked at number six on the Billboard Hot 100 chart, becoming Renaissance's second top-ten single. The single peaked at number 12 on the Billboard Global 200 chart; reached the top 10 in Australia, Belgian Wallonia, Ireland, New Zealand, South Africa, and the United Kingdom; and has been certified diamond in Brazil and France.

"Cuff It" won the Grammy Award for Best R&B Song at the 65th Annual Grammy Awards. On February 3, 2023, Beyoncé released a "Wetter Remix" of the song, after DJ Esentrik unofficially mashed up the instrumental of 2009's "Wetter" by Twista with "Cuff It". The mashup went viral online and was then officially released by Beyoncé with new vocals and lyrics.

== Background ==
When I got called to play on this song, it was the most organic thing that ever happened to me. I heard the song and I just said "I wanna play on that. Right now." And it was one take, I promise. I played it, it was one take and I never even got "Well Nile, maybe you should do this, maybe you should do that?" It was just what I felt in my heart.

— Nile Rodgers, accepting Best R&B Song at the 65th Annual Grammy Awards for "Cuff It"

Beyoncé told British Vogue that the lockdown due to the COVID-19 pandemic changed her as a person, stating that she has "spent a lot of time focusing on building my legacy and representing my culture the best way I know how. Now, I've decided to give myself permission to focus on my joy." She released her seventh studio album, Renaissance, in July 2022 to critical acclaim. "Cuff It" appears as the fourth track on the album, and was written and produced by Beyoncé, Nova Wav, Morten Ristorp, Raphael Saadiq and The-Dream, while additional writing was handled by Nile Rodgers. The song contains an interpolation of Teena Marie's "Ooo La La La" (1988), written by Teena Marie and Allen McGrier.

In a 2023 interview with Vulture, Raphael Saadiq revealed that the song was originally meant for his group Tony! Toni! Toné!, but he decided to send it to Beyoncé. Saadiq explained that she accepted the demo but kept it aside until The-Dream found it:

She's one of those people where if she's feeling it, she's going 100 percent in. I said, 'It's going to move people. It's going to work, I'm telling you.' I think she just put it away. From what I heard, The-Dream eventually found it. [...] I already knew it was one of them joints. I always said, if you drop the right music on an artist, it could go, but I'm glad she has so many eyeballs on her, you know what I mean? You can't really trick people, it's got to be good. Beyoncé's a hard worker. I told her, 'I've always knew we would work together at some point.' Like I said, it's all about timing.

— Raphael Saadiq, in an interview with Vulture about "Cuff It" composition.

== Critical reception ==
"Cuff It" received acclaim from music critics. Exclaim!'s Vernon Ayiku declared the track as "the album's biggest standout" and described it as a "groovy feel-good anthem". AllMusic's Andy Kellman opined that "Cuff It" was "a disco-funk burner with Nile Rodgers' inimitable rhythm guitar" and that it has "all the vigor of Lady T's uptempo classics". USA Today critic Melissa Ruggieri described the song as a "soulful bop" and praised the signature guitar-funk sound of co-writer Nile Rodgers. Mikael Wood of Los Angeles Times categorized the song as "ebullient disco fantasia" and praised Beyoncé's sensual vocal delivery. Billboard additionally ranked it as the best song from Renaissance. Rolling Stone's editorial staff ranked "Cuff It" at number 29 on their list of the 70 best songs by Beyoncé.

Select year-end rankings of "Cuff It"
Publication	List	Rank	Ref.
Billboard	The 100 Best Songs of 2022	15	
Consequence	The 100 Best Songs of 2022	4	
NME	Top 50 Best Songs of 2022	1	
Rolling Stone	The 100 Best Songs of 2022	2	
The Fader	The 100 best songs of 2022	6	

== Accolades ==
Award nominations for "Cuff It"
Year	Ceremony	Award	Result	Ref.
2023	Grammy Awards	Best R&B Song	Won	
2023	ASCAP Rhythm & Soul	Most Performed R&B/Hip-Hop & Rap Songs	Won	
2023	NAACP Image Awards	Outstanding Soul/R&B Song	Won	
2023	iHeartRadio Music Awards	TikTok Bop of the Year	Nominated	
2023	BMI R&B/Hip-Hop Awards	Most Performed Songs of the Year	Won	
2023	MTV Video Music Awards	Song of Summer	Nominated	
2024	ASCAP Pop	Most Performed Pop Songs	Won	

== Commercial performance ==
In the United States, "Cuff It" debuted at number 13 on the Billboard Hot 100 for the week ending August 13, 2022. It peaked at number six for the week ending February 18, 2023, becoming Beyoncé's 21st top-ten solo single and the second top-ten single from Renaissance, making it Beyoncé's first album to have multiple top-ten songs since I Am... Sasha Fierce (2008). By April 2023, "Cuff It" had spent 34 weeks on the Hot 100, becoming Beyoncé's longest-charting US single as a soloist.

In Canada, the song debuted on the Canadian Hot 100 at number 37. After being released as the second single from Renaissance, the song reached a peak of number 16 for the week ending December 3, 2022.

In the United Kingdom, "Cuff It" debuted at number 14 on the Official Singles Chart on August 5, 2022. The song reached a peak of number five on October 14, 2022. In Ireland, "Cuff It" debuted at number 17 on September 23. On October 14, the song reached a peak of number six.

In New Zealand, "Cuff It" debuted at number 39 on the Official New Zealand Music Chart. The song rose 31 positions the following week to reach number eight, and peaked at number three on the week dated October 14, becoming Beyoncé's 20th top ten single in the country. In Australia, "Cuff It" reached a peak of number eight on October 17, 2022, becoming Beyoncé's 15th top ten single in the country.

== Live performance ==
Beyoncé first performed "Cuff It" in Stockholm, Sweden during the opening night of the Renaissance World Tour on May 10, 2023. It served as the opening song of the third, party-themed act of the concert titled "Motherboard." An image of a chrome robot handcuffed to the flat screen and lying across the dome appeared for the duration of the song.

This performance began with Beyoncé and her dancers inside the dome on the stairs alongside the band and background singers. Beyoncé sang a new intro to the song with the band punctuating the end of each line. The dome opened as she began the song's first verse, revealing her and the dancers' outfit changes. After the verse, Beyoncé addressed the audience and encouraged them to clap with her as she made her way to the main stage to begin the second verse. The music took a brief pause as she sat atop her dancers, Les Twins, singing "Can I sit on top of you?" The performance ended with the dancers and Beyoncé making their way to the secondary stage as she rapped the lyrics to the "Wetter" remix over the instrumental to "Energy," bridging the two songs.

"Cuff It" returned for the Cowboy Carter Tour in 2025. Beyoncé mounted a giant, glowing horseshoe and flew over the crowd to the towers located across from the stage where she performed the song. She returned to the main stage at its conclusion.

== Track listing ==
Streaming/digital download

1. "Cuff It" (Wetter remix) – 4:09
2. "Cuff It" (a cappella version) – 3:45
3. "Cuff It" (instrumental version) – 3:45

== Personnel and credits ==
=== Sample ===
- Contains an interpolation of "Ooh La La La", written by Mary Brockert and Allen McGrier and performed by Teena Marie

=== Studios ===
- Recorded at The Juicy Juicy) Nightbread Recording Studios, Parkwood West (Los Angeles); Blakeslee Studio (North Hollywood, California); Le Crib (Westport, Connecticut); Tree Sound Studios (Atlanta, Georgia); and The Trailer (East Hampton, New York)
- Mixed at Avenue A Studio West, Parkwood West, and The Juicy Juicy (Los Angeles)

=== Personnel ===
Performers

- Vocals by Beyoncé
- Background vocals by Beam

Musicians

- Jamelle Adisa – trumpet
- Daniel Crawford – piano
- Honey Dijon – drum programming
- The-Dream – synths
- Sheila E. – percussion
- Lemar Guillary – trombone
- Scott Mayo – saxophone
- Chris Penny – drum programming
- Nile Rodgers – guitar
- Rissi – keys
- Raphael Saadiq – bass, drums, ARP String, clavinet
- Luke Solomon – drum programming

Technical credits

- Beyoncé – production, vocal production
- Matheus Braz – assistant engineering
- Chi Coney – engineering
- John Cranfield – engineering
- The-Dream – additional production
- Russell Graham – recording
- Brandon Harding – engineering
- Hotae Alexander Jang – recording
- NovaWav – production
- Rissi – co-production
- Andrea Roberts – engineering
- Steve Rusch – recording
- Raphael Saadiq – co-production
- Stuart White – mixing, recording

== Charts ==
=== Weekly charts ===
Weekly chart performance
Chart (2022–2023)	Peak position
Australia (ARIA)	8
Austria (Ö3 Austria Top 40)	48
Belgium (Ultratop 50 Flanders)	18
Belgium (Ultratop 50 Wallonia)	2
Brazil Airplay (Crowley Charts)	67
Canada Hot 100 (Billboard)	16
Canada CHR/Top 40 (Billboard)	6
Canada Hot AC (Billboard)	18
Croatia (HRT)	12
Czech Republic (Singles Digitál Top 100)	42
Denmark (Tracklisten)	25
Estonian Airplay (TopHit)	21
Finland Airplay (Radiosoittolista)	67
France (SNEP)	14
Germany (GfK)	29
Global 200 (Billboard)	12
Greece International (IFPI)	18
Hungary (Editors' Choice Top 40)	34
Hungary (Single Top 40)	11
Iceland (Tónlistinn)	17
Ireland (IRMA)	6
Italy (FIMI)	69
Japan Hot Overseas (Billboard Japan)	18
Latvia (LAIPA)	16
Lithuania (AGATA)	11
Luxembourg (Billboard)	11
Netherlands (Dutch Top 40)	23
Netherlands (Single Top 100)	20
New Zealand (Recorded Music NZ)	3
Panama (Monitor Latino)	14
Poland (Polish Streaming Top 100)	83
Portugal (AFP)	16
San Marino (SMRRTV Top 50)	11
Slovakia Airplay (ČNS IFPI)	96
Slovakia Singles Digital (ČNS IFPI)	24
South Africa Streaming (TOSAC)	5
Spain (PROMUSICAE)	92
Suriname (Nationale Top 40)	18
Sweden (Sverigetopplistan)	35
Switzerland (Schweizer Hitparade)	18
UK Singles (Official Charts)	5
US Billboard Hot 100	6
US Adult Contemporary (Billboard)	29
US Adult Pop Airplay (Billboard)	19
US Dance Airplay (Billboard)	15
US Hot R&B/Hip-Hop Songs (Billboard)	3
US Pop Airplay (Billboard)	8
US R&B/Hip-Hop Airplay (Billboard)	1
US Rhythmic Airplay (Billboard)	1

=== Year-end charts ===
2022 annual chart rankings
Chart (2022)	Position
Australia (ARIA)	78
Belgium (Ultratop 50 Flanders)	124
Belgium (Ultratop 50 Wallonia)	105
France (SNEP)	170
Global 200 (Billboard)	164
Hungary (Single Top 40)	89
Netherlands (Single Top 100)	92
Portugal (AFP)	146
UK Singles (OCC)	89
US Hot R&B/Hip-Hop Songs (Billboard)	40

2023 annual chart rankings
Chart (2023)	Position
Australia (ARIA)	74
Belgium (Ultratop 50 Flanders)	88
Belgium (Ultratop 50 Wallonia)	25
Brazil Streaming (Pro-Música Brasil)	180
Canada (Canadian Hot 100)	60
France (SNEP)	57
Global 200 (Billboard)	44
New Zealand (Recorded Music NZ)	46
Portugal (AFP)	109
UK Singles (OCC)	43
US Billboard Hot 100	29
US Hot R&B/Hip-Hop Songs (Billboard)	12
US Mainstream Top 40 (Billboard)	23
US Rhythmic (Billboard)	21

== Certifications ==
Certifications and sales for "Cuff It"
Region	Certification	Certified units/sales
Australia (ARIA)	2× Platinum	140,000^{‡}
Belgium (BRMA)	Platinum	40,000^{‡}
Brazil (Pro-Música Brasil)	3× Diamond	480,000^{‡}
Canada (Music Canada)	3× Platinum	240,000^{‡}
Denmark (IFPI Danmark)	Platinum	90,000^{‡}
France (SNEP)	Diamond	333,333^{‡}
Italy (FIMI)	Platinum	100,000^{‡}
Mexico (AMPROFON)	Platinum+Gold	210,000^{‡}
New Zealand (RMNZ)	3× Platinum	90,000^{‡}
Poland (ZPAV)	Platinum	50,000^{‡}
Portugal (AFP)	2× Platinum	20,000^{‡}
Spain (Promusicae)	Platinum	60,000^{‡}
Switzerland (IFPI Switzerland)	Platinum	20,000^{‡}
United Kingdom (BPI)	2× Platinum	1,200,000^{‡}
United States (RIAA)	3× Platinum	3,000,000^{‡}
Streaming
Greece (IFPI Greece)	Gold	1,000,000^{†}
^{‡} Sales+streaming figures based on certification alone.^{†} Streaming-only figures based on certification alone.

== Release history ==
"Cuff It" release history
Region	Date	Format(s)	Version	Label(s)	Ref.
Italy	September 30, 2022	Radio airplay	Original	Sony	
United States	October 4, 2022	Rhythmic contemporary radio; urban contemporary radio	Original	Columbia	
United States	October 18, 2022	Contemporary hit radio	Original	Columbia	
Various	February 3, 2023	Digital download	Wetter remix	Parkwood; Columbia	
Various	February 5, 2023	Digital download	Original	Parkwood; Columbia	
Various	February 5, 2023	Digital download	A capella	Parkwood; Columbia	
Various	February 5, 2023	Digital download	Instrumental	Parkwood; Columbia	
