= America Has a Problem =

Single by Beyoncé featuring Kendrick Lamar

from the album Renaissance
- Released: May 19, 2023
- Studio: The Trailer (East Hampton, New York)
- Genre: Miami bass; electro
- Length: 3:18; 4:20 (featuring Kendrick Lamar)
- Label: Parkwood; Columbia
- Songwriters: Beyoncé Knowles; Terius Nash; Mike Dean; Andrell D. Rogers; Tino Santron McIntosh; Shawn Carter; Kendrick Duckworth (remix)
- Producers: Beyoncé; The-Dream

Beyoncé singles chronology
"Cuff It" (2023)	"America Has a Problem" (2023)	"Virgo's Groove" (2023)

Kendrick Lamar singles chronology
"Die Hard" (2022)	"America Has a Problem" (2023)	"The Hillbillies" (2023)

Lyric videos
- "America Has a Problem" on YouTube; "America Has a Problem" (remix) on YouTube

"America Has a Problem" is a song by American singer Beyoncé, taken from her seventh studio album, Renaissance (2022), which was released on July 29, 2022, through Parkwood Entertainment and Columbia Records as an album track. It contains a sample of "Cocaine", written by Tino Santron Macintosh and Andrell D. Rogers and performed by Kilo Ali. A remix of the song featuring Kendrick Lamar was issued as the album's third single, and was released on May 19, 2023.

== Critical reception ==
"America Has a Problem" has received positive reviews from music critics. Will Dukes of Rolling Stone described the song as a "cool-as-the-inside-of-an-ice-cream-truck banger," and highlights its "stark" chords and "jittery" hi-hats. Writing for Billboard, Kyle Denis applauded the interpolation of "Cocaine" for providing a "canvas for some of the best rapping of Beyoncé’s career; it’s an ambitious song that reveals new rewards with every listen."

Melissa Ruggieri of USA Today named "America Has a Problem" as the most intriguingly titled song on Renaissance, and praised how Beyoncé "tears into a liquid rap sandwiched between a heavenly refrain." In a mixed review, Consequence's Marcus Shorter writes that the song has a "great groove," but the "tough talk of 'rolling with goons in case you start acting familiar' feels more out of place than a nun at Chippendales."

== Commercial performance ==
After the release of Renaissance, the album version of "America Has a Problem" debuted on the Billboard Hot 100 chart at number 69 and on the Hot R&B/Hip-Hop Songs chart at number 27.

Fueled by the Kendrick Lamar remix, the song re-entered the Hot 100 at number 38.

== Live performance ==
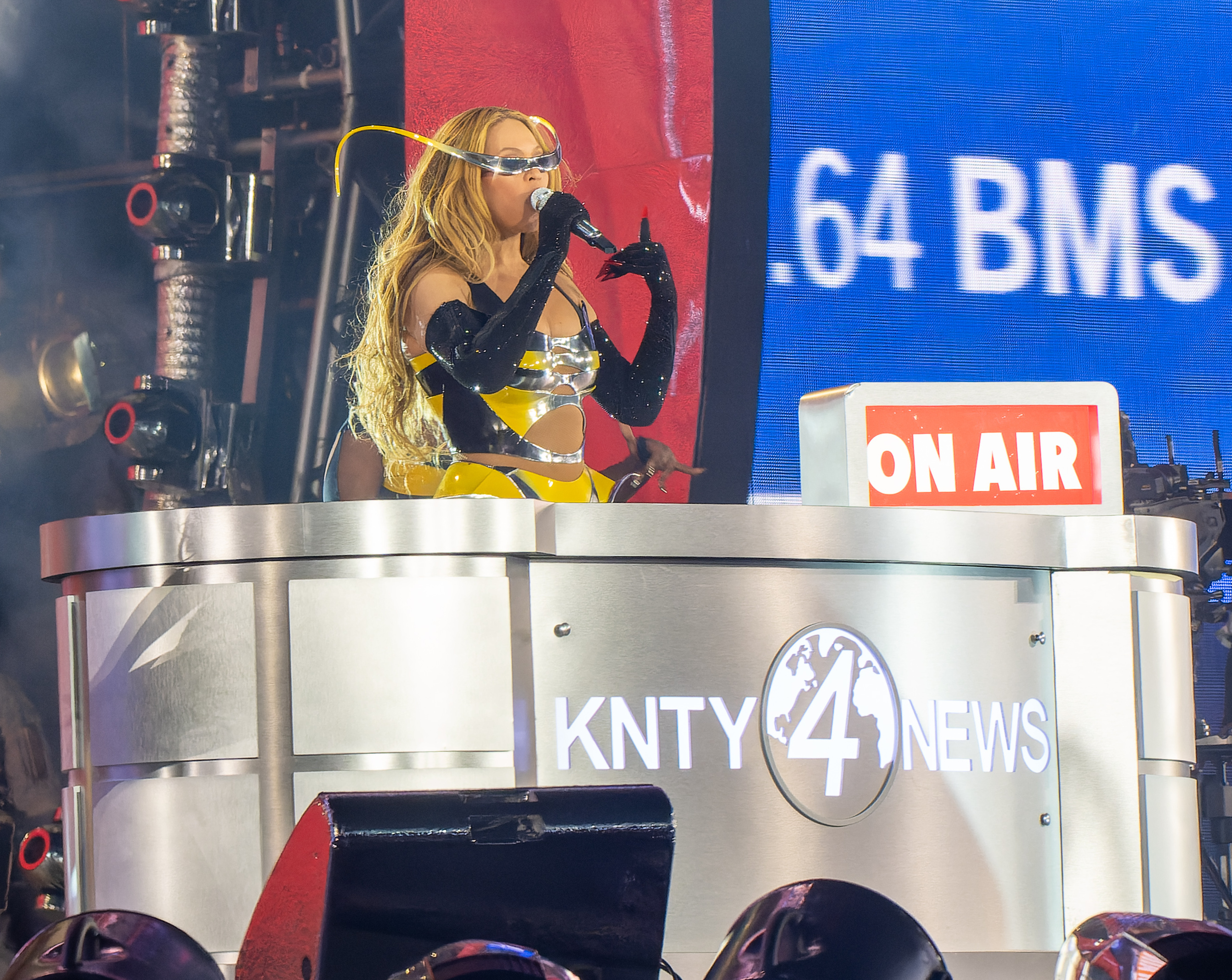
Beyoncé performing "America Has a Problem" on the Renaissance World Tour in 2023

Beyoncé first performed "America Has a Problem" on the Renaissance World Tour (2023), with the opening night taking place in Stockholm, Sweden.

The song is performed during the news broadcast-themed "Mind Control" act and starts with Beyoncé standing behind a news station desk with the words "KNTY 4 NEWS" displayed on front.

During the performance, Beyoncé wore different bee-inspired outfits, with the most prominent one being a custom Mugler bodysuit and an antenna headpiece from Thierry Mugler's vintage 1997 collection.

After the remix featuring Kendrick Lamar was released, elements of it were incorporated in the performance. Lamar later appeared as a surprise guest on the September 4 date of the Renaissance World Tour to perform his verse for the first time.

The song was also added to the setlist of the Cowboy Carter Tour, performed in a similar news broadcast set up, featuring a transparent podium with microphones, stock ticker visuals, and costumes decorated in newsprint graphics.

== Personnel ==
Performers

- Vocals by Beyoncé and Kendrick Lamar

Musicians

- Beyoncé – sound FX
- The-Dream – drum programming, sound FX
- Mike Dean – synths, Sound FX

Technical credits

- Beyoncé – production, vocal production
- Matheus Braz – assistant engineering
- Mike Dean – co-production
- The-Dream – production
- Brandon Harding – engineering
- Stuart White – mixing, recording

== Charts ==
Weekly chart performance for "America Has a Problem" (album version)
Chart (2022–2023)	Peak position
Canada Hot 100 (Billboard)	100
Global 200 (Billboard)	81
Ireland (IRMA)	15
Portugal (AFP)	103
South Africa Streaming (TOSAC)	53
Sweden Heatseeker (Sverigetopplistan)	1
Switzerland (Schweizer Hitparade)	96
UK Singles (Official Charts)	22
US Billboard Hot 100	69
US Hot R&B/Hip-Hop Songs (Billboard)	27

Weekly chart performance for "America Has a Problem" (single version; with Kendrick Lamar)
Chart (2023)	Peak position
Australia (ARIA)	32
Australia Hip Hop/R&B (ARIA)	8
Canada Hot 100 (Billboard)	41
Global 200 (Billboard)	40
Greece International (IFPI)	74
Lithuania (AGATA)	41
Netherlands (Single Top 100)	99
New Zealand (Recorded Music NZ)	25
US Billboard Hot 100	38
US Hot R&B/Hip-Hop Songs (Billboard)	11

== Certifications ==
Certifications and sales for "America Has a Problem"
Region	Certification	Certified units/sales
Australia (ARIA)	Gold	35,000^{‡}
Brazil (Pro-Música Brasil)	3× Platinum	120,000^{‡}
Canada (Music Canada)	Platinum	80,000^{‡}
New Zealand (RMNZ)	Gold	15,000^{‡}
United Kingdom (BPI)	Silver	200,000^{‡}
United States (RIAA)	Platinum	1,000,000^{‡}
^{‡} Sales+streaming figures based on certification alone.

== Release history ==
"America Has a Problem" release history
Region	Date	Format(s)	Version	Label(s)	Ref.
Various	May 19, 2023	Digital download; streaming	Remix	Parkwood; Columbia	
Italy	May 26, 2023	Radio airplay	Remix	Sony	
