= Virgo's Groove =

2023 single by Beyoncé

- Taken from Renaissance album booklet

Single by Beyoncé

from the album Renaissance
- Released: June 2, 2023
- Studio: Juicy Juicy; Kings Landing West; Nightbird Recording; Parkwood West (Los Angeles)
- Genre: Disco; funk
- Length: 6:08; 2:59 (radio edit)
- Label: Parkwood; Columbia
- Songwriters: Beyoncé Knowles; Leven Kali; Solomon Cole; Daniel Memmi; Dustin Bowie; Darius Dixson; Jocelyn Donald; Jesse Wilson; Denisia Andrews; Brittany Coney
- Producers: Beyoncé Knowles; Leven Kali

Beyoncé singles chronology
"America Has a Problem" (2023)	"Virgo's Groove" (2023)	"Delresto (Echoes)" (2023)

Lyric video
- "Virgo's Groove" on YouTube

"Virgo's Groove" is a song by American singer Beyoncé from her seventh studio album, Renaissance, which was released on July 29, 2022, through Parkwood Entertainment and Columbia Records as an album track. The song was sent to Italian radio as the album's fourth and final single on June 2, 2023. "Virgo's Groove" was nominated for Best R&B Performance at the 65th Annual Grammy Awards.

== Background and composition ==
When we all work together, we kind of come in with this fantasy of house, funk, R&B and jazz being fused together. The background vocals and the bassline is something that for me is like a signature. With "Virgo's Groove", you can hear us in the harmonies and in the bassline. The process over there is very specific. B does a really crazy job of just making sure everyone is focused on the right things.

— Leven Kali on "Virgo's Groove"

"Virgo's Groove", aptly named after Beyoncé’s astrological sign, is a disco-funk song with a running time of six minutes and eight seconds, making it the longest song on the album. In an early 2023 interview with Billboard, songwriter Jocelyn Donald revealed the song began as a "Houston R&B"-influenced demo she had co-written with Baltimore rapper Tate Kobang almost four years prior, titled "Right Here, Right Now", before being modified from "a great song into a masterpiece.” In an interview with Variety, songwriter Leven Kali recalled that the process for "Virgo's Groove" took "two-to three years" with an “incredibly collaborative process" to relate the song to the whole project. Kali also explains that the sound and the attitude of the song were helped by Beyoncé's, who was "thinking about a certain type of energy, a certain sound and we were also thinking in that direction so it was super organic" and flowed into themes and sounds "North Star, funk, positivity, love, dance, and groovy music".

== Critical reception ==
"Virgo's Groove" was critically acclaimed by music critics, with many of them calling it the best song on the album, especially appreciating Beyoncé's modulation of her voice.

Upon the release of the song's parent album, Eric Torres of Pitchfork gave the song its own review and applauded it, giving it the title of "Best New Track". In the review, he called the song the "apex" of the album, praising the song's production while also giving praise to Beyoncé for letting loose on the track and showcasing her voice. Billboard ranked "Virgo's Groove" as the third best song on the album, writing that in it "you get all the nuances of Beyoncé's voice in one colossus" and that the singer's ability to manipulate her voice "truly impresses."

Wesley Morris of The New York Times claimed it was the "most luscious" sounding song that Beyoncé has ever recorded. Craig Jenkins of Vulture said that the song was a "muscular update" on post-disco.

Select year-end rankings of Virgo's Groove
Publication	List	Rank	Ref.
The Guardian	The 20 Best Songs of 2022	7	
i-D	The 100 Best Songs of 2022	3	
Spin	The 50 Best Songs of the Year	5	
The Line of Best Fit	The 50 Best Songs of the Year	31	

== Commercial performance ==
After the release of Renaissance, "Virgo's Groove" debuted and peaked on the Billboard Hot 100 chart at number 43. It also debuted and peaked on the Hot R&B Songs and Hot R&B/Hip-Hop Songs charts at number 11 and 17 respectively. In Canada, the song debuted at number 65 on the Canadian Hot 100 chart.

== Live performance ==
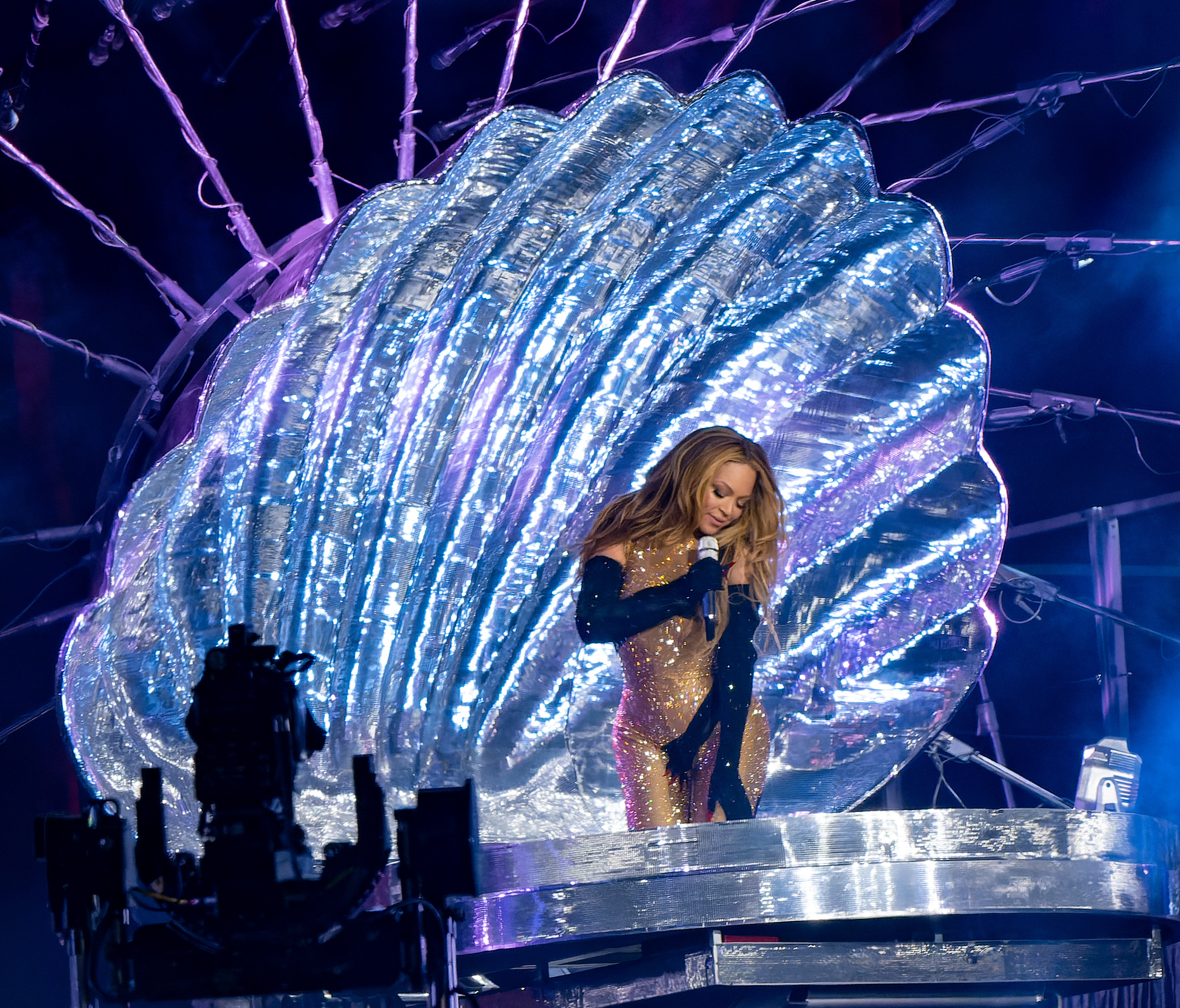
Beyoncé performing "Virgo's Groove" on the Renaissance World Tour in 2023

Beyoncé first performed "Virgo's Groove" on the Renaissance World Tour (2023), with the opening night taking place in Stockholm, Sweden. The performance followed a choir-led interlude leading up to Beyoncé being revealed inside a clam shell and wearing a shimmery, gold Loewe bodysuit, both referencing The Birth of Venus by Sandro Botticelli. On certain dates of the tour, she wore a silver variation of the outfit, as well as a red variation of it. Mid-way through the performance, Beyoncé switches to "Naughty Girl" and is walked down the shell to perform choreography before returning to "Virgo's Groove" for the outro. As the song closes, she sings snippets of several R&B songs from across her entire discography: "Say My Name," "Be With You," "Signs," "Speechless," "Cater 2 U," "Dance for You," and "Rocket."

== Personnel ==
Credits adapted from Beyoncé's website.

Performers

- Vocals by Beyoncé
- Background vocals by Leven Kali, Ashlee Wingate, Kye Young, Laylani Gesteedle-Diamant, and Anika Gesteedle-Diamant

Musicians

- Beyoncé – sound FX
- The-Dream – synthesizers, drum programming, sound FX

Technical credits

- Beyoncé – production, vocal production
- Leven Kali - production
- The-Dream - additional production
- Matheus Braz – assistant engineering
- Andrea Roberts – engineering
- John Cranfield – engineering
- Stuart White – mixing, recording

== Charts ==
Weekly chart performance for "Virgo's Groove"
Chart (2022)	Peak position
Canada Hot 100 (Billboard)	65
France (SNEP)	176
Global 200 (Billboard)	46
South Africa Streaming (TOSAC)	25
UK Audio Streaming (Official Charts)	61
US Billboard Hot 100	43
US Hot R&B/Hip-Hop Songs (Billboard)	17

== Certifications ==
Certifications for "Virgo's Groove"
Region	Certification	Certified units/sales
Brazil (Pro-Música Brasil)	2× Platinum	80,000^{‡}
United States (RIAA)	Gold	500,000^{‡}
^{‡} Sales+streaming figures based on certification alone.

== Release history ==
"Virgo's Groove" release history
Region	Date	Format	Label	Ref.
Italy	June 2, 2023	Radio airplay	Sony	
