= My House (Beyoncé song) =

Single by Beyoncé
- Released: December 1, 2023
- Recorded: 2022–2023
- Genre: Hip house; trap
- Length: 4:22 (main version); 3:25 (radio edit)
- Label: Parkwood; Columbia
- Songwriters: Beyoncé Knowles-Carter; Terius Gesteelde-Diamant
- Producers: Beyoncé; The-Dream

Beyoncé singles chronology
"Delresto (Echoes)" (2023)	"My House" (2023)	"Texas Hold 'Em" and "16 Carriages" (2024)

Lyric video
- "My House" on YouTube

"My House" is a song by American singer Beyoncé. It was released on December 1, 2023, through Parkwood Entertainment and Columbia Records, as a single to promote her 2023 concert film, Renaissance: A Film by Beyoncé. Written and produced by Beyoncé and American songwriter The-Dream, "My House" is a rap and house song driven by trap beats and horns.

== Background and composition ==
The song marks her first original solo release since Renaissance on July 29, 2022. The album was accompanied by the 2023 Renaissance World Tour, which was later brought to screen as Renaissance: A Film by Beyoncé on December 1, 2023. Soon after its release, speculation arose that there might be a new song playing throughout the credits for the movie, which would turn out to be "My House". The track was surprise-released the day after. In an interview with The Hollywood Reporter, producer and long-time collaborator The-Dream suggested the song was conceived as a way to mark the tailend of the Renaissance rollout: "How do we wrap [it] up in a way without also trying to compete with it or make something that's light-Renaissance, because Renaissance is a special thing?"

The "infectious" and "energetic" rap track was co-written and co-produced by The-Dream. Driven by "triumphant horns", "My House" sees the singer go into "full rap mode" and "scorching bars" as she "turns up the heat". The song features "bold, brassy tones" highlighted by a prominent "cracking trap beat".

== Reception ==
Alexis Petridis of The Guardian gave the song four out of five stars, describing it "genuinely unexpected and thrilling". Petridis wrote that its sound moves away from the sounds of Renaissance to "Houston hip-hop and abstract electronica", even if it "proves to be episodic in structure" without a chorus. At the end the critic stressed that "Beyoncé currently occupies a realm in which she does whatever she wants, something the powerful, uncommercial 'My House' serves to underline", something that "from anyone else, Taylor Swift for example, it would count as an unexpectedly leftfield preconception-baiting gesture".

Mary Siroky of Consequence wrote that Beyoncé "peels back some of the dance and house elements" to sounds incorporated in Homecoming: The Live Album, with a "truly wild beat" similar to "Single Ladies (Put a Ring on It)" and "tonal swings" of the voice. Hattie Lindert of Pitchfork also compared the song to "a star athlete’s celebration pose after a godlike game [...] begin[ning] as a nasty step team stomp that evokes the unified roar of 2018's Homecoming before switch[ing] to a boiling house cut where she calls for a self-love revolution." Ludovic Hunter-Tilney of the Financial Times described the song as "an enjoyably bombastic stomper" in which listeners "surrender to Beyoncé's powerful singing."

The song was nominated at the 24th Black Reel Awards for Outstanding Original Song.

Critics' rankings of "My House"
Publication	List	Rank	Ref.
Time	The 10 Best Songs of 2023	3	

== Commercial performance ==
In the United States, "My House" debuted at number 57 on the Billboard Hot 100. It also became Beyoncé's fifth Top 10 song on the Hot Dance/Electronic Songs and sixth Top 10 song on the Hot Rap Songs chart, her first rap charting as lead artist.

== Live performances ==
On December 25, 2024, Beyoncé debuted "My House" live as part of her 2024 NFL Halftime Show set list. Beyoncé performed "My House" on her Cowboy Carter Tour.

== Personnel ==
- Beyoncé – producer, composer, lyricist, lead vocals, background vocals, vocal producer, performer
- The-Dream – producer, composer, lyricist, vocals, background vocals
- Khirye Tyler – additional producer
- Mike Dean – mixing engineer, mastering engineer
- Stuart White – recording engineer
- Brandon Harding – recording engineer
- Sean Solymar – assistant engineer
- Tommy Rush – assistant engineer
- Matheus Braz – assistant engineer

== Charts ==
=== Weekly charts ===
Weekly chart performance for "My House"
Chart (2023–2024)	Peak position
Australia New Music Singles (ARIA)	17
Canada Hot 100 (Billboard)	64
Global 200 (Billboard)	63
Greece International (IFPI)	60
Ireland (IRMA)	53
Japan Hot Overseas (Billboard Japan)	14
Netherlands (Single Tip)	4
Netherlands (Tipparade)	25
New Zealand Hot Singles (RMNZ)	3
UK Singles (Official Charts)	56
US Billboard Hot 100	57
US Hot Dance/Electronic Songs (Billboard)	2
US Hot R&B/Hip-Hop Songs (Billboard)	11
US R&B/Hip-Hop Airplay (Billboard)	29
US Rhythmic Airplay (Billboard)	14

=== Year-end charts ===
2024 year-end chart performance for "My House"
Chart (2024)	Position
US Hot Dance/Electronic Songs (Billboard)	20

== Certifications ==
Region	Certification	Certified units/sales
Brazil (Pro-Música Brasil)	Gold	20,000^{‡}
^{‡} Sales+streaming figures based on certification alone.

== Release history ==
Release dates and formats for "My House"
Region	Date	Format(s)	Label(s)	Ref.
Various	December 1, 2023	Digital download; streaming	Parkwood; Columbia	
Italy	December 8, 2023	Radio airplay	Sony	
