= Organized Bass =

Studio album by Kilo Ali
- Released: July 29, 1997
- Studios: Synergy (Atlanta, Georgia); Purple Dragon (Atlanta, Georgia)
- Genre: Bass music
- Length: 54:55
- Label: Interscope
- Producers: Cooly C; DJ Taz; Kilo Ali; Kool-Ace; Mr. Richards; Red Money

Kilo Ali chronology
| Get This Party Started (1995) | Organized Bass (1997) | Sa-La-Meen (2010) |

Singles from Organized Bass
- 1. "Show Me Love" Released: April 29, 1997; 2. "Baby, Baby" Released: July 29, 1997

Professional ratings
Review scores
| Source | Rating |
|---|---|
| AllMusic | 3/5 stars |

Organized Bass is the sixth studio album by American rapper and record producer Kilo Ali. It was released on July 29, 1997, via Interscope Records. The recording sessions took place at Synergy Studios and Purple Dragon Studios in Atlanta. The album was produced by Red Money, Cooly C, DJ Taz, Kool-Ace, Mr. Richards, and Kilo Ali, with King J and Organized Noize serving as executive producers. It features guest appearances from Big Boi, CeeLo Green, George Clinton, JT Money, and Kool-Ace.

The album debuted at number 173 on the Billboard 200, number 44 on the Top R&B Albums and number 9 on the Heatseekers Albums charts in the United States. It was supported with two singles: "Show Me Love" and "Baby, Baby", which peaked on the US Hot R&B Songs chart at numbers 86 and 77, respectively.

In June 2021, Kilo Ali filed the lawsuit for copyright infringement against NLE Choppa, Latto, Norva Denton and NLE Choppa Entertainment/Warner Music Group, claiming that NLE Choppa's song "Make Em Say" uses elements of Kilo's "Love In Ya Mouth" from the album.

== Track listing ==
Organized Bass track listing
| No. | Title | Writer(s) | Producer(s) | Length |
|---|---|---|---|---|
| 1. | "Show Me Love" | Andrell D. Rogers; Carl Dorsey; Arthur Baker | Cooly C | 3:06 |
| 2. | "Baby, Baby" | Rogers; Brian Fleming | Kilo Ali; Kool-Ace | 3:26 |
| 3. | "Lost Y'All Mind" | Rogers; Tino McIntosh | DJ Taz | 4:42 |
| 4. | "It's Tricky" | Rogers; Rodney Richards; Maurice Cenac | Mr. Richards | 4:27 |
| 5. | "Save Me" | Rogers; Dorsey | Cooly C | 4:26 |
| 6. | "Bottom to the Top" (featuring JT Money) | Rogers; Jeffrey Thompkins; McIntosh; Juan Atkins; Richard Davis | DJ Taz | 4:57 |
| 7. | "Love in Ya Mouth" (featuring Big Boi) | Rogers; Antwan Patton; Dorsey | Cooly C | 5:28 |
| 8. | "Girl's All Dance" | Rogers; Reginald Lowe | Red Money | 4:12 |
| 9. | "Organized Bass" (featuring CeeLo Green) | Rogers; Thomas Callaway; Lowe; Norman Whitfield | Red Money | 6:15 |
| 10. | "Ali" | Rogers; Lowe; John Deacon; David Robert Jones; Brian May; Farrokh Bulsara; Roger Taylor | Red Money | 4:12 |
| 11. | "Loot Chi Chi" (featuring Kool-Ace and George Clinton) | Rogers; Fleming; George Clinton | Kool-Ace | 4:31 |
| 12. | "Hit Me" | Rogers; Lowe | Red Money | 5:31 |
| Total length: | | | | 54:55 |

Sample credits

- Track 1 contains a sample from "Play at Your Own Risk" written by Arthur Baker and John Robie as performed by Planet Patrol.
- Tracks 5 and 8 contain samples from "Planet Rock" written by Robert Allen, Arthur Baker, John Robie, John Miller and Ellis Williams as performed by Afrika Bambaataa and the Soulsonic Force.
- Track 9 contains an interpolation of "Masterpiece" written by Norman Whitfield.

== Personnel ==
- Andrell "Kilo Ali" Rogers – vocals, producer & mixing (track 2)
- Jeffrey "JT Money" Thompkins – vocals (track 6)
- Antwan "Big Boi" Patton – vocals (track 7)
- Thomas "CeeLo Green" Callaway – vocals (track 9)
- Brian "Kool-Ace" Fleming – vocals (track 11), producer & mixing (tracks: 2, 11)
- George Clinton – vocals (track 11)
- Buretha Rahim – backing vocals (tracks: 1, 5, 8)
- Bureasa Rahim – backing vocals (tracks: 1, 8)
- Rodney Flournoy – backing vocals (track 1)
- Betty Jones – backing vocals (track 2)
- Bettie Boo – backing vocals (tracks: 4, 5)
- Angela Pope – backing vocals (track 5)
- Bureasia Hurt – backing vocals (track 5)
- Bursun Armour – backing vocals (track 5)
- Sean Murray – backing vocals (track 5)
- True Tone – backing vocals (track 5)
- Wendell Brown – backing vocals (track 5)
- Charles Pettaway – bass guitar (track 2), guitar (track 11)
- Tino Santron "DJ Taz" Mcintosh – keyboards (track 3), producer & mixing (tracks: 3, 6)
- Edgar Hinton – guitar (track 4)
- Rodney "Mr. Richards" Richard – keyboard programming, drum programming, producer, mixing (track 4)
- Martin Terry – acoustic guitar (track 7)
- Billy Odum – acoustic guitar (track 7)
- Carl "Cooly C" Dorsey – keyboards (track 7), producer, programming & mixing (tracks: 1, 5, 7)
- David "Mr. DJ" Sheats – scratches (track 7)
- Reginald "Red Money" Lowe – scratches (track 9), producer, programming & mixing (tracks: 8–10, 12)
- Dexter Simmons – mixing
- Organized Noize – mixing, executive producers
- Oscar Jimenez – engineering (tracks: 1–8, 10–12)
- Shawn Grove – engineering (tracks: 1, 4, 7–12)
- Vincent Marshel – engineering (track 7)
- Tom Coyne – mastering
- Jarvis "King J" Rahim – executive producer
- Sheila Harrell – design
- Kim Garcia – photography
- J.B. Hargrove – creative director
- Ramon Campbell – A&R
- Dee Dee Hibbler – A&R

== Charts ==
Chart performance for Organized Bass
| Chart (1997) | Peak position |
|---|---|
| US Billboard 200 | 173 |
| US Top R&B/Hip-Hop Albums (Billboard) | 44 |
| US Heatseekers Albums (Billboard) | 9 |
