= Rodeo (2022 French film) =

2022 film by Lola Quivoron

- French theatrical release poster
- French: Rodéo
- Directed by: Lola Quivoron
- Written by: Lola Quivoron; Antonia Buresi
- Produced by: Charles Gillibert
- Starring: Julie Ledru; Yanis Lafki; Antonia Buresi; Louis Sotton; Rukkmini Ghosh; Junior Correia; Ahmed Hamdi; Dave Nsaman; Mustapha Dianka; Mohamed Bettahar; Chris Makodi; Cody Schroeder; Sébastien Schroeder
- Cinematography: Raphaël Vandenbussche
- Edited by: Rafael Torres Calderón
- Music by: Kelman Duran
- Production companies: CG Cinéma; Canal+; Ciné+
- Distributed by: Les Films du Losange
- Release dates: 19 May 2022 (Cannes); 7 September 2022 (France)
- Running time: 104 minutes
- Country: France
- Language: French
- Box office: $174,587

Rodeo (French: Rodéo) is a 2022 French drama film written and directed by Lola Quivoron, in her directorial debut. It stars Julie Ledru as Julia, a young motorcycle thief in the outskirts of Bordeaux.

The film had its world premiere in the Un Certain Regard section of the 2022 Cannes Film Festival on 19 May 2022, where it won the section's Coup de Coeur prize and was nominated for the Caméra d'Or and the Queer Palm. It was theatrically released in France on 7 September 2022 by Les Films du Losange.

== Plot ==
Julia, a young woman living in social housing who has a poor relationship with her mother; passionate about the sport of motocross, she tries to gain the opportunity to participate in the sport by posing as a buyer on shopping websites so that she can take bikes out for test rides. As she becomes drawn deeper into the urban motocross scene, however, she begins to participate in a motorcycle theft ring.

== Cast ==
- Julie Ledru as Julia
- Yanis Lafki as Kaïs
- Antonia Buresi as Ophélie
- Louis Sotton as Ben
- Rukkmini Ghosh as
- Junior Correia as Manel
- Ahmed Hamdi as Mous
- Dave Nsaman as Abra
- Mustapha Dianka as Clark
- Mohamed Bettahar as Amine
- Chris Makodi as William
- Cody Schroeder as Kylian
- Sébastien Schroeder as Domino

== Release ==
The film won the Golden Puffin Award at the 2022 Reykjavík International Film Festival. At the Seville European Film Festival, the film won the Cinephiles of the Future award and Ledru was cowinner with Zar Amir Ebrahimi of the award for Best Actress. The film won the Audience Award for the Altered States program at the 2022 Vancouver International Film Festival.

Rodeo was released theatrically in France on 7 September 2022 by Les Films du Losange. It was released in select theatres in the United States on 17 March 2023 by Music Box Films.

== Remake ==
In May 2024, StudioCanal and The Picture Company purchased rights to remake the film in America.
