= Kilo Ali =

American rapper

- Also known as: Kilo
- Born: Andrell D. Rogers; May 1, 1973 (age 53); Atlanta, Georgia, U.S.
- Origin: Bankhead, Atlanta, Georgia, U.S.
- Genres: Hip hop; Miami bass
- Occupations: Rapper, songwriter
- Labels: Arvis (1990–1992); Wrap/Ichiban (1992–1996); Interscope (1997–1998)

Andrell D. Rogers (born May 1, 1973), better known as Kilo Ali, formerly Kilo, is an American rapper from Atlanta, Georgia. Kilo Ali recorded mainly bass music (described more closely to Miami bass style music), but also hip-hop tracks with a less distinctive Southern flavor. His most well known singles include "Show Me Love", "Baby Baby", and "Love In Ya Mouth".

As Kilo Ali, he released Organized Bass in 1997 on Interscope, with featured artists including George Clinton, Cee-Lo of Goodie Mob, Big Boi of OutKast, and JT Money. In 2011, Ali was released from prison after serving six years of a 15-year sentence for arson. In June 2021, Ali sued rapper NLE Choppa for copyright infringement for unauthorized use of his 1997 song, "Love In Ya Mouth".

Ali’s track "America Has a Problem (Cocaine)" was sampled on Beyoncé’s 2023 single "America Has a Problem" from her Grammy Award winning 2022 album, Renaissance.

== Discography ==
=== Albums ===
- 1990/1991: America Has a Problem
- 1992: A-Town Rush (No. 67 U.S. Rap)
- 1993: Bluntly Speaking
- 1993: Git wit da Program
- 1994: The Best and the Bass
- 1995: Get This Party Started (No. 57 U.S. Rap)

As Kilo Ali

- 1997: Organized Bass (No. 173 U.S., No. 44 U.S. Rap)
- 2010: Sa-La-Meen
- 2011: Hieroglyphics

=== Singles ===
Year	Song	U.S. R&B	U.S. Rap	Album
1990	"America Has a Problem (Cocaine)"	—	—	America Has a Problem
1991	"Hear What I Hear"	—	—	A-Town Rush
1995	"Donkey Kong"	—	34	Get This Party Started
1996	"Nasty Dancer/White Horse"	67	17	Get This Party Started
1997	"Show Me Love"	86	32	Organized Bass
1997	"Baby Baby"	82	—	Organized Bass
