= Leven Kali =

Dutch singer, songwriter, producer, multi-instrumentalist

- Born: Leven Kali Simon-Seay; October 7, 1994 (age 31); Netherlands
- Genres: Neo soul
- Occupations: Singer; songwriter; producer; multi-instrumentalist
- Label: Def Jam
- Website: levenkali.com

Leven Kali Simon-Seay, known as Leven Kali, is a Dutch-born American singer, songwriter, producer, and multi-instrumentalist best known for his work on Beyoncé's Renaissance, Drake's More Life and Playboi Carti's self titled mixtape Playboi Carti.

== Career ==
=== Early life ===
Born into a family of musicians, Simon-Seay was born in Amsterdam, Netherlands while his father, bass guitarist Jerry "Wyzard" Seay, was on a European tour with his band Mother's Finest. His family subsequently relocated to Santa Monica, California, at the age of eight, where he would eventually join the music program at Crossroads High School, building a close-knit network of musicians and visual artists. Upon graduation, Simon-Seay attended University of California, Riverside on an NCAA Division I golf scholarship before moving into music creation.

=== Music career ===
Simon-Seay, alongside Daniel Memmi and Solomon "Sol Was" Cole, friends he made through his Crossroads High School music program, joined forces as a production/songwriting team, subsequently co-creating Renaissance standout "Virgo's Groove".

== Discography ==
Studio albums

- Low Tide (2019) (Interscope Records)
- HIGHTIDE (2020) (Interscope Records)
- Let It Rain EP (2022)
- LK99 (2026)

== Songwriting and production credits ==
Credits are courtesy of Discogs, Tidal, Apple Music, and AllMusic.

Title	Year	Artist	Album
"Another World"	2016	NCT 127	NCT 127
"They Never Know"	2016	Exo	Ex'Act
"The 7th Sense"	2016	NCT U	NCT 2018 Empathy
"Twenty Four"	2016	Exo	For Life (EP)
"Starlight" (featuring Dean)	2016	Taeyeon	Why
"Drip Drop	2016	Taemin	Press It
"All I Have (Intro)"	2017	Snoh Aalegra	Feels
"Time"	2017	Snoh Aalegra	Feels
"Do Not Disturb"	2017	Drake	More Life
"Rookie"	2017	Red Velvet	Rookie
"Let My Baby Stay (Cover)"	2017	Amandla Stenberg	Everything, Everything Film Soundtrack
"Heart Stop" (featuring Seulgi)	2017	Taemin	Move
"Tempo"	2018	Exo	Don't Mess Up My Tempo
"Countless"	2018	Shinee	The Story of Light
"Golden"	2018	SG Lewis	Dusk EP
"HMU For A Good Time"	2021	Tinashe	333 (Deluxe)
"Tragic"	2021	Jazmine Sullivan	Heaux Tales, Mo Tales: The Deluxe
"Alien Superstar"	2022	Beyoncé	Renaissance
"Plastic Off the Sofa"	2022	Beyoncé	Renaissance
"Virgo's Groove"	2022	Beyoncé	Renaissance
"Summer Renaissance"	2022	Beyoncé	Renaissance
"Shiesty"	2022	Kyle	It's Not So Bad
"Hazel Theme"	2023	Skrillex	Quest for Fire
"Still Here (With the Ones That I Came With)" (With Porter Robinson and Bibi Bourelly)	2023	Skrillex	Quest for Fire
"Bodyguard"	2024	Beyoncé	Cowboy Carter
"Crazy"	2024	Le Sserafim	Crazy
"Images"	2024	WayV	The Highest
"She Got It" (Featuring Coco Jones and GloRilla)	2025	Teddy Swims	I've Tried Everything but Therapy (Part 2)
"AOEMG"	2025	Coco Jones	Why Not More?
"Bluffin'" (with The Kid LAROI)	2026	Joji	Piss in the Wind

== Guest appearances ==
List of guest appearances, with other performing artists, showing year released and album name
Title	Year	Other performer(s)	Album
"Flex"	2017	Playboi Carti	Playboi Carti
"Text Me"	2018	Diggy Simmons	Lighten Up
"Wait On You"	2021	Jay Worthy, Na-Kel Smith	Two4Two
"Naked"	2023	Adi Oasis	Lotus Glow
"How You Feel"	2024	ANOTR, Erik Bandit	On a Trip
"One2Three"	2025	Disclosure, Chris Lake	Non-album single

== Awards and nominations ==
Year	Ceremony	Award	Result	Ref
2023	65th Annual Grammy Awards	Album of the Year (Renaissance)	Nominated	
2023	65th Annual Grammy Awards	Grammy Award for Best Dance/Electronic Album (Renaissance) ^{A}	Won	
2025	Canadian Country Music Association	Song of The Year (Bodyguard)	Nominated	

=== Notes ===
A. ^{A} Winning producers in this category with less than a 50% album contribution are awarded with a Winner's Certificate.
