= Renaissance (Beyoncé album) =

2022 studio album by Beyoncé

- Standard cover

Studio album by Beyoncé
- Released: July 29, 2022
- Recorded: 2014; 2020–2022
- Studios: Sing Mastering; Tree Sound (Atlanta); Avenue A West; Hardcover; Henson Recording; Juicy Juicy; Kings Landing West; Nightbird Recording; Parkwood West; Record Plant (Los Angeles); Trailer (East Hampton, New York); Blakeslee (North Hollywood, California); Zak Starkey (Ochi Rios, Jamaica); Le Crib (Westport, Connecticut)
- Genres: Dance; house; pop; R&B
- Length: 62:14
- Labels: Parkwood; Columbia
- Producers: Al Cres; A. G. Cook; BAH; Beam; Beyoncé; Boi-1da; Honey Dijon; Kelman Duran; Hit-Boy; Jameil Aossey; Leven Kali; Mike Dean; Neenyo; No I.D.; Nova Wav; P2J; Chris Penny; Luke Solomon; Syd; Skrillex; Tricky Stewart; Jahaan Sweet; Symbolyc One; Sevn Thomas; The-Dream

Beyoncé chronology
The Lion King: The Gift (2019)	Renaissance (2022)	Cowboy Carter (2024)

Singles from Renaissance
- 1. "Break My Soul" Released: June 20, 2022; 2. "Cuff It" Released: September 30, 2022; 3. "Virgo's Groove" Released: April 28, 2023; 4. "America Has a Problem" Released: May 19, 2023

Renaissance (stylized in all caps; also referred to as Act I: Renaissance) is the seventh studio album by American singer and songwriter Beyoncé. It was released on July 29, 2022, by Parkwood Entertainment and Columbia Records. The first installment of a planned trilogy of albums, Renaissance includes guest vocals from Beam, Grace Jones, and Tems.

Beyoncé conceived and recorded Renaissance during the COVID-19 pandemic, intending to inspire joy and escapism in listeners after a period of collective isolation. The album celebrates the club culture that served as a refuge for Black and queer communities, and pays homage to the pioneers who shaped those spaces. Arranged like a continuous DJ mix, Renaissance incorporates post-1970s Black dance music styles—such as disco, house, funk—and pays homage to the overlooked contributions of the pioneers who shaped those genres. Its lyrical themes are primarily centered on escapism, hedonism, confidence, and self-expression.

The album was promoted with the Renaissance World Tour in 2023 and an accompanying concert film. Renaissance topped the charts of eleven countries, including Australia, Canada, France, New Zealand, the United Kingdom, and the United States. In the lattermost country, it became Beyoncé's seventh consecutive album to debut at number one on the Billboard 200, and was certified two-times platinum by the Recording Industry Association of America. Four singles supported the album: the US Billboard Hot 100 number-one "Break My Soul"; "Cuff It", her longest-charting song on the Hot 100; a remix of "America Has a Problem" featuring rapper Kendrick Lamar; and the Europe-only single "Virgo's Groove".

On release, Renaissance received universal acclaim from music critics, who praised it for its eclectic yet cohesive sound, celebratory tone, and Beyoncé's vocals. It topped year-end lists from major outlets, including The New York Times, Los Angeles Times, and Rolling Stone; the lattermost later included it on its list of the "500 Greatest Albums of All Time". After winning four of her nine nominations at the 65th Annual Grammy Awards—including Best Dance/Electronic Album—Beyoncé became the most awarded individual in Grammy history. The second installment of the trilogy, Cowboy Carter, followed on March 29, 2024.

== Background and conception ==
Through the late 2010s, American singer Beyoncé released several critically acclaimed, narrative-focused projects that examined and celebrated Black identity. She released her sixth studio album, Lemonade, on April 23, 2016, to critical praise and commercial success. It discusses Black womanhood, reconciliation, and heartbreak—particularly in light of her husband Jay-Z's alleged infidelity; one scholar referred to it as a "cinematic and sonic Afrodiasporic journey from betrayal to redemption". Her 2018 Coachella headlining performance—later chronicled in the Netflix documentary Homecoming and its accompanying live album—paid tribute to historically Black colleges and universities. Beyoncé released the soundtrack album The Lion King: The Gift in 2019, which was influenced by African musical styles and was produced by African producers; she accompanied it with the visual album Black Is King (2020).

Beyoncé told British Vogue in an interview that the COVID-19 pandemic changed her as a person, saying she spent much of that time focused on "building [her] legacy and representing [her] culture the best way [she knew] how", but eventually allowed herself to prioritize her own happiness. She described this period as her "most creative", using music-making as a means to counter feelings of isolation. As the lockdown began to end, she told Harper's Bazaar, "we are all ready to escape, travel, love, and laugh again. I feel a renaissance emerging, and I want to be part of nurturing that escape in any way possible". She wanted her seventh studio album, Renaissance, to be a celebration of the underappreciated Black queer pioneers of dance music, whose contributions had been unrecognized in the mainstream.

== Recording and production ==
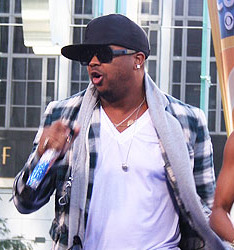
The-Dream co-wrote nine of the album's tracks.

Beyoncé began recording Renaissance around 2019–2020 amidst the COVID-19 pandemic; the entire process spanned nearly three years. The development process for Renaissance largely took place at studios throughout Los Angeles, with recording, production, and writing sessions for all tracks conducted at Parkwood West, Avenue A Studio West, and Juicy Juicy, as well as Sing Mastering in Atlanta.

Early sessions for Renaissance involved the songwriting and production duo Nova Wav, who had previously worked with Beyoncé on "Black Parade" (2020); the duo contributed to eight tracks on the album. The duo frequently created demos, which were later expanded by Beyoncé with a team of collaborators. Tracks such as "Cuff It", "Energy", and "Summer Renaissance" were written after periods of creative block and quickly drafted before being sent to Beyoncé. Others, including "Pure/Honey", were created directly in Beyoncé's studio, where the duo worked closely with her. The-Dream, who has written for Beyoncé since I Am... Sasha Fierce (2008), co-wrote nine tracks on Renaissance. While writing songs from his trailer, he recalled feeling as though he was "trying to get out of here", with that "hungry" feeling leading to lines like "Now, I just fell in love / And I just quit my job" on "Break My Soul".

Beyoncé worked closely with sound engineer Stuart White, her personal engineer and mixer since 2012, at his Avenue A Studio West. White handled vocal production, audio mixing, and recording throughout the process. Several songs were largely completed on the day they were recorded; for example, "I'm That Girl" was mostly written, recorded, and mixed in a single session. White recorded her vocals using a Telefunken ELA M 251 microphone, and he applied equalization, compression, and effects in real time during tracking. Much of the production and mixing was carried out simultaneously, with instrumentation, vocal layering, and effects developed during the recording process. Mike Dean helped produce, program, play synthesizers, and perform drums on six tracks. Producer Hit-Boy revealed that the song "Thique" was made in 2014, but the track did not fully materialize until Beyoncé picked it back up again eight years later for the album.

== Composition ==
=== Music and themes ===
Across Renaissance, you'll hear the rasp of her self-titled album, the gritty funk of 4 and B'Day, and the bright flirtatiousness of Dangerously in Love.

— Billboard critics in a review for Renaissance, 2022

Musically, Renaissance is a dance, house, pop, and R&B album, incorporating elements of disco, soul, funk, bounce, Chicago house, Detroit techno, and electro. Renaissance celebrates club cultures shaped by Black women and queer communities, which provided marginalized groups with spaces for expression and celebration. It pays homage to the contributions of Black pioneers to disco, house, and techno, alongside Black and Latinx ballroom and kiki scenes. The tracks are connected by seamless transitions facilitated by beatmatching, evoking a DJ mix. This reflects "the shifting moods and the physicality of the dance floor" rather than "the constraints of a radio station or a playlist", according to The New Yorker's Carrie Battan.

The album contains themes of escapism, self-assurance, self-expression, hedonism and pleasure, with Beyoncé aiming to inspire joy and confidence in listeners. She conceived Renaissance as a soundtrack for liberation during a time of global uncertainty, inspired in part by "Uncle" Johnny—her gay cousin (Note: John Edward Rittenhouse Jr. was nephew of Beyoncé's mother Tina Knowles-Lawson. Tina stated that, although Beyoncé and her sister Solange referred to him as "Uncle", Johnny was her nephew, not her brother.) who helped raise her until his death during the AIDS epidemic. According to The Guardian, it "urg[es] listeners to wholeheartedly embrace pleasure", particularly referencing joy in Black culture. The album's lyrics emphasize dance as both a measure of personal catharsis and a liberating spiritual practice. Time noted that Renaissance expands on the explorations of sexuality introduced on her fifth studio album, Beyoncé (2013), adopting a more explicit tone on tracks such as "Church Girl", "Thique", "Plastic Off the Sofa", and "Virgo's Groove". Similarly, Complex wrote that the "confident" themes of the album can be traced back to songs like "Flawless" (2013).

=== Songs ===
Renaissance opens with "I'm That Girl", a bass- and synth-driven track with a "murky" and atmospheric sound and themes of self-confidence. It features Beyoncé's rap-singing delivery, backed by the repeated, distorted refrain, "Please, motherfuckers ain't stopping me". It includes an interpolation of Tommy Wright III and Princess Loko's "Still Pimpin". It transitions into "Cozy", a Chicago house and deep house track with lyrics concerning self-love, empowerment, and trans empowerment. "Alien Superstar" is a staccato-driven, synthesizer-backed track that contains elements of ballroom language. It has been described as a pop homage to ballroom culture, with themes of individuality, Afrofuturism, and self-celebration. Its intro interpolates Right Said Fred's 1991 single "I'm Too Sexy", while the outro samples an autobiographical recording by writer Barbara Ann Teer.

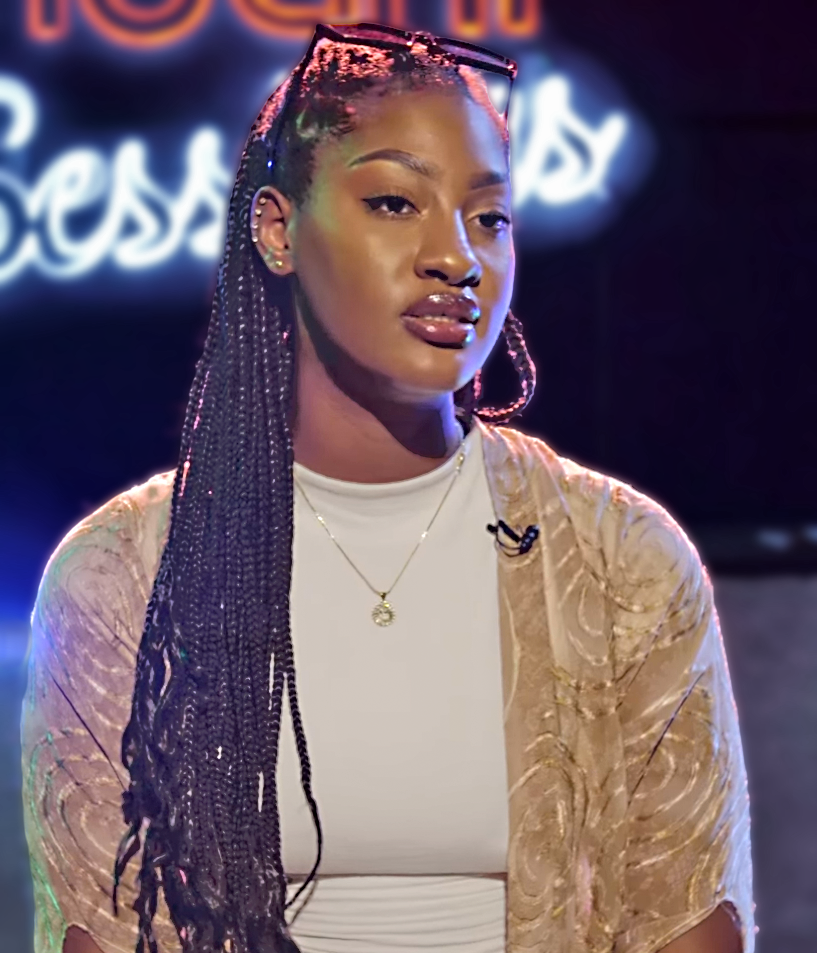
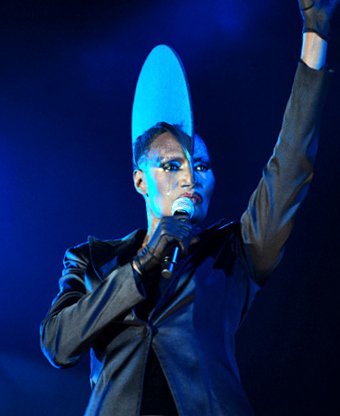
Three people guest appear on the album: Beam, Tems (left), and Grace Jones (right).

The fourth track, "Cuff It", is a retro disco–funk song centered on themes of romantic excitement, physical attraction, and uninhibited expression on the dance floor. "Energy" is a minimal, onomatopoeic, Afrobeats-infused track, incorporating funk and bass elements. A bridge between the tracks "Cuff It" and "Break My Soul", it is one of two tracks on the album to feature another artist, rapper and singer Beam. Both "Cuff It" and "Energy" interpolate "Ooo La La La" (1988), performed by Teena Marie. As "Energy" transitions into "Break My Soul" in its closing seconds, it introduces a sample of Big Freedia's "Explode" (2014).

"Break My Soul" is a dance-pop, house, and diva house song. Lyrically, it is centered on themes of liberation from a demanding job and the pressures of the pandemic. In addition to the sample of Freedia's "Explode", "Break My Soul" also samples Robin S.'s house-pop track "Show Me Love" (1993). An R&B and New Orleans bounce song, "Church Girl" explores themes of bodily autonomy, spiritual liberation, and the rejection of religious and societal expectations placed on Black women, inviting those with religious upbringings to move beyond patriarchal constraints on their sexuality. It samples "Center of Thy Will" by gospel group the Clark Sisters and "Drag Rap" by the Showboys, and interpolates DJ Jimi's "Where They At".

The eighth track, "Plastic Off the Sofa", is a neo-soul track with alternative R&B influences, described by Variety as "the closest thing to a ballad on Renaissance". Lyrically, it discusses the ability to navigate and express the nuances of everyday life despite a globally prominent status. "Virgo's Groove", the album's longest track, is a disco–funk love song built on upbeat handclaps, slap bass, and airy synth textures. The song features layered vocal harmonies and a structure that forgoes a conventional pop format in favor of extended grooves, ad-libs, and call-and-response sections. The tenth track, "Move", blends Afrobeats and house and features guest vocals from Grace Jones and Tems. Jones, who previously criticized Beyoncé in her memoir I'll Never Write My Memoirs (2015), contributes spoken-word vocals.

"Heated" is an Afrobeats and dancehall track, with elements of ballroom language. It finds Beyoncé delivering braggadocious, rapid-fire verses while paying tribute to her "Uncle" Johnny. The dubstep-oriented hip-hop track "Thique" incorporates trap rap and trap-influenced drums layered over a muted techno-style bassline. Thematically, it is a song about body positivity. "All Up in Your Mind" features a woozy bassline and "laser-like" synths, and explores a synth-pop sound reminiscent of Lady Gaga's Chromatica (2020). "America Has a Problem" is an electro-funk and hip-hop-influenced song built on stark synth chords and rapid, percussive beats. It uses addiction as a metaphor for desirability and samples Kilo Ali's 1990 track "Cocaine".

The fifteenth track, "Pure/Honey", is split into two parts: "Pure", a "steely and sexy" ballroom track, and "Honey", a "paisley and passionate" disco track. "Pure" samples "Feels Like" by MikeQ and Kevin Jz Prodigy, and "Cunty" (Wave Mix) (1996) by Kevin Aviance. It features sharp synth–bass-led instrumentation with Beyoncé rapping in the same vein as a ballroom emcee. "Honey" samples "Miss Honey" (1992) by Moi Renée, and sees Beyoncé singing over a funk-influenced brass production. Renaissance closes with "Summer Renaissance", which contains elements and interpolations of "I Feel Love" (1977) by Donna Summer and "Mystery of Love" (1985) by Larry Heard. It is a disco and house song driven by synthesizers, centered on the power of the club, with Beyoncé singing about a connection formed over the course of the night.

== Release and promotion ==
Beyoncé originally intended Cowboy Carter (2024) to serve as the first installment of her planned trilogy, but later explained that "with the pandemic, there was too much heaviness in the world", prompting her to release Renaissance first, as "[people] deserved to dance". She began teasing the project on June 7, 2022, by removing her profile picture across all social media platforms. Four days later, the phrase "What is a B7?" appeared on the homepage of her official website. Fans also observed a placeholder labeled "B8", which was interpreted as a reference to a future eighth studio album. Beyoncé officially announced Renaissance on June 16, alongside the launch of pre-orders via her website and digital streaming platforms.

On June 20, 2022, Beyoncé announced that the album's lead single, "Break My Soul", would be released at midnight Eastern Time on June 21, aligning with the 2022 summer solstice. The track was made available several hours early on Tidal on June 20, followed by the release of a lyric video via YouTube. "Break My Soul" peaked at number one on the US Billboard Hot 100 for two weeks, becoming her eighth chart-topper as a solo artist, as well as her first solo number-one without a featured artist since "Single Ladies (Put a Ring on It)" (2008). It also reached number six on the Billboard Global 200. After joining TikTok in December 2021, Beyoncé posted her first video on July 14, 2022—a compilation of users, including rapper Cardi B, "dancing, vibing, and singing along" to "Break My Soul". She also made her entire catalog available for use on the platform, which drew media attention.

On July 27, two days before its scheduled release, Renaissance was distributed early to retailers in France and subsequently leaked online. It was officially released on July 29, 2022. Upon its release, Beyoncé shared a note on her official website confirming that the album serves as the first installment of a trilogy project recorded over the preceding three years during the COVID-19 pandemic. Critics observed that Renaissance received a more conventional rollout compared to several of her previous projects, which had been surprise releases—a strategy Beyoncé popularized. The New York Times noted that the album's release strategy mirrored its retro-inspired sound, with Beyoncé opting against an exclusive digital release in favor of elaborate vinyl and CD editions. According to Billboard, this approach contributed to a resurgence in CD sales.

"Church Girl" and "Cuff It" were initially scheduled to impact rhythmic contemporary radio on October 4, 2022. However, "Cuff It" was ultimately issued as the album's sole second single, first sent to radio in France on September 30, 2022, before impacting rhythmic and urban contemporary radio in the US on October 4. "Cuff It" peaked at number six on the Billboard Hot 100, becoming the 21st top-ten entry of Beyoncé's solo career. On April 11, 2023, it became her longest-charting solo entry on the chart, reaching a thirty-fourth week and surpassing "Telephone" (2010), her collaboration with Lady Gaga, which spent 33 weeks on the chart. "Virgo's Groove" was sent to European radio stations in April 2023 as the album's third single. Beyoncé did not release any accompanying music videos for the album because she "wanted the focus to remain on her voice and the music itself" and according to her, "visual[s] can be a distraction from the quality of the voice and the music".

=== Cover art ===
On June 30, 2022, Beyoncé unveiled the album's cover art via her social media accounts. Shot by Carlijn Jacobs, the image depicts her seated atop a mirrored disco ball horse—dubbed "Reneigh" by fans—while wearing a 3D-printed silver bodysuit designed by Nusi Quero. (Note: Cited to multiple sources:) The helix-shaped piece is adorned with spikes and embellished with crystals. Critics interpreted the equestrian imagery as referencing John Collier's 1897 painting Lady Godiva and photographs of Bianca Jagger arriving on horseback at Studio 54. An alternate cover for the vinyl edition features Beyoncé atop the same horse, wearing a white cowboy hat with a silver headpiece obscuring her hair, alongside draped silver chains and feathered detailing across the horse’s body. Behind her is Luca Giordano's 1690 painting La Conversion de Saint Paul, depicting the Conversion of Paul the Apostle. The equestrian motif was later continued on her next album, Cowboy Carter.

=== Touring ===
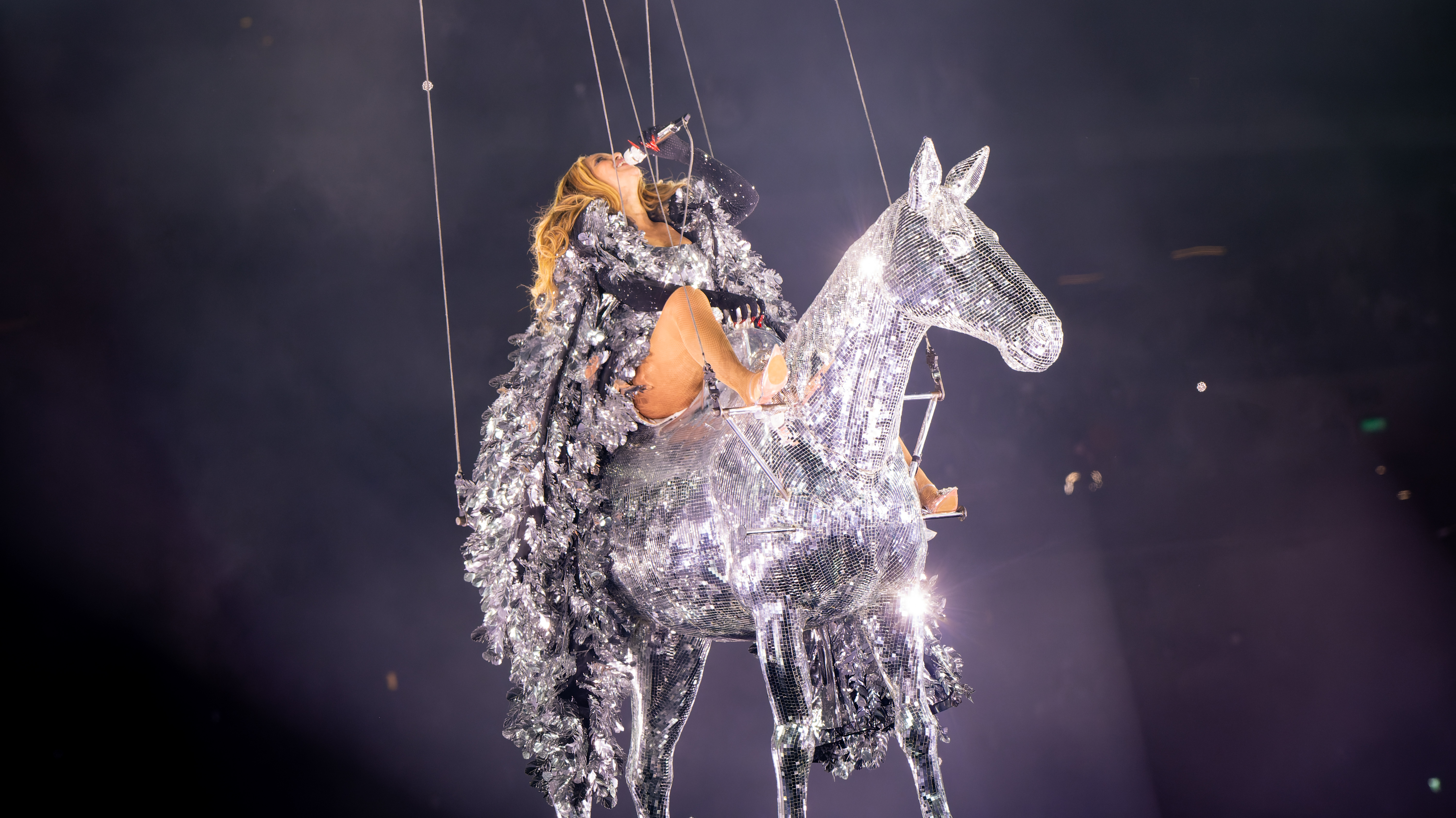
Beyoncé atop a crystal horse during the Renaissance World Tour

Beyoncé did not stage any live performances in support of the record until the Renaissance World Tour. Her only performance before the tour was a private concert at Atlantis The Royal in Dubai in January 2023; the setlist did not include material from Renaissance. On February 1, 2023, Beyoncé announced the Renaissance World Tour via her Instagram account. It began on May 10, 2023, visiting Sweden, Belgium, the UK, France, Germany, Netherlands, Spain, Poland, Canada, and the US. The tour was met praise from critics; The New York Times wrote that Beyoncé "is the rare major pop star who prizes live vocal prowess", while Vogue wrote that she "upended the typical stadium show model and turned it into an ever-changing format".

By the end of its run, the Renaissance World Tour had grossed over $579 million, ranking as the seventh highest-grossing concert tour of all time, as well as the highest-grossing tour by a woman and by a Black artist. The final show of the Renaissance World Tour, held at Arrowhead Stadium in Kansas City, Missouri, on October 1, 2023, concluded with the debut of a trailer for Renaissance: A Film by Beyoncé. The film, released on December 1, 2023, documents the tour while incorporating behind-the-scenes footage of the album and tour's development. A non-album track, "My House", plays over the end credits and was released as a single the same day as the film.

=== Renaissance couture ===
In July 2022, Olivier Rousteing, creative director of Balmain, was inspired by Renaissance to sketch designs relating the album's songs and lyrics. He further developed these sketches during a vacation in August and presented the concept to Beyoncé and her stylist Marni Senofonte, proposing a collaborative couture collection. Over the next five months, they created a Balmain x Beyoncé couture line inspired by both the house's history and the artist's musical impact. The collection comprises sixteen pieces corresponding to the album's sixteen tracks, two of which were worn by Beyoncé at the 65th Annual Grammy Awards (2023) and the Brit Awards 2023. Rousteing expressed his gratitude to Beyoncé for launching the collaboration and partnering with him to design the collection. He also said that he is the first Black person to lead a Parisian couture house and stated his belief that Beyoncé is the first Black woman to oversee a collection for such a house. Beyoncé appeared on the cover of the April 2023 issue of Vogue France to promote the collection.

== Commercial performance ==
Renaissance was a commercial success, topping the charts of twelve countries. (Note: Cited in § Charts) It was the seventeenth best-selling album of 2023, according to the International Federation of the Phonographic Industry.

In the United States, Renaissance debuted at number one on the Billboard 200, selling 332,000 album-equivalent units in its first week—the second-most of any album by a woman in 2022, and the third-most overall. Of that total, 190,000 units came from physical sales. It recorded 179.06 million streams in its first week, the largest weekly streaming week by a woman in 2022 at the time. Renaissance extended her record as the first female artist to debut her first seven studio albums at number one in the US. Following its release, all tracks from Renaissance charted on the Billboard Hot 100 in the chart dated August 13, 2022. All fifteen new tracks debuted within the top seventy positions, while the previously released lead single "Break My Soul" rose to number one, marking Beyoncé's second album to have every track chart simultaneously, after Lemonade (2016). Renaissance became her first album since I Am... Sasha Fierce (2008) to yield multiple top-ten singles in the US: "Break My Soul" and "Cuff It". In the country, the album is certified two-times platinum by the Recording Industry Association of America.

By its second day of release, Renaissance was outselling the rest of the week's top five best-selling albums combined in the United Kingdom. The album debuted at number one on the UK Albums Chart, becoming Beyoncé's fourth solo album to do so. It also debuted atop the Official Vinyl Albums Chart. In Ireland, Renaissance debuted at number one on the Irish Albums Chart, becoming Beyoncé’s fifth chart-topping album in the country. Simultaneously, "Break My Soul" reached number one on the Irish Singles Chart, scoring her a "chart double". In France, Renaissance debuted at number one on the SNEP albums chart, becoming Beyoncé's first chart-topping album and her fourth top-ten entry in the country. It also marked the first album by a female artist to reach number one on the chart in 2022. In Australia, Renaissance debuted at number one on the ARIA Albums Chart, becoming Beyoncé’s third consecutive chart-topping album in the country, following Beyoncé and Lemonade. Elsewhere, the album topped charts in Canada, the Netherlands, and New Zealand.

== Critical reception ==
Professional ratings
Aggregate scores
Source	Rating
AnyDecentMusic?	8.6/10
Metacritic	91/100
Review scores
Source	Rating
AllMusic	4.5/5 stars
And It Don't Stop	A+
Clash	9/10
Entertainment Weekly	A
Exclaim!	10/10
The Guardian	4/5 stars
MusicOMH	4.5/5 stars
NME	4/5 stars
Pitchfork	9.0/10
Rolling Stone	4.5/5 stars

On release, Renaissance was met with universal acclaim from critics. They primarily praised its cohesive yet eclectic production, joyous nature, vocal performances from Beyoncé, and celebration of post-1970s Black dance music. At review aggregator Metacritic, which assigns a weighted mean rating out of 100 to reviews from mainstream critics, Renaissance received an average score of 91, based on 26 reviews, indicating "universal acclaim".

Some reviewers deemed Renaissance an instant classic. Robert Christgau hailed it as "the album of the year" and Beyoncé's "finest album", calling it unconventionally political, "erotically explicit, knowledgeable, and felt", with each song a "shrewdly differentiated pop smash". Characterizing it as a "modern classic" and Beyoncé's most impressive album, Exclaim!'s Vernon Ayiku wrote that Renaissance is "the sound of a once-in-a-generation superstar performing at her peak". According to Kyle Denis of Billboard, it is an "absolutely stunning body of work", and perhaps Beyoncé's most innovative and experimental album with her "most nuanced vocal performances". Ann Powers described Renaissance as "Beyoncé's Sistine Chapel", with its "stunning" design and detail, multifaceted nature and "timeless" impact.

Other critics commended the album's themes and its celebration of Black disco and house pioneers. Describing the album as an "intergenerational musical exchange that landed like a cultural comet", Robyn Mowatt of Okayplayer praised Beyoncé's ability to unite dance pioneers such as Grace Jones and Nile Rodgers with contemporary underground artists. Writing for The Line of Best Fit, David Cobbald regarded the album as amongst her best and lauded its departure from her earlier work and its celebration of "underappreciated architects" of disco, house, and funk. Kate Solomon, writing for i, described the record as a "dazzling tribute to underground and underappreciated Black culture", framing it as a dancefloor-oriented project intended to alleviate the "pain and anguish" of the COVID-19 pandemic. In USA Today, Melissa Ruggieri characterized it as "a danceteria devoted to hedonism, sex and, most importantly, self-worth".

Reviewers noted Renaissance's composition, particularly Beyoncé's vocals and its production. Wesley Morris, writing in The New York Times, called her vocal performance, delivery, and range "galactic". Mikael Wood of the Los Angeles Times described the album as "the year's smartest record [and] also its most deep-feeling", praising its rhythms, harmonies, and vocals. In a Pitchfork review, Julianne Escobedo Shepherd called it a "challenging, densely-referenced album" that engages with dance and club music more effectively than similar works by Beyoncé's peers. Marcus Shorter of Consequence described Renaissance as "damn close to perfect", citing its "infectious and not overbearing, elegant, but not shallow" songwriting. John Amen of PopMatters liked its contemporary production and dense layering of "samples, allusions, and tributes", though noted it prioritizes style over substance at times. Kiana Mickles of Resident Advisor commended the album's experimental production and genre blending, but argued that it "falls flat" in its engagement with Black and Brown queer ballroom culture.

=== Year-end rankings ===
At the end of 2022, Renaissance appeared atop multiple critics' lists ranking the year's best albums. According to Metacritic, it was the most frequently ranked number one, appearing atop twenty-five publications' year-end lists.

Selected year-end rankings of Renaissance
Publication	List	Rank	Ref.
The A.V. Club	The 30 Best Albums of 2022	1	
Clash	Albums of the Year 2022	1	
Entertainment Weekly	The 10 Best Albums of 2022	1	
The Guardian	The 50 Best Albums of 2022	1	
The Hollywood Reporter	The 10 Best Albums of 2022	1	
Los Angeles Times	The 20 Best Albums of 2022	1	
NPR	Best Albums of 2022	1	
Pitchfork	The 50 Best Albums of 2022	1	
Rolling Stone	The 100 Best Albums of 2022	1	
Vulture	The Best Albums of 2022	1	

== Accolades ==
Renaissance was the most nominated album at the 65th Annual Grammy Awards, receiving eight (Note: Beyoncé received nine nominations in total that night: eight for Renaissance and its songs, and one for "Be Alive".) nominations including Album of the Year, Song of the Year, and Record of the Year. The nominations tied Beyoncé with Jay-Z as the most nominated artists in Grammy history. Her four wins at the ceremony raised her career total to 32 Grammy Awards, making her the most awarded artist in Grammy history and surpassing Georg Solti's previous record of 31 wins. Pitchfork ranked the record as the fifth-best album of the 2020s so far in its list of the 100 best music projects released between 2020 and 2024. In 2025, Paste placed Renaissance at number eight on its list of the best albums of the 21st century so far. On its list of the "500 Greatest Albums of All Time" (2023), Rolling Stone ranked the album at number seventy-one.

Awards and nominations
Organization	Year	Award	Result	Ref.
American Music Awards	2022	Favorite Pop/Rock Album	Nominated	
American Music Awards	2022	Favorite Soul/R&B Album	Won	
Danish Music Awards	2022	International Album of the Year	Nominated	
People's Choice Awards	2022	The Album of 2022	Nominated	
Soul Train Music Awards	2022	Best Album of the Year	Won	
BET Awards	2023	Album of the Year	Won (Note: Tied with SZA's SOS.)	
Billboard Music Awards	2023	Top Dance/Electronic Album	Won	
Billboard Music Awards	2023	Top R&B Album	Nominated	
Fonogram – Hungarian Music Awards	2023	Foreign Modern Pop-Rock Album of the Year	Nominated	
GAFFA Awards (Denmark)	2023	International Release of the Year	Nominated	
Grammy Awards	2023	Album of the Year	Nominated	
Grammy Awards	2023	Best Dance/Electronic Album	Won	
iHeartRadio Music Awards	2023	R&B Album of the Year	Won	
Kids' Choice Awards	2023	Favorite Album	Nominated	
MTV Video Music Awards	2023	Album of the Year	Nominated	
NAACP Image Awards	2023	Outstanding Album	Won	
Urban Music Awards	2023	Best Album	Nominated	

== Impact ==
=== Cultural influence ===
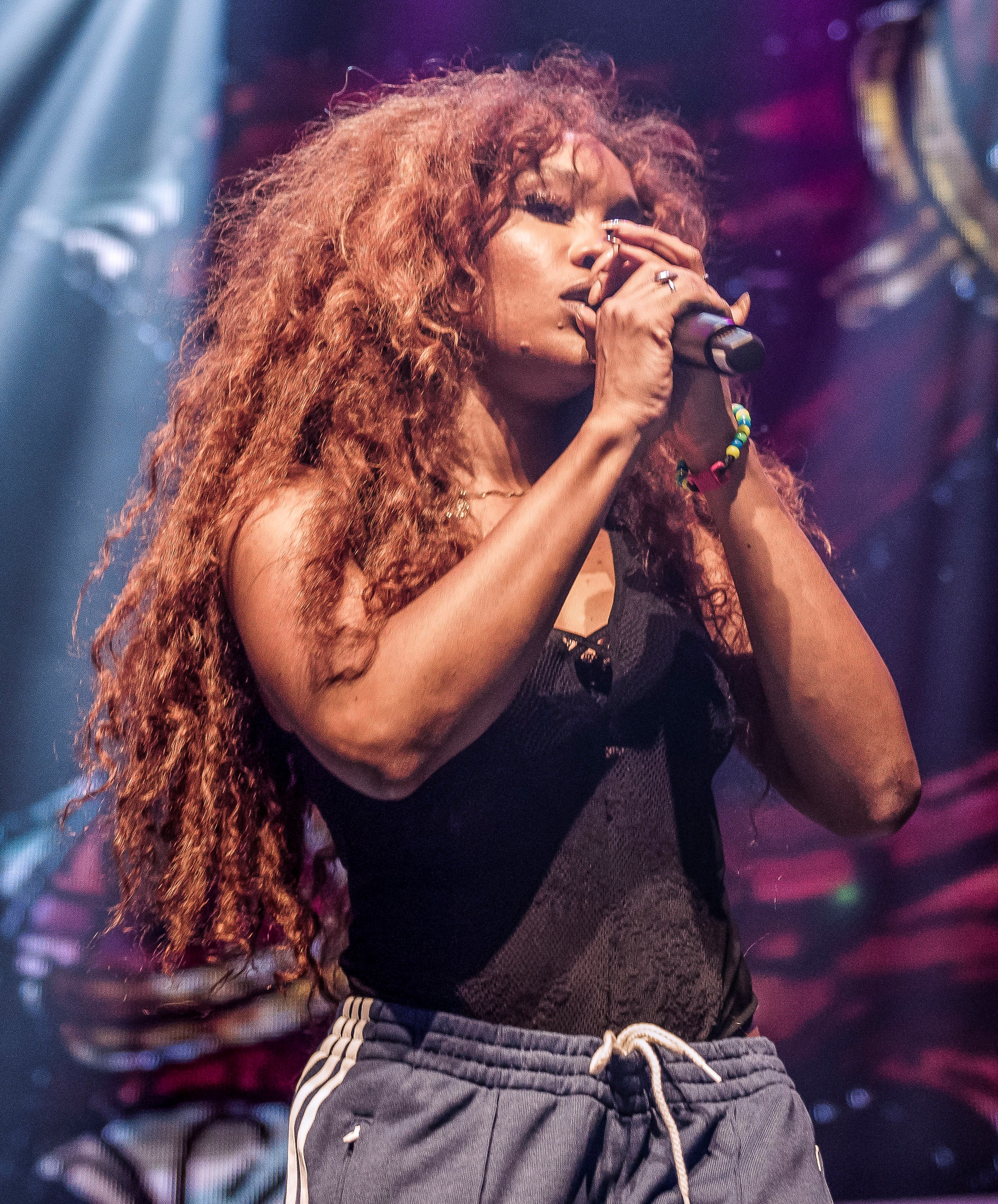
American singer SZA said that she wanted to defy expectations in the same way Beyoncé did on Renaissance.

Upon its release, Renaissance prompted wider critical discussion about the history of dance music and its foundations in Black cultural expression. The Conversation credited the album with reviving disco and dance-oriented pop music, introducing it to a new generation of listeners and bringing it to the forefront of popular culture. The Grammy Awards website stated that Renaissance helped bring the history of Black-created genres back into global consciousness.

Several industry figures responded positively to the release; American singer Crystal Waters, a key figure in bringing house music into the mainstream in the 1990s, expressed appreciation for the way Beyoncé spotlighted underrecognized house vocalists, while Chicago house DJ Ron Carroll praised the album for reintroducing house music to radio and encouraging other artists to follow Beyoncé's example. Aluna Francis—from electronic music duo AlunaGeorge—praised Renaissance for elevating dance music's Black creators and stated that it represented a long-awaited shift in recognition of Black contributions to the genre and reinforced that dance music is rooted in Black culture.

Other musicians also praised the album for its cultural impact and musical composition. American singer SZA described the album as one of the most significant risks taken by a mainstream artist in recent years, and said it largely inspired her own desire to defy expectations. British singer-songwriter Ellie Goulding said that Renaissance restored her faith in pop music at a time when she felt the genre was moving in the wrong direction. American musician Sufjan Stevens praised the album's production in an interview with Stereogum, applauding its "wizardry" and saying that even without Beyoncé's vocals he remained captivated by its engineering, harmonic structure, and overall arrangement.

Vox described Beyoncé's artistic and cultural evolution through the 2020s—propelled by Renaissance—as one of the decade's "most important pop culture stories". Rolling Stone declared the album proved Beyoncé to be "the only sovereign of pop to have truly evolved artistically while also expanding an enormous commercial empire". Considered by many critics and journalists to be the frontrunner for Album of the Year at the 65th Annual Grammy Awards, Renaissance losing to Harry's House by Harry Styles was widely described as a snub or upset. Some commentators attributed Beyoncé's continued absence from the category's top prize to the Recording Academy's perceived failure to fully recognize or appropriately value Black female artists and African American musical traditions.

=== Artists' reactions and controversies ===
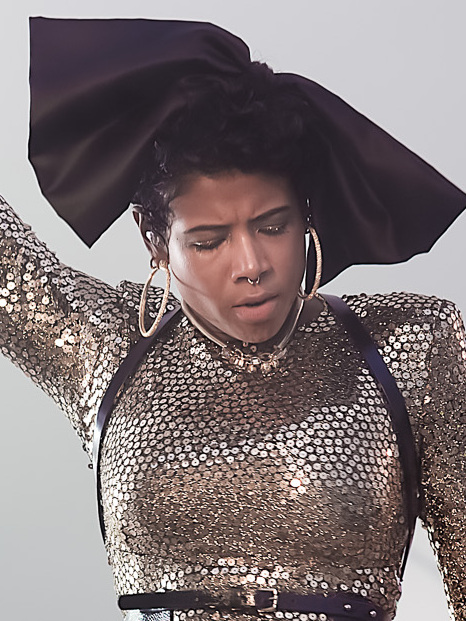
Kelis took issue with the interpolation of her song "Milkshake" (2003) on Beyoncé's "Energy".

Generally, artists who were featured, sampled, or interpolated on Renaissance reacted positively to their contributions. Jamaican singer Grace Jones, featured on "Move", noted she rarely collaborates but joined Beyoncé as she is "a beautiful person, a beautiful talent" who attends the same church as Jones' brother. American television personality Ts Madison, sampled via her viral "Bitch, I'm Black" clip on "Cozy," thanked Beyoncé for letting her "use my voice" and affirming "we are all Black in totality" worldwide. Other artists expressing gratitude for their inclusions on Renaissance were Kevin Aviance, whose "Cunty" is sampled on "Pure/Honey"; and ballroom commentator Kevin JZ Prodigy, whose chants from the 2009 MikeQ track "Feels Like" also appear on "Pure/Honey".

A few artists took issue with their inclusion on the album. American singer-songwriter Kelis objected to the interpolation of her 2003 single "Milkshake" on "Energy". Although Beyoncé had cleared it with the sole writers and producers—Pharrell Williams and Chad Hugo of the Neptunes—Kelis criticized the arrangement as exploitative and demanded prior notification. The interpolation was subsequently removed from "Energy". British tabloid The Sun reported that English pop duo Right Said Fred claimed Beyoncé used their 1991 single "I'm Too Sexy" on "Alien Superstar" without permission; Beyoncé's team refuted this, confirming clearance on June 15, 2022—after a May 11 request—and noting the duo's prior appreciation of the sample via social media.

The song "Heated" drew online criticism for its use of the word "spaz" in the lyrics, which disability advocate Hannah Diviney called an ableist slur; some fans agreed. Some users countered that "spaz" holds a different meaning in African-American English, akin to "freaking out". Beyoncé promptly removed the word from "Heated", replacing it with "blast".

== Track listing ==
Renaissance track listing
No.	Title	Lyrics	Music	Producer(s)	Length
1.	"I'm That Girl"	Beyoncé; Terius Gesteelde-Diamant	Beyoncé; Diamant; Andrea Summers; Kelman Duran; Michael Dean; Tommy Wright III	Beyoncé; Kelman Duran; Mike Dean^{[a]}; Symbolyc One^{[b]}; Jameil Aossey^{[b]}; Stuart White^{[b]}	3:28
2.	"Cozy"	Beyoncé; Nija Charles; Gesteelde-Diamant; Ts Madison	Beyoncé; Charles; Gesteelde-Diamant; Honey Redmond; Christopher Penny; Luke Solomon; Dave Giles II; Dean; Corece Smith; Curtis Jones; Kim Cooper; Peter Rauhofer	Beyoncé; Honey Dijon; Chris Penny; Solomon; Dean^{[a]}	3:30
3.	"Alien Superstar"	Beyoncé; Shawn Carter; Atia Boggs; Barbara Ann Teer	Beyoncé; Carter; Boggs; David Brown; Danielle Balbuena; Rami Yacoub; Saliou Diagne; Redmond; Penny; Solomon; Denisia Andrews; Brittany Coney; Dave Hamelin; Leven Kali; Levar Coppin; Dean; Rob Manzoli; Richard Fairbrass; Christopher Fairbrass; John Holiday; Kim Cooper; Peter Rauhofer	Beyoncé; Honey Dijon; Penny; Solomon; The-Dream^{[a]}; Dean^{[a]}; Nova Wav^{[b]}; Kali^{[b]}	3:35
4.	"Cuff It"	Beyoncé; Andrews; Coney; Gesteelde-Diamant	Beyoncé; Nova Wav; Morten Ristorp; Raphael Saadiq; Gesteelde-Diamant; Teena Marie; Allen McGrier; Nile Rodgers	Beyoncé; Nova Wav; Rissi^{[a]}; Saadiq^{[a]}; The-Dream^{[b]}	3:45
5.	"Energy" (featuring Beam)	Beyoncé; Tyshane Thompson; Gesteelde-Diamant	Beyoncé; Thompson; Gesteelde-Diamant; Almando Cresso; Jordan Douglas; Tizita Makuria; Sonny Moore; Andrews; Coney; Marie; McGrier; Pharrell Williams; Chad Hugo; Adam Pigott; Freddie Ross	Beyoncé; Beam; Skrillex; Al Cres; Nova Wav^{[b]}	1:56
6.	"Break My Soul"	Gesteelde-Diamant; Ross; Carter	Beyoncé; Christopher Stewart; Allen George; Fred McFarlane; Pigott; Ross	Beyoncé; The-Dream; Tricky Stewart; Jens Christian Isaken^{[a]}	4:38
7.	"Church Girl"	Beyoncé; Gesteelde-Diamant	Ernest Wilson; Elbernita Clark; Jimi Payton; Dion Norman; Derrick Ordogne; James Brown; Orville Hall; Phillip Price; Ralph MacDonald; William Salter	Beyoncé; No I.D.; The-Dream; White^{[b]}	3:44
8.	"Plastic Off the Sofa"	Sydney Bennett; Sabrina Claudio	Beyoncé; Nick Green; Patrick Paige II	Beyoncé; Syd; Kali^{[b]}	4:14
9.	"Virgo's Groove"	Dustin Bowie; Darius Scott; Jocelyn Donald; Andrews; Coney	Beyoncé; Andrews; Coney; Kali; Jesse Wilson; Solomon Cole; Daniel Memmi	Beyoncé; Kali; The-Dream^{[b]}	6:08
10.	"Move" (featuring Grace Jones and Tems)	Beyoncé; Andrews; Coney; Temilade Openiyi	Beyoncé; Andrews; ConeyRichard Isong; Ronald Banful	Beyoncé; P2J; GuiltyBeatz^{[a]}; MeLo-X^{[b]}; The-Dream^{[b]}; White^{[b]}	3:23
11.	"Heated"	Beyoncé; Aubrey Graham; Andrews; Coney; Ricky Lawson; Clarence Coffee Jr.	Beyoncé; Sean Seaton; Rupert Thomas Jr.; Jahaan Sweet; Matthew Samuels; Oliver Rodigan; Travis Garland; Aviel Calev Hirschfield; Jeremy Reeves; Jonathan Yip; Malcolm McDaniel; Ray Charles McCullough II; Ray Romulus	Beyoncé; Neenyo; Sevn Thomas; Sweet; Boi-1da; Cadenza^{[a]}; Calev^{[b]}; Duran^{[b]}; White^{[b]}; Harry Edwards^{[b]}	4:20
12.	"Thique"	Beyoncé; Gesteelde-Diamant; Boggs	Beyoncé; Chauncey Hollis Jr.; Boggs; Julian Mason; Jabbar Stevens; Cherdericka Nichols	Beyoncé; Hit-Boy; LilJuMadeDaBeat^{[a]}; White^{[b]}; Ink^{[b]}	4:04
13.	"All Up in Your Mind"	Beyoncé; Stevens; Nichols	Beyoncé; Michael Tucker; Alexander Cook; Dean; Larry Griffin Jr.; Jameil Aossey	Beyoncé; BAH; BloodPop^{[a]}; A. G. Cook^{[a]}; Dean^{[a]}; Symbolyc One^{[a]}; Jameil Aossey^{[a]}; The-Dream^{[b]}	2:49
14.	"America Has a Problem"	Beyoncé; Gesteelde-Diamant; Carter	Beyoncé; Gesteelde-Diamant; Dean; Andrell Rogers; Tino McIntosh	Beyoncé; The-Dream; Dean^{[a]}	3:18
15.	"Pure/Honey"	Beyoncé; Moi Renée; Scott; Andrews; Coony	Beyoncé; Michael Pollack; Eric Snead; Count Maurice; Kevin Bellmon Richard Cowie Tucker; Andrews; Coney; Gesteelde-Diamant; Saadiq; Jerel Black; Michael Cox	Beyoncé; BloodPop; Nova Wav; Saadiq^{[b]}; The-Dream^{[b]}; White^{[b]}; Dean^{[b]}	4:48
16.	"Summer Renaissance"	Beyoncé; Boggs; Coppin; Diagne; Lawson	Beyoncé; Andrews; Coney; Gesteelde-Diamant; Kali; Dean; Donna Summer; Giorgio Moroder; Peter Bellotte; Larry Heard	Beyoncé; Nova Wav; Dean^{[a]}; The-Dream^{[b]}; Kali^{[b]}; Sol Was^{[b]}	4:34
Total length:					62:14

Notes

- ^{^[a]} indicates a co-producer
- ^{^[b]} indicates an additional producer

=== Samples and interpolations ===
Mostly adapted from Billboard

- "I'm That Girl"
  - contains elements of "Still Pimpin", written by Tommy Wright III and Andrea Summers and performed by Tommy Wright III & Princess Loko.
- "Cozy"
  - contains an excerpt of "Bitch I'm Black" by Ts Madison
  - contains a sample of "Get with U", written by Curtis Alan Jones and performed by Lidell Townsell & M.T.F.
  - contains a sample of "Unique", written by Kim Cooper and Peter Rauhofer and performed by Danube Dance.
- "Alien Superstar"
  - contains an interpolation of "I'm Too Sexy", written by Rob Manzoli, Richard Fairbrass, and Christopher Fairbrass and performed by Right Said Fred.
  - contains a sample of "Moonraker", written by John Michael Cooper and performed by Foremost Poets.
  - contains a sample of Barbara Ann Teer's "Black Theatre" speech.
  - contains a sample of "Unique", written by Kim Cooper and Peter Rauhofer and performed by Danube Dance.
- "Cuff It"
  - contains an interpolation of "Ooh La La La", written by Teena Marie and Allen McGrier and performed by Teena Marie.
- "Energy"
  - contains an interpolation of "Ooh La La La", written by Teena Marie and Allen McGrier and performed by Teena Marie.
  - contains a sample of "Explode", written by Freddie Ross and Adam Piggot and performed by Big Freedia.
  - contains an interpolation of "Milkshake", written by Pharrell Williams and Chad Hugo and performed by Kelis (later removed on digital and streaming versions).
- "Break My Soul"
  - contains elements of "Show Me Love", written by Allen George and Fred McFarlane and performed by Robin S.
  - contains a sample of "Explode", written by Freddie Ross and Adam Piggot and performed by Big Freedia.
- "Church Girl"
  - contains a sample of "Center of Thy Will", written by Elbernita Clark and performed by The Clark Sisters.
  - contains elements and interpolations of "Where They At", written by Jimi Payton, Dion Norman, and Derrick Ordogne and performed by DJ Jimi.
  - contains elements and interpolations of "Think (About It)", written by James Brown and performed by Lyn Collins.
  - contains elements of "Drag Rap (Triggerman)", written by Orville Hall and Phillip Price and performed by the Showboys.
  - contains a sample of "Mister Magic" written by Ralph MacDonald and William Salter and performed by Grover Washington Jr.
- "Heated"
  - contains a sample of "Where to Land", written by Travis Garland and The Stereotypes and performed by Travis Garland.
- "America Has a Problem"
  - contains a sample of "Cocaine", written by Tino McIntosh and Andrell Rogers and performed by Kilo Ali.
- "Pure/Honey"
  - contains a sample of "Miss Honey", written by Andrew Richardson, Count Maurice, and Moi Renée and performed by Moi Renée.
  - contains a sample of "Cunty (Wave Mix)", written by Eric Snead and Jerel Black and performed by Kevin Aviance.
  - contains a sample of "Feels Like", written by Michael Cox and Kevin Bellmon and performed by MikeQ & Kevin Jz Prodigy.
- "Summer Renaissance"
  - contains elements and interpolations of "I Feel Love" written by Donna Summer, Giorgio Moroder, and Pete Bellotte and performed by Donna Summer.
  - contains elements and interpolations of "Mystery of Love" written by Larry Heard.

== Credits and personnel ==
=== Recording locations ===
Atlanta, Georgia

- Sing Mastering (1–16)
- Tree Sound Studios (3, 16)

Los Angeles, California

- Avenue A Studio West (1–16)
- Hardcover (13)
- Henson Recording Studios (6, 11)
- The Juicy Juicy (1–16)
- Kings Landing West (5, 8–12, 15–16)
- Nightbird Recording Studios (3)
- Parkwood West (1–16)
- Record Plant (2, 15)

New York City, New York

- Trailer East Hampton (1, 3, 5–7, 11–12, 14)

North Hollywood, California

- Blakeslee Studios (3,15)

Ocho Rios, Jamaica

- Zak Starkey Studio (10)

Westport, Connecticut

- Le Crib (3)

=== Personnel ===
- Beyoncé – vocals (all tracks), programming (tracks 1, 15), horn (15), vocal production
- Beam – vocals (4, 5, 11), drums (5)
- Grace Jones – vocals (10)
- Tems – vocals (10)
- The-Dream – background vocals (1, 11), synthesizer (3, 4, 9), programming (7, 14), drums (13, 15)
- Kelman Duran – programming (1, 11)
- Stuart White – programming (1), drums (7, 11, 12, 15)
- Mike Dean – synthesizer (1–3, 13, 14, 16), drums (13), programming (16)
- Nija Charles – background vocals (2)
- Chris Penny – keyboards (2, 3), programming (2–4)
- Honey Dijon – programming (2–4)
- Luke Solomon – programming (2–4)
- Dave Giles – vocals (2)
- Blu June – background vocals (3, 15)
- Raphael Saadiq – bass, clavichord, drums, strings (4); horn (15)
- Nile Rodgers – guitar (4)
- Sheila E. – percussion (4)
- Daniel Crawford – piano (4)
- Scott Mayo – saxophone (4)
- Lemar Guillary – trombone (4)
- Jamella Adisa – trumpet (4)
- Al Cres – drums (5)
- Skrillex – drums (5)
- Nova Wav – synthesizer (5)
- The Samples (Note: The Samples choir consists of Alexandria Griffin, Anthony McEastland, Ashley Washington, Ashly Williams, Chelsea Miller, Deanna Dixon, Erik Brooks, Fallynn Rian, Herman Bryant, Jamal Moore, Javonte Pollard, Jonathan Coleman, Naarai Jacobs, and Porcha Clay.) – choir (6)
- Jason White – conductor (6)
- Caleb Curry – vocals (6)
- Danielle Withers – vocals (6)
- Jasmine Patton – vocals (6)
- Jorel Quinn – vocals (6)
- Kim Johnson – vocals (6)
- Kristen Lowe – vocals (6)
- Sabrina Claudio – background vocals (8)
- Patrick Paige II – bass (8)
- Derek Renfroe – guitar (8)
- Leven Kali – synthesizer (8), background vocals (9, 16)
- Annika Gesteedle-Diamant – background vocals (9)
- Ashlee Wingate – background vocals (9)
- Kye Young – background vocals (9)
- Laylani Gesteedle-Diamant – background vocals (9)
- Ari PenSmith – background vocals (10)
- Tatiana "Tatu" Matthews – background vocals (11)
- Calev – guitar (11)
- Cadenza – programming (11)
- Hit-Boy – programming (12)
- Lil Ju – programming (12)
- Jameil Aossey – drums (13)
- S1a0 – drums (13)
- BAH – programming (13)
- BloodPop – programming (13, 15), synthesizer (13)
- DIXSON – background vocals (15)
- Kenneth Whalum – saxophone (15)
- Lee Blaske – strings (15)
- Keyon Harrold – trumpet (15)
- Colin Leonard – mastering
- Stuart White – mixing, recording
- Andrea Roberts – engineering (all tracks), recording (11)
- John Cranfield – engineering
- Brandon Harding – recording (1, 2, 4–7)
- Chi Coney – recording (3–5, 11, 15, 16)
- Hotae Alexander Jang – recording (4, 15), engineering assistance (15)
- Russell Graham – recording (4)
- Steve Rusch – recording (4)
- Chris Mclaughlin – recording (6)
- Delroy "Phatta" Pottinger – recording (10)
- GuiltyBeatz – recording (10)
- Jabbar Stevens – recording (13)
- Matheus Braz – engineering assistance
- Mariel Gomerez – A&R
- Ricky Lawson – A&R/Project Manager

== Charts ==
=== Weekly charts ===
Weekly chart performance
Chart (2022)	Peak position
Australian Albums (ARIA)	1
Austrian Albums (Ö3 Austria)	2
Belgian Albums (Ultratop Flanders)	1
Belgian Albums (Ultratop Wallonia)	1
Canadian Albums (Billboard)	1
Czech Albums (ČNS IFPI)	4
Croatian International Albums (HDU)	3
Danish Albums (Hitlisten)	1
Dutch Albums (Album Top 100)	1
Finnish Albums (Suomen virallinen lista)	3
French Albums (SNEP)	1
German Albums (Offizielle Top 100)	2
Greek Albums (IFPI)	3
Hungarian Albums (MAHASZ)	13
Icelandic Albums (Tónlistinn)	2
Irish Albums (Official Charts)	1
Italian Albums (FIMI)	2
Japanese Albums (Oricon)	40
Japanese Hot Albums (Billboard Japan)	44
Lithuanian Albums (AGATA)	2
New Zealand Albums (RMNZ)	1
Norwegian Albums (VG-lista)	3
Polish Albums (ZPAV)	3
Portuguese Albums (AFP)	2
Scottish Albums (Official Charts)	1
Slovak Albums (ČNS IFPI)	4
Spanish Albums (Promusicae)	3
Swedish Albums (Sverigetopplistan)	1
Swiss Albums (Schweizer Hitparade)	3
Swiss Albums (Romandie)	1
UK Albums (Official Charts)	1
US Billboard 200	1
US Top Dance Albums (Billboard)	1
US Top R&B/Hip-Hop Albums (Billboard)	1

=== Year-end charts ===
Year-end chart performance
Chart (2022)	Position
Australian Albums (ARIA)	56
Belgian Albums (Ultratop Flanders)	25
Belgian Albums (Ultratop Wallonia)	72
Danish Albums (Hitlisten)	71
Dutch Albums (Album Top 100)	21
French Albums (SNEP)	79
Icelandic Albums (Tónlistinn)	95
Lithuanian Albums (AGATA)	44
New Zealand Albums (RMNZ)	43
Portuguese Albums (AFP)	48
Spanish Albums (PROMUSICAE)	63
Swiss Albums (Schweizer Hitparade)	35
UK Albums (Official Charts)	35
US Billboard 200	21
US Top R&B/Hip-Hop Albums (Billboard)	11

Year-end chart performance
Chart (2023)	Position
Australian Albums (ARIA)	98
Belgian Albums (Ultratop Flanders)	31
Belgian Albums (Ultratop Wallonia)	55
Canadian Albums (Billboard)	45
Danish Albums (Hitlisten)	98
Dutch Albums (Album Top 100)	20
French Albums (SNEP)	67
Icelandic Albums (Tónlistinn)	55
Spanish Albums (PROMUSICAE)	58
Swiss Albums (Schweizer Hitparade)	93
UK Albums (Official Charts)	39
US Billboard 200	22
US Top Dance/Electronic Albums (Billboard)	1
US Top R&B/Hip-Hop Albums (Billboard)	7

Year-end chart performance
Chart (2024)	Position
Belgian Albums (Ultratop Flanders)	149
French Albums (SNEP)	199
Portuguese Albums (AFP)	116
US Billboard 200	177
US Top Dance/Electronic Albums (Billboard)	3
US Top R&B/Hip-Hop Albums (Billboard)	69

Year-end chart performance
Chart (2025)	Position
US Top Dance Albums (Billboard)	6

== Certifications and sales ==
Certifications and sales
Region	Certification	Certified units/sales
Australia (ARIA)	Gold	35,000^{‡}
Belgium (BRMA)	Gold	10,000^{‡}
Brazil (Pro-Música Brasil)	Diamond	160,000^{‡}
Canada (Music Canada)	Platinum	80,000^{‡}
Denmark (IFPI Danmark)	Platinum	20,000^{‡}
France (SNEP)	Platinum	100,000^{‡}
Hungary (MAHASZ)	Gold	2,000^{‡}
Iceland (FHF)	—	1,156
Italy (FIMI)	Gold	25,000^{‡}
New Zealand (RMNZ)	Platinum	15,000^{‡}
Poland (ZPAV)	Platinum	20,000^{‡}
Spain (Promusicae)	Gold	20,000^{‡}
Sweden (GLF)	Platinum	30,000^{‡}
United Kingdom (BPI)	Platinum	300,000^{‡}
United States (RIAA)	2× Platinum	2,000,000^{‡}
^{‡} Sales+streaming figures based on certification alone.

== Release history ==
Release history
Initial release date	Edition	Format(s)	Ref.
July 29, 2022	Standard	Digital download; streaming; CD; vinyl LP	

== See also ==
- List of Billboard 200 number-one albums of 2022
- List of number-one albums of 2022 (Australia)
- List of number-one albums of 2022 (Belgium)
- List of number-one albums of 2022 (Canada)
- List of number-one albums from the 2020s (Denmark)
- List of number-one hits of 2022 (France)
- List of number-one albums of 2022 (Ireland)
- List of number-one albums from the 2020s (New Zealand)
- List of number-one albums of 2022 (Scotland)
- List of number-one singles and albums in Sweden
- List of UK Albums Chart number ones of the 2020s

== Sources ==
- Baade, Christina; McGee, Kristin A. (2021). Beyoncé in the World. Wesleyan University Press. ISBN 978-0-8195-7993-5.
- Brooks, Kinitra D.; Jones, Nicholas R. (2025). The Renaissance Reader (in French). Taylor & Francis. ISBN 978-1-04-045393-3.
- Kakar, Shalini (2023). Devotional Fanscapes. Bloomsbury Publishing. ISBN 978-1-7936-4628-6.
- Lordi, Emily J. (2017). "Surviving the Hustle: Beyoncé's Performance of Work". Black Camera. 9 (1). doi:10.2979/blackcamera.9.1.08.
- Zaleski, Annie (2025). Beyoncé: The Stories Behind the Songs. Headline Publishing Group. ISBN 978-1-0354-2657-7.
