= Whitehaven, Memphis =

Neighborhood within Memphis, Tennessee

- Location within Tennessee Location in the United States
- Coordinates: 35°01′38″N 90°01′45″W
- Country State County: United States; Tennessee; Shelby
- Settled: 1851

Area
  - Total: 18.0 sq mi (47 km^{2})
- Elevation: 295 ft (90 m)

Population (2000)
  - Total: 50,000
  - Density: 857.9/sq mi (331.2/km^{2})
- approx.
- Time zone: UTC−6 (CST)
  - Summer (DST): UTC−5 (CDT)
- ZIP Code: 38109, 38116
- Area code: 901
- GNIS feature ID: 1304540
- Website: Official Website

Whitehaven, informally known as "Blackhaven", is a predominantly African-American community in Memphis, Tennessee, United States. It was first organized in the late 19th century as a neighborhood for upper-class white families. Its current population is about 50,000.

== History ==
The community takes its name from Colonel Francis Marion White (1810–1887), an early settler, slaver, railroad executive and major property owner. White was influential in getting a rail line to run through what was first called White's Station, later Whitehaven. He profited handsomely from enabling cotton plantations in the Mississippi Delta to ship their product to Memphis, where it was loaded onto steamboats and transported to New Orleans. At Friendship Cemetery, near Como, Mississippi, White's headstone reads: "This monument is erected by the Mississippi & Tennessee Railroad Company in commemoration of his honest, faithful, and intelligent management of the affairs as chief officer for thirty-five years."

In 1852 White was appointed by the State Legislature as commissioner to assist in organizing the Mississippi & Tennessee Railroad Company. The following year he was elected president, a position held for two decades and again from 1882 through 1885); he was vice president (1873–75); director (1859–75 and 1882–85).

White spent time in Memphis at the Gayoso Hotel. "He died there and his body was taken by train to Como where his Negro slaves met it and carried it to the cemetery. This was quite an ordeal for he weighed three hundred pounds! He was influential in bringing the railroad through Whitehaven. He had large holdings along what is now Whitehaven Lane and owned the land on which the school now stands." Born in Jones County, Georgia, White descends from John White, the emigrant of Leicestershire who settled near Ruckersville, Virginia in Orange County. F. M. White, the second surviving son of Thomas White and Elizabeth Haynes Clark, was widowed twice, married three times and fathered five children—a beloved son was killed at the Battle of Shiloh. Francis died at age 77 in 1887. He owned more than 200 enslaved people.

The railroad at Whitehaven was chartered in 1853, and the first trains ran in 1856. The first "White Haven" post office was opened in 1871.

Some of the other founding family names in the region include Raines, Hale, McCorkle, and Harbin. E. W. Hale moved to the area in the 1880s and opened a store near what is now Whitehaven High School on Elvis Presley Blvd. Hale's Store was a landmark for many decades.

In 1926, WREC radio began operations there, and in 1928 Whitehaven Hoyt B. Wooten was one of the first six television licensees in America. His original home is the centerpiece of a private development called Lion's Gate.

Much of the later residential and commercial development was done by Carrington Jones and Lacy Mosby in the mid 20th century, to provide housing for "baby boom" families who moved from Memphis to a pleasant environment in the old community. This gradually transformed plantation tracts to neighborhoods in the late 1940s and 1950s.

Formerly a farm community, Whitehaven was developed as a residential suburban area of Memphis in the 1950s and early 1960s. In 1950, Whitehaven had a population of 1,311. In 1960, Whitehaven had a population of 13,894.

On January 1, 1970, Whitehaven was forcefully annexed by the City of Memphis. Prior to this annexation, the residents of the area did not want to be a part of Memphis. Several years later after Whitehaven became the city's territory, the majority of the White families of the area left and moved to the outer-Memphis suburbs. This led to Whitehaven becoming a majority predominantly African American community. It was integrated in the late 1960s and white flight ensued over the next two decades. Whitehaven is now a part of South Memphis.

== Geography ==
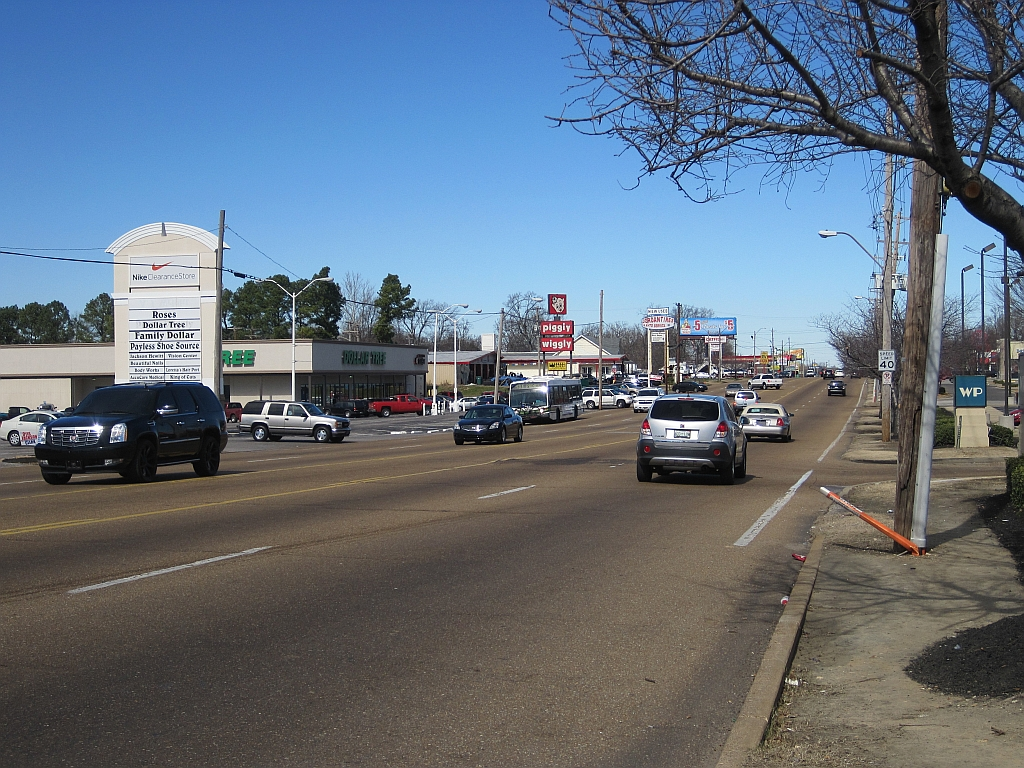
Elvis Presley Boulevard

Whitehaven is a neighborhood in South Memphis and is roughly bounded by Brooks Road on the north and the Mississippi state line on the south, with the Illinois Central Railroad on the west and Airways Boulevard on the east.

The major traffic artery of the community is U.S. Route 51, later known as Elvis Presley Boulevard. This roadway began as a toll "Plank Road" built between Memphis and Hernando, Mississippi in 1852.

== Arts and culture ==
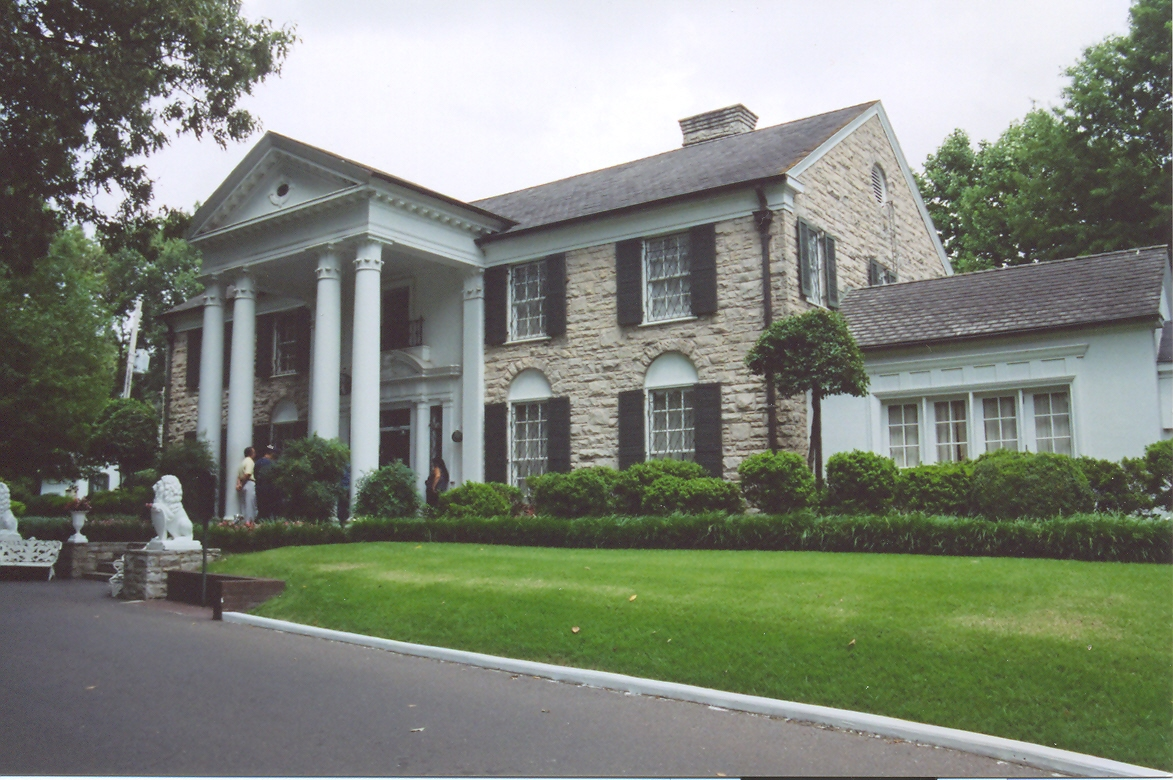
Graceland Mansion

Whitehaven's major tourist attractions are still Graceland mansion and the annual Elvis Week, attracting many thousands there annually to remember "The King" on the anniversary of his death on August 16, 1977. Elvis Presley bought his famous home in 1957; soon afterward the farmland surrounding the estate was subdivided into homesites. During the two decades he lived in Whitehaven, Elvis spent as much time as possible at his home and was a beloved neighbor to residents there.

=== Southland Mall ===
Southland Mall opened at the corner of Shelby Drive and Highway 51 South in 1966 (officially becoming Elvis Presley Blvd on January 19, 1972), and is still a destination for shoppers from all over the region. It greatly helped the community to prosper. Southland Mall was the first enclosed mall in Memphis.

== Parks and recreation ==
David Carnes Park is named for the early African-American landowner and blacksmith David Carnes, whose property is now the site of the park. David Carnes Park underwent a $5.4 million renovation in August 2019. The park includes a splash pad, playground, walking paths, fitness equipment, obstacle course, turfed multipurpose field, and multiple pavilions.

== Education ==
Five high schools are in the Whitehaven area: Fairley High School, Hillcrest High School, Pathways In Education, Whitehaven High School and Freedom Preparatory Academy High School. Whitehaven High School was opened by 1911 with evidence of the school dating back to 1893 and was the only high school in the community until Hillcrest opened during the 1960s. A strong rivalry developed between the two schools, and the Hillcrest/Whitehaven game became one of the major events in the community during football season. Bishop Byrne, a private co-educational Catholic high school adjacent to Saint Paul Church on Shelby Drive, opened in 1966 and closed in 2013.

=== Schools ===
- Whitehaven High School
- Hillcrest High School (Green Dot Charter system affiliate)
- Havenview Middle School
- A. Maceo Walker Middle School
- Whitehaven Elementary School
- Gardenview Elementary School
- Robert R Church Elementary School
- Oakshire Elementary School
- Holmes Road Elementary School
- Pathways In Education (7–12)
- Fairley High School (Green Dot Charter system affiliate)
- John P. Freeman Optional School (K–8)
- Freedom Preparatory Academy Elementary School
- Freedom Preparatory Academy Middle School
- Freedom Preparatory Academy High School

=== Private schools in 38116 (Whitehaven) ===
- Bishop Byrne Middle and High School (closed)
- St. Paul Catholic School (PK–8th grades)
- City University Preparatory Schools and Liberal Arts
- Du Bois School of Arts & Technology (closed)
- Memphis Preparatory School (closed)

== Notable people ==
- DJ Paul
- Tommy Wright III
- Princess Loko
- Gangsta Boo
- K. Michelle
- Drumma Boy
- Gangsta Pat
- Dontari Poe
- Elvis Presley
- Duke Deuce
- La Chat
- Lou Williams
- Derrick Byars
