= Matheus Braz =

Brazilian sound engineer, mixing engineer

- Born: Rio de Janeiro, Brazil
- Musical career
- Genres: R&B; soul; hip-hop; pop
- Occupations: Mixing engineer; sound recording; sound engineer
- Website: www.matheusbraz.com

Matheus Braz is a Brazilian sound recording and mixing engineer best known for his contributions to Beyoncé's studio albums Renaissance and Cowboy Carter, winning a Grammy Award for the latter from two overall nominations.

== Introduction into the music industry ==
Braz immigrated to the US from Brazil and began his career working as a sound technician on cruise ships. After some time, he returned to college to study recording and, after graduating, moved to New York during the pandemic. Braz was soon hired by the QUAD Recording Studios as an intern. In an interview with Forbes Brazil about his early development in the music industry, he described his early days working at QUAD involving “clean[ing] a lot of bathrooms, floors and cigarette ash from the soundboards... [, but] in the meantime, I used all my free time to learn how to use the equipment and improve as an engineer.”

After a few months in the position, he landed an assistant engineer position and decided to move to Los Angeles with his wife, after the owner of QUAD Studios put him into contact with Stuart White (Beyoncé's lead recording engineer), a good friend of the studio owner who needed a sound engineer assistant at the time.

== Selected credits ==
Title	Year	Artist
"Be Alive" (with DIXSON)	2021	Beyoncé
Renaissance	2022	Beyoncé
"America Has a Problem Remix" (Featuring Kendrick Lamar)	2023	Beyoncé
"Cuff It (Wetter)"	2023	Beyoncé
"My House"	2023	Beyoncé
Formentera II	2023	Metric
Cowboy Carter	2024	Beyoncé
"Texas Hold 'Em (Pony Up Remix)"	2024	Beyoncé
Bando Stone & the New World	2024	Childish Gambino
"Outside"	2025	Enhypen
B'Day: 20th Anniversary Edition	2026	Beyoncé

== Awards and nominations ==
Year	Ceremony	Award	Result	Ref
2023	65th Annual Grammy Awards	Grammy Award for Album of the Year (Renaissance)	Nominated	
2025	67th Annual Grammy Awards	Grammy Award for Album of the Year (Cowboy Carter)	Won	

== See also ==
- List of Brazilian Grammy Award winners and nominees
