= Kelman Duran =

Dominican producer, songwriter, composer, disk jockey, visual artist

- Born: 1984 (age 41–42); La Ermita, Espaillat Province, Dominican Republic
- Education: Binghamton University; CalArts
- Musical career
- Origin: New York City, NY, United States
- Genres: Dancehall; reggaeton; electronic music; hip hop; dembow
- Occupations: Producer; songwriter; composer; disc jockey; visual artist
- Label: SCORPIO RED

Kelman Duran is a Dominican songwriter, producer, composer, disc jockey and multi-disciplinary artist, best known for his production and songwriting contributions to opening track "I'm That Girl" and "Heated" from Beyoncé's 2022 album Renaissance, as well as his scoring work on 2022 film Rodeo.

== Early life ==
Duran grew up in the Dominican Republic before moving to the Washington Heights neighborhood of New York City in 1989, residing there from the ages of 5 to 19.

== Career ==
=== 2017–2023: Debut projects, film scoring, and Renaissance ===
After attending CalArts, Duran moved to Los Angeles, where he became a fixture in RAIL UP, a series of recurring dance parties in the underground Afro-Caribbean night scene. In 2017, Duran released debut project 1804 Kids, which is a reference to the Haitian Revolution and "dedicated to Afro-Caribbean sounds." Duran was recognized as "an artist you need to know" by music publication Rolling Stone in January 2019, before releasing his second full-length project 13th Month, inspired by the Sioux calendar as well as time Duran spent on the Pine Ridge Reservation amid the Lakota Tribe making a long-form video piece To The North P.I & P.II about the lives of the Native Americans on the reservations. Pitchfork described the album as a juxtaposition between "the social plagues still haunting us" and a dance-floor "release". Duran released his third full-length project Night In Tijuana in 2021, inspired by his migration to the United States in the 1980s, and is described as traversing "spiritual jazz, electronic, and ambient [sounds]". Duran scored French film Rodeo, curating the soundtrack during COVID-19 pandemic lockdowns in Berlin. He searched for music that elevated director Lola Quivoron's "portrait of suburban angst". The Los Angeles Times described his work in the film as an "adrenalized soundscape".

== Discography ==
=== Studio albums ===
- 1804 Kids (2017)
- 13th Month (2019)
- Night In Tijuana (2021)
- Scorpio falling (2025)
- SUUNS & Kelman Duran (2026)

=== Songwriting and production credits ===
Credits are courtesy of Spotify and Tidal.

Title	Year	Artist	Album
"Phylum" (Kelman Duran Remix)	2019	Tristan Arp	Suggested Forms
"I'm That Girl"	2022	Beyoncé	Renaissance
"HEATED"	2022	Beyoncé	Renaissance
"Bacardi Papi" (with UTILITY)	2023	Vv Pete	Non-album single

== Filmography ==
=== Film ===
Year	Title	Role	Notes	Ref.
2015	I Am Gangster	Score	Composer	
2016	To The North	Director, Producer, Writer	Filmed at Pine Ridge Indian Reservation in Pine Ridge, South Dakota	
2022	Rodeo	Score	Composer/Curated Soundtrack - film debuted at Cannes Film Festival	

== Awards and nominations ==
Year	Ceremony	Award	Result	Ref
2023	65th Annual Grammy Awards	Album of the Year (Renaissance)	Nominated	
2023	65th Annual Grammy Awards	Grammy Award for Best Dance/Electronic Album (Renaissance) ^{A}	Won	

=== Notes ===
A. ^{A} Winning producers in this category with less than a 50% album contribution are awarded with a Winner's Certificate.
