= Tommy Wright III =

American rapper and producer (born 1976)

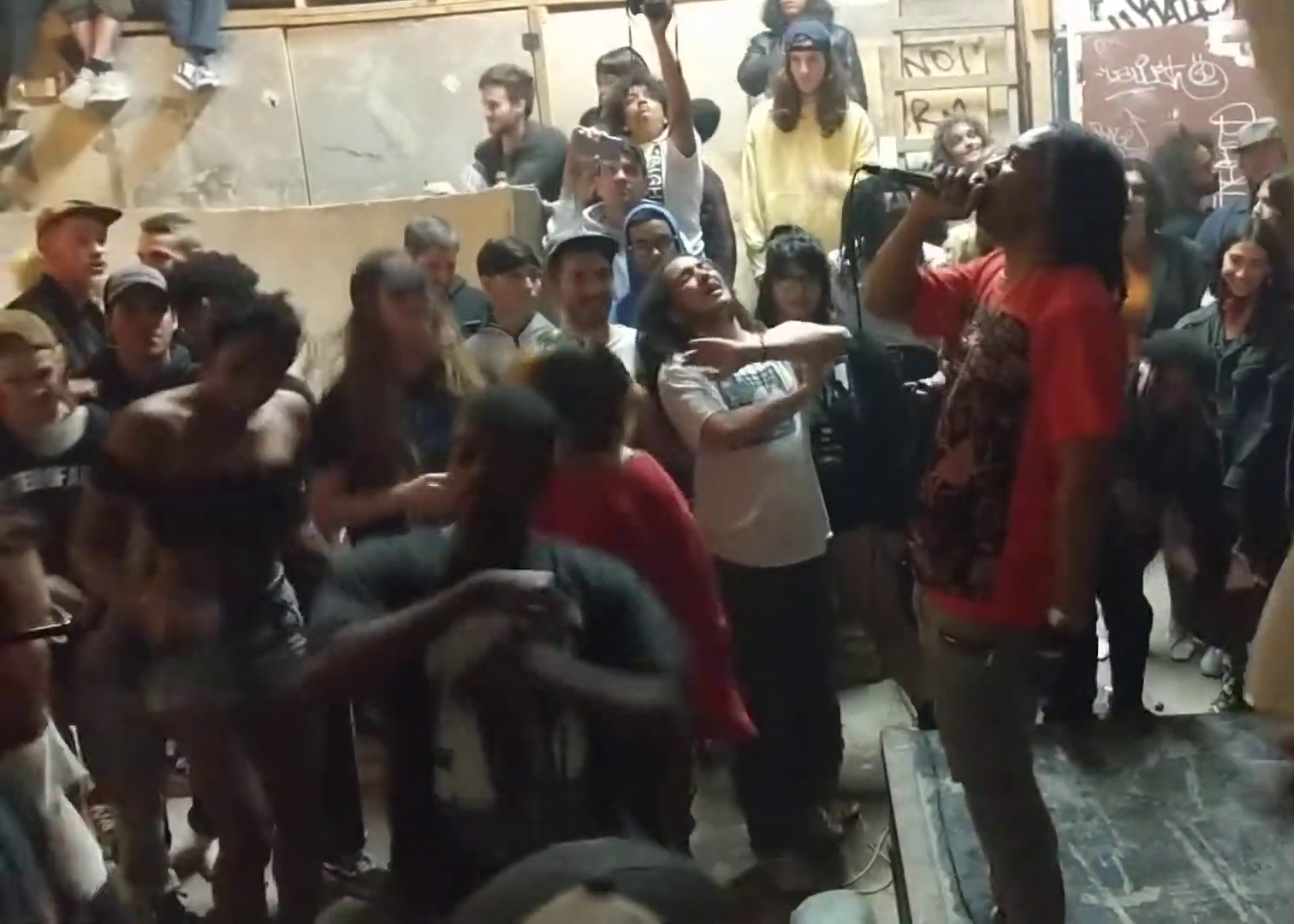
- Tommy Wright III live in Austin, Texas, in 2019

Background information
- Also known as: 1 Man Gang
- Born: May 6, 1976 (age 50)
- Origin: Whitehaven, Memphis, Tennessee, U.S.
- Genres: Southern hip-hop; Memphis rap; trap; gangsta rap; horrorcore
- Occupations: Rapper, producer
- Years active: 1992–present
- Label: Street Smart Records

Tommy Wright III (born May 6, 1976) is an American rapper and hip hop producer. He began rapping in Memphis during the 1990s and is considered to be an early pioneer for fast-paced rap and trap production in South Memphis.

== Biography ==
=== Background ===
Tommy Wright III was born on May 6, 1976, into a family of deaf people. He is an only child. His mother, Erma Lewis-Ivie, worked as a postal worker, and his father, Tommy Wright Jr., was employed at a factory that manufactures metal and plastic products. According to Tommy Wright III, his parents were members of a Baptist church for the deaf, where they sang in a choir that performed songs in sign language. During his childhood, he developed a passion for music. He played the trombone, tuba, and baritone saxophone. According to him, in the mid-to-late 1980s, his neighbor, the DJ Disco Hound, introduced him to the nightclubs of Memphis, where he discovered hip-hop. At age 15, he was living in public housing in the Riverside neighborhood of Memphis. He later moved to the Whitehaven neighborhood, where he met the future members of his band, Ten Wanted Men.

=== Musical career ===
Growing up in Memphis, Wright began producing music using four-track recording equipment. He recorded his debut album, Still Not Quite Human, in 1990. Between 1992 and 2001, he released five self-produced solo albums, one with N.O.D., and two more with group Ten Wanted Men. Wright owned, operated and produced the entirety of Street Smart Record's discography and previewed – if possibly never distributed – a street documentary, Behind Closed Doors, for which a soundtrack was also created. Despite the influence he had on the Memphis rap scene at the time, he remained underground.

In 1996, he met Playa Fly, a former rapper with the group Three 6 Mafia who had just fallen out with his group. They began collaborating and became friends. That same year, he signed with the Select-O-Hits label. He then rented an office space for his own label, Street Smart Records, which also included a recording studio, but he eventually couldn't afford the rent. He then embarked on a legal battle to keep the Street Smart Records recording studio, which he lost. Without his office space or studio, he returned to a life of crime and spent four years in and out of prison. He was released in 2005.

Wright is acclaimed as one of the earliest figures of the Memphis rap sound, paving the way for the signature sound that groups like Three 6 Mafia later popularized.

=== Resurgence ===
Between 2009 and 2010, he regained the rights to his albums and returned to South Memphis, where he devoted himself primarily to his family life and stepped back from the music industry. With the rise of music sharing on the internet, his music gained a cult following, a fact he was unaware of until 2011, when DJ Diplo called him to play a concert in Philadelphia, his first outside the southern United States. Now aware of his newfound popularity online, he began selling his music on eBay and started using social media. During this period, he began to gain a following among punk and skateboarding audiences, as well as in Europe. He no longer releases new albums but continues to perform live.

Rappers such as Kreayshawn, Lil B, Lil Ugly Mane, ASAP Rocky, and Denzel Curry cited him as an inspiration, and he has had a major influence on the SoundCloud rap scene. Tommy Wright III was sampled in ASAP Rocky's song "OG Beeper," in Russian rapper Big Baby Tape's song "Hard 2 Kill," and in Beyoncé's song "I'm That Girl".

== Discography ==
=== Albums ===
- Memphis Massacre (cassette, mini album, mixed), 1992
- Ashes 2 Ashes, Dust 2 Dust, 1994
- Runnin-N-Gunnin (cassette, album), 1995
- Tommy Wright & Ten Wanted Men – Wanted Dead or Alive (cassette, album), 1995
- On the Run, 1996
- Tommy Wright & Ten Wanted Men – 10 Toes Down (cassette, album), 1997
- Feel Me Before They Kill Me, 1998
- NASHVILLE TAKEOVER (cassette, album), 2016

==== Compilations ====
- Greatest Hits (cassette, compilation), 1997
- Genesis (Greatest Underground Hits), 2000
- Behind Closed Doors (Da Soundtrack), 2001
