= Stuart White (sound engineer) =

- Born: Stuart White; North Carolina
- Occupations: Mixing engineer; Recording engineer

Stuart White is a recording and mix engineer. He is best known for his work with Beyoncé, namely on studio albums Beyoncé, Lemonade, Renaissance, and Cowboy Carter. White has won five Grammy Awards from 12 nominations.

== Early life and career development ==
White was born around the year 1980, hailing from North Carolina. From ten years old, he started experimenting with tape decks, karaoke machines, and samplers. He graduated from Full Sail University in 2002, and moved to New York, where he was hired by Quad Studios, staying there for around six years. During this period, White worked alongside and was mentored by highly-regarded engineers Russell Elevado and Ann Mincieli, and was hired as the personal engineer of Alicia Keys’ producer Kerry ‘Krucial’ Brothers.

In 2010, he took the position of main house engineer at Mincieli’s newly-opened Jungle City Studios in New York. Two years later, Mincieli informed him that Beyoncé was looking for an engineer, and when the call came, White “couldn’t turn it down.” He was quickly thrown in the deep end with the recordings for Beyoncé, and confronted with production methods that were both on an industrial scale and highly experimental. White has subsequently appeared on all of her releases since the release of Beyoncé in December 2013.

Since becoming the full-time engineer of Beyoncé, the majority of his work has since been on her projects; however, his credit list also includes notable names like Sia, Nicki Minaj, FKA Twigs, Jay-Z, Boots, Solange, Nas, Childish Gambino, Mary J. Blige and Megan Thee Stallion.
