= Fredhead =

Studio album by Right Said Fred
- Released: 23 October 2001
- Recorded: 2000–2001
- Genres: Dance, pop rock
- Label: BMG
- Producer: Alex Christensen

Right Said Fred chronology
Smashing! (1996)	Fredhead (2001)	Stand Up (2002)

Singles from Fredhead
- 1. "Mojive" Released: 2 July 2001; 2. "You're My Mate" Released: 14 August 2001; 3. "Love Song" Released: 8 January 2001

Fredhead is the fourth album by British pop group Right Said Fred. It peaked at #2 on the German Albums Chart. The album yielded three singles: "Mojive", the single in the UK Top 20 "You're My Mate", and "Love Song".

Professional ratings
Review scores
Source	Rating
Allmusic	4.5/5 stars

== Track listing ==
1. "You're My Mate"
2. "Mojive"
3. "Angel Dust"
4. "Funk You"
5. "I Know What Love Is"
6. "Lap Dance Junkie"
7. "Lovers.com"
8. "Bring Your Smile"
9. "Like a Woman"
10. "Jamaica Jerk"
11. "The Sun Changes Everything"
12. "Insatiable You"
13. "Love Song"
14. "Mojive (AC-Koma / Blue PM video mix)"
15. "I'm Too Sexy"
16. "Don't Talk Just Kiss"

== Charts ==
=== Weekly charts ===
Chart (2001)	Peak position
Austrian Albums (Ö3 Austria)	4
German Albums (Offizielle Top 100)	2
Swiss Albums (Schweizer Hitparade)	75

=== Year-end charts ===
Chart (2002)	Position
German Albums (Offizielle Top 100)	93
