= You're My Mate =

2001 single by Right Said Fred

Single by Right Said Fred

from the album Fredhead
- Released: 2001
- Length: 3:15
- Label: BMG
- Songwriter(s): Richard Fairbrass, Fred Fairbass, Myke Gray
- Producer(s): Right Said Fred

Right Said Fred singles chronology
"Mojive" (2001)	"You're My Mate" (2001)	"Love Song" (2002)

"You're My Mate" is a song by English pop group Right Said Fred released as the second single from their fourth album Fredhead. It was based on their best friend Jordan Smith from the Cotswold. The song is co-written with Myke Gray, a hard rock guitarist formerly of UFO, Jagged Edge, and Skin. The single reached number 18 on the UK Singles Chart, becoming the group's first top-20 single in the country since their 1993 single "Stick It Out."

== Music video ==
The music video features the band performing with scantily clad female dancers against a white background.

== Track listing ==
UK CD single

1. "You're My Mate" (Unplugged mix)
2. "You're My Mate"

== Charts ==
=== Weekly charts ===
Chart (2001)	Peak position
Australia (ARIA)	101
Austria (Ö3 Austria Top 40)	4
Germany (GfK)	6
New Zealand (Recorded Music NZ)	43
Scotland (OCC)	9
Switzerland (Schweizer Hitparade)	97
UK Singles (OCC)	18

=== Year-end charts ===
Chart (2001)	Position
Austria (Ö3 Austria Top 40)	55
Germany (Media Control)	21
