= Jagged Edge =

Jagged Edge may refer to:

== Film and TV ==
- Jagged Edge (film), a 1985 film starring Glenn Close, Jeff Bridges, Robert Loggia and Peter Coyote

== Music ==
=== Groups ===
- Jagged Edge (American group), an American R&B singing group
- Jagged Edge (British band), a British rock group whose members went on to form the band Skin.

=== Albums ===
- Jagged Edge (Gary Numan album), 2008
- Jagged Edge (Jagged Edge album), 2006 album by the American group

== See also ==
- Jaggies, the informal name for aliasing artifacts in raster images
- Hired Guns: The Jagged Edge, a video game
