= Those Simple Things/Daydream =

"Those Simple Things" / "Daydream"

Single by Right Said Fred

from the album Up
- Released: 20 July 1992
- Recorded: 1991
- Genre: Dance-pop
- Length: 5:08 ("Those Simple Things"); 3:38 ("Daydream")
- Label: Tug
- Songwriters: Richard Fairbrass; Fred Fairbrass; Rob Manzoli
- Producers: Tommy D ("Those Simple Things"); Walter Turbitt ("Daydream")

Right Said Fred singles chronology
"Deeply Dippy" (1992)	"Those Simple Things" / "Daydream" (1992)	"Stick It Out" (1993)

"Those Simple Things" and "Daydream" (sometimes subtitled "What a Day for a") are songs by English pop group Right Said Fred, released in July 1992 by Tug Records as a double a-side single, and the fourth and final single from their debut album, Up (1992). "Daydream" is a cover version of the song of the same name by The Lovin' Spoonful.

== Track listings ==
- United Kingdom CD (CD SNOG 4)
1. "Those Simple Things" (7" edit) – 3:28
2. "Daydream" – 3:41
3. "Those Simple Things" (12" mix) – 6:19
4. "I'm Too Sexy (Trexmix)" – 5:26
- United Kingdom 12" (12 SNOG 4)
1. "Those Simple Things" (12" version)
2. "Daydream"
3. "Those Simple Things" (7" edit)
4. "I'm Too Sexy (Trexmix)"
- United Kingdom 7" (SNOG 4)
1. "Those Simple Things"
2. "Daydream"

== Charts ==
Chart (1992)	Peak position
Australia (ARIA)	121
Austria (Ö3 Austria Top 40)	29
Belgium (Ultratop 50 Flanders)	27
Germany (GfK)	48
Ireland (IRMA)	21
Netherlands (Dutch Top 40)	20
Switzerland (Schweizer Hitparade)	18
UK Singles (OCC)	29
UK Airplay (Music Week) "Those Simple Things"	33
UK Airplay (Music Week) "Daydream"	27
