= Wonderman (Right Said Fred song) =

1994 single by Right Said Fred

Single by Right Said Fred

from the album Sex and Travel
- Released: 7 March 1994
- Recorded: 1993
- Genre: Dance
- Label: EMI
- Songwriters: Richard Fairbrass; Fred Fairbrass; Rob Manzoli
- Producer: Right Said Fred

Right Said Fred singles chronology
| "Hands Up (4 Lovers)" (1993) | "Wonderman" (1994) | "Mojive" (2001) |

"Wonderman" is a pop song by English band Right Said Fred. It was released in March 1994 by EMI as the third and final single from their second studio album, Sex and Travel (1993).

== Release ==
The single differs significantly from the album version, having been re-worked for use by Sega Europe to promote the release of Sonic the Hedgehog 3. Its lyrics and accompanying music video contain numerous explicit references to the video game, ending with a woman commenting, "He's just a flippin' hedgehog, okay?" Actor Steven O'Donnell, at that time the advertising face of Sega Europe, also features prominently in the music video.

== Chart performance ==
Wonderman reached number 55 on the UK Singles Chart.

== Critical reception ==
Alan Jones from Music Week gave the song two out of five, saying, "Looking to regain some of the ground they have lost recently, Right Said Fred have come up with a rather cheap-sounding and gimmicky song. This doesn't sound like the way back for the boys, although the much-publicised tie-in with Sonic 3 will generate some interest from games buyers." Pan-European magazine Music & Media wrote, "Muscled like a Roman gladiator, Richard Fairbrass always has the strongest punch line of 'em all. DJs who like to crack a joke should play this far funnier single."

== Track listing ==
- UK CD single
1. "Wonderman" (7" version)
2. "Wonderman" (12" edit)
3. "Wonderman" (Acapella)
4. "Wonderman" (12" backing track, unedited)
5. "Wonderman" (7" alternative lead vocal)

== Charts ==
| Chart (1994) | Peak position |
|---|---|
| Belgium (Ultratop 50 Flanders) | 50 |
| UK Singles (Official Charts) | 55 |
