= Hands Up (4 Lovers) =

Single by Right Said Fred

from the album Sex and Travel
- Released: 1993
- Recorded: 1993
- Genre: Dance
- Label: EMI
- Songwriter(s): Richard Fairbrass; Fred Fairbrass; Rob Manzoli
- Producer(s): Right Said Fred

Right Said Fred singles chronology
"Bumped" (1993)	"Hands Up (4 Lovers)" (1993)	"Wonderman" (1994)

"Hands Up (4 Lovers)" (album version titled "Hands Up for Lovers") is a song by English pop group Right Said Fred, which was released in 1993 by EMI as the second single off their second album, Sex and Travel (1993).

== Track listing ==
- United Kingdom CD single
1. "Hands Up (4 Lovers)" (7" Mix)
2. "Hands Up (4 Lovers)" (The Morning Mix)
3. "Hands Up (4 Lovers)" (The Radio/Club Mix)
4. "Bingo"

== Charts ==
Chart (1993)	Peak position
Australia (ARIA)	176
Germany (GfK)	82
UK Singles (OCC)	60
UK Airplay (ERA)	45
