= Stop the World =

Stop the World may refer to:

== Music ==
=== Albums ===
- Stop the World (Aranda album) or the title song, 2012
- Stop the World (Riddlin' Kids album) or the title song, 2004
- Stop the World (Right Said Fred album) or the title song, 2011
- Stop the World, by Ghost Dance, 1989

=== Songs ===
- "Stop the World" (The Big Pink song), 2009
- "Stop the World" (Extreme song), 1992
- "Stop the World" (The Screaming Jets song), 1991
- "Stop the World (and Let Me Off)", by Carl Belew, 1957; covered by several performers
- "Stop the World", by the Clash from Super Black Market Clash, 1993
- "Stop the World", by Demi Lovato frm Here We Go Again, 2009
- "Stop the World", by Goo Goo Dolls from Superstar Car Wash, 1993
- "Stop the World", by Krokus from To Rock or Not to Be, 1995

== Other uses ==
- Stop-the-world, a kind of garbage collector in computer science

== See also ==
- Stop the World – I Want to Get Off (disambiguation)
