= Bumped (song) =

Single by Right Said Fred

from the album Sex and Travel
- Released: October 1993
- Recorded: 1993
- Genre: Dance
- Label: EMI
- Songwriters: Richard Fairbrass; Fred Fairbrass; Rob Manzoli
- Producer: Right Said Fred

Right Said Fred singles chronology
"Stick It Out" (1993)	"Bumped" (1993)	"Hands Up (4 Lovers)" (1993)

Music video
- "Bumped" on YouTube

"Bumped" is a song by English pop group Right Said Fred, released in October 1993, by EMI Records, as the first single off their album, Sex and Travel (1993). The song, both written and produced by the group, was notable for its commercial underperformance considering the group's previous success; in August 2001, ex-manager Guy Holmes noted on the BBC retrospective documentary I Love 1991 that over £100,000 was spent on the Wayne Isham-directed music video to make up for the fact that "the record wasn't really very good".

== Critical reception ==
Alan Jones from Music Week gave "Bumped" a score of four out of five and named it Pick of the Week, writing, "This is a vaguely oriental mid-tempo piece with a pleasing chorus and some chiming synth strings. The 12-inch features credible Joey Negro dance mixes, which look like giving the Freds their biggest Club Chart success. This combination of factors should ensure their winning streak continues."

== Track listing ==
- UK CD single
1. "Bumped" (Radio version)
2. "Bumped" (Aschun Mix)
3. "Bumped" (City Mix)
4. "Turn Me On" (Re-Wrap version)

== Charts ==
Chart performance for "Bumped"
Chart (1993)	Peak position
Australia (ARIA)	88
Belgium (Ultratop 50 Flanders)	25
Europe (Eurochart Hot 100)	88
Europe (European Hit Radio)	17
Germany (GfK)	54
Netherlands (Single Top 100)	37
New Zealand (Recorded Music NZ)	29
UK Singles (OCC)	32
UK Airplay (Music Week)	7
UK Club Chart (Music Week)	8
