= Stick It Out =

Stick It Out may refer to:

- Stick It Out (Rush song)
- Stick It Out (Right Said Fred song)
- Stick It Out (Frank Zappa song)
