= Up (Right Said Fred album) =

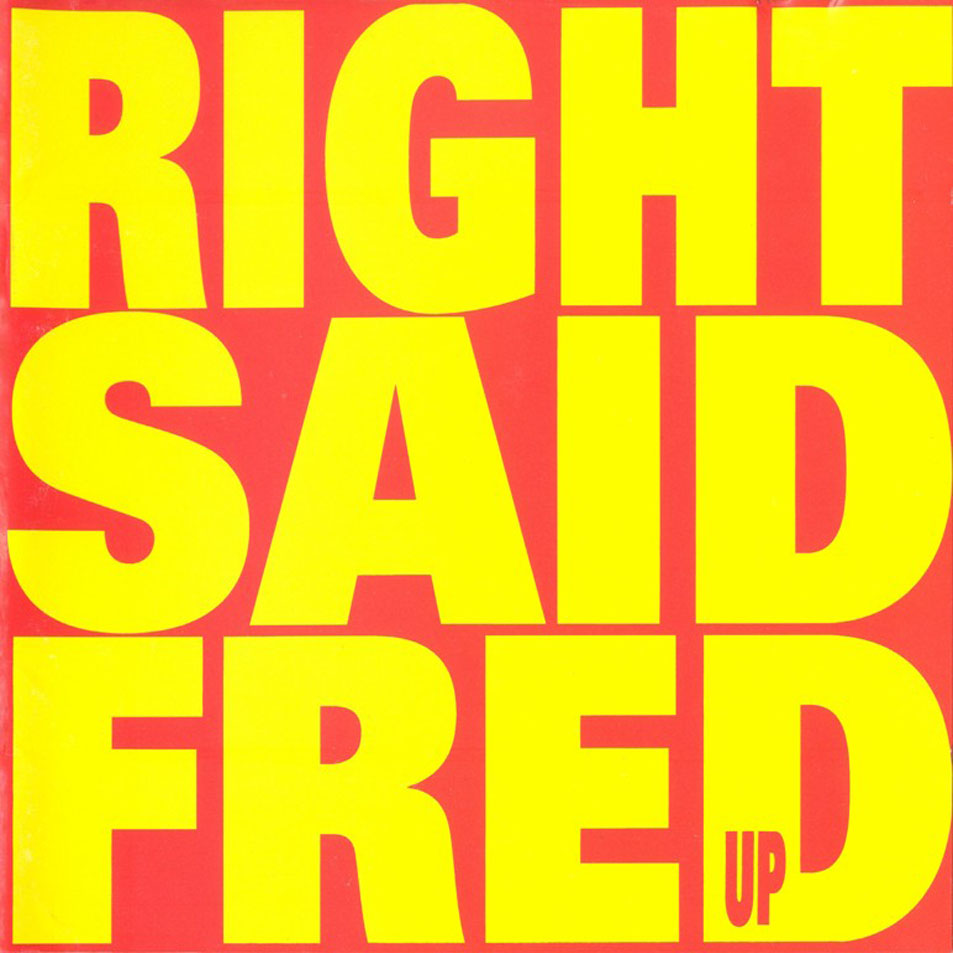

Studio album by Right Said Fred
- Released: 16 March 1992
- Recorded: 1991–1992
- Genres: Dance-pop, disco
- Length: 40:10
- Labels: Tug (UK); Charisma (US)
- Producer: TommyD

Right Said Fred chronology
Up (1992)	Sex and Travel (1993)

Singles from Up
- 1. "I'm Too Sexy" Released: July 1991; 2. "Don't Talk Just Kiss" Released: November 1991; 3. "Deeply Dippy" Released: March 1992; 4. "Those Simple Things" / "Daydream" Released: July 1992

Up is the debut album by English pop group Right Said Fred, released in 1992 on Charisma Records and Tug Recordings. It contains the UK number-one hit "Deeply Dippy", which reigned for three weeks from April to May 1992, and the US number-one "I'm Too Sexy", which topped the charts for three weeks in February 1992.

Up is Right Said Fred's sole UK-number one album and was also their only US album release, where it peaked at number 46 on the Billboard 200.

== Critical reception ==
Professional ratings
Review scores
Source	Rating
AllMusic	3.5/5 stars
The Encyclopedia of Popular Music	3/5 stars
Entertainment Weekly	B−
NME	8/10
Rolling Stone	2/5 stars
Smash Hits	5/5
USA Today	3/4 stars

In addition to "I'm Too Sexy", Arion Berger from Entertainment Weekly stated that the Up album has "relentless hooks, more goofy catchphrases, and camp sensibility coming out of its ears." He highlighted ”No One on Earth”, ”Do Ya Feel” and ”Deeply Dippy”, adding, "If Martians tried to approximate Earth music by channeling frivolous Top 40 like ABBA’s, overwrought cabaret like Liza Minnelli’s, and smart disco like the Pet Shop Boys’, the result might sound like Up. How all this would go over on Mars is hard to say; down here, it’s good-bad disposable pop." USA Today called the album "a collection of bubbly electronic disco."

== Track listing ==
All tracks are written by Richard Fairbrass, Fred Fairbrass and Rob Manzoli.

Original 1992 release
No.	Title	Length
1.	"Love for All Seasons"	4:16
2.	"No One on Earth"	3:23
3.	"I'm Too Sexy"	2:52
4.	"Do Ya Feel"	4:34
5.	"Is It True About Love?"	4:57
6.	"Deeply Dippy"	3:21
7.	"Swan"	3:10
8.	"Don't Talk Just Kiss"	4:01
9.	"Upon My Heart"	4:19
10.	"Those Simple Things"	5:08
Total length:		40:10

2007 bonus tracks
No.	Title	Length
11.	"I'm Too Sexy" (Extended Club Mix)
12.	"I'm Too Sexy 2007" (Tastemakers 12" Mix)
13.	"Deeply Dippy" (Deeply Brassy Mix)
14.	"Bumped" (Acshun Remix)
15.	"Hands Up for Lovers" (The Morning Mix)
16.	"What a Day for a Daydream"

2007 bonus DVD
No.	Title	Length
1.	"I'm Too Sexy" (Music video)
2.	"I'm Too Sexy 2007" (Music video)
3.	"Deeply Dippy" (Music video)
4.	"Don't Talk Just Kiss (Remix)" (Music video)
5.	"Hands Up for Lovers" (Music video)
6.	"Those Simple Things" (Music video)
7.	"A Love for All Seasons" (Music video)
8.	"What a Day for a Daydream" (Music video)

- Track listing as above on sleeve but actual DVD contains "Stick It Out" instead of "Hands Up for Lovers".

== Personnel ==
- Richard Fairbrass – lead vocals and backing vocals, bass
- Fred Fairbrass – guitars and backing vocals
- Rob Manzoli – electric guitar and backing vocals

with:

- Phil Spalding – bass
- TommyD – synthesizers, sampler, arranger, producer and backing vocals
- Phil Taylor – piano
- Malcolm Duncan – saxophone
- Sid Gould – trombone
- Neil Sidwell – trumpet
- Chuck Sabo – drums
- Jocelyn Brown – backing vocals
- Lily D – backing vocals
- Graham Bonnett – backing vocals, engineer
- Massive Gut – backing vocals
- Juliet Roberts – backing vocals
- Nick Ingman – arranger and string arrangements
- Ian Craig Marsh – programming
- Brian Pugsley – programming

Technical

- Guy Holmes – executive producer
- John McDonnel – engineer
- Ronen Tal – engineer
- Donal – assistant engineer, assistant
- Andy Houston – assistant engineer
- Andy Smith – assistant engineer

== Charts ==
=== Weekly charts ===
Weekly chart performance for Up
Chart (1992)	Peak position
Australian Albums (ARIA)	39
Austrian Albums (Ö3 Austria)	1
Canada Top Albums/CDs (RPM)	15
Dutch Albums (Album Top 100)	9
German Albums (Offizielle Top 100)	8
Hungarian Albums (MAHASZ)	24
New Zealand Albums (RMNZ)	23
Swedish Albums (Sverigetopplistan)	16
Swiss Albums (Schweizer Hitparade)	22
UK Albums (Official Charts)	1
US Billboard 200	46

=== Year-end charts ===
Year-end chart performance for Up
Chart (1992)	Position
Canada Top Albums/CDs (RPM)	82

== Sales and certifications ==
Certifications for Up
Region	Certification	Certified units/sales
Canada (Music Canada)	Platinum	100,000^{^}
Netherlands (NVPI)	Gold	50,000^{^}
United Kingdom (BPI)	2× Platinum	600,000^{^}
United States (RIAA)	Gold	500,000^{^}
^{^} Shipments figures based on certification alone.
