= Alien Superstar =

Song by Beyoncé

from the album Renaissance
- Released: July 29, 2022
- Studio: The Juicy Juicy and Parkwood West, Los Angeles
- Genre: House; dance-pop; synth-pop; electropop; ballroom; R&B
- Length: 3:35
- Label: Parkwood; Columbia
- Songwriters: Beyoncé; Honey Redmond; Christopher Penny; Luke Solomon; Denisia Andrews; Brittany Coney; Shawn Carter; David Brown; Dave Hamelin; Danielle Balbuena; Leven Kali; Atia Boggs; Levar Coppin; Saliou Diagne; Michael Dean; Rob Manzoli; Peter Rauhofer; Richard Fairbrass; Christopher Fairbrass; John Holiday; Barbara Ann Teer; Kim Cooper
- Producers: Beyoncé; Honey Dijon; Penny; Solomon; The-Dream; Mike Dean; Nova Wav; Kali

Lyric Video
- "Alien Superstar" on YouTube

"Alien Superstar" is a song recorded by American singer Beyoncé. It is the third track on her seventh studio album, Renaissance (2022), which was released on July 29, 2022, through Parkwood and Columbia.

== Composition ==
Pitchfork writer Julianne Escobedo Shepherd described the song as an "old way house anthem", comparing the track's musicality to that of Vanity 6. The "futuristic" dance-pop and R&B song features heavy synthesizer production and elements of ballroom music, such as usage of the term "category", throughout the song. Beyoncé raps in a monotone delivery during the verses, before singing over stacked vocals during the choruses.

The song features some cultural references, including Maya Angelou's poem "Still I Rise". The song samples an autobiographical recording by American writer and producer Barbara Ann Teer featured in Black Drama: "We dress a certain way. We walk a certain way. We talk a certain way. We paint a certain way. We make love a certain way, you know? All of these things we do in a different, unique specific way that is personally ours".

== Controversy ==
=== Right Said Fred's song "I'm Too Sexy" interpolation ===
On the week leading up to the release of Beyoncé album Renaissance, Fred and Richard Fairbrass of the British duo Right Said Fred stated that they were grateful to be credited on the project. On October 4, 2022 in an interview for The Sun the duo claimed that Beyoncé had used their song without their permission.

On October 7, 2022 Beyoncé's team shared a statement to Pitchfork defining the duo claim "erroneous and incredibly disparaging", because "the permission was not only granted for its use, but they publicly spoke of their gratitude for being on the album. For their song, there was no sound recording use, only the composition was utilized.Permission was asked of their publisher on May 11, 2022 and the publisher approved the use on June 15, 2022. They were paid for the usage in August, 2022. Furthermore, the copyright percentage of the Right Said Fred writers with respect to the use of "I’m Too Sexy" is a substantial portion of the composition. Collectively the Right Said Fred writers own more than any other singular writer and have co-writer credit."

=== Foremost Poets' song "Moonraker" sample ===
On July 29, 2025 Hirose Enterprises has filed a lawsuit against Parkwood Entertainment, Sony Music, Warner Chappell Music, centering on the intro sequence of the song sampling Foremost Poets' song "Moonraker". Although Foremost Poets, pseudonym of John Holiday, has granted the rights and is credited on the track, the lawsuit alleges that Holiday did not actually own the rights to the song because he did not require permission from the record label.

U.S. District Judge Mark C. Scarsi officially dismissed the case on June 26, 2026, stating that the company Hirose Enterprises had not been legally incorporated before filing the complaint, but only a week after the documents were filed in court. Parkwood also demonstrated that it had secured the rights to use the sample through a contract, with an initial payment of $10,000 and the signing of the related royalties agreement.

== Critical reception ==
Upon release of the parent album, "Alien Superstar" received positive reviews from critics. The New York Times called the song a "bold pop homage to ballroom culture" that delves into themes of Afrofuturism, and self-celebration. Kevin Fallon of The Daily Beast deemed it as Renaissance's "stand-out track", praising its "ode to queer dance-floor anthems".

Ranking it as the eighth best song off the album, Billboard praised the song's unconventional song structure, "warbling synths", and utilization of rapping and stacked vocals. Pitchfork and NPR both placed the song on their "Best Songs of 2022" lists, ranking at number five and number two respectively. The former publication called it a "new-gen ballroom staple" and compared its funky and electronic sound to that of Prince; in September 2024, they included it on their list of "The 100 Best Songs of the 2020s So Far", ranking it at number 24.

== Commercial performance ==
After the release of Renaissance, "Alien Superstar" debuted on the Billboard Hot 100 chart at number 19 and on the Hot R&B/Hip-Hop Songs chart at number eight.

== Personnel and credits ==
=== Samples ===
- contains an interpolation of "I'm Too Sexy", written by Rob Manzoli, Richard Fairbrass, and Christopher Fairbrass, and performed by Right Said Fred
- contains a sample of "Moonraker", written by John Holiday (Noble John Ali) performed by Foremost Poets
- contains a sample of Barbara Ann Teer's "Black Theater" autobiographical account
- contains a sample of "Unique", written by Kim Cooper and Peter Rauhofer and performed by Danube Dance

=== Recording locations ===
- The Juicy Juicy (Los Angeles, California)
- Parkwood West (Los Angeles, California)

=== Personnel ===
Performers

- Vocals by Beyoncé
- Background vocals by Blu June

Musicians

- Mike Dean – synths
- Honey Dijon – additional programming
- The-Dream – synths
- Chris Penny – keys and programming
- Luke Solomon – drum production and programming

Technical credits

- Beyoncé – production, vocal production
- Matheus Braz – assistant engineering
- Chi Coney – engineering
- John Cranfield – engineering
- Mike Dean – co-production
- Honey Dijon – production
- The-Dream – co-production
- NovaWav – additional production
- Chris Penny – production
- Andrea Roberts – engineering
- Luke Solomon – production
- Stuart White – mixing, recording

== Live performance ==
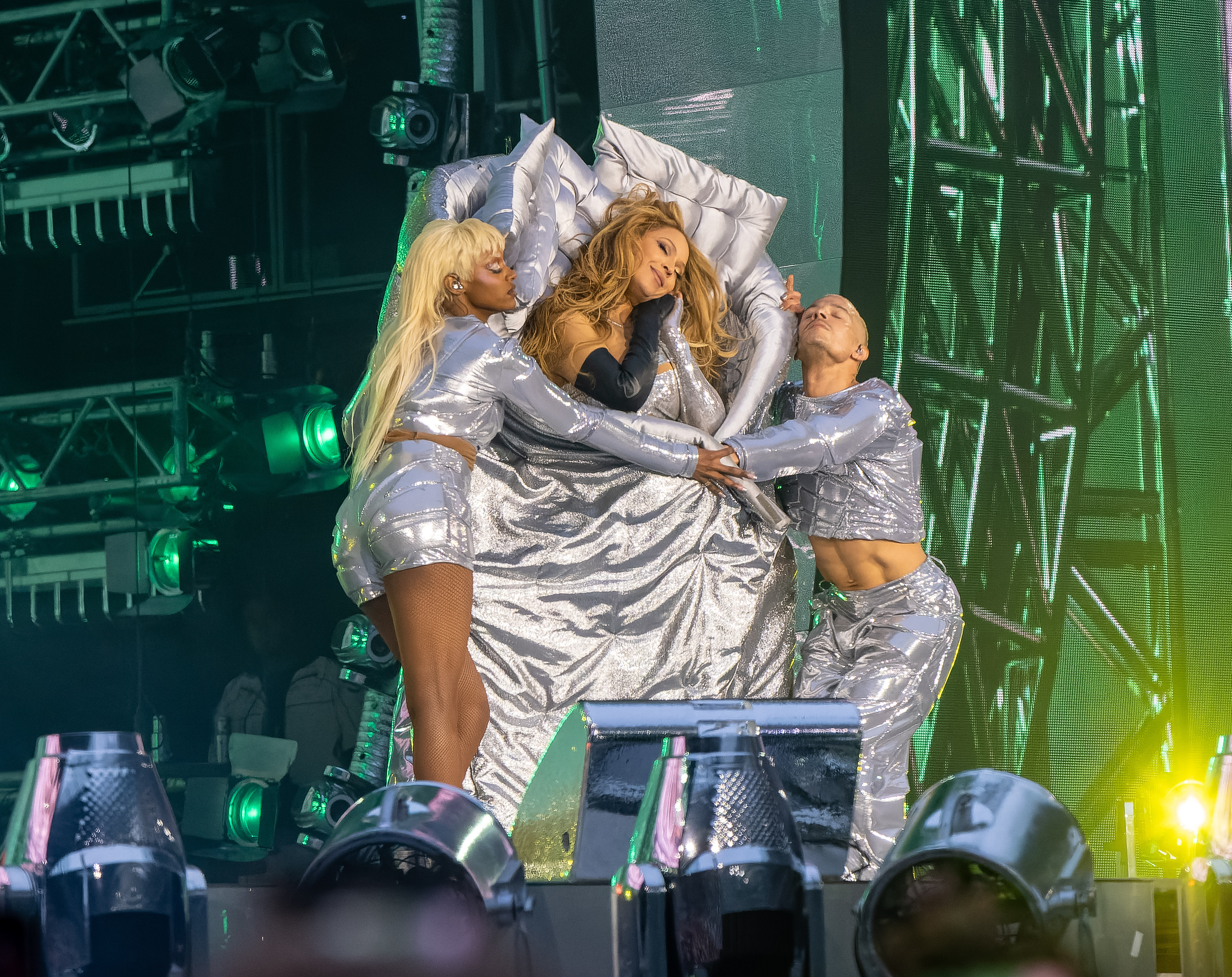
Beyoncé performing "Alien Superstar" on the Renaissance World Tour in 2023

Beyoncé first performed "Alien Superstar" in Stockholm, Sweden on the opening night of the Renaissance World Tour, including it on the setlist for the duration of the tour. The song is featured in the robotic-themed "Renaissance" act of the tour and follows a transition from "Cozy". The performance starts with Beyoncé pantomiming that she's asleep, with her dancers holding up a quilted bedspread and pillows designed by Victor Weinsanto. She then 'wakes up' and holds her hands up while spelling out "Unique" and counting down with her fingers. The performance continues with the song's intro. During the second chorus, elements of "Sweet Dreams" are used such as the instrumental and select lyrics.

Beyoncé wore a number of outfits during this section over the course of the tour, starting with a custom Courrèges outfit from the fall 2023 collection. At later dates, she wore a custom Philosophy di Lorenzo Serafini bodysuit, a metallic Balmain bodysuit, and a silver-and gold Lanvin bodysuit with cutouts.

During a performance of the song at a show in Arizona, an audio malfunction caused Beyoncé and her dancers to temporarily retreat. She then restarted the performance, wearing a new metallic outfit with wings designed by Juraj Zigman.

"Alien Superstar" remained on the setlist for the Cowboy Carter Tour in 2025 with a performance similar to how it was during the previous tour, omitting the "Lift Off" outro.

== Charts ==
=== Weekly charts ===
Weekly chart performance for "Alien Superstar"
Chart (2022)	Peak position
Australia (ARIA)	31
Canada Hot 100 (Billboard)	33
Canada CHR/Top 40 (Billboard)	33
France (SNEP)	73
Global 200 (Billboard)	15
Greece International (IFPI)	90
Iceland (Tónlistinn)	29
Ireland (IRMA)	17
New Zealand (Recorded Music NZ)	35
Portugal (AFP)	27
South Africa Streaming (TOSAC)	2
Switzerland (Schweizer Hitparade)	46
UK Singles (Official Charts)	16
US Billboard Hot 100	19
US Hot R&B/Hip-Hop Songs (Billboard)	8

=== Year-end charts ===
2022 year-end chart performance for "Alien Superstar"
Chart (2022)	Position
US Hot R&B/Hip-Hop Songs (Billboard)	83

== Certifications ==
Certifications for "Alien Superstar"
Region	Certification	Certified units/sales
Australia (ARIA)	Gold	35,000^{‡}
Brazil (Pro-Música Brasil)	Diamond	160,000^{‡}
Canada (Music Canada)	Gold	40,000^{‡}
France (SNEP)	Gold	100,000^{‡}
New Zealand (RMNZ)	Gold	15,000^{‡}
United Kingdom (BPI)	Silver	200,000^{‡}
United States (RIAA)	Platinum	1,000,000^{‡}
^{‡} Sales+streaming figures based on certification alone.
