= Stand Up (For the Champions) =

Single by Right Said Fred

from the album Stand Up
- Released: 8 July 2002
- Recorded: 2001
- Genre: Dance
- Label: Kingsize
- Songwriters: Richard Fairbrass; Fred Fairbass; Clyde Ward
- Producer: Right Said Fred

Right Said Fred singles chronology
"Love Song" (2001)	"Stand Up (For the Champions)" (2002)	"Where Do You Go to My Love?" (2006)

"Stand Up (For the Champions)" is a song by British band Right Said Fred from their album Stand Up in 2002. It has been used at sporting events around the world.

In 2009, the Saracens F.C. rugby squad recorded a version as their club anthem, "Stand up for the Saracens!"

The song was also played at Lord's during the 2009 T20 Cricket World Cup when Pakistan's national cricket team beat Sri Lanka in the final and won the World Cup.

In the United States, the song has been used by some National Football League teams.

In 2016, fans of the Lukanga Boxing Club used the song to celebrate after winning the Juniors and Elites titles at Uganda's National Open Boxing Championship.

In Pakistan, the song has been used for the celebration of Pakistan Cricket Team. It was played after the victory in the final against India at the 2017 ICC Champions Trophy in England.

A cover of the song was performed by Japanese boy band NEWS and released with their debut single "Kibou ~Yell~", which topped the Oricon singles chart in 2004. A rock version is included in the standard edition of NEWS' album Touch.

== Charts ==
Chart (2002)	Peak Position
German Singles Chart	14
Swiss Singles Chart	68
