= List of number-one hits of 1992 (Austria) =

This is a list of the Austrian Singles Chart number-one hits of 1992.

Issue date	Song	Artist
5 January	"Let's Talk About Sex"	Salt-n-Pepa
12 January	"Let's Talk About Sex"	Salt-n-Pepa
19 January	"Let's Talk About Sex"	Salt-n-Pepa
26 January	"Let's Talk About Sex"	Salt-n-Pepa
2 February	"Let's Talk About Sex"	Salt-n-Pepa
9 February	"Let's Talk About Sex"	Salt-n-Pepa
16 February	"Justified & Ancient"	The KLF
23 February	"Justified & Ancient"	The KLF
1 March	"Justified & Ancient"	The KLF
8 March	"Justified & Ancient"	The KLF
15 March	"Justified & Ancient"	The KLF
22 March	"Das Boot"	U96
29 March	"Das Boot"	U96
5 April	"I'm Too Sexy"	Right Said Fred
12 April	"Das Boot"	U96
19 April	"Das Boot"	U96
26 April	"Das Boot"	U96
3 May	"Das Boot"	U96
10 May	"Das Boot"	U96
17 May	"To Be with You"	Mr. Big
24 May	"To Be with You"	Mr. Big
31 May	"Rhythm Is a Dancer"	Snap!
7 June	"Rhythm Is a Dancer"	Snap!
14 June	"It's My Life"	Dr. Alban
21 June	"It's My Life"	Dr. Alban
28 June	"It's My Life"	Dr. Alban
5 July	"It's My Life"	Dr. Alban
12 July	"It's My Life"	Dr. Alban
19 July	"It's My Life"	Dr. Alban
26 July	"ABBA-esque"	Erasure
2 August	"ABBA-esque"	Erasure
9 August	"ABBA-esque"	Erasure
16 August	"ABBA-esque"	Erasure
23 August	"ABBA-esque"	Erasure
30 August	"ABBA-esque"	Erasure
6 September	"ABBA-esque"	Erasure
13 September	"Raumschiff Edelweiss"	Edelweiss
20 September	"ABBA-esque"	Erasure
27 September	"Raumschiff Edelweiss"	Edelweiss
4 October	"Raumschiff Edelweiss"	Edelweiss
11 October	"Raumschiff Edelweiss"	Edelweiss
18 October	"Birthday Song"	Power Pack
25 October	"Birthday Song"	Power Pack
1 November	"Birthday Song"	Power Pack
8 November	"Birthday Song"	Power Pack
15 November	"Birthday Song"	Power Pack
22 November	"Birthday Song"	Power Pack
29 November	"Birthday Song"	Power Pack
6 December	"Die da!?"	Die Fantastischen Vier
13 December	"Die da!?"	Die Fantastischen Vier
20 December	"Die da!?"	Die Fantastischen Vier
27 December	"Die da!?"	Die Fantastischen Vier

== See also ==
- 1992 in music
