= I'm a Celebrity (disambiguation) =

I'm a Celebrity...Get Me Out of Here!, nicknamed I'm a Celebrity, is an international reality television franchise that originated in the United Kingdom.

The term can also refer to:

== Television shows ==
- I'm a Celebrity...Get Me Out of Here! (British TV series), the British original series
  - I'm a Celebrity...South Africa, the all-stars spin-off series
- I'm a Celebrity...Get Me Out of Here! (American TV series), the American adaptation
- I'm a Celebrity...Get Me Out of Here! (Australian TV series), the Australian adaptation
- Ich bin ein Star – Holt mich hier raus!, the German adaptation

== Music ==
- I'm a Celebrity (album), by Right Said Fred
