= Something in Your Eyes =

Something in Your Eyes may refer to:

- "Something in Your Eyes" (Bell Biv DeVoe song), 1993
- "Something in Your Eyes" (Jenny Silver song), 2011, covered by Steps in 2020
- "Something in Your Eyes" (Richard Carpenter song), 1987
- "Something in Your Eyes", a song by Ed Case, 1999
- "Something in Your Eyes", a song by Price, 2008
- "Something in Your Eyes", a song by Right Said Fred from Stand Up, 2002
- "Something in Your Eyes", a song by Shonlock, 2010
