= Deeply Dippy =

1992 single by Right Said Fred

Single by Right Said Fred

from the album Up
- B-side: "Deeply Dubby"
- Released: 9 March 1992
- Length: 3:21
- Label: Tug
- Songwriters: Richard Fairbrass; Fred Fairbrass; Rob Manzoli
- Producer: Tommy D

Right Said Fred singles chronology
| "Don't Talk Just Kiss" (1991) | "Deeply Dippy" (1992) | "Those Simple Things" / "Daydream" (1992) |

"Deeply Dippy" is a song by British trio Right Said Fred from their debut album, Up (1992). Written by Right Said Fred and produced by Tommy D, "Deeply Dippy" was released in March 1992 by Tug Records as the third single by the trio. It peaked atop the UK Singles Chart for three weeks in April 1992. Outside the United Kingdom, "Deeply Dippy" reached number one in Ireland and entered the top 20 in Austria, Belgium, Germany, the Netherlands, and New Zealand. The song failed to chart on the US Billboard Hot 100 but did peak at number nine on Billboard Dance Club Play chart. NME ranked "Deeply Dippy" number 22 in their list of "Singles of the Year" in December 1992.

== Track listings ==
- UK 7-inch and cassette single
1. "Deeply Dippy" (single mix)
2. "Deeply Dubby" (single mix)
- UK CD single
1. "Deeply Dippy" (single mix)
2. "Deeply Dippy" (Deeply Brassy)
3. "Deeply Dippy" (Deeply Nervous)
4. "I'm Too Sexy" (extended club mix)
- Australian CD single
1. "Deeply Dippy" (single mix)
2. "Deeply Dippy" (Deeply Brassy)
3. "I'm Too Sexy" (Italian version)

== Charts ==
=== Weekly charts ===
| Chart (1992) | Peak position |
|---|---|
| Australia (ARIA) | 38 |
| Austria (Ö3 Austria Top 40) | 6 |
| Belgium (Ultratop 50 Flanders) | 14 |
| Canada Top Singles (RPM) | 82 |
| Denmark (IFPI) | 7 |
| Europe (Eurochart Hot 100) | 3 |
| Europe (European Dance Radio) | 19 |
| Germany (GfK) | 15 |
| Ireland (IRMA) | 1 |
| Italy (Musica e dischi) | 22 |
| Netherlands (Dutch Top 40) | 10 |
| Netherlands (Single Top 100) | 9 |
| New Zealand (Recorded Music NZ) | 11 |
| Sweden (Sverigetopplistan) | 26 |
| Switzerland (Schweizer Hitparade) | 23 |
| UK Singles (Official Charts) | 1 |
| UK Airplay (Music Week) | 1 |
| US Dance Club Songs (Billboard) | 9 |

=== Year-end charts ===
| Chart (1992) | Position |
|---|---|
| Belgium (Ultratop) | 94 |
| Europe (Eurochart Hot 100) | 32 |
| Germany (Media Control) | 64 |
| Netherlands (Dutch Top 40) | 53 |
| Netherlands (Single Top 100) | 69 |
| UK Singles (OCC) | 12 |
| UK Airplay (Music Week) | 8 |

== Certifications ==
| Region | Certification | Certified units/sales |
|---|---|---|
| United Kingdom (BPI) | Silver | 200,000^{^} |
^{^} Shipments figures based on certification alone.

== Release history ==
| Region | Date | Format(s) | Label(s) | Ref. |
|---|---|---|---|---|
| United Kingdom | 9 March 1992 | 7-inch vinyl; 12-inch vinyl; CD; cassette | Tug | |
| Australia | 6 April 1992 | 12-inch vinyl; CD; cassette | Liberation; Tug | |

== Covers ==
The song was later covered by the Rockingbirds, on the Terence Higgins Trust, supporting charity EP The Fred EP.

== In popular culture ==
The song was featured in an advert for Sun Bingo in September 2015. It was also featured in an advert, "Deal of the Decade", for the range of the Fiat Punto and Fiat Stilo, in July 2002. The song's background music, was also featured, and used by Heart Yorkshire, for their Yorkshire Song in July 2014, as promotion for the bike race, the Tour de France, with changed lyrics to be based around Yorkshire.
