= The Desert Forges =

- Created by: Pierre Sportolaro
- Based on: Les Forges du Désert
- Presented by: Richard Fairbrass; Gabrielle Richens
- Starring: Melanie Winiger as The Poetess
- Country of origin: France
- No. of series: 1
- No. of episodes: 10

Production
- Production locations: Wadi Rum, Jordan
- Running time: 60 minutes (inc. adverts)
- Production companies: Grundy and Adventure Line Productions

Original release
- Network: Channel 5
- Release: 23 June – 25 August 2001

Related
- Fort Boyard; The Crystal Maze

The Desert Forges is a game show set in the Wadi Rum desert region in Jordan. It was first aired on Channel 5 from 23 June to 25 August 2001. It is based on a French format called Les Forges du Désert, created by Pierre Sportolaro in 1999 and produced by Adventure Line Productions, also producers of Fort Boyard.

Each episode starts with two teams, each with two contestants, one male and one female. They are referred to as the green team and the orange team (identified by the colour of their clothing), and are usually a couple, friends, or brother and sister. Both teams go through a series of challenges, and the winning team gets the chance to win gold ingots, which they cast themselves from the Forges Room.

== UK cast ==
The show was presented by Richard Fairbrass and Gabrielle Richens, with Melanie Winiger starring as the Poetess, ruler of the Palace.

Minor characters include Zioto who starts the time during the Palace challenges, Abdullah, the timekeeper in the Desert Duels who fires a rifle to indicate the start and end of the clock, the Forgemaster who runs the Forges Room, Zach and Ramm (identified by video cameras attached to their heads), who act as the "eyes and ears" of the Poetess and allow her to watch the progress made by the two teams, and Meliha, a guide who guides teams between houses in the Palace.

== Format ==
The show is divided into three segments: the Desert Duels, The Palace and the Forges Room.

=== Desert Duels ===
This first part of the show consists of four challenges out in the desert. Some duels involve all four team members, but many are limited to two.

In the first game, team members compete to determine who gains control of a dagger, and the winner of each subsequent game takes or retains the dagger. The team with the dagger generally sets the standard for the other team to follow. Each duel won also gains a flame for the winning team, which they'll use in the second part of the show.

Many of the desert duels take the form of a staggered race – the team possessing the dagger starts by releasing a sand-timer, and the other team starts when that timer runs out. At the end of the race, the first starter releases another sand timer with the same amount of sand. If the second starter catches up with and tags the first starter during the race, or if they arrive before the second sand-timer runs out, they'll win; otherwise, the first starter wins.

Due to the roughness of some challenges, like the Mechanical Snake, one of the presenters will look after the dagger for the contestant until he or she finishes.

Duels include:

- The 7 Pillars: The male contestant from the first team has to jump as far as he can along a set of seven increasingly spaced pillars within one minute. His partner then hides the dagger in a box at the side of the pillar and, as long as the male contestant did not fall off the pillar, screws the box up tightly. The other team then jumps across the pillars to find the knife within one minute, pulling a rope revealing to their partner whether the dagger is in the box or not. If it is, the female player must unscrew it within the required time to win.
- The Well: The female contestant has to move the dagger through a track encased in a cage farther than her opponents can. The track is blocked by metal poles, which she must push using a thin rod. At the same time, her male partner is suspended upside-down with his head inside the "well", a tank of water. If he comes up for air, the female must stop and wait for him until he drops his head back in the tank. Each team has sixty seconds.
- 4 Charms: The female contestants perform a staggered race over an assault course. The contestants must collect four necklaces from posts in the course, before proceeding to the end. The necklaces are attached by clips which must be unscrewed before the necklace can be taken.
- Rope Bridge: The male contestant from each team start at opposites ends of a precarious rope bridge and have to traverse wooden boards separated two feet apart to reach the dagger in the middle.
- Water Carriers: One contestant from each team takes part in a staggered race, carrying two heavy containers of water over their back, suspended from a heavy rod. They must proceed through a series of obstacles to the end.
- Duel Under the Sun: The male contestants are tied to three different-sized lengths of rope. They must release themselves free from each rope to reach their partner, who are tied up to posts. To release themselves from each rope, they must release a tool from a cage by means of spinning a locking wheel and removing rods clamping down the cage. When the male players reach their partner, they must cut her free from the post. The first female competitor to reach the dagger at the other side of the course wins her team the dagger.
- Mechanical Snake: Each player from both teams must traverse a large rotating wooden cylinder covered with ropes and slatted boards. The female player of the first team pulls a sand timer and then makes her way through the cylinder. When she reaches the other side, she'll run back to the beginning and tags her partner who must also complete the course, after which, he'll pull a sand timer. If the second can reach the timer before it runs out, then, they'll win the dagger, otherwise, the first team wins. In addition, any player tagged by their opponent loses.
- Head In The Sand: The male contestant from each team will have his head inside a container, where a pile of sand will be poured onto him. While his head is in the sand, he must turn a metal handle (which represents the dagger) to navigate the metal rail as far as possible, while traversing obstacles. The team with the dagger will try to get the handle as far away from the start as possible for their opponents, who will try to get the handle back to the start. There is no time limit for this duel and the position of the male contestant’s left hand must stay on the container to show that he is continuing. The moment his left hand is off the container, the duel will end for theirhis team and the sand will be poured out of the bottom. If the second team gets the handle back to the start, they’ll win the dagger; otherwise, the first team will keep the dagger.

==== Chakria ====
If there is a tie after the four Desert Duels have been completed, a tiebreaker called the Chakria is played. Here, the male or female from each team compete in a match similar to sumo wrestling. The team whose fighter puts his/her foot outside the circular ring first loses, and one of their flames is extinguished.

=== The Palace ===
The second part of the show takes the players into the Palace, a series of tents and buildings in the middle of the desert where the Poetess resides. The teams and presenters arrive at the Palace by camel.

Inside the Palace, there are a number of challenges, and during the course of the show four will be played. There is also a room called the Forges Room, which holds forges containing molten gold. When a challenge is successfully completed, one of the forges is lit. As more challenges are won, larger forges are lit, and if all the challenges are completed successfully, the largest forge is lit. Each forge contains an increasing amount of gold.

The teams are taken to the Poetess' tent. Here, the two members of each team bound together by the wrists, and taken into a room containing their first challenge. The other team waits in the tent as they may get the chance to win the gold later.

At the start of each challenge, a candle is lit. This candle has a limited lifespan, and if it goes out, the team loses the challenge. The team members must also ensure that they do not accidentally blow out the candle or expose it to water or air.

To win, the team members must ignite a fuse that lights one of the gold forges. If the team is unsuccessful, they'll lose a flame and must return to the Poetess's tent to retrieve another one. If they lose all their flames, their opponents get the chance to win the gold by completing the remaining challenges using their flames. Their binding helps to impede their progress through the course.

Challenges in the Palace include:

- Extinguisher: The candle is placed on a pulley system, and the team must traverse through an obstacle course to the other side of the room, keeping tension on a rope used to balance the candle vertically. If the rope is pulled too hard, the candle is snuffed out by a piece of metal above it. Not hard enough, and the candle falls into a jug of water. Their binding impedes their progress through the course.
- Tightrope: The players try to traverse a tightrope whilst holding the candle.
- Obstacle Labyrinth: The players must crawl through confined spaces, while protecting their candle from traps which spill water or flour in an attempt to extinguish it. The fuse is at the end of the maze.
- Candle Push: One player must pull down awkwardly-placed stirrups with their foot to release some obstacles while the other uses a thin metal rod to push the candle, on a brick through a course. The distance between the stirrup and the rod increases steadily, and because the team is restricted by the binding, the game becomes increasingly difficult as it progresses.
- Floating Steps: The players must use the three planks provided to get across the room to the other side and light the fuse without touching the floor. The planks attach to slots in the side of the wall, which the players must stand on. If any object touches the floor, fans activate from the ceiling to blow out the candle.
- Hammock: The team must traverse a webbed net of ropes suspended in the air to reach the fuse on the other side.
- Turnstile: The team have to attach rods, with a wick on the end of each one, to a rotating turnstile. The wick of each rope is lit by the candle and the turnstile is rotated towards the fuse. The catch is that some of the rods are too short for the wick to light the fuse, so the team must choose each rod wisely.

When all four challenges are completed, the active team answers their last jidi (see below) and are led to the Forges Room.

==== Jidis ====
Before each challenge, other than the first one, the participating team is asked a jidi – a mathematical or logical problem with a numerical answer. Each jidi earns the team extra time in the Forges Room. The team can ask for the jidi to be repeated twice, but must give their answer fairly quickly. They are not told whether their answer is correct at this time.

After the four challenges are complete, the Poetess asks the active team their fourth and final jidi, before revealing which jidis were answered correctly. The four answers form a sequence, and the team must determine the next number in the sequence if they wish to skip a time-consuming part of the game later on. The sequences are usually complicated enough to be unsolvable without at least three of the jidi answers. They are not told whether the answer to the sequence is correct; they must tell it to the Forgemaster in the Forges Room.

==== The Snake Pit ====
If both teams lose all their flames or if a team loses its last flame on the fourth challenge, a playoff is used to decide which team will enter the Forges Room.

One contestant from each team is placed in a box with a large number of snakes, and must remain completely still. Any head movement results in a bulb lighting, and the player is declared the loser of the playoff. If neither player lights their bulb within one minute of the snakes being released, the team that won the Chakria goes on to the Forges Room.

=== The Forges Room ===
The team that progresses from the challenges in the Palace then gets the chance to forge their own gold in the Forges Room. Accompanied by one of the hosts, they have four minutes from the time they enter the mine tunnels to perform a series of tasks to win the gold.

First, they have to move a mine cart down a rail track to the other end of the tunnel. During this, they have to complete a task to remove an obstruction blocking the cart. This may involve completing an electrical circuit in a glass case or connecting a series of cogs together to raise a gate blocking the cart.

If none of the forges were lit during the second section, the team must retrieve a key from the mine cart, full of rocks, to unlock a cage and ring a bell, which causes the smallest forge to be lit.

There, after donning protective clothing, the team enters the Forges Room itself. There, the fifth number in the sequence from earlier on is given to the Forgemaster. If it is correct, the crucible for the molten gold is automatically released, but if not, the team must release it manually, using up about 30 seconds of time.

Assisted by forge workers, and with the four-minute clock still ticking, the team pours the gold from the largest lit forge into the crucible and then pours the gold from there into moulds. The team wins a fixed cash amount based on each ingot; half-filled moulds do not count.

== International versions ==
Country	Local title	Presenters (filming years)	Channel	Broadcast
Canada (Québec)	Les forges du Désert	André Robitaille	TVA	2000–2001
France	Les forges du Désert	Jean-Luc Reichmann and Karine Le Marchand	France 2	1999–2000
Denmark	Jagten på ørkenguldet	Peter Hansen and Gitte Schnell	TV3	1999
Germany	Desert Forges - Stars an ihren Grenzen	Sonya Kraus and Alexander Mazza	ProSieben	2001–2002
Norway	Jakten på Ørkengullet	Susanne Steffens (1999)	TV3	2000
Sweden	Jakten på ökenguldet	Harald Treutiger and My Klingwall	TV3	1999

The format was also sold to broadcasters in Belgium (VT4) and Jordan. An Arabic children's game show was filmed using the same set and broadcast around 2011, on Jeem TV. The American, Australian and British versions of SAS: Who Dares Wins were also filmed here in 2022 and October 2021 respectively.
