= Smashing! =

Studio album by Right Said Fred
- Released: 1996
- Recorded: 1995–96
- Genre: Dance, pop rock
- Label: Happy Valley

Right Said Fred chronology
Sex and Travel (1993)	Smashing! (1996)	Fredhead (2001)

Smashing!, released in 1996, is the third album by English pop group, Right Said Fred.

Professional ratings
Review scores
Source	Rating
Allmusic	link

== Track listing ==
1. "Everybody Loves Me"
2. "Brick by Brick"
3. "Big Time"
4. "Ruby Don't Take Your Love to Town"
5. "You Want Kissing"
6. "La Samba"
7. "Living on a Dream"
8. "'Til the Sun Goes Cold"
9. "Favorite Thrill"
10. "Mr. Bad Vibe"
11. "Radio"
12. "ABC"
13. "Place I Know (The Fairy Song)"
