= Stop the World – I Want to Get Off (disambiguation) =

Stop the World – I Want to Get Off is a 1961 musical by Leslie Bricusse and Anthony Newley.

Stop the World – I Want to Get Off may also refer to:

- Stop the World I Want to Get Off (album), a 1962 album by Victor Feldman
- Stop the World, I Want to Get Off, a 1966 film adaptation of the musical directed by Philip Saville
- Stop the World, I Want to Get Off, a 1996 TV film adaptation of the musical starring Peter Scolari
- "Stop the World I Want to Get Off", a song by Gorky Park from their 1996 album Stare

== See also ==
- Stop the World (disambiguation)
- "Stop the World I Wanna Get Off With You", a 2013 B-side to the Arctic Monkeys single, "Why'd You Only Call Me When You're High?"
