= Don't Talk Just Kiss =

1991 single by Right Said Fred

Single by Right Said Fred

from the album Up
- Released: 25 November 1991
- Genre: Dance
- Length: 4:01
- Label: Tug
- Songwriters: Richard Fairbrass; Fred Fairbrass; Rob Manzoli
- Producer: Tommy D

Right Said Fred singles chronology
"I'm Too Sexy" (1991)	"Don't Talk Just Kiss" (1991)	"Deeply Dippy" (1992)

Music video
- "Don't Talk Just Kiss" on YouTube

"Don't Talk Just Kiss" is a song by English pop trio Right Said Fred, released in November 1991 by Tug Records as the second single from their debut album, Up (1992). The song was written by Richard Fairbrass, Fred Fairbrass and Rob Manzoli, and produced by Tommy D. It features uncredited duet vocals by American R&B and dance music singer Jocelyn Brown, although she appears in the accompanying music video, which was directed by James Le Bon.

"Don't Talk Just Kiss" reached number three in the United Kingdom in December 1991 and became a top-10 hit in several international territories, including Germany, where it peaked at number two and was certified gold. The song was released in the United States in February 1992, peaking at number 76 on the Billboard Hot 100 and number eight on the Billboard Dance Club Play chart.

== Critical reception ==
AllMusic editor Stephen Schnee described the song as a "delectable slice of '90s disco". J.D. Considine from The Baltimore Sun felt that "there's not enough of the single's goofy charm to sustain disco throwbacks" like "Don't Talk Just Kiss". Billboard magazine found that singer Richard Fairbrass "has a distinctive baritone voice", adding that he "shines brightest" on the song. Billboard editor Larry Flick wrote, "Now that they've proven how "sexy" they are, Fred and friends want you to pucker up...immediately." He also complimented it as "an equally appealing pop/house gem that benefits from a guest vocal from club dynamo Jocelyn Brown" and an "infectious hook". Clark and DeVaney from Cash Box commented, "Who would have ever figured a couple of body builders would cause such a ruckus in the music business?". They added that "Don't Talk Just Kiss" "is actually more of a real song than its predecessor, but still manages to contain enough of a repetitious beat to keep this act in the clubs."

Andy Kastanas from The Charlotte Observer wrote, "Not only does it borrow its sound from disco of the '70s, but it borrows one of its personalities. Disco diva Jocelyn Brown lends her vocal chords to R.S.F. to make for a rollicking good dance song." Alan Jones from Music Week's RM Dance Update declared it as "a Seventies-flavoured disco groove allowing Jocelyn plenty of opportunities to ad-lib, which she does in her usual paint-blistering manner." Johnny Dee from Smash Hits named it "another cracker" and "a brilliant pop record – funny catchy, you can do daft dances to it. The lyrics are great too – "Don't talk just kiss/Let your tongue fool around"."

== Track listings ==
- UK CD single
1. "Don't Talk Just Kiss" (7-inch mix)
2. "Don't Talk Just Kiss" (Dick's mix)
3. "Don't Talk Just Kiss" (Miss Browns Dolly Mixture)
4. "Don't Talk Just Kiss" (Beat Nicked mix)
- UK 7-inch single and Australian cassette single
1. "Don't Talk Just Kiss"
2. "Don't Talk Just Kiss" (instrumental)
- UK 12-inch single

A1. "Don't Talk Just Kiss" (Dick's mix)
A2. "Don't Talk Just Kiss" (7-inch mix)
B1. "Don't Talk Just Kiss" (Miss Browns Dolly Mixture)
B2. "Don't Talk Just Kiss" (Beat Nicked mix)

- US CD single
1. "Don't Talk Just Kiss" (7-inch UK version) – 3:13
2. "Don't Talk Just Kiss" (7-inch dance mix) – 3:32
3. "Don't Talk Just Kiss" (Deep Throat mix) – 4:35
4. "Don't Talk Just Kiss" (Suck Face 12-inch mix) – 6:18
5. "Don't Talk Just Kiss" (Fredo's vocal dub) – 4:41
6. "Don't Talk Just Kiss" (Dick's 12-inch mix) – 7:14
- US cassette single
1. "Don't Talk Just Kiss" (7-inch UK version) – 3:13
2. "Don't Talk Just Kiss" (7-inch dance mix) – 3:32
- Australian CD single
1. "Don't Talk Just Kiss" (7-inch mix)
2. "Don't Talk Just Kiss" (Miss Browns Dolly Mixture)
3. "Don't Talk Just Kiss" (Dick's mix)

== Charts ==
=== Weekly charts ===
Chart (1991–1992)	Peak position
Australia (ARIA)	18
Austria (Ö3 Austria Top 40)	5
Belgium (Ultratop 50 Flanders)	11
Canada Top Singles (RPM)	36
Canada Dance/Urban (RPM)	5
Denmark (IFPI)	5
Europe (Eurochart Hot 100)	8
Europe (European Dance Radio)	9
Finland (Suomen virallinen lista)	4
Germany (GfK)	2
Greece (Virgin)	10
Ireland (IRMA)	8
Luxembourg (Radio Luxembourg)	18
Netherlands (Dutch Top 40)	3
Netherlands (Single Top 100)	3
New Zealand (Recorded Music NZ)	16
Sweden (Sverigetopplistan)	4
Switzerland (Schweizer Hitparade)	7
UK Singles (Official Charts)	3
UK Airplay (Music Week)	3
UK Dance (Music Week)	47
US Billboard Hot 100	76
US Dance Club Songs (Billboard)	8
US Dance Singles Sales (Billboard)	9
US Cash Box Top 100	60

=== Year-end charts ===
Chart (1991)	Position
UK Singles (OCC)	80

Chart (1992)	Position
Austria (Ö3 Austria Top 40)	26
Belgium (Ultratop)	26
Brazil (Crowley)	51
Canada Dance/Urban (RPM)	42
Europe (Eurochart Hot 100)	23
Europe (European Dance Radio)	16
Germany (Media Control)	8
Netherlands (Dutch Top 40)	19
Netherlands (Single Top 100)	17
Sweden (Topplistan)	28

== Certifications ==
Region	Certification	Certified units/sales
Germany (BVMI)	Gold	250,000^{^}
^{^} Shipments figures based on certification alone.

== Release history ==
Region	Date	Format(s)	Label(s)	Ref(s).
United Kingdom	25 November 1991	7-inch vinyl; 12-inch vinyl; CD; cassette	Tug	
Australia	3 February 1992	7-inch vinyl; 12-inch vinyl; CD; cassette	Tug; Liberation	
United States	27 February 1992	12-inch vinyl; CD	Charisma	
Japan	17 April 1992	CD	Charisma; Virgin Japan	
