= For Sale (Right Said Fred album) =

Studio album by Right Said Fred
- Released: 23 January 2006
- Recorded: 2005–06
- Genre: Electronica
- Label: Ministry of Sound
- Producer: Stuart Crichton; Clyde Ward; Graham Stack; Right Said Fred

Right Said Fred chronology
Stand Up (2002)	For Sale (2006)	I'm a Celebrity (2008)

Singles from For Sale
- 1. "Where Do You Go To My Love?" Released: 16 January 2006

For Sale is the sixth album by British pop group Right Said Fred.

Professional ratings
Review scores
Source	Rating
Allmusic	link

== Track listing ==
1. “I Love My Car”
2. “Play On”
3. “Where Do You Go To My Lovely?”
4. “Brand New Girlfriend”
5. “Drifting”
6. “Cry”
7. “Sweet Wonderful You”
8. “Kiss My Softly”
9. “Love Pressure”
10. “Jump Start”
11. "Cost of Loving”
12. “Simple”
13. “Obvious”
14. “Here I Am”
15. “Worthless Love”
16. “Hollywood Ending”
