= Jagged Edge (British band) =

British glam metal/rock band

Jagged Edge, also known as Jagged Edge UK in the United States where there is an American R&B vocal group with the same name, were a glam metal/rock band formed in London in 1985 by Myke Gray, former guitarist of the band Dorian Gray and briefly of UFO, and bassist/vocalist Billy Kulke.

== History ==
Formed in 1985. the band went through numerous line-up changes before a somewhat stable line-up emerged. This line-up consisted of Gray, rhythm section of bassist/vocalist Billy Kulke (current Letz Zep frontman), and later Di´Anno/Killers drummer Steve Hopgood along with ex-Baby Tuckoo and Accept vocalist Rob Armitage. The band toured with Ozzy Osbourne in the UK during June and July 1988.

However, this line-up split before the band was signed to Polydor Records, and the band's first EP, as well as the album Fuel for Your Soul, was recorded by the 1989 line-up of Gray, Swedish vocalist Matt Alfonzetti (ex-Bam Bam Boys), bassist Andy Robbins (ex-Tokyo Blade and Shogun), and Italian drummer Fabio Del Rio (who, incidentally, was a member of UFO shortly after Gray's brief tenure). The line-up also included keyboardist Dave Rosingana who performed with Flashpoint, another rock band (not the Miami jazz ensemble).

After touring for the album, Polydor dropped the band, which then split up. They played their last show in Dudley on 14 July 1991 and the members moved on to other projects. Gray started a successful career as studio musician and songwriter, including co-writing the Right Said Fred hit, "You're My Mate", and performing under the handle of Sickboy. Alfonzetti and Gray have started playing together again in the band Red, White and Blues which released an album titled Shine.

Founder member Billy Kulke went on to form a melodic rock band called First Strike along with ex-Samson vocalist Mick White. The band toured extensively from 1989 to their disbanding in 1992. They toured with Giant, Uriah Heep, Slaughter and Dare. They released one album entitled Just Another Night via Steelheart Records

== Personnel ==
Period	Lineup	Releases
Dorian Gray band (pre-Jagged Edge)	Myke Gray - Guitar; Andy Bierne - Drums (ex Grand Prix, Praying Mantis)	None
Early 1985	D.D - Vocals; Myke Gray - Guitar; Billy Kulke - Bass/vocals; Alan Nelson - Keyboards; Gary Murrel - Drums	"Star" and "Be the One" demo, Neil Murray produced demo. And tour in 1986 in the UK with Japanese rock band Vow Wow.
Mid 1986	Ian Baker - Vocals (ex Bronz, Blueprint); Myke Gray - Guitar; Billy Kulke - Bass/vocals; Rod Quinn - Drums	Live concerts and demo Raised on Rock, Girl Outta Nowhere and Message out to You
1987–1988	Rob Armitage - Vocals (ex Accept, Baby Tuckoo); Myke Gray - Guitar; Billy Kulke - Bass/vocals; Steve Hopgood - Drums (ex Chinatown, Persian Risk, Bronz)	Demo and tour with Ozzy Osbourne
1989–1990	Matti Alfonzetti - Vocals (Talisman, Skintrade); Myke Gray - Guitar; Andy Robbins - Bass (Skin, Tokyo Blade); Fabio Del Rio - Drums (Bruce Dickinson)	"Trouble", "Fuel for Your Soul"

== Discography ==
=== Studio albums ===
- Fuel for Your Soul (1990)

=== Extended plays ===
- Trouble (1989)
