= Sex and Travel =

Studio album by Right Said Fred
- Released: 1 November 1993
- Recorded: 1992–1993
- Genre: Dance-pop
- Labels: Tug; Virgin
- Producer: Right Said Fred

Right Said Fred chronology
Up (1992)	Sex and Travel (1993)	Smashing! (1996)

Singles from Sex and Travel
- 1. "Bumped" Released: 1993; 2. "Hands Up (4 Lovers)" Released: 1993; 3. "Wonderman" Released: 1994

Professional ratings
Review scores
Source	Rating
AllMusic	3.5/5 stars
Encyclopedia of Popular Music	3/5 stars
Music Week	3/5 stars
NME	5/10
Select	2/5 medals

Sex and Travel is the second album by British pop group Right Said Fred, released on 1 November 1993. It contains the singles from the UK Top 60, "Bumped", "Hands Up (4 Lovers)" and "Wonderman". The album peaked at No. 35 on the UK Albums Chart. The lyrics to "Wonderman" were re-written for its release as a single in February 1994, as part of a promotional campaign for Sega's video game Sonic the Hedgehog 3.

== Track listing ==
1. "Hands Up (4 Lovers)"
2. "Bumped"
3. "It's Not the Way"
4. "She's My Mrs."
5. "We Live a Life"
6. "Rocket Town"
7. "Turn Me On"
8. "Back to You"
9. "I Ain't Stupid"
10. "Wonderman"
11. "Comfort Me"
12. "Sunshine Sex Drive"

== Charts ==
Chart performance for Sex and Travel
Chart (1993)	Peak position
Australian Albums (ARIA)	145
Austrian Albums (Ö3 Austria)	35
Dutch Albums (Album Top 100)	91
German Albums (Offizielle Top 100)	88
UK Albums (Official Charts)	35
