= Gabrielle Richens =

British model and television presenter (born 1974)

- Born: 14 September 1974 (age 52); Kent, England
- Occupations: Model; television presenter
- Modeling information
- Height: 1.71 m (5 ft 7 1/2 in)

Gabrielle Richens (born 14 September 1974) is a British model and television presenter. She was born in Kent of British, Indian and Chinese descent, although her parents are from South Africa. Richens has worked as a model since she was fifteen when she was discovered while shopping on King's Road. Thereafter, she signed with the Elite modeling agency. She was nicknamed "The Pleasure Machine" after an airline commercial she appeared in. She has risen to fame in particular in Australia.

== Modeling career ==
Richens captured the eye of the Australian public and rode the wave of popularity generated from her relationship with professional rugby league footballer Solomon Haumono, eventually leading to an appearance in Ralph magazine. Richens then posed nude for Australian Black+White magazine as well as the March 1999 Australian Playboy edition. She returned to the United Kingdom at the end of 2001.

Richens placed in the UK edition of FHM's 100 Sexiest Women in the World in 2002 (41st), 2003 (69th) and 2004 (71st). She was also ranked 14th Sexiest Woman in the World by Maxim.

== Television career ==
In 2001 Richens co-presented the television game show The Desert Forges (with Richard Fairbrass) for Channel 5, and went on to present 3001: A Sex Oddity; a quirky, sex-orientated 'documentary' series in 2002. She was also the host of a short-lived Australian dating show called Love Rules.

Richens has appeared on two Australian celebrity reality shows Dancing with the Stars and Australian Celebrity Survivor: Vanuatu. She also appeared in an episode of CSI entitled "Time of Your Death" and an episode of How I Met Your Mother entitled "Single Stamina".

== Personal life ==
Richens shot to fame in Australia following her highly publicised relationship with professional rugby league footballer Solomon Haumono. The publicity surrounding their relationship focused on the manner in which the pair met and Haumono's actions subsequent to this. After having met Richens in a Sydney night club, Haumono, then a contracted player to the Canterbury Bulldogs in the National Rugby League, left for the United Kingdom mid-season to be with Richens. Haumono had not informed his family or his club of his decision and this highly jeopardised his rugby league career. Much debate was generated as to whether his contract with the Bulldogs should have been terminated upon his return to Australia as a result of his actions. Richens and Haumono are no longer together. Haumono later admitted the trip, and Richens’s role in it, was a ruse he concocted to force the Bulldogs to sack him and enable him to sign a new contract with the St George Dragons.
