= I'm a Celebrity (album) =

Studio album by Right Said Fred
- Released: 14 October 2008
- Recorded: 2007–08
- Genre: Pop rock
- Label: Promark Music
- Producer: Peo Haggstrom, Ricky Hanley

Right Said Fred chronology
For Sale (2006)	I'm a Celebrity (2008)	Stop the World (2011)

Singles from I'm a Celebrity
- 1. "I'm a Celebrity" Released: 2008

I'm a Celebrity is the seventh studio album by British pop group Right Said Fred. It yielded one single: "I'm a Celebrity". An exposé of celebrity life, it has gained airplay in both the United States and United Kingdom.

Professional ratings
Review scores
Source	Rating
Allmusic	link

== Track listing ==
1. "I'm a Celebrity"
2. "Melanie"
3. "I Am a Bachelor"
4. "Sex Is the Common Ground"
5. "Why Do I?"
6. "Lord Have Mercy"
7. "This Love"
8. "You Ain't Seen Nothing Yet"
9. "Without Thinking"
10. "Yellow Metal Car"
11. "Infected"
12. "Cherry Cherry"
13. "I'm Too Sexy" (Remix)
