= Baby Tuckoo =

English hard rock band

- Genres: Heavy metal, hard rock, arena rock
- Years active: 1982–1986
- Past members: Andy Barrott, Neil Saxton, Paul Smith, Rob Armitage, Tony Sugden

Baby Tuckoo was an English hard rock band, formed in Bradford, West Yorkshire, England in 1982. Their name is taken from the first sentence of the James Joyce novel A Portrait of the Artist as a Young Man. They were generally considered a part of the second generation of new wave of British heavy metal.

They released two albums with Rob Armitage (vocals), Neil Saxton (guitar), Andy Barrott (keyboards, guitar), Paul Smith (bass) and Tony Sugden (drums). Prior to their recording career, Steve Holton (vocals) and Andy Tidswell (keyboards) were in the band.

Armitage left to join Accept in 1987, but was replaced by the American David Reece in 1988 without having taken part in any releases from the band. He later joined the UK outfit Jagged Edge, and founded a band named Passion.

== Discography ==
=== Albums ===
- 1984: First Born (Ultranoise)
- 1986: Force Majeure (Music for Nations)

=== Singles and EPs ===
- 1984: "Mony Mony" (Albion) – single
- 1986: "Rock (Rock)" (Music for Nations) – single and EP
- 1986: "The Tears of a Clown" (Fun After All) – EP (The A-side, a Smokey Robinson & the Miracles cover, was not included on any Baby Tuckoo album)

== See also ==
- List of new wave of British heavy metal bands
