= Sonya Kraus =

German television presenter

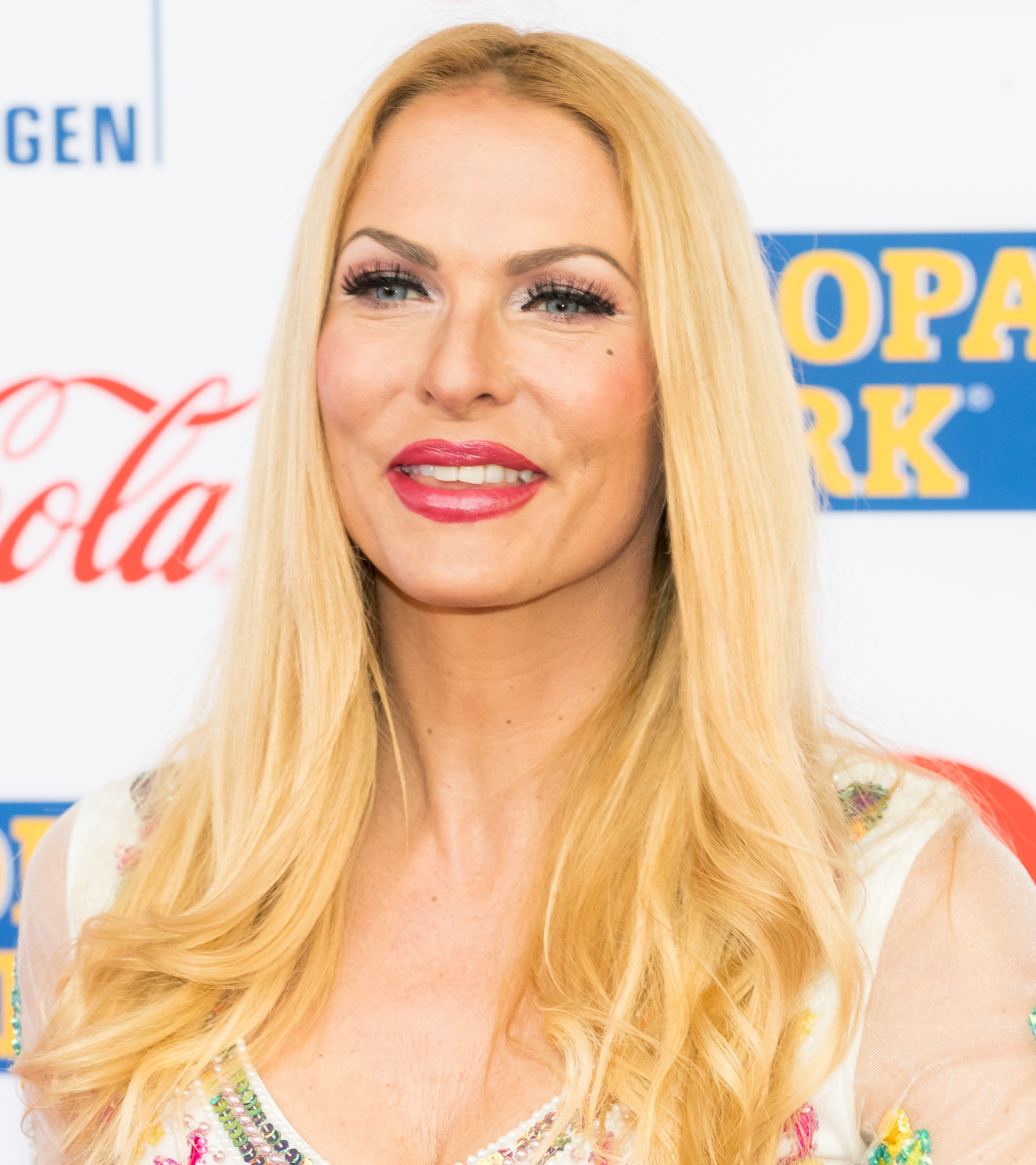
- Kraus in 2019
- Born: 22 June 1973 (age 53); Frankfurt, West Germany
- Occupation: Television presenter

Sonya Kraus (born 22 June 1973) is a German television presenter and former model.

== Biography ==
At age four, Kraus started ballet school which eventually led her to music school in Frankfurt. She ended her ballet career in 1987 when she grew too tall, reaching 1.77m at the time. In 1992, she finished her Abitur (university-entrance diploma) and started working as a professional model until 1994.

Kraus's brother died when she was six years old. Her father, a book-publisher, hanged himself when she was 11. Her mother lost five children during pregnancies and Sonya became her mother's only surviving child.

== Career ==
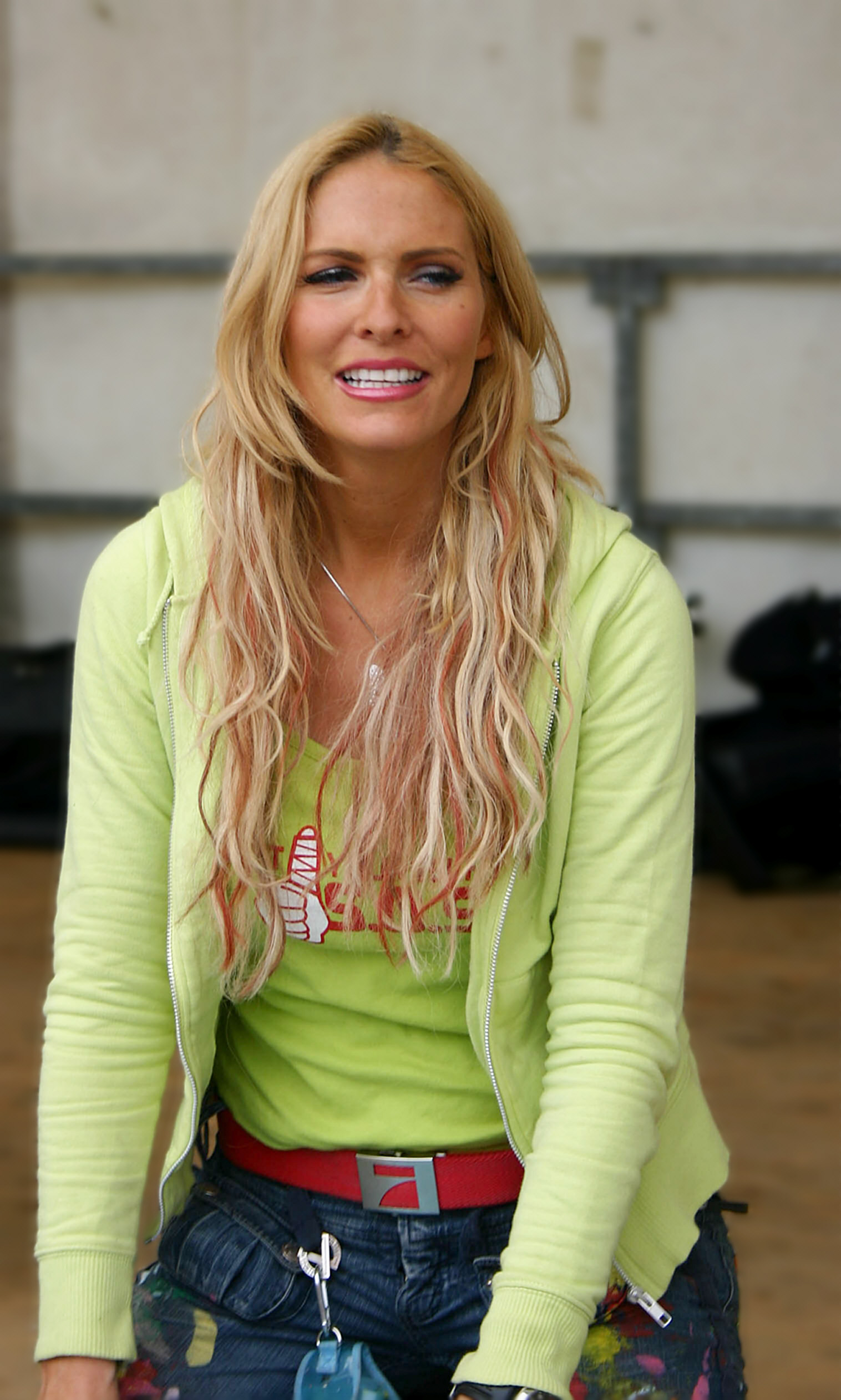
Kraus in 2005

In 1998, she became publicly-known as part of the staff in the television show Glücksrad (the German equivalent of Wheel of Fortune) on Kabel 1, hosted by Frederic Meisner. Since 2000, she has hosted Talk talk talk on ProSieben, a summary of the highlights from talk-shows all over the world. Throughout 2000, she co-hosted Fort Boyard - Stars auf Schatzsuche with Steven Gätjen and Alexander Mazza.

Other shows Kraus has hosted with Mazza include Desert Forges - Stars an ihren Grenzen and Clip-Mix. She was very-active in the ProSieben campaign Red Nose Day.

Since 2003, she has presented the show Do it yourself - S.O.S., re-modeling rooms, houses, and gardens all over Germany. In July 2004, she co-hosted Die Alm with Elton on ProSieben. Between January and February 2005, she and Elton hosted Die Burg.

=== Writing ===
Kraus has written three books:

- Baustelle Mann - Der ultimative Love-Guide (2007)
- Baustelle Body: Sonya's Secrets (2009)
- Wenn das Leben dir eine Zitrone gibt, frag nach Salz und Tequila: Die Sonya-Strategie für Lebensglück, Erfolg und jede Menge Spaß (2011)

=== Trademarks ===
In her shows, Kraus likes to play with her image as a "silly blonde", however, having achieved a straight-A in her Abitur (final exams) along with more eloquent appearances in talk-shows and interviews proves this image to be an act for the benefit of mild entertainment.

Kraus also presents some of her shows barefoot.
