= Stick It Out (Right Said Fred song) =

1993 single by Right Said Fred

Single by Right Said Fred & Hugh & Peter & Alan & Jools & Steve & Clive & Linda & Pauline & Richard & Rob & Basil & Bernard
- Released: February 1993
- Recorded: 1993
- Genre: Dance-pop
- Label: Tug Records
- Songwriters: Richard Fairbrass; Fred Fairbrass; Rob Manzoli
- Producer: Right Said Fred

Right Said Fred singles chronology
"Those Simple Things" / "Daydream" (1992)	"Stick It Out" (1993)	"Bumped" (1993)

Music video
- "Stick It Out" on YouTube

"Stick It Out" is a single released by English pop group Right Said Fred as part of the benefit of Comic Relief 1993 and issued by Gut Records under the Tug label name, with distribution by the Total Record Company. Credited on the label and by the Official Chart Company to "Right Said Fred and Friends", the single's cover has the record credited to "Right Said Fred & Hugh & Peter & Alan & Jools & Steve & Clive & Linda & Pauline & Richard & Rob & Basil & Bernard". This is because the "Friends" included Hugh Laurie, Peter Cook, Alan Freeman, Jools Holland, Steve Coogan, Clive Anderson, Pauline Quirke, Linda Robson, Sir Basil Brush and Bernard Cribbins. "Stick It Out" reached number four on the UK Singles Chart in March 1993, staying in the top 75 for a total of seven weeks, becoming the group's fourth top ten hit in the United Kingdom.

== Charts ==
Chart (1993)	Peak position
Europe (European Hit Radio)	34
UK Singles (OCC)	4
UK Airplay (Music Week)	16

=== Year-end charts ===
Chart (1993)	Position
UK Singles (OCC)	85
