= Stop the World (Right Said Fred album) =

Studio album by Right Said Fred
- Released: 1 May 2011
- Studio: 2Blew Studios, UK, Studio Villas UK, and Underground Studios, Cyprus
- Genre: Pop
- Label: Luv Records
- Producer: Clyde Ward

Right Said Fred chronology
I'm a Celebrity (2009)	Stop the World (2011)	Exactly! (2017)

Stop the World is the eighth studio album by British pop duo Right Said Fred. It was released in 2011, and was followed by the Night of the Living Fred tour.

== Track listing ==
1. "Stop the World"
2. "Julianne"
3. "Raining in England"
4. "Obvious"
5. "Waiting for a Train"
6. "I Ain't Your Guy"
7. "Trouble with Love"
8. "We're All Criminals"
9. "Happily Ever After"
10. "Come Dancing"
11. "Feels Like Love"
12. "Two White Boys"
