= Stand Up (Right Said Fred album) =

Studio album by Right Said Fred
- Released: 26 August 2002
- Length: 44:56
- Label: Kingsize
- Producer: Alex Christensen

Right Said Fred chronology
Fredhead (2001)	Stand Up (2002)	For Sale (2006)

Singles from Stand Up
- 1. "Stand Up (For the Champions)" Released: 2002

Stand Up is the fifth studio album by British pop group Right Said Fred. It was released by Kingsize Records on 26 August 2002. Produced by Alex Christensen, the album debuted at number nine on the German Albums Chart, following the success of their previous album Fredhead in the country. Stand Up'ss lone single "Stand Up (For the Champions)" went on to become a heavily used track at sports events all over the world.

== Critical reception ==
Professional ratings
Review scores
Source	Rating
Allmusic	4/5 stars

AllMusic editor Stephen Schnee rated the album four out of five stars. He wrote: "Taken apart piece by piece, some of the tracks don't measure up to the band's previous album, Fredhead, but as a whole, Stand Up is certainly just as great. And it contains one of the most uplifting, catchy pop songs of the millennium – who could ask for anything more?"

== Track listing ==
1. "Stand Up (For the Champions)"
2. "Bombay Moon"
3. "I Love You But I Don't Like You"
4. "Something in Your Eyes"
5. "Jesus Is a Clubber"
6. "Summertime Fools"
7. "Popsong"
8. "Under a Simpsons' Sky"
9. "Fräulein Wunderbar"
10. "Jubilee"
11. "Night Night"

== Charts ==
Weekly chart performance for Stand Up
Chart (2003)	Peak position
Austrian Albums (Ö3 Austria)	29
German Albums (Offizielle Top 100)	9
