= Skin (British band) =

British hard rock band

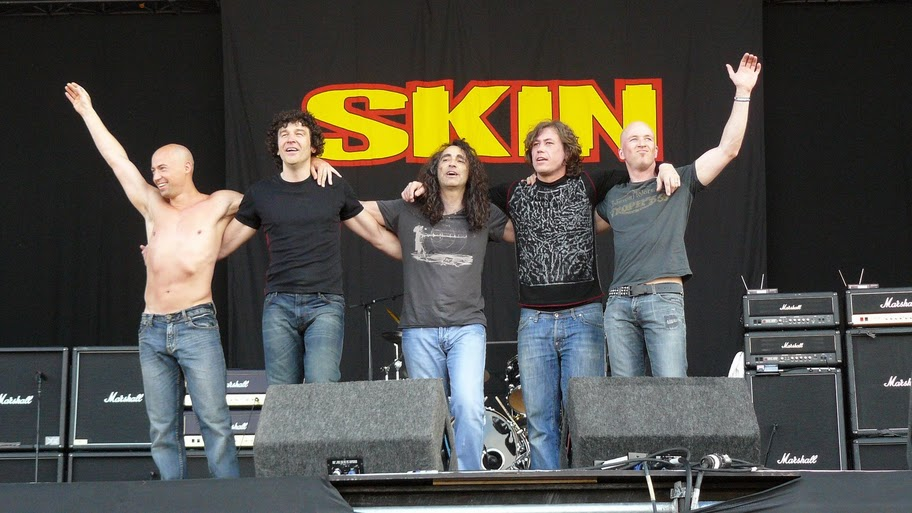
- Skin appearing live at Download Festival, 2009

Background information
- Origin: United Kingdom
- Genres: Hard rock
- Years active: 1992–1998, 2009–2011, 2012–2013
- Labels: Parlophone, Snapper Music
- Past members: Neville MacDonald; Myke Gray; Dicki Fliszar; Andy Robbins; Colin McLeod
- Website: Official Skin website

Skin were a British hard rock band active during the 1990s who reformed in 2009, only to disband again in 2013.

== History ==
Skin were formed in the early 1990s by ex-Jagged Edge members Myke Gray (born 12 May 1968, Fulham, London) and Andy Robbins (also formerly of Tokyo Blade) along with former Kooga vocalist Neville MacDonald (born in Ynysybwl, Pontypridd, Wales) and drummer Dicki Fliszar, formerly of Bruce Dickinson's touring band and band Vamp.

Whilst their first official name was Taste, prior to deciding on a name, Skin first appeared at Westar Studios in 1992 under the name ‘Harry’s Herberts’. The name was a construct by their tour manager Harry Mohan (Sanctuary Music) who made the original booking and when prompted to provide a name for the band just said “book them in as Harry’s Herberts for now”. It wasn’t until some months later and a few names (including Obsession, Bad For Good, and Phoenix) whilst touring small clubs in 1992, that they settled on Skin.

The band showed enough quality on these dates to be offered a management deal with Sanctuary Management, who also handled Iron Maiden and, ultimately, a record deal with Parlophone. Through Iron Maiden vocalist Bruce Dickinson, the band came to the attention of the American record producer Keith Olsen who offered to produce their debut at his 'Goodnight LA' Studio. In 1993, the band flew to Los Angeles and began recording. Once the sessions were finished, the band listened to the finished product and decided more was needed, so another three songs were recorded with Shay Baby producing.

Prior to the release of the album, the band finally decided upon the name Skin (someone had written it down on a wall) and embarked upon a 14 date UK tour supporting Little Angels. Another support tour, this time with Thunder helped swell their growing fan base and, in 1993, they released their debut effort The Skin Up EP. This was followed by House of Love before their first UK chart single "Money", which peaked at no 18. The debut album, entitled Skin sold even better, breaking into the top 10 and peaking at no 9 in the UK Albums Chart. Another single from the album, "Tower of Strength" which was backed with live material from their Donington Monsters of Rock appearance in 1994, also broke into the top 20 and reached no 19 in the UK Singles Chart.

1995 saw Skin consolidating their fan base by recording and releasing Live at the Borderline. A very limited-edition CD of classic rock cover versions, given away free with Kerrang! magazine; only 50 were available, and it has become one of the most prized collector's items among Skin fans, although a Japanese import version was released shortly after. In order to capitalize upon their appearance at Gateshead Stadium supporting Bon Jovi, the band also recorded and released Take Me Down to the River as a double CD along with some of the Borderline cuts. The Bon Jovi appearance marked both a high and a low point in Skin's career. A gig that could have given excellent exposure was marred by a fault with the band's equipment: a stage tech incorrectly installed a voltage converter set to USA settings, which blew Gray's guitar amplifier and McLeod's Hammond organ.

1996 marked the first time touring keyboardist Colin McLeod was featured in promotional artwork and in the music video for the single "Perfect Day". Despite this, Colin was a part-time member as he wanted maintain a funk orientated direction he was continuing at the same time. Neither the second album, Lucky or the two singles, the first being "How Lucky You Are" and "Perfect Day" achieved the chart success of the debut album. The progression of British chart music at this time, along with the lack of backing for rock music in the mainstream media, led to the band being dropped by Parlophone. Despite this, Skin still held a Japanese record contract and the third album Big Fat Slice of Life was finished and released in 1997. Awaiting a UK release, the band released a self-financed two track CD single "Degeneration" that was distributed through the fan club. Later that same year they released their fourth, and final, studio album Experience Electric on Snapper Music. "Experience..." marked a revised version of the Japanese release with several tracks being reworked. "Ride The Blue Wave" evolved into the title track from the album, but "Big Fat Slice..." and "Degeneration" were omitted due to the fan club release. The album went on to top the indie charts at No. 1. During this period, Skin toured relentlessly. The albums was shopped to several American record companies, and met with mogul Jonathan King. Following the culmination of the tour to promote the album, Skin announced they would be embarking on their farewell tour in 1998.

The final Skin concert at the LA2 in London, was recorded and released as a double live album Hasta La Vista, Baby! on Reef Records (a subset of Snapper Music). Since the band's demise, a number of unofficial releases have been issued featuring rare and unreleased tracks. These tracks combined of what would be the fifth UK album, and a large collection of demos that did not make it on the debut. An odd twist of irony was that after the final gig, both Experience Electric and Hasta La Vista, Baby! were released in North America for a limited time, and unknown to the band themselves. Despite this, Skin remained inactive from 1998, until it was announced on 16 March 2009 that Skin would be playing their first live show since 1998 at the Download Festival 2009, UK. Warm up shows in London and Wolverhampton were announced, with Myke and Neville playing an acoustic set at Pontypridd Muni Hall to start it off, almost 11 years to the day that the band split up. The London show quickly sold out and a second London warm up show was added.

After Skin's successful appearance at the Download Festival the band decided to reform properly. A second tour followed later in the year, along with the release of Up Close and Personal an acoustic CD album (featuring reworkings of classic Skin songs and two new tracks "Re-United" and "Redemption"), and Reunited, a DVD of their re-forming. Skin were again asked to play the Download Festival 2010 and played two sets, an acoustic set on the Saturday of the festival and an electric set on the Sunday.

A new studio album Breaking The Silence was released in August 2010 exclusively through the official website to critical acclaim. The band however announced on their website that they would once again disband following a farewell tour in December 2010, though they played their last show at the High Voltage Festival in London, on 23 July 2011, alongside headliners Judas Priest, Dream Theater and Jethro Tull.

Skin reformed once again supporting Little Angels on their 2012 UK tour. In February 2013, it was announced that Skin would play the Download Festival again. They were to perform on the Zippo Encore Stage on Friday 14 June, however it was announced on 28 May 2013 that Neville MacDonald had left the band for 'Personal Reasons' and Dicki Fliszar confirmed on his Facebook page that Skin had permanently disbanded. Myke Gray continued his career as studio musician and songwriter, including co-writing the Right Said Fred hit single You're My Mate, and later became a personal fitness trainer.

== Members ==
- Neville MacDonald – vocals, rhythm guitar (1992–1998, 2009–2011, 2012–2013)
- Myke Gray – lead guitar, backing vocals (1992–1998, 2009–2011, 2012–2013)
- Andy Robbins – bass, backing vocals (not the same Andy Robbins of Holy Soldier) (1992–1998, 2009–2011, 2012–2013)
- Dicki Fliszar – drums, backing vocals (1992–1998, 2009–2011, 2012–2013)
- Colin McLeod – keyboards, synthesizers, organ, piano (1994–1996, 2009–2011, 2012–2013)

== Discography ==
=== Studio albums ===
- Skin (1994) - UK No. 9
- Lucky (1996) - UK No. 38
- Big Fat Slice of Life (1997)
- Experience Electric (1997) - UK No. 72
- Up Close and Personal (2009)
- Breaking the Silence (2010)

=== Live albums ===
- Absolutely Live at the Borderline (1995)
- Hasta la Vista, Baby! (1998)

=== Video albums ===
- A Big Fat Slice of Live (1998)
- Skin Reunited (2009)
- Alive & Kicking (2010)

=== EPs ===
- The Skin Up (1993) - UK No. 67
- The Money (1994) - UK No. 18
- Look But Don't Touch (1993) - UK No. 33
- Redemption (2010)

=== Singles ===
- "Elected" (1992) - feat. Rowan Atkinson and Bruce Dickinson - UK No. 9
- "House of Love" (1994) - UK No. 45
- "Tower of Strength" (1994) - UK No. 19
- "Take Me Down to the River" (1995) - UK No. 26
- "How Lucky You Are" (1996) - UK No. 32
- "Perfect Day" (1996) - UK No. 33
- "Degeneration" (1998)
- "Stronger" (2010)

=== Fanclub albums ===
- For Your Ears Only (1998)
- Skinny Dipping (1999)
- Lost and Found (1999)
