= Right Said Fred =

English pop act

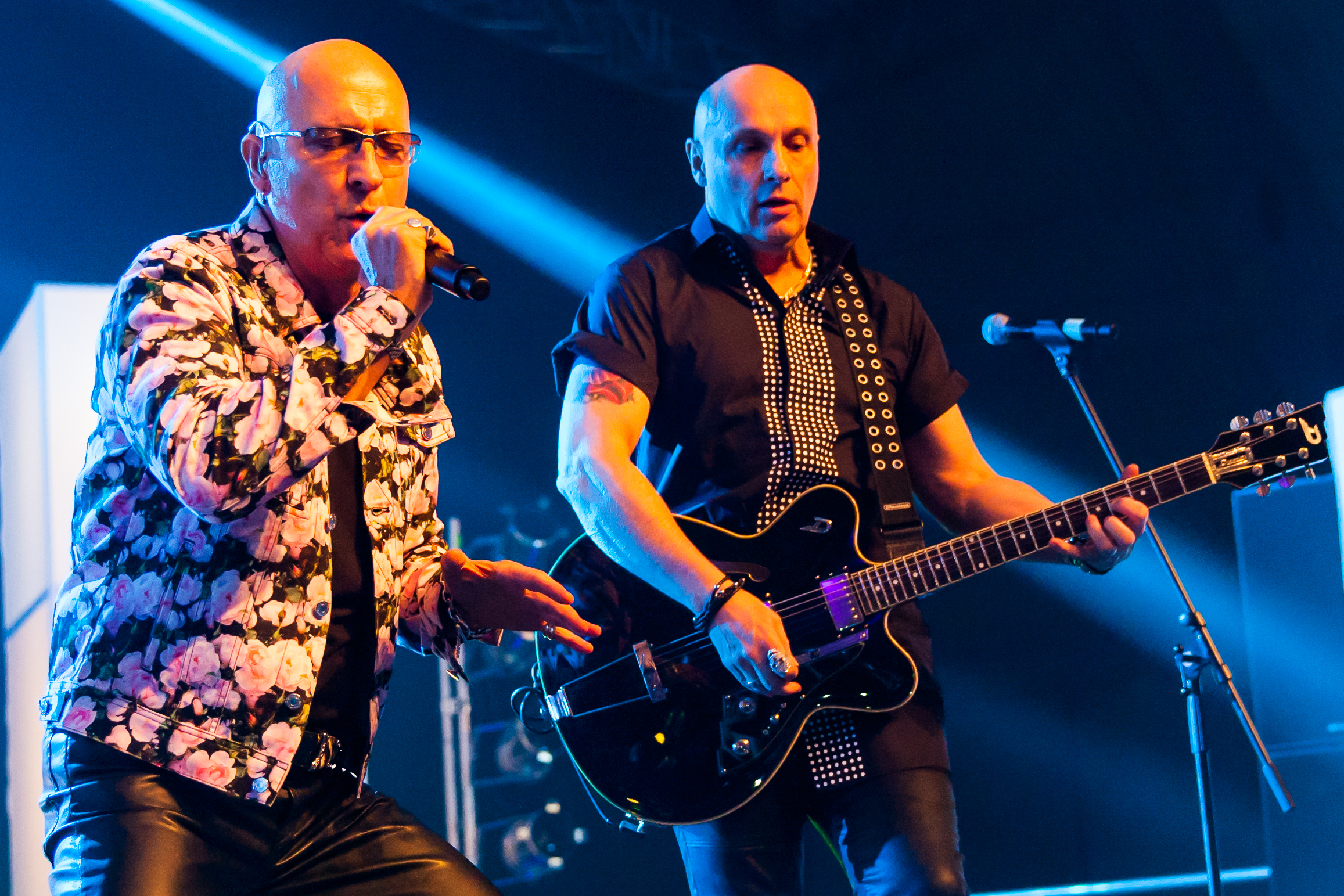
- Right Said Fred in March 2015 at the RPR1 '90s Festival in Mannheim, Germany

Background information
- Origin: East Grinstead, England
- Genres: Pop; Europop; dance-pop
- Years active: 1989–present
- Labels: Charisma; Tug; Kingsize
- Members: Fred Fairbrass; Richard Fairbrass
- Past members: Ray Weston; Dan Kruse; Rob Timms; Rob Manzoli
- Website: rightsaidfred.com

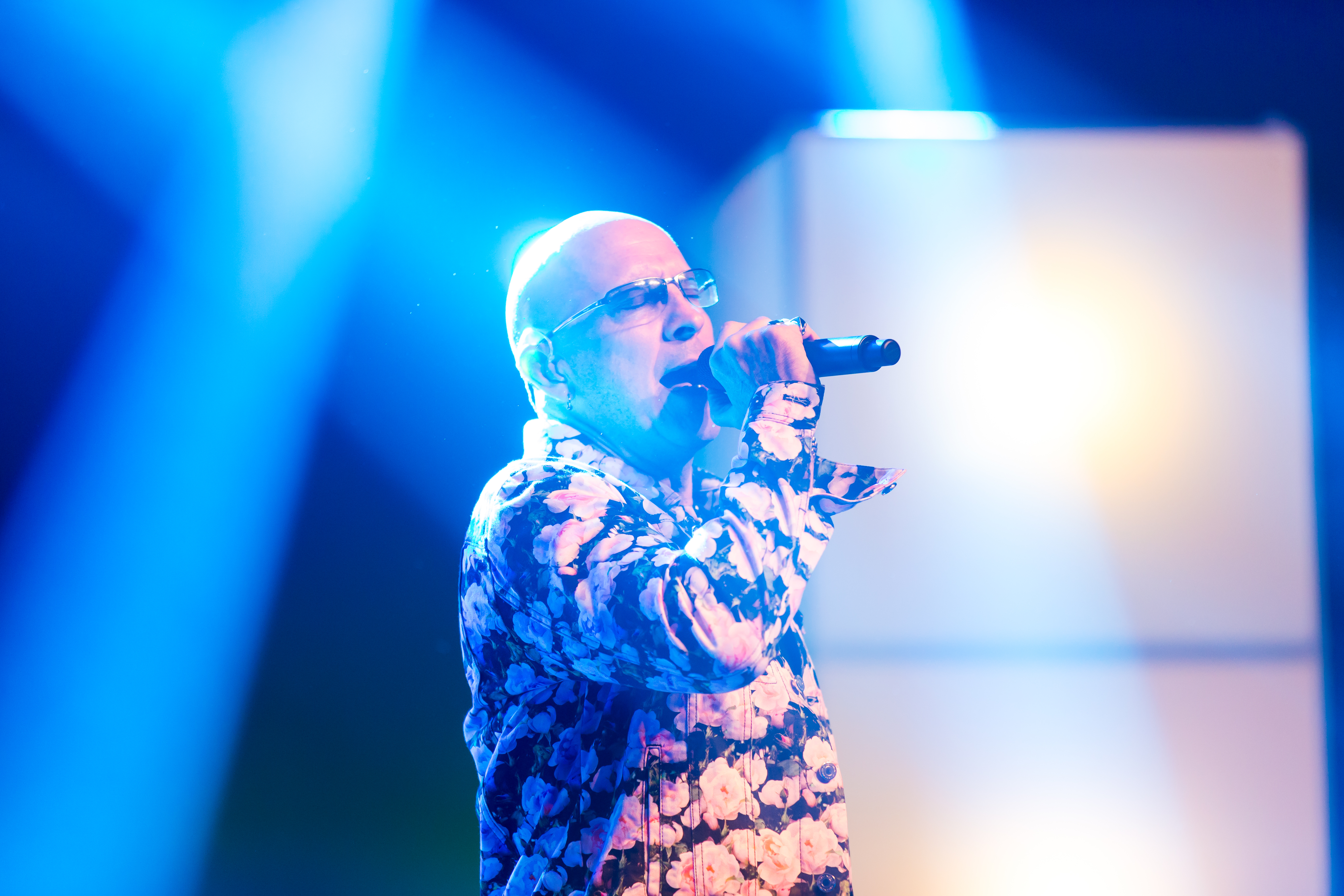
Richard Fairbrass (March 2015)

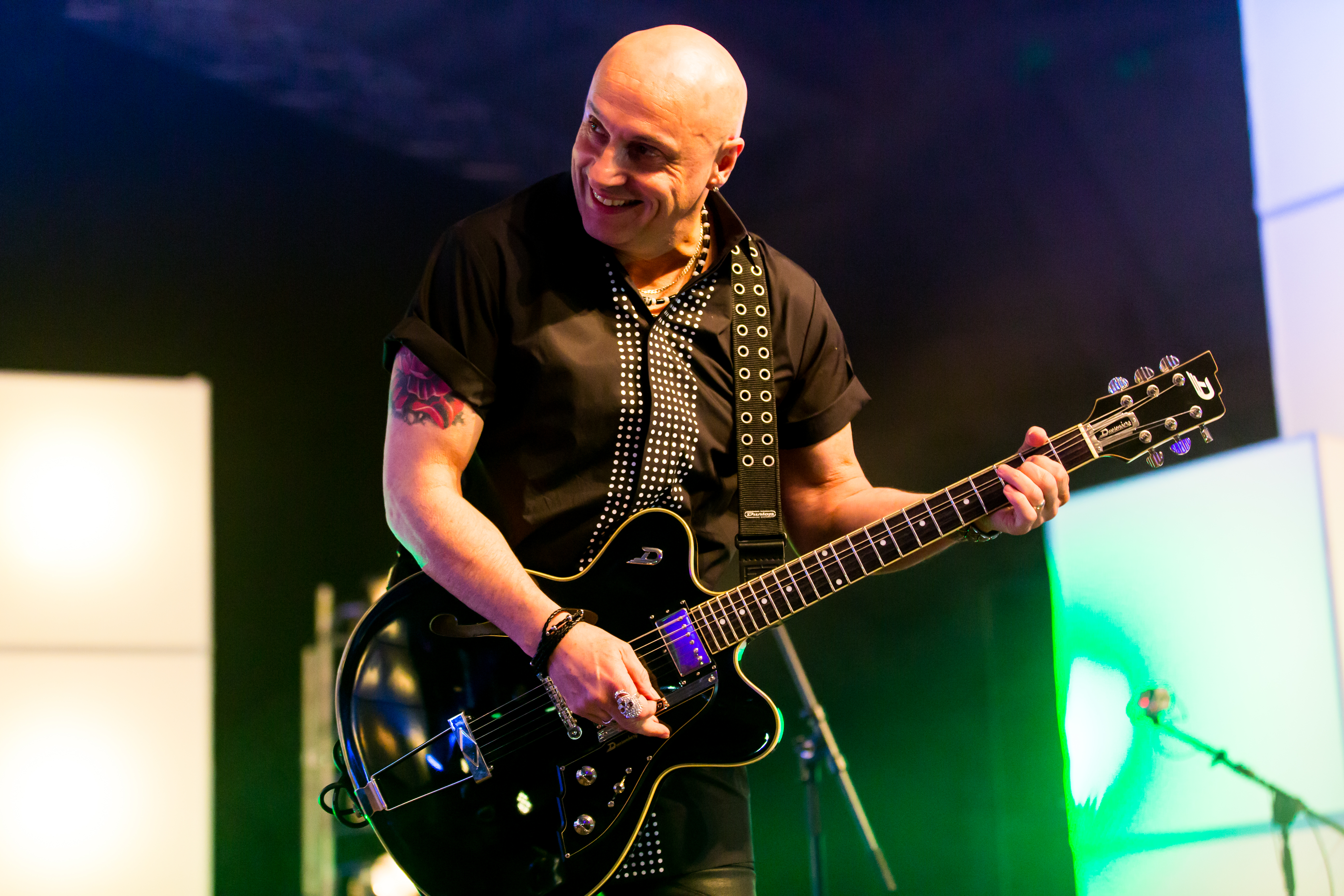
Fred Fairbrass (March 2015)

Right Said Fred are an English pop group formed by brothers Fred and Richard Fairbrass in 1989. They are best known for the hit 1991 song "I'm Too Sexy".

== History ==
=== 1989–1991: Formation ===
The Fairbrass brothers had been playing music professionally since the mid-1970s: as part of a band called the Actors, the brothers had toured with Suicide and supported Joy Division at the Factory club in Manchester. Richard was employed as a session bassist for artists including Boy George, Mick Jagger, and David Bowie, and appeared as the bass guitarist in Bowie's short film Jazzin' for Blue Jean. In 1987, Fred appeared as a guitarist in the Bob Dylan vehicle Hearts of Fire.

The Fairbrass brothers formed the group in 1989, with Richard on lead vocals and bass and Fred on guitar. They were named after the novelty song "Right Said Fred", which was a hit single for singer and actor Bernard Cribbins in 1962. The Fairbrass brothers were originally accompanied by drummer Ray Weston and guitarist Dan Kruse. Weston left in 1990 to join the progressive rock group Wishbone Ash, and Kruse left the next year. Guitarist Rob Manzoli joined in 1990 and remained with the group until 1997.

=== 1991–1992: "I'm Too Sexy" and Up ===
In July 1991, the group released its debut single and best-known song, "I'm Too Sexy", on the independent London-based record label Tug Records. The Fairbrass brothers have stated that the song's lyrics are centred on certain users of the gym they owned in London, who they claimed had no shame. "A lot of models used our gym, so we thought it was time to start poking [fun] at them," Fred stated.

The song was a considerable hit in the United Kingdom, spending six weeks at number two on the charts behind Bryan Adams' "(Everything I Do) I Do It for You" and three months in the Top 10. The song also went to number one in 32 countries, including the United States, where it topped the Billboard Hot 100 chart. The song earned the band a nomination for an Ivor Novello award. "I'm Too Sexy" has subsequently been used in over 40 television shows and movies, including My Wife and Kids, The Simpsons, The West Wing, and EastEnders.

Their second single, "Don't Talk Just Kiss", with background vocals by soul singer Jocelyn Brown, was released in October 1991. It made number 3 on the United Kingdom Christmas charts, entered the top five in many countries, and reached number eight on the United States dance chart. In February 1992, the band released its third single, "Deeply Dippy". This was number one in the United Kingdom for three weeks and peaked at number nine on the United States dance chart.

The success of the singles resulted in the band's multi-platinum debut album, Up, reaching number one on the United Kingdom album charts as well as charting worldwide. The album remained in the Top 40 for almost a year. In Germany, a fifth single, "Love For All Seasons", charted at number 65 in 1993.

In 1992, Heavenly Records released an EP that featured the label's acts covering Right Said Fred songs for charity. The Fred EP includes Saint Etienne (performing "I'm Too Sexy"), The Rockingbirds ("Deeply Dippy"), and Flowered Up ("Don't Talk Just Kiss").

=== Remainder of the 1990s ===
==== 1993–1994: Sex and Travel ====
Early in 1993 Fred, Richard, and Rob wrote and recorded the Comic Relief single "Stick It Out", which was a top-five hit in the United Kingdom and in many European countries. In September 1993 they released their second album, Sex and Travel, which included the singles, "Bumped" and "Hands Up (for Lovers)". The band received its second Ivor Novello award for "Deeply Dippy" in 1993.

==== 1995–1996: Smashing! ====
Right Said Fred parted company with Tug Records and then released their third album Smashing! in 1996 on the band's own label Happy Valley Records. It included the singles, "Living on a Dream", "Big Time", and "Everybody Loves Me".

==== 1997–2001: Manzoli leaves, "You're My Mate" and Fredhead ====
Rob Manzoli parted with the band in 1997. In 1998, Fred and Richard set up their own recording studio in London and started writing and recording what became the album Fredhead.

In 2000, Right Said Fred signed to Kingsize/BMG Berlin in Germany. The first single from Fredhead was "You're My Mate" (co-written with hard rock guitarist Myke Gray). Other singles from Fredhead were "Mojive" (written by Ninfa, Ena, Klein, Frame) and "Love Song" (Agostino Carollo).

=== 21st century ===
==== 2002–2006: Stand Up and For Sale ====
The second Kingsize/BMG album Stand Up was released in 2002. The lead single was "Stand Up (For the Champions)", composed by Clyde Ward and the Fairbrass brothers.

Due to family ill-health, Fred and Richard took some time out from travelling to write and record the single "We Are the Freds" and the album For Sale for the Ministry of Sound. In late 2004, Right Said Fred toured extensively in Europe.

==== 2007–2012: I'm a Celebrity and Sexaholic ====
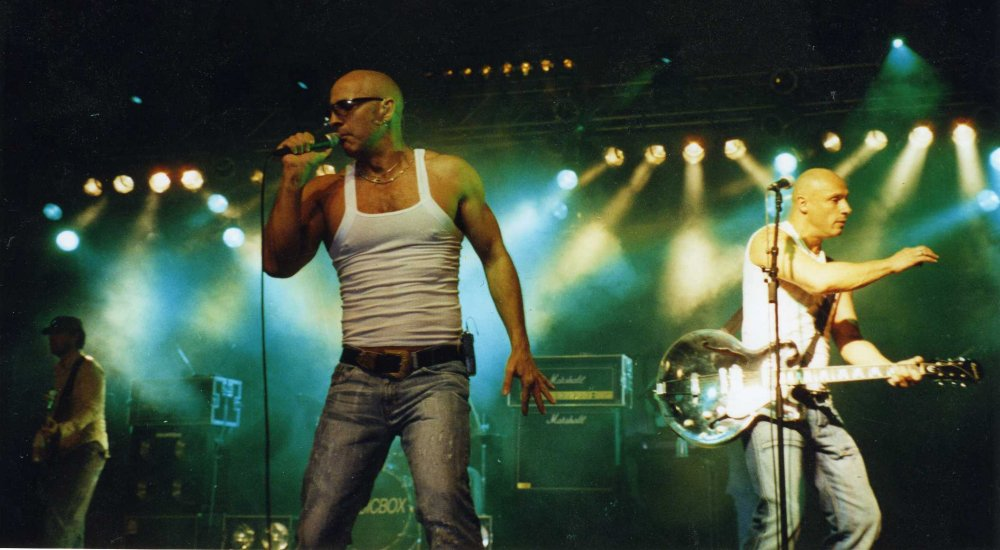
Germany 2009

During 2007 and 2008, Fred and Richard collaborated with Clyde Ward to write and record their sixth album I'm a Celebrity. The album was produced by Ward, and for the United States release, Right Said Fred worked with David Levine at Promark Music. In late July 2009, Right Said Fred released "Sexy Bum" in Germany, the first single from the band's HITS! album. The band toured in support of the album in the United Kingdom and continental Europe.

The band collaborated with Norwegian writers/producers Dsign Music to record Sexaholic, released in 2011.

==== 2013–present ====
Richard spoke at an Oxford Union debate. TV appearances included an acoustic performance on the UK's Celebrity Big Brother TV show.

RSF began writing and recording new tracks with Paul Statham (who had previously worked with artists such as Dido, Jim Kerr, Kylie Minogue, The Saturdays). The band released the single "Sweet Treats" in January 2017 from the album Exactly! In August 2017, Richard and Fred were credited as songwriters on the Taylor Swift single "Look What You Made Me Do" alongside Jack Antonoff and Swift herself. The song's chorus is an interpolation of the famous chorus from "I'm Too Sexy".

In May 2022, Phoenix Music International released the band's single "Godsend", dubbing the duo the 'UK's most controversial band' after a number of anti-COVID-19 vaccine-themed Twitter posts and appearances in the press during the UK pandemic lockdowns. In 2022 they were involved in leafletting for British anti-climate change activist group, Not Our Future, in Oxford.

== Awards and nominations ==
Award	Year	Nominee(s)	Category	Result	Ref.
BMI London Awards	2018	"Look What You Made Me Do"	Award-Winning Songs	Won	
BMI London Awards	2022	"Way 2 Sexy"	Award-Winning Songs	Won	
BMI London Awards	2025	"Alien Superstar"	Award-Winning Songs	Won	
BMI Pop Awards	1993	"I'm Too Sexy"	College Award	Won	
BMI Pop Awards	2019	"Look What You Made Me Do"	Award-Winning Song	Won	
Brit Awards	1993	Themselves	British Group	Nominated	
Brit Awards	1993	Up	British Album of the Year	Nominated	
Ivor Novello Awards	1992	"I'm Too Sexy"	The Best Selling 'A' Side	Nominated	
Ivor Novello Awards	1992	"I'm Too Sexy"	Most Performed Work	Won	
Ivor Novello Awards	1993	"Deeply Dippy"	Most Performed Work	Won	
Silver Clef Awards	1992	Themselves	Best Newcomer	Won	

== Discography ==
=== Studio albums ===
Title	Details	Peak chart positions									Certifications (sales threshold)
Title	Details	UK	AUS	AUT	GER	NL	NZ	SWE	SWI	US	Certifications (sales threshold)
Up	Release date: 16 March 1992; Label: Tug; Formats: Vinyl, CD, cassette	1	39	1	8	9	23	16	22	46	BPI: 2× Platinum; MC: Platinum; RIAA: Gold
Sex and Travel	Release date: 1 November 1993; Label: EMI; Formats: CD, cassette	35	145	35	88	91	—	—	—	—	
Smashing!	Release date: 1996; Label: Happy Valley; Formats: CD, cassette	—	—	—	—	—	—	—	—	—	
Fredhead	Release date: 23 October 2001; Label: Sony BMG; Formats: CD, cassette	—	—	4	2	—	—	—	75	—	
Stand Up	Release date: 26 August 2002; Label: Kingsize; Formats: CD, cassette	—	—	29	9	—	—	—	—	—	
For Sale	Release date: 23 January 2006; Label: Ministry of Sound; Formats: CD, music download	—	—	—	61	—	—	—	—	—	
I'm a Celebrity	Release date: 14 October 2008; Label: Promark Music; Formats: CD, music download	—	—	—	—	—	—	—	—	—	
Stop the World	Release date: 1 May 2011; Label: Luv; Formats: CD, music download	—	—	—	—	—	—	—	—	—	
Exactly!	Release date: 24 February 2017; Label: PMI Digital; Formats: CD, vinyl, music download	—	—	—	—	—	—	—	—	—	
"—" denotes releases that did not chart

=== Compilation albums ===
Title	Details
Greatest Hits	Release date: 23 December 2003; Label: Hansa; Formats: CD, cassette
Hits!	Release date: 2009; Label: Sexy Records, EMI; Formats: CD, music download
The Singles	Scheduled: 2 June 2023; Label: Sexy Records, EMI; Formats: CD, 2×LP, music download
Singles (The Original Hits)	Release date: 9 January 2024; Label: Sexy Records; Formats: music download

=== Singles ===
Year	Single	Peak chart positions										Certifications (sales threshold)	Album
Year	Single	UK	AUS	AUT	BEL (FLA)	GER	IRE	NL	NZ	US	US Dance	Certifications (sales threshold)	Album
1991	"I'm Too Sexy"	2	1	1	3	14	1	19	1	1	4	BPI: Gold; ARIA: Platinum; MC: Gold; RIAA: Platinum	Up
1991	"Don't Talk Just Kiss"	3	18	5	11	2	8	3	16	76	8		Up
1992	"Deeply Dippy"	1	38	6	14	15	1	9	11	—	9	BPI: Silver	Up
1992	"Those Simple Things/Daydream"	29	121	29	27	48	21	23	—	—	—		Up
1993	"Stick It Out"	4	—	—	—	—	—	—	—	—	—		Single only
1993	"Bumped"	32	88	—	25	54	—	37	29	—	—		Sex and Travel
1993	"Hands Up (4 Lovers)"	60	176	—	—	82	—	—	—	—	—		Sex and Travel
1994	"Wonderman"	55	—	—	50	—	—	—	—	—	—		Sex and Travel
1995	"Living on a Dream"	91	147	—	17	66	—	—	—	—	—		Smashing!
1996	"Everybody Loves Me"	—	187	—	—	74	—	—	—	—	—		Smashing!
1996	"Big Time"	77	—	—	53	—	—	—	—	—	—		Smashing!
2001	"Mojive"	—	—	35	—	46	—	—	—	—	—		Fredhead
2001	"You're My Mate"	18	101	4	—	6	—	—	43	—	—		Fredhead
2002	"Love Song"	—	—	—	—	21	—	—	—	—	—		Fredhead
2002	"Stand Up (For the Champions)"	—	—	—	—	14	—	—	—	—	—		Stand Up
2002	"I Love You (But I Don't Like You)"	—	—	—	—	61	—	—	—	—	—		Stand Up
2003	"We Are the Freds"	—	—	—	—	68	—	—	—	—	—		—
2003	"We Are the Champs"	—	—	—	—	92	—	—	—	—	—		—
2004	"The Wizard" (vs. Doris Dubinski)	—	—	—	—	52	—	—	—	—	—		Der Wixxer OST
2006	"Where Do You Go to My Lovely?"	—	—	40	—	36	—	—	—	—	—		For Sale
2007	"I'm Too Sexy" (re-release)	56	—	—	—	—	—	—	—	—	—		—
2008	"I'm a Celebrity"	—	—	—	—	—	—	—	—	—	—		I'm a Celebrity
2009	"Sexy Bum"	—	—	—	—	—	—	—	—	—	—		Hits
2009	"Right on the Kisser"	—	—	—	—	—	—	—	—	—	—		Hits
2010	"Viva Südafrika" (Höhner featuring Right Said Fred)	—	—	—	—	54	—	—	—	—	—		—
2017	"Sweet Treats"	—	—	—	—	—	—	—	—	—	—		Exactly!
"—" denotes releases that did not chart

=== Music videos ===
List of music videos, showing year released and directors
Title	Year	Director
"I'm Too Sexy"	1991	James Lebon
"Don't Talk Just Kiss"	1991	James Lebon
"Deeply Dippy"	1992	Frank Sacramento
"Those Simple Things"	1992	N/A
"What A Day for a Daydream"	1992	James Lebon
"Love for All Seasons"	1992	James Lebon
"Bumped"	1993	Marcus Nispel
"Hands Up (4 Lovers)"	1993	Paul Boyd
"Wonderman"	1994	N/A
"Living on a Dream"	1995	James Lebon
"Everybody Loves Me"	1996	N/A
"Mojive"	2001	David Incorvaia
"You're My Mate"	2001	N/A
"Love Song"	2001	Bernard Wedig
"Stand Up (For the Champions)"	2002	N/A
"I Love You"	2002	Wolf Gresenz
"We Are the Freds"	2004	Bernd Possardt & Jeff Lisk
"Where Do You Go to My Lovely?"	2006	N/A
"I'm a Celebrity"	2008	Robert Madrid
