= I'm Too Sexy =

1991 single by Right Said Fred

Single by Right Said Fred

from the album Up
- Released: 15 July 1991
- Genre: Dance-pop; Eurodance; novelty
- Length: 2:50
- Label: Tug (UK); Charisma (US)
- Songwriters: Fred Fairbrass; Richard Fairbrass; Rob Manzoli
- Producer: TommyD

Right Said Fred singles chronology
| "I'm Too Sexy" (1991) | "Don't Talk Just Kiss" (1991) |

Right Said Fred singles chronology
| "Where Do You Go to My Love?" (2006) | "I'm Too Sexy 2007" (2007) | "I'm a Celebrity" (2008) |

Music video
- "I'm Too Sexy" on YouTube

"I'm Too Sexy" is a novelty song by English pop band Right Said Fred, released in July 1991 by Tug Records as their debut single from their first album, Up (1992). The song was written by band members and brothers Fred Fairbrass and Richard Fairbrass with Rob Manzoli, and produced by TommyD. It peaked at number two on the UK Singles Chart while topping the charts in seven other countries, including the United States, Australia, Canada and Ireland. James Lebon directed the music video for the song, featuring various clips of models walking on a catwalk.

== Composition and recording ==
The idea for the song came about when the Fairbrass brothers were running a gym in London where, according to Richard, there was "lots of narcissism and posing". One day, he took his shirt off and started singing "I'm too sexy for my shirt" in front of a mirror as a joke. The band originally recorded it as an indie rock song.

It was rejected by multiple record companies before they played it to radio plugger Guy Holmes. He was initially unimpressed after playing it on his car stereo, but his passengers latched on to the song's "I'm a model, you know what I mean" hook, and Holmes asked the band if they could rework it as a dance track.

DJ TommyD, an acquaintance of Richard Fairbrass, programmed electronics around the original vocal, whilst guitarist Rob Manzoli added a riff borrowed from the Jimi Hendrix song "Third Stone from the Sun".

== Release ==
The single was released on 15 July 1991. It equalled the record for the most consecutive weeks at number two on the UK Singles Chart without ever topping the chart, staying at number two for six weeks in a row while held back by Bryan Adams' "(Everything I Do) I Do It for You" (this equalled the previous record set by Father Abraham's 1978 hit "The Smurf Song").

In May 1992, the song was nominated for an Ivor Novello Award for Best Selling 'A' Side. "I'm Too Sexy" was the act's first of several hits, particularly in the United Kingdom. They went on to have a number-one single on the UK Singles Chart with "Deeply Dippy" in April 1992.

== Chart performance ==
"I'm Too Sexy" was successful on the singles charts worldwide, becoming a hit on several continents. It made its way to the number-one position in Australia, Austria, Canada (The Record chart), Ireland, Luxembourg, New Zealand, and the U.S., where the single topped the Billboard Hot 100 as well as the Billboard Hot Dance Music/Maxi-Singles Sales chart. The song reached the next best chart position at number two in Canada (the RPM Top Singles chart), Israel, Norway, and the UK, where it peaked in its fourth week on the UK Singles Chart on August 11, 1991. It debuted on the UK chart at number 37 and was held off the number-one spot by Bryan Adams' "(Everything I Do) I Do It for You". "I'm Too Sexy" spent six weeks at #2 before dropping to #5, #7, and #9, and then leaving the UK Top 10 in October 1991. In the U.S., the song peaked at #4 on both the Billboard Hot Dance Club Play chart and the Cash Box Top 100, as well as at #28 on the Billboard Modern Rock Tracks chart. Additionally, it was a top-10 hit in Belgium (#3), Ecuador (#5), Greece (#5) and Sweden (#8).

"I'm Too Sexy" was certified gold in Australia (70,000 copies sold), Austria (25,000), Canada (50,000), New Zealand (5,000), and the UK (470,000). In the U.S., the single received platinum status with a sale of 1 million units.

== Critical reception ==
AllMusic editor Stephen Schnee described the song as a "humorous yet misunderstood swipe at self-centered male bodybuilders and models." J.D. Considine from The Baltimore Sun wrote, "With its prodding piano and insistently tuneful bass line, 'I'm Too Sexy' is an insidiously catchy single - the sort that sticks in your memory whether you want it to or not. Fortunately, head Fred Richard Fairbrass handles the vocals with enough good humor that the single's annoyance factor remains relatively low. David Taylor-Wilson from Bay Area Reporter called it "a campy send-up of the fashion world." Larry Flick from Billboard magazine commented, "Thoroughly fun and goofy ditty recently heated up international dance floors and radio airwaves. Fred cheekily boasts about his physical attributes over a festive pop/house groove, which should have no trouble duplicating its success here." Andy Kastanas from The Charlotte Observer stated, "This midtempo "techno/house" beat has a catchy hook and unusual, deep male vocals (à la Elmer Fudd on steroids) that'll put a meltdown on any ladies in the vicinity. You'll dance whether you like it or not, and the lyrics are sure to give you some chucks when you sing along (and you WILL sing along)... "I'm too sexy for my car, too sexy for your party, too sexy for this song, too sexy it hurts" and on and on."

British magazine Music Week deemed it an "eccentric" and "amusingly muttered 121.7bpm pop rattler". Clark and Devaney from Cashbox said, "Here is a fun, tongue-in-cheek dance tune that should get lots of club play." They concluded that the group "have put together a clever dance/club put-down of what could only be the whole fashion-model "poser" attitude that's so much in vogue." David Quantick from New Musical Express stated, "'I'm Too Sexy' is a great record, not least because it's a piss-take of people who fancy themselves sung by people who fancy themselves." A reviewer from People Magazine described it as a "dopey dance tune mocking fashion models and voguers—but it'll keep you moving." Spin wrote, "This 12-inch, along with its video, is the most inescapable assault on mass consciousness since 'Gypsy Woman'. Prepare to be impaled on a throbbing slice of masculinity courtesy of three roughnecks who've already had Mick Jagger down on all fours (they were once his trainers). Lie back and enjoy it."

== Music video ==
A music video was produced to promote the single, directed by James Lebon. In a 2017 interview, Fred Fairbrass told that they had borrowed £1,500 to make the single and then another £3,000-£4,000 to make the video. In it, the group performs while humorously posing as models on a runway set, surrounded by female photographers wearing bikinis. In between, there are clips of real models walking the catwalk at different fashion shows. James Muretich from Calgary Herald described the video as "campy". In the clubs, many people would imitate the band's "catwalk" dance as seen on the video, which was released in January 1992.

== Impact and legacy ==
NME ranked "I'm Too Sexy" number 15 in their list of "Singles of the Year" in December 1991. In 1993, the song was awarded one of BMI's Pop Awards in the category for Most Performed College Radio Song of 1992. In June 2007, it was voted No. 80 on VH1's list of "100 Greatest Songs of the '90s". In April 2008, the song was rated No. 49 on "The 50 Worst Songs Ever! Watch, Listen and Cringe!" by Blender. In April 2011, it was voted No. 2 on VH1's "40 Greatest One-Hit Wonders of the '90s". In 2017, BuzzFeed ranked it No. 90 in their list of "The 101 Greatest Dance Songs of the '90s", adding, "Yes, this song is cheesy as hell, but it doesn't ever try to be anything other than what it is: a fun, catchy, campy dance song." In 2019, Billboard magazine listed the song at No. 210 in their ranking of "Billboard's Top Songs of the '90s". Four years later, in October 2023, the magazine ranked it at No. 475 in their "Best Pop Songs of All Time" list.

== Track listing ==
- UK 7" (SNOG 1) / cassette (CA SNOG 1)
1. "I'm Too Sexy"
2. "I'm Too Sexy" (instrumental)
- UK 12" (12 SNOG 1)
1. "I'm Too Sexy"
2. "I'm Too Sexy" (7" version)
3. "I'm Too Sexy" (12" instrumental)
- UK CD (CD SNOG 1)
1. "I'm Too Sexy" (Betty's mix)
2. "I'm Too Sexy" (7" mix)
3. "I'm Too Sexy" (12" instrumental)
4. "I'm Too Sexy" (Italian version)
- US single
1. "I'm Too Sexy" (7" version)
2. "I'm Too Sexy" (Extended Club Mix)
3. "I'm Too Sexy" (Betty's Mix)
4. "I'm Too Sexy" (Instrumental)
5. "I'm Too Sexy" (Catwalk Mix)
6. "I'm Too Sexy" (Tushapella)
7. "I'm Too Sexy" (Spanish version)

== Charts ==
=== Weekly charts ===
| Chart (1991–1992) | Peak position |
|---|---|
| Australia (ARIA) | 1 |
| Austria (Ö3 Austria Top 40) | 1 |
| Belgium (Ultratop 50 Flanders) | 3 |
| Canada Top Singles (RPM) | 2 |
| Canada Dance/Urban (RPM) | 1 |
| Canada (The Record) | 1 |
| Ecuador (El Siglo de Torreón) | 5 |
| Europe (European Hit Radio) | 21 |
| Finland (Suomen virallinen lista) | 15 |
| Germany (GfK) | 14 |
| Greece (IFPI) | 5 |
| Ireland (IRMA) | 1 |
| Israel (Israeli Singles Chart) | 2 |
| Luxembourg (Radio Luxembourg) | 1 |
| Netherlands (Dutch Top 40) | 20 |
| Netherlands (Single Top 100) | 19 |
| New Zealand (Recorded Music NZ) | 1 |
| Norway (VG-lista) | 2 |
| Sweden (Sverigetopplistan) | 8 |
| UK Singles (Official Charts) | 2 |
| UK Airplay (Music Week) | 15 |
| UK Dance (Music Week) | 27 |
| US Billboard Hot 100 | 1 |
| US Hot Dance Club Play (Billboard) | 4 |
| US Hot Dance Music/Maxi-Singles Sales (Billboard) | 1 |
| US Modern Rock Tracks (Billboard) | 28 |
| US Cash Box Top 100 | 4 |

| Chart (2007) | Peak position |
|---|---|
| UK Singles (Official Charts) | 56 |

=== Year-end charts ===
| Chart (1991) | Rank |
|---|---|
| Australia (ARIA) | 13 |
| Belgium (Ultratop 50 Flanders) | 28 |
| New Zealand (Recorded Music NZ) | 23 |
| UK Singles (OCC) | 4 |

| Chart (1992) | Rank |
|---|---|
| Austria (Ö3 Austria Top 40) | 12 |
| Brazil (Crowley) | 9 |
| Canada Top Singles (RPM) | 44 |
| New Zealand (Recorded Music NZ) | 31 |
| US Billboard Hot 100 | 13 |

=== Decade-end charts ===
Decade-end chart performance for "I'm Too Sexy"
| Chart (1990–1999) | Rank |
|---|---|
| Austria (Ö3 Austria Top 40) | 27 |
| Canada (Nielsen SoundScan) | 67 |
| US Billboard Hot 100 | 79 |

== Certifications and sales ==
| Region | Certification | Certified units/sales |
|---|---|---|
| Australia (ARIA) | Platinum | 70,000^{^} |
| Austria (IFPI Austria) | Gold | 25,000^{*} |
| Canada (Music Canada) | Gold | 50,000^{^} |
| New Zealand (RMNZ) | Gold | 5,000^{*} |
| United Kingdom (BPI) | Gold | 470,000 |
| United States (RIAA) | Platinum | 1,000,000^{^} |
^{*} Sales figures based on certification alone.^{^} Shipments figures based on certification alone.

== Covers and adaptations ==
- In 2009, English girl group Sugababes included an interpolation of the song in their single "Get Sexy".
- In 2016, Cody Marshall released a sequel to "Weird Al" Yankovic's "Achy Breaky Song" titled "I'm Too Sexy Song." In the song, Cody describes his annoyance with "I'm Too Sexy" and his preference for listening to Yanni play the flute and country music by artists such as Collin Raye, Alabama, Brooks & Dunn, Alan Jackson, Travis Tritt, Lonestar, Ricochet, Faith Hill, Sawyer Brown, Chad Brock, Toby Keith, and Tim McGraw.
- In 2017, American singer-songwriter Taylor Swift released her single "Look What You Made Me Do", which interpolated "I'm Too Sexy" in the chorus. It marked Swift's fifth chart topper on the Billboard Hot 100.
- In 2021, Canadian rapper Drake released the song "Way 2 Sexy" with American rappers Future and Young Thug, which samples and interpolates the track. The song also topped the Hot 100.
- In 2022, American singer Beyoncé released the song "Alien Superstar" as part of her seventh studio album Renaissance, which interpolates the track.
- In 2026, American rapper Sk8star interpolated the song on his 2026 track "2 Sexy".

== See also ==
- Billboard Year-End Hot 100 singles of 1992
- List of number-one singles in Australia during the 1990s
- List of Top 25 singles for 1991 in Australia
- List of number-one hits of 1992 (Austria)
- List of Billboard Hot 100 number-one singles of 1992
- List of Billboard Hot 100 top 10 singles in 1992
- List of number-one singles of 1991 (Ireland)
- List of number-one singles from the 1990s (New Zealand)
- List of RPM number-one dance singles of 1992
