= Richard Fairbrass =

British singer (born 1953)

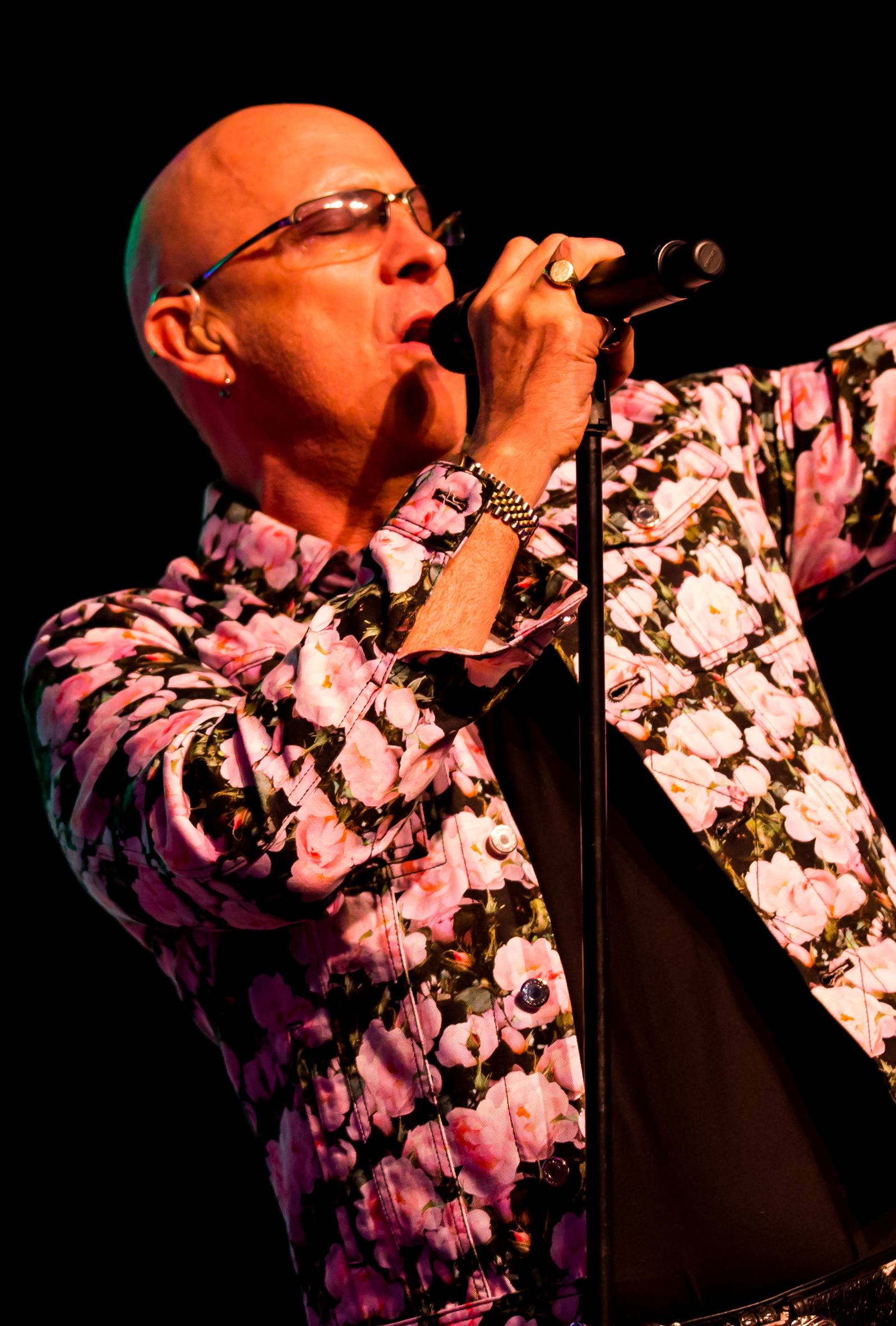
- Fairbrass performing in 2015

Background information
- Born: Richard Peter John Fairbrass; 22 September 1953 (age 72); Kingston upon Thames, Greater London, England
- Genres: Pop; dance
- Occupations: Singer; musician; television presenter
- Instruments: Vocals; bass guitar
- Years active: 1976–present
- Member of: Right Said Fred
- Website: rightsaidfred.com

Richard Peter John Fairbrass (born 22 September 1953) is an English singer and television presenter, best known as lead singer of the pop group Right Said Fred, who achieved hits in the early 1990s including the singles "I'm Too Sexy" and "Deeply Dippy". He and his band have won two Ivor Novello Awards.

== Early life ==
Fairbrass was born on 22 September 1953 in Kingston upon Thames, Surrey, England, and was brought up in East Grinstead, West Sussex. He has a younger brother.

== Career ==
Before forming his own band, Fairbrass was a bassist who had played with several prominent artists, including Boy George. In 1984, he appeared in Jazzin' for Blue Jean, a video by David Bowie, as the bass player. Towards the end of the 1980s, Fairbass joined with his brother Fred to form Right Said Fred. The Fairbrass brothers performed as a duo for a brief period, touring in New York City. Guitarist Rob Manzoli joined them in 1990. In 1994, he was joint winner of Rear of the Year with Mandy Smith. Following this, Fairbrass co hosted on BBC Two, (with Rhona Cameron), a television series called Gaytime TV (1995–1999) which was aimed at an LGBT audience.

Nude (including full frontal) pictures of Fairbrass were published in the For Women magazine.

In December 1998, Fairbrass presented BBC One's Naked Eurovision, a behind the scenes documentary about the Eurovision Song Contest 1998 in Birmingham. From June to August 2001, he co presented with Gabrielle Richens a game show, The Desert Forges, on Channel 5.

In April 2007, Fairbrass was reported to be planning to run for Mayor of London in the 2008 Election.

During a gay rights rally in Red Square, Moscow, on 27 May 2007, commemorating the 14th anniversary of the de-criminalisation of homosexuality in Russia, Richard Fairbrass and Peter Tatchell were violently assaulted by members of a counter demonstration staged by ultra-nationalists. They were subsequently arrested and detained by Russian police.

== Personal life ==
Richard came out as bisexual in 1991 to The Sun. Richard's long-term partner, from 1982 until 2010, was Stuart Pantry, a BBC make up artist, who died in September 2010 of cancer. Fairbrass has also said he appreciates "pretty guys who look like girls and girls who look like pretty guys."

Fairbrass was hospitalised with COVID-19 in 2021, but has spoken out against COVID-19 measures and has been sceptical of the COVID-19 vaccine.

Fairbrass has routinely commented on the 2022 war in Ukraine, often speaking in support of Russia's invasion and Vladimir Putin's justifications for the conflict. In a Twitter post in December 2022, he called on Putin to resist "western domination". He has also described Volodymyr Zelenskyy and the Ukrainian government as a despotic regime.
