= Vjuan Allure =

Pioneering Ballroom Icon, DJ, Remixer, Producer, and Artist

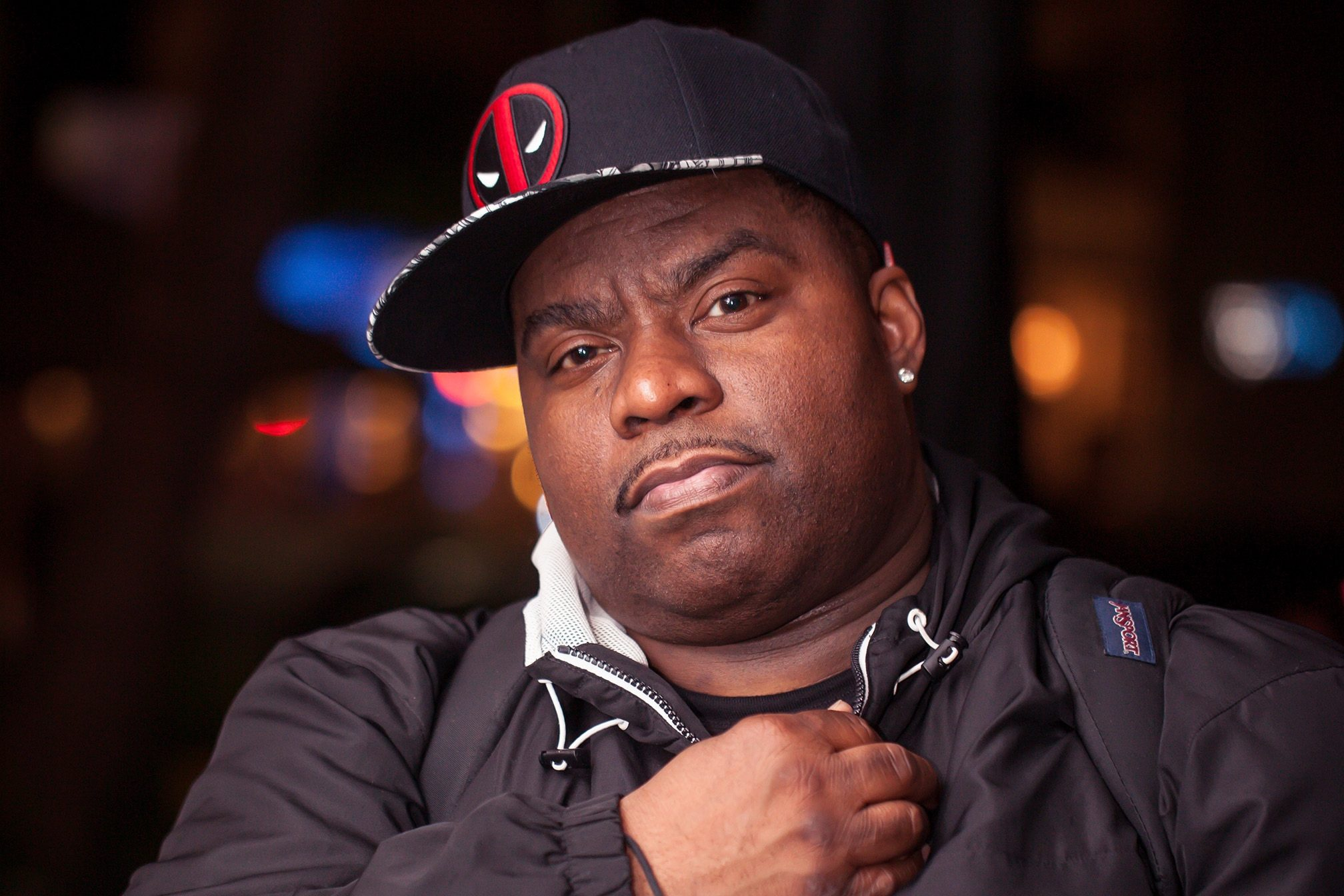
- DJ Vjuan Allure in 2016 during the Miami WMC
- Born: Warren Edward Bembry; 24 July 1965; Atlantic City, New Jersey, US
- Died: 15 March 2021 (aged 55); Gaithersburg, Maryland, US
- Occupations: DJ; Remixer; Producer; Artist
- Years active: 1997 – 2021
- Musical career
- Genres: Ballroom Beatz; Club Music
- Labels: EliteBeatz; Mad Decent; Kult Records; Night Slugs; Fade to Mind; Hot Mom USA; Perfect Plastic; Jaguar Records; 410 Paradox Underground; KnightWerk Records; unquantize; Prjkts; Soled-Out House

Vjuan Allure (born Warren Edward Bembry; July 24, 1965 - March 15, 2021) was an International DJ, remixer, producer, and artist, recognized as a ballroom icon and a key figure in the development and global rise of ballroom music and vogue beats. Born in Atlantic City and raised in New York City, he played a pivotal role in shaping Ballroom Beatz, a genre that became a defining element of ballroom music and gained international prominence in club culture.

Allure's innovative approach to music production significantly influenced the ballroom scene, particularly in the 2000s and 2010s. Throughout his career, Allure performed at major events such as the Winter Music Conference (WMC), the Streetstar Festival, and the Latex Ball. He collaborated with artists including MikeQ, Ultra Naté, and RuPaul while also maintaining a solo career as a producer. In 2019, he was named Godfather of the Iconic House of Saint Laurent, mentoring its members and contributing to the preservation of its legacy.

There is some discrepancy regarding Allure's place of birth. While the official obituary lists his birthplace as Atlantic City, New Jersey, some unofficial sources claim he was born in Ponce, Puerto Rico.

== Early years ==
Allure was born on July 24, 1965, in Atlantic City, New Jersey, and was raised by his parents, Thomas and Mary Bembry. When he was three years old, his family moved to Pleasantville, New Jersey, where he attended elementary and middle school before graduating from Pleasantville High School in 1983.

From an early age, he developed a strong passion for music and dance, drawing inspiration from a wide range of genres, including 1960s soul, 1970s rock, funk, disco, and rap, as well as 1980s electronic music and its subsequent evolutions. At the age of nine, he initiated playing the electric guitar and displayed notable skill on the keyboard. In the late 1970s, he discovered turntable mixing, which soon became his primary focus. Studying the techniques of pioneering DJs, he honed his skills in mixing and beatmaking, laying the foundation for his future career.

While his mother traveled internationally for business, Vjuan stayed in New York with an aunt who allowed him greater freedom in exploring the city's nightlife. His cousins, who were frequent clubgoers, introduced him to the scene, and by the age of eleven, he had already begun making a name for himself as a battle dancer. After persistently requesting to visit a club, he was finally taken to a night filled with house music.

Despite his young age, Allure was already attending smaller clubs and participating in dance battles in New York. By building friendships with dancers and security staff, he became deeply immersed in the culture. This eventually led him to frequent legendary venues such as The Sound Factory in 1989, during Junior Vasquez’s era. He became an active member of the scene and was present at Sound Factory the night Madonna visited and selected voguers Jose and Luis Xtravaganza for her music videos and tour. In February 2015, Vjuan Allure reflected on his musical experiences from that era, stating:

It was amazing to be so young and, during the day, your mindset is hip-hop—Salt-N-Pepa, Big Daddy Kane—, but you turn around and see these [hip-hop] people in the club at night, housing… I mean, dancing, battling. Kid 'N Play, Super Lover Cee & Casanova Rud, they were dancing to house music!

— Vjuan Allure

After graduating from high school, Vjuan Allure enlisted in the United States Navy, where he specialized in electronics and advanced to the rank of Petty Officer First Class. Over the course of his 20-year military career, he received multiple commendations for his performance and retired with an honorable discharge in Maryland. Following his retirement, he continued working in the same field, returning to Bethesda Naval Hospital to further his career in electronics.

While in college, Vjuan Allure participated in a cultural exchange program in Italy, which required prior training at a protocol school in the Washington, D.C. area. As a result, he spent a considerable amount of time in Virginia and Washington, D.C. During this period, he visited Tracks, a nightclub where he was first introduced to the music of DJ Sedrick, whose distinctive style blended techno, house, and Baltimore club beats. Sedrick would later become his mentor, guiding his artistic direction in music production and DJing. Although Allure was a fan of Junior Vasquez, he was particularly drawn to Sedrick's beat-driven style. The club's music, heavily influenced by Chicago house and Detroit techno, played continuously, fueling intense dance battles and audience interaction. Sedrick's dynamic DJing, which incorporated live microphone engagement and spontaneous record scratching, helped establish Tracks as a major nightlife destination, attracting clubgoers from across the United States and beyond.

== Influences and underground scene ==
Vjuan Allure's earliest inspiration for voguing music did not come from New York, like many ballroom DJs, but from Washington, D.C., particularly at Tracks, a major LGBTQ+ nightclub known for its electrifying atmosphere. Unlike the traditional ballroom sounds of New York, the music at Tracks featured a distinctive blend of minimal, house-infused techno that was unconventional and experimental. The synergy between DJ Mike's selections and Sedrick's commanding presence on the microphone created an intense energy on the dance floor, leaving a lasting impression on Allure. Tracks such as DJ Rush's "Looking for Excitement," Lil Louis’ "Blackout," and M1's "Dynomite" played a crucial role in shaping his musical style and influencing his later contributions to ballroom culture. However, the first track that truly ignited his passion for ballroom was Reese and Santonio's "Rock to the Beat," which he described as the ultimate expression of the genre. He regarded it as the pinnacle of ballroom music, characterized by its dramatic beats and open spaces that allowed for creative expression through dance.

Having lived in the D.C., Maryland, and Virginia (DMV) region since the 1990s, he was deeply familiar with its club scene. He described Washington, D.C.'s music landscape as raw and diverse, shaped by influences from Detroit House, Techno, and Hard House. During D.C. Tracks nights, Hard House tracks were frequently played, providing a seamless fit for his sound. In contrast to New York's more curated and selective approach to club music, D.C.'s scene was driven by emotion and audience response.

Baltimore Club, a genre rooted in Miami Bass, emerged as a dominant musical force. According to Allure, it was influenced by New York/Chicago Hip House, with artists such as K-Yze, Doug Lazy, Tyree Cooper, and Fast Eddie playing a key role in its development. He noted few direct connections between Baltimore Club and Garage. His connection to the genre developed naturally, as his first record was Hip House, and upon discovering Baltimore Club, he immediately recognized its similarities. Despite the geographical proximity of Washington, D.C., and Baltimore, their music scenes remained largely distinct—Go-Go was unique to D.C., while Baltimore Club gradually gained traction in the capital due to its popularity and strong presence in dance and rhythm culture.

Allure strengthened his ties to Baltimore's music scene through collaborations with Scottie B, remix work for Unruly Records, and a residency at Ultra Naté's Deep Sugar party. He described his first encounter with Baltimore Club music as an experience of instant connection. While traditional club music was not commonly played at ballroom events, Allure recognized similarities in the relentless rhythmic structure of both styles. His remix of Schwarz's "Lose Your Fvkin Mind" exemplified this fusion.

Vjuan Allure, who pioneered the Ballroom Beatz genre over two decades ago, played a key role in the underground scene's rise to prominence. This evolution was further reinforced by DJs such as Kingdom and MikeQ, and by labels such as Night Slugs and Fade to Mind. He noted that audiences sought new sonic experiences, moving away from traditional ballroom and hip-hop patterns. Allure emphasized the significance of house and disco music in AfroLatinx LGBTQ+ culture, noting their influence for over 60 years. He attributed this connection to the power of rhythm, which transcended race, creed, and color, fostering expression and movement. According to him, house and disco have always conveyed a range of emotions—from joy and love to sorrow and introspection—while continuing to uplift and inspire the community.

He always felt a deep connection to music, though he did not initially recognize his path as a DJ. Vjuan developed a passion for collecting music early on, first influenced by his mother and later curating his own extensive collection. Even as the ballroom scene emerged, he remained dedicated to vinyl collecting. In the late 1990s, Allure relocated to Naples, Italy, where his vast music library became the foundation of his burgeoning DJ career.

== Career ==
When Vjuan Allure arrived in Naples, Italy, often referred to as his "second home", he encountered a music scene vastly different from that of the United States. While hip-hop and R&B dominated the charts in American cities, house music was the prevailing genre in Italy and across Europe, playing on nearly every radio station. As a dedicated house music enthusiast, he aspired to break into the Italian nightlife scene. Nevertheless, entry was challenging due to the dominance of exclusive DJ collectives, or "societies," which limited opportunities. As a result, many talented DJs in Italy never had the chance to perform.

Vjuan Allure started his career as a DJ after relocating to Italy, where local audiences primarily sought hip-hop, while he was drawn to house music. Adapting to the demand, he gained popularity as a hip-hop DJ, introducing a fresh element to the club scene. However, it was his talent as a dancer that initially set him apart. In 1998, he and a friend were dancing, when Angels of Love invited them to perform on stage at a huge venue, an opportunity that led to his inclusion in the renowned Italian DJ crew Angels of Love. Initially brought on as an MC and hip-hop DJ, Allure was determined to establish himself in house music. Within the team, he refined his skills, learning mixing techniques and track transitions. Over time, he incorporated elements of tribal and "cunty house" into his sets, further shaping his distinctive sound.

Vjuan Allure began producing music as a hobby in the late 1990s, using Dr. Rhythm samplers and a Kawai drum machine. Without access to turntables, he relied on a Tascam mixing board to refine his production and mixing skills through manual practice. Due to the equipment's limited memory, his early tracks were only two to three minutes long. However, after learning to transfer and edit music on a computer, he was able to extend them to six to eight minutes. Allure sent his early recordings and edits to DJ Sedrick in the United States, unaware that his work was gaining recognition in the ballroom scene.

While establishing a fanbase in Naples, Allure was briefly forced to return to the United States, temporarily disrupting his growing momentum. Following his return, he continued a habit from a young age: giving friends CDs with short mixes and personal narrations, frequently including his name on them. Initially given as simple gifts, these recordings gradually gained traction as people began requesting new music and sharing his work more widely. Vjuan went on to explore mixes in greater detail. Many people who grew up with hip-hop often made cuts. Blends and establishing seamless transitions were their main focus. Consequently, other DJs were taken aback when he returned. He kept his DJing activities private until he was discovered and invited to perform at prominent clubs such as House Club, Maddison, Angels of Love, The Biggest And The Best, Metropolis, and Havana Club. His reputation in the club music scene grew quickly, and by 1999, he became known as DJ Vjuan Allure. His stage name, "Vjuan," was a combination of the names of his great-grandfather, Virgilio, and his grandfather, Juan.

In 2002, at a pivotal moment in his career, Allure returned to Italy just as his recognition was expanding in the United States. On his second day back, he experienced a defining moment at a club when he recognized a beat, heard his own voice, and saw his name projected—realizing the full extent of his growing popularity. While in Italy, he gained access to various music production software, including Cakewalk and Pro Tools, both in Italian. While navigating programs like Fruity Loops proved challenging, he found Simian particularly effective. It was during this time that he fully committed to producing original tracks, refining his craft, and further developing his signature sound.

=== "Allure Ha": The Sound of Ballroom ===
Vjuan Allure was central to the evolution of the ballroom sound, becoming one of the first producers to create tracks specifically tailored for the scene. His work helped define the sonic identity of modern vogue, solidifying a new genre within club music.

After giving sketch CDs to friends, Vjuan Allure was invited to play at his first performance, a ball, in Detroit in 2000. The frustrating experience motivated him to remix Masters at Work's "The Ha Dance," which marked a watershed moment in his career. He brought crates of vinyl from the suburbs of Washington, D.C., and played extensively before realizing that nobody was paying attention, save for the club owner and a few older customers.

Vjuan sought to reenergize the audience after becoming dissatisfied with the stagnation of the ballroom scene, which featured the same tracks played over and over. After several failed attempts, he discovered that "The Ha Dance" produced the most intense reaction. Back in his studio in Beltsville, Maryland, he created the "Allure Ha," speeding up and rearranging the elements of the original track to fit the emerging vogue femme style.

Two weeks later, he returned to Detroit—a different ball, same club, same situation. Again, no one was dancing. He played "The Ha," and the audience reacted immediately. He then cut the turntable, allowing the track to slow down into a drag before introducing his remix.

You want to vogue femme? You want 'The Ha'? Well, I'll give it to you, but not like YOU remember it... Welcome to the Vjuan Allure Exclusive... 'The Ha'... girls, get ready!

— Vjuan Allure

On that night, history was made. The dance floor erupted, and the song quickly spread throughout the ballroom scene. Despite never being officially released, "Allure Ha" became a ballroom staple, widely sampled and referenced in vogue culture.

His innovative approach was not limited to this remix. His style, known as "Ballroom Beatz," redefined ballroom music production, blending tradition and modernity. In the early stages of his career, his tracks were labeled as Vjuan Allure Exclusives and featured a signature drop reinforcing this identity. As his work gained recognition, other producers started creating their own tracks and branding them as "exclusives" as well. To distinguish his music, he introduced a new tag, Vjuan Allure Magnifique Elite Beat (Elite Beatz!), ensuring a unique identity that would not be replicated. Over time, this designation evolved beyond just a name—it became a signature sound, a defining element of his artistic style. It also developed into a collective of talented and innovative artists, a record label (EliteBeatz), and a growing creative movement that continued to expand.

Allure first became involved in the ballroom scene in the late 1980s when friends in New York and Baltimore exposed him to the culture. He claimed that the music being played at the time—such as songs heard at the Sound Factory—was what was popular. The songs included New Wave classics, "Love Hangover," "Let's Go," and several hits that were well-liked in the clubs, such as "Percolator" and "Master Blaster." His first experience with ballroom houses was with the House of Charisma in Virginia before moving on to the House of Mugler, the House of Essence, the House of Allure, and finally, the House of Saint Laurent. During this time, he was exposed to a wide range of musical influences, including New Wave, house, hip-hop, and dancehall, which shaped his artistic sensibility.

Over time, Vjuan Allure broadened the sonic identity of ballroom beyond "The Ha Dance," creating a vast repertoire that encouraged new forms of expression in dance. His dedication to the genre's evolution was demonstrated by his encouragement of the development of "hyper beats," which are designed to maintain the intensity of battle. He also adapted the iconic "Ha crash" for various ballroom categories, ensuring its presence extended beyond vogue to other styles within the scene. Allure believed that a ballroom track should elicit an immediate response on the dance floor, transcending audience and cultural contexts.

His musical development was heavily influenced by DJ Sedrick, who exposed him to a diverse sonic landscape shaped by Detroit, Chicago, Washington, D.C., Los Angeles, and New York. This exposure led him to develop his own style, emphasizing the connection between music and dance. According to Allure, a skilled DJ must read the energy of the dance floor, adjusting their set in real time to synchronize with dancers and MCs. DJ Sedrick is also credited with reviving "The Ha Dance", particularly in Washington, D.C., before it rapidly spread through the ballroom scene. By the time Allure remixed it, the track was already iconic, known for its distinct syncopation—four steady beats followed by a defining accent that became a hallmark of vogue femme.

Allure's influence extended beyond the United States, bringing the ballroom sound to a global audience. During his international performances, he observed how different audiences responded to the music, demonstrating that, regardless of language barriers, the energy of the beats spoke for itself.

== Legacy ==
His contributions were instrumental in defining what became known as the "vogue beat"—a style characterized by its rhythmic complexity, percussive intensity, and dynamic structure, designed specifically for vogue performances. With an extensive catalog of remixes and productions, he released multiple albums and EPs and collaborated with renowned labels, including Night Slugs, Fade to Mind, and Mad Decent.

Allure was also responsible for iconic remixes, such as those featured on MikeQ's Master Blaster EP and Bok Bok's Southside Remixes EP. In addition to his solo work, he produced tracks for artists such as Missy Elliott, Ashanti, Ultra Naté, CeCe Peniston, and Diplo. His ability to transform sounds and create intense atmospheres on the dancefloor made him a sought-after figure for balls and music events worldwide.

Inspired by ballroom sounds, Vjuan Allure contributed to RuPaul's Butch Queen album in 2016, working on five tracks, including Feel Like a Woman and Category Is... According to Allure, his connection with RuPaul began years earlier when he handed him a CD of his productions at an event in Washington, D.C. Later, RuPaul reached out to him, leading to their musical collaboration.

Although the album was a tribute to ballroom, Allure intentionally chose not to include traditional ballroom beats. Instead, he created innovative sounds that RuPaul had not previously explored. This project showcased his versatility as a producer and his ability to create new sonic landscapes both within and outside the ballroom scene.

=== Cultural impact ===
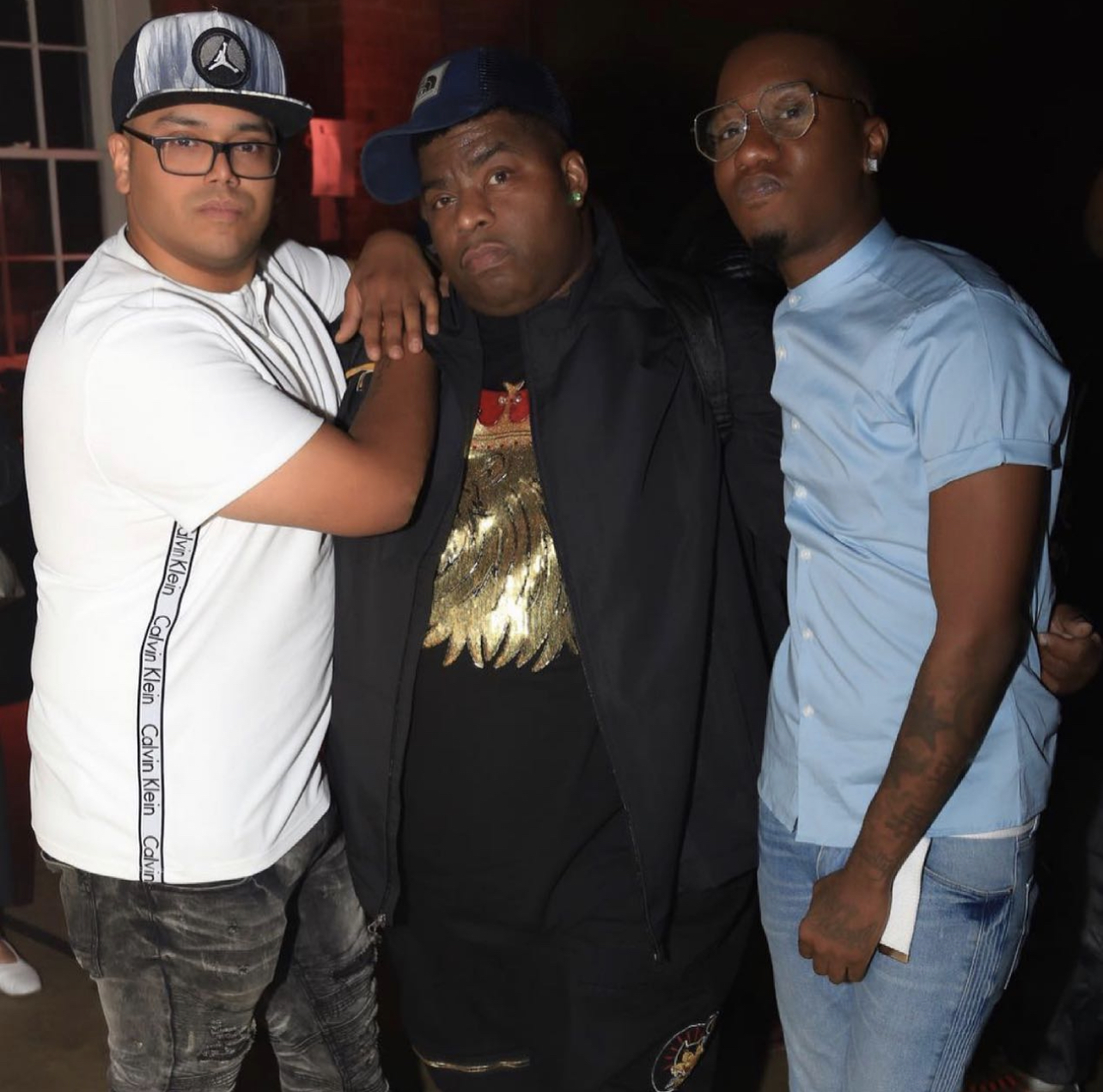
Ballroom Icon DJs: Angel X (Left), Vjuan Allure (Middle), MikeQ (Right)

Vjuan Allure's impact on ballroom culture was immeasurable. As a mentor and collaborator, he played a crucial role in nurturing emerging talent, offering guidance to DJs, producers, and performers alike. He helped redefine the sound of voguing and influenced a new generation of DJs, including MikeQ, Lucky, and Angel X, who regarded him as a mentor. His work brought fresh energy to classic ballroom tracks, remixing iconic songs and creating new anthems for the scene.

Beyond being a talented DJ and producer, Allure had a critical perspective on the cultural appropriation of ballroom. He frequently challenged outsiders in the scene, questioning their intentions when writing or producing anything related to voguing. In interviews, he emphasized the importance of preserving the authenticity of ballroom culture and protecting its original creators from commercial exploitation. His work not only preserved the ballroom music tradition but also ensured its continuous reinvention, cementing his legacy as a sonic architect of vogue culture.

Allure traveled extensively as a DJ and educator of ballroom culture, becoming one of the most in-demand artists in the genre. He held residencies in cities and clubs worldwide, solidifying his presence in the global dance music scene. At events such as the Latex Ball, House Dance International, and Rumble Ball, he showcased his unique mixing and production style to international audiences. His career also included performances at renowned festivals and clubs across Europe, Asia, and America, helping to expand the reach of ballroom music beyond its U.S. roots.

Moreover, his music has been celebrated in various media, including films, documentaries, and live performances, as Legendary, Pose and My House, solidifying his status as a key architect of modern ballroom sound. His dedication to the community and relentless innovation have ensured that his contributions remain an enduring part of ballroom history. While his work continues to be widely recognized, many of the exclusive tracks from his extensive archive remain unreleased following his passing, leaving a significant portion of his musical legacy yet to be fully explored.

Following his passing, the Latex Ball established the Vjuan Allure Brilliance Award, an annual honor that celebrates excellence among ballroom DJs and pays tribute to his enduring influence on the global ballroom scene.

== Albums ==
=== Extended plays (EPs) ===
List of EPs and Remix EPs
| Title | Details |
|---|---|
| "Vjuanage" | Released: March 20, 2013; Label: Mad Decent, Jeffree's; Formats: Digital download |
| "Ultra Nate' Presents Vjuan Allure - Digital Krash" (with Ultra Naté) | Released: May 21, 2013; Label: 410 Paradox Underground; Formats: Digital download |
| "Bandit" | Released: October 20, 2013; Label: Hot Mom USA; Formats: Digital download |
| "Wherkk" | Released: February 24, 2015; Label: KnightWerk Records; Formats: Digital download |
| "ThundaKats" | Released: December 22, 2017; Label: unquantize; Formats: Digital download |
| "Runway Diva Remixxxed (Remixes)" | Released: March 27, 2018; Label: Prjkts; Formats: Digital download |
| "Causing Problemz" | Released: August 13, 2019; Label: Souled Out House; Formats: Digital download |
| "DJ Spen Presents Vjuan Allure - Organismz" (with DJ Spen) | Released: May 7, 2021; Label: unquantize; Formats: Digital download |

== DJ mixes ==
List of DJ mixes
| Title | Album details |
|---|---|
| The Shiver Mix | Released: 28 August 2011 |
| The Resonance Mix Live | Released: 11 May 2012 |
| The Danceteria Mix Live | Released: 11 May 2012 |
| Truancy Volume 51 | Released: 19 September 2012 |
| The 2013 'WMC' Mix | Released: 29 March 2013 |
| Vjuan Allure 'Deep Sugar' Mix One | Released: 22 May 2013 |
| Beasting It | Released: 4 December 2013 |
| 'WMC' 2014 Mix (A Ride Down Collins Ave) | Released: 22 March 2014 |
| Wherkkin' It | Released: 27 March 2015 |
| Holiday Mixtape - The 2015 House Mix | Released: 27 November 2015 |
| 'WMC' 2016 - The Collins Ave Mix | Released: 18 March 2016 |
| Get You Some | Released: 25 November 2017 |
| WinterMix | Released: 26 January 2019 |
| The Old Way - 'Latex' 2019 | Released: 5 August 2019 |
| Skate Mix One | Released: 6 November 2020 |
| Skate Mix Two | Released: 6 November 2020 |
| The Friday Night Mix | Released: 5 December 2020 |

== Singles ==
=== As lead artist ===
List of singles as lead artist
| Title | Year | Album |
|---|---|---|
| "Come On and Get You Some More" (sample of 'Come and Get Some More' by K. Okochi) | 2011 | Non-album singles |
| "Dis Dubb" | 2011 | Non-album singles |
| "Emotion" | 2011 | Non-album singles |
| "Hot For It" (sample of 'Hot For You' by Karen Young) | 2011 | Non-album singles |
| "Queen of Face" (sample of Crystal LaBeija) | 2011 | Non-album singles |
| "The Ocktapussy" | 2011 | Non-album singles |
| "BEEEAT" | 2012 | Non-album singles |
| "Count Da Pussy" | 2012 | Non-album singles |
| "Eating It From the East" (featuring Koppi Mizrahi) | 2012 | Non-album singles |
| "Emotional Elements" (sample of 'So Emotional' by Whitney Houston) | 2012 | Non-album singles |
| "Give It Up" | 2012 | Non-album singles |
| "O.S.N" (featuring Dashaun Wesley) | 2012 | Non-album singles |
| "Polka Dot Afro Circus Pussy" | 2012 | Non-album singles |
| "That Beat" (sample of Don Cornelius) | 2012 | Non-album singles |
| "The X" | 2012 | Non-album singles |
| "WOBBLE HAAA" | 2012 | Non-album singles |
| "RUDE-OFF 2013" | 2013 | A Very Decent Christmas |
| "Lick Da Lights" | 2013 | Track Meet Compilation 02 - TM02 |
| "Lulu Goes In" (featuring Lulu Dallas) | 2014 | Non-album singles |
| "Anaconda Bump" (samples of 'Anaconda by Nicki Minaj' and 'Baby Got Back' by Sir Mix-a-Lot) | 2014 | Non-album singles |
| "Quantification" | 2014 | Non-album singles |
| "Sexy Like Sinia" | 2014 | Non-album singles |
| "Wimins Shoutin" | 2014 | Non-album singles |
| "Gettin' In" | 2015 | Non-album singles |
| "Power of the Lash" (featuring Shauna Brooks Balenciaga) | 2015 | Non-album singles |
| "Wherkk" (featuring Purple Crush) | 2015 | Wherkk EP |
| "Flicka" (featuring Chazzi Mizrahi) | 2016 | Non-album single |
| "I Am Delivert" | 2016 | Sound Pellegrino Presents SND.PE Vol.05 |
| "Ain't No Game" | 2017 | Kingdom - RA.561 |
| "Thumper" | 2017 | Kingdom - RA.561 |
| "The Bash" | 2017 | CyberSonicLA Vol. 2 |
| "Say a Muthafkkin Thing" (featuring Sinia) | 2018 | Non-album singles |
| "Cocoatea" | 2019 | Non-album singles |
| "Any Bitch Want the X" (featuring Jay Xclusive) | 2020 | Non-album singles |
| "Crickets" | 2020 | Non-album singles |
| "Ghrimey Khunt" | 2020 | Non-album singles |
| "Get Your Life at the Latex" | 2020 | Non-album singles |
| "Pussy Work II" | 2020 | Non-album singles |
| "They Were Laughing and Dancing" | 2020 | Non-album singles |

=== As featured artist ===
List of singles as featured artist
| Title | Year | Album |
|---|---|---|
| "Swatting Flies" (Ultraa Energi featuring Vjuan Allure) | 2012 | Mosquito - The Ultraa Sessions Vol. 2.0 |
| "Every Gender" (Micky Galliano featuring Vjuan Allure) | 2013 | Non-album singles |
| "Let Yourself Go" (Toddy Terry vs. Simone Vitullo featuring Vjuan Allure) | 2013 | Non-album singles |
| "I Like It" (Cherie Lily featuring Vjuan Allure) | 2015 | The Dripping Wet EP |
| "The Drum" (Micky Galliano featuring Vjuan Allure) | 2018 | Non-album singles |
| "The Pimp" (Glovibes featuring Vjuan Allure) | 2018 | Non-album singles |
| "Fresh Off the Runway" (DJ Fade featuring Vjuan Allure) | 2019 | Non-album singles |
| "Ice Cream Truck 2020" (Cazwell featuring Vjuan Allure) | 2020 | Non-album singles |
| "Gemstone" (Cherie Lily featuring Jack Mizrahi, Vjuan Allure and Robbie Rivera) | 2021 | Gemstone EP |
| "Hunni Let Me Tell U" (Angel X featuring First Choice & Vjuan Allure) | 2022 | LEGEND Vol. 2 |
| "Girls Get Ready (Get Into It)" (Angel X featuring Vjuan Allure) | 2023 | Non-album single |

=== Promotional singles ===
List of promotional singles, showing year released and album name
| Title | Year | Album |
|---|---|---|
| "Ratched" | 2012 | Ratched |
| "Ass Bump" | 2012 | Ratched |
| "Big Gurl" | 2012 | Ratched |

== Other appearances ==
=== Production ===
| Title | Year | Artist(s) | Album | Credit(s) |
|---|---|---|---|---|
| "Category is..." | 2016 | Rupaul | Butch Queen | Featured, producer and writer |
| "Feel Like a Woman" | 2016 | Rupaul | Butch Queen | Featured, producer and writer |
| "Drag Queen Honey" | 2016 | Rupaul | Butch Queen | Featured, producer and writer |
| "High Fashion Labels" | 2016 | Rupaul | Butch Queen | Featured, producer and writer |
| "Nothing Nice" | 2016 | Rupaul | Butch Queen | Featured, producer and writer |
| "Spotlight" | 2017 | Rupaul | American | Songwriter, producer |
| "Category Is" | 2018 | Rupaul | Non-album single | Songwriter, producer |
| "Let God Work" | 2022 | Wayne Williams, DJ Spen, Richard Burton and Tasha LaRae | Let God Work (the Remixes) | Drums |

=== Remixes ===
List of remix work for other artists, showing year released and album name
| Title | Year | Other artist(s) | Album |
|---|---|---|---|
| "Yes It's Right (Vjuan Allure 2010)" | 2010 | Craig Loftis, Grand High Priest | Non-album singles |
| "Chase Me (Elite Beatz Mad Dub)" | 2011 | Inaya Day | Non-album singles |
| "Go Off! (Vjuan Allure the Elite Go Off)" | 2011 | Gomi, Sahara Davenport | Go Off (the Remixes) |
| "The Master Blaster (Vjuan Allure Remix)" | 2011 | DJ MikeQ | Let It All Out (EP) |
| "Scissor Sisters (Ha Ha Remix)" | 2012 | Scissor Sisters | Non-album single |
| "Fich So Saxy - Vjuan Allure Remix" | 2012 | DJ Apt One | Fich So Saxy (EP) |
| "Legends - Vjuan Allure Elite Fake Mix" | 2012 | Ultra Naté, Chris Burns | Ulltra Nate' Presents Chris Burns - The Remixes Vol. 1 |
| "Lose Your Fvckin Mind (Vjuan Allure Remix)" | 2012 | Schwarz | FACT 318 |
| "Silo Pass (Vjuan Allure Remix)" | 2012 | Bok Bok | Southside Remixes |
| "Drone Warfare (Vjuan Allure Remix)" | 2013 | Ynfynyt Scroll | Drone Warfare |
| "Tom Landry (Vjuan Allure Remix)" | 2013 | Hypeheadz | Luxury |
| "Yea Hoe (Vjuan Allure Remix)" | 2013 | Gangsta Boo & Sinjin Hawke | Yea Hoe Mixes |
| "Do Your Thing Girl - The Elite Thang Mix" | 2013 | Cherie Lily | The Dripping Wet (EP) |
| "Body - The Elite Body Mix" | 2013 | Cherie Lily | Non-album singles |
| "Ain't Nobody Got Time for Dat Pumped" (sample of 'Ain't Nobody Got Time for That) | 2013 | Sweet Brown | Non-album singles |
| "Everybody Loves The Night - The Elite 4AM Remix" | 2013 | Ultra Naté | Non-album singles |
| "Grown Woman (the Elite Panties Remix)" | 2013 | Beyoncé, Kevin JZ Prodigy | Non-album singles |
| "I Don't Care (the Elite I Love It Remix)" | 2013 | Icona Pop | Non-album singles |
| "Bibbity Bobbity HA (WTT2 Challenge Remix)" | 2014 | Kevin JZ Prodigy | Non-album singles |
| "Can't Say No (Vjuan Allure The Elite Hell No Remix)" | 2014 | Somepoe | Can't Say No (EP) |
| "Kiss My Lips - Vjuan Allure Gloss Mix" | 2014 | Cherie Lily | Kiss My Lips Remix (EP) |
| "Synthetic feat. Roxy - The Elite Polyester Vjuan Allure Remix" | 2014 | The Ride Committee | Synthetic feat. Roxy - Remixes Part 2 |
| "The Bund (Vjuan Allure "The Elite" Remix)" | 2014 | Sonny Zamolo | The Bund (EP) |
| "Let A Diva Know (the Musical)" | 2015 | Bernadette Cooper, Penny Ford and Dawn Hayes | Last Diva On Earth Episode 1: Planet Sexy |
| "Groove On (Vjuan Allure Elite Over-Drive Remix)" | 2015 | Woozee | Car Crash Set Essentials: Club Kicks |
| "WTF (the Elite New Car Whip Remix)" | 2015 | Missy Elliott | Non-album singles |
| "Kastiga (the Vjuan Allure Eliteswing Mix)" | 2016 | DJ Torture | Non-album singles |
| "Milan Darling - Vjuan Alure (Automatic Reaction Mix)" | 2016 | Oso Milan | Non-album singles |
| "Aqua Tryst - Vjuan Alure Elite Bubble Remix" | 2016 | Akito | Metamessage Remix (EP) |
| "Come Pay Me (feat. Vjuan Allure) - Original Mix" | 2016 | Rupaul | Butch Queen Ru-mixes |
| "Gotta Hold On Me - Vjuan Alure Remix" | 2016 | Sheila Ford | Quantize Miami Sampler 2016 |
| "MAK3 L0VE (Vjuan Alure Elite Beatz Orgy Remix)" | 2016 | CVNT TRAXXX | CANNABIS KITSCH (EP) |
| "Philabrity - Vjuan Alure Remix" | 2016 | Sugur Shane | Philabrity |
| "Pum Pum - Vjuan Alure's Elite Touch Remix" | 2016 | TT The Artist | Art Royalty Abstract |
| "Wave Runner - Vjuan Alure's Elite Wavy Mix" | 2016 | Distal | Bushido Rave (Remixes) |
| "A Shade Shady (Now Prance) (Rerecorded)" | 2017 | Rupaul | Remember Me: Essential, Vol. 1 |
| "Finally (Vjuan Allure Remix)" | 2017 | Ce Ce Peniston | (25 Years Of) Finally |
| "Go Go Life - Vjuan Allure Top Ten Remix" | 2017 | CEO CASSI | Non-album single |
| "I'm Too Sexy (Vjuan Allure the Elite Sexxpot)" | 2017 | Ultra Naté & Quentin Harris As Black Stereo Faith | Black Stereo Faith (Remixes) |
| "Basic Bitch - Vjuan Allure Mix" | 2018 | Jade Elektra | Basic Bitch (Remixes) |
| "Hey - Vjuan Allure the Elite Hey You Remix" | 2019 | Black Stereo Faith | Hey [Remixes] |
| "I Know Better - Vjuan Allure Elite Knowledge Remix" | 2019 | Dana Weaver | I Know Better (the Remixes) |
| "Slap My B*tt - Vjuan Allure Remix" | 2019 | Kiddy Smile | One Trick Pony (Remixes) |
| "Fantasy - Vjuan Allure Elite Remix" | 2019 | Shalon | Non-album singles |
| "It's Ovah - Vjuan Allure's Elite Ovahness Remix" | 2020 | Kiwi Dreams, Darrell Martin and Omri Anghel | Non-album singles |
| "May the Best Girl Win (Just Be Fabulous & Cuddle)" | 2021 | Bernadette Cooper, Klymaxx-Lorena Lungs | May The Best Girl Win |

== See also ==
- Club music
- Ball culture
- Vogue
- LGBTQ culture in New York City
- How Do I Look website, about the Harlem Drag Balls
