= Renaissance: A Film by Beyoncé =

2023 documentary concert film

- Theatrical release poster
- Directed by: Beyoncé
- Written by: Beyoncé
- Based on: Renaissance World Tour
- Produced by: Beyoncé; Melina Matsoukas; Justina Omokhua; Mark Ritchie; Erinn Williams; John Winter
- Starring: Beyoncé; Jay-Z; Blue Ivy Carter; Matthew Knowles; Tina Knowles; Diana Ross; Megan Thee Stallion; Cardi B; Kevin Jz Prodigy; Kendrick Lamar; Kelly Rowland; Michelle Williams; LaTavia Roberson; LeToya Luckett
- Cinematography: Dax Blinn; Irie Calkins
- Edited by: Tom Watson
- Production company: Parkwood Entertainment
- Distributed by: AMC Theatres
- Release dates: November 25, 2023 (Samuel Goldwyn Theater); December 1, 2023 (United States)
- Running time: 168 minutes
- Country: United States
- Language: English
- Box office: $44.4 million

Renaissance: A Film by Beyoncé is a 2023 American documentary concert film written, directed, and produced by Beyoncé. Similar to Homecoming: A Film by Beyoncé (2019), the film chronicles the development and execution of her 2023 Renaissance World Tour, conducted to support her seventh studio album Renaissance (2022).

Beyoncé signed a distribution agreement with AMC Theatres and announced the concert film after concluding the tour in Kansas City, Missouri. The film depicts the creation of Renaissance and the production of the tour. Her family members, namely husband Jay-Z, parents Mathew and Tina Knowles, cousin Angela Beyincé, and three children Blue Ivy, Rumi, and Sir Carter are featured in the film. Diana Ross, Megan Thee Stallion, and Kendrick Lamar are featured in musical performances; former Destiny's Child members Kelly Rowland, Michelle Williams, LaTavia Roberson, and LeToya Luckett make brief appearances throughout the film. The end credits feature "My House", a 2023 single by Beyoncé in support of the film.

The film premiered at the Samuel Goldwyn Theater in Los Angeles on November 25, 2023, before the theatrical release in the United States on December 1. The film received universal praise from critics and fans alike, who praised the concert footage, production, behind-the-scenes elements and Beyoncé's stage presence, and has grossed over $44 million at the global box office.

== Background ==
American singer Beyoncé released her seventh studio album, Renaissance, on July 29, 2022. Inspired by her desire for escapism during the COVID-19 pandemic, the album was universally acclaimed by music critics for its joyous and eclectic celebration of post-1970s black dance music and ball culture. It broke several commercial records, was named the best album of 2022 by multiple publications, and helped Beyoncé become the most awarded person in Grammy Awards history.

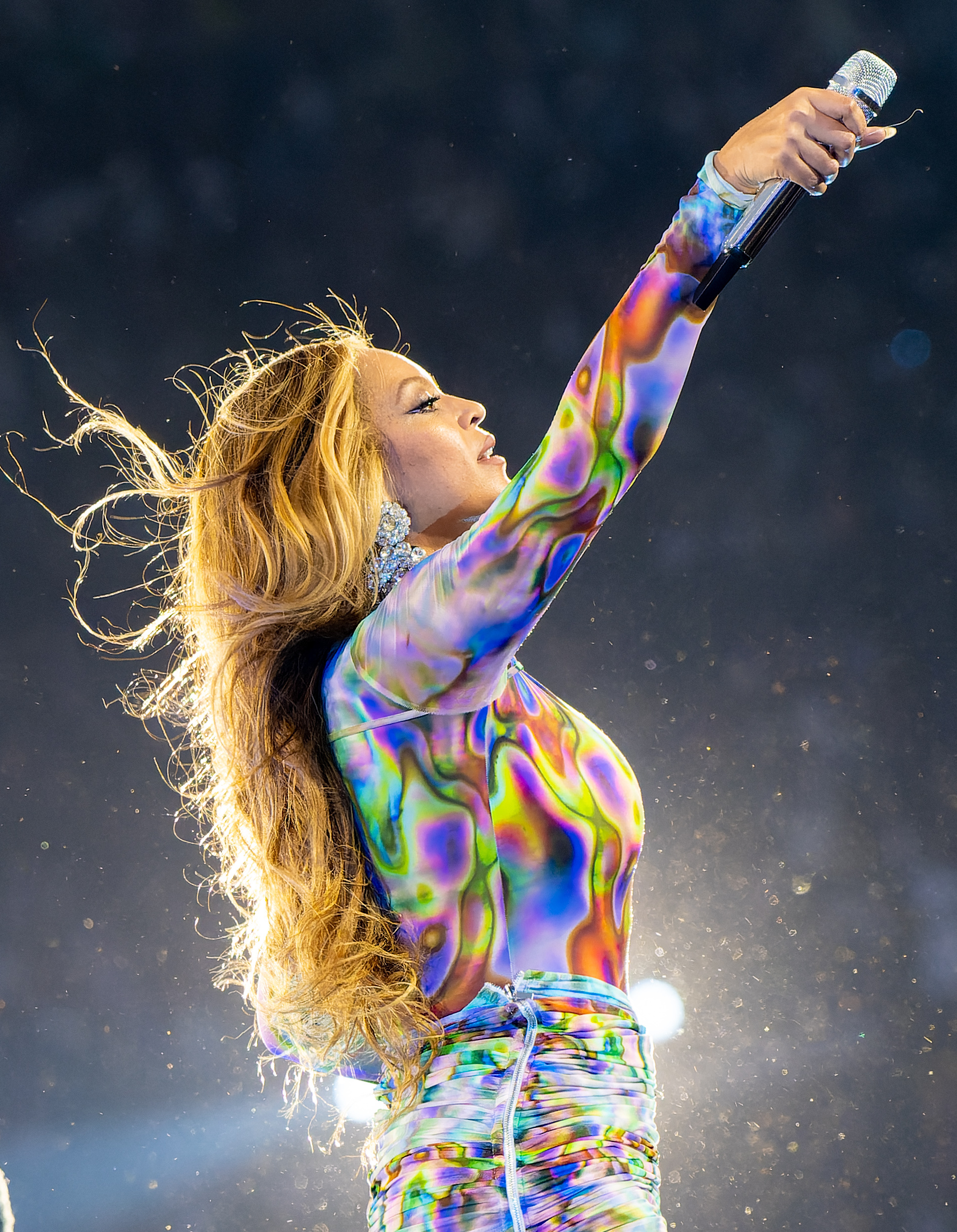
Beyoncé performing at the Renaissance World Tour, at Tottenham Hotspur Stadium in London

Critics and fans quickly realized that Beyoncé did not release a visual companion with Renaissance, as she did with her previous works B'Day (2006), Beyoncé (2013), Lemonade (2016) and The Lion King: The Gift (2019). These are frequently described as a visual album or a musical film. Beyoncé released a teaser video for the opening track of Renaissance, "I'm That Girl", on August 9, 2022, which included a rapid montage of over twenty outfits; news outlets interpreted this as a preview of the various music videos for each track on the album. In support of Renaissance, she announced her sixth solo headlining concert tour, the Renaissance World Tour, on February 1, 2023, via her Instagram account. The all-stadium concert run began on May 10, in Stockholm, Sweden, and concluded on October 1, in Kansas City, Missouri. The tour received critical acclaim, with particular praise for the production value and Beyoncé's vocal performance, becoming the seventh highest-grossing concert tour of all time, the highest-grossing tour ever by a female artist, the highest-grossing tour by a black artist, achieved the two highest monthly tour-grosses in history according to Billboard Boxscore.

On September 30, 2023, Variety reported that Beyoncé would be releasing a concert film through AMC Theatres. The film was reported to have been auctioned to the major film studios and streaming platforms, with Beyoncé choosing "an unconventional deal template forged by AMC and Taylor Swift", wherein Beyoncé would receive over 50 percent of the box office gross. According to Variety's sources, the film would have an "ambitious scope", incorporating highlights from the full run of the tour, the visual album of Renaissance, and documentary footage of the development of both the album and the tour, though only the tour was featured in the final cut.

== Release ==
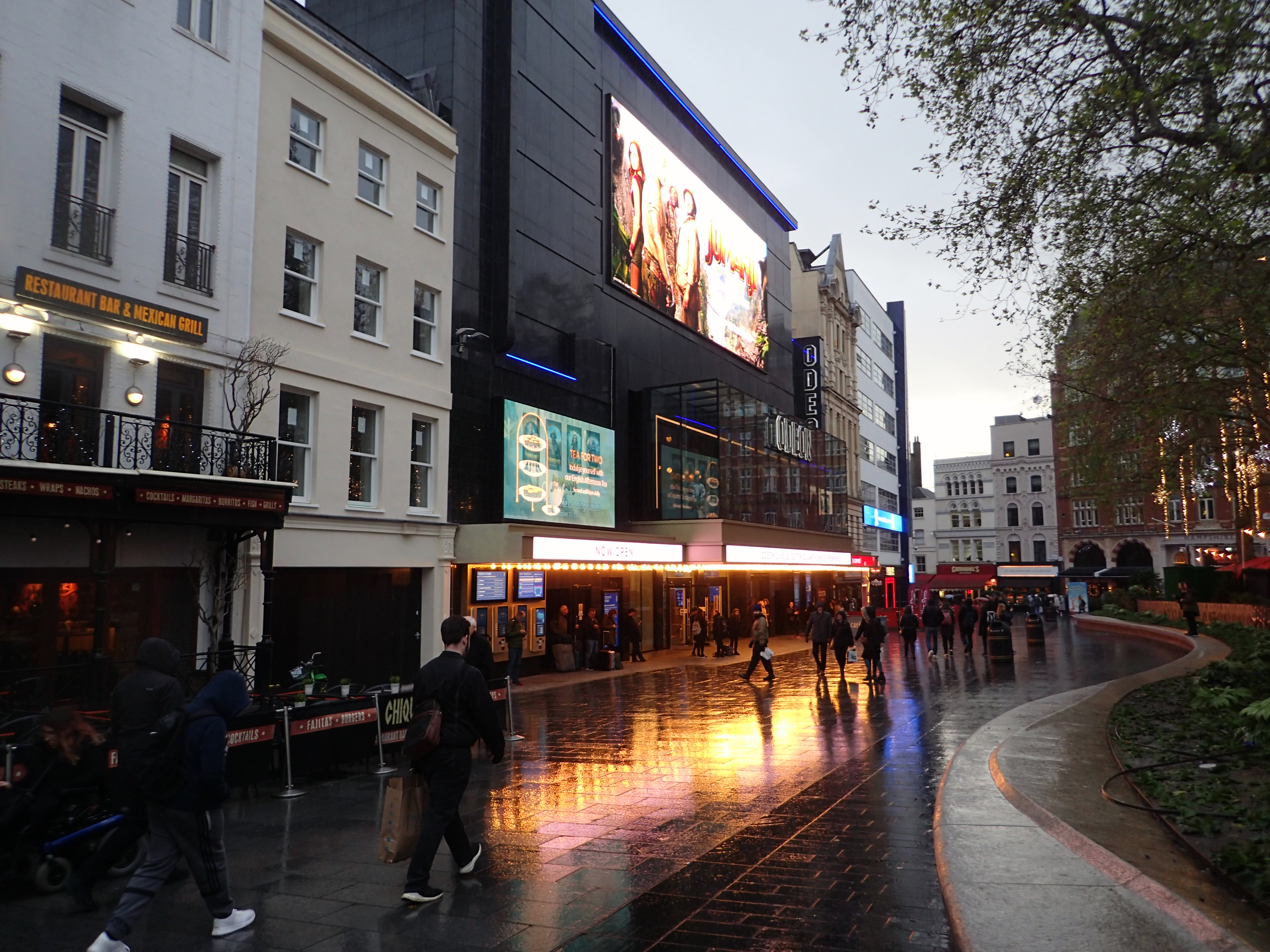
Odeon Luxe Leicester Square in London hosted one of the two premieres of the film on November 30, 2023.

Renaissance: A Film by Beyoncé released on December 1, 2023. The release date is noted for falling on World AIDS Day, as the corresponding album is dedicated to Beyoncé's "Uncle" John Edward Rittenhouse Jr., who introduced her to Black dance music and ball culture and died during the AIDS epidemic. The end credits song, titled "My House", was surprise released alongside the movie. The film had its world premiere at the Samuel Goldwyn Theater in Los Angeles on November 25, 2023. An additional premiere was held on November 30, at London's Leicester Square. The film opened in the United States, Canada and Mexico, with additional global availability announced on October 26. Uproxx reported that fans were added to virtual queues while attempting to purchase tickets. Deadline Hollywood reported that the first-day ticket presales of the film is estimated to be around US$6–7 million. Tickets for territories outside the US went on sale November 9 from the film's website. The film was available in IMAX and Dolby Cinema, as well as other branded premium large-format screens.

The film received a wider international release on December 21, 2023, with Beyoncé making a surprise appearance at the film's premiere event in Salvador, Bahia, Brazil. This marked the singer's first visit to the country since The Mrs. Carter Show World Tour in 2013.

== Reception ==
=== Box office ===
Renaissance: A Film by Beyoncé grossed $33.9 million in the United States and Canada, and $10.5 million in other territories, for a worldwide total of $44.4 million.

In the United States and Canada, the film was released alongside Silent Night, Godzilla Minus One, and The Shift, and was originally projected to grossed $17–20 million from 2,539 theatres in its opening weekend. After making $11.6 million on its first day (including previews), it went on to debut to $22 million, marking the second-best opening weekend for the first week of December, behind The Last Samurai ($24 million in 2003). In its second weekend, the movie bringing in $5 million and securing the sixth spot.

In its first week in a few countries, the film grossed $5.5 million from 94 countries outside the US and Canada, opening at number four in the UK box office and number six in Australia.

=== Critical response ===
Renaissance: A Film by Beyoncé received widespread acclaim from critics, with emphasis on the concert footage and the intimate behind-the-scenes elements. On the review aggregator website Rotten Tomatoes, 98% of 40 critics' reviews are positive, with an average rating of 8.6/10. The website's consensus reads: "Part documentary, part concert film, RENAISSANCE: A FILM BY BEYONCÉ shows two sides of the artist—and they're both equally brilliant." On Metacritic, the film has a weighted average score of 86 out of 100, based on 26 critic reviews, indicating "universal acclaim". Audiences polled by CinemaScore gave the film a rare average grade of "A+", while those polled at PostTrak gave it a 97% overall positive score, with 90% saying they would definitely recommend the film.

In a five-star review for The Independent, Roisin O'Connor wrote that the film "shows a level of perfectionism beyond any other artist" through "a rare and remarkable" inside-look into the tour's production, comparing Beyoncé to filmmaker Steven Spielberg. O'Connor also lauds the "staggering" and "extraordinary" live performance segments of the film, concluding: "The tempo and sheer spectacle of it all leaves you breathless. No one compares." The Guardian's Steve Rose praised the "affecting" and "intriguing" documentary segments of the film, which successfully "strip back the façade of perfection Beyoncé perpetually exudes" and provide insights into the "staggeringly accomplished" tour.

Sughnen Yongo of Forbes wrote that the core of the film is "Beyoncé's unparalleled artistic mastery", which "seamlessly blends music, dance, and cinematography" into a "cinematic experience that is both vivid and authentic". Ross Bonaime of Collider described the film as a "stupendous" and a " tremendous look at one of the biggest concert experiences in recent memory, as well as what makes one of the most iconic singers of our time tick", where Beyoncé "shows her underrated skills as a director" on "a whole other level".

Mark Olsen of the Los Angeles Times described the film as "startlingly candid", with the "notoriously guarded" Beyoncé revealing behind-the-scenes insights from the tour and intimate moments with her family. Writing for The Hollywood Reporter, Angie Han praised the innovative editing and maximalist set design, making the film "feel like a spiritual experience unto itself". Katie Campione of Deadline also likened the film to a religious experience, with its "immersive" visuals and "breathtaking" performance. Today's Arianna Davis agreed, writing that the film "stands apart in its breathtaking visuals" and noting that it was "made for the big screen". Philip Cosores of Uproxx described Renaissance: A Film by Beyoncé as "masterful, brave and affecting" filmmaking."

The film was named the sixth best movie of 2023 by Essence and the 20th best by Consequence.

== Accolades ==
| Award | Date of ceremony | Category | Recipient(s) | Result | Ref. |
|---|---|---|---|---|---|
| BET Awards | June 30, 2024 | Best Movie | Renaissance: A Film by Beyoncé | Nominated | |
| Black Reel Awards | January 16, 2024 | Outstanding Documentary Feature | Beyoncé | Nominated | |
| Black Reel Awards | January 16, 2024 | Outstanding Original Song | "My House" by Beyoncé and The-Dream | Nominated | |
| Black Reel Awards | January 16, 2024 | Outstanding Costume Design | Beyoncé and Shiona Turini | Nominated | |
| Black Reel Awards | January 16, 2024 | Outstanding Production Design | Hannah Beachler | Nominated | |
| GLAAD Media Award | March 14, 2024 | Special Recognition | Renaissance: A Film by Beyoncé | Won | |
| iHeartRadio Music Awards | April 1, 2024 | Favorite On Screen | Renaissance: A Film by Beyoncé | Nominated | |
| WOWIE Awards | 2024 | Best Documentary | Renaissance: A Film by Beyoncé | Won | |

== Impact ==
Shares for AMC, IMAX and Cinemark Theatres rose following the announcement of the film. According to CNBC's Sarah Whitten, Renaissance: A Film by Beyoncé will provide a "much-needed boom" for the film industry, which is still recovering from the effects of the COVID-19 pandemic. Shawn Robbins, chief analyst at BoxOffice.com, said that Beyoncé will fill the typically slow period between Thanksgiving and Christmas, which will in turn change how the industry approaches these "dead zones". The film has ushered in a revival of concert films, according to The Sydney Morning Herald. The Times suggested the film to be "the future of live music", aiding both the UK's live music industry and film industry.

== Set list ==
The following songs were included in the film.

1. "Dangerously in Love 2"
2. "Flaws and All"
3. "I'm That Girl"
4. "Cozy"
5. "Alien Superstar"
6. "Lift Off"
7. "Cuff It"
8. "Energy"
9. "Break My Soul" (contains elements of "The Queens Remix")
10. "Formation"
11. "Diva"
12. "Run the World (Girls)"
13. "My Power"
14. "Black Parade"
15. "Savage Remix" (with Megan Thee Stallion)
16. "Partition"
17. "Church Girl"
18. "Get Me Bodied"
19. "Before I Let Go"
20. "Crazy in Love"
21. "River Deep – Mountain High"
22. "Love Hangover" (with Diana Ross)
23. "Plastic Off the Sofa"
24. "Virgo's Groove" / "Naughty Girl" (contains elements of "Love to Love You Baby")
25. "Move"
26. "Heated"
27. "Thique"
28. "All Up in Your Mind"
29. "Drunk in Love"
30. "America Has a Problem" (with Kendrick Lamar)
31. "Pure/Honey" (contains elements of "Blow")
32. "Summer Renaissance"
33. "My House" (End Credits)

== Analysis ==
Multiple publications have described the film as a "celebration of liberation" and "black pride", with Beyoncé facing the challenges of "being heard and seen" as a racialized woman. Billboard's Kyle Denis wrote that the film "is as much about the enigmatic artistic genius as it is about community", highlighting the groups of people who crafted the tour behind-the-scenes, attended the concerts and "inspired the throughlines of Black queer liberation that course through" the Renaissance era. The Hollywood Reporter's Angie Han praised Beyoncé for spotlighting and crediting the queer black community and pioneers of ball culture, which the album's sound is rooted in. Victoria Moss of the Evening Standard wrote that the highlight of the film was the "poignant moments" when Beyoncé pays tribute to her Uncle Jonny, her gay relative who died during the AIDS epidemic and who introduced her to the house music and ball culture that Renaissance celebrates.
