= Cozy (song) =

Song by Beyoncé

from the album Renaissance
- Released: July 29, 2022
- Studio: Juicy Juicy (Los Angeles); Parkwood West (Los Angeles); Trailer (East Hampton, New York)
- Genre: Chicago house; deep house
- Length: 3:30
- Label: Parkwood; Columbia
- Songwriters: Beyoncé; Honey Redmond; Christopher Penny; Luke Solomon; Dave Giles II; Nija Charles; Terius Nash; Michael Dean; Corece Smith; Curtis Jones; Kim Cooper; Peter Rauhofer; Ts Madison
- Producers: Beyoncé; Honey Dijon; Chris Penny; Solomon

Lyric video
- "Cozy" on YouTube

"Cozy" is a song by American singer Beyoncé. It is the second track on her seventh studio album Renaissance (2022), which was released on July 29, 2022, through Parkwood and Columbia.

== Composition ==
Well, first of all, I had to pick my jaw off the ground when that call came. It was so humbling to feel that the work that you've been doing and your lived experience was being acknowledged by someone of that caliber. So it was very humbling. And one of the things that I was told from her team was that, you know, she wanted to make this dance record and she wanted to go to the true source of Chicago house music.

— Honey Dijon on "Cozy"

"Cozy" is a slinky and energetic Chicago house and deep house song with themed lyrics of self-love, self-empowerment, and trans empowerment. The drum-line backed production is driven off a sample of "Get With U" by Lidell Townsell & M.T.F. House music pioneer Honey Dijon, who is trans, provided the song's production.

Beyoncé makes a reference to the Progress Pride flag in the lyrics with each color being mentioned. During the song's post-chorus and bridge, there features a vocal excerpt of Ts Madison from her YouTube video "Bitch I'm Black".

== Critical reception ==
"Cozy" received positive reviews from critics at the time of the parent album's release, many commending the track's self-empowerment lyrics. In a review by Complex, Karla Rodriguez stated that the song "feels like someone is speaking affirmations over you, making you feel so damn good about yourself". Mark Beaumont of The Independent called the track an "anthem of self-love and black pride" in the style of "muted future R&B."

== Commercial performance ==
After the release of Renaissance, "Cozy" debuted on the Billboard Hot 100 chart at number 30 and on the Hot R&B/Hip-Hop Songs chart at number 13.

== Personnel and credits ==
=== Samples ===
- contains a sample of "Get With U", written by Curtis Alan Jones and performed by Lidell Townsell & M.T.F
- contains an excerpt of "Bitch I'm Black" by Ts Madison
- contains a sample of "Unique", as performed by Danube Dance featuring Kim Cooper.

=== Recording locations ===
- The Trailer East Hampton (New York)
- The Juicy Juicy (Los Angeles, California)
- Parkwood West (Los Angeles, California)

== Live performance ==
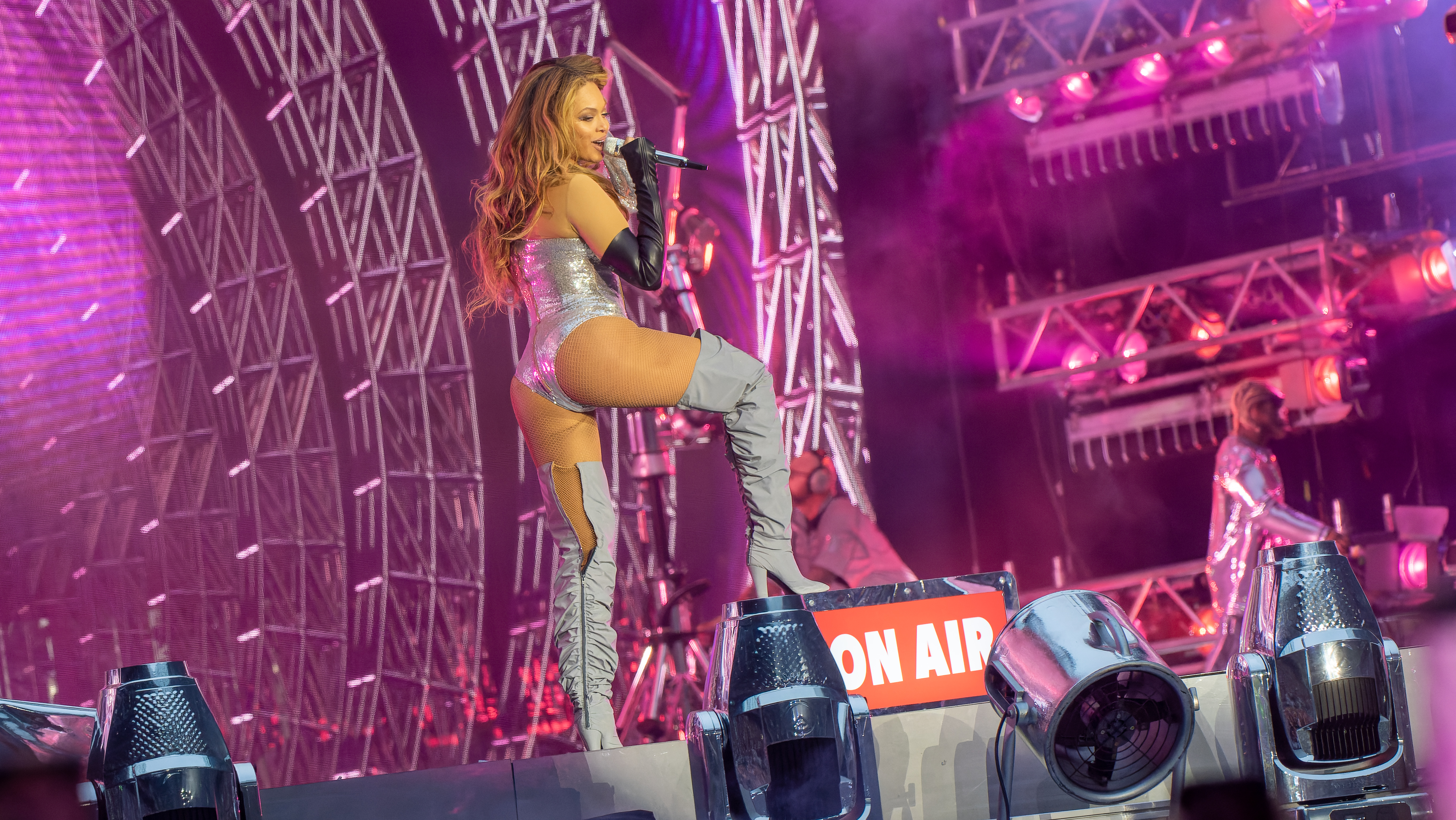
Beyoncé performing "Cozy" on the Renaissance World Tour in 2023

Beyoncé first performed "Cozy" in Stockholm, Sweden on the opening night of the Renaissance World Tour. The song takes place in the robotic-themed "Renaissance" act of the tour and transitioned from "I'm That Girl", like on the album. The performance begins with a dance intro with Beyoncé moving robotically alongside two mechanical arms resembling frames. During this intro, there are spoken vocals by Kevin Jz Prodigy, a ballroom commentator and elements borrowed from "Pure/Honey" and “Virgo’s Groove”. Throughout the performance, there is a pink colored holograph reading off some of the song's lyrics.

The fashion for this segment of the tour was interchanged with each date, starting with a custom Courrèges outfit from the fall 2023 collection. Later, she would wear a custom Philosophy di Lorenzo Serafini bodysuit, then a metallic Balmain bodysuit.

Beyoncé later performed "Cozy" on the Cowboy Carter Tour, emulating the original performance, but with gold-framed robots and a cowboy outfit.

== Charts ==
Weekly chart performance for "Cozy"
Chart (2022)	Peak position
Australia (ARIA)	46
Canada Hot 100 (Billboard)	46
France (SNEP)	110
Global 200 (Billboard)	27
South Africa Streaming (TOSAC)	11
US Billboard Hot 100	30
US Hot R&B/Hip-Hop Songs (Billboard)	12

== Certifications ==
Region	Certification	Certified units/sales
Brazil (Pro-Música Brasil)	3× Platinum	120,000^{‡}
Canada (Music Canada)	Gold	40,000^{‡}
United Kingdom (BPI)	Silver	200,000^{‡}
United States (RIAA)	Gold	500,000^{‡}
^{‡} Sales+streaming figures based on certification alone.
