= Inner-City Filmmakers =

Inner-City Filmmakers (ICF) is an entertainment industry career-training and job placement program located in Santa Monica, California for marginalized, low-income youth living in Los Angeles County. The non-profit organization was founded in 1993 following the LA Riots by film editor Fred Heinrich and producer Stephania Lipner to address economic gap and lack of access to the entertainment industry.

Today, alumni of Inner-City Filmmakers are members of Motion Picture Editors Guild, American Society of Cinematographers, Costume, Grips, Props, and Studio Electrical Lighting Technicians Unions and the Directors Guild of America.

== Curriculum ==
Each year, 30 to 40 applicants ages 17–22 from across Los Angeles are accepted into the two-month Summer "Bootcamp" Program. Learning from industry professionals, guest speakers, and mentors, students take a minimum of 25 hours of classes per week in screenwriting, producing, directing, cinematography and editing, in addition to participating in workshops and field trips, students also work in groups to create individual short films, which are screened at the Samuel Goldwyn Theater at the Academy of Motion Picture Arts and Sciences building in Beverly Hills at the end of the Summer.

After completing the Summer Program, students have the option of continuing to take intermediate and advanced classes in the Winter and Spring.

== Notable alumni ==
- Gil Kenan
