= MikeQ =

American DJ, musician and music producer

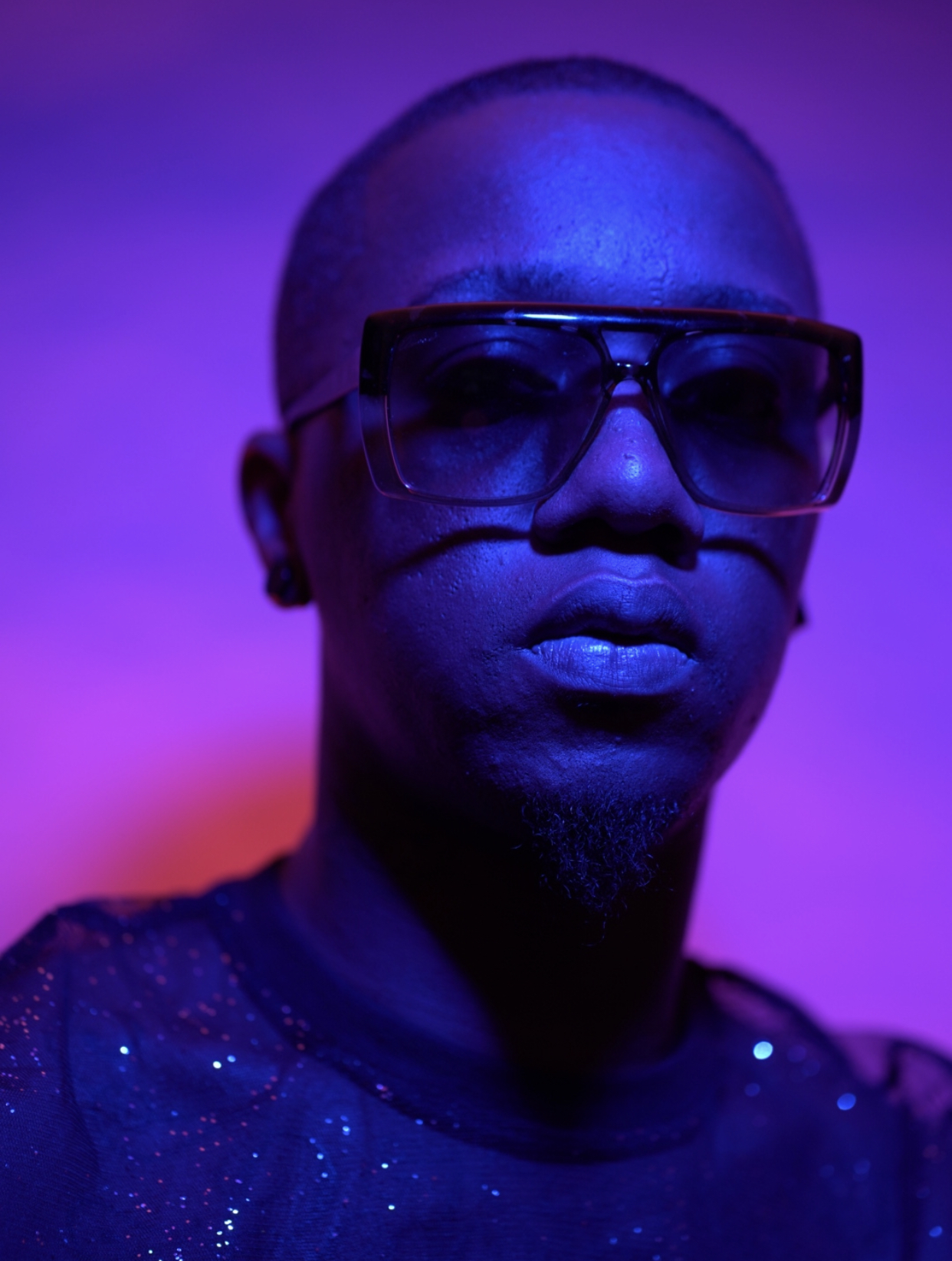
MikeQ Headshot, 2020

Michael Cox, known by the stage name MikeQ, is an American DJ, musician, music producer, and prominent figure in the ballroom community. He is the founder of the record label Qween Beat. In 2020 MikeQ was the DJ for HBO's Legendary.

== Early life ==
Michael Cox was born in Hackensack, New Jersey and grew up in Newark. He was first exposed to the ballroom scene in 2003, when the 17-year-old Cox attended an LGBT+ party at The Globe, a now defunct venue in Newark. In 2004 he began to release music and joined the House of LaBeija. In September 2005, he DJ'ed his first gig at The Globe.

== DJing and music production ==
MikeQ's style has been described by The New York Times as "ecstatic ballroom house", and by Resident Advisor and Fact as "Spine Snapping". He has DJ'ed numerous parties, balls, and events primarily in New York City and New Jersey, but also London, Los Angeles, Tokyo, Moscow, Paris, Mexico, Australia, and Seoul, including events with MoMa PS1, Unsound Festival, Opening Ceremony, Turrbotax, Icee Hot, Ghetto Gothic, Fade To Mind & Night Slugs party nights, and Boiler Room. MikeQ released his debut EP in 2011, "Let At All Out", on Fade to Mind. The EP includes "The Ha Dub Rewerk'd", an interpretation of the ballroom staple by Vjuan Allure, "The Ha Allure" (1999).

In 2017 he co-founded the "House of Vouge" party in New York City. He is the resident DJ on the TV show Legendary.

He produced the music for the 2016 film Kiki, directed by Sara Jordenö, which documents ball culture.

MikeQ has released music with Fade To Mind, Qween Beat, Mad Decent and Night Slugs. He has also done production for Kelela, Future Brown, and Brodinski, among others.

MikeQ’s “Feel’s Like” Featuring ballroom commentator Kevin Jz Prodigy was sampled in 2022 on the Beyoncé “Renaissance” Album on the track “Pure/Honey”.

== Qween Beat ==
Qween Beat is a record label founded by MikeQ in 2012. It focuses on vogue and ballroom tracks, re-edits, and remixes. Qween Beat has put out releases with numerous artists including Divoli S'vere, Zebra Katz, Ash B., Jay R Neutron, and Koppi Mizrahi.

== Ambassador for ballroom ==
MikeQ has been an advocate for ballroom, often acting as an ambassador and steward for taking ballroom culture into the mainstream. He has also been a critic of its appropriation by corporations that do not understand or give proper credit to the ballroom community.
