= Dashaun Wesley =

American dancer, actor, choreographer, and ballroom performer

Dashaun Wesley is an American dancer, actor, choreographer, and ballroom performer, MC, and commentator. He is known for hosting the voguing competition series Legendary and for his appearances on the television series America's Best Dance Crew and Pose. He is often called the "King of Vogue".

== Early life ==
Wesley was born in Brooklyn, New York and grew up in its Bedford-Stuyvesant neighborhood. He began dancing at age four. Wesley first encountered voguing at 14 and became involved with the ballroom scene as a teenager.

== Career ==
Wesley has worked as a dance and vogue instructor.

=== Ballroom ===
Wesley became involved in ballroom as a teenager in the late 1990s and has competed in balls frequently since then, also hosting and commentating at balls. He began emceeing balls in 2003, and first performed voguing "in front of a big crowd" in 2005 or 2006. Wesley has been a member of a number of houses, including the House of Latex (which he joined in 2000), the House of Evisu, and the House of Lanvin, in which he was a father. He is the founder and father of the House of Basquiat, which debuted on the second season of Legendary in 2021. Along with the House of Garçons, he was featured in the 2023 Capital Pride parade in Washington, D.C.

He is a ballroom legend and received icon status in 2018.

=== Film and television ===
In 2009, Wesley competed on the fourth season of America's Best Dance Crew as a member of the group Vogue Evolution. In 2013, he appeared as a dancer on Hit the Floor. In 2015, Wesley appeared in the film Magic Mike XXL, for which he also instructed Channing Tatum in voguing. Later that year he was an ensemble member in The Wiz Live! Wesley played Shadow Wintour (also known as Shadow Khan) in seasons two and three of Pose on FX. In 2020, he was announced as the host of the HBO Max ballroom competition series Legendary, and served as host and MC over the show’s three seasons. In 2022, he was featured in Billy Porter's performance at the BET Awards. In 2024, Wesley hosted the Revry show The Halloween Ball with Jack Mizrahi.

=== Music ===
In 2013, Wesley was featured as a dancer in the music video for Fergie's song "A Little Party Never Killed Nobody (All We Got)". In 2015, he performed as a vogue dancer and commentator for FKA Twigs' show "Congregata". Wesley was a dancer for Rihanna's 2016 Anti World Tour and featured in Teyana Taylor's 2018 K.T.S.E. tour. He also appeared in the music video for Taylor's song "Work this Pussy".

Wesley is a member of MikeQ's label Qween Beat and was featured on the track "Walk" on its 2016 collection Qweendom. In 2023, he was featured on the song "Giant Bird in a Man Suit" on the cast recording of the off-Broadway musical Lewberger: The Wizard of Friendship. In 2024, Wesley released the song "Ovah the Top" featuring 808 BEACH and Kiwi Dreams. Later that year he was featured on the vogue remix of "Crazy" by Le Sserafim.

== Personal life ==
Wesley is gay and lives in Los Angeles.
