= Douglas Says =

American fashion designer and stylist (born 1961)

- Born: March 1961 (age 65); Newark, New Jersey, U.S.
- Occupations: Fashion designer; stylist; make-up artist; author
- Known for: Stretch fabric eveningwear; Work in ball culture

Douglas Says (born March 1961) is an American fashion designer, stylist, author, and make-up artist. He is known for using stretch fabrics in eveningwear and has worked with figures in the ballroom scene, including his longtime muse Tracey Africa Norman. In 2024, his work was included in the exhibition The Story of Newark Fashion: Atelier to Runway at The Newark Museum of Art. Says is the subject of the short documentary Miss Honey: The Catsuit (2024), directed by Brandon R. Nicholas, which premiered at NewFest. The film highlights the legacy of drag performer Moi Renée and features a catsuit designed by Says.

== Career ==
Raised in Newark, New Jersey, Says began designing clothing in the 1970s while attending high school. After taking a course in men's tailoring, he began producing garments for classmates and friends. He initially explored modeling but shifted his focus to design, eventually concentrating on women's clothing. By 1983, he had completed formal training in fashion design. In the 1980s and 1990s, Says was active in Newark's fashion and nightlife scenes, including drag pageants, ballroom events, and local discos. His clients have included model Iman, singer Celia Cruz, and runway coach J. Alexander. He has also worked with photographers including Gerard Gaskin, Mike Ruiz, Alex Chatelain, Ghillian Lewin, Fadil Berisha, Marc Baptiste, Dah Len, Keith Majors, Anthony Barboza, and Jerry Jack.

In the early 2000s, Says began presenting annual fashion shows in Newark. His work was featured in the Thurgood Marshall College Fund's annual fashion shows in 2007 and 2008. His collaborations with ballroom figures including Sinia, Danielle Revlon, Karen Covergirl, Octavia St. Laurent, and Tracey Africa Norman appear on Google Arts & Culture's Ballroom in Focus, photographed by Luna Luis Ortiz. Says introduced photographer Gerard Gaskin to the ballroom scene in 1993. Gaskin's first series, "Douglas' Girls," contributed to his 2013 book Legendary: Inside the House Ballroom Scene, which won the Center for Documentary Studies/Honickman First Book Prize.

Says has self-published two books: Amuse (2009), a collection of photographs featuring models in his garments, and The Red Dress (2013). His work has also appeared in Mainhattanmanhattan, NYC Go-Go by Slava Mogutin, The Way We Wore by Michael McCollom, and Queer Newark: Stories of Resistance, Love, and Community edited by Whitney Strub.

== Legacy ==
Says has been featured in Black Fashion History, Swerv Magazine, and the Vera Center for Arts and Politics. In 2007, his designs were included in the Black Style Now exhibition at the Museum of the City of New York. For The Story of Newark Fashion: Atelier to Runway, the Newark Museum of Art commissioned painter Mickalene Thomas to create a full-length portrait of Tracey Africa Norman wearing a Douglas Says gown.

Swerv magazine featured Says and Tracey "Africa" Norman on the cover of its September–October 2017 issue, profiling their decades-long friendship and collaboration.

Says lives in Newark, New Jersey, and remains active in local fashion and arts communities.

In their essay for the anthology Queer Newark: Stories of Resistance, Love, and Community, scholars Mary Rizzo and Christina Strasburger quote Says on the closing of Murphy's, a gay bar: "We have no place to go. There's no gay spots. None, absolutely none. Once Murphy's left, that was the last of it.... It's like we've been shunned, kicked—it's like we've been pushed back in the closet." Rizzo and Strasburger use his account to argue that venues like Murphy's served as vital social infrastructure for Black LGBTQ life in Newark, and that their closure represented contraction rather than progress.

== Miss Honey: The Catsuit ==
In 2024, Miss Honey: The Catsuit, a short documentary directed by Brandon R. Nicholas, traced the origins of Says's signature cut-out catsuit to Moi Renée's televised performance of "Miss Honey," later sampled on Beyoncé's Renaissance. The film screened at NewFest and Queer Voices: NYC Film Festival, and is intended as a proof of concept for a feature-length documentary about Renée.

Says has also contributed costume and wardrobe work to television and film, including Rip the Runway '11 (2011) and independent films Smooth the Game Is Dead, Don't Go to Strangers, and The System Within.

== Archives and collections ==
Says's work is held by several institutions. The Queer Newark Oral History Project at Rutgers University conducted an oral history interview with him, and the Fashion Institute of Technology has initiated archival projects preserving records of his design practice.
