= Moi Renée =

Jamaican-born singer and performer (died 1997)

- Moi Renée performing "Miss Honey"

Background information
- Born: Jamaica
- Origin: New York City, U.S.
- Died: 1997
- Genres: House music
- Occupations: Singer; performer
- Years active: Early 1990s–1997
- Labels: Project X Records; Slip 'n' Slide Records

Moi Renée (died 1997) was a Jamaican-born singer and performer active in New York City's underground queer nightlife scene in the early 1990s. Renée released the 1992 dance single "Miss Honey", one of the earliest "bitch tracks", a subgenre of house music. "Miss Honey" was later sampled by Beyoncé in her 2022 song "Pure/Honey".

== Early life ==
Renée was born in Jamaica. As a child, he (Note: The 1993 Village Voice profile, the only substantial source from Renée's lifetime, uses he/him pronouns. This article follows that usage. Friends and later commentators use she/her or they/them pronouns.) was known as Sam. He faced anti-gay harassment from a young age.

In 1971, Renée and his family emigrated to the US, settling in Philadelphia, where he was known as Peanut. In junior high school, he was physically and sexually assaulted. His first crush, a classmate named Keith, was shot and killed by a relative.

He moved to New York City in 1979, where he became known as Renée. His jobs included window designer at B. Dalton. By the early 1990s, he was studying at the Alvin Ailey American Dance Theater.

== Career ==
Renée was openly gay and visible in Flatbush, Brooklyn, a predominantly West Indian neighborhood: "If I feel like walking with a switch or behaving openly effeminate I do it... I feel proud to go out and be myself."

Renée appeared on the cover of a 1993 Village Voice issue; the accompanying story described him as a "singer, songwriter, dancer, actor, and comedian." He became a regular performer on New York City's queer club circuit, appearing at venues including Better Days, Midtown 43, One Hot Spot, and Tracks. Renée was the "reigning diva" of The Shelter, known for his camp late-night sets.

His personal style blended designer labels like Calvin Klein and Emilio Pucci, colorful barrettes, and Rasta colors with do-it-yourself creations like outfits made from caution tape. Renée performed in wigs and women's clothing, but rejected the drag queen label that later sources would apply to him: "I am not a drag queen."

=== "Miss Honey" ===
In 1992, Renée released "Miss Honey", a spoken-word dance track produced by Franklin Fuentes. The 12-inch single was released on Project X Records in the United States, followed by a UK pressing on Slip 'n' Slide Records in 1993. The track was widely played at gay clubs, tea dances, and balls.

The single has been described as one of the earliest "bitch tracks", a subgenre of house music built on boastful, confrontational vocals, often used for solo showcasing and voguing at balls. In February 1993, Billboard reviewed "Miss Honey" among a group of tracks with "a finger-snappin' female impersonator with talent for nasty 'bitch-talk'" which also included "Supermodel (You Better Work)" by RuPaul and "Get Her" by The Ride Committee Featuring Roxy.

Renée appeared on Stonewall Place After Dark, a late-night talk show on the Gay Cable Network, where he was interviewed and performed the song. He wore white lipstick, a towering green wig, and a black bodysuit by Douglas Says; two uninterested backup dancers flanked him onstage. Writing in 2008, Village Voice columnist Michael Musto called the clip "a tiny piece of gay history" and described the track as having become "a cult classic."

== Death ==
In 1997, Moi Renée was found dead in a hotel room. Authorities ruled the death a suicide, though some who knew him disputed that finding.

== Legacy ==
In 2003, house producers the Ride Committee released "Curtains for You (A Tribute to Moi Renée)" on Wave Music.

Throughout the 2000s and 2010s, "Miss Honey" was remixed and sampled by DJs, including Eats Everything, whose 2020 "Honey" used Renée's vocals.

In 2022, Beyoncé sampled "Miss Honey" in "Pure/Honey" on her album Renaissance and credited Renée as a songwriter. The Fader wrote that the sample "[ties] it all together at the end". Beyoncé paid tribute to Renée's performance of "Miss Honey" in a montage of different looks from a visual teaser for the album.

Renée is the subject of several collage works by mixed-media artist Beau McCall, which were exhibited at the Wallach Art Gallery and the Stonewall National Museum and Archives.

Miss Honey: The Catsuit (2024), a short documentary directed by Brandon R. Nicholas, traces the creation of the bodysuit Renée wore on Stonewall Place After Dark. It premiered at the aGLIFF Film Festival in Austin, Texas. Nicholas is developing a feature-length documentary about Renée.

== Discography ==
Singles
Year	Title	Label	Cat. No.	Format
1992	"Miss Honey"	Project X Records (US), Slip 'n' Slide Records (UK, 1993)	PX 10016, Kick 33	12"
Unknown	"Cum 4 Me ... Bitch !!!"	Joy Luv Records	JL-8004	12"

== See also ==
- LGBTQ culture in New York City
- List of LGBTQ people in New York City
