= Jade Elektra =

American activist and drag performer

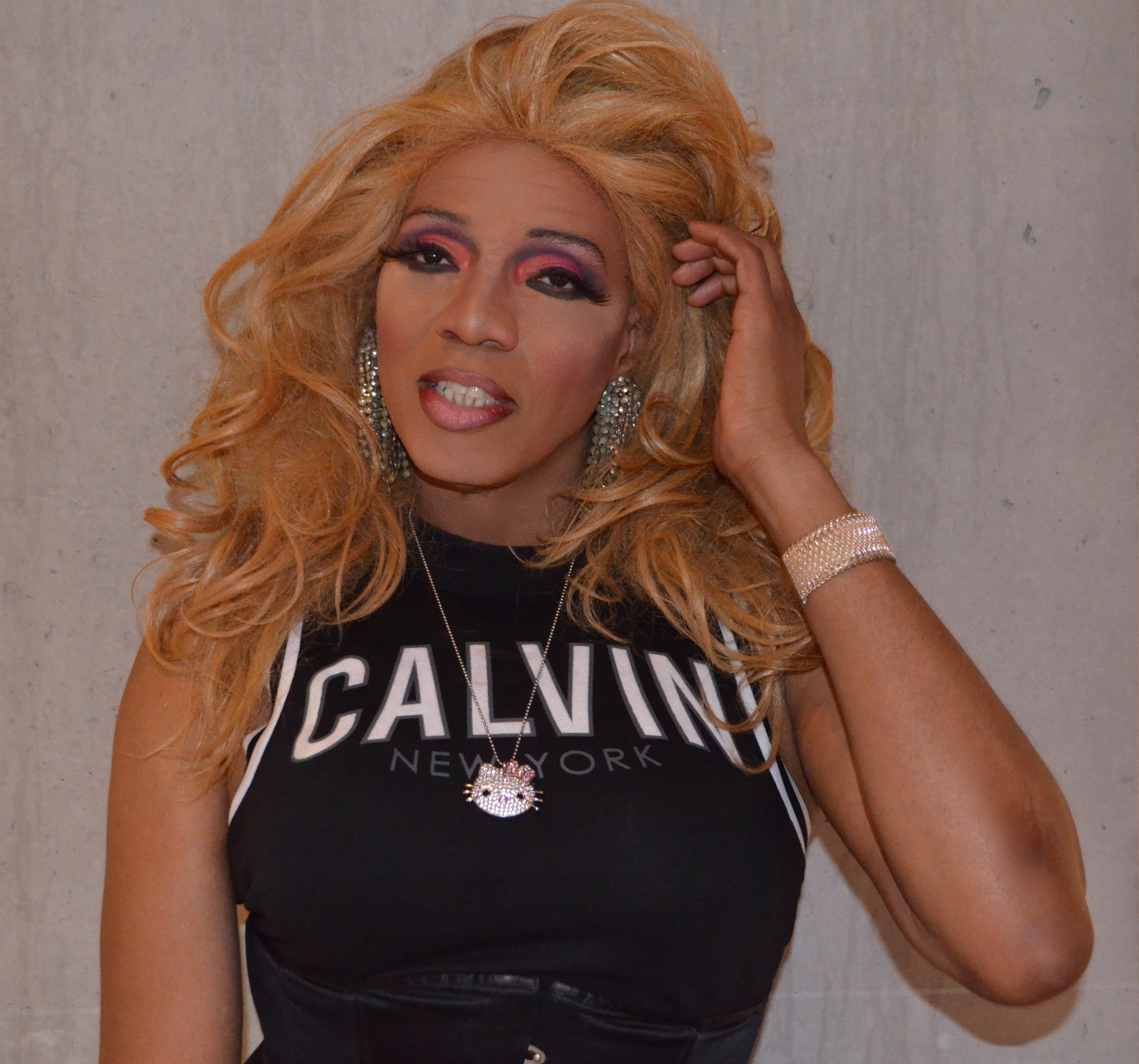

Background information
- Also known as: DJ Relentless
- Born: Alphonso King Jr. Ontario, Canada
- Origin: Toronto, Canada
- Occupations: Black queer, hiv activist, drag queen, singer, recording artist
- Spouse: John Richard Allan

Jade Elektra (born Alphonso King Jr.) is a Black queer and HIV activist, drag queen, singer, recording artist (DJ Relentless), and stage performer originally from Tampa, Florida, based in Toronto, Ontario, Canada. Jade is openly living with HIV and through activism and outreach, has strived to make a positive impact for HIV-positive, queer people of colour, and LGBTQ communities in Toronto and around the world. Jade is a founder of POZPLANET and POZ-TO, which fight HIV/AIDS stigma by hosting social events, partnering with AIDS Service Organizations, and fundraising for community-based HIV/AIDS organizations.

Jade is a Canadian Foundation for AIDS Research ambassador. Her local performance of "Undetectable," a rendition of the Nat King Cole's classic "Unforgettable," has led to her performing this song for the U=U (Undetectable = Untransmittable) campaign at various events, including the U.S. Conference on AIDS in Washington, D.C. in 2019.

Jade is married to John Richard Allan and lives in Toronto.

== Singles and tracks ==
All lyrics by Jade Elektra and on 2nd Level Records unless otherwise noted

=== "She Turns It" ===
- Original Mix
- Bask in my Lovely Dub

=== "What-Evah!" ===
- Original Mix

=== "Why Are You Gaggin'?" ===
2nd Level Records (US) / Progressive High Records (US)

- Original Mix
- Vjuan Allure Remix
- Cesar Murillo's Unreleased Cunty Vocal

=== "Bitch You Look Fierce" ===
2008 2nd Level Records (US) / Filthy Bitch Records (UK)

- Original Mix
- Chip Chop's Jungle Feedback Vocal Dub
- Dirty Bitch Dub
- Jon-E Industry's Fugly Remix
- Josh Riptide Anthem
- Vjuan Allure Remix

=== "Proud Mary" ===
- Original Mix

=== "Walk on the Wild Side" ===
Written and originally recorded by Lou Reed Additional lyrics by Jade Elektra.

- Original Mix

=== "Trade" ===
2nd Level Records (US) / Soundgroove Records (US) Performed by Jade Elektra and Jason Ryan

- Original Mix
- Midnight Society Streetwalker Mix

=== "I Wanna Be Loved By You" ===
Performed by Jade Elektra and Paul Manchin

- Original Mix

=== "This Is What We Call A Bitch Track" ===
- Original Mix

=== "If I Were A Woman" ===
- Original Mix

=== "You Bettah Muthaphuckin' Feel It" ===
- Original Mix

=== "How Do I Look?" ===
2005 2nd Level Records (US) / Pure Music Productions (US) Performed by Jade Elektra and Midnight Society

- Original Mix (Music from the documentary film How Do I Look)

=== "Don't Explain" ===
Written by Billie Holiday and Arthur Herzog Jr.

- Felly's 2-Step House Mix
- Josh Riptide Elektroboogie Mix
- Josh Riptide Radio Edit
- Scott Harris' No Explanation Mix

=== "RIF (Reading Is Fundamental)" ===
- Vjuan Allure Mix
- Joellapussy Remix

=== "H-I-Vogue" ===
- Vjuan Allure Elite Bump Mix
- DJ Fierce Tease Freshly Served Vocal Mix
- DJ Fierce Tease Freshly Served Radio Edit
- Chip Chop's Big Room Dub
- Vjuan Allure's Waiting Room Mix

=== "Come Get This Education" ===
© 2015 Ber'lin Records Jade Elektra & The Philthkids

All lyrics are written by Jade Elektra.

"Come Get This Education" track listing
No.	Title	Length
1.	"Come Get This Education"
2.	"Come Get This Education" (B-Side Mix)
3.	"Come Get This Education" (Walk Dub)

=== "Scared Of Evolution: The Remixes" ===
© 2016 Ber'lin Records

All lyrics are written by Jade Elektra.

"Scared Of Evolution: The Remixes" track listing
No.	Title	Length
1.	"Scared Of Evolution" (Trap Mix)
2.	"Scared Of Evolution" (Whispering Stormtroopers Mix)
3.	"Scared Of Evolution" (Ever Evolving Mix)

=== "Don't Get It Twisted" ===
© 2016 Ber'lin Records

All lyrics are written by Jade Elektra.

"Don't Get It Twisted" track listing
No.	Title	Length
1.	"Don't Get It Twisted"

=== "Re-Respect Yourself" ===
© 2016 Ber'lin Records

All lyrics are written by Jade Elektra.

"Re-Respect Yourself" track listing
No.	Title	Length
1.	"Re-Respect Yourself" (Rock Bottom Dub)
2.	"Re-Respect Yourself" (Cris Is Bliss Remix)
3.	"Re-Respect Yourself" (Rock Bottom Mix)
4.	"Re-Respect Yourself" (Blissfully Jaded Mix)
5.	"Re-Respect Yourself" (Cris Is Bliss Radio Edit)

=== "How Do I Look 2.0" ===
© 2017 iUnderground Records

All lyrics are written by Jade Elektra.

"How Do I Look 2.0" track listing
No.	Title	Length
1.	"How Do I Look 2.0" (Erik Elias Mix)

=== "Reading Glasses (Dub)" single ===
© 2018 iUnderground Records

All lyrics are written by Jade Elektra.

"Reading Glasses (Dub)" track listing
No.	Title	Length
1.	"Reading Glasses" (Dub Mix)

== Albums & extended plays ==
=== Are You Gaggin' Yet? ===
1998 2nd Level Records

All lyrics are written by Jade Elektra.

Are You Gaggin' Yet? track listing
No.	Title	Writer(s)	Length
1.	"Bitch You Look Fierce"
2.	"Walk On The Wild Side"	Lou Reed
3.	"What-Evah!"
4.	"Why Are You Gaggin'?"
5.	"Why Are You Gaggin'?" (House Mix)
6.	"She Turns It"
7.	"She Turns It" (Dub Mix)
8.	"This Is What We Call A Bitch Track"

=== Proud Mary ===
© 2001 2nd Level Records

All lyrics are written by Jade Elektra.

Proud Mary track listing
No.	Title	Writer(s)	Length
1.	"Proud Mary"	John Fogerty
2.	"Bitch You Look Fierce"
3.	"Walk On The Wild Side"	Lou Reed
4.	"What-Evah!"
5.	"She Turns It"
6.	"Why Are You Gaggin'?"
7.	"Trade" (Duet with Jason Ryan)
8.	"I Wanna Be Loved By You" (Duet with Paul Manchin)
9.	"This Is What We Call A Bitch Track"
10.	"If I Were A Woman"

=== Bitch You Look Fierce ===
© 2002 2nd Level Records

All lyrics are written by Jade Elektra.

Bitch You Look Fierce track listing
No.	Title	Writer(s)	Length
1.	"Bitch You Look Fierce" (Original Mix)
2.	"Bitch You Look Fierce" (Josh Riptide Anthem)
3.	"Bitch You Look Fierce" (Dirty Bitch Dub Mix)
4.	"Trade"" (duet with Jason Ryan – Original Mix)
5.	"Trade" (duet with Jason Ryan – Cleo's Mix)
6.	"Trade"" (duet with Jason Ryan – Josh Riptide's Workin' Hard Club Mix)
7.	"Proud Mary" (Original Mix)	John Fogerty
8.	"Proud Mary" (Sam Pena's Monster Anthem)	John Fogerty
9.	"If I Were A Woman" (Original Mix)
10.	"I Wanna Be Loved By You" (duet with Paul Manchin)

=== Proud Mary: 10th Anniversary Edition ===
© 2011 2nd Level Records

All lyrics are written by Jade Elektra.

Proud Mary: 10th Anniversary Edition track listing
No.	Title	Length
1.	"Proud Mary" (Sam Pena Remix Edit)
2.	"Bitch You Look Fierce" (Radio Edit)
3.	"Walk On The Wild Side"
4.	"What-Evah!"
5.	"She Turns It" (Cleo's Dub Mix)
6.	"Why Are You Gaggin'?" (Radio Edit)
7.	"Trade" (Duet with Jason Ryan – Cleo's Album Edit)
8.	"I Wanna Be Loved By You" (Duet with Paul Manchin)
9.	"This Is What We Call A Bitch Track"
10.	"If I Were A Woman" (Album Edit)
11.	"Don't Explain" (Felly's 2-Step House Mix – bonus track)
12.	"How Do I Look?" (Jade Elektra & Midnight Society – Relentless Tribute Edit – bonus track)
13.	"You Better Feel It" (Ken Terry & Relentless Runway Dub – bonus track)
14.	"R.I.F. (Reading Is Fundamental)" (Joelapussy Remix Edit – bonus track)
15.	"HIVogue" (Fierce Tease Freshly Served Vocal Radio Edit – bonus track)

=== A Intimate Evening With Jade Elektra ===
© 2012 2nd Level Records, live In Concert at Statlers, Toronto

All lyrics are written by Jade Elektra.

A Intimate Evening With Jade Elektra track listing
No.	Title	Writer(s)	Length
1.	"Introduction by Marcy Rogers" (Toronto Playwright)
2.	"What You Won't Do For Love"
3.	"Bitch You Look Fierce"
4.	"Let's Stay Together"
5.	"This Masquerade"
6.	"Don't Explain"
7.	"You Know I'm No Good"
8.	"Come In From The Rain"
9.	"Since I Fell For You"
10.	"All Of Me" (duet with Jennifer Walls)
11.	"You Don't Bring Me Flowers" (duet with Ryan G. Hinds)	Neil Diamond, Alan and Marilyn Bergman
12.	"Sweet Transvestite"
13.	"Summertime" (Encore)

=== Jade Does Ber'lin EP ===
© 2014 Ber'lin Records

All lyrics are written by Jade Elektra.

Jade Does Ber'lin track Listing
No.	Title	Length
1.	"I Was Born This Way / Respect Yourself" (Relentless Blissful House Edit)
2.	"Bitch This Way"
3.	"I Was Born This Way / Bitch This Way / Respect Yourself" (Club Night Compilation)
4.	"I Was Born This Way" (Erik Elias Remix)
5.	"I Was Born This Way" (Radio Mix)
6.	"Respect Yourself" (Erik Elias Remix)
7.	"Respect Yourself" (Nostalgic Mix)
8.	"I Was Born This Way / Respect Yourself" (Almost a Cappella)

=== Karma EP ===
© 2015 Ber'lin Records

All lyrics are written by Jade Elektra.

Karma track Listing
No.	Title	Length
1.	"Karma (It's A Bitch)" (Radio Edit)
2.	"Karma (It's A Bitch)" (Legends Mix)
3.	"Karma (It's A Bitch)" (Eastern Bloc Mix)
4.	"Karma (It's A Bitch)" (Dopamine Mix)
5.	"Karma (It's A Bitch)" (Lectra Beats)
6.	"Karma (It's A Bitch)" (Original Mix)
7.	"Karma (It's A Bitch)" (Machine Mix)
8.	"Scared Of Evolution" (Erik Elias Revolutionary Mix)
9.	"Scared Of Evolution" (Electric Funk Mix)
10.	"Scared Of Evolution" (E. Funk Instrumentality)
11.	"Scared Of Evolution" (Extraordinary Negro Mix)

=== Basic Bitch (Remixes) EP ===
© 2018 Aviance Records

All lyrics are written by Jade Elektra.

Basic Bitch (Remixes) track listings
No.	Title	Length
1.	"Basic Bitch" (Vjuan Allure Mix)
2.	"Basic Bitch" (David Ohana Aviance Club Mix)
3.	"Basic Bitch" (Vjuan Allure The Girls Mix)
4.	"Basic Bitch" (David Ohana Aviance Dub Mix)
