= Get Huh! =

1993 song by The Ride Committee featuring Roxy

Single by The Ride Committee featuring Roxy
- Released: 1993
- Genre: House
- Length: 5:26
- Label: E-Legal
- Songwriters: Louie Guzman; Steven A. Jones
- Producer: Louie "Balo" Guzman

The Ride Committee featuring Roxy singles chronology
"Get Huh!" (1993)	"Love to Do It" (1994)

"Get Huh!" (also simply "Get Huh" and "Get Her") is a 1993 house song by The Ride Committee, (Note: The Ride Committee was the studio project of producer Louie "Balo" Guzman, a Connecticut-born DJ of Colombian descent who worked at D&D Studios. The project had two other singles place on the UK Dance Singles Chart: "Love to Do It", #33 in September 1994 and "Accident", #38 in September 1995.) featuring vocals by Roxy. (Note: Roxy was the stage name of Steven A. Jones (1966–2020), credited as a writer of "Get Huh!".) It was written by Louie Guzman and Steven A. Jones and produced by Guzman. E-Legal Records issued the song on a 12-inch single in 1993, with a remix by Junior Vasquez. It reached number 40 on the UK Dance Singles Chart in September 1994.

== Composition ==
"Get Huh!" set a spoken-word monologue of snide insults delivered by Roxy over a house beat, in the genre of the "bitch track" or "drag disco" releases that emerged in New York in the early 1990s. The track is built around "hysterically catty comments" such as "she's got really dreadful skin", "she's got Ethel Merman's chins", and "I'll rip out her eyes and put them in the punchbowl!"

== Release ==
In a February 1993 Billboard roundup of new "drag disco" records, dance editor Larry Flick called "Get Her" "easily the best of the bunch" and reported that "several majors are sniffing around" the record for a deal. Although bootleg copies had circulated ahead of the track's official release, the label had maintained interest in it.

== Critical reception ==
Flick named "Get Her" the fifth-best dance record of 1993 in Billboard's year-end critics' list, and German magazine Spex included it among the top house tracks of the year. In 2021, The Guardian's Alexis Petridis identified "Get Huh!" and "Walk for Me" by Tronco Traxx as part of "the fierce strain of 90s New York house".

== Track listing ==
All tracks are written by Louie "Balo" Guzman and Steven A. Jones

12-inch single (E-Legal ELS845214, US)
No.	Title	Length
1.	"Get Huh! (The New Mix)" (remixed by Junior Vasquez)	8:26
2.	"Get Huh! (Accapella)"	3:43
3.	"Get Huh! (Original Mix)"	5:26
4.	"Get Huh! (Techno Mix)" (remixed by Davidson Ospina and Roc & Kato)	6:33

== Credits and personnel ==
- Roxy – vocals
- Louie "Balo" Guzman – production
- Louie "Balo" Guzman, Steven A. Jones – songwriting
- Junior Vasquez – remix ("The New Mix")

== Charts ==
Weekly chart performance for "Get Huh!"
Chart (1994)	Peak position
UK Dance Singles (OCC)	40

== See also ==
- LGBTQ culture in New York City
- Moi Renée, performer of the "bitch track" "Miss Honey"
