= Tracey Norman =

American fashion model (born 1952)

- Born: Tracey Gayle Norman; December 14, 1952 (age 73); Newark, New Jersey, U.S.
- Other name: Tracey Africa
- Occupation: Model
- Years active: 1972–present
- Known for: First African-American trans woman in mainstream fashion modeling; Clairol "Born Beautiful" campaign
- Height: 1.77 m (5 ft 9 1/2 in)

Tracey "Africa" Norman, a.k.a. Tracey Africa, is an American fashion model and the first African-American trans woman to achieve prominence in the industry. Originally from Newark, New Jersey, Norman has appeared in Essence, Vogue Italia, and Harper's Bazaar India. In 2015, New York published a cover story on her life and career.

== Early life ==
Tracey Norman was born in Newark, New Jersey, in 1952. She identified as a woman from a young age, later stating, "I always felt inside, since far back as I can remember, that I was female." As a child, she studied the women in her life, including teachers and female family members, to learn feminine traits. She was a shy, quiet child and the first person in her family to graduate high school. At a young age, Norman was sexually molested by an older neighbor.

In middle school, she and her family survived the 1967 Newark riots, and she remembers seeing army tanks on the street outside their home in the predominantly Jewish neighborhood of Weequahic. She attended Clinton Place Junior High. Norman mostly lived with her mother, but for a few years in middle school, lived with her father. Her art teacher introduced her to theater, and she met the actress Pearl Bailey. Her parents, both professional bowlers, met at a bowling alley in Newark and would take Norman and her sister bowling as children. Her mother eventually got a job in the County Food Stamp Department, where she worked for 25 years. In summers, Norman visited family in North Carolina. In high school, she attended North Tech and learned to work on cars; her interest had developed earlier, when she drove her grandfather's car. On the day of her high school graduation in 1972, she came out to her mother, who was supportive.

== Career ==
=== Early modeling (early 1970s–1975) ===
In the early 1970s, two years after graduating high school, Norman began modeling in the Newark area, working with makeup artist Al Grundy and Grundy's brother, a fashion designer. She and other young women practiced walking in Grundy's hallway to learn the runway. For a few years, she modeled in Newark and New York, attending fashion shows and gaining experience. She practiced her runway walk extensively because she is mildly bowlegged. To get into fashion shows, she told people she was a student at the Fashion Institute of Technology.

In 1975, Norman was discovered by photographer Irving Penn. She had not been invited to a photo shoot but was swept up in a crowd of models and found herself being photographed by Penn for Vogue Italia. Soon after, she began working with the magazine, earning $1,500 a day (equivalent to $9,000 in 2025).

=== Mainstream success (1975–1980) ===
Norman quickly found work across the country. She was billed as the "young Beverly Johnson." She modeled in Chicago, New York, Las Vegas, and Miami, doing hair commercials and catalogue work, and appeared in fashion shows at Newark Symphony Hall.

She moved to New York, and two years later appeared on the box of Clairol's "Born Beautiful" hair color No. 512, Dark Auburn. She did not disclose that she was transgender, and landed an exclusive contract with Avon for a skin care line. As her profile rose, she worried about being outed. She preferred working with white brands but took a job with Essence in pursuit of her first magazine cover.

=== Outing and career loss (1980) ===
In 1980, while on a photo shoot for Essence in which she was modeling as Cleopatra, a hairdresser's assistant discovered that she was transgender and told the editor, Susan Taylor.

The next day, Norman could not find work. Her photos were not published, and no company would hire her. She went to see her agent, Zoli, who dropped her, citing her hips as too big, though she was a size 6. Essence did not pay her for the shoot. She moved back to her mother's house in Newark and worked local shows for a while.

=== Paris ===
Norman moved to Paris with two friends who were also models. They arrived in the off-season and struggled financially, taking turns paying rent and eating sandwiches of bread, French fries, and mustard.

She found work at The Palace, where she and two other models performed as the Supremes at tea dances. She later signed a six-month contract with Balenciaga.

=== Ballroom career ===
When her Balenciaga contract ended, Norman found little work in Milan and returned to New York, signing with Grace del Marco Agency. The agency provided few bookings, and Norman took a job at Show Center, performing in a burlesque peep show.

Norman became active in the ballroom scene. She had attended balls in New York in the 1970s but found the scene unwelcoming; she was more accepted in New Jersey. In the late 1980s and 1990s, she competed in categories including face, body, and runway, winning attention for her modeling walk.

In 1990, she joined the House of Africa, adopting the middle name "Africa." She was eventually voted in as "mother" of the house, a position she held for two or three years. She has won trophies in New York, New Jersey, Baltimore, Washington, and Atlanta, and was inducted into the ballroom hall of fame in 2001.

=== Career resurgence (2015–) ===
In December 2015, New York's digital fashion site The Cut published a profile of Norman. Clairol subsequently reached out to her, and in 2016 announced that she would become the face of their "Nice 'n Easy Color As Real As You Are" campaign.

In 2016, Norman and Geena Rocero became the first openly transgender models to appear on the cover of Harper's Bazaar. That year, she also appeared in a Lexus commercial and the film Lady Seven Sings, and was interviewed by The Times of London and Marie Claire South Africa.

== Personal life ==
Norman has said she identified as a woman from an early age. In a 2015 cover story for New York, she said, "It just seemed like I was living in the wrong body. I always felt female."

On the day of her high school graduation, Norman came out to her mother, who embraced her. Her mother said she had always known. Norman began transitioning shortly after. She later learned from a former classmate that she could take birth control pills to feminize her body, and eventually found a doctor who provided hormone injections. A year after graduation, she felt able to present as a woman in public.

After transitioning, she began attending queer bars and clubs in Newark, including Le Joc and Murphy's.

Norman has collaborated with designer Douglas Says for several decades, serving as his muse. In 2022, the Newark Museum of Art acquired a full-length portrait of Norman in a Douglas Says gown, painted by Mickalene Thomas, for an exhibition on Newark's contributions to fashion.

In a 2021 interview, Norman said she does not identify as transgender, but simply as a woman: "I've always identified as being a woman. It was New York mag and the London Times and Marie Claire that put the word trans and attached it to my name."

== In popular culture ==
A storyline in the television series Pose was inspired by Norman's rejection by Playboy and The Oprah Winfrey Show. Laverne Cox paid tribute to Norman, alongside Tina Turner and Beyoncé, in the October 2016 issue of Cosmopolitan.
