= Samuel Goldwyn Theater =

Movie theater in Beverly Hills, California

Samuel Goldwyn Theatre
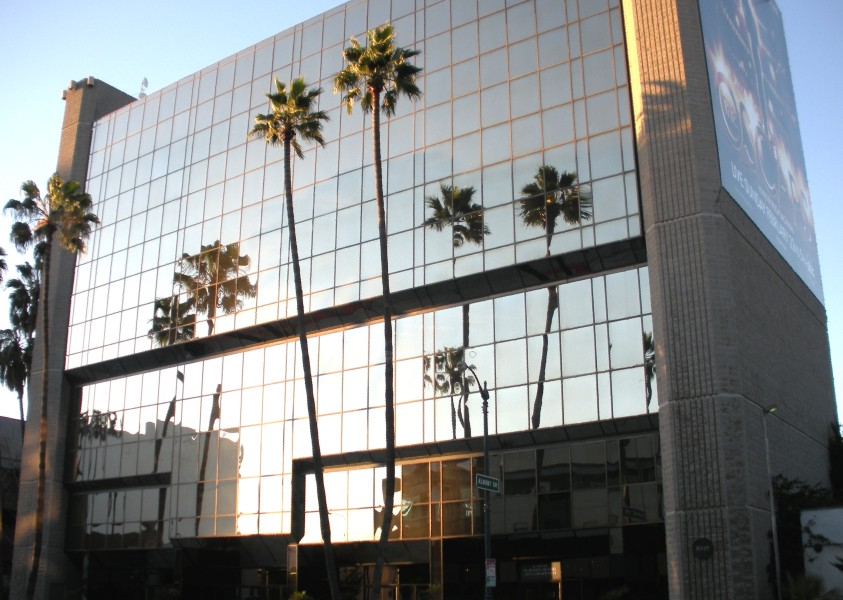
- Interactive map of Samuel Goldwyn Theatre
- Location: Beverly Hills, California
- Coordinates: 34°04′02″N 118°23′15″W
- Type: screening-only movie theater

The Samuel Goldwyn Theatre is a screening-only movie theater named after filmmaker Samuel Goldwyn.

It is located at 8949 Wilshire Boulevard, Beverly Hills, California, at headquarters of the Academy of Motion Picture Arts and Sciences (AMPAS). The Academy uses this theater each January most years to announce the nominations for its Academy Awards.

The following films premiered in the Samuel Goldwyn Theatre: Terminator 2: Judgment Day (1991), Raju Chacha (2000), Gladiator (2000), A Beautiful Mind (2001), Black Hawk Down (2001), A.I. Artificial Intelligence (2001), Moulin Rouge! (2001), Narc (2002), Wimbledon (2004), Eternal Sunshine of the Spotless Mind (2004), 127 Hours (2010), The Descendants (2011), All the Money in The World (2017), Babylon (2022), The Boys in the Boat (2023) and Renaissance: A Film by Beyoncé (2023).
