= Ain't Nobody Got Time for That =

2012 viral video

- Screenshot from the viral video
- Starring: Kimberly "Sweet Brown" Wilkins
- Narrated by: Joleen Chaney
- Distributed by: KFOR-TV; YouTube
- Release date: April 8, 2012
- Running time: 42 seconds
- Country: United States
- Language: English

Ain't Nobody Got Time for That is a viral YouTube video of Kimberly "Sweet Brown" Wilkins being interviewed after having escaped a fire in an apartment complex and breathed in smoke that gave her bronchitis. It originally aired on April 8, 2012, on Oklahoma City NBC affiliate KFOR-TV.

The video garnered Sweet Brown many appearances on television, including a visit to ABC's The View. Brown also plays a cameo role in the Tyler Perry Christmas comedy film A Madea Christmas (2013) saying a part of her line from her television interview during an interview at the end of the movie. In a slightly modified version broadcast on Jimmy Kimmel Live!, it was edited as if she was being interviewed by Jesus himself.

== Critical analysis ==
Charles E. Williams, writing for the Huffington Post, opined that the humor evoked by Sweet Brown's interview should stay within the confines of the black community, linking it to the "code-switching" phenomenon W. E. B. Du Bois spoke of.

== Lawsuit ==
In April 2013, Sweet Brown filed a $15 million lawsuit against Apple for selling a Bob Rivers song called "I Got Bronchitis" on iTunes for profit, using catchphrases uttered by her in the video, such as "Ain't nobody got time for that", "Ran for my life," and "Said oh, Lord Jesus, it's a fire!". This lawsuit was later dismissed without prejudice.

== Jimmy Kimmel parody ==
In March 2014, variety show Jimmy Kimmel Live did a parody of the video in the style of a film trailer. The plot is Sweet Brown going through some moments in history and being responsible for things such as Barack Obama getting into politics and Steve Jobs founding Apple. It starred Queen Latifah as Sweet Brown, Barkhad Abdi as Barack Obama and Adam Driver as Steve Jobs. In the end, it features Matt Damon doing an interview when the real Sweet Brown comes in and interrupts him with her catchphrase.
