= Schwarz (musician) =

American producer/DJ

Adam Schwarz formerly known as Schwarz before releasing singles under the alias So Drove is a touring, performer, musician, producer, and DJ currently based in Los Angeles after spending years in the underground Baltimore music scene.

== Life and career ==
=== Pre-2017: Schwarz early years ===
Schwarz is a native of St. Louis where he started singing songs in elementary school. By his middle school years, he produced his first full-length CD. He moved to Baltimore, Maryland where he started producing high-energy club and Baltimore club-inspired music. He has produced music for rapper Lil B. Schwarz and 333 Boyz produced the a beat used in Lil B.'s mixtape Hoop Life. Schwarz worked with musicians such as TT the Artist, and 3lon. Schwarz has remixed Matmos and created a mix for Tiny Mix Tapes. In 2014, Schwarz released a Ferguson unrest inspired Baltimore club style song titled "Hands Up Don't Shoot." The summer of 2014, Abdul Ali and Schwarz produced a collaborative EP, "Already" which was released October that same year. In Baltimore, the pair started the Motivational Tour for the EP with New Jersey DJ Kilbourne. The tour consisted of 22 shows in different cities across the U.S. including Boston.

Schwartz Schwarz released his debut EP, Everyday Is a Winding Road, in 2016. It features guest appearances from Kreayshawn and Blaqstarr.

=== 2017–present: So Drove ===
In 2017, Schwarz began producing music under the new alias So Drove. He released the single "Get Ya Shine On" in collaboration with Cupcakke, Kreayshawn, and TT the Artist. A music video directed by James Thomas Marsh and features all three artists and So Drove on guitar.
