= Pure/Honey =

2022 song by Beyoncé

Song by Beyoncé

from the album Renaissance
- Released: July 29, 2022
- Studio: Juicy Juicy; Kings Landing West; Parkwood West (Los Angeles)
- Genre: Ballroom; house; dance-pop; disco
- Length: 4:48
- Label: Parkwood; Columbia
- Songwriters: Beyoncé; Dixson; Michael Pollack; Michael Tucker; Denisia Andrews; Brittany Coney; Terrius Nash; Raphael Saadiq; Eric Snead; Jerel Black; Michael Cox; Kevin Bellmon; Richard Cowie; Count Maurice; Moi Renée
- Producers: Beyoncé; BloodPop; Nova Wav

Lyric Video
- "Pure/Honey" on YouTube

"Pure/Honey" is a song recorded by American singer Beyoncé. It is the fifteenth track on her seventh studio album, Renaissance (2022), which was released on July 29, 2022, through Parkwood and Columbia. It was written by Beyoncé, Nova Wav, BloodPop, Dixson, Michael Pollack, The-Dream and Raphael Saadiq, and produced by Beyoncé, Nova Wav and BloodPop.

== Composition ==
It is a love letter. It's a love letter to my community, the Black gay community. And the gay community too, but I'm not going to be pussyfooting. I'm trying not to call people out or anything like that. All I'm saying is that it's a bit different [being] Black and gay in America. When someone like Beyoncé [sees you] ... it's incredible. There's so many kids that have a hard time. I'm very lucky. I have a beautiful mom, a beautiful dad, and they love me, I love them. But there are a lot of kids who don't have that and are kicked out of their homes. So if someone like Beyoncé can make their day better because she is embracing all of that and a bag of chips, Miss Thing, and just carrying and looking ovuh and amazing, very confident about it and not wish-washing, then that's beautiful.

— Kevin Aviance on "Pure/Honey"

Similar to many songs in Beyoncé's career, the song consists of two parts, "Pure", a "steely and sexy" ballroom track, and "Honey", a "paisley and passionate" disco track.

"Pure" samples "Feels Like" written and performed by MikeQ & Kevin Jz Prodigy as well as "Cunty (Wave Mix)", written by Eric Snead and Jerel Black and performed by Kevin Aviance. This section features sharp synth-bass-led instrumentation with Beyoncé rapping in the same vein as a ballroom emcee.

"Honey" samples "Miss Honey" written by Andrew Richardson, Count Maurice and Moi Renée, and performed by Moi Renée. It features Beyoncé singing over a "soulful", funk-influenced brass production, done by Raphael Saadiq. This section was compared to Beyoncé's 2013 track "Blow".

The track had additional production by Saadiq, The-Dream, Stuart White and Mike Dean.

I had a tube in the 251 mic going bad during recording. It was noisy, and at first I was like: '[...] I'm gonna have to use noise reduction software and hope it still sounds right.' Then I realised that in the context of the song it was kinda cool, so I made it work. [...] I added compression, and this brought up the room sound, and I also added some McDSP FutzBox saturation, and it became part of the effect.

— Stuart White on producing "Pure/Honey".

== Critical reception ==
In a ranking made by Billboard, Kyle Denis ranked the song at number six, calling the second half of the song an "overall highlight" in Beyonce's career and praising her versatility of going from "full ball emcee" to a "funky, sultry vocal performance".

Julianne Escobedo Shepherd, a writer at Pitchfork, called the track "stunning", saying it braided together years of ballroom culture. Jordan Danville of The Fader compared the second half of the song's vocal melodies and funkiness to Janet Jackson and Prince respectively. In a review by Rolling Stone, Will Dukes commended the song, deeming it a "vogue-friendly bop" that showcased Beyoncé's vocal abilities that was reminiscent of Etta James and Tina Turner.

Craig Jenkins of Vulture wrote that along with many other songs on the parent album, "Pure/Honey" illustrated Black dance music history, saying it "juxtaposed '80s radio pop, brash beats, braggadocious commentation of ballroom competitions, and rhythmic gymnastics of New York rap".

== Use in other media ==
In 2024 the song was use by Rabanne for the Million Gold For Her fragrance campaign directed by Mert Alas and Manu Cossu, with Gigi Hadid as ambassador. Tamara Santillán of Elle Mexico wrote that the song, "seems to be created for the perfume thanks to the verse that goes, 'It should cost a billion to look this good.'" Marie Claudel of Harper's Bazaar France wrote that the song represented the message of the campaign about "the ultimate anthem of female empowerment and success".

== Commercial performance ==
After the release of Renaissance, "Pure/Honey" debuted on the Billboard Hot 100 chart at number 64 and on the Hot R&B/Hip-Hop Songs chart at number 26.

== Personnel and credits ==
=== Samples ===
- contains a sample of "Miss Honey", written by Andrew Richardson, Count Maurice, and Moi Renée and performed by Moi Renée.
- contains a sample of "Cunty (Wave Mix)", written by Eric Snead and Jerel Black and performed by Kevin Aviance.
- contains a sample of "Feels Like", written by Michael Cox and Kevin Bellmon and performed by MikeQ & Kevin Jz Prodigy.

=== Recording locations ===
- Kings Landing West (Los Angeles, California)
- The Juicy Juicy (Los Angeles, California)
- Parkwood West (Los Angeles, California)

=== Personnel ===
Performers

- Vocals by Beyoncé
- Background vocals by Dixson and Blu June

Musicians

- Beyoncé – drum programming, horn
- Lee Blaske – strings
- Bloodpop – drum programming
- The-Dream – additional drums
- Keyon Harrold – trumpet
- Kenneth Whalum – saxophone
- Stuart White – additional drums

Technical credits

- Beyoncé – production, vocal production
- Bloodpop – co-production
- Matheus Braz – assistant engineering
- Chi Coney – engineering
- John Cranfield – engineering
- Hotae Alexander Jang – recording, assistant engineering
- NovaWav – production
- Andrea Roberts – engineering
- Stuart White – mixing, recording

== Live performance ==
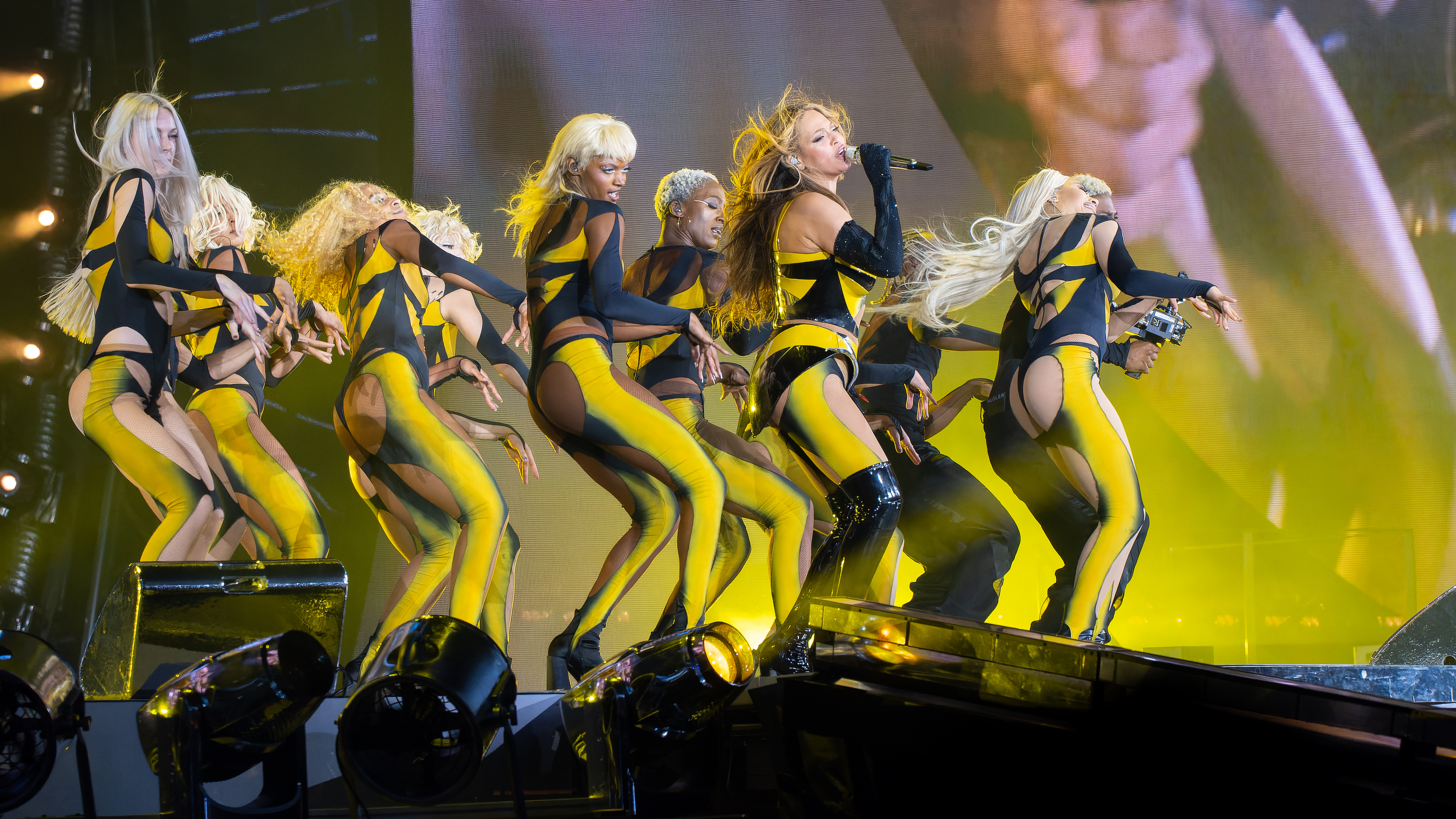
Beyoncé performing "Honey"-part on the Renaissance World Tour in 2023

Beyoncé first performed "Pure/Honey" in Stockholm, Sweden on the opening night of the Renaissance World Tour. The song takes place in the "Mind Control" act of the tour, following "America Has a Problem". The performance begins with an introduction by Kevin Jz Prodigy, calling Beyoncé the "Mother of the House of Renaissance". During this introduction, a fish-eye lensed selfie camera is brought to Beyoncé, which is then held by her while her and her dancers are voguing. During the "Honey" portion of the performance, Beyoncé includes elements of "Blow".

The "Honey" portion returned for the Cowboy Carter Tour in 2025 in a mashup with "Sweet Honey Buckiin" and "Summer Renaissance." Beyoncé sung the first verse of the song to Cowboy Carter's "Honey" instrumental before transitioning to its original Renaissance tune.

== Charts ==
=== Weekly charts ===
Weekly chart performance for "Pure/Honey"
Chart (2022)	Peak position
Canada Hot 100 (Billboard)	77
Global 200 (Billboard)	62
Portugal (AFP)	130
South Africa Streaming (TOSAC)	47
US Billboard Hot 100	64
US Hot R&B/Hip-Hop Songs (Billboard)	26

=== Year-end charts ===
2022 year-end chart performance for "Pure/Honey"
Chart (2022)	Position
US Hot Dance/Electronic Songs (Billboard)	29

2023 year-end chart performance for "Pure/Honey"
Chart (2023)	Position
US Hot Dance/Electronic Songs (Billboard)	99

== Certifications ==
Certifications and sales for "Pure/Honey"
Region	Certification	Certified units/sales
Brazil (Pro-Música Brasil)	2× Platinum	80,000^{‡}
United States (RIAA)	Gold	500,000^{‡}
^{‡} Sales+streaming figures based on certification alone.
