= Kevin Jz Prodigy =

American Ballroom commentator, music producer

- "Cunt in a Box", from Kevin Jz Prodigy's 2005 album "I Am Not a Homosexual"

Background information
- Origin: Philadelphia
- Genres: Ballroom
- Instrument: MCing
- Years active: 2002-present

Kevin Jz Prodigy is a Ballroom commentator, music producer and singer from Philadelphia.

In 1997, he discovered the Ballroom scene when friends took him to a club. He then learned how to vogue and joined the House of Movado. He started making music and commentating at balls in the early 2000s.

Prodigy's songs “Here Comes the Hurricane Legendary Katrina” and “Bam Bam Shawam” have been popularized by TikTok. In 2020, he launched the #IAmAWomanChallenge to encourage Ballroom dancers to post videos while the clubs where they usually performed were closed. His song "FA FA FA FEMININ" was used in the film presenting Mugler's Spring/Summer 2022 collection.

He was featured on the song Pure/Honey on Beyoncé's 2022 Renaissance album, has lent his voice on her tour and he is featured in Renaissance: A Film by Beyoncé.

Prodigy was a commentator on the first Equality Ball organized in Las Vegas on August 27, 2023.

In 2023, a recording of his voice appeared on Madonna's Celebration Tour during the song Vogue.

== Discography ==
=== 2021 ===
- The Vogue Toys
- The Throwbacks I'm Not a Homosexual

=== 2022 ===
- The Lost File's Part 1
- Let's Pump Da Beat
- Show Up and Show Out
- Can We Vogue
- The Hidden Files
- The Vogue Sessions on Thu Seven
- The Hardrive

=== 2023 ===
- cinquante dix neuf / dix neuf
- Live at Esco's Vogue Knights
- Keep On Serving Cunt
- Prepare to Vogue
- The Dramatic Collection

=== 2024 ===
- Be Here With Me
- In The Cunty Soft Collection
- The Cunty Minutes of Vogue Track by Track
- A Strong Woman (Powerful Message)
- Light Up The Dancefloor
