= List of songs recorded by Beyoncé =

Songs by American singer

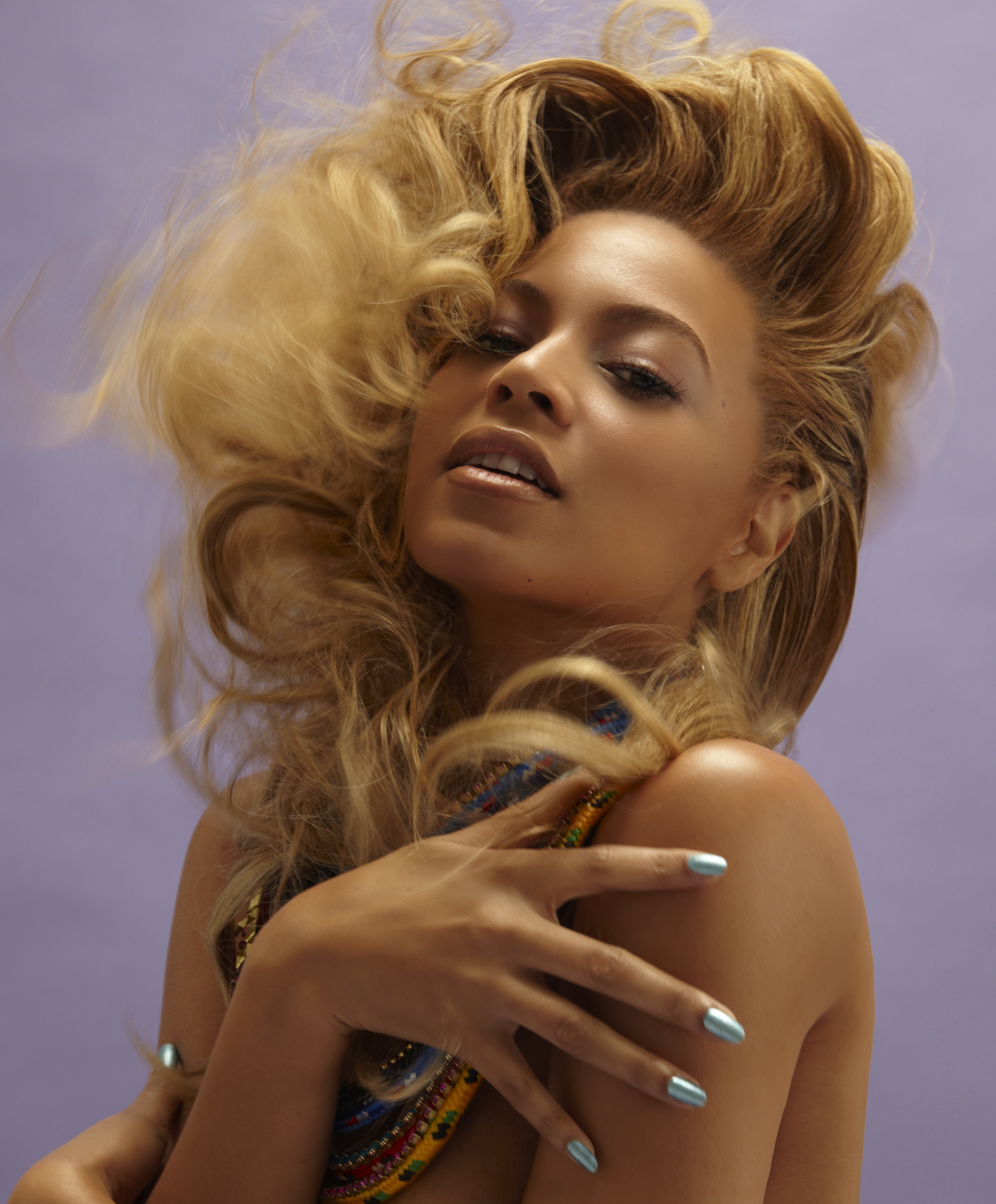
Beyoncé in 2011

American singer-songwriter Beyoncé rose to fame in the late 1990s as the lead singer of the R&B girl group Destiny's Child, one of the world's best-selling girl groups of all time. During the hiatus of the girl group in 2001, Beyoncé embarked on her solo career that she pursued following the disbandment of the group in 2006. She has written and recorded material for her eight studio albums, namely Dangerously in Love (2003), B'Day (2006), I Am... Sasha Fierce (2008), 4 (2011), her self-titled visual album, Beyoncé (2013), her second visual album Lemonade (2016), Renaissance (2022), and Cowboy Carter (2024). Apart from her work in music, Beyoncé has launched a career in acting. She made her debut in the 2001 musical film Carmen: A Hip Hopera, prior to appearing in major films, including Austin Powers in Goldmember (2002), The Pink Panther (2006), Dreamgirls (2006), Cadillac Records (2008), Epic (2013) and The Lion King (2019). She has written and recorded material for the soundtrack albums of all the mentioned movies. Beyoncé has also lent her vocals to several recordings for specific charitable causes and other tracks that were used in television advertisements. Songs included in this list are from her studio albums, extended plays, soundtrack albums, live albums, mixtapes, and collaborations with other recording artists on their respective albums. Many of them were released as singles and have been successful both stateside and in international markets. Also included in this list are songs that Beyoncé recorded, but remain unreleased or were never officially released.

Beyoncé started recording material for her debut solo album Dangerously in Love in 2002; she selected the producers with whom she would collaborate, held meetings with prospective producers from West Coast across the East Coast and had interviews with them. She went to Miami, Florida to begin sessions with record producer Scott Storch, her first collaborator. Beyoncé took a wider role in the production of Dangerously in Love, co-writing a majority of the songs, choosing which ones to produce and sharing ideas on the mixing and mastering of tracks. 15 of 43 songs recorded by Beyoncé, made it to the album. After having a month-long vacation following the filming Dreamgirls, she went to the studio to start working on her second studio album B'Day in 2006. Beyoncé began working with songwriter-producers Rich Harrison, Rodney Jerkins, Sean Garrett, Cameron Wallace, The Neptunes, Swizz Beatz, and Walter Millsap. Two female songwriters were also included in the production team, who helped structure the album: Beyoncé's cousin Angela Beyince, who had previously collaborated in Dangerously in Love, and songwriter Makeba Riddick, who made her way into the team after writing "Déjà Vu", the lead single off B'Day. While Beyoncé and the team brainstormed the lyrics, other collaborators simultaneously produce the tracks. She arranged, co-wrote and co-produced all the songs on B'Day, which was titled as a reference to her birthday, and completed in three weeks.

In 2007, Beyoncé began working on her third studio album I Am... Sasha Fierce, which she said was a double album while making comparisons to a magazine. The first disc I Am... was intended to show her insecurities about love, and to give a behind-the-scenes glimpse of Beyoncé's life, stripped of her make-up and celebrity trappings. On the other hand, the second disc Sasha Fierce showcased her aggressive, sensual and care-free onstage alter ego of the same name. When Beyoncé started recording tracks for I Am... Sasha Fierce, she felt that she had to grow and mature artistically; she wanted to "be challenged". Inspired by her husband Jay-Z and Etta James, she collaborated with several producers and songwriters – including Kenneth Edmonds, Stargate, Christopher "Tricky" Stewart, Terius "The-Dream" Nash, Rodney Jerkins, Sean Garrett, Solange, Jim Jonsin, Rico Love and Ryan Tedder – while either co-wroting or co-producing each song on the record. In 2010, Beyoncé took a break from her career to rest and gain perspective. During the hiatus, she dedicated herself to enjoying the everyday things in life, which reignited her creativity and became a source of inspiration for her fourth studio album 4 that she described as "a labor of love". Beyoncé also drew inspiration from the work of Fela Kuti, Earth, Wind & Fire, Lionel Richie, The Jackson 5, New Edition, Florence and the Machine, Adele, and Prince. She allowed herself the artistic freedom to record songs in which the melody and lyrics came together naturally. Wanting to bring back "the emotion and live instruments and just soul missing out of the music industry", Beyoncé co-produced the entire record as she worked with Diane Warren, Diplo, Ester Dean, Switch, Tricky Stewart, The-Dream, Frank Ocean, Kanye West, Sean Garrett and Shea Taylor, among others.

In 2022, Beyoncé released Renaissance, the first act of a planned trilogy, celebrating dance music and its connections to the Black and LGBTQ+ communities. The album received critical and commercial success, exploring house and disco influences. In March 2024, she released Cowboy Carter, the second act of the trilogy, which incorporates country music and highlights its Black roots. The album features collaborations with artists like Dolly Parton and Willie Nelson and has been praised for its innovative blending of genres.

== Released songs ==
Key
†	Indicates single release

Song	Artist(s)	Writer(s)	Originating album (Note: An asterisk beside an album title denotes the song to be available as a bonus track on certain editions of said album.)	Year	Ref.
"'03 Bonnie & Clyde" † (Note: "'03 Bonnie & Clyde" contains an interpolation of "If I Was Your Girlfriend" by Prince and a sample of "Me and My Girlfriend" by Tupac Shakur.)	Jay-Z featuring Beyoncé Knowles	Jay-Z; Darryl Harper; Kanye West; Prince; Rick Rouse; Tupac Shakur; Tyrone Wrice	The Blueprint 2: The Gift & The Curse*	2002	
"1+1" †	Beyoncé	Beyoncé; Tricky Stewart; The-Dream	4	2011	
"16 Carriages" †	Beyoncé	Beyoncé; Dave Hamelin; Atia Boggs; Raphael Saadiq	Cowboy Carter	2024	
"6 Inch"	Beyoncé featuring The Weeknd	Beyoncé; The Weeknd; Danny Boy Styles; Ben Billions; The-Dream; Ahmad Balshe; Boots; Avey Tare; Panda Bear; Geologist; Burt Bacharach; Hal David	Lemonade	2016	
"7/11" †	Beyoncé	Beyoncé; Detail; Bobby Johnson	Beyoncé: Platinum Edition	2014	
"After All Is Said and Done"	Beyoncé and Marc Nelson	Gordon Chambers; Philip Edward Galdston	The Best Man	1999	
"Already"	Beyoncé, Shatta Wale and Major Lazer	Beyoncé; Brittany Hazzard; Toumani Diabaté; Clément Picard; Maxime Picard; Thomas Pentz; Charles Mensah; Ronald Banful	The Lion King: The Gift	2019	
"Alien Superstar"	Beyoncé	Beyoncé; Honey Redmond; Christopher Penny; Luke Solomon; Denisia Andrews; Brittany Coney; Shawn Carter; David Brown; Dave Hamelin; Timothy McKenzie; Danielle Balbuena; Rami Yacoub; Leven Kali; Atia Boggs; Levar Coppin; Saliou Diagne; Michael Dean; Rob Manzoli; Richard Fairbrass; Christopher Fairbrass; John Holiday; Barbara Ann Teer; Kim Cooper; Peter Rauhofer	Renaissance	2022	
"All I Could Do Was Cry"	Beyoncé	Berry Gordy; Gwen Gordy Fuqua; Billy Davis	Cadillac Records	2008	
"Alliigator Tears"	Beyoncé	Beyoncé; Terius Adamu Ya Gesteelde-Diamant; Khirye Tyler; Jack Siegel	Cowboy Carter	2024	
"All Night"	Beyoncé	Beyoncé; Diplo; Rock City; Ilsey Juber; Akil King; Aman Tekleab; Jaramye Daniels; OutKast; Sleepy Brown; Ricky Anthony	Lemonade	2016	
"All That I'm Lookin' For" (also released as "Sex Kitten" †)	Kitten K. Sera, Beyoncé and Kelly Rowland	Kitten K. Sera; Kelly Kidd; Wolfram De Marco	The Katrina CD	2005	
"Sex Kitten" † (alternate title for "All That I'm Lookin' For")	Kitten K. Sera and Beyoncé	Kitten K. Sera; Kelly Kidd; Wolfram De Marco	—N/a	2013	
"All Up In Your Mind"	Beyoncé	Beyoncé; Jabbar Stevens; Cherdericka Nichols; Michael Tucker; Alexander Cook; Michael Dean; Larry Griffin Jr. Jameil Aossey	Renaissance	2022	
"Amen"	Beyoncé	Beyoncé; Dave Hamelin; Danielle Balbuena; Camaron Ochs; Tyler Johnson; Ian Fitchuk; Darius Scott; Derek Dixie; Ricky Lawson	Cowboy Carter	2024	
"America Has a Problem" †	Beyoncé	Beyoncé; Terius Nash; Shawn Carter; Michael Dean; Andrell Rogers; Tino McIntosh; Kendrick Lamar	Renaissance	2022	
"Ameriican Requiem"	Beyoncé	Beyoncé; Camaron Ochs; Atia Boggs; Darius Scott; Tyler Johnson; Dan Walsh; Darius Dixson; Derek Dixie; Ernest Dion Wilson; Jon Batiste; Michael Price; Raphael Saadiq; Shawn Carter; Stephen Stills	Cowboy Carter	2024	
"Amor Gitano" †	Alejandro Fernández featuring Beyoncé	Beyoncé; Jaime Flores; Reyli	Viento a favor	2007	
"At Last" † (Note: "At Last" is a 1941 song written by Mack Gordon and Harry Warren for the musical film Orchestra Wives (1942).)	Beyoncé	Harry Warren; Mack Gordon	Cadillac Records	2008	
"Ave María"	Beyoncé	Beyoncé; Amanda Ghost; Ian Dench; Makeba Riddick; Stargate	I Am... Sasha Fierce	2008	
"A Woman Like Me" (Note: "A Woman Like Me" was originally recorded for the soundtrack album of The Pink Panther (2006), but was eventually not used.)	Beyoncé	Beyoncé; Charmelle Cofield; Ron Lawrence	—N/a	2006	
"Baby Boy" †	Beyoncé featuring Sean Paul	Beyoncé; Robert Waller; Scott Storch; Sean Paul; Jay-Z	Dangerously in Love	2003	
"Back to Black"	Beyoncé and André 3000	Amy Winehouse; Mark Ronson	The Great Gatsby	2013	
"Back Up"	Beyoncé	Beyoncé; Rodney Jerkins; LaShawn Daniels; Delisha Thomas; Fred Jerkins III; Anesha Birchett; Antea Birchett; Angela Beyincé	B'Day*	2006	
"Be Alive" †	Beyoncé	Beyoncé; Darius "DIXSON" Scott	King Richard	2021	
"Be with You" (Note: "Be with You" contains interpolations from "I'd Rather Be with You" by Bootsy's Rubber Band and excerpts from "Strawberry Letter 23" by The Brothers Johnson.)	Beyoncé	Angela Beyincé; Beyoncé; Bootsy Collins; Gary Cooper; George Clinton Jr. Rich Harrison; Shuggie Otis; Jay-Z; Eugene Record	Dangerously in Love	2003	
"Beautiful Liar" †	Beyoncé and Shakira	Amanda Ghost; Beyoncé; Ian Dench; Stargate	B'Day	2007	
"Before I Let Go"	Beyoncé	Frankie Beverly; Larry Blackmon; Tomi Jenkins; Beyoncé; Jerome Temple	Homecoming: The Live Album	2019	
"Bello Embustero" (Note: "Bello Embustero" is the Spanish-language re-recording of "Beautiful Liar" (B'Day (Deluxe Edition), 2007).)	Beyoncé	Amanda Ghost; Beyoncé; Ian Dench; Rudy Pérez; Stargate	Irreemplazable (Note: Irreemplazable is the first extended play (EP) by Beyoncé. Featuring Spanish, English and Spanglish re-recordings of songs from her second studio album B'Day (2006), it was marketed as a bonus disc for the deluxe edition of B'Day, before being released separately on August 28, 2007 by Columbia Records.)	2007	
"Best Thing I Never Had" †	Beyoncé	Antonio Dixon; Beyoncé; Caleb McCampbell; Babyface; Symbolic One; Patrick "J. Que" Smith; Shea Taylor	4	2011	
"Beyoncé Interlude"	Beyoncé	Beyoncé	Dangerously in Love	2003	
"Bienvenue"	IAM featuring Beyoncé	Akhenaton; Shurik'n; Deni Hines	Dangerously in Love*	2003	
"Bigger"	Beyoncé	Beyoncé; Derek Dixie; Stacy Barthe; Rachel Keen; Akil King; Ricky Lawson	The Lion King: The Gift	2019	
"Blackbiird"	Beyoncé; Brittney Spencer; Reyna Roberts; Tanner Adell; Tiera Kennedy	Beyoncé; John Winston Ono Lennon; Sir James Paul McCartney	Cowboy Carter	2024	
"Black Parade" †	Beyoncé	Beyoncé; Derek James Dixie; Akil King; Brittany Coney; Denisia Andrews; Kim Krysiuk; Rickie Tice; Shawn Carter	The Lion King: The Gift	2020	
"Blow"	Beyoncé	Beyoncé; Pharrell Williams; James Fauntleroy; Timbaland; J-Roc; Justin Timberlake	Beyoncé	2013	
"Blue"	Beyoncé featuring Blue Ivy	Beyoncé; Boots	Beyoncé	2013	
"Bow Down / I Been On"	Beyoncé	Beyoncé; Hit-Boy	—N/a	2013	
"Bodyguard"	Beyoncé	Beyoncé Elizabeth Lowell Boland; Leven Kali; Raphael Saadiq; Ryan Beatty; Shawntoni Ajanae Nichols	Cowboy Carter	2024	
"Break My Soul" †	Beyoncé	Beyoncé; Terius Nash; Christopher Stewart; Shawn Carter; Allen George; Fred McFarlane; Adam Pigott; Freddie Ross; Jens Isaksen	Renaissance	2022	
"Broken-Hearted Girl" †	Beyoncé	Beyoncé; Babyface; Stargate	I Am... Sasha Fierce	2008	
"Brown Eyes" (Note: Though featured on Destiny's Child's album Survivor (2001), "Brown Eyes" was performed by Beyoncé only.)	Beyoncé	Beyoncé; Walter Afanasieff	Survivor	2001	
"Brown Skin Girl" †	Beyoncé with Saint Jhn and Wizkid featuring Blue Ivy Carter	Beyoncé; Carlos St. John; Adio Marchant; Shawn Carter; Stacy Barthe; Anathi Mnyango; Michael Uzowuru; Richard Isong	The Lion King: The Gift	2019	
"Cadillac Car"	Beyoncé, Anne Warren, Anika Noni Rose, Eddie Murphy, Jennifer Hudson, Laura Bell Bundy, Rory O'Malley	Henry Krieger; Tom Eyen	Dreamgirls	2006	
"Can I"	Drake featuring Beyoncé	Aubrey Graham; Noah Shebib; Beyoncé; Johnny Marr	Care Package	2019	
"Can I Watch You"	Beyoncé & Pharrell Williams	Beyoncé; Pharrell Williams	B'Day (20th Anniversary Edition)	2026	
"Cards Never Lie" (Note: "Cards Never Lie" is titled as "Death Song" in film credits.)	Beyoncé, Rah Digga and Wyclef Jean	Kip Collins; Sekani Williams	Carmen: A Hip Hopera	2001	
"Carmen in Squad Car" (Note: "Carmen in Squad Car" was originally recorded for the soundtrack album of Carmen: A Hip Hopera (2001), but was only used in the film.)	Mekhi Phifer & Beyoncé	Kip Collins; Kisha Robinson	Carmen: A Hip Hopera (Film only)	2001	
"Check on It" †	Beyoncé featuring Slim Thug	Angela Beyince; Beyoncé; Swizz Beatz; Sean Garrett; Slim Thug	#1's	2005	
"Church Girl"	Beyoncé	Beyoncé; Terius Nash; Ernest Wilson; Elbernita Clark; Jimi Payton; Dion Norman; Derrick Ordogne; James Brown; Orville Hall; Phillip Price; Ralph MacDonald; William Salter	Renaissance	2022	
"The Closer I Get to You" (Note: "The Closer I Get to You", originally performed by Roberta Flack and Donny Hathaway in 1978, was re-recorded by Beyoncé as a duet with Luther Vandross for her album Dangerously in Love (2003).)	Beyoncé and Luther Vandross	James Mtume; Reggie Lucas	Dangerously in Love	2003	
"Countdown" † (Note: "Countdown" samples "Uhh Ahh" by Boyz II Men.)	Beyoncé	Beyoncé; Cainon Lamb; Ester Dean; Julie Frost; Michael Bivins; Nathan Morris; Shea Taylor; The-Dream; Wanya Morris	4	2011	
"Cozy"	Beyoncé	Beyoncé; Honey Redmond; Christopher Penny; Luke Solomon; Dave Giles II; Nija Charles; Terius Nash; Michael Dean; Corece Smith; Curtis Jones; Kim Cooper; Peter Rauhofer; Ts Madison	Renaissance	2022	
"Crazy Feelings"	Missy Elliott featuring Beyoncé	Missy Elliott; Timbaland	Da Real World	1999	
"Crazy in Love" † (Note: "Crazy in Love" contains samples from "Are You My Woman (Tell Me So)" by The Chi-Lites.)	Beyoncé featuring Jay-Z	Beyoncé; Eugene Record; Rich Harrison; Jay-Z	Dangerously in Love	2003	
"Creole"	Beyoncé	Beyoncé; Makeba Riddick; Rich Harrison	B'Day*	2006	
"Cuerpo (Tumbao)"	Beyoncé featuring Maluma	Beyoncé; Édgar Barrera; Juan Luis Londoño Arias; Terius Nash; Andrés Correa Rios; Luis Miguel Gomez Castaño; Solange Knowles; Angela Beyincé; Kasseem Dean; Makeba Riddick; Sean Garrett; Sergio George; Fernando Osorio	B'Day (20th Anniversary Edition)	2026	
"Cuff It" †	Beyoncé	Beyoncé; Denisia Andrews; Brittany Coney; Morten Ristorp; Raphael Saadiq; Terius Nash; Mary Brockert; Allen McGrier; Nile Rodgers	Renaissance	2022	
"Daddy" †	Beyoncé	Beyoncé; Mark Batson	Dangerously in Love	2003	
"Daddy"	Beyoncé	Beyoncé; Mark Batson	Daddy's Little Girls	2007	
"Daddy Lessons"	Beyoncé	Beyoncé; Kevin Cossom; Wynter Gordon; Alex Delicata	Lemonade	2016	
"Dance for You"	Beyoncé	Beyoncé; Tricky Stewart; The-Dream	4	2011	
"Dangerously in Love 2"	Beyoncé	Beyoncé; Errol McCalla Jr.	Dangerously in Love	2003	
"Daughter"	Beyoncé	Beyoncé; Camaron Ochs; Simon Mårtensson; Terius Adamu Ya Gesteelde-Diamant; Shawn Carter; Derek Dixie	Cowboy Carter	2024	
"Déjà Vu" †	Beyoncé featuring Jay-Z	Beyoncé; Delisha Thomas; Keli Nicole Price; Makeba Riddick; Rodney Jerkins; Jay-Z	B'Day	2006	
"Delresto (Echoes)" †	Beyoncé and Travis Scott	Beyoncé; Jacques Webster II; Justin Vernon; James Blake Litherland; Chauncey Hollis Jr. Michael Dean; Allen Ritter	Utopia	2023	
"Desert Eagle"	Beyoncé	Beyoncé; Jabbar Stevens; Miranda Johnson; Marcus Reddick	Cowboy Carter	2024	
"Diamonds Are a Girl's Best Friend" (Note: Beyoncé covered Carol Channing's 1949 song "Diamonds Are a Girl's Best Friend" for Giorgio Armani's new fragrance Emporio Armani Diamonds in an ad directed by Jake Nava and titled "Can You Resist?".)	Beyoncé	Jule Styne; Leo Robin	—N/a	2007	
"Die with You"	Beyoncé	Beyoncé; Kirby Lauryen Dockery	—N/a	2015	
"Disappear"	Beyoncé	Beyoncé; Amanda Ghost; Dave McCracken; Hugo; Ian Dench	I Am... Sasha Fierce	2008	
"Diva" †	Beyoncé	Beyoncé; Shondrae Crawford; Sean Garrett	I Am... Sasha Fierce	2008	
"Morning Dew (Donk)"	Beyoncé	Beyoncé; Terius Nash; Pharrell Williams; Darius Dixson; Angela Sherrie Woods	B'Day (20th Anniversary Edition)	2026	
"Don't Hurt Yourself"	Beyoncé featuring Jack White	Jack White; Beyoncé; Wynter Gordon; Led Zeppelin	Lemonade	2016	
"Dreamgirls"	Beyoncé, Anika Noni Rose, Jennifer Hudson	Henry Krieger; Tom Eyen	Dreamgirls	2006	
"Dreamgirls (Finale)"	Beyoncé, Anika Noni Rose, Jennifer Hudson, Sharon Leal	Henry Krieger; Tom Eyen	Dreamgirls	2006	
"Dreaming"	Beyoncé	Antonio Dixon; Beyoncé; Babyface; Patrick "J. Que" Smith	4*	2011	
"Dreams"	Boots featuring Beyoncé	Boots	Winter Spring Summer Fall	2014	
"Drunk in Love" †	Beyoncé featuring Jay-Z	Beyoncé; Detail; Jay-Z; Andre Eric Proctor; Rasool Díaz; Brian Soko; Timbaland; J-Roc	Beyoncé	2013	
"Ego" †	Beyoncé	Beyoncé; Blac Elvis; Harold Lilly	I Am... Sasha Fierce	2008	
"End of Time" †	Beyoncé	Beyoncé; Terius Nash; Shea Taylor; David Taylor	4	2011	
"Energy"	Beyoncé and BEAM	Beyoncé; Tyshane Thompson; Sonny Moore; Almando Cresso; Jordan Douglas; Tizita Makuria; Denisia Andrews; Brittany Coney; Terius Nash; Mary Brockert; Allen McGrier; Pharrell Williams; Chad Hugo; Adam Pigott; Freddie Ross	Renaissance	2022	
"Fake Your Way to the Top"	Beyoncé, Anika Noni Rose, Eddie Murphy and Jennifer Hudson	Henry Krieger; Tom Eyen	Dreamgirls	2006	
"Family"	Beyoncé, Anika Noni Rose, Jamie Foxx, Jennifer Hudson and Keith Robinson	Henry Krieger; Tom Eyen	Dreamgirls	2006	
"Family (End Title)"	Beyoncé, Anika Noni Rose, Jamie Foxx, Jennifer Hudson and Keith Robinson	Henry Krieger; Tom Eyen	Dreamgirls	2006	
"Family Feud" † (Note: "Family Feud" contains portions of "Ha Ya (Eternal Life)", written by Elbernita Clark, and performed by The Clark Sisters.)	Jay-Z featuring Beyoncé	Jay-Z; Dion Wilson; Beyoncé; Elbernita Clark	4:44	2017	
"Feeling Myself"	Nicki Minaj featuring Beyoncé	Beyoncé; Nicki Minaj; SZA; Hit-Boy	The Pinkprint	2014	
"Fever" (Note: "Fever" is 1956 a song originally performed by Little Willie John.)	Beyoncé	Eddie Cooley; John Davenport	The Fighting Temptations	2003	
"Fever" †	Beyoncé	Eddie Cooley; John Davenport	Heat	2011	
"Fighting Temptation" †	Beyoncé, Missy Elliott, MC Lyte and Free	Gene Pistilli; Jonathan Burks; Karriem Mack; Lana Moorer; LaShaun Owens; Marie Wright; Missy Elliott; Walter Murphy	The Fighting Temptations	2002	
"Find Your Way Back"	Beyoncé	Beyoncé; Brittany Hazzard; Bubele Booi; Robert Magwenzi; Abisagboola Oluseun; Niniola Apata; Osabuohien Osaretin	The Lion King: The Gift	2019	
"Flamenco"	Beyoncé	Beyoncé; Shawntoni Nichols	Cowboy Carter	2024	
"***Flawless" †	Beyoncé featuring Chimamanda Ngozi Adichie	Beyoncé; Chimamanda Ngozi Adichie; Boots; The-Dream; Hit-Boy; Rey Reel	Beyoncé	2013	
"Flawless (Remix)" †	Beyoncé featuring Nicki Minaj	Beyoncé; Nicki Minaj; The-Dream; Hit-Boy; OutKast; Sleepy Brown; HazeBanga; Rey Reel Music	Beyoncé: Platinum Edition	2014	
"Flaws and All"	Beyoncé	Beyoncé; Ne-Yo; Shea Taylor; Solange Knowles	B'Day	2006	
"Flaws and All"	Beyoncé	Beyoncé; Ne-Yo; Shea Taylor; Solange Knowles	Why Did I Get Married?	2007	
"Formation" †	Beyoncé	Khalif Brown; Asheton Hogan; Beyoncé; Mike Will Made It	Lemonade	2016	
"Forward"	Beyoncé featuring James Blake	Beyoncé; James Blake	Lemonade	2016	
"Freakum Dress"	Beyoncé	Beyoncé; Makeba Riddick; Rich Harrison	B'Day	2006	
"Freedom"	Beyoncé featuring Kendrick Lamar	Beyoncé; Jonny Coffer; Carla Marie Williams; Dean McIntosh; Kendrick Lamar; Frank Tirado; Alan Lomax; John Lomax, Sr.	Lemonade	2016	
"Get Me Bodied" †	Beyoncé	Angela Beyince; Beyoncé; Swizz Beatz; Makeba Riddick; Sean Garrett; Solange Knowles	B'Day	2006	
"Gift from Virgo" (Note: "Gift from Virgo" is inspired by "Rainy Day" by Shuggie Otis.)	Beyoncé	Beyoncé; Shuggie Otis	Dangerously in Love	2003	
"Girls' Cali Dreams" (Note: "Girls' Cali Dream" was originally recorded for the soundtrack album of Carmen: A Hip Hopera (2001), but was only used in the film.)	Beyoncé, Rah Digga and Joy Bryant	Kip Collins; Sekani Williams	Carmen: A Hip Hopera (Film only)	2001	
"God Bless the USA" † (Note: "God Bless the USA" is a 1984 song originally performed by Lee Greenwood.)	Beyoncé	Lee Greenwood	Charity record	2008	
"God Made You Beautiful"	Beyoncé	Beyoncé; Chris Braide; Sia	Life Is But a Dream / Live in Atlantic City	2013	
"Green Light" †	Beyoncé	Beyoncé; Pharrell Williams; Sean Garrett	B'Day	2006	
"Grown Woman" (Note: "Grown Woman" was only initially released in music video form on Beyoncé (2013), not as an actual audio track. It was officially released on December 13, 2023 to celebrate the tenth anniversary of the album.)	Beyoncé	Beyoncé; Timbaland; Kelly Sheehan; The-Dream; Chris Godbey; J-Roc; Darryl Pearson; Garland Mosley	Beyoncé*	2013	
"Grown Woman" †	Beyoncé	Beyoncé; Timbaland; Kelly Sheehan; The-Dream; Chris Godbey; J-Roc; Darryl Pearson; Garland Mosley	—N/a	2023	
"Halo" †	Beyoncé	Beyoncé; E. Kidd Bogart; Ryan Tedder	I Am... Sasha Fierce	2008	
"Halo"	Beyoncé featuring Chris Martin of Coldplay	Beyoncé; E. Kidd Bogart; Ryan Tedder	Hope for Haiti Now: A Global Benefit for Earthquake Relief	2010	
"Hard to Say Goodbye"	Beyoncé, Anika Noni Rose and Sharon Leal	Henry Krieger; Tom Eyen	Dreamgirls	2006	
"Haunted"	Beyoncé	Beyoncé; Boots	Beyoncé	2013	
"Have Your Way"	Beyoncé and Kelly Rowland	Beyoncé; Fred Jerkins III; LaShawn Daniels	His Woman His Wife	2000	
"Heated"	Beyoncé	Beyoncé; Aubrey Graham; Sean Seaton; Rupert Thomas Jr. Jahaan Sweet; Matthew Samuels; Denisia Andrews; Brittany Coney; Ricky Lawson; Oliver Rodigan; George Clinton Jr. Travis Garland	Renaissance	2022	
"Heavy"	Beyoncé, Anika Noni Rose and Jennifer Hudson	Henry Krieger; Tom Eyen	Dreamgirls	2006	
"He Still Loves Me"	Beyoncé and Walter Williams Sr.	James "Big Jim" Wright; Jimmy Jam and Terry Lewis	The Fighting Temptations	2003	
"Heaven"	Beyoncé	Beyoncé; Boots	Beyoncé	2013	
"Hello"	Beyoncé	Beyoncé; David Quiñones; E. Kidd Bogart; Ramon Owen	I Am... Sasha Fierce	2008	
"Hey Goldmember"	Beyoncé, Devin and Solange	Al McKay; Harry Wayne Casey; Maurice White; Mike Myers; Paul Myers; Richard Finch	Austin Powers in: Goldmermber	2002	
"Hip Hop Star"	Beyoncé featuring Big Boi and Sleepy Brown	Big Boi; Beyoncé; Bryce Wilson; Makeda Davis; Jay-Z	Dangerously in Love	2003	
"Hill Says "No" to Cali" (Note: "Hill Says "No" to Cali" was originally recorded for the soundtrack album of Carmen: A Hip Hopera (2001), but was only used in the film.)	Mekhi Phifer and Beyoncé	Kip Collins; Sekani Williams	Carmen: A Hip Hopera (Film only)	2001	
"Hold Up" †	Beyoncé	Diplo; Ezra Koenig; Beyoncé; Emile Haynie; J. Tillman; MNEK; MeLo-X; Doc Pomus; Mort Shuman; Soulja Boy; Antonio Randolph; Kelvin McConnell; Yeah Yeah Yeahs	Lemonade	2016	
"Hollywood" †	Jay-Z featuring Beyoncé	Syience; Ne-Yo; Jay-Z	Kingdom Come	2006	
"Honesty"	Beyoncé	Billy Joel	I Am... Sasha Fierce*	2008	
"Hymn for the Weekend" †	Coldplay featuring Beyoncé (uncredited)	Coldplay	A Head Full of Dreams	2015	
"I Can't Take No More"	Beyoncé	Beyoncé; Mario Winans; Michael Jones	Dangerously in Love	2003	
"I Care"	Beyoncé	Beyoncé; Jeff Bhasker; Chad Hugo	4	2011	
"I Got That" †	Amil featuring Beyoncé	Amil; Jean Claude Olivier; LeShan Lewis; Makeda Davis; Samuel Barnes; Jay-Z; Tamy Smith	All Money Is Legal	2000	
"I Miss You"	Beyoncé	Beyoncé; Frank Ocean; Shea Taylor	4	2011	
"I Want You Baby"	Beyoncé, Anika Noni Rose, Eddie Murphy and Jennifer Hudson	Henry Krieger; Tom Eyen	Dreamgirls	2006	
"I Was Here"	Beyoncé	Diane Warren	4	2011	
"I'd Rather Go Blind" (Note: "I'd Rather Go Blind" is a 1968 song originally performed by Etta James.)	Beyoncé	Billy Foster; Ellington Jordan; Etta James	Cadillac Records	2008	
"If"	Beyoncé	Beyoncé; Stargate; Ne-Yo	B'Day	2007	
"If I Were a Boy" †	Beyoncé	BC Jean; Toby Gad	I Am... Sasha Fierce	2008	
"If Looks Could Kill (You Would Be Dead)" (Note: "If Looks Could Kill (You Would Be Dead)" is titled as "Carmen in Lou's Pub" in film credits.)	Beyoncé, Mos Def and Sam Sarpong	Kip Collins; Sekani Williams	Carmen: A Hip Hopera	2001	
"II Hands II Heaven"	Beyoncé	Beyoncé; Dave Hamelin; Ryan Beatty; Jack Rochon; Terius Gesteelde-Diamant; Mark Spears	Cowboy Carter	2024	
"II Most Wanted"	Beyoncé; Miley Cyrus	Beyoncé; Miley Cyrus; Michael Pollack; Ryan Tedder	Cowboy Carter	2024	
"I'm Somebody"	Beyoncé, Anika Noni Rose and Sharon Leal	Henry Krieger; Tom Eyen	Dreamgirls	2006	
"I'm That Girl"	Beyoncé	Beyoncé; Terius Nash; Kelman Duran; Michael Dean; Tommy Wright III; Andrea Summers	Renaissance	2022	
"Irreplaceable" †	Beyoncé	Espionage; Beyoncé; Stargate; Ne-Yo	B'Day	2006	
"Irreemplazable" (Note: "Irreemplazable" is the Spanish-language re-recording of "Irreplaceable" (B'Day (Deluxe Edition), 2007).)	Beyoncé	Beyoncé; Espionage; Ne-Yo; Rudy Pérez; Stargate	Irreemplazable	2007	
"Irreemplazable (Como la Flor)"	Beyoncé featuring Selena	Beyoncé; Espionage; Ne-Yo; Rudy Pérez; Stargate; A.B. Quintanilla III; Pete Astudillo	B'Day (20th Anniversary Edition)	2026	
"It's All Over"	Beyoncé, Anika Noni Rose, Jamie Foxx, Jennifer Hudson, Keith Robinson, Sharon Leal	Henry Krieger; Tom Eyen	Dreamgirls	2006	
"Jealous"	Beyoncé	Beyoncé; Detail; Lyrica Anderson; Andre Eric Proctor; Rasool Díaz; Brian Soko; Boots	Beyoncé	2013	
"Jolene"	Beyoncé	Dolly Parton	Cowboy Carter	2024	
"Just for Fun"	Beyoncé; Willie Jones	Beyoncé; Ryan Beatty; Dave Hamelin; Jeff Gitelman	Cowboy Carter	2024	
"Just Stand Up!" † (Note: "Just Stand Up!" is a 2008 song performed by an all-star charity supergroup artists during the telethon "Stand Up to Cancer".)	Beyoncé among Artists Stand Up to Cancer	Babyface; L.A. Reid	—N/a	2008	
"Keep Giving Your Love to Me"	Beyoncé	Adonis Shropshire; Ryan Leslie; Beyoncé; Mario Mendell Winans; Younglord	Bad Boys II	2003	
"Kitty Kat"	Beyoncé	Beyoncé; Pharrell Williams; Jay-Z	B'Day	2006	
"The Last Great Seduction" (Note: "The Last Great Seduction" is titled as "Carmen Seduces Hill" in film credits.)	Beyoncé and Mekhi Phifer	Kip Collins; Sekani Williams	Carmen: A Hip Hopera	2001	
"Lay Up Under Me"	Beyoncé	Beyoncé; Stargate; Sean Garrett; Shea Taylor	4	2011	
"Levii's Jeans"	Beyoncé; Post Malone	Beyoncé; Austin Post; Terius Adamu Ya Gesteelde-Diamant; Nile Rodgers; Shawn Carter	Cowboy Carter	2024	
"Lift Off" †	Jay-Z and Kanye West featuring Beyoncé	Jay-Z; Kanye West; Bruno Mars; Jeff Bhasker; Pharrell Williams; Seal	Watch the Throne	2011	
"Listen" †	Beyoncé	Anne Preven; Beyoncé; Henry Krieger; Scott Cutler	Dreamgirls	2006	
"Lorell Loves Jimmy / Family (Reprise)"	Beyoncé, Anika Noni Rose and Sharon Leal	Henry Krieger; Tom Eyen	Dreamgirls	2006	
"Lost Yo Mind"	Beyoncé	Beyoncé; Swizz Beatz; Sean Garrett	B'Day*	2006	
"Love a Woman"	Mary J. Blige featuring Beyoncé	Beyoncé; Mary J. Blige; Menardini Timothee; Sean Garrett	My Life II... The Journey Continues (Act 1)	2011	
"Love Drought"	Beyoncé	Beyoncé; Mike Dean; Ingrid Burley	Lemonade	2016	
"Love in This Club, Part II" †	Usher featuring Beyoncé and Lil Wayne	Thom Bell; Lil Wayne; Linda Creed; Darnell Dalton; Keri Hilson; Young Jeezy; Polow da Don; Ryon Lovett; Usher; Keith Thomas; Lamar Taylor	Here I Stand	2008	
"Love Love Me Baby"	Beyoncé, Anika Noni Rose and Sharon Leal	Henry Krieger; Tom Eyen	Dreamgirls	2006	
"Love on Top" †	Beyoncé	Beyoncé; Shea Taylor; The-Dream	4	2011	
"Make Me Say It Again, Girl" †	Ronald Isley & The Isley Brothers featuring Beyoncé	Chris Jasper; Ernest Isley; Marvin Isley; O'Kelly Isley; Ronald Isley; Rudolph Isley	Make Me Say It Again, Girl	2022	
"Me, Myself and I" †	Beyoncé	Beyoncé; Robert Waller; Scott Storch	Dangerously in Love	2003	
"Mine"	Beyoncé featuring Drake	Beyoncé; Noah Shebib; Drake; Majid Jordan; Omen	Beyoncé	2013	
"Mood 4 Eva" (Note: "Mood 4 Eva" contains elements of "Diaraby Nene" written and performed by Oumou Sangaré; contains an interpolation of "Sweet Green Fields" written by Jimmy Seals; contains an interpolation of "(Think) About It" written by James Brown.)	Beyoncé, Jay-Z and Childish Gambino featuring Oumou Sangaré	Beyoncé; Denisia Andrews; Brittany Coney; Donald Glover; Khaled Khaled; Floyd Hills; Shawn Carter; Anathi Mnyango; Ant Clemons; Michael Uzowuru; Teo Halm; Jeff Kleinman; Jimmy Seals; James Brown	The Lion King: The Gift	2019	
"Moon River" (Note: Beyoncé covered Henry Mancini's 1961 song "Moon River" in a short film for Tiffany & Co.'s "About Love" advertising campaign starring her and Jay-Z.)	Beyoncé	Johnny Mercer	Breakfast at Tiffany's: Music from the Motion Picture	2021	
"Move"	Beyoncé, Anika Noni Rose and Jennifer Hudson	Henry Krieger; Tom Eyen	Dreamgirls	2006	
"Move"	Beyoncé, Grace Jones and Tems	Beyoncé; Richard Isong; Ariowa Irosogie; Denisia Andrews; Brittany Coney; Temilade Openiyi; Ronald Banful	Renaissance	2022	
"Move Your Body" (Note: "Move Your Body!" is a 2011 re-written version of the 2006 song "Get Me Bodied" for the Let's Move! Flash Workout, which aims to combat child obesity by prompting youngsters to become more active.)	Beyoncé	Angela Beyince; Beyoncé; Kasseem Dean; Makeba Riddick; Sean Garrett; Solange Knowles	—N/a	2011	
"Mueve el Cuerpo" (Note: "Mueve el Cuerpo" is Spanish-language re-recording of "Get Me Bodied" (B'Day, 2006).)	Beyoncé	Angela Beyince; Beyoncé; Kasseem Dean; Makeba Riddick; Sean Garrett; Solange Knowles	—N/a	2011	
"My First Time"	Beyoncé	Beyoncé; Pharrell Williams	B'Day (20th Anniversary Deluxe Edition	2006	
"My House" †	Beyoncé	Beyoncé; Terius Adamu Ya Gesteelde-Diamant	Renaissance: A Film by Beyoncé	2023	
"My Man"	Beyoncé	Angela Beyince; Beyoncé; Robert Waller; Scott Storch	Destiny Fulfilled	2004	
"My Power"	Beyoncé, Nija, Busiswa, Yemi Alade, Tierra Whack, Moonchild Sanelly and DJ Lag	Beyoncé; Busiswa Gqulu; Yemi Alade; Sanelisiwe Twisha; Nija Charles; Denisia Andrews; Brittany Coney; Lwazi Gwala	The Lion King: The Gift	2019	
"My Rose"	Beyoncé	Beyoncé; Shawntoni Ajanae Nichols	Cowboy Carter	2024	
"Naïve"	Solange Knowles featuring Beyoncé and Da Brat	Beyoncé; HR Crump; Mathew Knowles; Da Brat	Solo Star	2003	
"Naughty Girl" † (Note: "Naughty Girl" contains interpolations from "Love to Love You Baby" by Donna Summer.)	Beyoncé	Angela Beyince; Beyoncé; Donna Summer; Giorgio Moroder; Pete Bellotte; Robert Waller; Scott Storch	Dangerously in Love	2003	
"Nile"	Beyoncé and Kendrick Lamar	Beyoncé; Kendrick Duckworth; Mark Spears; Hykeem Carter Jr. Keanu Torres; Denisia Andrews; Brittany Coney	The Lion King: The Gift	2019	
"No Angel" (Note: "No Angel" is officially stylized as "~~Angel~~".)	Beyoncé	Beyoncé; Caroline Polachek; James Fauntleroy	Beyoncé	2013	
"Nothing out There for Me"	Missy Elliott featuring Beyoncé	Craig Brockman; Missy Elliott; Nisan Stewart	Under Construction	2002	
"Oh Louisiana"	Beyoncé; Willie Nelson	Chuck Berry	Cowboy Carter	2024	
"On the Run"	Beyoncé	J-Roc; James Fauntleroy; Jay-Z; Timbaland	—N/a	2013	
"Once in a Lifetime"	Beyoncé	Beyoncé; Amanda Ghost; Ian Dench; James Vernon Dring; Jody Street; Scott McFarnon	Cadillac Records	2008	
"One Night Only (Disco)"	Beyoncé, Anika Noni Rose, Jennifer Hudson and Sharon Leal	Henry Krieger; Tom Eyen	Dreamgirls	2006	
"Otherside"	Beyoncé	Beyoncé; Sydney Bennett; Dave Rosser; Nick Green; Abisagboola Oluseun	The Lion King: The Gift	2019	
"Oye" (Note: "Oye" is Spanish-language re-recording of "Listen" (B'Day (Deluxe Edition), 2007).)	Beyoncé	Anne Preven; Beyoncé; Henry Krieger; Rudy Pérez; Scott Cutler	Irreemplazable	2007	
"Part II (On the Run)"	Jay-Z featuring Beyoncé	Jay-Z; James Fauntleroy; J-Roc; Timbaland	Magna Carta Holy Grail	2013	
"Partition"	Beyoncé	Beyoncé; The-Dream; Justin Timberlake; Timbaland; J-Roc; Key Wane	Beyoncé	2013	
"Party" (Note: "Party" samples "La Di Da Di" by Doug E. Fresh and the Get Fresh Crew featuring MC Ricky D.)	Beyoncé featuring André 3000	André 3000; Beyoncé; Consequence; Doug E. Fresh; Jeff Bhasker; Kanye West; MC Ricky D.	4	2011	
"Party" †	Beyoncé featuring J. Cole	Beyoncé; Consequence; Doug E. Fresh; Jeff Bhasker; J. Cole; Kanye West; MC Ricky D	—N/a	2011	
"Pepsi's Carmen" (Note: Beyoncé recorded "Pepsi's Carmen" for a 2003 Pepsi Commercial.)	Beyoncé	Unknown	—N/a	2003	
"Perfect Duet" †	Ed Sheeran and Beyoncé	Ed Sheeran; Beyoncé	—N/a	2017	
"Pink + White"	Frank Ocean (additional vocals by Beyoncé)	Christopher Breaux; Pharrell Williams	Blonde	2016	
"Plastic Off the Sofa"	Beyoncé	Beyoncé; Sydney Bennett; Sabrina Claudio; Nick Green; Patrick Paige II	Renaissance	2022	
"Poison"	Beyoncé	Beyoncé; Johntá Austin; Stargate	I Am... Sasha Fierce*	2009	
"Pray" (uncredited)	Jay-Z featuring Beyoncé	Alan Hawkshaw; Deleno Matthews; Levar Coppin; Diddy; Jay-Z	American Gangster	2007	
"Pray You Catch Me"	Beyoncé	Kevin Garrett; Beyoncé; James Blake	Lemonade	2016	
"Pretty Hurts"	Beyoncé	Beyoncé; Ammo; Sia	Beyoncé	2013	
"Protector"	Beyoncé; Rumi Carter	Beyoncé; Ryan Beatty; Jack Rochon; Camaron Ochs	Cowboy Carter	2024	
"Pure/Honey"	Beyoncé	Beyoncé; Michael Tucker; Darius Scott; Michael Pollack; Denisia Andrews; Brittany Coney; Terius Nash; Raphael Saadiq; Moi Renée; Eric Snead; Jerel Black; Michael Cox; Kevin Bellmon Richard Cowie; Count Maurice	Renaissance	2022	
"Put It in a Love Song" †	Alicia Keys featuring Beyoncé	Alicia Keys; Swizz Beatz	The Element of Freedom	2009	
"Radio"	Beyoncé	Beyoncé; D-Town; Jim Jonsin; Rico Love	I Am... Sasha Fierce	2008	
"Rather Die Young"	Beyoncé	Beyoncé; Jeff Bhasker; Luke Steele	4	2011	
"Resentment" (Note: "Resentment" samples "Think (Instrumental)" by Curtis Mayfield.)	Beyoncé	Beyoncé; Candice Nelson; Curtis Mayfield; Walter Millsap III	B'Day	2006	
"Ring Off" †	Beyoncé	Beyoncé; Mike Caren; Cook Classics; Geoff Early; Charles Hinshaw; Adam Amezaga; Derek Dixie; Stephen Bishop; Hit-Boy; Mike Dean; Sidney Swift	Beyoncé: Platinum Edition	2014	
"Ring the Alarm" †	Beyoncé	Beyoncé; Swizz Beatz; Sean Garrett	B'Day	2006	
"Rise Up"	Beyoncé	Beyoncé; Sia; Hit-Boy; Chase N. Cashe	Epic	2013	
"Riiverdance"	Beyoncé	Beyoncé; Terius Adamu Ya Gesteelde-Diamant; Rachel Keen; Mark Spears	Cowboy Carter	2024	
"Rocket"	Beyoncé	Beyoncé; Miguel; Timbaland; J-Roc; Justin Timberlake	Beyoncé	2013	
"Run the World (Girls)" † (Note: "Run the World (Girls)" samples "Pon de Floor" by Major Lazer.)	Beyoncé	Vybz Kartel; Beyoncé; Switch; Afrojack; Shea Taylor; The-Dream; Diplo	4	2011	
"Runnin' (Lose It All)" †	Naughty Boy featuring Beyoncé and Arrow Benjamin	Beyoncé; Arrow Benjamin; Carla Marie Williams; Jonny Coffer; Naughty Boy	—N/a	2015	
"Sandcastles"	Beyoncé	Beyoncé; Vincent Berry II; Malik Yusef; Midian Mathers	Lemonade	2016	
"Satellites"	Beyoncé	Beyoncé; Amanda Ghost; Dave McCracken; Ian Dench	I Am... Sasha Fierce	2008	
"Savage (Remix)" †	Megan Thee Stallion featuring Beyoncé	Megan Pete; Beyoncé; Anthony White; Bobby Sessions Jr. Derrick Milano; Terius Nash; Jorden Thorpe; Shawn Carter; Brittany Hazzard	Good News	2020	
"Save the Hero"	Beyoncé	Beyoncé; Ali Tamposi; Jim Jonsin; Rico Love	I Am... Sasha Fierce*	2008	
"Say Yes"	Michelle Williams featuring Beyoncé and Kelly Rowland	Michelle Williams; Carmen Reece; Al Sherrod Lambert; Harmony Samuels	Journey to Freedom	2014	
"Scared of Lonely"	Beyoncé	Beyoncé; Cristyle; Darkchild; LaShawn Daniels; Rico Love; Solange Knowles	I Am... Sasha Fierce	2008	
"Schoolin' Life"	Beyoncé	Beyoncé; Carlos McKinney; Shea Taylor; The-Dream	4	2011	
"See Me Now"	Kanye West featuring Beyoncé, Big Sean and Charlie Wilson	Beyoncé; Big Sean; Charlie Wilson; Kanye West	My Beautiful Dark Twisted Fantasy	2010	
"Signs"	Beyoncé featuring Missy Elliott	Craig Brockman; Missy Elliott; Nisan Stewart	Dangerously in Love	2003	
"Sing a Song" (Note: "Sing a Song" is a single released for the Wow! Wow! Wubbzy! film Wubb Idol, which starred Beyoncé as Shine, a member of The WubbGirlz.)	The WubbGirlz featuring Beyoncé as Shine	Beyoncé; Bob Boyle; Brad Mossman; Eddie Smith III; John Powell; Johnathan Wells; Mike Reagan	Wow! Wow! Wubbzy!: Sing-a-Song	2009	
"Single Ladies (Put a Ring on It)" †	Beyoncé	Beyoncé; Kuk Harrell; The-Dream; Tricky Stewart	I Am... Sasha Fierce	2008	
"Smash Into You"	Beyoncé	Beyoncé; The-Dream; Tricky Stewart	I Am... Sasha Fierce	2008	
"Smash Into You"	Beyoncé	Beyoncé; The-Dream; Tricky Stewart	Obsessed	2009	
"So Amazing"	Beyoncé and Stevie Wonder	Benjamin Wright; Luther Vandross	So Amazing: An All-Star Tribute to Luther Vandross	2005	
"Sorry" †	Beyoncé	Wynter Gordon; Beyoncé; Melo-X	Lemonade	2016	
"Sorry Not Sorry"	DJ Khaled featuring Nas, Jay-Z, James Fauntleroy, and Beyoncé as Harmonies by the Hive	Khaled Khaled; Nasir Jones; Shawn Carter; James Fauntleroy II; Beyoncé Knowles-Carter; Kevin Cossom	Khaled Khaled	2021	
"Spaghettii"	Beyoncé; Linda Martell; Shaboozey	Beyoncé; Terius Adamu Ya Gesteelde-Diamant; Shawn Carter; Collins Chibueze; Tyler Johnson; Dedé Mandrake	Cowboy Carter	2024	
"Speechless"	Beyoncé	Andreao Heard; Angela Beyince; Beyoncé; Sherrod Barnes	Dangerously in Love	2003	
"Spirit"	Beyoncé	Ilya Salmanzadeh; Timothy Lee McKenzie; Beyoncé Knowles Carter	The Lion King: The Gift; The Lion King: Original Motion Picture Soundtrack	2019	
"Standing on the Sun"	Beyoncé featuring Mr. Vegas	Beyoncé; Sia; Greg Kurstin; Detail; Andre Eric Proctor; Rasool Díaz; Brian Soko	Beyoncé: Platinum Edition	2014	
"Star Spangled Banner" † (Note: "The Star-Spangled Banner" is the national anthem of the United States of America. This recording is Beyoncé's a cappella performance at Super Bowl XXXVIII (2004).)	Beyoncé	Francis Scott Key	—N/a	2004	
"Start Over"	Beyoncé	Beyoncé; Ester Dean; Shea Taylor	4	2011	
"Step on Over"	Beyoncé, Anika Noni Rose and Sharon Leal	Henry Krieger; Tom Eyen	Dreamgirls	2006	
"Steppin' to the Bad Side"	Beyoncé, Anika Noni Rose, Eddie Murphy, Hinton Battle, Jamie Foxx, Jennifer Hudson and Keith Robinson	Henry Krieger; Tom Eyen	Dreamgirls	2006	
"Still in Love (Kissing You)" (Note: "Still in Love (Kissing You)" is Beyoncé's 2007 re-recording of Des'ree's 1997 song "Kissing You".)	Beyoncé	Beyoncé; Des'ree; Timothy Atack	B'Day	2007	
"Stop That!" (Note: "Stop That!" is titled as "Argument in Motel" in film credits.)	Beyoncé and Mekhi Phifer	Kip Collins	Carmen: A Hip Hopera	2001	
"Suga Mama" (Note: "Suga Mama" samples "Searching for Soul" by Jake Wade and the Soul Searchers.)	Beyoncé	Beyoncé; Chuck Middleton; Makeba Riddick; Rich Harrison	B'Day	2006	
"Summer Renaissance"	Beyoncé	Beyoncé; Denisia Andrews; Brittany Coney; Terius Nash; Leven Kali; Mike Dean; Atia Boggs; Levar Coppin; Saliou Diagne; Ricky Lawson; Donna Summer; Giorgio Moroder; Peter Bellotte	Renaissance	2022	
"Summertime" †	Beyoncé featuring P. Diddy	Adonis Shropshire; Angela Beyince; Beyoncé; Mario Winans; P. Diddy; Stevie J Smitty	The Fighting Temptations	2003	
"Superpower"	Beyoncé featuring Frank Ocean	Beyoncé; Pharrell Williams; Frank Ocean	Beyoncé	2013	
"Sweet Dreams" †	Beyoncé	Beyoncé; Jim Jonsin; Rico Love; Wayne Wilkins	I Am... Sasha Fierce	2008	
"Sweet Honey Buckiin'"	Beyoncé; Shaboozey	Beyoncé; Pharrell Williams; Collins Chibueze; Terius Adamu Ya Gesteelde-Diamant; Shawn Carter; Hank Cochran; Harlan Howard	Cowboy Carter	2024	
"Telephone" †	Lady Gaga featuring Beyoncé	Beyoncé; Lady Gaga; Darkchild; LaShawn Daniels; Lazonate Franklin	The Fame Monster	2009	
"Texas Hold 'Em" †	Beyoncé	Beyoncé; Elizabeth Lowell Boland; Megan Bülow; Brian Bates; Nathan Ferraro; Raphael Saadiq	Cowboy Carter	2024	
"That's How You Like It" (Note: "That's How You Like It" contains resung lyrics from "I Like It" by DeBarge.)	Beyoncé featuring Jay-Z	Brian Bridgeman; Bunny DeBarge; Delroy Andrews; El DeBarge; Jay-Z; Randy DeBarge	Dangerously in Love	2003	
"That's Why You're Beautiful"	Beyoncé	Beyoncé; Andrew Hey; James Fauntleroy II	I Am... Sasha Fierce	2008	
"Thique"	Beyoncé	Beyoncé; Terius Nash; Chauncey Hollis Jr. Atia Boggs; Julian Mason; Jabbar Stevens; Cherdericka Nichols	Renaissance	2022	
"Time to Come Home"	Beyoncé, Angie Stone and Melba Moore	James "Big Jim" Wright"; Jimmy Jam and Terry Lewis	The Fighting Temptations	2003	
"Trust in Me"	Beyoncé	Jean Schwartz; Milton Ager; Ned Wever	Cadillac Records	2008	
"Turnt"	The-Dream featuring Beyoncé and 2 Chainz	Beyoncé; The-Dream; 2 Chainz	IV Play	2013	
"Tyrant"	Beyoncé; Dolly Parton	Beyoncé; Camaron Ochs; Terius Adamu Ya Gesteelde-Diamant; David Doman; Dominic Redenczki; Ezemdi Chikwendu	Cowboy Carter	2024	
"Until the End of Time" †	Justin Timberlake and Beyoncé	Justin Timberlake; Danja; Timbaland	FutureSex/LoveSounds	2007	
"Up&Up" †	Coldplay featuring Beyoncé, Merry Clayton, Annabelle Wallis, Noel Gallagher and Moses Martin (uncredited)	Coldplay	A Head Full of Dreams	2015	
"Upgrade U" † (Note: "Upgrade U" samples "Girls Can't Do What the Guys Do (And Still Be a Lady)" by Betty Wright.)	Beyoncé featuring Jay-Z	Angela Beyince; Beyoncé; Blowfly; Makeba Riddick; Rich Harrison; Sean Garrett; Jay-Z; Solange Knowles; Willie Clarke	B'Day	2006	
"Venus vs. Mars"	Jay-Z featuring Beyoncé (uncredited)	Jay-Z; Jerome Harmon; Timbaland	The Blueprint 3	2009	
"Video Phone" †	Beyoncé	Beyoncé; Angela Beyince; Bangladesh; Sean Garrett	I Am... Sasha Fierce	2008	
"Virgo's Groove"	Beyoncé	Beyoncé; Leven Kali; Solomon Cole; Daniel Memmi; Dustin Bowie; Darius Scott; Jocelyn Donald; Jesse Wilson; Denisia Andrews; Brittany Coney	Renaissance	2022	
"Water"	Salatiel, Pharrell and Beyoncé	Beyoncé; Nana Afriyie; Nija Charles; Richard Isong	The Lion King: The Gift	2019	
"We Will Rock You" (Note: Beyoncé, Britney Spears and P!nk covered Queen's 1977 song "We Will Rock You" for an international commercial Pepsi campaign. The song was released on Pepsi Music 2004 CD.)	Beyoncé, Britney Spears and P!nk	Brian May	Pepsi Music 2004 CD	2002	
"Welcome to Hollywood" (Note: "Welcome to Hollywood" is Beyoncé's 2007 re-recording of Jay-Z's 2006 song "Hollywood".)	Beyoncé	Beyoncé; Syience; Ne-Yo; Jay-Z	B'Day	2007	
"What's It Gonna Be" † (Note: "What's It Gonna Be" contains a sample of Zapp's "Do It Roger", written by Larry Troutman and Roger Troutman.)	Beyoncé	Beyoncé; Corte Ellis; LaShaun Owens; Kandice Love; Karrim Mack; Larry Troutman; Roger Troutman	Dangerously in Love*	2003	
"What More Can I Give" †	The All Stars	Michael Jackson	September 11 attacks Inspiration promo	2001	
"When I First Saw You (Duet)"	Beyoncé and Jamie Foxx	Henry Krieger; Tom Eyen	Dreamgirls	2006	
"Why Don't You Love Me" †	Beyoncé	Beyoncé; Angela Beyince; Bama Boyz; Solange Knowles	I Am... Sasha Fierce*	2009	
"Wishing on a Star" (Note: "Wishing on a Star" is 1978 a song originally performed by Rose Royce.)	Beyoncé	Billie Rae Calvin	Live at Wembley	2004	
"Wishing on a Star" †	Beyoncé	Billie Rae Calvin	—N/a	2010	
"Work It Out"	Beyoncé	Beyoncé; The Neptunes	Austin Powers in: Goldmember	2002	
"World Wide Woman"	Beyoncé	Angela Beyince; Beyoncé; LaShawn Daniels; Makeba Riddick; Rodney Jerkins; Sean Garrett	B'Day	2007	
"XO" †	Beyoncé	Beyoncé; The-Dream; Ryan Tedder	Beyoncé	2013	
"Ya Ya"	Beyoncé	Beyoncé; Terius Adamu Ya Gesteelde-Diamant; Shawn Carter; Oliver Rodigan; Harry Edwards; Klara Mkhatshwa Munk-Hansen; Anaïs Marinho; Lee Hazlewood; Brian Wilson; Mike Love	Cowboy Carter	2024	
"Yes"	Beyoncé	Focus... Beyoncé; Jay-Z	Dangerously in Love	2003	
"You Changed"	Kelly Rowland featuring Beyoncé and Michelle Williams	Kelly Rowland; Courtney Harrell; Harmony Samuels	Talk a Good Game	2013	
"Young Forever" (Live)	Jay-Z featuring Beyoncé	Jay-Z; Alphaville	Live in Brooklyn	2012	

== Unreleased songs ==
Song	Artist(s)	Writer(s)	Originating album	Ref.
"632-5792"	Beyoncé	Unknown	Unknown	
"Bad"	Beyoncé	Nikita Victoria Riddick	Unknown	
"Beat My Drum"	Beyoncé	Beyoncé; Sean Garrett; Tracey Serwell	Unknown	
"Beauty of Love"	Beyoncé	Kara Dioguardi; Reginald Perry	Unknown	
"Black Culture" (Note: "Black Culture" samples "Don't Stop 'Til You Get Enough" by Michael Jackson.)	Beyoncé	Beyoncé; Stargate; Chad Hugo; Pharrell Williams; Quincy Jones; Michael Jackson	I Am... Sasha Fierce	
"Butterfly"	Beyoncé	Damond Nichols	Unknown	
"Chart Topper"	Beyoncé	Beyoncé	Unknown	
"Erotic"	Beyoncé	Amanda Ghost; Beyoncé; Johntá Austin	Unknown	
"Fill Up"	Beyoncé	Michael La Vell McGregor; Beyoncé	Unknown	
"Forever to Bleed"	Beyoncé	Clinton Sparks	I Am... Sasha Fierce	
"Free Fall"	Beyoncé	Jerome Harmon; Beyoncé; Timothy Mosley; Justin Timberlake; James Fauntleroy; Christopher Godbey	Unknown	
"Hold My Beer"	Beyoncé	Errol McCalla Jr. Beyoncé	Unknown	
"I'm Glad There's You"	Beyoncé	Jimmy Dorsey; Paul Madeira	Dangerously in Love	
"I'm Leaving"	Beyoncé	Ken Fambro; Beyoncé	Unknown	
"Ice Cream Truck"	Beyoncé	Unknown	Unknown	
"In Love With Love"	Beyoncé	Errol McCalla Jr. Beyoncé; Marvis Levon Ricks	Unknown	
"Life"	Beyoncé	Ryan Tedder; Beyoncé; Brent Kutzle	Unknown	
"More Than The Opposite Sex"	Beyoncé	Daryl E. Young; Beyoncé	Unknown	
"Murder on the Dancefloor"	Beyoncé	Nikita Victoria Riddick	Unknown	
"My Body"	Beyoncé	Alonzo Stevenson; Beyoncé; Crystal Johnson; Tony Reyes	Unknown	
"New Shoes (Postcard)"	Beyoncé	Beyoncé; Solange Knowles; Deconzo R. Smith	Unknown	
"Owls Go"	Beyoncé	Cameron David Bird; Cecil James; Beyoncé	Unknown	
"Roc"	Beyoncé	Johntá Austin; Mikkel Storleer Eriksen; Tor Erik Hermansen	Unknown	
"Runway"	Beyoncé	Terius Nash; Beyoncé	Unknown	
"Scent of You"	Beyoncé	Bryce Wilson	Dangerously in Love	
"Settle for You"	Beyoncé	Shawn Carter; Makeda Davis; Beyoncé; Bryce Wilson	Dangerously in Love	
"Sexuality"	Beyoncé	Unknown	Unknown	
"Sexy Lil' Thug" (Note: "Sexy Lil' Thug" is Beyoncé's 2003 re-recording of 50 Cent's 2003 song "In da Club".)	Beyoncé	Dr. Dre; 50 Cent; Mike Elizondo	Unknown	
"Vulnerable"	Beyoncé	Chad Hugo; Beyoncé; Pharrell Williams	Unknown	
"Waiting"	Beyoncé	Mikkel Storleer Eriksen; Shaffer Smith; Tor Erik Hermansen	I Am... Sasha Fierce	
"Wake Up"	Beyoncé	Beyoncé; Pharrell Williams	Unknown	
"What Kind of World"	Beyoncé	Louis Biancaniello; Jim Jonsin; Sam Watters	Unknown	
"Wrapped Around Me"	Beyoncé	Missy Elliott	Dangerously in Love	

== See also ==
- Beyoncé discography
- List of best-selling music artists
- Destiny's Child discography
