= MTV's Hip Hopera: Carmen =

Soundtrack album by various artists
- Released: June 12, 2001
- Recorded: 2000–2001
- Studio: Hit Factory, Mirror Image, Right Track and ULB Studios (New York, New York); Music Grinder Studios (Los Angeles, California); Southside and Doppler Studios, (Atlanta, Georgia)
- Genre: Hip-hop; R&B; funk; soul
- Length: 34:40
- Label: MTV; Music World; Columbia Records; Sony Music
- Producer: Kip Collins; Anthony Dent; Beyoncé Knowles; DJ Premier; Megahertz; Missy Elliott; Rockwilder; Mathew Knowles

MTV's Hip Hopera: Carmen is a soundtrack album for the 2001 film Carmen: A Hip Hopera, released by Music World Entertainment and Columbia Records in partnership with MTV on June 12, 2001. The soundtrack is composed of 10 songs recorded exclusively for the film's storyline, written by Sekani Williams, produced by Kip Collins and performed by the film's cast of actors. It also features remixes of two Destiny's Child then-current singles ("Survivor" and "Bootylicious") and the single "Boom" by Royce da 5'9", originally released in 1999.

The reception of the album was mixed, with Steven Oxman from Variety both celebrating an attempt to "bridge a gap that had seemed impassable" between opera and hip-hop, and remarking that "rhythm and tone... take priority over subtlety" when dissecting the lyrical weight of the musical. In another mixed review, Alona Wartofsky of The Washington Post praised the "star power", but was disappointed with both lyrical and production imperfections.

In retrospect, the soundtrack was noted for remaining "unique, in a genre all its own" citing the "outrageous word of Sekani Williams' singular lyrics" and mentioning the album "captures a lot of cultural shifts happening at once, MTV's transition out of music programming into other ventures, the rise of hip hop to a place of dominance in the music industry and the post-modern fascination with blending classical and new styles", citing the song "Survivor" as one example.

Another retrospective review published at Dazed called Beyoncé's acting debut "criminally underrated" noting that "for what she lacks in convincing dialogue she makes up for in her rapped verses". Further praise was given to "the mix of hip hop heavyweights like Da Brat, Rah Diggah and Mos Def rapping along with the usually tuneful singer and actors who have never rapped before makes for entertaining and sometimes slightly hilarious viewing".

== Track listing ==
No.	Title	Writer(s)	Producer(s)	Length
1.	"The Introduction" (Da Brat)	Sekani Williams; Kip Collins	Collins	1:02
2.	"Survivor (Extended Remix)" (Destiny's Child featuring Da Brat)	Beyonce Knowles; Anthony Dent; Mathew Knowles	Knowles; Dent	4:24
3.	"Boom" (Royce da 5′9″)	Ryan Daniel Montgomery; Christopher Martin	DJ Premier	3:53
4.	"What We Gonna Do" (Rah Digga)	Rashia Fisher; Trevor Smith Jr.; Dorsey Wesley	Megahurtz Music Group	3:51
5.	"If Looks Could Kill (You Would Be Dead)" (Beyoncé, Mos Def & Sam Sarpong)	Williams	Collins	2:05
6.	"Cards Never Lie" (Beyoncé, Wyclef Jean & Rah Digga)	Williams; Collins	Collins	2:42
7.	"The Last Great Seduction" (Beyoncé & Mekhi Phifer)	Williams; Collins	Collins	2:22
8.	"B.L.A.Z.E." (Casey Lee, Rah Digga & Joy Bryant)	Williams; Collins	Collins	2:25
9.	"Black & Blue" (Mos Def & Mekhi Phifer)	Collins	Collins	1:50
10.	"Stop That!" (Beyoncé & Mekhi Phifer)	Collins	Collins	1:58
11.	"Blaze (Finale)" (Casey Lee)	Williams; Collins	Collins	2:41
12.	"Immortal Beloved (Outro)" (Da Brat)	Williams; Collins	Collins	1:15
13.	"Bootylicious (Rockwilder Remix)" (Destiny's Child & Missy Elliott)	Melissa Elliott; Knowles; Falonte Moore; Rob Fusari	Elliott; Knowles; Rockwilder	4:12
Total length:				34:40

== Personnel ==
Credits adapted from Apple Music, Discogs, and Spotify.

- Da Brat - Featured Artist (1–2,12)
- Destiny's Child - Featured Artist (2,13)
- Royce da 5′9″ - Featured Artist (3)
- Rah Digga - Featured Artist (4,6,8)
- Beyoncé - Featured Artist (5–7,10)
- Mos Def - Featured Artist (5,9)
- Sam Sarpong - Featured Artist (5)
- Wyclef Jean - Featured Artist (6)
- Mekhi Phifer - Featured Artist (7, 9–10)
- Casey Lee - Featured Artist (8,11)
- Joy Bryant - Featured Artist (8)
- Kip Collins – Producer (1, 5–12), Recording Engineer (1, 4–12)
- Beyonce Knowles - Producer (2,13)
- Anthony Dent - Producer (2)
- DJ Premier - Producer (3)
- Missy Elliott - Producer (13)
- Rockwilder - Producer (13)
- Kenny Blank - Mixing Engineer (1, 4–12)
- Tom Coyne - Mastering Engineer (1–13)
- Larry Fergusson – Recording Engineer (1, 4–12)
- Samie Barela – Recording Engineer (1, 4–12)
- Brian D. Frye – Recording Engineer (1,12)
- Tony Maserati - Mixing Engineer (2)
- Blake Eiseman - Recording Engineer (2)
- Veeriniqua Green - Background Vocals (3)
- Octavia Lambertis - Background Vocals (3)
- Michael Elliot - Executive Producer
- Mathew Knowles - Executive Producer
- Chris Gehringer - Mastering Engineer (3)
- Eddie Sancho - Recording Engineer (3)
- Dexter Thibou - Recording Engineer (3)
- Andy Grassi - Recording Engineer (6)
- Mike Koch - Engineer (13)
- Mike Hogan - Engineer (13)
- Brian Garten - Engineer (13)
- Bruno Sutter - Engineer (13)
- Dave Pensado - Mixing Engineer (13)
- Teresa LaBarbera Whites - A&R Executive
- Kim Burse - A&R Coordinator
- Chris Gorman - Photography (Rose Petals)
- Carol Caelson - Photography (Movie Stills)
- Dorothy Low - Photography (Movie Stills)
