= Slow Love =

Slow Love may refer to:

Music

- "Slow Love", an unofficially released song by Beyoncé
- "Slow Love", a song by Prince from Sign o' the Times, 1987
- "Slow Love", a song by Usher from his eponymous debut album, 1994
- "Slow Love", an album by Gino Vannelli

Literature

- Slow Love: How I Lost my Job, Put on My Pajamas, and Found Happiness, a 2010 book by Dominique Browning

Television

- "Slow Love", an episode of Adventure Time
