= Miracle at St. Anna (soundtrack) =

Miracle at St. Anna (Original Soundtrack)

Film score by Terence Blanchard
- Released: September 23, 2008
- Recorded: 2008
- Genre: Film score
- Length: 75:56
- Label: Hollywood
- Producer: Terence Blanchard

Terence Blanchard chronology
Talk to Me (2007)	Miracle at St. Anna (2008)	Cadillac Records (2008)

Miracle at St. Anna (Original Soundtrack) is the film score to the 2008 film Miracle at St. Anna directed by Spike Lee. The film score is composed by Lee's regular collaborator Terence Blanchard and released through September 23, 2008 under the Hollywood Records label.

== Background ==
The film's original score is composed by Terence Blanchard in his twelfth collaboration with Lee. Inspired by the script, Blanchard decided to join the film much earlier than production, as the film reminded of his early days in New Orleans where the Buffalo Soldiers marching in parades did not realize the significant role they played on fighting for the freedom and he wanted to tell a small segment of those soldiers dealt with in their history.

Lee had specific direction in guiding Blanchard's score, where he wanted to show the heroism of these soldiers and did not make the action the primary source of inspiration. He sent him few images, which Blanchard complimented it as he waited to start homing in to the musical identity for the film before watching the visuals, as it had sent him to a different direction. He admitted that the process that he and Lee was challenging as the latter would assign melodies to the characters, while he structures them. He attempted to draw a distinction between American and German soldiers, which was first done through percussions, using "a higher-pitched, tighter sound for Germans, and a fuller-field drum sound for Americans," while also using French horns for American forces, and a Wagner tuben for German forces to distinguish them.

Blanchard use a 90-piece orchestra which was larger than in any of Lee's films, while further relied on the use of instruments from the 1940s era, including a mandolin, accordion, slide guitar and rope drum.

Blanchard considered working on the film being much difficult due to the grandeur, at later interviews. He noted that for the opening battle sequence in the film, Blanchard wrote a "percussive and brass laden" piece, but Lee denied as he wanted to show the heroism of their sacrifice, resulting in a more melodic and operatic approach.

== Release ==
The film's soundtrack, titled Miracle at St. Anna (Original Soundtrack), was released in CD and digital downloading formats by Hollywood Records on September 23, 2008.

== Track listing ==
No.	Title	Length
1.	"Opening Credits"	1:11
2.	"Main Theme"	4:04
3.	"Tim Boyle Theme"	4:12
4.	"The Primavera"	0:57
5.	"War Is Hell"	11:58
6.	"Theme of an Angel" (Part 1)	3:00
7.	"White Commander"	0:55
8.	"Renata You're Beautiful Theme"	1:47
9.	"Third Reich"	5:13
10.	"Great Butterfly" (Part 1)	1:45
11.	"Paisans Theme" (Part 1)	2:31
12.	"Stamps & Bishop Argue"	1:36
13.	"Main Theme at Herbs"	3:50
14.	"Theme of an Angel" (Part 2)	1:17
15.	"Paisans Theme" (Part 2)	1:46
16.	"Main Theme / The Prayer"	1:11
17.	"Renata You're Beautiful Theme / Bishop and Renata"	1:23
18.	"Paisans / The Massacre"	1:21
19.	"Great Butterfly" (Part 2)	5:31
20.	"War Is Hell / Final Battle"	7:14
21.	"Theme of an Angel" (Part 3)	2:17
22.	"War Is Hell / Mourn the Dead"	2:36
23.	"Finale Theme"	3:45
24.	"End Credits"	4:36
Total length:		75:56

== Reception ==
Kirk Honeycutt of The Hollywood Reporter wrote "Perhaps feeling insecure in all this melodrama, Lee lets composer Terence Blanchard blanket the film with a wall of sound, telling you how to feel and react at any given moment." Todd McCarthy of Variety wrote "Terence Blanchard's score drones on virtually throughout". A. O. Scott of The New York Times called it a "lush and mournful score". David Edelstein of New York wrote "Terence Blanchard’s nonstop symphonic stirrings color every exchange. On its own terms, the score is gorgeous; Blanchard transforms martial themes into sighing lamentations. But the music elegizes the characters before they can speak. Their doom is in every bar." Peter Travers of Rolling Stone called it "a mournful score by Terence Blanchard, that achieve enormous power". Chris Bumbray of JoBlo.com noted that, "for some reason Lee has his composer Terrence Blanchard, over-score the battle sequences to a ludicrous degree- which makes them seem like something out of the movie-within a movie from Tropic Thunder."

== Personnel ==
Credits adapted from liner notes:

- Music composed, produced and conducted by: Terence Blanchard
- Music editor: Marvin Morris
- Music preparation: Steven Juliani Music
- Orchestrators: Terence Blanchard, Howard Drossin
- Session coordinator: Robin Burgess
- Session assistant: Vincent Bennett
- Contractors: Sandy De Crescent, Peter Rotter
- Scoring crew: Adam Blake, Bryan Clements, DJ Brady, Mark Eshelman, Karim Elmahmoud, Jeannine Isaacs, Michael J. Lloyd, Layla Minoui, Nick Fevola, Steven Juliani, Greg Loskorn, Michael Pelavin, Marcus Sjöwall Jermaine Edward Stegall, Ben Watters
- Score recorded and mixed by: Frank Wolf
- Recorded at: Sony Scoring Stage, Sony Pictures Studios
- Mixed at: Manhattan Center Studios, New York
- Mixing crew: Darren Moore, Halsey Quemere, Joel Scheuneman

Musicians

- Violins: Bruce Dukov, Julie Ann Gigante, Eun-Mee Ahn, Jacqueline Brand, Eve Butler, Caroline Campbell, Darius Campo, Roberto Cani, Mark Cargill, Ron Clark, Kevin Connolly, Mario De Leon, Nina Evtuhov, David Ewart, Endre Granat, Henry Gronnier, Alan Grunfeld, Tamara Hatwan, Amy Hershberger, Tiffany Hu, Miran Kojian, Aimee Kreston, Songa Lee, Natalie Leggett, Dimitrie Leivici, Marina Manukian, Liane Mautner, Marisa Mcleod, Cynthia Moussas, Helen Nightengale, Cheryl Norman, Sid Page, Alyssa Park, Sara Parkins, Roselani Ptacek, Rafael Rishik, Jay Rosen, Anatoly Rosinsky, Marc Sazer, Tereza Stanislav, Lisa M. Sutton, Lesa Terry, Sarah Thornblade, Josefina Vergara, Shalini Vijayan, Irina Voloshin, Roger Wilkie, Kenneth Yerke
- Violas: Brian Dembow, Robert Berg, Robert Brophy, Denyse Buffum, Thomas Diener, Andrew Duckles, Karen Elaine, Samuel Formicola, Matthew Funes, Rick Gerding, Pamela Goldsmith, Keith Greene, Jennie Hansen, Piotr Jandula, Shawn Mann, Darrin Mccann, Victoria Miskolczy, Jorge Moraga, Michael Nowak, Karie L. Prescott, Cassandra Richburg, Robin Ross, Harry Shirinian, Karen Van Sant, David Walther
- Celli: Steve Erdody, Giovanna Clayton, Paul Cohen, Antony Cooke, Paula Hochhalter, Dennis Karmazyn, Jennifer Lee Kuhn, Timothy Landauer, Dane Little, Earl Madison, Boris Nixon, George Kim Scholes, Andrew Shulman, Christina Soule, David Speltz, Cecelia Tsan
- Bass: Edward Meares, Nico Abondolo, Drew Dembowski, Oscar Hidalgo, Derrick Hodge Bruce Morgenthaler, Michael Valerio, Karl Vincent-Eickliff
- Flutes: James Walker, Michael Morton, Geraldine Rotella
- Clarinets: Stuart Clark, Gary Bovyer, Donald Foster, Jon Manasse
- Oboes: Phillip Ayling, Barbara Northcutt
- Bassoons: Michael O'Donovan, Rose Corrigan
- Horns: Brian O'Connor, Steven Becknell, Matt Dine, David Duke, Daniel Kelley, Jenny Kim, Paul Klintworth Yvonne, Suzette Moriarty, Kristy Morrell, Richard Todd, Robert Watt
- Trumpets: Malcolm Mcnab, Jon Lewis, Barry Perkins, Aaron Smith
- Trombones: Charles Loper, Alexander Iles, Kenneth Kugler, William Reichenbach, Robert Sanders, Reginald Young
- Percussion: Alan Estes, Timothy Adams, Raynor Carroll, Michael Fisher, Michael Grego, Peter Limonick, Steven Schaeffer, Kendrick Scott, Donald Williams
- Tuba: William Roper
- Guitar: Timothy Jr. Adams, George Doering
- Piano: Fabian Almazan
- Harp: Jo Ann Turovsky
- Accordion: Frank Marocco
