= Bankulli =

Nigerian music executive

- Born: Abisagboola Oluseun John; 24 December 1975 (age 50); Lagos
- Occupations: Talent manager; A&R executive; Promoter; Music executive; Singer; Songwriter
- Years active: 2001–present
- Known for: Bankulli Entertainment

Abisagboola Oluseun John popularly known as Bankulli or Osha, is a Nigerian music executive, A&R, talent manager, singer, and songwriter, pioneering the African pop culture. He is the founder and CEO of Bankulli Entertainment, known for housing recording acts, such as Basiil, and Konstance. He formerly served as the artiste manager of Mo' Hits Records, one of Africa's defunct recording companies owned by Don Jazzy, and D’banj. As a talent manager, he managed D'banj's solo career after Mo' Hits.

Bankulli has also worked with artists and producers around the world from Nigeria, the US, and the UK. In 2011, he worked on the collaborative studio project Watch The Throne, a 5× Platinum album created by Kanye West and Jay-Z. He went on to work with Kanye West on his sixth studio album Yeezus. In 2020, Beyoncé's The Lion King: The Gift soundtrack album, was nominated at the 62nd Annual Grammy Awards for Best Pop Vocal Album and earned him, a special recognition from The Recording Academy.

== Career ==
Bankulli began his music career at R70, a UK-based entertainment company owned by Ayo Shonaiya, and DJ Abass, where he worked as an internship. In 2019, Beyoncé released a soundtrack album titled The Lion King: The Gift, which Bankulli co-wrote two songs on the project alongside Beyoncé. The album also earned him his first Grammy nomination for his songwriting credit on "Find Your Way Back", and "Otherside". On 9 August 2019, Bankulli announced in a series of tweets about his documentary titled "Chronicles of Afrobeats" to be released soon, in the tweet he narrated how Don Jazzy became the first Afrobeats Music producer to represent the genre in the mainstream music scene in the U.S in 2011, to two greatest music genius of our time Kanye West, and Jay-Z, to how he ended doing vocals on two songs on Watch The Throne album.

== Discography ==
=== Collaborative eps ===
List of collaborative studio extended plays, with selected details and chart positions
Title	Details	Peak chart positions
Title	Details	NG
Journey Back Home (with. Töme)	Released: 26 November 2021; Label: Bankulli Entertainment; Formats: Digital download	

=== Singles ===
==== As lead artist ====
List of singles as lead artist, with year released and album shown
Title	Year	Peak chart positions						Certifications	Album
Title	Year	NG	NG Afropop	SA	UK	UK Afrobeats	US Afrobeats	Certifications	Album
"Gbemiro" (feat. Wurld)	2020	—	—	—	—	—	—		Non-album singles
"Gbemiro (Remix)" (feat. Hiro)	2020	—	—	—	—	—	—		Non-album singles
"Foreign" (feat. Not3s)	2021	—	—	—	—	6	—		Non-album singles
"Ekorin"	2021	—	—	—	—	—	—		The Last Ship
"Iye"	2021	—	—	—	—	—	—		The Last Ship
"All My Life" (feat. MohBad, Basiil, & Konstance)	2023	—	—	—	—	—	—		TBA

==== As featured artist ====
List of singles as featured artist, with year released, selected chart positions, certifications, and album name shown
Title	Year	Peak chart positions							Certifications	Album
Title	Year	NG	NG Afropop	SA	UK	UK Afrobeats	US Afrobeats	US R&B/HH	Certifications	Album
"Iyawo" (Thutmose featuring Bankulli)	2021	—	—	—	—	—	—	—		Best of Both Worlds: Side B
"Wedding Song" (Machel Montano featuring Bankulli)	2021	—	—	—	—	—	—	—		The Wedding Album
"—" denotes a recording that did not chart or was not released in that territory.

== Production discography ==
=== Selected songs produced and songwriting credit ===
Artist	Song	Album	Release date	Certifications	Label	Note
Jay-Z and Kanye West	"Lift Off" (feat. Beyoncé)	Watch the Throne	8 August 2011		Def Jam / Roc Nation \ Roc-A-Fella	Backup vocal
Jay-Z and Kanye West	"Illest Motherfucker Alive"	Watch the Throne	8 August 2011		Def Jam / Roc Nation \ Roc-A-Fella	Backup vocal
Shatta Wale	"Dancehall King"	Answers (The Hybrid)	14 March 2014		SM4LYF Records	Executive producer
Shatta Wale	"Dancehall King"	After the Storm	29 April 2016		Shatta Movement Music Production	Executive producer
Beyoncé	"Find Your Way Back"	The Lion King: The Gift	19 July 2019		Parkwood / Columbia	Co-writer
Beyoncé	"Otherside"	The Lion King: The Gift	19 July 2019		Parkwood / Columbia	Co-writer
Davido	"Stand Strong" (feat. Sunday Service Choir)	Non-album single	13 May 2022		DMW / Sony	Vocal production for The Samples
Basiil	"Vibration"	I Know I Am	2 June 2023		Bankulli Entertainment	Executive Producer
Basiil	"Come Alive" (feat. 4Korners)	I Know I Am	7 July 2023		Bankulli Entertainment	Executive Producer
Konstance	"Melo"	TBA	31 August 2023		Bankulli Entertainment	Executive Producer
Konstance	"For You"	TBA	1 December 2023		Bankulli Entertainment	Executive Producer
Basiil	"Falling" (feat. Camidoh)	Falling with My Idols	1 December 2023		Bankulli Entertainment	Executive Producer
Basiil	"Falling" (feat. Nonso Amadi)	Falling with My Idols	1 December 2023		Bankulli Entertainment	Executive Producer
Basiil	"Falling" (feat. Ladipoe)	Falling with My Idols	1 December 2023		Bankulli Entertainment	Executive Producer

=== Selected albums produced ===
Artist	Album	Release date	Certifications	Label	Note
Jay-Z and Kanye West	Watch the Throne	8 August 2011		Def Jam / Roc Nation / Roc-A-Fella	Backup vocal credit
Kanye West	Yeezus	18 June 2013		Def Jam / Roc-A-Fella	Backup vocal credit
Beyoncé	The Lion King: The Gift	19 July 2019		Parkwood / Columbia	Co-writer
Bankulli and Töme	Journey Back Home	26 November 2021		Bankulli Entertainment	Executive producer
Basil	I Know I Am	21 July 2023		Bankulli Entertainment	Executive producer
Shatta Wale	Konekt	TBA		TBA	Executive producer
