= Kip Collins =

American musical artist (1980–2019)

- Born: Alarza Lee "Kip" Collins Jr. April 26, 1969; Queens, New York City
- Died: August 31, 2006 (aged 37) Hempstead, New York
- Occupations: Songwriter; Producer

Alarza Lee "Kip" Collins Jr. (April 26, 1969 – August 31, 2006) was an American record producer and composer who had collaborated with a number of music artists in the 1990s and early 2000s.

== Early life ==
Collins, the only son of Alarza Collins and Betty Scott Collins, was born in Queens, New York City. Demonstrating an early interest in music and motorcycles, he attended The Harlem School of the Arts in Manhattan and Maria Regina High School in Hartsdale and graduated from Hempstead High School where he played saxophone in the marching band. Collins later graduated from Morgan State University with a dregree in communications and television broadcasting.

== Career ==
In the early 1990s, Collins started his path of professional musical collaborations by taking on Keith and Hank Shockley of the Bomb Squad as one of his first clients. In 1993, he collaborated with R&B singer Aaron Hall on the album The Truth. In 1995, he collaborated with singer Monifah on her song "I Miss You". Collins went on to work with artists such as Heavy D and contribute songs to the Living Single soundtrack. He was the music director for the Warner Brothers sitcom Built to Last in 1997. In 2000, Collins wrote, produced, and played instruments for Faith Evans and Jennifer Lopez. The same year, he was hired to create the musical score and produce numerous songs for MTV's Carmen: A Hip Hopera, a musical romantic drama television film, directed by Robert Townsend and starring Beyoncé Knowles. Later on in 2002, Collins became the musical director and composer for the UPN TV series Half & Half.

== Death ==
Collins died on August 31, 2006, at the age of 37, from injuries sustained in a motorcycle crash. He had been riding his 2000 Yamaha motorcycle when his bike collided with a car backing out of a driveway near Uniondale, New York. Collins was pronounced dead after being taken to Nassau University Medical Center. He was buried on September 11, 2006 at Sunset Cemetery in Asheville, North Carolina.

== Discography ==
Year	Album	Song / Artist	Role
1993	The Truth	Aaron Hall	Programming
1993	Joy and Blues	"Head Top" – Ziggy Marley and the Melody Makers	Keyboards/Drum Programming
1994	Time to Taste Bass	"Dancin' Dirty" – Dirty Curt	Producer/Engineer/Mixing
1994	Debelah	Debelah Morgan	Producer
1996	Moods…Moments	"You Don't Have To Love Me"; "I Miss You (Come Back Home)"; "Nobody's Body"; "It's Alright" –Monifah	Producer/Keyboards
1997	Living Single: Music from & Inspired by the Hit TV Show	"Don't Waste My Time" – Esaga (featuring Pamela Bryant), "Gamin" – Deborah Williams, "I Commit to You" – Chris Gaddy & Pamela Bryant	Mixing/Guitar/Programming/Producer/Engineer
1999	The Notorious K.I.M.	"Hold On" – Lil' Kim	Keyboards
2000	Love Crimes	"Are You Fuckin' Around" – Ruff Endz	Producer
2001	MTV's Hip Hopera: Carmen	"The Introduction" – Da Brat, "What We Gonna Do" – Rah Digga, "If Looks Could Kill (You Would Be Dead)" – Beyoncé ft. Mos Def, Sam Sarpong, "Cards Never Lie" – Beyoncé ft. Wyclef Jean, Rah Digga, "The Last Great Seduction" – Beyoncé ft. Mehki Phifer, "B.L.A.Z.E" – Rah Digga ft. Casey Lee, Joy Bryant, "Black & Blue" – Mos Def ft. Mekhi Phifer, "Stop That!" – Beyoncé ft. Mekhi Phifer, "Blaze Finale" – Casey Lee, "Immortal Beloved (Outro)" – Da Brat	Producer/ Engineer
2001	J. Lo	"Come Over" - Jennifer Lopez	Instrumentation/Producer
2001	Faithfully	"Brand New Man" - Faith Evans	Producer
2001	Kamnesia	"Benefits" - Kam	Producer
2002-2006	Half & Half	UPN Television Show	Music Supervisor / Theme Song / Scene Cues
2006	Uncovered/Covered	"Just a Dream" - Kenny Lattimore/Chante Moore	Producer/Engineer
