= Töme =

Nigerian alt-R&B singer

- Born: Michelle Oluwatomi Akanbi; 17 September 1997 (age 28); Montreal, Canada
- Occupations: Singer; songwriter; record producer
- Years active: 2019 - present
- Musical career
- Genres: Alternative R&B; Afro beats; Pop
- Instruments: Vocals, Guitar
- Label: Kiza Music

Michelle Oluwatomi Akanbi (born September 17, 1997), better known as Töme, is a Nigerian-French Canadian singer, songwriter and actor born in Montreal, Quebec, Canada. In 2020, Tome won the 2021 edition of the Juno awards for her single ‘I Pray’ ft Sean Kingston. She has shared the stage with African superstars like Burna boy, Wizkid, Mr Eazi and has collaborated with pop stars like King Promise, Runtown, Zlatan, Wavy the Creator and Sean Kingston.

== Early life ==
Töme was born on September 17, 1997, in Montreal, Canada to a Nigerian father from Osun state and a Canadian mother. She began singing at the age of 8 and picked up the guitar at age 10 in Brampton, Ontario, where she grew up. She grew up listening to artists like Erykah Badu, Lauren Hill, Wizkid, and Alicia Keys, who influenced her music.

== Career ==
Before her career in music, Töme worked with a software company named ’Tran Score’ as a customer service representative. She quit the job to pursue music full-time when the latter started to take up more of her schedule. In 2015, she released her debut EP ’One with Self’ on SoundCloud. This was followed by her sophomore EP titled Tömesroom: Chapter 1. In 2020, she released her debut album titled BT4W (Bigger Than Four Walls) featuring artists like Wavy The Creator, King promise, Runtown and Zlatan. She also released a new single ‘I Pray’ in 2020 featuring Sean Kingston. Her third EP, Dreams, was released on June 25, 2021; and her sophomore album Löv was released on February 28, 2022.

Töme is also an actress and has appeared in movies like Fear Thy Roommate, Clash and Love in Transition. In 2019, she joined Wizkid on his Canadian tour, performed with Mr Eazi during his 2019 European tour at SSE Arena Wembley, and also appeared at a concert by Burna Boy.

In 2020, she joined 2Baba, Efya, DJ Spinall, and over 30 other African artists at the Hope for Africa virtual concert, a collaboration between MultiChoice and One Africa Global Foundation aimed at cushioning the impact of the COVID-19 pandemic.

== Discography ==
=== Albums ===
- Bigger Than Four Walls (2020)
- Löv (2022)

=== Extended plays ===
- One with Self (2015)
- Tömesroom: Chapter 1 (2019)
- Dreams (2020)

=== Singles ===
- “Up and away” (2015)
- "Existing" (2015)
- "Numbers" (2015)
- "L'amour" (2019)
- "The Money" (2020)
- "Better Than That" (2020)
- "Livin" (2020)
- "i Pray" (2020)
- "Nana" (2021)

== Awards and nominations ==
Year	Award	Category	Nominee/Work	Result	Ref
2020	Juno Awards of 2021	Reggae Recording of the Year	"I Pray"	Won	
