= Leroy "Twist" Casey =

American actor

Leroy Casey
- Born: January 22, 1973 (age 53); The Bronx, New York, U.S.
- Other names: D.J. Twist, Casey Lee
- Occupations: Disk jockey, television, film actor
- Years active: 1991–present
- Website: http://www.actorcaseylee.com

Leroy Casey (born January 22, 1973) is an American actor who served as DJ for the sketch comedy series In Living Color, from 1991 until 1994.

== Career ==
Casey also appeared in the Keenen Ivory Wayans film A Low Down Dirty Shame (1994) as a young police officer, the Wayans Brothers comedy White Chicks (2004) as Tony, along with actor Terry Crews (of the UPN/The CW series Everybody Hates Chris), and in Dance Flick (2009) as the undercover police officer who arrests a student who was freestyling about a murder he committed. Casey, who has been friends with Shawn Wayans since childhood, also appeared with Shawn and Marlon Wayans in a guest appearance in an episode of The WB comedy The Wayans Bros. (he was credited as Casey Lee), UPN's In the House, opposite LL Cool J, and ABC-TV crime drama series NYPD Blue.

In 2010, Casey appeared in an Internet series titled Punanny Diaries, as the character "James".

== Filmography ==
=== Film ===
Year	Title	Role	Notes
1996	Don't Be a Menace to South Central While Drinking Your Juice in the Hood	Birthday Boy Thug	
1997	Most Wanted	Randy	
1997	The Solution	Justice Streets	
1998	Kinfolks	Sean Green	
1999	True Crime	Warren Russell	
1999	The Big Split	Lyle's Brother	
2002	The Trial	Steven	
2004	White Chicks	Tony	
2009	Blue	Dutch	
2009	Dance Flick	Undercover Cop	
2013	How to Commit Fraud	Det. Wright	
2014	Alone	Brandon Wallace	
2020	Blue: The American Dream	Dutch	

=== Television ===
Year	Title	Role	Notes
1997	Malcolm & Eddie	Man	Episode: "The Courtship of Eddie's Mother"
1997	The Wayans Bros.	Terrell Young	Episode: "Odd Man Out"
1998	In the House	Deandre	Episode: "All's Fair in Love and War"
2000	A Private Affair	Boyd	Television film
2001	NYPD Blue	Rashaan	Episode: "Lost Time"
2001	Carmen: A Hip Hopera	Blaze	Television film
2005	My Wife and Kids	Salesman	Episode: "Michael Joins a Gym"
2007	CSI: Miami	Mike Carlton	Episode: "Bang, Bang, Your Debt"
2010	The Punanny Diaries	James	2 episodes
2018	Marlon	Gerard	Episode: "Wingman"
