= Carmen: A Hip Hopera =

2001 television film directed by Robert Townsend

- DVD cover
- Genre: Musical drama Romance
- Based on: Carmen by: Georges Bizet; Ludovic Halévy; Henri Meilhac
- Screenplay by: Michael Elliot
- Directed by: Robert Townsend
- Starring: Mekhi Phifer; Beyoncé Knowles
- Composer: Kip Collins
- Country of origin: United States
- Original language: English

Production
- Producer: Graig Hutchison
- Cinematography: Geary McLeod
- Editor: Jonathan Shaw
- Running time: 88 minutes
- Production companies: Carmen Productions; New Line Television

Original release
- Network: MTV
- Release: May 8, 2001

Carmen: A Hip Hopera is a 2001 American musical romantic drama television film directed by Robert Townsend. Starring Beyoncé Knowles in her debut acting role (predating her theatrical film debut in Austin Powers in Goldmember) along with Mekhi Phifer, Mos Def, Rah Digga, Wyclef Jean, Da Brat, Joy Bryant, Reagan Gomez-Preston (who had previously worked with Townsend on The Parent 'Hood, which ended in 1999), Jermaine Dupri and Lil' Bow Wow, it is based upon the 1875 opera Carmen by Georges Bizet, Ludovic Halévy and Henri Meilhac, but set in modern-day Philadelphia and Los Angeles and featuring a mostly original hip-hop/R&B score in place of Bizet's opera. The film premiered on MTV on May 8, 2001.

The film is the second major African-American adaptation of the opera, the first being the 1943 Broadway musical Carmen Jones and its 1954 Academy Award-nominated film adaptation.

== Plot ==
Seductive aspiring actress Carmen Brown, who unwittingly causes trouble wherever she goes, gets involved with Philadelphia Police Department Sergeant Derek Hill, who is engaged to a cocktail waitress named Caela. At Lou's Bar, Carmen gets into a fight with a jealous woman, and Hill's superior officer, Lieutenant Frank Miller, orders Hill to bring Carmen to jail. Carmen tries unsuccessfully to seduce Hill, but convinces him to let her stop at her apartment to put her mother's ring in a safe place so it does not get stolen in jail. There, she puts on lingerie and wins him over. He is caught in the morning (with Carmen nowhere to be found) by Miller (who is now revealed to be a crooked cop), who brings Caela with him as he arrests Hill. Caela slaps Hill and tells him she hates him.

While in jail, Hill cannot stop thinking about Carmen. She writes him a letter, and he shares his obsession with cellmates Jalil and "Pockets". Meanwhile, Carmen meets the famous rapper Blaze at "the Spot", nightclub. He wants to bring her to Los Angeles, but succeeds only in bringing her best friends. Carmen promises to meet them in LA once Hill is out of jail. Unfortunately, Hill is facing a year of probation once he gets out. However, after he gets into an argument with Miller, he punches him, fleeing to Los Angeles afterwards with Carmen, who is unaware of the incident.

Things in Los Angeles do not go well: Carmen cannot find an acting job, and Hill's fugitive status prevents him from obtaining employment. She encounters her best friends, Rasheeda and Nikki, who are being treated like royalty by Blaze. The trio have their tarot cards read by a psychic; while Rasheeda and Nikki receive favorable fortunes, Carmen's cards read "ruin," "sorrow" and "death." Deciding that it is time for a change, she goes to Blaze's rehearsal and is invited to be his date to his next concert. Meanwhile, Sergeant Tony Porter (Hill's ex-partner) gives Hill and Carmen's address to Miller for a large amount of cash. Simultaneously, a radio, connected to a power outlet, falls into the bathtub which Carmen had just left. Carmen wonders if that was meant to be her death.

Shortly afterwards, Carmen breaks up with Hill and moves in with her friends in a house apparently owned by Blaze. She feels that she should not give up her life for him, even though he did for her. Much like his counterpart in the original opera, Hill is devastated. He also learns from Caela, who still loves him, that he is in danger. Since Hill knows how crooked he is, Miller wants to get rid of him. Hill goes to Carmen to try to win her over again and make her leave with him. Carmen does not want to leave and tells Hill that she is staying. During their argument, a voyeuristic Miller accidentally shoots Carmen twice with a silenced gun while aiming for Hill. As Carmen dies in Hill's arms, he touches her back and sees blood running down his hand, lays the dead body down on the floor and goes to fight Miller. Hill and Miller have their last fight which ends with Miller falling to his death. Rasheeda and Nikki find Carmen's dead body and are both shocked and devastated. The story ends with Hill's wrongful arrest and the rapping narrator laying a rose down for Carmen stating "Immortal Beloved ... Carmen Brown, There'll never be another".

== Cast ==
- Mekhi Phifer as Sergeant Derek Hill / Don José
- Beyoncé Knowles as Carmen Brown / Carmen
- Mos Def as Lieutenant Frank Miller / Zuniga
- Rah Digga as Rasheeda / Frasquita
- Joy Bryant as Nikki / Mercédès
- Wyclef Jean as Fortune Teller
- Da Brat as Rapping Narrator
- Jermaine Dupri as "Pockets" / Le Remendado
- Lil' Bow Wow as Jalil / Le Dancaïre
- Casey Lee as "Blaze" / Escamillo
- Reagan Gomez-Preston as Caela / Micaëla
- Sam Sarpong as Nathaniel
- Troy Winbush as Sergeant Tony Porter / Moralès
- Fred Williamson as Lou / Lillas Pastia

== History ==
Carmen: A Hip Hopera, as a remake, mostly resembles the 1954 version starring Dorothy Dandridge and Harry Belafonte titled Carmen Jones, which itself was a remake of the opera Carmen by Georges Bizet. The film exercised a common role for African-American women known as "Jezebel typecast", which was displayed by sassy, shameless, and often cutthroat women. However, Dandridge was able to play the role while adding layers to her character. Commercially successful, the film also became a paramount in the Black feminist community as this was one of the first movies to successfully show a black woman beyond roles that were oversexualized, as well as break the mold of the common black role of "mammy".

Director Robert Townsend also directed the 1987 stand-up comedy film Eddie Murphy Raw, and directed and starred in both the 1991 musical film The Five Heartbeats and the 1993 superhero comedy film The Meteor Man. There are some discrepancies with how the story differs from its original play version as well as criticism of Beyoncé's movie debut performance. In the book Carmen: From Silent Film to MTV, Perriam and Davies state that "Beyoncé ... is an accomplished, virtuoso singer, and she has difficulty bending her particular talents to spoken delivery". The opposite was said about Mehki Phifer who "has proven himself elsewhere an effective actor for television and film, but he seems to be uncomfortable here either rapping or singing". In the original play and Carmen Jones, Carmen was killed by Don José, the male lead; however, in the Hip Hopera version, while at Blaze's concert, she is killed by Miller and dies in the arms of Hill, the male lead. Also, this was the first widely released musical involving mostly rap. Some similarities between the versions include all-star casts (of notable celebrities of the era) as well as some musical themes relating to the scenes.

== Soundtrack ==
An accompanying soundtrack album entitled MTV's Hip Hopera: Carmen was released by Music World Entertainment and Columbia Records in partnership with MTV on June 12, 2001.

== Critical response ==
The film received mainly mixed reviews. On Rotten Tomatoes, it has an approval rating of 50% from 6 reviews.
