= Find Your Way Back (Beyoncé song) =

Song by Beyoncé

from the album The Lion King: The Gift
- Released: July 19, 2019
- Recorded: 2019
- Studio: Parkwood West (Los Angeles, California)
- Genre: Pop; afropop; afro house
- Length: 2:42
- Label: Parkwood; Columbia
- Songwriters: Beyoncé; Brittany Hazzard; Bubele Booi; Robert Magwenzi; Bankulli; Niniola Apata; Osabuohien Osaretin
- Producers: Beyoncé; Bubele Booi; Magwenzi; Derek Dixie; GuiltyBeatz

"Find Your Way Back" is a song by American singer Beyoncé. It is the fourth track on The Lion King: The Gift (2019), Knowles' curated album released through Parkwood Entertainment and Columbia Records alongside her appearance in the 2019 live-action theatrical adaptation of 1994's The Lion King. A remix by frequent collaborator MeLo-X was released on July 31, 2020 to coincide with the release of the deluxe album edition and film Black Is King.

Upon release, the song debuted in the top 10 of the Billboard World Digital Songs chart alongside the rest of her album contributions, resulting in five top 10 hits. The song remained on the chart for seven weeks. Described by BBC as "light-footed", Rolling Stone lauded the song for "feel-good Afropop production" and Knowles' willingness to allow "the sounds of the continent [to] prevail over her star power."

== Background and composition ==
“Find Your Way Back” was written by Knowles, Hazzard, Booi, Magwenzi, and Osaretin, and originated from a casual session between Booi and Magwenzi in Johannesburg during summer 2018 after the duo "knew they wanted to utilize the bass guitar in a cool way and make something that could 'groove and vibe'." Further discussed in an interview with Entertainment Weekly, Booi sent the song and a few others to the Parkwood Entertainment team [through his Universal Music Publishing Group A&R rep Ari Gelaw] after a brief trip to New York, but didn’t hear back as the weeks went by. He eventually returned to South Africa, assuming the opportunity was “dead in the water" before receiving a phone call from Parkwood.

“[Parkwood Entertainment A&R rep Mariel Gomerez] says to me, ‘Hey, I just wanted to tell you something. My boss likes your music,’...So I’m like, ‘Okay, cool. Who’s your boss?’ And she’s like, ‘I can’t legally say her name.’ So I’m like, ‘Oh, you mean the boss-boss.’ And now I’m freaking out on the inside.” Later, when Booi was visiting friends in Los Angeles and an hour away from boarding a plane, he got another call. “Don’t leave L.A.,” [A representative at] Parkwood told him. They invited him to a camp to focus solely on the project. “That was an incredible moment for me. I can’t even express how ridiculous it was,... It’s a week of meeting and interacting with the coolest people. And during that you create a bunch of things and it gets passed around, and you never really know what’s happening.”

— Bubele Booi in EW article "How emerging South African producer Bubele Booi ended up on Beyoncé's Lion King album" (2019)

The song contains elements of 2017 song "Maradona", written by Sarz and performed by Niniola. Nigerian producer and songwriter Bankulli was responsible for the subtle ode to Yoruba Fuji music, contributing vocals in the bridge. Lyrically, the song alludes to the "Circle of Life" messaging of the film, and acts as a self-reflection about the navigation of one's life: "Find your way back / Big, big world, but you got it, baby / Find your way back, don't let this life drive you crazy / Find your way back, come back home with the street lights on / Find your way back, find your way back." She also reminisces on the lessons taught by her father as a guiding light through life’s travails. The Daily Texan went further, describing the song and fatherhood messaging as a "a spiritual sequel to “Daddy Lessons” from Knowles' 2016 album Lemonade.

== Reception ==
The song was met with acclaim. Hannah Browne of publication The Line of Best Fit described it as "[a] hip-turning highlight", while Ed Power of The Irish Examiner noted "gusto" and "reverence." Christobel Hastings of Stylist opined that the song "has the capacity to transport to another dimension" while "[unexpectedly] rival[ing] her love of [Knowles'] 00s R&B catalog." In a more mixed review, NME mentioned that the "self-help trope" of the song "ramble[s] a bit" when combined with album opener "Bigger", however they also mentioned their singular "power as [standalone] pop tracks", "underpinned by rhythmic Afrobeat-esque production."

== Visual ==
Knowles filmed the music video in the Guadalupe-Nipomo Dunes near Pismo Beach, California. Directed by Knowles, she is featured alongside two dancers wearing masks inspired by the traditional face coverings worn by the Dogon peoples of Mali, as well as an ensemble of dancers covered in sparkling jewels.

== Personnel ==
- Beyoncé Giselle Knowles-Carter – producer, composer, lyricist, lead vocals, backing vocals, vocal producer
- Abisagboola "Bankulli" Oluseun - producer, composer, vocal producer, backing vocals
- Bubele Booi - producer, composer, lyricist
- Robert Magwenzi - producer, composer, lyricist
- Derek Dixie - co-producer, vocal producer
- GuiltyBeatz - co-producer
- Starrah - composer, lyricist
- Osabuohien Osaretin - composer, lyricist
- Niniola - composer, lyricist

== Charts ==
Weekly chart performance for "Find Your Way Back"
Chart (2019)	Peak position
US Hot R&B Songs (Billboard)	25
World Digital Song Sales (Billboard)	5

== Certifications ==
Certifications for "Find Your Way Back"
Region	Certification	Certified units/sales
Brazil (Pro-Música Brasil)	Gold	30,000^{‡}
^{‡} Sales+streaming figures based on certification alone.

== Release history ==
"Standing on the Sun" release history
Region	Date	Format(s)	Version	Label(s)	Ref.
Various	July 19, 2019	Digital download; streaming	original Version	Parkwood; Columbia	
Various	July 31, 2020	Digital download; streaming	MeLo-X Remix version	Parkwood; Columbia	
