= Cherdericka Nichols =

American singer, songwriter, producer, mixing engineer

- Born: Cherdericka Yvonne Nichols Detroit, Michigan, United States
- Genres: R&B; alternative rock; dance
- Occupations: Singer; songwriter; producer; mixing engineer; poet
- Label: Cher Cat Records
- Website: www.cherdericka.com

Cherdericka Nichols (sha-dare-rick-UH) is an American singer, songwriter, and poet, best known for her contributions to Beyoncé album Renaissance. In May 2023, she released single "Hold Me Down" to acclaim.

== Career ==
=== Early life ===
Nichols grew up in Detroit and credits her grandfather for her love of music. Inspired by Santigold, Wes Anderson, Spike Lee, and Betty Davis, she moved to Los Angeles and entered the entertainment industry as a writer, working on acclaimed short film The 5th Room. In 2020, she released poetry work Black Woman & a Few Things.

=== Music career ===
In 2022, Nichols released alternative-rock debut single "Gimme More", which was crafted from a beat created by Nichols two years prior during the COVID-19 pandemic and her pregnancy. Her music caught the attention of Parkwood Entertainment, who invited her to sessions for what would become Beyonce's seventh studio album Renaissance. Nichols would contribute to standout tracks "Thique" and "All Up In Your Mind", which charted along with the entire album on the Billboard Hot 100 chart. Nichols subsequently received an Album of The Year Grammy nomination at the 2023 ceremony.

This was followed in 2024 by acclaimed single "Hold Me Down".

== Discography ==
=== Singles ===
- 2022: Gimme More
- 2023: Do It To Ya
- 2024: Hold Me Down!
- 2025: FR'EAK

=== Selected songwriting & production credits ===
Title	Year	Artist	Album
"Thique"	2022	Beyoncé	Renaissance
"All Up In Your Mind"	2022	Beyoncé	Renaissance

=== Selected mixing credits ===
Title	Year	Artist	Album
"Say Less" (Featuring Lil Durk & A Boogie wit da Hoodie)	2023	Swizz Beatz	Hip Hop 50, Vol. 2

== Awards and nominations ==
Year	Ceremony	Award	Result	Ref
2023	65th Annual Grammy Awards	Album of the Year (Renaissance)	Nominated	
