= Cadillac Records: Music from the Motion Picture =

Soundtrack album by various artists
- Released: December 2, 2008
- Label: Columbia Records
- Producer: various artists

Singles from Cadillac Records: Music from the Motion Picture
- 1. "At Last" Released: November 3, 2008; 2. "Bridging the Gap" Released: October 5, 2004

Cadillac Records: Music from the Motion Picture is a soundtrack album for the film Cadillac Records. It features covers of classic songs from Chess Records' singers as performed by the film's actors including Beyoncé (as Etta James), Eamonn Walker (as Howlin' Wolf) and Jeffrey Wright (as Muddy Waters). It also features original songs from contemporary artists such as Beyoncé's sister, R&B singer Solange Knowles and rapper Nas. The soundtrack has been released in single and double-disc editions.

At the Inauguration for President Barack Obama in 2009, Beyoncé sang "At Last" for The President and First Lady's first dance of the night during the Neighborhood Inaugural Ball. Held at Washington Convention Center on January 20, 2009, the inaugural event was televised live on ABC for the two-hour prime-time special titled "The Neighborhood Ball: An Inauguration Celebration".

The soundtrack was nominated for a 2010 Grammy Award for Best Compilation Soundtrack Album for a Motion Picture, Television or Other Visual Media. It lost out to the soundtrack from Slumdog Millionaire. Additionally, Beyoncé's "At Last", released as the only single from the soundtrack, won a Grammy for the Best Traditional R&B Vocal Performance. Another one of the songs from the soundtrack, "Once In a Lifetime", also by Beyoncé, was nominated for a Grammy for Best Song Written for a Motion Picture, Television or Other Visual Media but lost to "Jai Ho" from Slumdog Millionaire.It was also nominated for Best Original Song at the 2008 Golden Globe Awards. Knowles' co-writers for the song were Amanda Ghost, Scott McFarnon, Ian Dench, James Dring and Jody Street. At the Golden Globes, "Once In a Lifetime" lost out to Bruce Springsteen's title track for the movie The Wrestler. The soundtrack spent 48 weeks at number one on the Top Blues Albums and it has sold over 165,000 copies in the US.

== Track listing ==
Standard edition (CD, LP and Digital download)
| No. | Title | Writer(s) | Producer(s) | Length |
|---|---|---|---|---|
| 1. | "I'm a Man" (Jeffrey Wright) | Ellas McDaniel | Steve Jordan | 3:51 |
| 2. | "At Last" (Beyoncé) | Mack Gordon; Harry Warren | Jordan | 2:59 |
| 3. | "No Particular Place to Go" (Mos Def) | Chuck Berry | Jordan | 2:47 |
| 4. | "I'm Your Hoochie Coochie Man" (Jeffrey Wright) | Willie Dixon | Jordan | 3:53 |
| 5. | "Once in a Lifetime" (Beyoncé) | Beyoncé Knowles; Amanda Ghost; Scott McFarnon; Ian Dench; James Dring; Jody Street | Ghost; Dench; Knowles | 3:59 |
| 6. | "Let's Take a Walk" (Raphael Saadiq) | Raphael Saadiq; Greg Curtis | Saadiq | 2:28 |
| 7. | "6 O'Clock Blues" (Solange) | Solange Knowles; Lamont Dozier; Mark Ronson; Bosco Mann; Neal Sugarman; Homer Steinweiss; Thomas Brenneck | Ronson | 3:37 |
| 8. | "Nadine" (Mos Def) | Chuck Berry | Jordan | 2:50 |
| 9. | "The Sound" (Mary Mary) | Warryn Campbell; Tina Campbell; Erica Campbell | Warryn Campbell | 3:28 |
| 10. | "Last Night" (Little Walter) | Walter Jacobs | | 2:53 |
| 11. | "I'd Rather Go Blind" (Beyoncé) | Billy Foster; Ellington Jordan | Jordan | 3:10 |
| 12. | "My Babe" (Columbus Short) | Willie Dixon | Jordan | 2:57 |
| 13. | "Bridging the Gap" (Nas featuring Olu Dara) | Nasir Jones; Olu Dara; Salaam Gibbs | Gibbs | 4:00 |

Deluxe edition bonus CD
| No. | Title | Writer(s) | Producer(s) | Length |
|---|---|---|---|---|
| 1. | "Maybellene" (Mos Def) | Chuck Berry | Jordan | 2:31 |
| 2. | "Forty Days and Forty Nights" (Buddy Guy) | Bernard Roth | Jordan | 2:48 |
| 3. | "Trust in Me" (Beyoncé) | Milton Ager; Jean Schwartz; Ned Weaver | Jordan | 3:44 |
| 4. | "Juke" (Soul Seven and Kim Wilson) | Walter Jacobs | Jordan | 2:49 |
| 5. | "Smokestack Lightnin'" (Eamonn Walker) | Chester Burnett | Jordan | 3:04 |
| 6. | "Promised Land" (Mos Def) | Chuck Berry | Jordan | 2:31 |
| 7. | "All I Could Do Was Cry" (Beyoncé) | Berry Gordy; Roquel Davis; Gwen Gordy Fuqua | Jordan | 3:10 |
| 8. | "My Babe" (Elvis Presley) | Willie Dixon | | 2:10 |
| 9. | "I Can't Be Satisfied" (Jeffrey Wright) | McKinley Morganfield | Jordan | 2:19 |
| 10. | "Come On" (Mos Def) | Chuck Berry | Jordan | 2:34 |
| 11. | "Country Blues" (Jeffrey Wright and Bill Sims) | Robert Leroy Johnson; McKinley Morganfield | | 3:42 |
| 12. | "Evolution of a Man" (Q-Tip and Al Kapone) | Ellas McDaniel; A. Bailey; Steve Jordan | Jordan; Al Kapone | 3:07 |
| 13. | "Radio Station" (Terence Blanchard) | Terence Blanchard | | 2:07 |

== Personnel ==
*Taken from Discogs.

- Executive Producer - Mathew Knowles, Marshall Chess, Beth Amy Rosenblatt
- Producer [Soundtrack] - Steve Jordan
- A&R - Max Gousse
- A&R [Operations] - Juli Knapp
- Music Consultant - Steve Berkowitz
- Design - Denise Trotman
- Marketing - Quincy S. Jackson

== Chart performance ==
=== Weekly charts ===
| Chart (2008–09) | Peak position |
|---|---|
| US Billboard 200 | 66 |
| US Top Blues Albums (Billboard) | 1 |
| US Top R&B/Hip-Hop Albums (Billboard) | 11 |
| US Soundtrack Albums (Billboard) | 6 |

=== Year-end charts ===
| Chart (2009) | Position |
|---|---|
| US Top Blues Albums (Billboard) | 1 |
| US Top R&B/Hip-Hop Albums (Billboard) | 68 |
| US Soundtrack Albums (Billboard) | 17 |

| Chart (2010) | Position |
|---|---|
| US Top Blues Albums (Billboard) | 6 |
