= STS-117 =

2007 American crewed spaceflight to the ISS

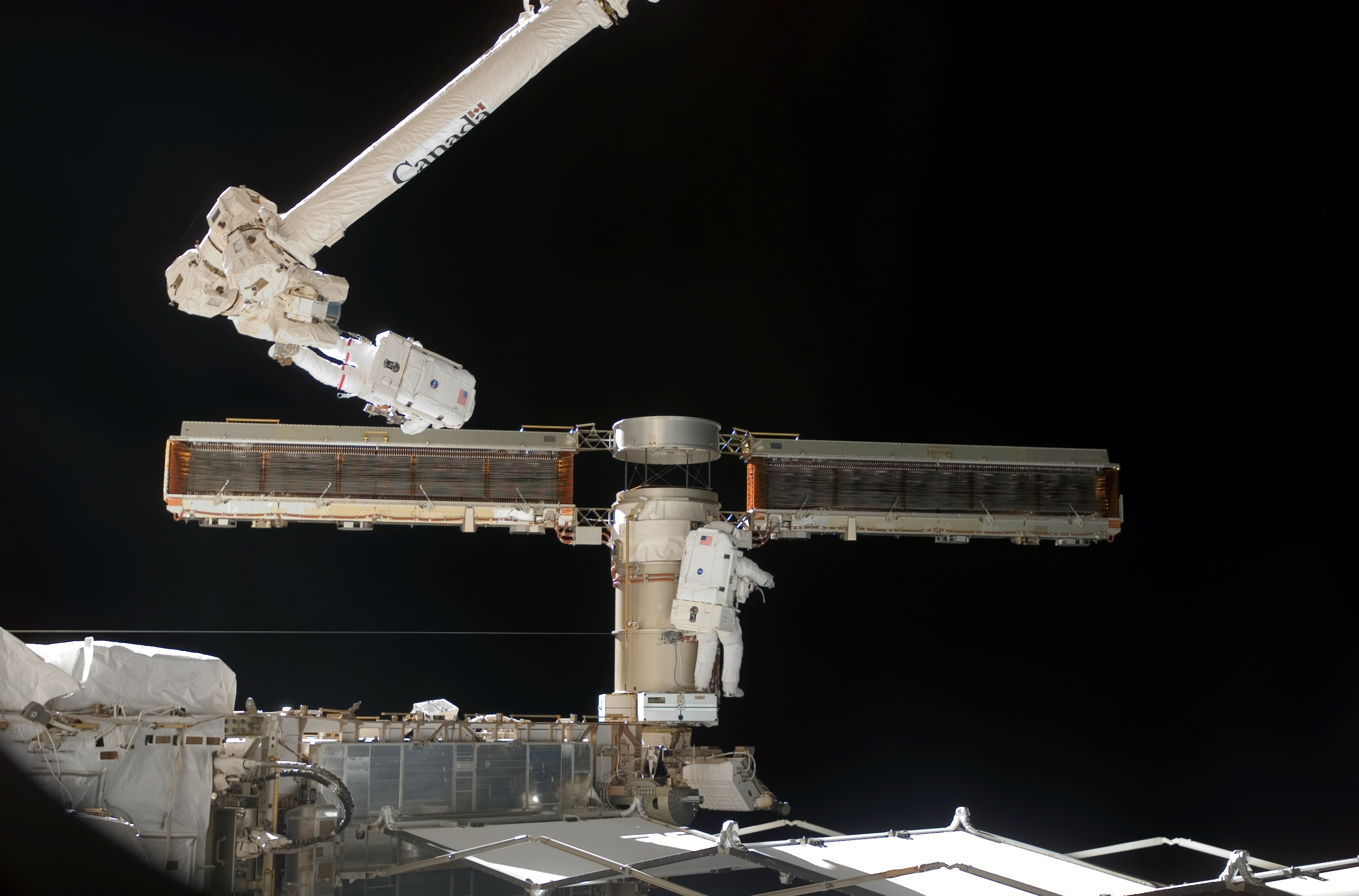
- Reilly (left) and Olivas (center) during EVA 3, preparing the folded P6 truss for its relocation
- Names: Space Transportation System-117
- Mission type: ISS assembly
- Operator: NASA
- COSPAR ID: 2007-024A
- SATCAT no.: 31600
- Mission duration: 13 days, 20 hours, 12 minutes, 44 seconds
- Distance travelled: 9,300,000 kilometres (5,800,000 mi) (9,334,000 km)
- Orbits completed: 219

Spacecraft properties
- Spacecraft: Space Shuttle Atlantis
- Launch mass: 2,052,719 kilograms (4,525,471 lb) (total); 122,683 kilograms (270,469 lb) (orbiter)
- Landing mass: 90,492 kilograms (199,501 lb)

Crew
- Crew size: 7
- Members: Frederick W. Sturckow; Lee J. Archambault; Patrick G. Forrester; Steven R. Swanson; John D. Olivas; James F. Reilly
- Launching: Clayton Anderson
- Landing: Sunita Williams

Start of mission
- Launch date: June 8, 2007, 23:38:04 UTC
- Launch site: Kennedy, LC-39A

End of mission
- Landing date: June 22, 2007, 19:49:38 UTC
- Landing site: Edwards, Runway 22

Orbital parameters
- Reference system: Geocentric
- Regime: Low Earth
- Perigee altitude: 334 kilometres (208 mi)
- Apogee altitude: 354 kilometres (220 mi)
- Inclination: 51.6 degrees
- Period: 91.4 minutes

Docking with ISS
- Docking port: PMA-2 (Destiny forward)
- Docking date: June 10, 2007, 19:36 UTC
- Undocking date: June 19, 2007, 14:42 UTC
- Time docked: 8 days, 19 hours, 6 minutes
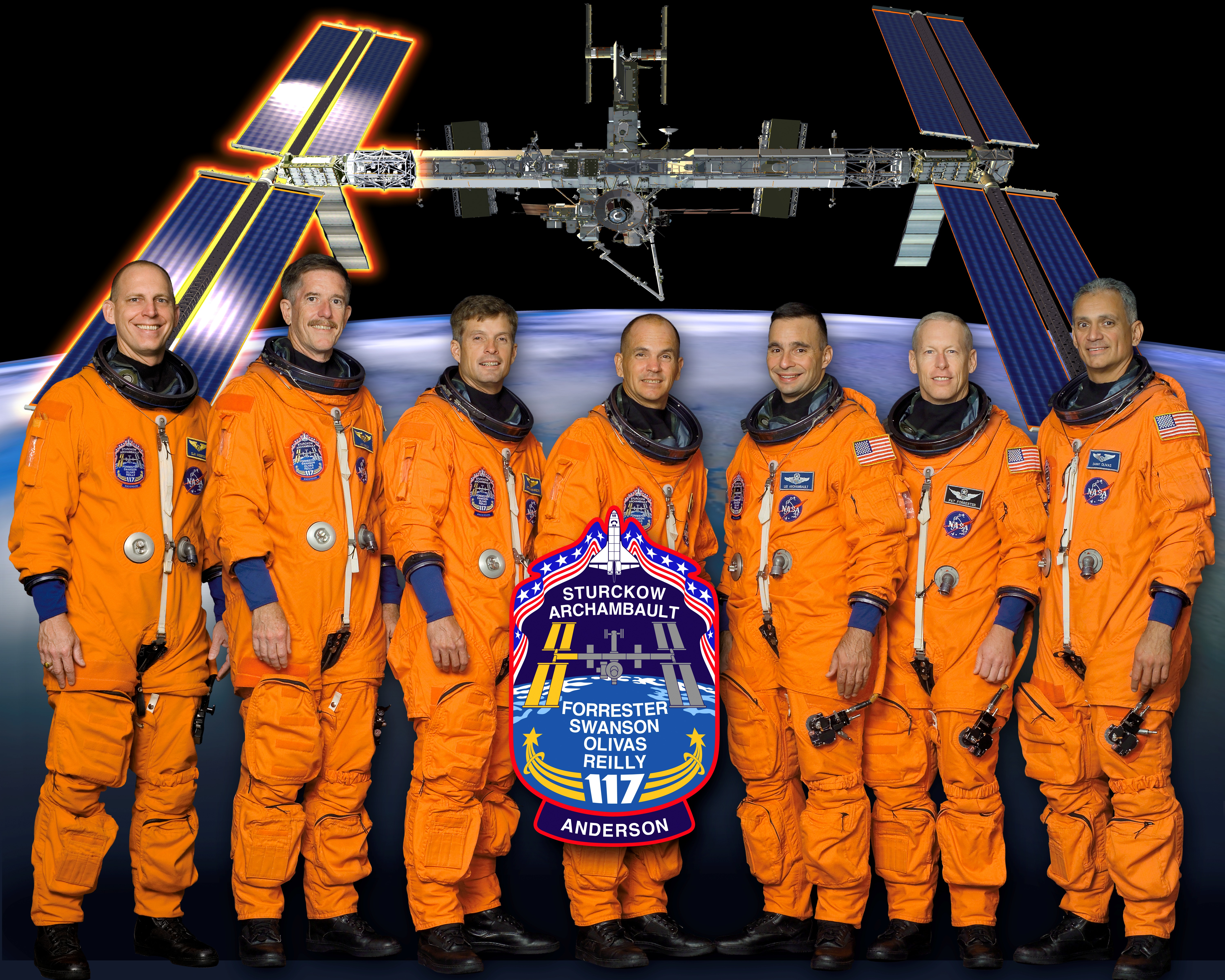
- (left to right) Anderson, Reilly, Swanson, Sturckow, Archambault, Forrester and Olivas. Space Shuttle program

STS-117 (ISS assembly flight 13A) was a Space Shuttle mission flown by Space Shuttle Atlantis, launched from pad 39A of the Kennedy Space Center on June 8, 2007. Atlantis lifted off from the launch pad at 19:38 EDT. Damage from a hail storm on February 26, 2007, had previously caused the launch to be postponed from an originally-planned launch date of March 15, 2007. The launch of STS-117 marked the 250th orbital human spaceflight. It was also the heaviest flight of the Space Shuttle.

Atlantis delivered to the International Space Station (ISS) the second starboard truss segment (the S3/S4 Truss) and its associated energy systems, including a set of solar arrays. During the course of the mission the crew installed the new truss segment, retracted one set of solar arrays, and unfolded the new set on the starboard side of the station. STS-117 also brought Expedition 15 crewmember Clayton Anderson to the station, and returned with ISS crewmember Sunita Williams.

On June 11, 2007, NASA mission managers announced a two-day extension of the mission, adding a fourth extra-vehicular activity (EVA). These two days were inserted into the mission timeline after flight day 8. This possibility had been discussed prior to launch. Because of launch day and thus rendezvous day uncertainty the decision to extend was deferred until after launch. The repair of the gap in the Orbital Maneuvering System (OMS) thermal blanket (heat shielding) was conducted during EVA 3.

STS-117 remains the longest mission for Atlantis because of the cancellation of landing opportunities on June 21, 2007, due to bad weather. Atlantis landed at Edwards Air Force Base on June 22, 2007.

== Crew ==
Position	Launching Astronaut	Landing Astronaut
Commander	Frederick W. Sturckow; Third spaceflight	
Pilot	Lee J. Archambault; First spaceflight	
Mission Specialist 1	Patrick G. Forrester; Second spaceflight	
Mission Specialist 2 Flight Engineer	Steven R. Swanson; First spaceflight	
Mission Specialist 3	John D. Olivas; First spaceflight	
Mission Specialist 4	James F. Reilly; Third and last spaceflight	
Mission Specialist 5	Clayton Anderson; First spaceflight ISS Flight Engineer	Sunita "Suni" Williams; First spaceflight ISS Flight Engineer

=== Crew Notes ===
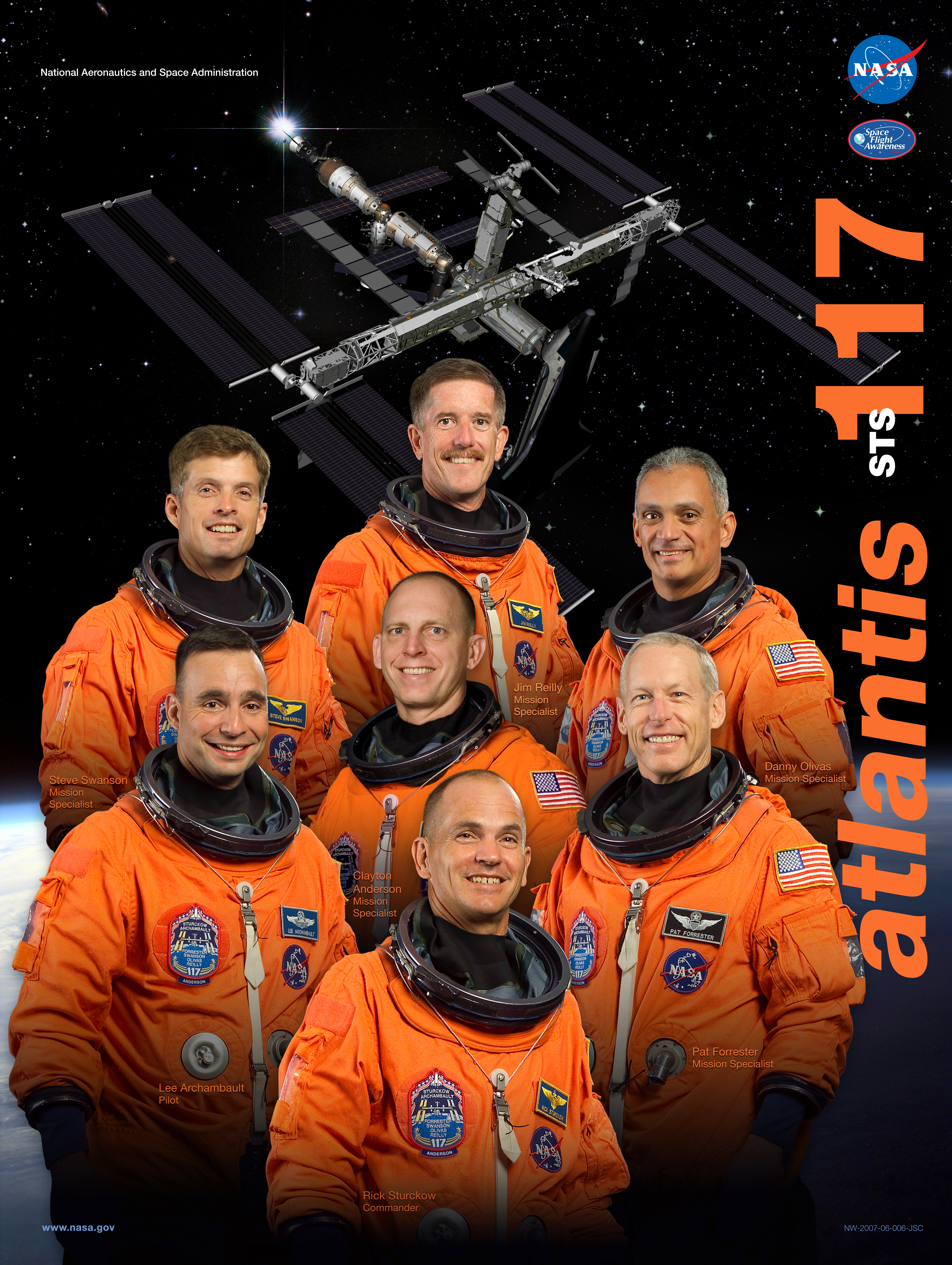
Mission poster

The initial crew manifest before the Columbia accident was:

Position	Astronaut
Commander	Frederick W. Sturckow; Third spaceflight
Pilot	Mark Polansky; Second spaceflight
Mission Specialist 1	Patrick G. Forrester; Second spaceflight
Mission Specialist 2 Flight Engineer	Richard Mastracchio; Second spaceflight
Mission Specialist 3	Joan Higginbotham; First spaceflight
Mission Specialist 4	James F. Reilly; Third spaceflight
Astronaut Mark Polansky was originally slated to pilot this mission, but was moved to STS-116, which he commanded. Also assigned to the flight were Joan Higginbotham and Richard Mastracchio, who were moved to missions STS-116 and STS-118 respectively.

== Mission payload ==
Location	Cargo	Mass
Bay 1–2	Orbiter Docking System EMU 1–2	1,800 kilograms (4,000 lb)? 240 kilograms (530 lb)?
Bay 3P?	APCU (Assembly Power Converter Unit) (28VDC-to-124VDC) with SPDU (Station Power Distribution Unit)	2 x 35 kilograms (77 lb) 20 kilograms (44 lb)
Bay 4–12	Truss segment S3/S4	16,183 kilograms (35,677 lb)
Starboard Sill	OBSS 201	450 kilograms (990 lb)?
Port Sill	RMS 301	390 kilograms (860 lb)
	Total:	19,083 kilograms (42,071 lb)

=== S3/S4 truss segments ===
For comprehensive description of the S3/S4 truss segment and more information, also see

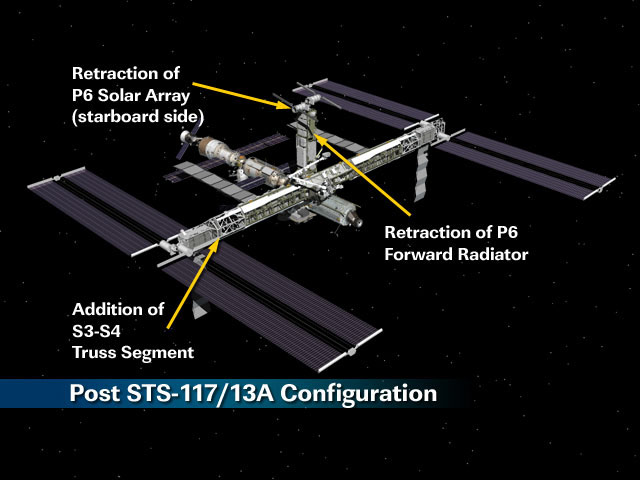
Post STS-117 station configuration with the newly installed S3/S4 truss segment.

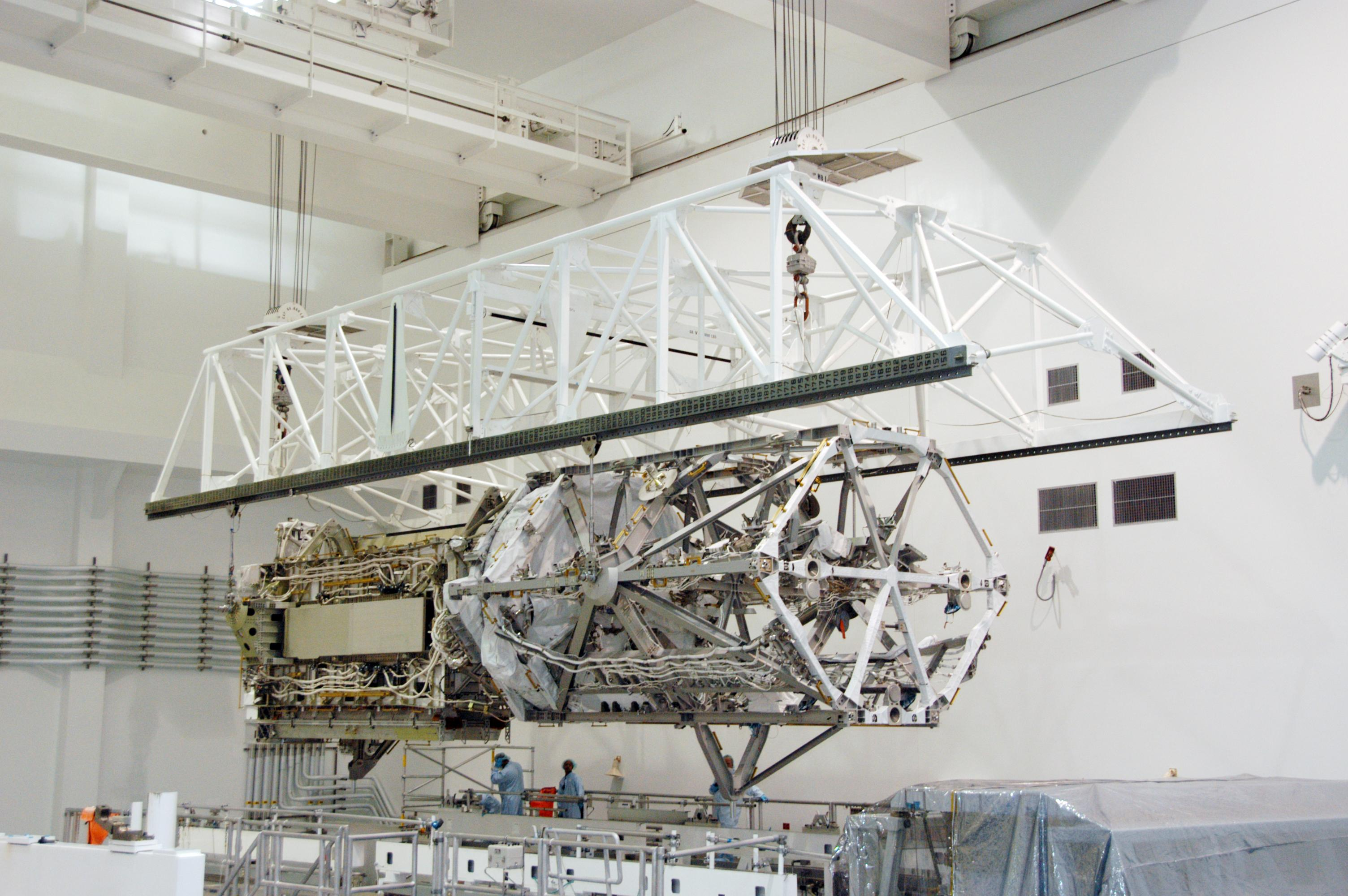
An overhead crane lifts the completed S3/S4 truss inside the Space Station Processing Facility

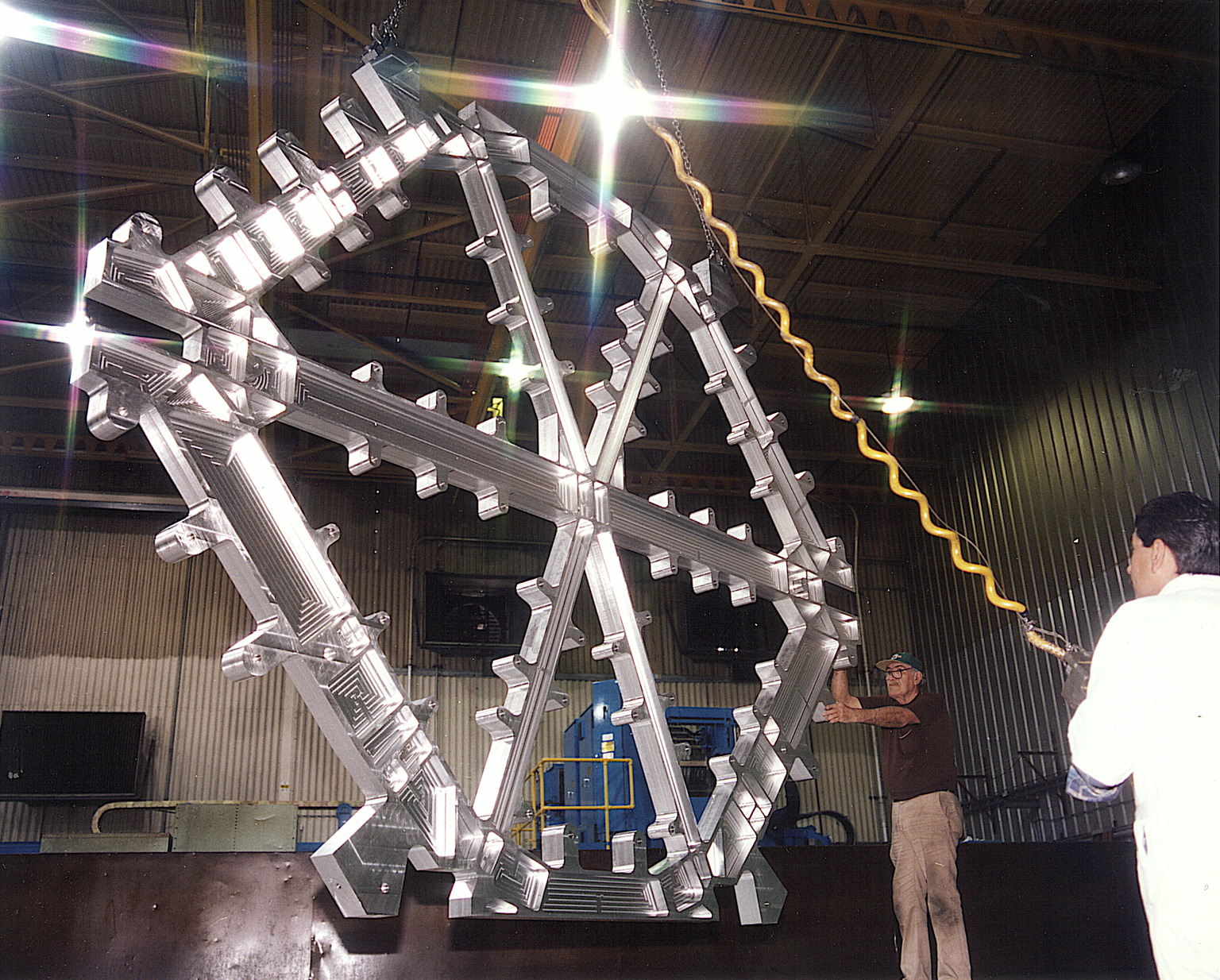
S3 truss section being hoisted by overhead cranes after milling at NASA's Michoud Assembly Facility

The STS-117 mission delivered the second starboard truss segment (S3/S4) and associated energy systems to the International Space Station (ISS). Manufactured by the Boeing Company at the Michoud Assembly Facility, S3/S4 is the heaviest station payload the shuttle has ever carried. The main functions of the S3/S4 truss segments are to provide electrical power and data interfaces for station's electronics and convert sunlight to electricity. They also provide active thermal protection to electrical components throughout the space station and allow the connection of platforms to store spare parts. S3/S4 segments were the second starboard addition to the ISS truss structure after the S1 truss was attached during Atlantis' STS-112 mission.

Both S3/S4 were handed off to NASA in September 2002. S3/S3 measures 44 feet 9.6 inches (13.655 meters) long by 16 feet 3.4 inches (4.963 meters) wide by 15 feet 2.3 inches (4.630 meters) high and weighs 35,678 lbs (16,183 kilograms). It is made from stainless steel.

During flight day 4 activities, the S3/S4 truss segment was removed from the payload bay of Atlantis using the shuttle's robotic arm and handed off to the station's Canadarm2, where it was maneuvered and mated to the outboard end of the S1 truss.

==== Starboard 3 ====
The S3 primary structure is made of a hexagonal-shaped stainless steel structure and includes four bulkheads and six longerons, beams that connect the bulkheads. The secondary structure includes brackets, fittings, attach platforms, EVA activity equipment and miscellaneous mechanisms. S3 was delivered to the Space Station Processing Facility at Kennedy Space Center on December 7, 2000.

The major S3 subsystems include the Solar Array Rotary Joint (SARJ) – which contains large bearings, Segment-to-Segment Attach System (SSAS) and Payload Attach System (PAS). The SARJ continuously rotates to keep the Solar Array Wings (SAWs) on S4 and S6 (launched on shuttle mission STS‐119 in March 2009) oriented toward the sun as the ISS orbits the Earth. The S3 also provides a passive attachment point to the S1 segment via the SSAS. The PAS allows platforms to be attached to S3 for the storage of additional science payloads or spare Orbital Replacement units (ORUs).

==== Starboard 4 ====
Major subsystems of the S4 truss are the port inboard Photovoltaic Module (PVM), the Photovoltaic Radiator (PVR), the Alpha Joint Interface Structure (AJIS) and the Modified Rocketdyne Truss Attachment System (MRTAS). The primary functions of the PVMs are to collect, convert, store and distribute electrical power to loads within the segment and to other station segments. There are two SAWs on the S4 each deployed in the opposite direction from each other. Each SAW is made up of two solar blankets mounted to a common mast (made from shape memory alloy) and measures 115 by 38 feet (35 by 12 m). In addition to the SARJ, the SAWs also are oriented by the Beta Gimbal Assembly (BGA), which can change the pitch of the wings by spinning the solar array. The PVR is deployable on orbit and is capable of dissipating up to 14 kW of heat into space. The PVR weighs 1,633 pounds and when deployed measures 44 by 12 by 7 feet (2.1 m). The AJIS provides the structural transition between S3 and S4 structures. S4 contains the passive side of the MRTAS which provides the structural attachment for S5 on S4.

S4 was delivered to the Space Station Processing Facility at Kennedy Space Center on January 15, 2001.

=== Hydrogen Vent Valve ===
Atlantis carried a Hydrogen Vent Valve in its mid-deck to the space station. The valve used to vent Hydrogen overboard is part of the oxygen generating system (OGS). The OGS helps to produce oxygen for the crew to replace oxygen lost due to experiment use, airlock depressurization and venting.

=== Other items ===
Other items carried on the mid-deck included a contingency water container for transferring water to the ISS, a tool "modified torque multiplier" for removing S3 launch restraints and audio interface hardware to troubleshoot shuttle-to-station communication difficulties experienced during STS-115 and STS-116. The payload weight for the mid-deck during STS-117 was less than 1,000 pounds.

Among numerous cargo, Atlantis carried into space an almost 400-year-old artifact (a metal cargo tag) etched with the name of its destination "Yames Towne" from historic Jamestown, Virginia, along with four commemorative coins to honor early American explorers. A 17th-century metal worker had prepared a tag to mark cargo heading for the New World. The tag was unearthed in 2006 at Jamestown, the location of the first permanent English settlement in the Americas in 1607.

A comprehensive list of STS-132 items that will be carried aboard Atlantis and their descriptions can be found in the Official Flight Kit.

=== Crew seat assignments ===
Seat	Launch	Landing	Seats 1–4 are on the flight deck. Seats 5–7 are on the mid-deck.
1	Sturckow		Seats 1–4 are on the flight deck. Seats 5–7 are on the mid-deck.
2	Archambault		Seats 1–4 are on the flight deck. Seats 5–7 are on the mid-deck.
3	Forrester		Seats 1–4 are on the flight deck. Seats 5–7 are on the mid-deck.
4	Swanson		Seats 1–4 are on the flight deck. Seats 5–7 are on the mid-deck.
5	Olivas		Seats 1–4 are on the flight deck. Seats 5–7 are on the mid-deck.
6	Reilly		Seats 1–4 are on the flight deck. Seats 5–7 are on the mid-deck.
7	Anderson	Williams	Seats 1–4 are on the flight deck. Seats 5–7 are on the mid-deck.

== Mission background ==
The mission marks:

- 149th crewed US space flight
- 118th shuttle mission since STS-1
- 28th flight of Atlantis
- 21st shuttle mission to the ISS
- 1st shuttle flight in 2007
- 93rd post-Challenger mission
- 5th post-Columbia mission

== Shuttle processing ==
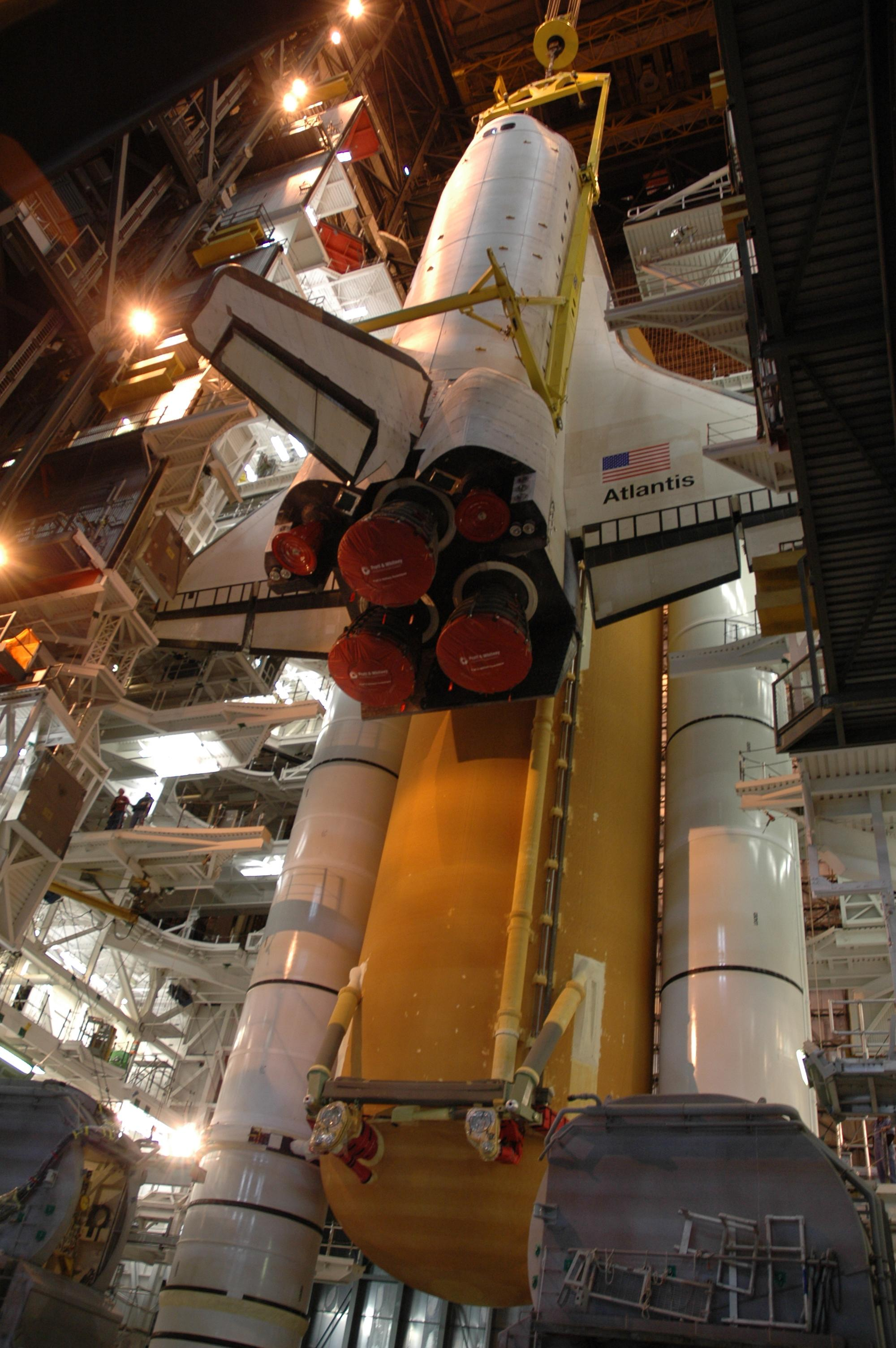
Atlantis is mated to the rest of the STS-117 stack.

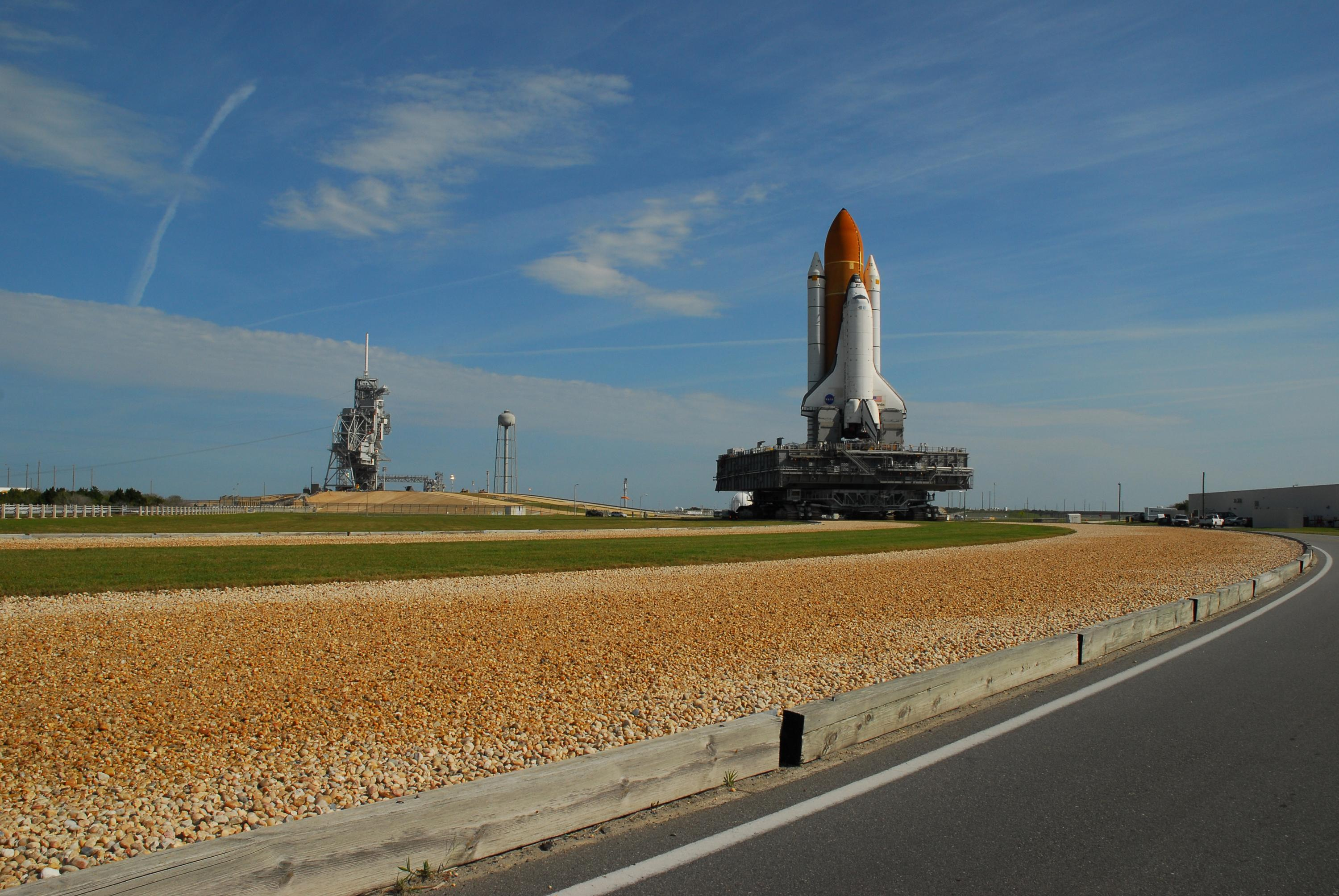
Atlantis being rolled back to the VAB for repairs on March 4, 2007, following hailstorm damage.

STS-117 was originally planned to launch on March 16, but the launch date was later moved forward in order to extend the launch window and increase the chances of a successful launch within that time frame. In preparation for this earlier launch date, Atlantis was transported to the Vehicle Assembly Building on February 7, 2007. First motion was at 06:19 EST.

Following the arrival of the shuttle in the assembly facility, Atlantis was fitted with two bridge cranes that lifted her vertically, to position her for mating to the external fuel tank and solid rocket boosters, already in place atop the mobile launcher platform. The mating of the Orbiter to the stack occurred on February 12, 2007. The rest of the pre-launch preparations also continued to proceed according to plans, with the payload canister, containing the S3/S4 Truss and a set of solar arrays, arriving at the launch pad at 02:54 EST on February 12, 2007. The canister lift began at 05:40 EST the same morning, ready for transfer of the ISS truss segments and other cargo into the Payload Changeout Room on the newly refurbished rotating service structure of pad 39A.

Atlantis was originally scheduled to begin her rollout to launch pad 39A (the first shuttle launch at 39A in four years) on February 14, 2007, however due to erratic chamber pressure readings on one of the Operational Pressure Transducers (OPTs) on the forward skirt area of the right-hand SRB, the rollout was delayed to 07:00 EST on the morning of February 15, 2007. Various problems, including a generator transfer issue to the mobile launcher platform, meant that first movement of the stack was delayed from the scheduled rollout time and did not occur until 08:19 EST. The 3.4-mile (5.5 km), six-hour journey to the launchpad concluded that afternoon, with Atlantis arriving at the launch pad at 15:09 EST. It was decided that the issue with the OPT would be solved on the launch pad, a task which may require all six transducers on the STS-117 stack being removed and replaced.

On February 21, 2007, the STS-117 crew traveled from Houston to the Kennedy Space Center (KSC) to participate in the Terminal Countdown Demonstration Test (TCDT). The astronauts were at KSC from February 21 to 23, 2007, during which time they practiced launch activities, carried out safety exercises, inspected the payload and concluded the test with a simulated main engine cut-off exercise. They then returned to Houston via T-38 jets, planning to return to KSC a few days before launch. The next milestone in the launch preparations was the Flight Readiness Review from February 27 to 28, 2007, during which time managers, engineers and contractors examined the readiness of the Space Shuttle, flight crew and payloads to determine whether everything was set to proceed for launch.

=== Hail damage ===
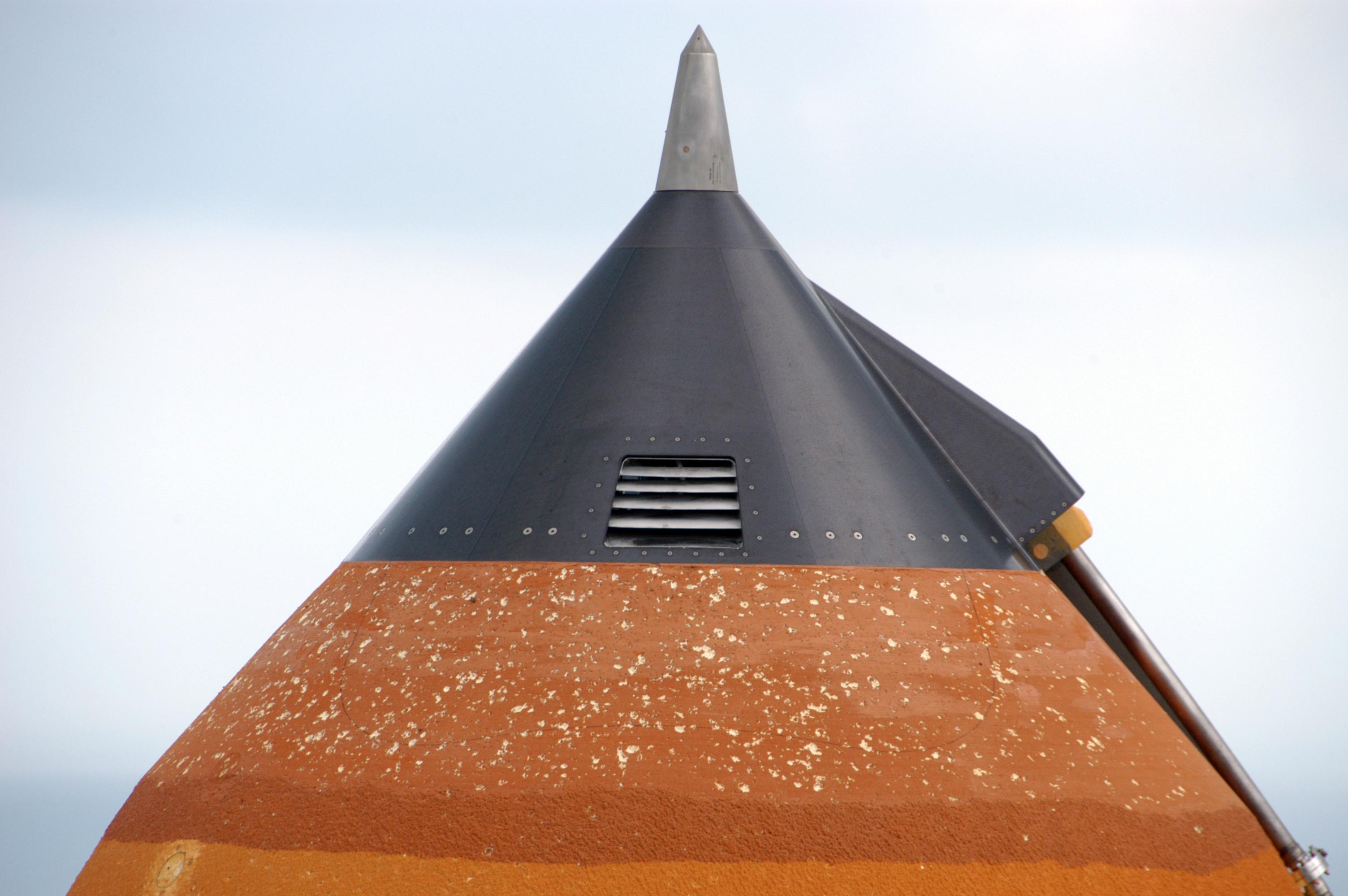
External tank (ET)-124 shows hailstorm damage.

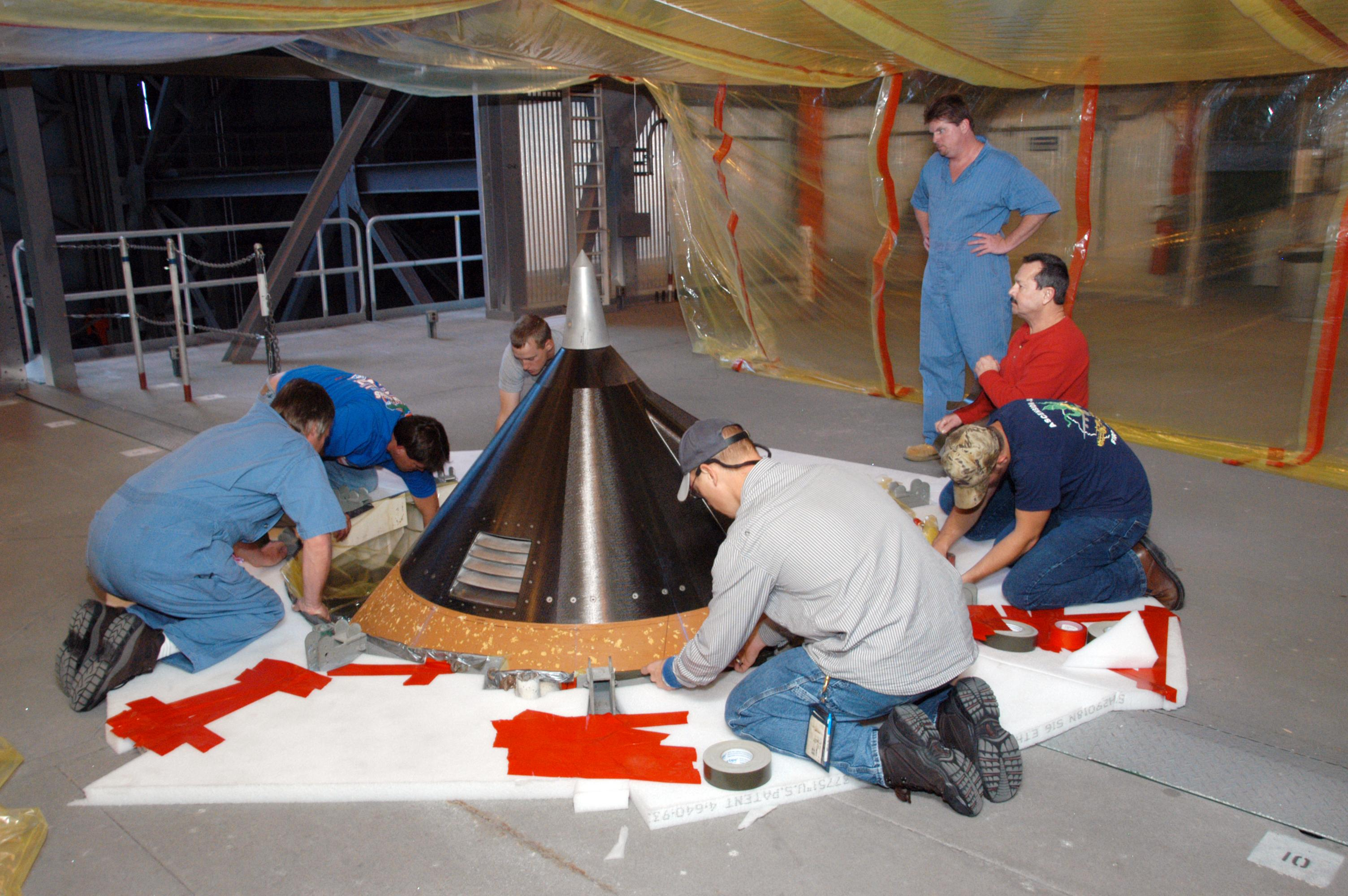
Technicians repair the ET nose cone.

Following a hailstorm at KSC on February 26, 2007, inspections of the stack found damage to the shuttle and the external tank. Hailstones as large as golf balls had created around 1,000–2,000 divots in the tank's foam insulation, damaged at least one Ice Frost Ramp on the tank, and caused minor surface damage to about 26 heat shield tiles on Atlantis's left wing.

On March 4, 2007, the STS-117 stack was similarly rolled back into the VAB. Following additional inspections, repairs to the orbiter and tank were carried out to return Atlantis to flight readiness. After completion of the repairs, Atlantis (along with her distinctly speckled external tank) was rolled out to pad 39A for the second time during the morning of May 15, 2007. A second Flight Readiness Review took place on May 30–31, 2007.

The hail damage to Atlantis caused major changes to the shuttle launch manifest at that time, pushing STS-118 back to August 8, 2007 (which could not have flown until the installation of the S3/S4 truss segment carried by Atlantis was completed), STS-120 back to October 23, 2007, and Atlantis's return on STS-122 back to a targeted launch date on December 6, 2007. Atlantis on STS-122 eventually lifted off on February 7, 2008.

=== Aging problem ===
NASA announced that it is possible, albeit unlikely, that one of 24 Composite Overwrap Pressure Vessels onboard Atlantis could burst before launch, damaging the orbiter. A burst of a vessel during launch could have resulted in the loss of the shuttle and crew. NASA changed the launch procedure for Atlantis to counter this problem and reduce any risk to personnel and the shuttle.

== Mission timeline ==
=== June 8 (Flight day 1 – Launch) ===
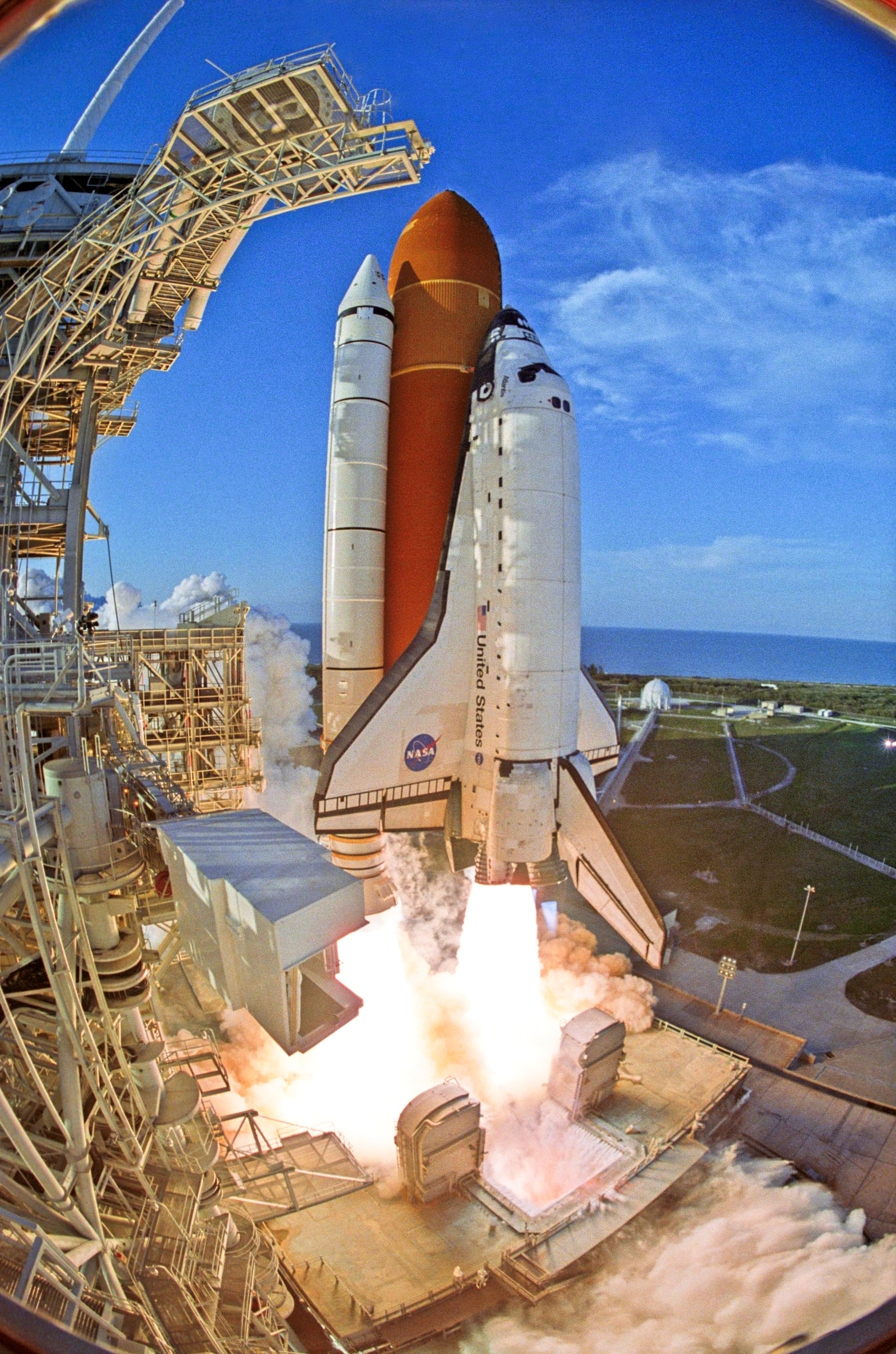
Space Shuttle Atlantis launches at the beginning of STS-117.

Launch video

Atlantis was launched on schedule at 23:38:04 UTC from launch pad 39A at the KSC with NASA launch commentator George Diller's words upon launch being "and Liftoff of Space Shuttle Atlantis, to assemble the framework for the science laboratories of tomorrow!". STS-117 was the first launch from launch pad 39A since the fateful STS-107 launch of Space Shuttle Columbia in 2003.

All pre-launch processing proceeded normally, and the crew started to board Atlantis at 16:17 EDT (20:17 UTC). Crew boarding was completed at 20:58 UTC, and the hatch was closed at around 21:40 UTC. Weather was 80% go to support the launch. There were concerns about the weather at TAL abort landing sites, but Istres in France changed to go in time for the launch. The conditions at the other available site, Zaragoza, were observed to be improving. The third TAL site, Morón AFB, was closed for runway maintenance until June 15, 2007.

Atlantis's eight-and-a-half-minute ride to orbit was mostly uneventful with only one small piece of debris spotted just after solid rocket booster separation two minutes and five seconds after the launch. Shuttle Program Manager, Wayne Hale said a preliminary analysis of launch video "indicates the debris didn't strike the orbiter".

As Atlantis launched, the space station flew 220 miles (350 km) above the southern Indian Ocean, southwest of Australia. Aboard the ISS, cosmonauts Fyodor Yurchikhin, Oleg Kotov and NASA astronaut Sunita Williams watched the launch of Atlantis on a video feed provided by flight controllers in Houston.

After reaching orbit, Atlantis' crew began procedures to open the shuttle's payload bay doors and set up computers and other equipment. They also powered up the shuttle's robotic arm to check its operation. Photos taken during the robotic arm checkout showed a 4-inch by 6-inch corner area of insulation blanket on the shuttle's port orbital maneuvering system (OMS) pod pulled away from an adjacent row of heat-shield tiles.

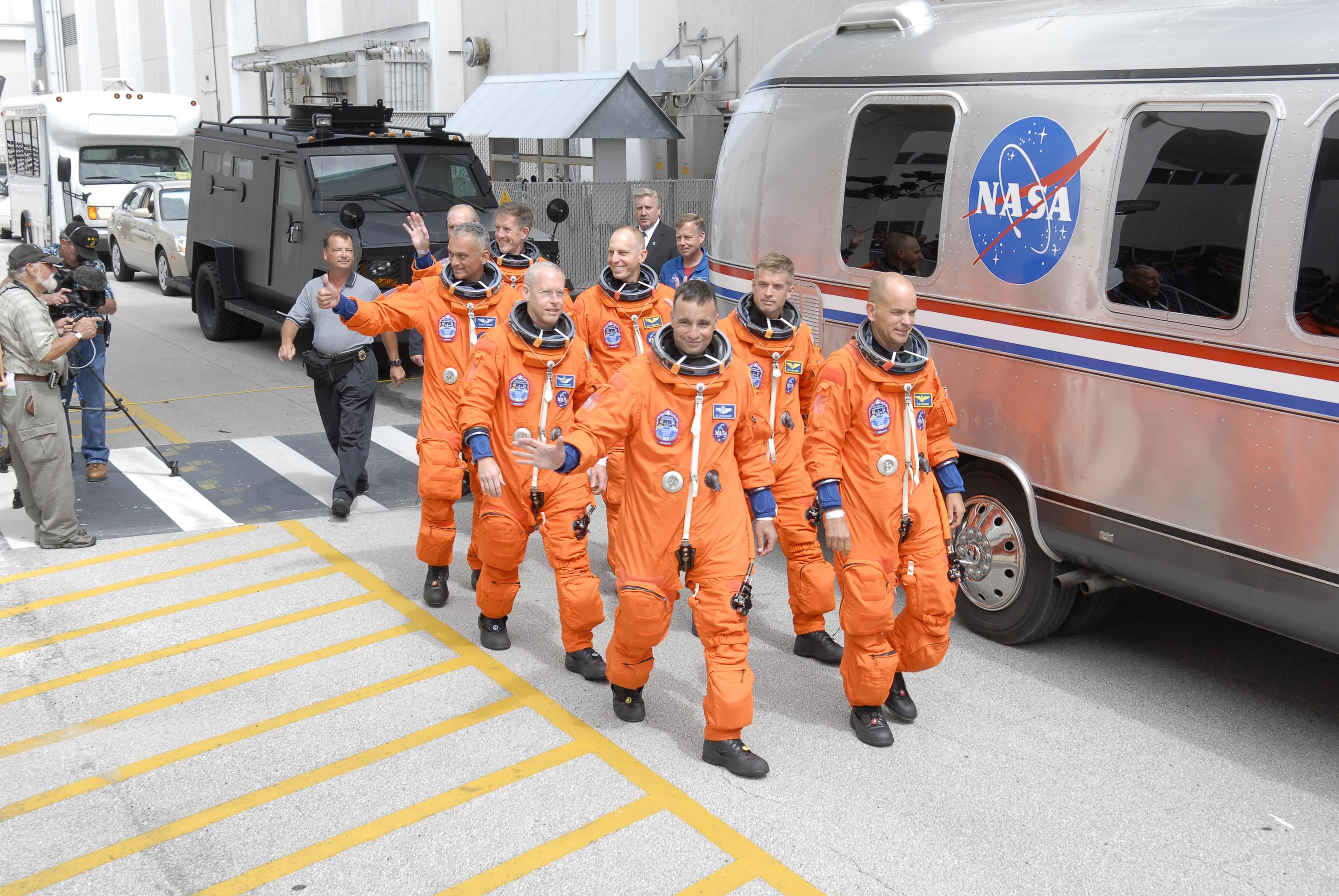
STS-117 crewmembers head for the astrovan

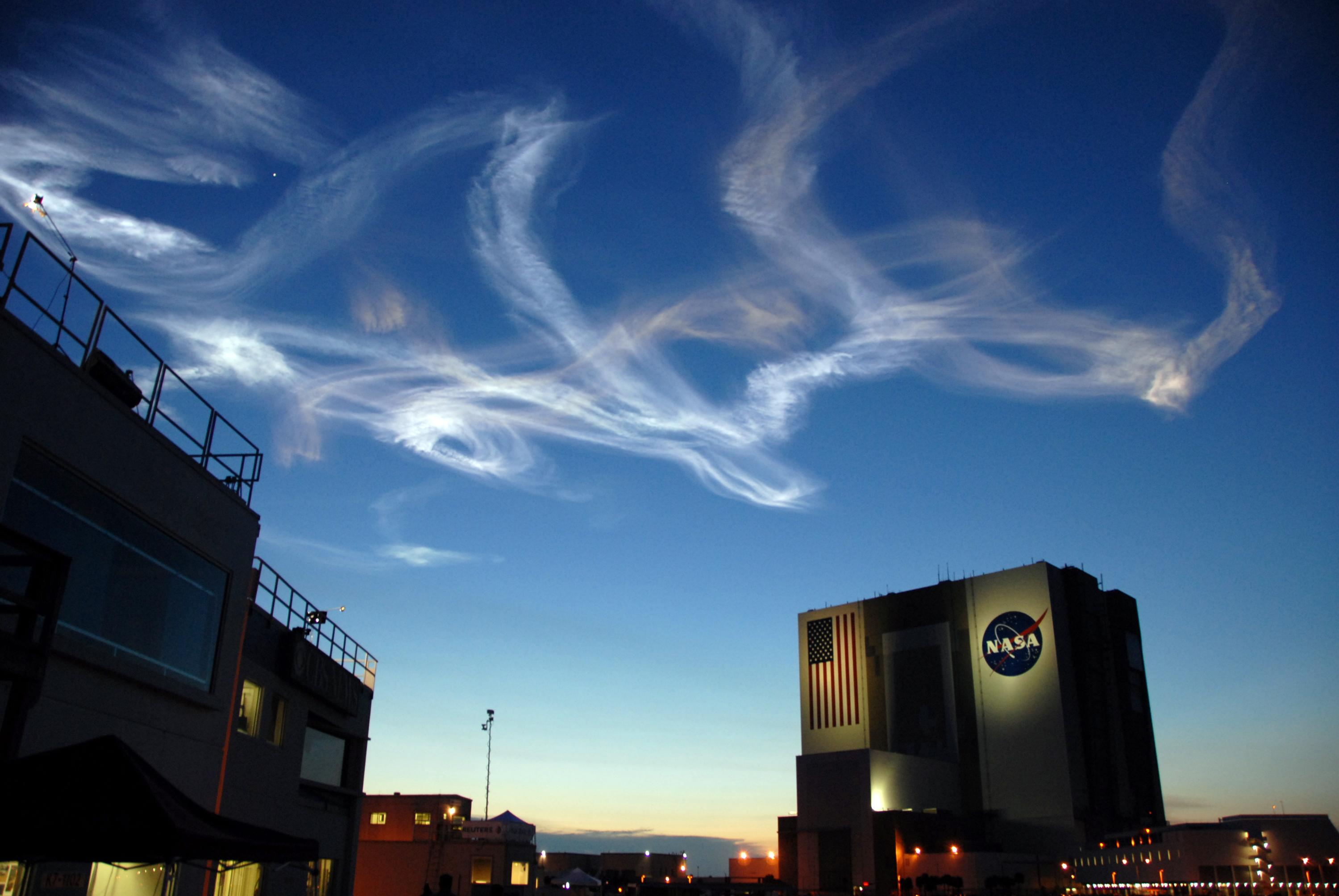
Drifting smoke plume left over from launch of Atlantis

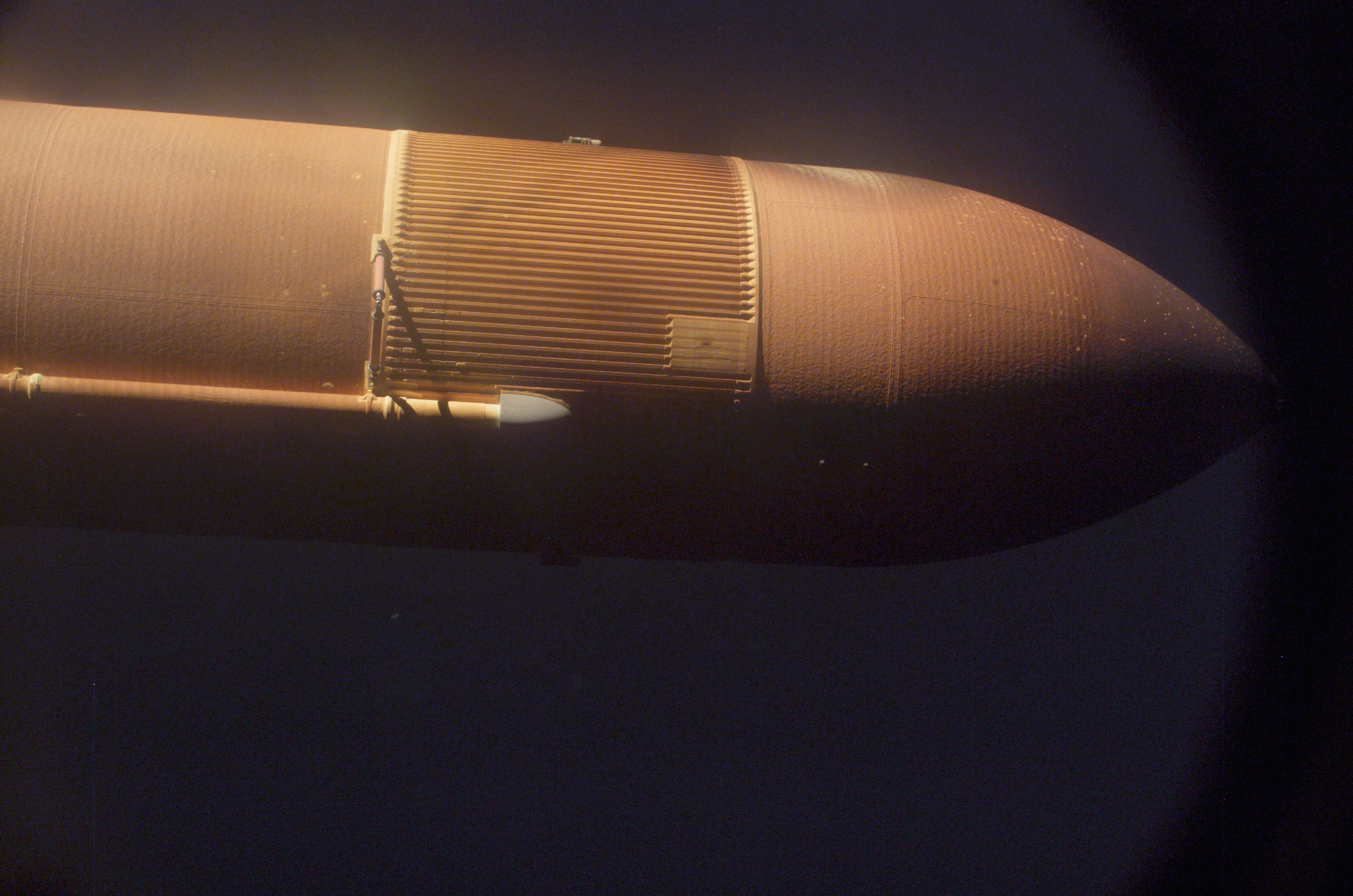
Forward portion of the separating ET-124 from the shuttle

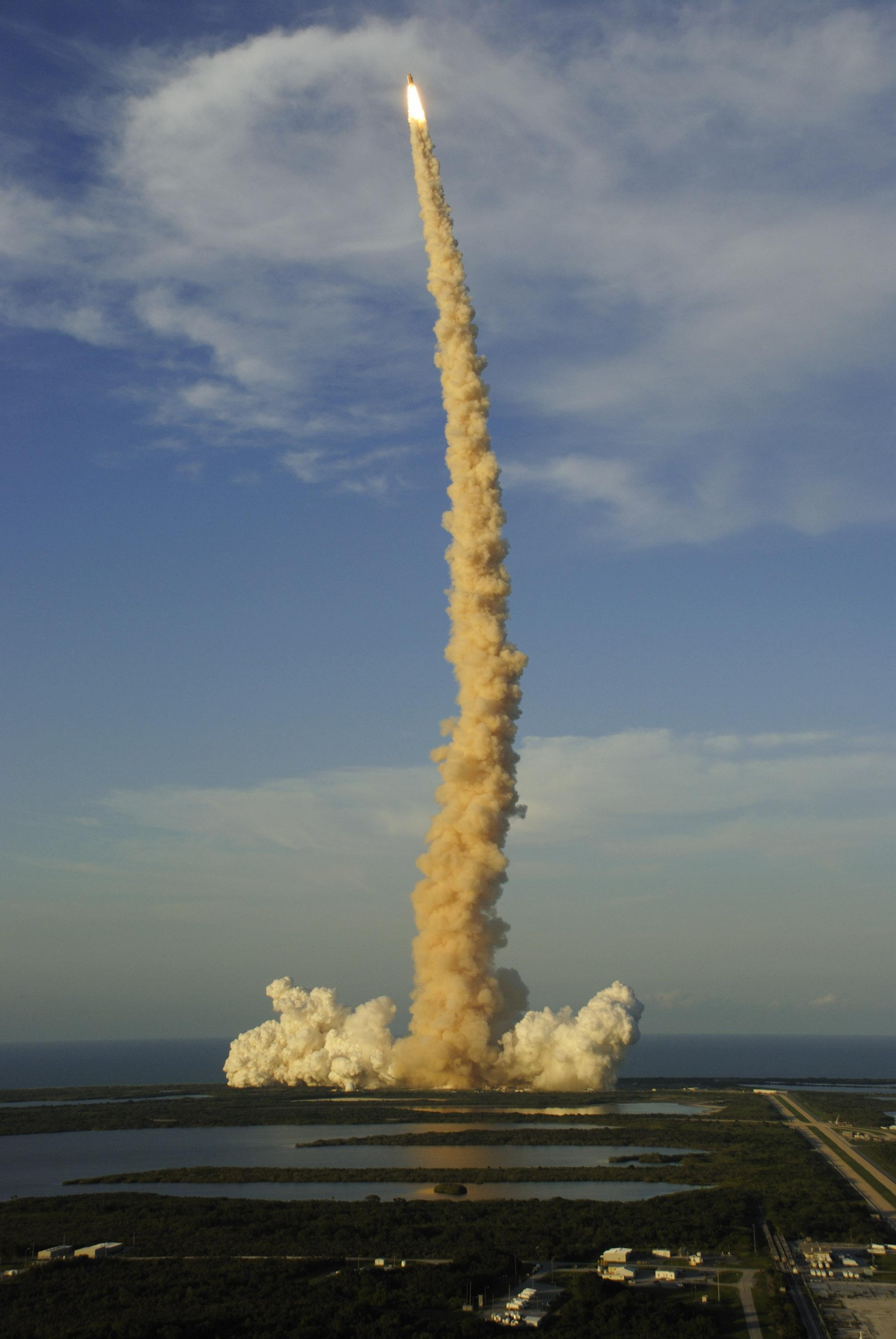
Launch of Space Shuttle Atlantis viewed from the top of the Vehicle Assembly Building

=== June 9 (Flight day 2 – TPS survey) ===
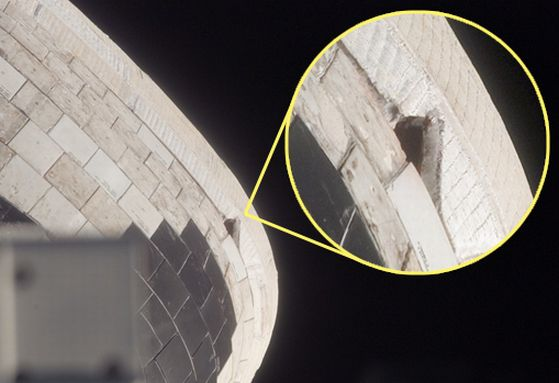
The peeled-back thermal blanket on OMS pod.

During its first full day in orbit, crewmembers aboard Atlantis inspected the shuttle's heat shield. The crew was given an extra half-hour to sleep after being kept up late to finish downloading in-cabin video.

Pilot Lee Archambault and Mission Specialists Patrick Forrester and Steven Swanson used the shuttle's robotic arm and orbiter boom sensor system (OBSS) to inspect the heat shield on Atlantis' wing leading edges and nose cap. Based on lessons learned during the previous three post-Columbia missions, during STS-117, the crew used new inspection procedures devised by NASA. The scans took less time, covered a larger area and they used a camera on the end of the OBSS to take close-up photographs at the same time the laser scanner was collecting data. The astronauts started with the starboard wing leading edge, making multiple passes up and down the wing to cover all the angles. After scanning the nose cap, they moved on to the port wing and repeated the procedure.

The crew also down-linked Mission Control Houston engineers up-close video of the displaced portion of the blanket on the port orbital maneuvering system pod.

While the robotic arm survey proceeded, Mission Specialists "Danny" Olivas, James Reilly and Clayton Anderson conducted a thorough checkout of the spacesuits to be worn during the spacewalks planned for the docked operations at the space station and prepared them and other EVA hardware for transfer to the space station. The crew also installed a centerline camera, extend the outer ring of the Orbiter Docking System, and checked out rendezvous tools.

=== June 10 (Flight day 3 – Docking) ===
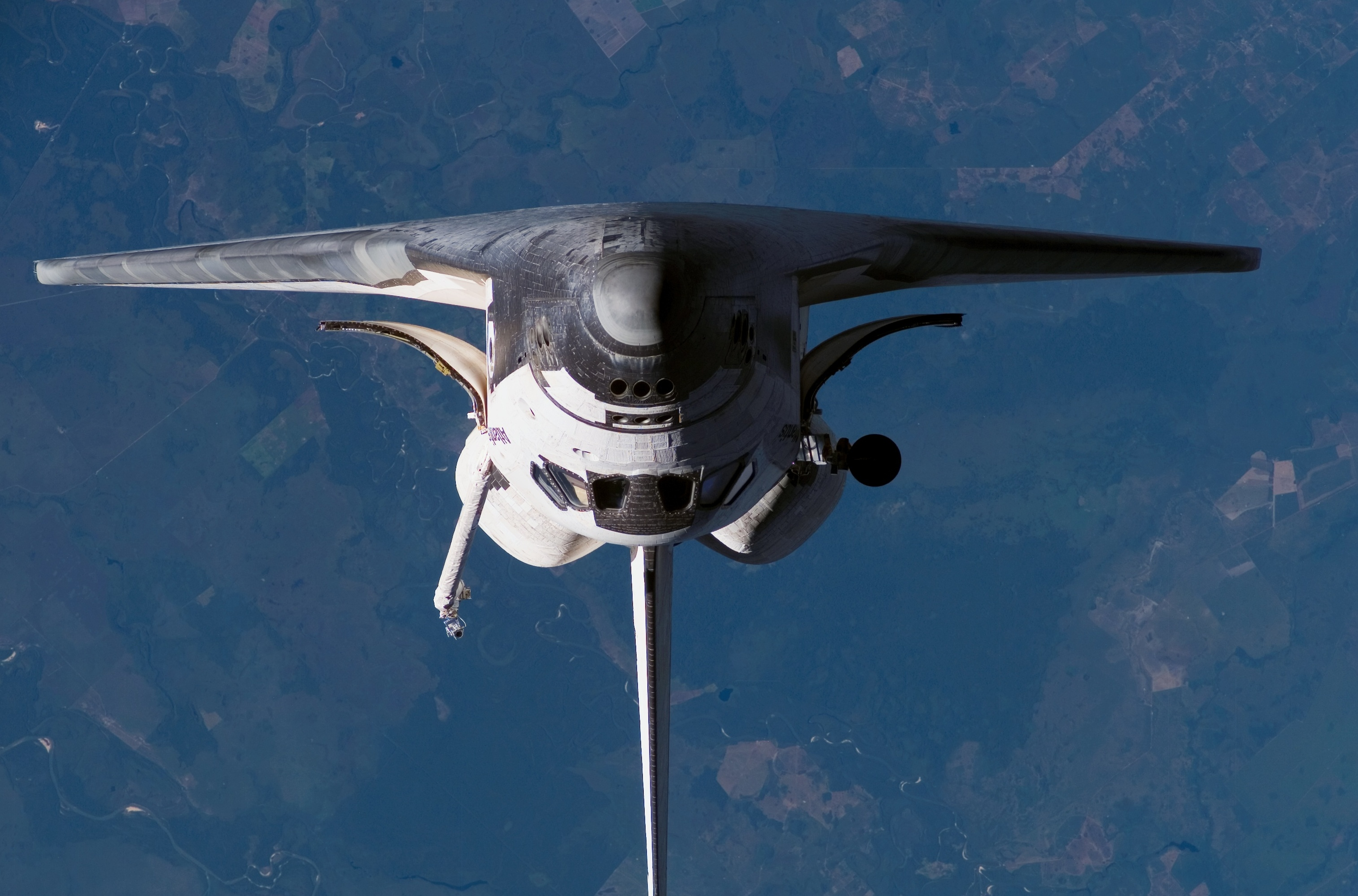
Space Shuttle Atlantis performs the RPM.

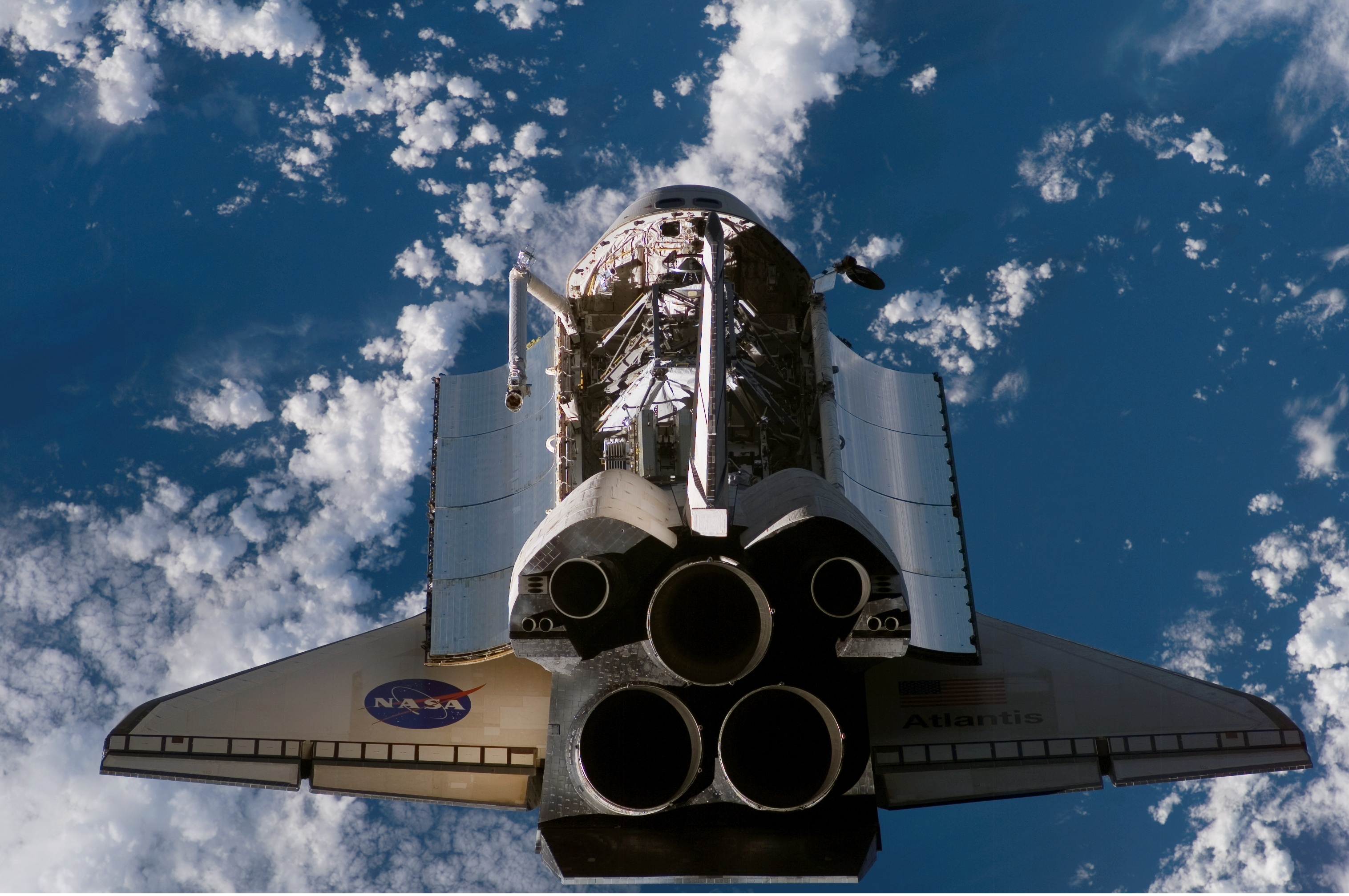
Atlantis with the truss segment in its payload bay

Atlantis' crew was awakened at 13:08 UTC. Guided by the Terminal Insertion burn to refine the shuttle's trajectory—Atlantis closed in on the ISS. Before the shuttle docked, at a distance of 600 feet (180 m) below the station, STS-117 Commander Rick Sturckow performed what is known as the Rendezvous Pitch Maneuver (RPM). The back flip RPM allowed station crewmembers Fyodor Yurchikhin and Oleg Kotov to photograph heat shield tiles on the shuttle's underside using long-range, high resolution cameras.

Atlantis docked to Destiny/Pressurized Mating Adapter-2 on the ISS at 19:36 UTC while the two spacecraft were traveling 220 miles (350 km) above the northeast coast of Australia. A few minutes later, hooks and latches were activated to firmly pull the two spacecraft together. After leak checks to make sure the interface is airtight, the hatch between them was opened at 21:20 UTC and the station crew welcomed the shuttle crew. Shortly after welcoming the shuttle crew, station Flight Engineer Oleg Kotov and shuttle Mission Specialist Clayton Anderson transferred Anderson's customized Soyuz seat liner into the Russian spacecraft in place of that of Flight Engineer Suni Williams. The transfer marked the official swap of Anderson for Williams as a station crewmember.

Following docking, Pilot Lee Archambault and Mission Specialist Patrick Forrester used the shuttle's Canadarm to grapple the S3/S4 truss, lift it from its berth in the payload bay, and maneuver it for handover to the station's Canadarm2. After hatch opening, Suni Williams used the Canadarm2 to take the truss from the shuttle's robotic arm. That task was completed at 00:28 UTC marking the completion of the handover. The truss remained grappled to the station's arm until next day's installation.

Mission Specialists James Reilly and John "Danny" Olivas spent the night in the Quest airlock as part of the overnight "campout" procedure to help them get prepared for next day's spacewalk.

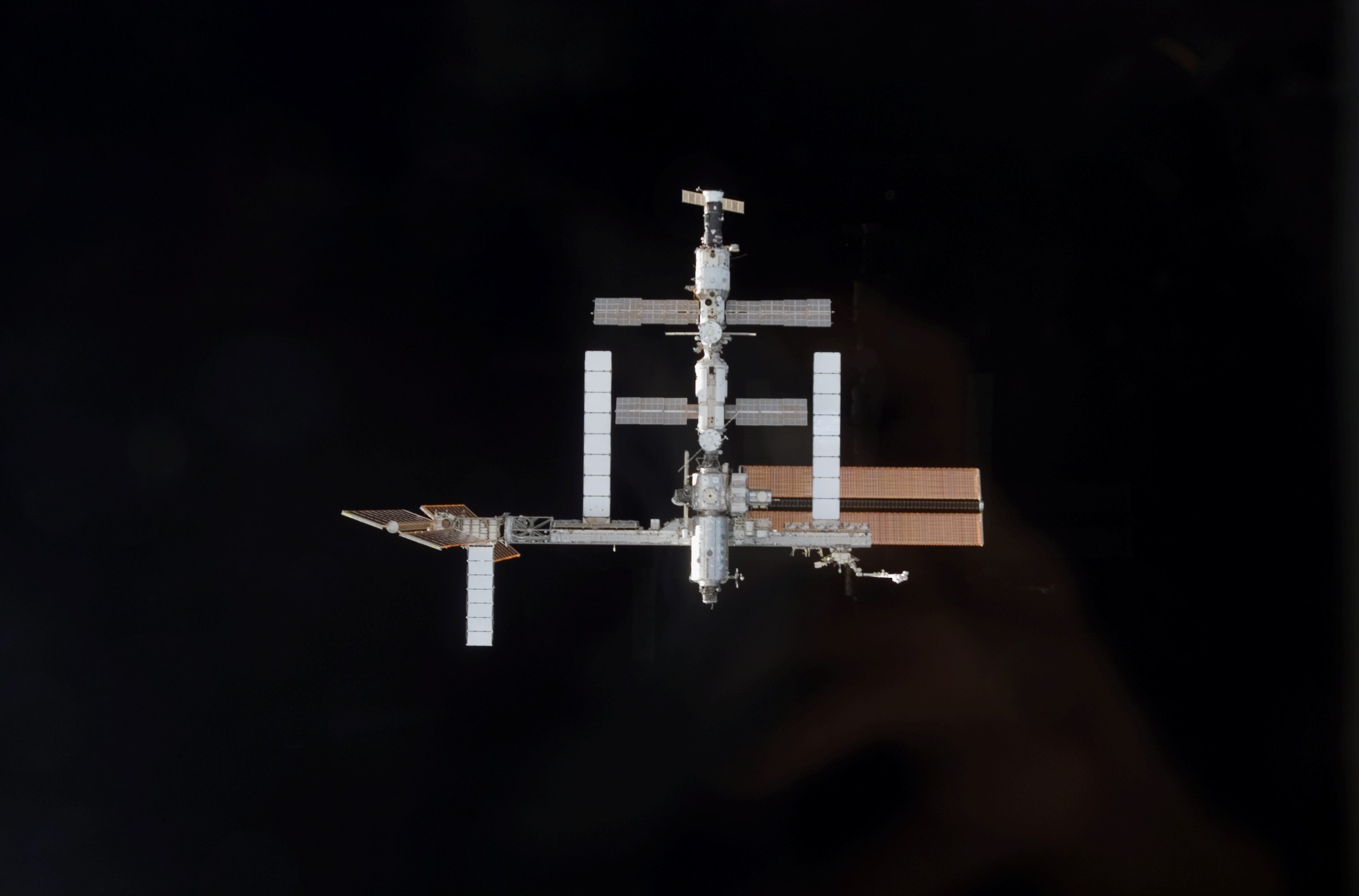
The ISS seen from Atlantis

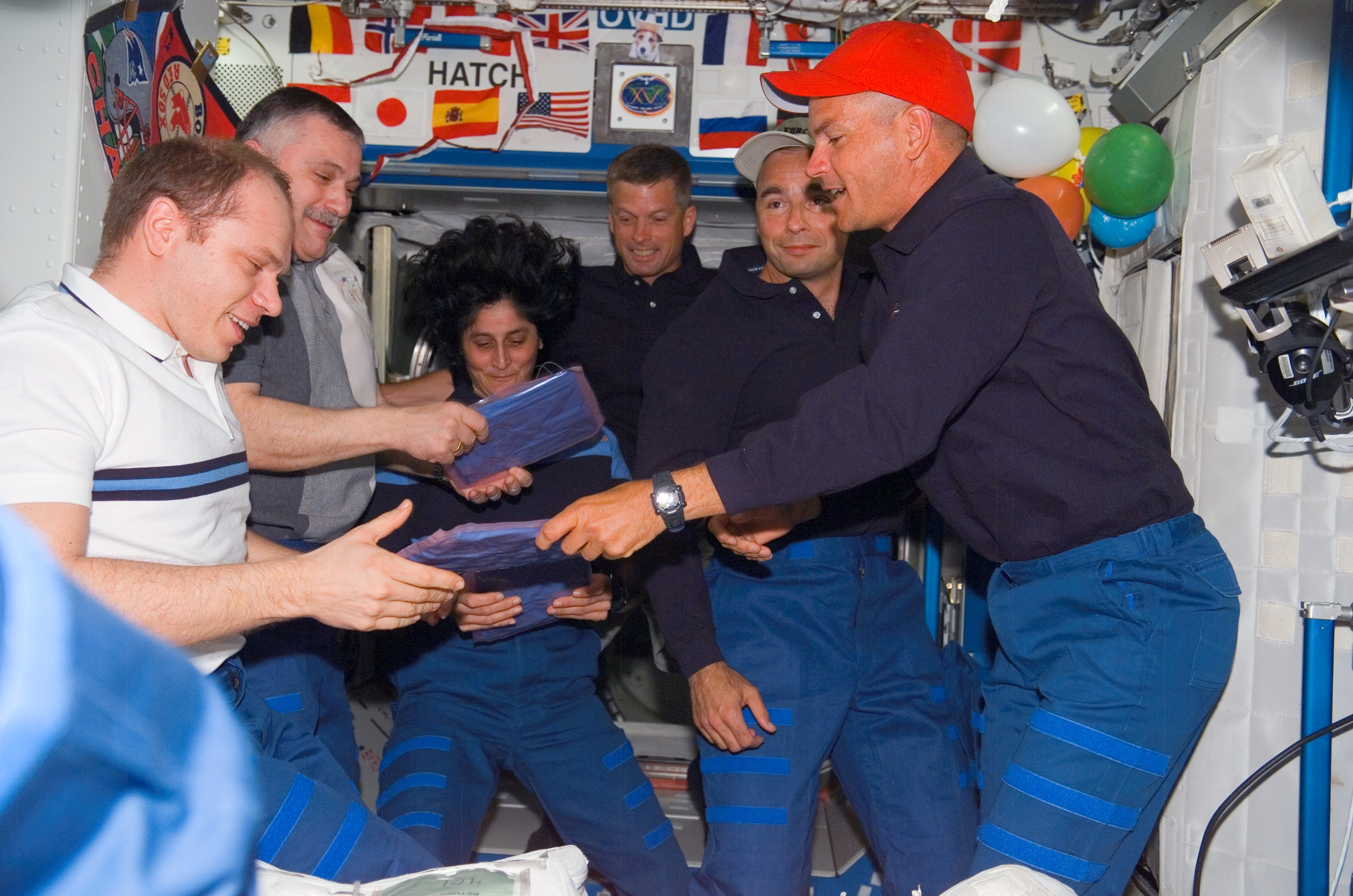
The STS-117 crewmembers give the station crewmembers packages

=== June 11 (Flight day 4 – EVA 1) ===
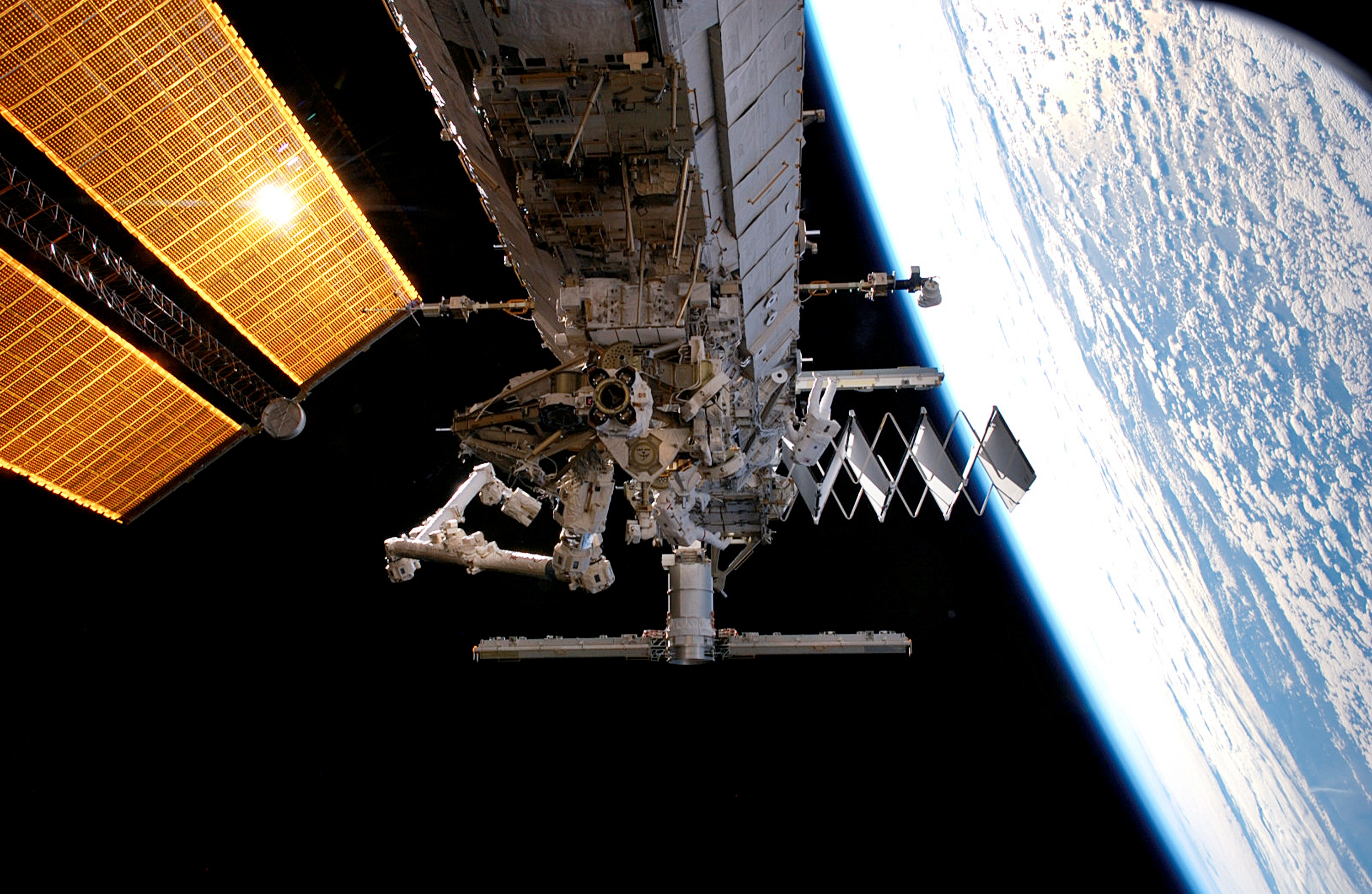
Mission Specialists Reilly and Olivas participates in EVA 1.

Pilot Archambault, Mission Specialist Forrester and station Flight Engineer Kotov used the SSRMS to mate the S3/S4 truss to the outboard end of the S1 truss. The installation paved the way for the start of the spacewalk planned for the day.

After venturing out of the Quest airlock into space, Mission Specialists Reilly and Olivas released launch restraints on the four Solar Array Blanket Boxes, which house the folded solar arrays. They made final attachment of bolts, cables and connectors, and began preparations for the activation of the truss. The two spacewalkers rotated the array canisters into their normal position for deployment on the next day. The start of the spacewalk was delayed for about an hour after the station temporarily lost attitude control when the station's control moment gyroscopes (CMGs) went offline. The spacewalk started after station's gyroscopes were initialized by flight controllers.

EVA 1 marked the 84th devoted to the ISS assembly and maintenance. It was also the fourth for Reilly and first for Olivas.

NASA's Mission Management Team also decided to extend Atlantis' mission by two days and to add a fourth spacewalk. John Shannon, the head of NASA's STS-117 Mission Management Team during the day's mission briefing told reporters that the extra time would give the crew to complete the ISS assembly tasks and allow ground engineers to draw up plans to repair the damaged blanket on the OMS pod of Atlantis. NASA deemed that the torn blanket, while not a flight risk to the shuttle crew during reentry, could lead to some damage to the OMS pod's internal honeycomb-like graphite-epoxy structure. Such a damage would require additional time to repair once the Shuttle returns to Earth, NASA said.

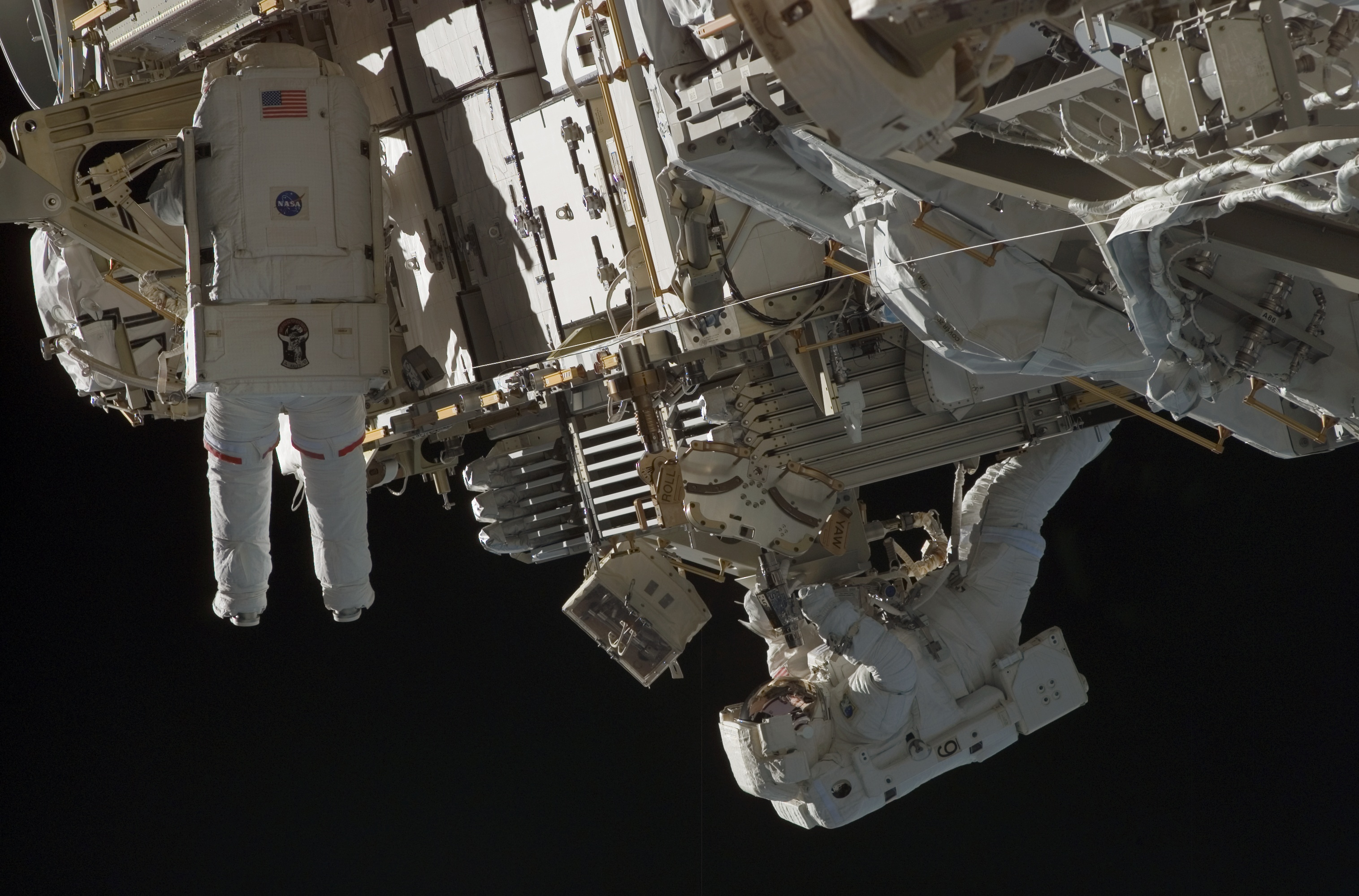
James Reilly (left) and John Olivas during EVA 1

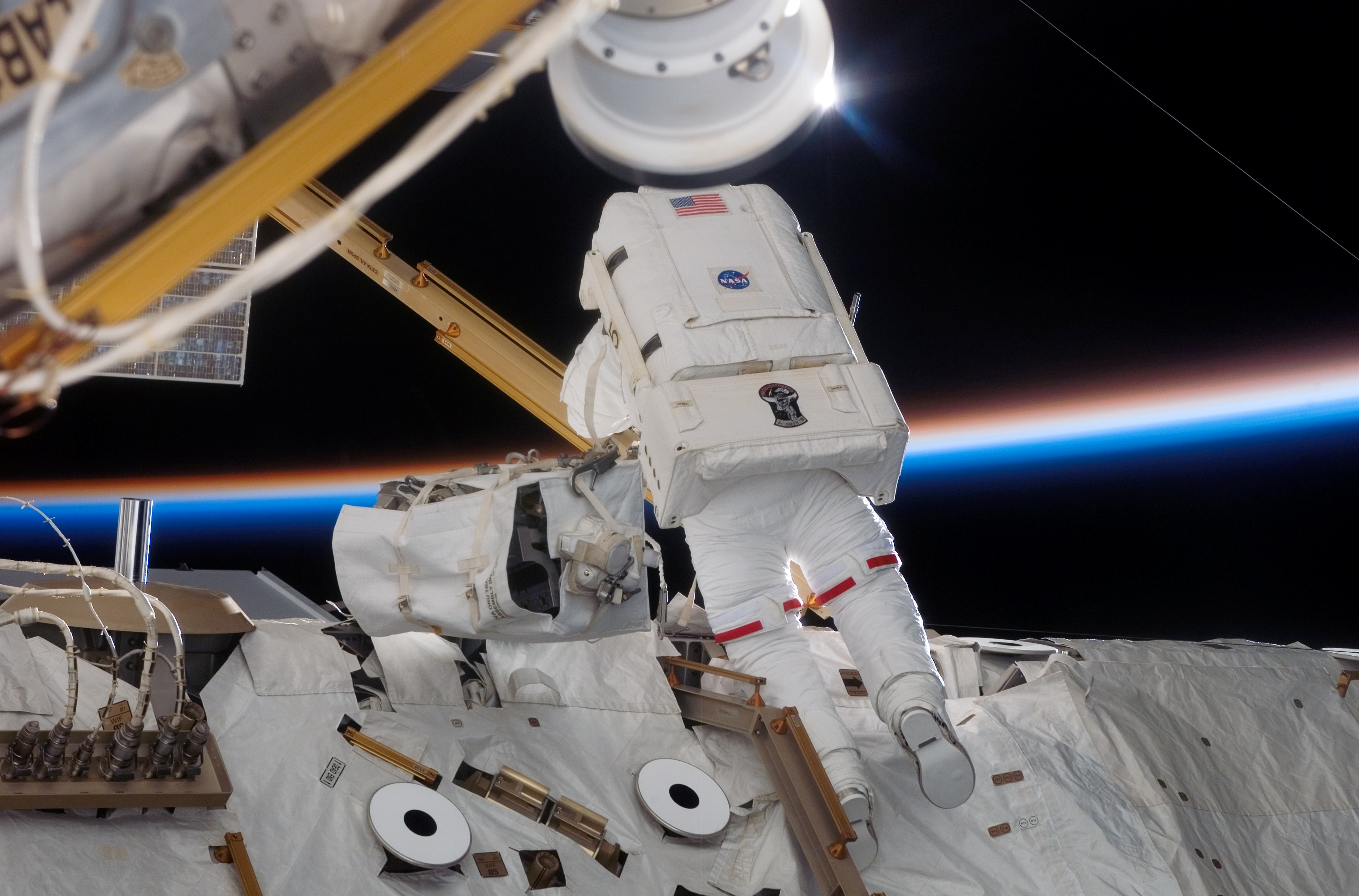
Astronaut James Reilly participate in EVA 1

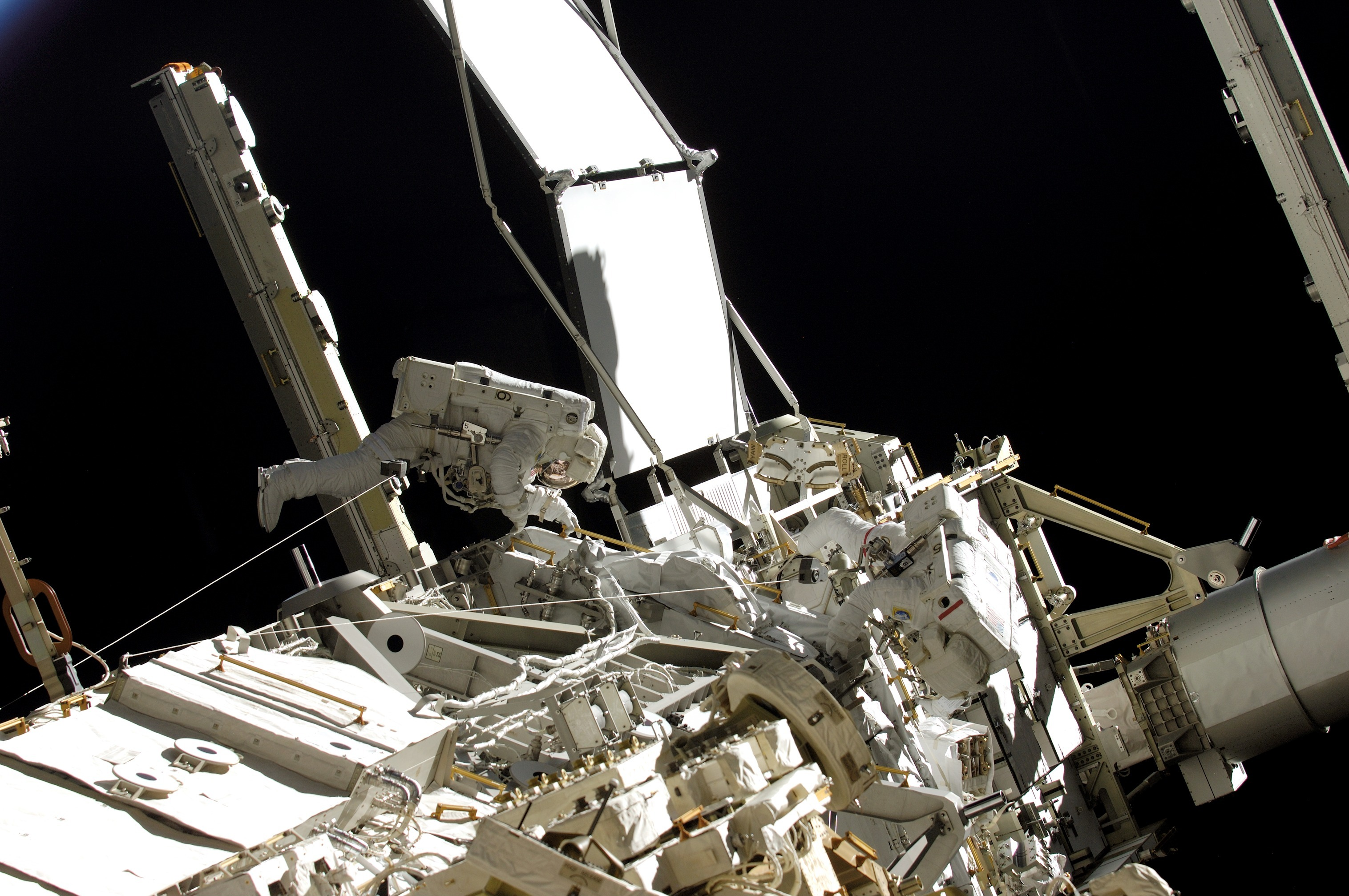
James Reilly (right) and John Olivas during EVA 1

=== June 12 (Flight day 5 – Solar array deployment) ===
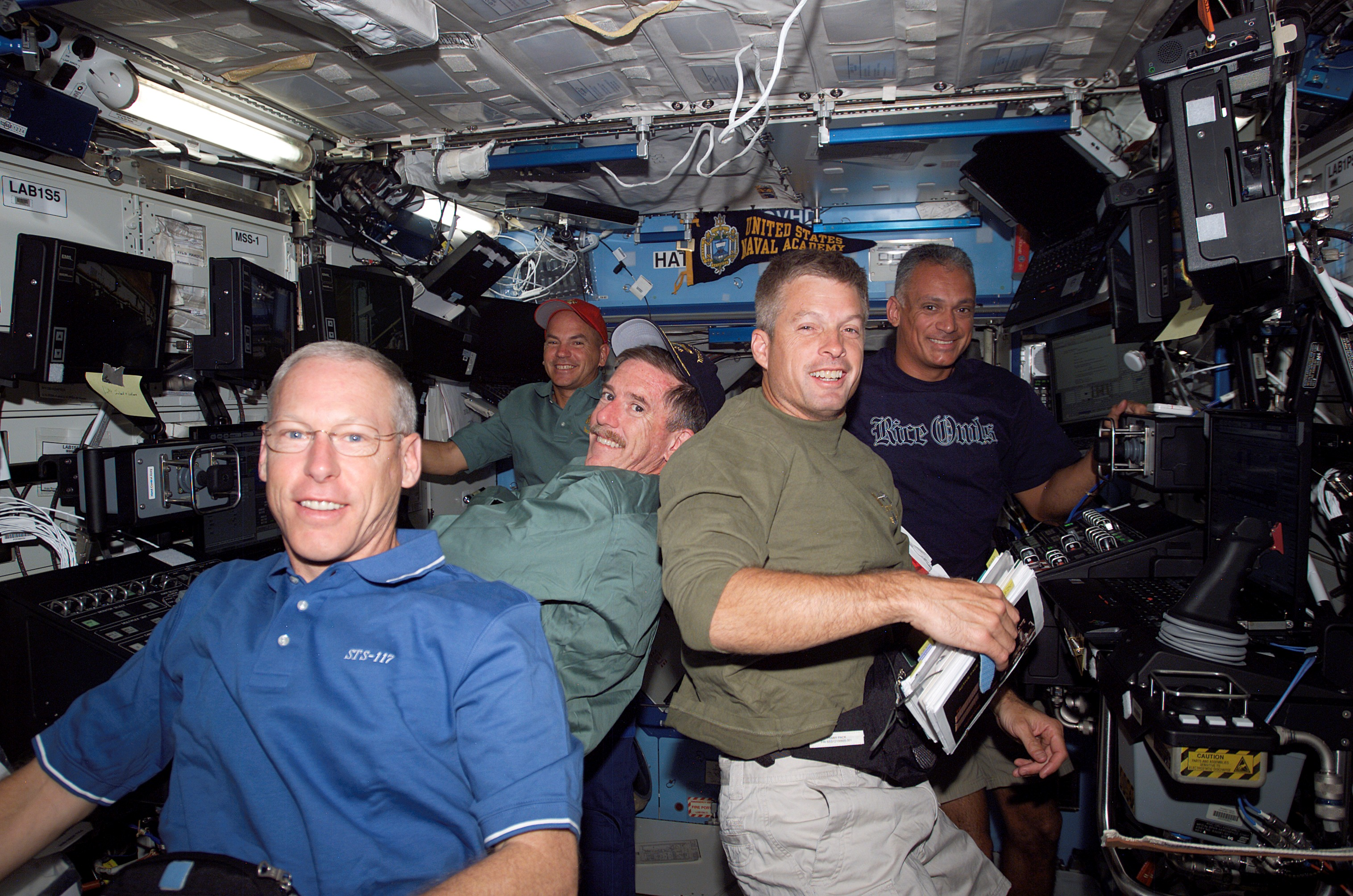
STS-117 crewmembers in the Destiny laboratory.

The successful deployment of the S3/S4 solar arrays was the highlight of the day, adding significantly to the ISS power generation capabilities. Prior to crew wake up, station controllers began unfurling the solar array attached to the S3/S4 truss segment. Shuttle crew then took over, unfolding one wing at a time in stages, pausing to let the sunlight warm the solar array panels which helped to prevent the thin individual panels from sticking together. The crew finished unfolding the first wing at 11:29 am CDT and the second at 12:58 pm CDT.

There were continuing problems with the station's electrically driven gyroscopes, the preferred, non-propulsive, method for controlling the ISS due to a problem with a Russian navigation computer. The navigation computer problem started when flight controllers attempted to turn attitude control over to the ISS computers after letting shuttle computers handle it while the arrays were unfolded. The navigation computer would not allow them to do so, and forced a reboot of the main Russian command and control computer. The forced reboot triggered an alarm enunciating the problem to the crew and ground controllers.

The issues appeared to have been resolved by the end of the day and the station's gyroscopes took over attitude control shortly after 8 pm CDT. That was followed by relocation of the Mobile Transporter in preparation ahead the next day's spacewalk. The crew or shuttle/station combined stack never was in danger throughout the troubleshooting efforts.

=== June 13 (Flight day 6 – EVA 2) ===
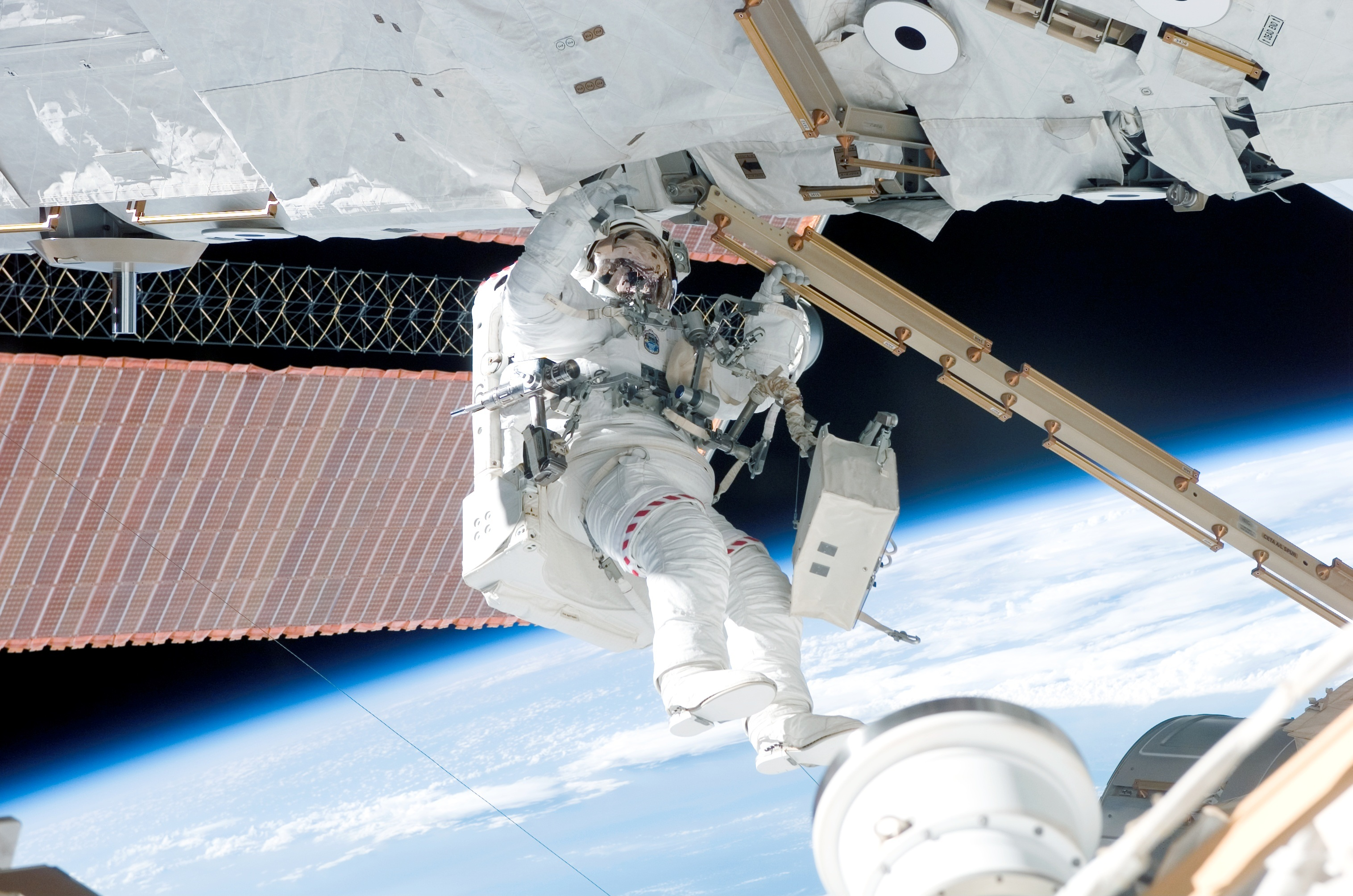
Astronaut Steven Swanson participates in EVA 2

Flight day 6 saw mission specialists Patrick Forrester and Steven Swanson perform the second of four planned spacewalks. The main task of the spacewalk was to prepare the Solar Alpha Rotary Joint (SARJ) between the S3 and S4 Truss segments for rotation. The two spacewalkers and their crew mates were awakened at 13:08 UTC to begin the day's activities.

Mission Specialists John Olivas and Sunita Williams helped Forrester and Swanson to get readied with the EVA. Commander Sturckow, pilot Archambault and Mission Specialist Jim Reilly worked the early steps of retraction of the 2B solar array wing, on the starboard side of the P6 Truss. They sent commands and monitored the retraction.

After exiting Quest at 18:03 UTC the two spacewalkers moved up the P6 Truss to monitor the retraction of the 2B Sollar Array and to assist if required. Forrester, was in a foot restraint on the station's Canadarm2, and Swanson had specially-prepared tools to use to help the panels of photovoltaic cells fold properly. Flight controllers were able to get seven and a half of the 31.5 solar array bays folded. Then, Forrester and Swanson were able to poke and prod another five and a half bays worth of panels into folding correctly (some 45 feet) before moving on to the SARJ.

Forrester and Swanson completed EVA 2 with mixed results. The duo removed all of the launch locks holding the SARJ in place. The spacewalkers had planned to remove the SARJ's launch restraints as well, but ran into problem when Forrester tried to install a drive-lock assembly. They discovered that the S3/S4 SARJ motor control circuits were wired in reverse. As such commands being sent to the drive-lock assembly were actually being received by a drive-lock assembly that was installed during EVA 1. So one launch lock restraint was left in place to prevent the possibility of undesired rotation.

EVA 2 marked the 85th spacewalk devoted to station assembly and maintenance.

As EVA 2 progressed, Mission managers approved a repair task for the damaged thermal blanket to be carried out during the next spacewalk, EVA 3. Overnight the Russian flight controllers also worked to resolve the problem with the Russian segment computers. During the day, with the shuttle's propulsion providing backup, the station's control moment gyroscopes were handling attitude control.

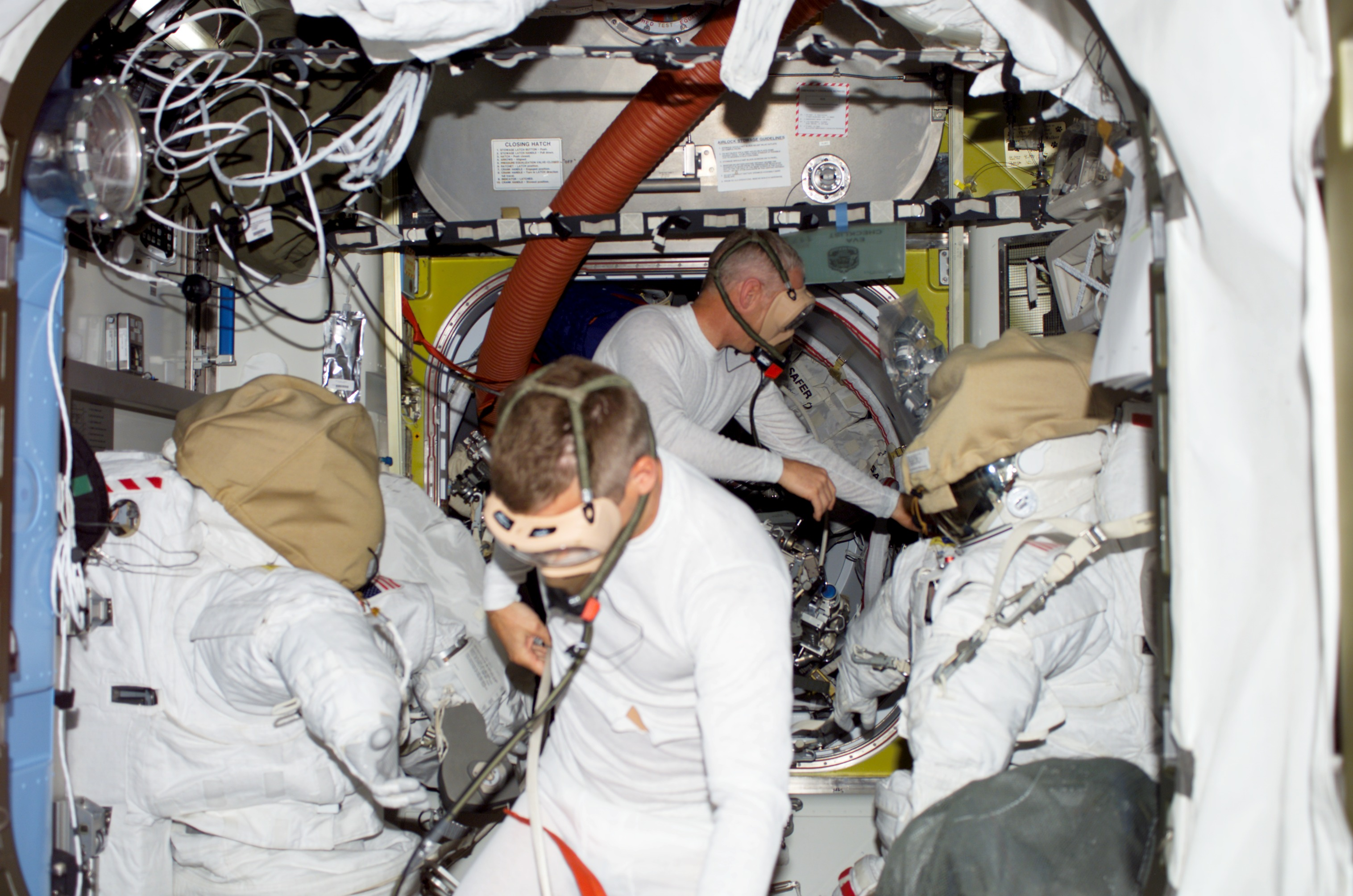
Mission Specialists Swanson and Forrester in the midst of the pre-breathe exercise

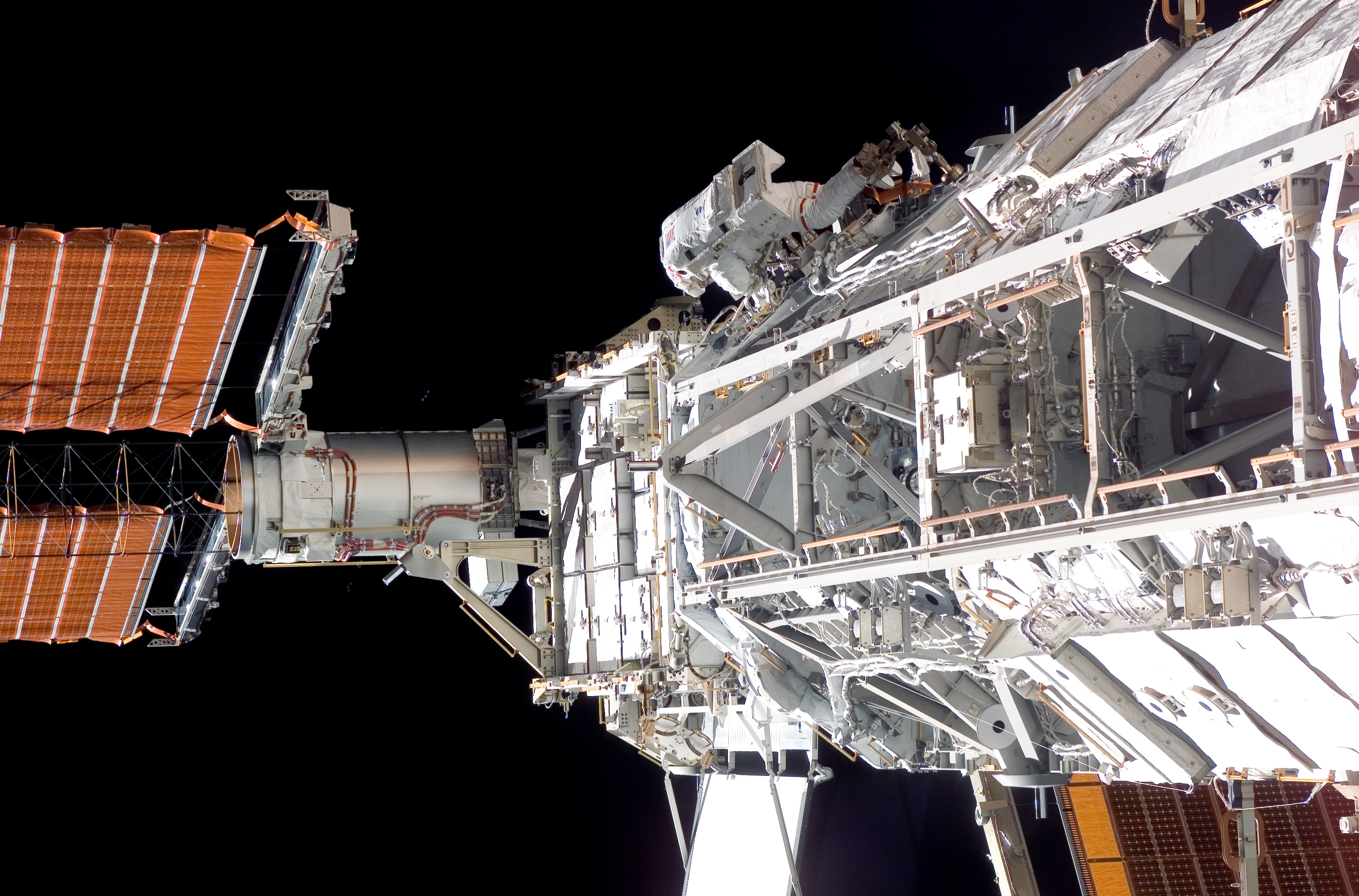
Mission Specialist Patrick Forrester during EVA 2

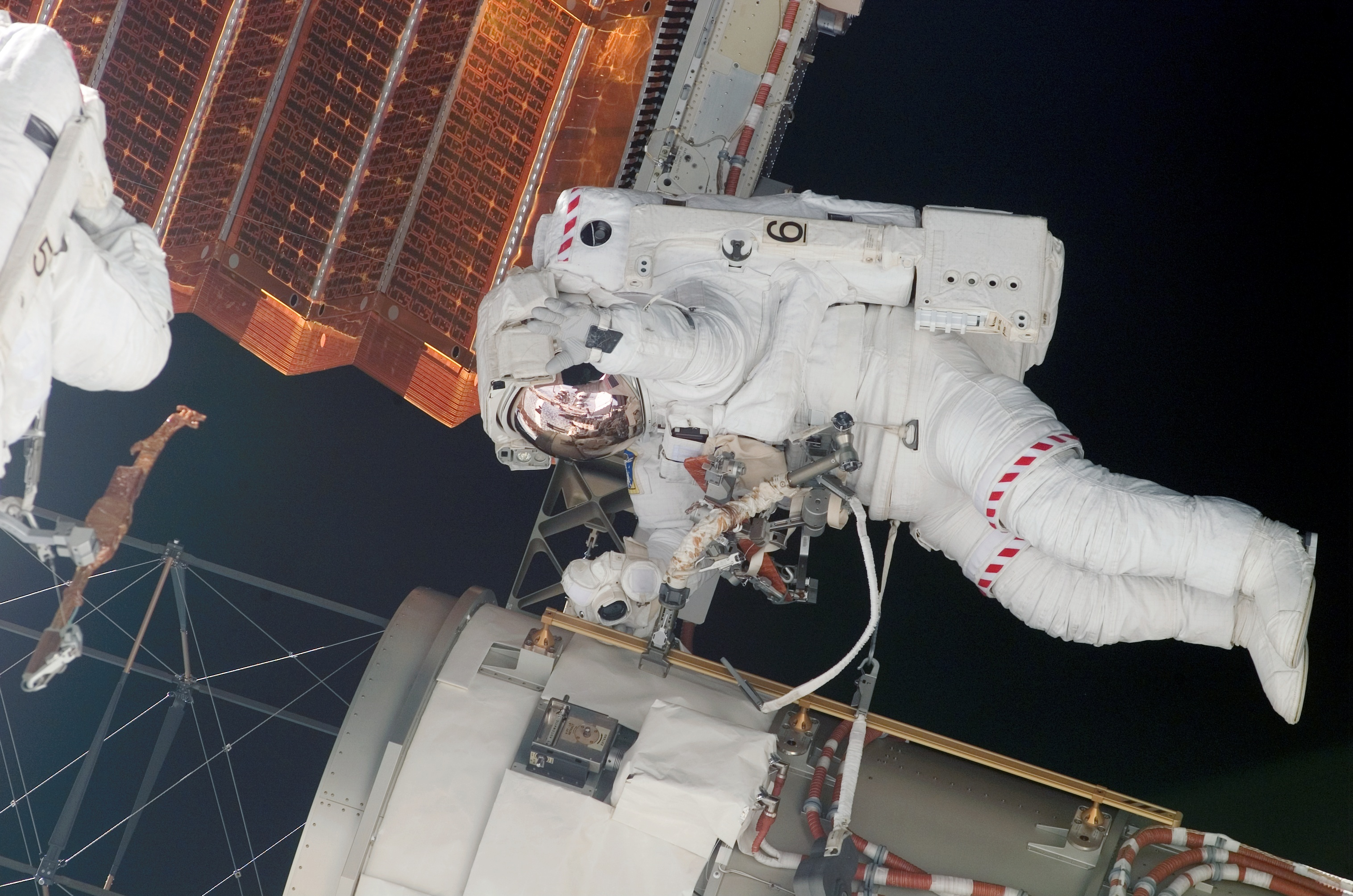
Mission Specialist Steven Swanson during EVA 2

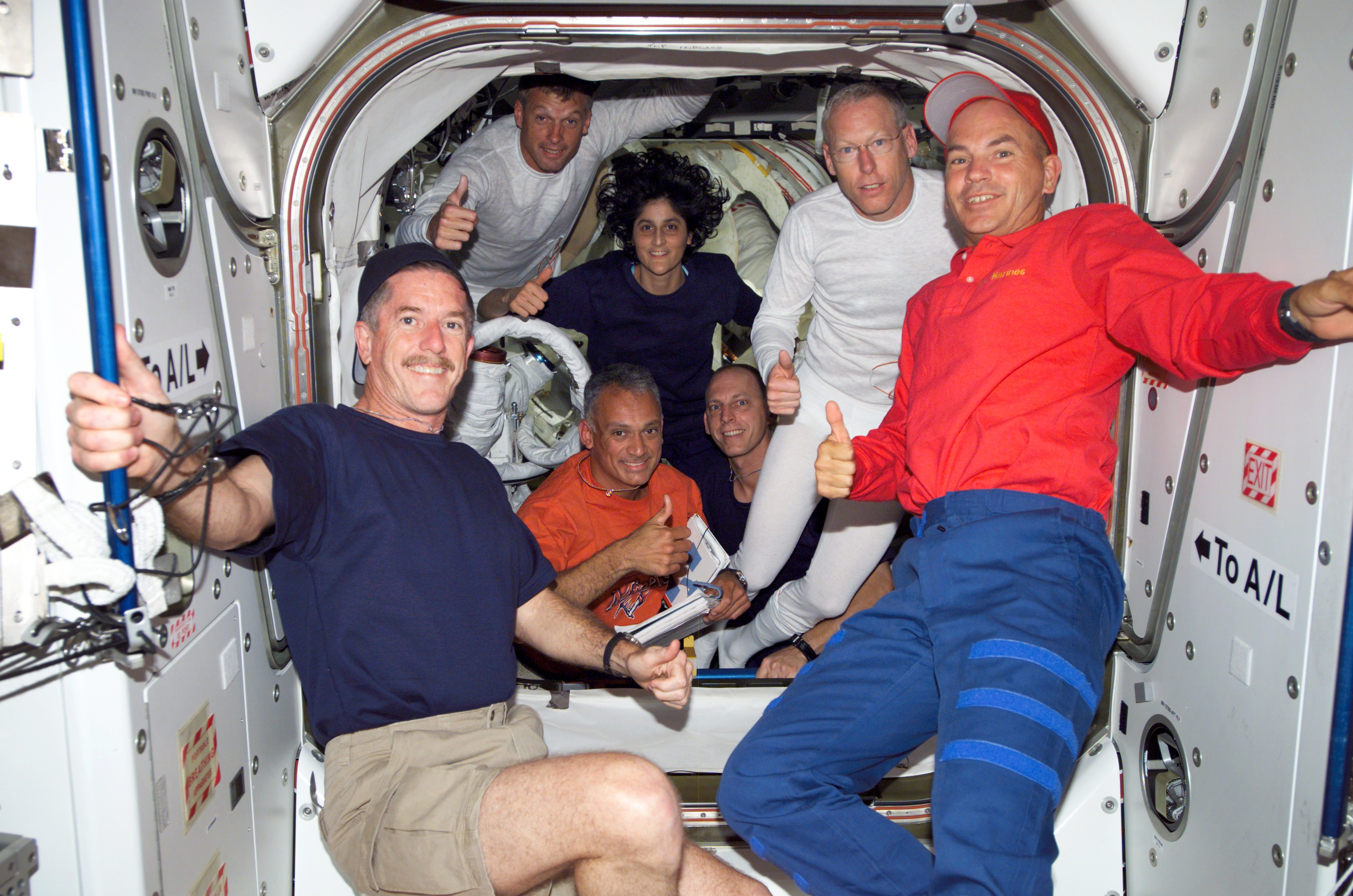
Crew members give a "thumbs-up" signal at the conclusion of EVA 2

=== June 14 (Flight day 7) ===
A computer malfunction on the Russian segments of the ISS occurred at 06:30 UTC and left the space station without orientation control. A successful restart of the computers resulted in a false fire alarm which awakened the crew at 11:43 UTC. Engineers theorized that the new S4 solar array, or components in the circuitry delivering that power to the Russian segment of the ISS, triggered some subtle change in the ISS electrical grid.

The solar array blanket atop the P6 truss was furled to a little more than half its original length by the Atlantis and the station crews. Commander Rick Sturckow, along with Pilot Lee Archambault, Mission Specialist Sunita Williams and Flight Engineer Clayton Anderson, meticulously retracted the solar array blanket another three bays worth of panels. The crew carefully sent commands to retract the array as much as possible ahead of EVA 3. By last count, 15 and a half of the 31 and half bays remained to be folded into a 20-inch-deep protective box.

Mission Specialists James Reilly and John Olivas completed a review of procedures for EVA 3. Before going to sleep, the crew also talked about the mission with radio and television stations. After that Reilly and Olivas slept in the Quest Airlock for spacewalk pre-breathe campout protocol.

=== June 15 (Flight day 8 – EVA 3) ===
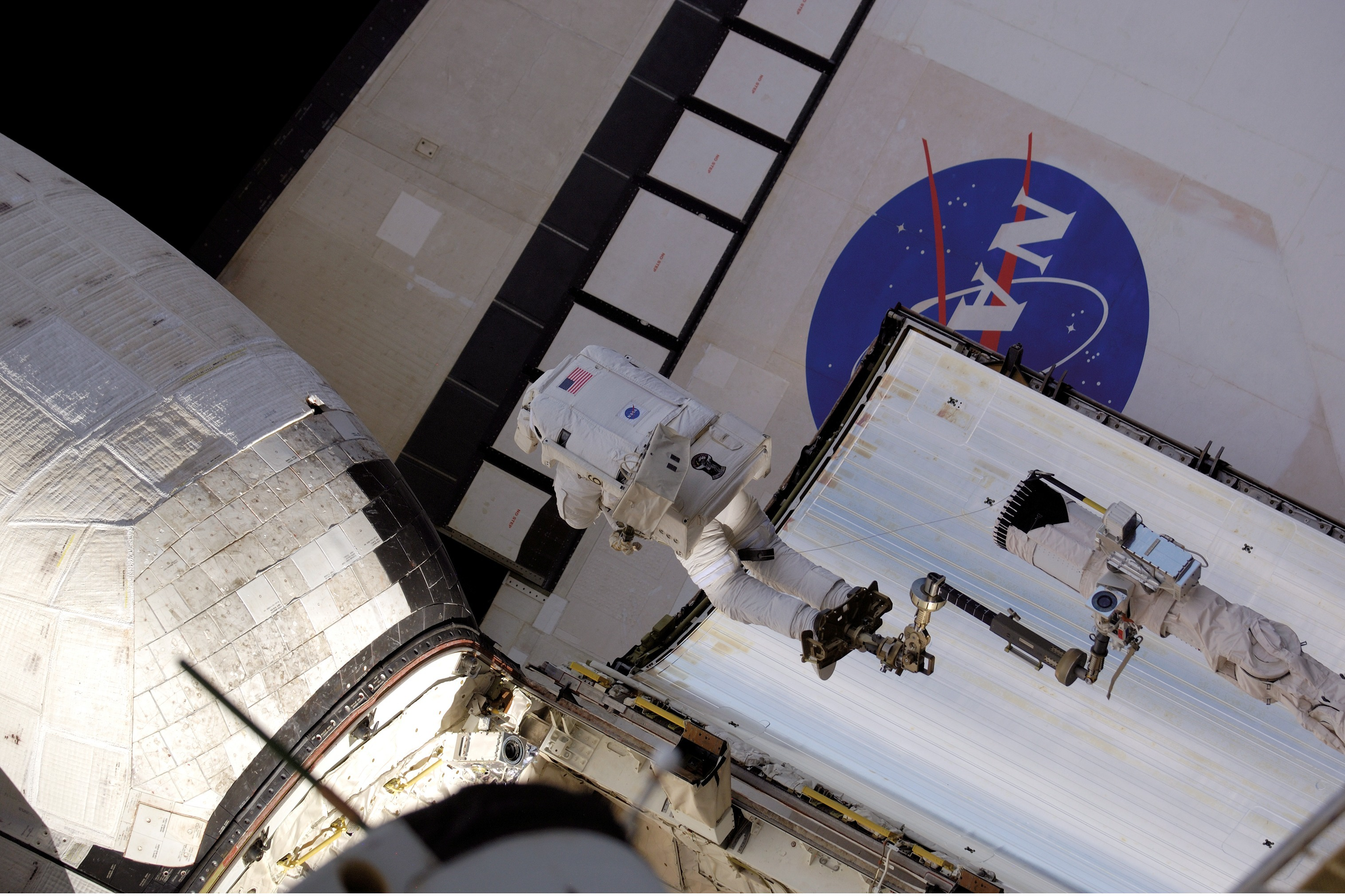
Astronaut John Olivas moves toward Atlantis' port OMS pod.

The crew's wakeup call came at 7:41 am CDT. Flight day 8 was dedicated to mission's third spacewalk (EVA 3) to repair the thermal blanket on Atlantis and assist in folding up a solar array on the space station.

Spacewalkers James Reilly and John Olivas began EVA 3 when the two astronauts switched their spacesuits into internal battery power and exited into space from the Quest airlock. It was the 86th EVA dedicated to ISS assembly and maintenance and the ninth for year 2007. While Olivas anchored to the end of Atlantis' robot arm was repairing the OMS pod, Reilly installed an external hydrogen vent for the oxygen generating system inside Destiny laboratory. By using his helmet camera, Olivas beamed down close-up views of the torn insulation and surrounding blankets to help flight controllers assess the system's condition. Olivas spent two hours stapling and pinning down a thermal blanket on the OMS pod.

Flight controllers from Houston also radioed Reilly that they had decided to have him disconnect the P-12 connector that was installed during EVA 1 since the Russian flight controllers were planning to make an attempt to restart the problematic computers in the ISS. Even though the connector was not in use at that time, engineers decided to have Reilly disconnect it to make sure that it was not causing any electrical noise or grounding issues that might have played a role in the computer trouble.

When those tasks were completed, the two astronauts along with their colleagues inside the shuttle and station and flight controllers in Houston completed the final retraction of the starboard P6 truss element. The retraction that required 28 commands was completed and latches closed seven hours, 15 minutes into the spacewalk at 7:40 pm CDT. The successful folding paved the way to relocate the P6 truss to its permanent location during STS-120. All tasks were completed successfully on during the 7 hours, 58-minute EVA activities.

Earlier on the day, U.S. and Russian engineers disconnected U.S. electrical power from the Russian computer system. But isolating the computers from U.S. power did not resolve the problem. The primary Russian computers were brought back online by bypassing a circuit. Secondary systems were left offline pending further work.

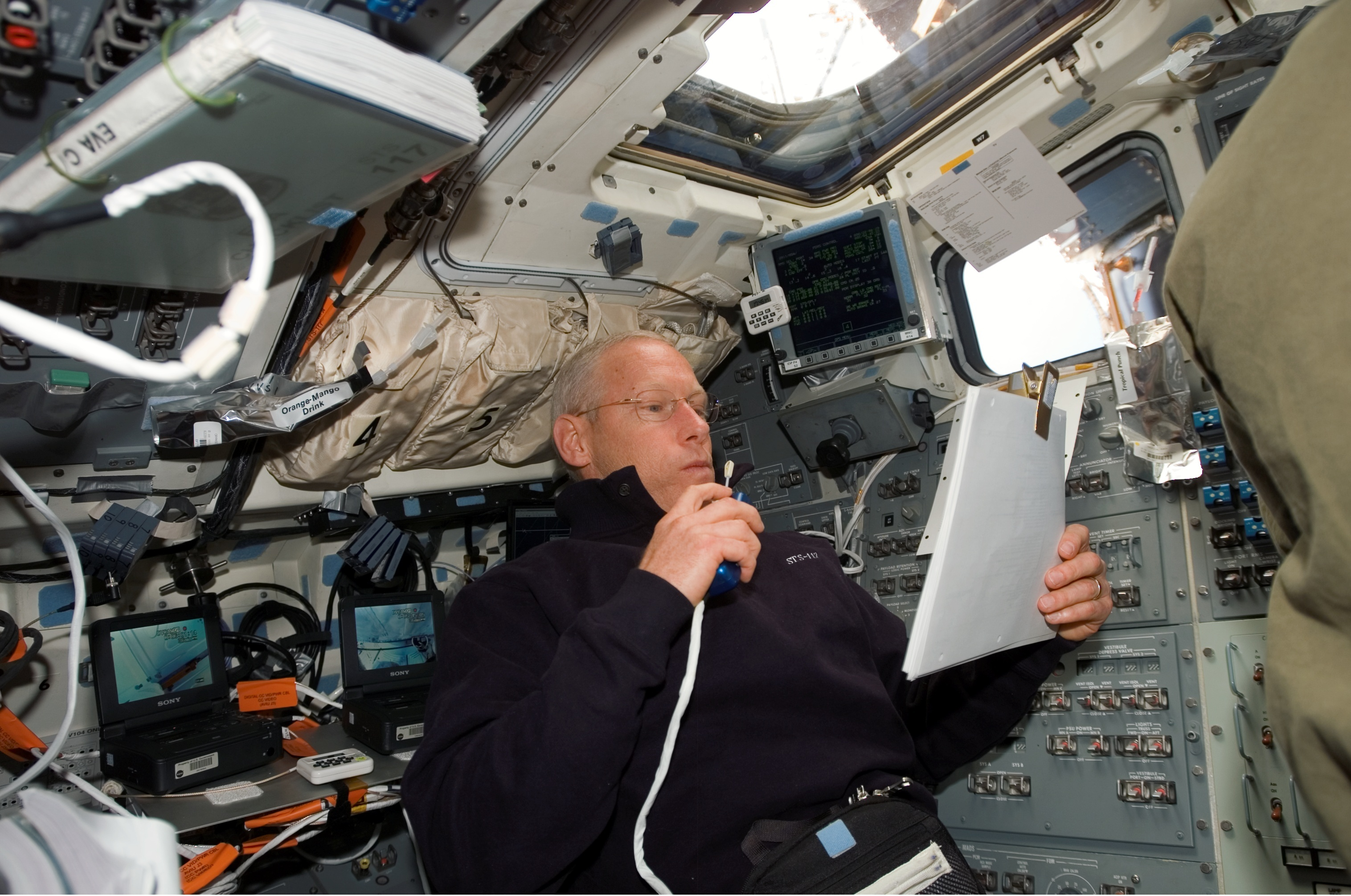
Patrick Forrester talks to ground controllers while on the aft flight deck of Atlantis

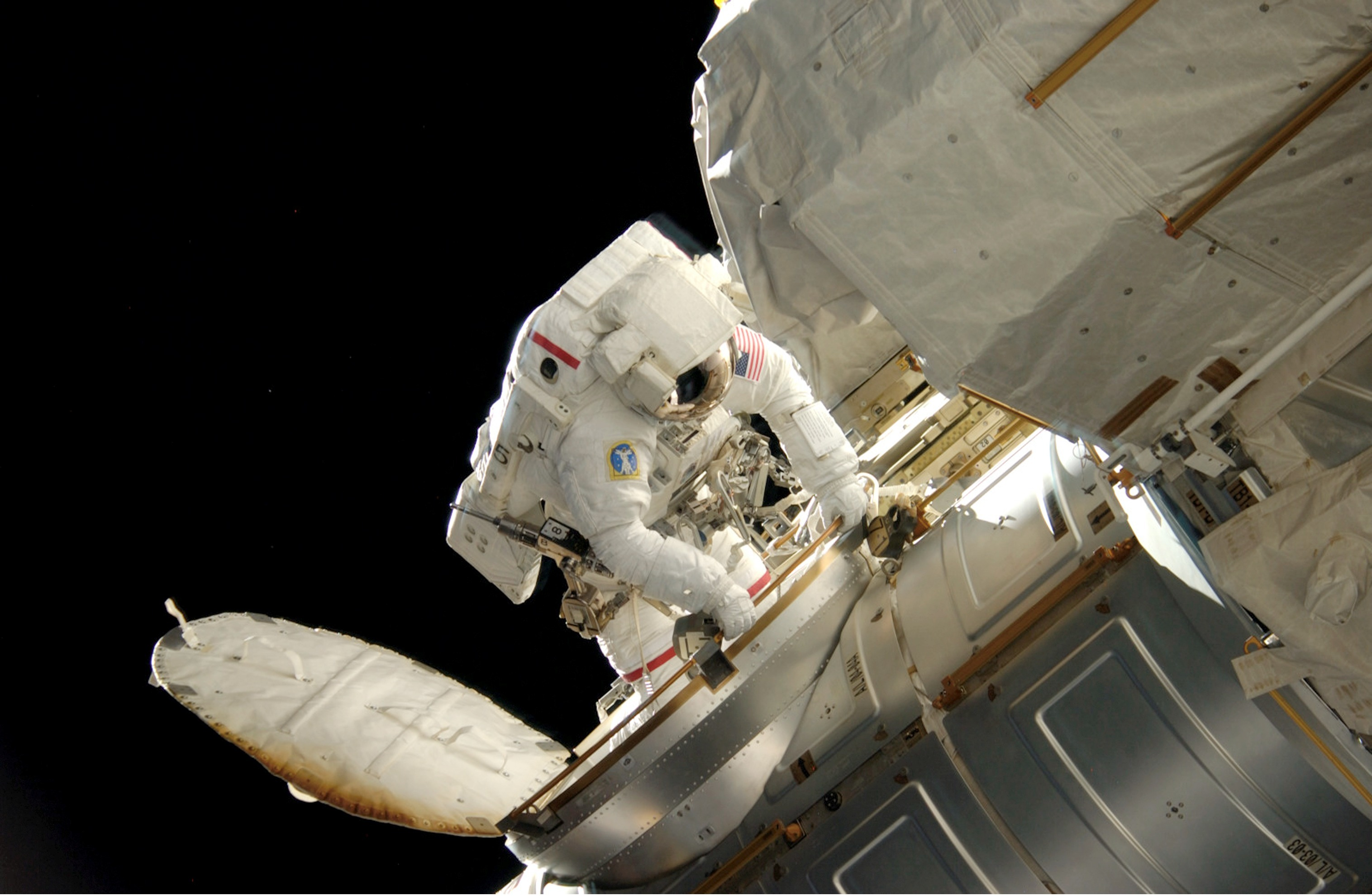
James Reilly enters the Quest Airlock at the conclusion of EVA 3

=== June 16 (Flight day 9) ===
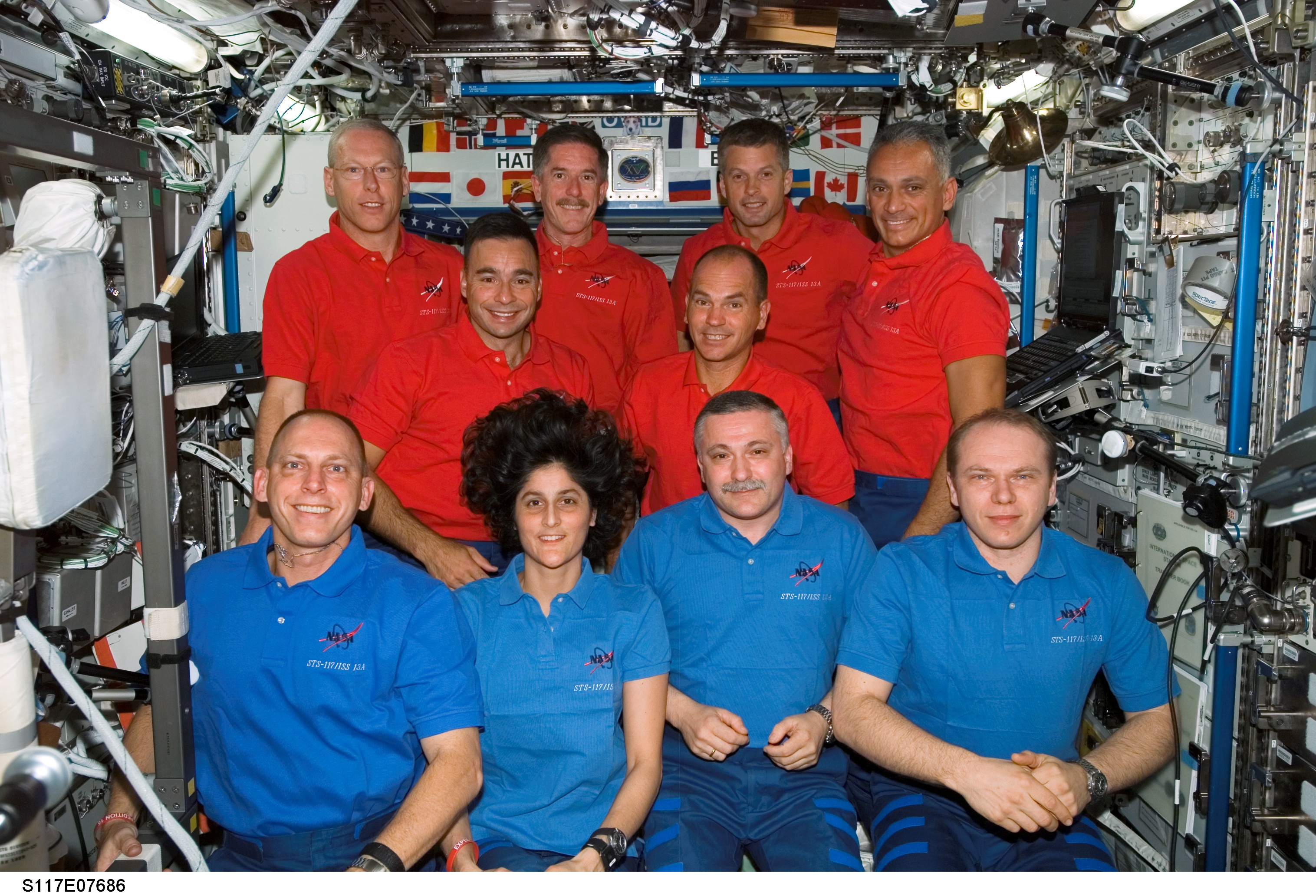
The shuttle and space station crew poses for a press photo.

I was just in the right place at the right time. It's an honor to be here.

— Astronaut Sunita Williams sets up a new space endurance record

The crew of Atlantis had a day of light duties. Earlier on the day Astronaut Sunita Williams set a new space endurance record for female astronauts. At 5:47 UTC on flight day 9, Mission Specialist Williams' time in space reached 188 days and 4 hours, matching the mark for the longest single spaceflight ever by a woman space traveler. That mark was set by Astronaut Shannon Lucid on her flight to the Mir space station in 1996. By coincidence, Williams also set the new record on the 44th anniversary of the launch of the first female space flyer Valentina Tereshkova in 1963.

Crew members spent time transferring supplies between ISS and Atlantis. Later on the day they reviewed the timeline for next day's spacewalk. Mission Specialists James Reilly, John Olivas, Steven Swanson and Patrick Forrester spent time working on the U.S. spacesuits. Olivas and Reilly finished their post-spacewalk spacesuit reconfiguration tasks, while Forrester and Swanson configured their suits and tools for EVA 4.

The shuttle and space station crew also spoke with reporters during a space-to-ground news conference.

Earlier in the day, flight controllers in Moscow issued commands to restart some systems in the Russian segment of the space station. During the day computer problems on the ISS were further resolved, with all six processors available (four online and two standby). Following the successful attempt to revive four channels on flight day 8 after bypassing what appeared to be a faulty power switch with external cabling, cosmonauts Fyodor Yurchikhin and Oleg Kotov repeated that same modification on the last two channels.

=== June 17 (Flight day 10 – EVA 4) ===
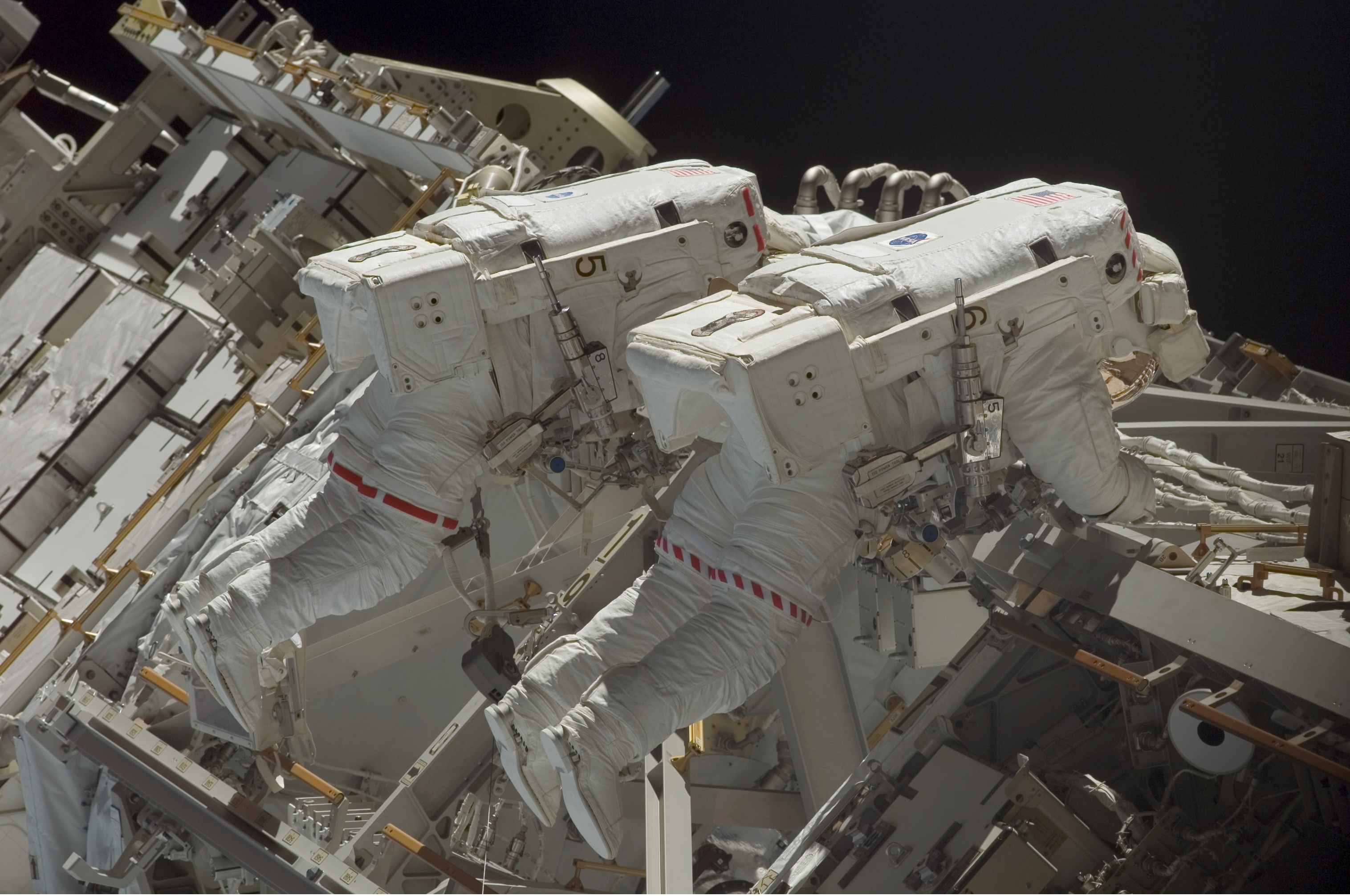
Mission specialists Patrick Forrester (left) and Steven Swanson participate in EVA 4.

The crew's wakeup call went up at 6:38 am CDT. Flight day 10 saw the successful completion of the mission's final spacewalk by Patrick Forrester and Steven Swanson.

The fourth spacewalk of STS-117 began at 16:25 UTC. Astronaut James Reilly choreographed the activity from Atlantis' flight deck shadowed by station Flight Engineer Oleg Kotov serving as the intravehicular crew member. EVA 4 was the 87th in support of station assembly and maintenance, 11th spacewalk completed in 2007, the 59th staged out of the ISS and the 36th out of the Quest airlock.

Swanson and Forrester retrieved a TV camera and its support structure from a stowage platform attached to the Quest Airlock and installed it on the S3 truss. They then verified the Drive Lock Assembly (DLA) 2 configuration and removed the last six SARJ launch restraints. The two astronauts cleared the path on the S3 truss for the Mobile Base System by removing temporary rail stops and hardware that had secured the S3/S4 truss segments in the shuttle's payload bay. The work completed the major tasks assigned for the STS-117 mission.

The pair then began some of the get-ahead tasks mission managers had hoped to complete. The two spacewalkers installed a computer network cable on the Unity node that was to permit astronauts in the U.S. segment of the station to command systems in the Russian segment and opened the Hydrogen vent valve on the Destiny laboratory installed by Mission Specialist James Reilly during EVA 3. Swanson and Forrester also attempted to bolt down two debris shield panels that could not be put back in place during an earlier spacewalk. since the two were also not able to get it anchored, they tethered the panels on the space station's service module.

Overnight, ground controllers planned to test the SARJ, ordering a small 5-degree rotation just to verify normal operations. Throughout flight day 10, the Russian central computer and terminal computers continued in stable operation.

=== June 18 (Flight day 11 – Off-duty) ===
STS-117 crew got up looking ahead to time off duty during the first half of flight day 11. The astronauts hauled the last bits of cargo between the shuttle and the space station while flight controllers on Earth tested the station's resuscitated Russian control and navigation computers after they crashed last week. In the morning the shuttle maneuvered the Atlantis/ISS complex into position for a water and waste water dump and after it maneuvered back, attitude control was switched to and from Russian command successfully.

Atlantis was given a green light for undocking on flight day 12. Expedition 15 and Atlantis's crew said Farewells and sealed the hatches between the shuttle and the ISS.

=== June 19 (Flight day 12 – Undocking) ===
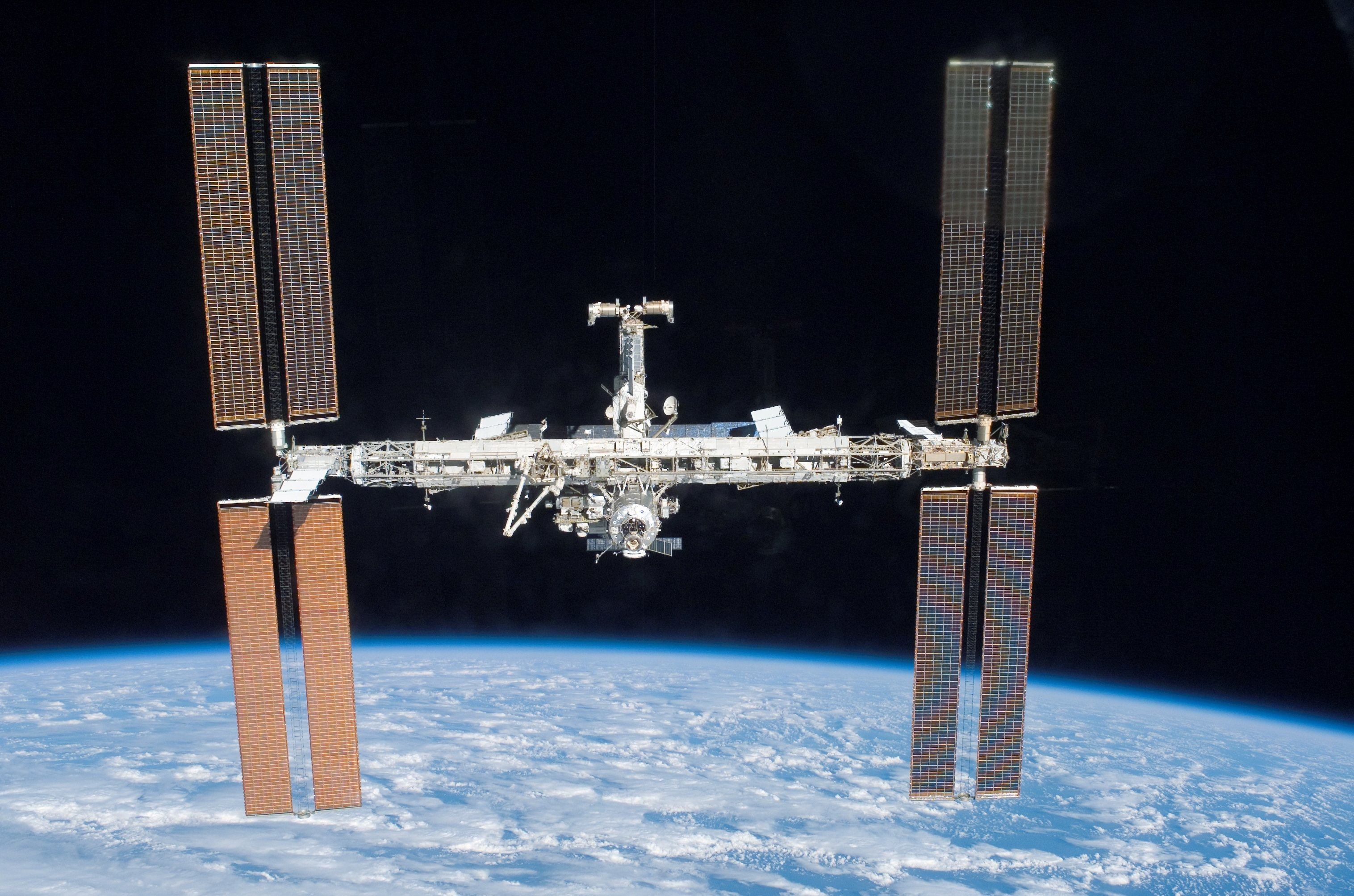
The International Space Station after completion of STS-117.

The astronauts on Atlantis woke up to begin flight day 12 with the hatch to the space station closed.

At 12:45 UTC Pilot Archambault and Mission Specialist Patrick Forrester began powering on shuttle systems that have been turned off to conserve power during the docked phase of the mission. At 13:28 UTC, Mission Specialists Steven Swanson and James Reilly installed the centerline camera in the Orbiter Docking System.

At 9:42 am the hooks and latches holding Atlantis and ISS together were released, and the shuttle undocked from the Space Station as the two spacecraft were flying above New Guinea. Atlantis was docked to the station for 8 days and 19 hours. Pilot Lee Archambault took control of Atlantis shortly after undocking and fired shuttle thrusters to move 450 feet (140 m) in front of the ISS before starting a full fly around at 15:07 UTC. Crew members on both the ISS and shuttle got photos of both spacecraft as Atlantis performed the fly around and once it was complete, the shuttle left of the vicinity of the station complex.

During the separation, a camera in the cargo of Atlantis' bay observed numerous objects what could have been harmless pieces of ice and one much larger, more distinct piece of debris slowly floating away. It was not clear whether the objects originated from the shuttle or the space station. Around 21:30 UTC, Commander Sturckow reported yet another piece of debris leaving the area of Atlantis. Sturckow identified them to the mission control in Houston as "little phenolic-looking, kind of tan-looking washers with four slots" that are used to tie down the Multi-Layer Insulation blankets in the payload bay.

Later in the day, Pilot Archambault, Mission Specialists Forrester and Swanson used the shuttle's robot arm to lift the Orbiter Boom Sensor System to conduct a late inspection of the thermal protection system on both wings and the orbiter's nose cap.

During the day, Astronaut Sunita Williams, in the 192nd day of her spaceflight, did more exercise to help prepare her to gravity back on Earth.

=== June 20 (Flight day 13) ===
Atlantis did various hardware tests to prepare for a landing on June 21, 2007, and the crew had an interview with several large TV networks.

=== June 21 (Flight day 14 – Scrubbed landing) ===
Atlantis closed its payload bay doors and made various preparations for landing, but had to stay in orbit after both landing opportunities at Kennedy Space Center were scrubbed due to bad weather conditions.

=== June 22 (Flight day 15 – Landing) ===
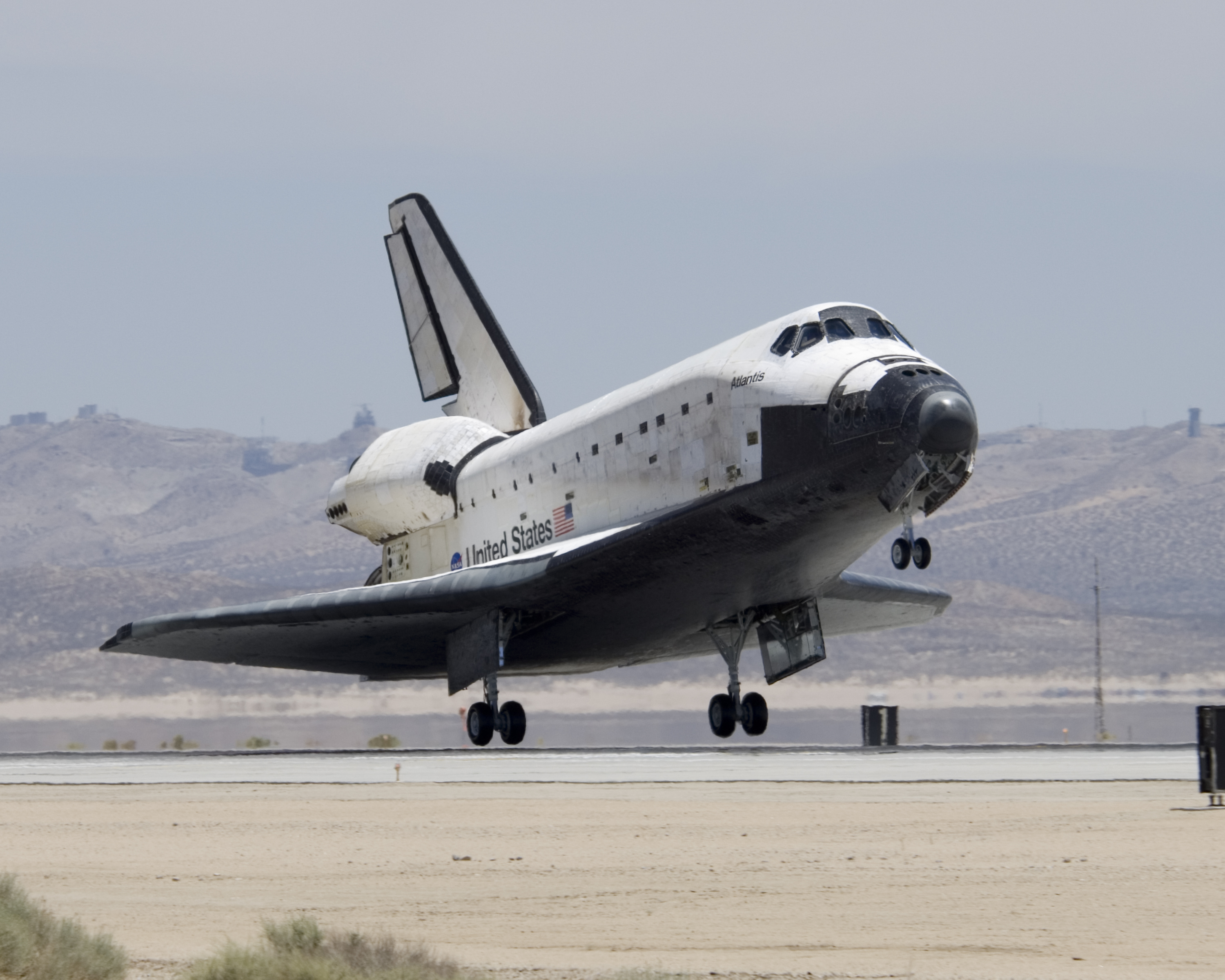
Atlantis lands on Runway 22 at Edwards AFB at the end of STS-117.

Flight day 15 saw Space Shuttle Atlantis returned to Earth after a successful mission to the Space Station.

Earlier in the day, the flight controllers kept a close eye on weather. Atlantis again closed its payload bay doors and made preparations for landing. Atlantis had five opportunities to land (two at Kennedy Space Center, three at Edwards Air Force Base, California). The first and second landing attempts on Orbit 218 and 219 in Florida were scrubbed due to showers, thunderstorms and low clouds at Kennedy Space Center. So flight controllers took their first chance at Edwards Air Force Base, where weather was ideal for the landing.

Flying upside down and backward over the Indian Ocean, the deorbit burn was initiated by Commander Rick Sturckow and Pilot Lee Archambault. They fired Atlantis' twin OMS Pods at 18:43:47 UTC for 2 minutes and 33 seconds, slowing the ship by about 200 mph. This was enough to drop the shuttle into the atmosphere for an hour-long glide back to Earth.

As the shuttle descended through 50,000 feet (15,000 m), Commander Sturckow took over manual control and guided Atlantis successfully to land on Runway 22 at Edwards Air Force Base at 19:49:38 UTC. Flight surgeons were standing by to assist astronaut Sunita Williams, who made the trip back to Earth resting on her back in a recumbent seat bolted to the floor of the shuttle's lower deck. During her long duration flight Williams spent 194 days, 18 hours, 58 minutes in space.

Atlantis made 219 orbits and covered 5.8 million miles during the flight. A welcoming ceremony for the crew's return to Houston was held on June 23 at NASA Hangar 276 at Ellington Field.

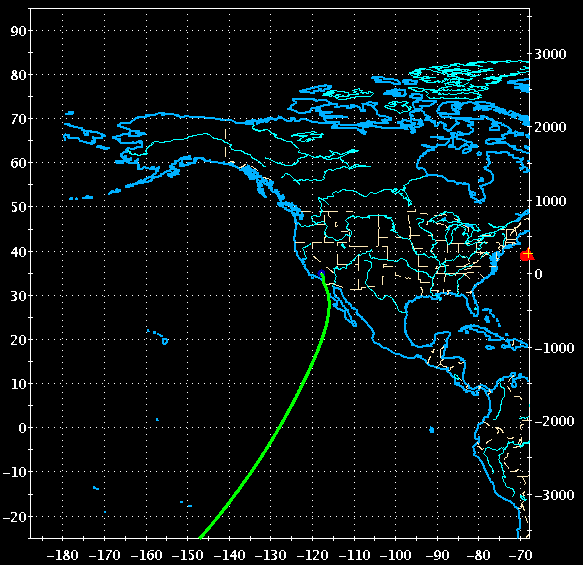
Long range ground track

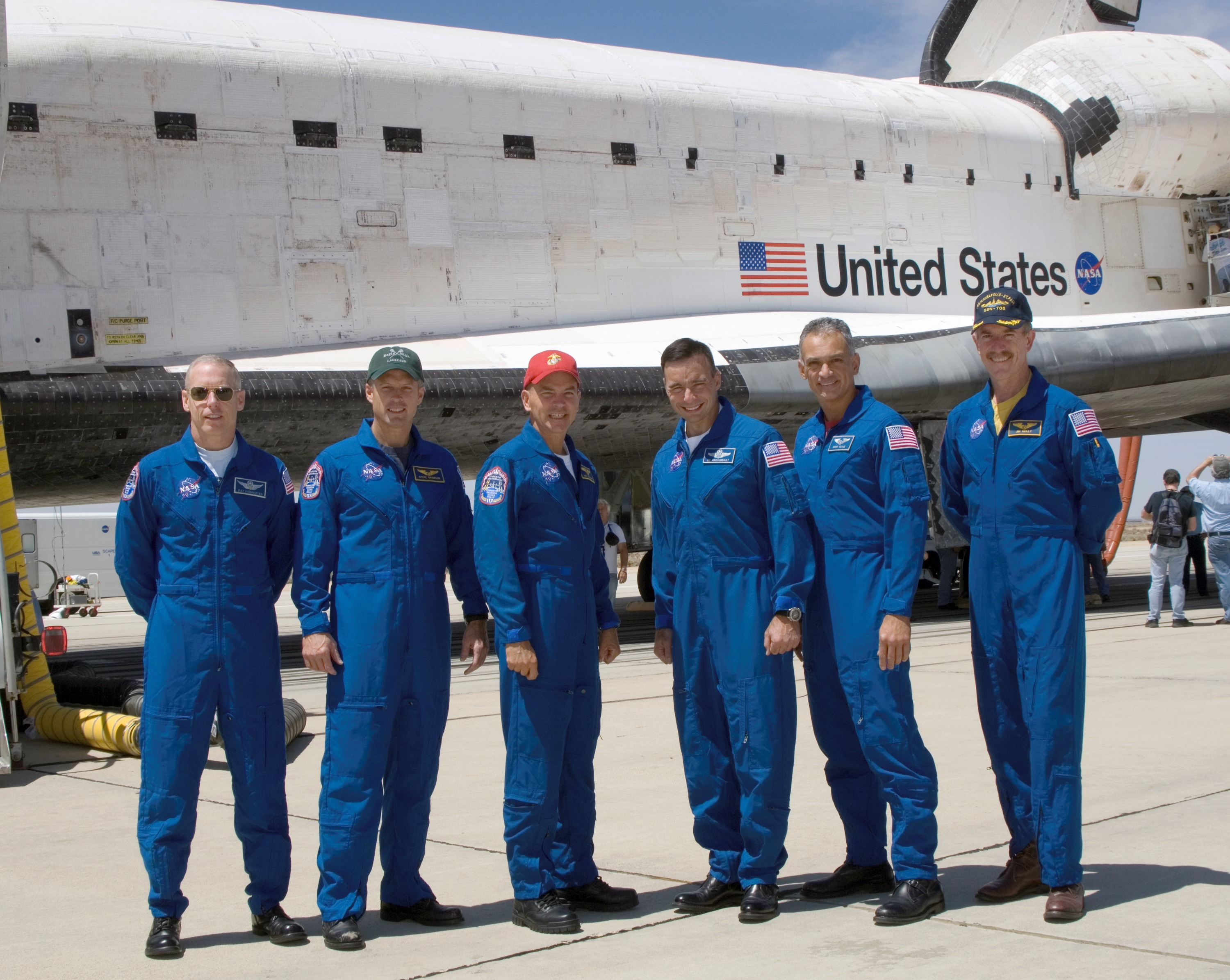
STS-117 crew pose for a picture after landing

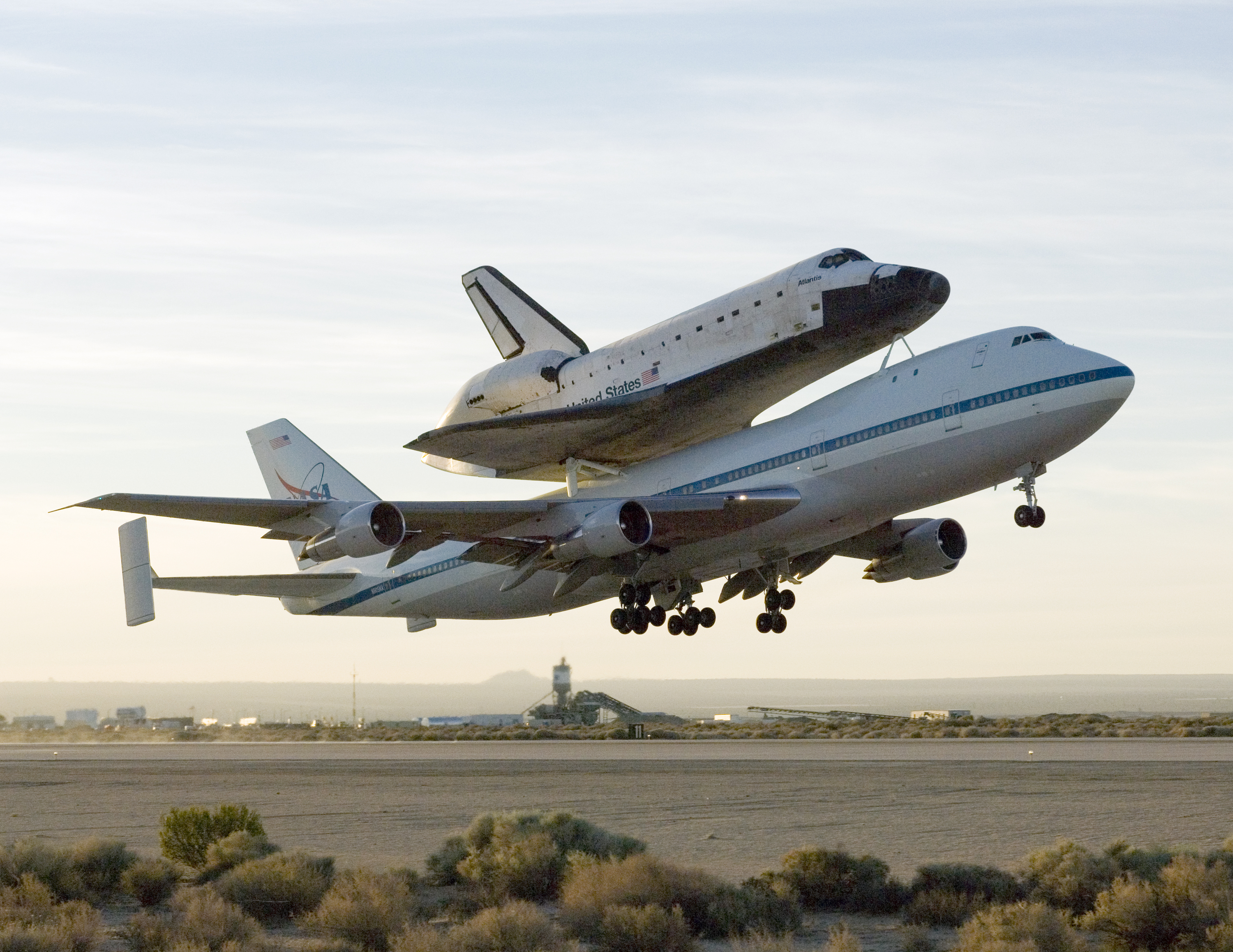
Atlantis being ferried back to Florida after landing in California

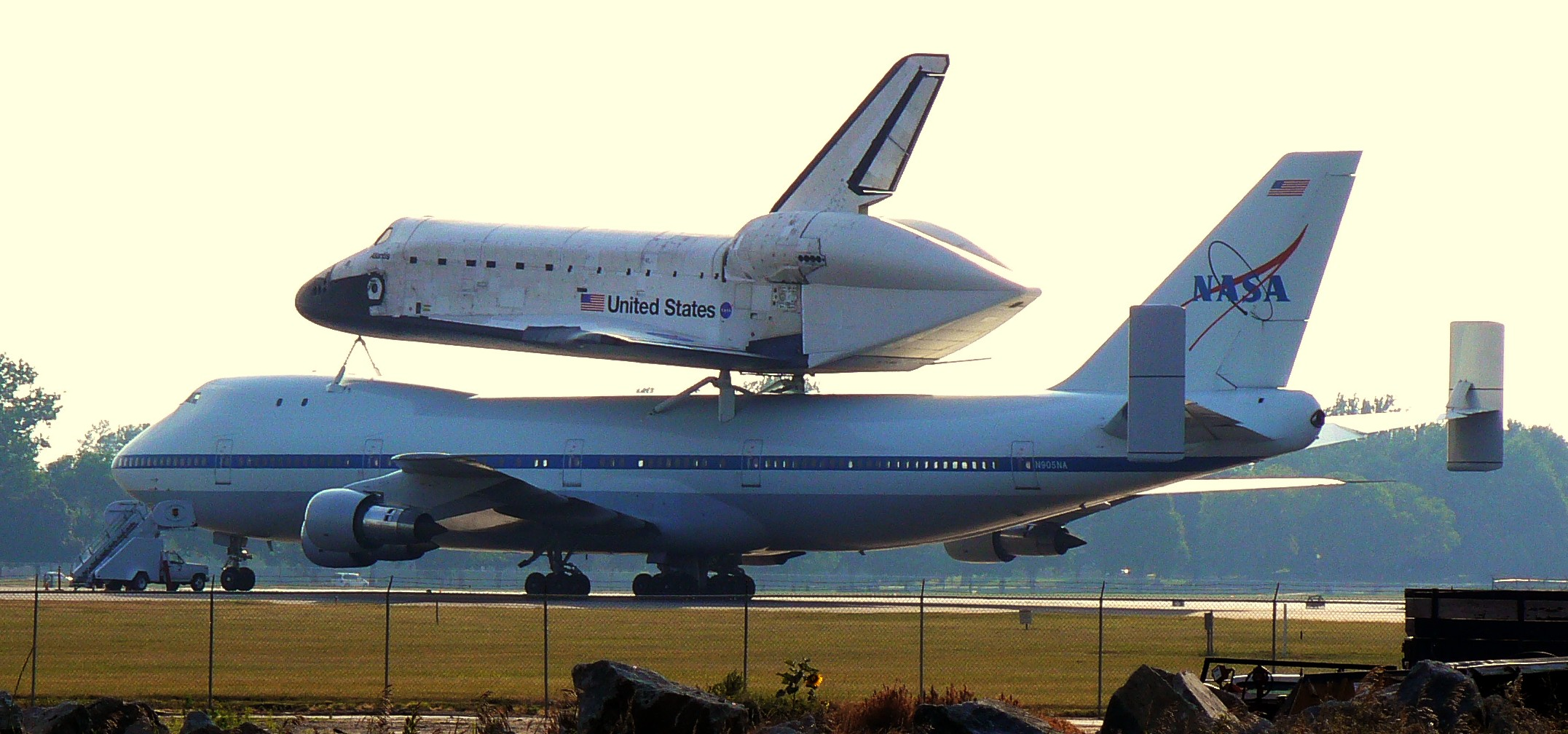
Atlantis at a refuel stop at Offutt Air Force Base, Omaha, Nebraska

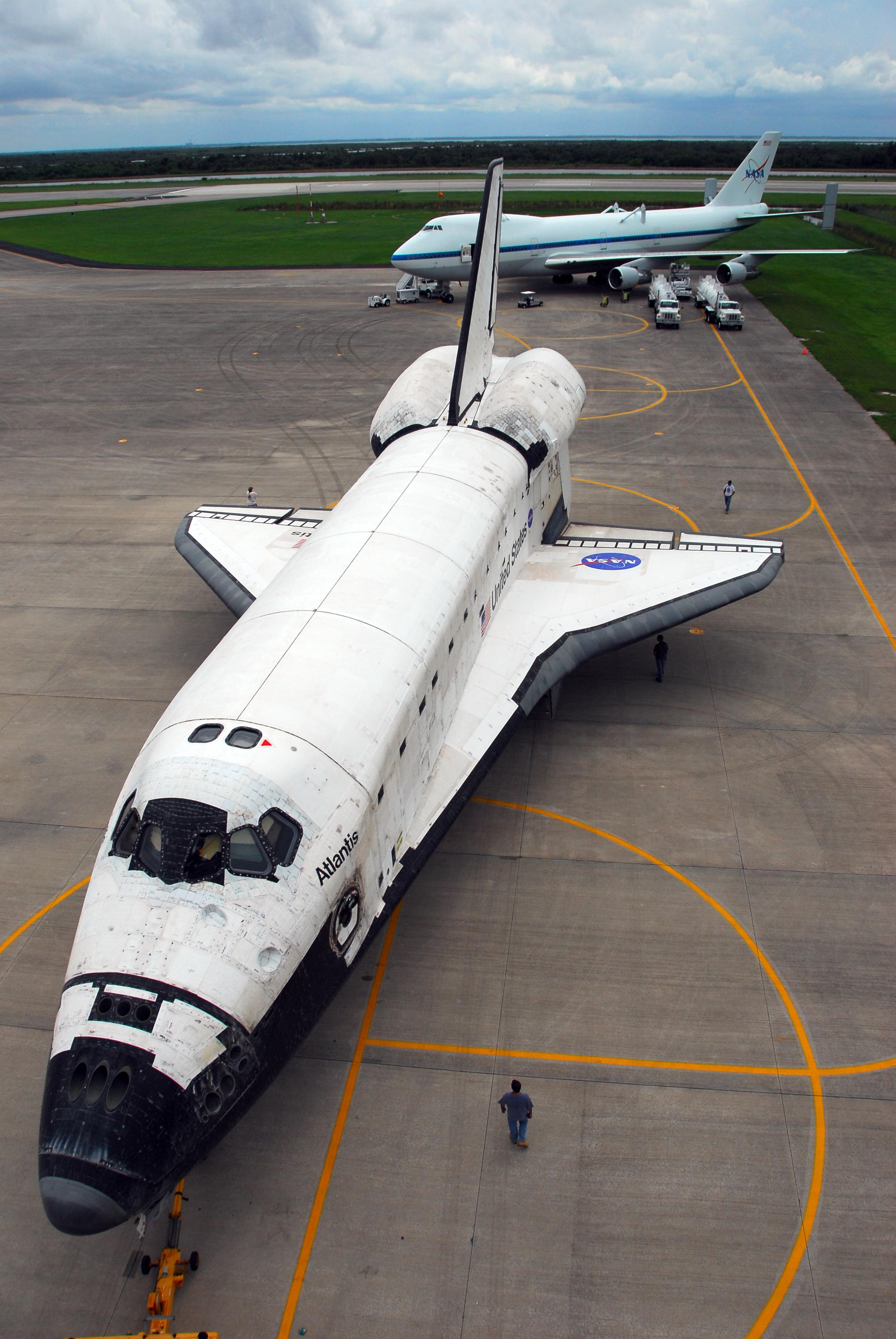
Atlantis is towed back to the Orbiter Processing Facility to be prepared for STS-122

== Spacewalks ==
EVA	Spacewalkers	Start (UTC)	End	Duration
EVA 1	James F. Reilly; John D. Olivas	June 11, 2007; 20:02	June 12, 2007; 02:17	6 hours 15 minutes
EVA 1	Reilly and Olivas released the launch restraints on the S4 four Solar Array Blanket Boxes. They installed a rotary joint drive-lock assembly (DLA-1) and released latches allowing a folding radiator panel to extend as required.			
EVA 2	Patrick G. Forrester; Steven Swanson	June 13, 2007; 18:28	June 14, 2007; 01:44	7 hours 16 minutes
EVA 2	Forrester and Swanson removed all of the launch locks holding the 10-foot (3.0 m)-wide solar alpha rotary joint in place. Forrester tried to install a drive-lock assembly (DLA 2) and found that commands being sent to it were actually being received by DLA 1. The spacewalkers also helped to partly retract the P6 solar array. They were able to poke and prod five and a half bays worth of panels into folding correctly.			
EVA 3	James F. Reilly; John D. Olivas	June 15, 2007; 17:24	June 16, 2007; 01:22	7 hours 58 minutes
EVA 3	Olivas spent the first two hours using a surgical stapler from the Shuttle medical kit to staple and pin down a thermal blanket on Atlantis' OMS pod and Reilly installed a Hydrogen vent valve of the new oxygen generation system on the Destiny laboratory. When those tasks were completed, Reilly and Olivas provided hands-on assistance to retract the P6 solar array into its protective box.			
EVA 4	Patrick G. Forrester; Steven Swanson	June 16, 2007; 16:25	June 16, 2007; 22:54	6 hours 29 minutes
EVA 4	Swanson and Forrester retrieved a TV camera and its support structure from a stowage platform. They then verified the Drive Lock Assembly (DLA) 2 configuration and removed the last six SARJ launch restraints. The two astronauts also installed a computer network cable on the Unity node, opened the hydrogen vent valve on the Destiny laboratory, and tethered two orbital debris shield panels on the station's service module.			

== Wake-up calls ==
In what has become a tradition for NASA spaceflights since the days of Gemini, the crew of STS-117 is played a special musical track at the start of each day in space. Each track is specially chosen and often has a particular meaning to an individual member of the crew, or it is somehow applicable to their situation.

Flight Day	Song	Artist	Played for	Links
Day 2	"Big Boy Toys"	Aaron Tippin	Rick Sturckow	wav mp3 transcript
Day 3	"Riding the Sky"	David Kelldorf and Brad Loveall (both employed at Johnson Space Center)	Clayton Anderson	wav mp3 transcript
Day 4	"It Probably Always Will"	Ozark Mountain Daredevils	Steven Swanson	wav mp3 transcript
Day 5	"What a Wonderful World"	Louis Armstrong	John "Danny" Olivas	wav mp3 transcript
Day 6	"Questions 67 and 68"	Chicago	Lee Archambault	wav mp3 transcript
Day 7	"Indescribable"	Chris Tomlin	Patrick Forrester	wav mp3 transcript
Day 8	"Radar Love"	Golden Earring	Steven Swanson	wav mp3 transcript
Day 9	"University of Texas El Paso Fight Song"	UTEP	John "Danny" Olivas	wav mp3 transcript
Day 10	Theme song from "Band of Brothers"		James Reilly	wav mp3 transcript
Day 11	"Redeemer"	Nicole C. Mullen	Patrick Forrester	wav mp3 transcript
Day 12	"Feelin' Stronger Every Day"	Chicago	Lee Archambault	wav mp3 transcript
Day 13	"If I Had a Million Dollars"	Barenaked Ladies	Sunita Williams	wav mp3 transcript
Day 14	"Makin' Good Time Coming Home"	John Arthur Martinez	Rick Sturckow and Jim Reilly	wav mp3 transcript
Day 15	"The Marines' Hymn"	The Marine Corps Band	Rick Sturckow	wav mp3 transcript

== Mission insignia ==
STS-117 crew patch symbolizes the continued construction of the space station and ongoing human presence in space. The ISS is shown orbiting high above the Earth. Gold is used to highlight the portion of the ISS that will be installed by the STS-117 crew. The names of the STS-117 crew are located above and below the orbiting outpost. The two gold astronaut office symbols, emanating from the '117' at the bottom of the patch, represent the concerted efforts of the Space Shuttle and space station programs toward the completion of the station. The orbiter and unfurled banner of red, white, and blue represent the renewed patriotism of the American Nation as they continue to explore the universe.

== Contingency planning ==
=== STS-317 ===
STS-317 was the designation given to the Contingency Shuttle Crew Support mission which would have been launched in the event Space Shuttle Discovery became disabled during STS-116. It would have been a modified version of the STS-117 mission, which would have involved the launch date being brought forward. If needed, it would have launched no earlier than February 21, 2007. The crew for this mission would have been a 4-person subset of the full STS-117 crew.

== Incorrect press reports of accident ==
On June 9, 2007, the French news agency Agence France-Presse (AFP) reported that Atlantis had exploded shortly after take-off. The information circulated on their wire for a number of minutes, and appeared on a number of websites including Libération and Romandie News. It was later reported that AFP had prepared this sort of bulletin for every shuttle launch since the 1986 Space Shuttle Challenger disaster and accidentally published it. This is equivalent to accidental automated press releases in the past, such as the infamous case of NBC erroneously reporting baseball player Joe DiMaggio's death in 1999, about six weeks before his actual death.

== See also ==
- 2007 in spaceflight
- List of human spaceflights
- List of International Space Station spacewalks
- List of Space Shuttle missions
- Lists of spacewalks and moonwalks
