= Made in America (Jay-Z and Kanye West song) =

Song by Jay Z and Kanye West featuring Frank Ocean

from the album Watch the Throne
- Recorded: 2011
- Genre: Hip hop; R&B
- Length: 4:52
- Label: Roc-A-Fella; Roc Nation; Def Jam
- Songwriters: Kanye West; Shawn Carter; Christopher Breaux; Mike Dean; Joseph Roach
- Producers: Shama "Sak Pase" Joseph; Mike Dean

"Made in America" is a song by American hip hop recording artists Kanye West and Jay Z, from their collaborative album Watch the Throne (2011). It is the eleventh track on the album and features vocals from singer Frank Ocean. Lyrically, the song explores themes of family life and the American Dream. It expresses the hardships of youth and coming of age.

The track received positive reviews from music critics who praised Ocean's vocal hook, and the subject matter of the verses. The song has been compared to "inspirational ballads of late-period Michael Jackson." The song charted on South Korea Gaon International Chart at number 178. Jay Z and West performed the song at their 2011 Watch the Throne Tour.

== Background ==
Jay Z and Kanye West are both American rappers who have collaborated on several tracks together. In 2010, they began production and recording on a collaborative record Watch the Throne. Frank Ocean is an R&B singer who released his debut mixtape Nostalgia, Ultra in early 2011 to critical acclaim. The release of the mixtape interested West, who was reported to be a big fan. West invited Ocean to write and sing on two of the songs from the record. Frank wrote and provided vocals on tracks "No Church in the Wild" and "Made in America" and the songs were recorded in New York.

== Composition ==
"Made in America"
A sample of the track containing the closing lines of Ocean's hook and the start of West's verse, discussing his mother and fame.

The song has been described as an "understated soft-pop" track with influence from Michael Jackson and the 1985 charity single "We Are the World". Ocean's hook "pays tribute to Martin Luther King Jr., Coretta Scott King, Malcolm X, Betty Shabazz and, of course, the sweet baby Jesus on the album's most serene track." Rob Harvilla of Spin stated that "PBR&B prince Frank Ocean" sings on the "subdued but triumphant "Made in America" (wherein Jay wistfully recalls his grandma's banana pudding and Kanye complains about South Park). The song "invokes heroes of the civil rights movement" and reflects on how West and Jay have "seized what might be an American Dream."

Jay Z muses on his drug-dealing past with lines like "our apple pie was supplied by Arm & Hammer", utilizing "his skill at baking double- and triple-meanings into a line". West's verse describes his "original hustle in terms of blogging and web traffic" and his conflict with fame, "tinged with a political or socio-economic hue." West offers a verse that "starts off humble, but by the end he's bragging about his power and slamming his critics" over a "weirdly magnetic synthetic beat and dots of pretty piano clusters crafted by producer Sak Pace of the Jugganauts." Popdust reported that "this is Jay at his most vulnerable, revealing things he may be thinking but not regularly willing to share with others. While the song's chorus seems to honor all of those "Made In America," the track is really a look at the history these two have shared and perhaps their differing futures."

== Reception ==
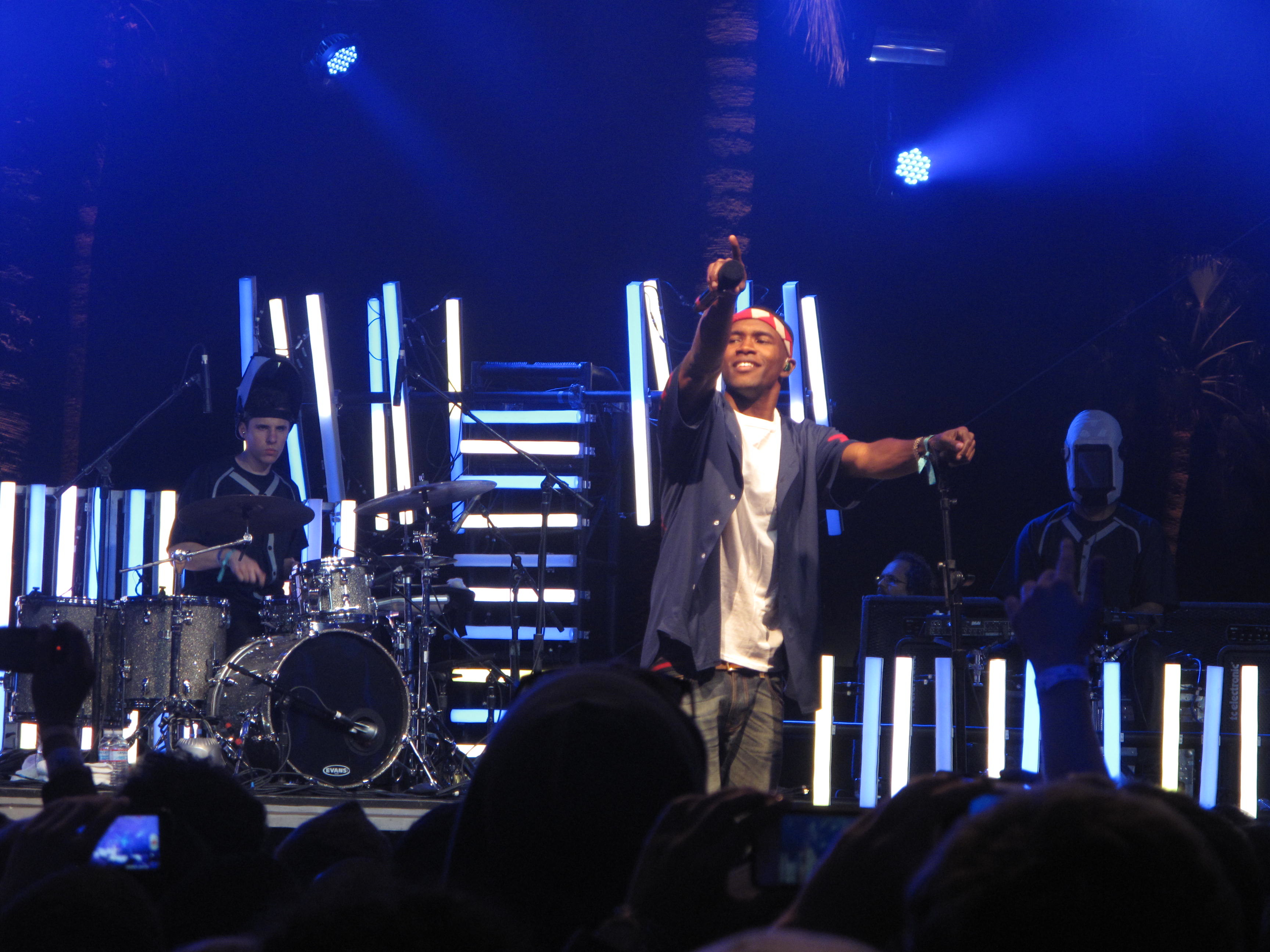
Ocean's hook received the most praise of any aspect of the song, being described as the "emotional weight" of the track.

"Made in America" received mostly positive reviews from most music critics. Pitchfork's Tom Breihan commented that the track reminded him of "the inspirational ballads of late-period Michael Jackson", and said that while the song was "silly", it "succeeds on pure orchestral excess." Rolling Stone stated that "both rappers deliver sentimental verses, but Ocean carries most of the emotional weight here." Steve Jones of USA Today commented "on the equally potent Made in America, the two talk about their rises to fame, while acknowledging those who helped and inspired them." Sputnikmusic's Tyler Fisher noted that "Frank Ocean asks, "What's a god to a nonbeliever?" on "No Church in the Wild", but later invokes "sweet baby Jesus" on "Made in America", pandering to each track without a thought to the coherence of the album."

Los Angeles Times writer Randall Roberts stated "the album's highlight, and an instant classic, is "Made in America," a solid, slow-paced Frank Ocean-teamed jam about the American dream that reveals the main difference between West and Jay Z: humility." Popdust writer Emily Exton that while "Frank Ocean's "Sweet Baby Jesus" might be stuck in your head for the rest of the day", the highlist is "Kanye who manages to both appreciatively give thanks to his rise to fame as well as generate more than one eye roll with his bravado." Rolling Stone's Simon Vozick-Levinson mused "Frank Ocean's second appearance on the album is another keeper. Hip-hop heads will be singing his honey-voiced, religiously-themed hook all fall. Jay Z and Kanye keep the thoughtful mood going with verses that revisit their respective rises to fame." BBC Music's Marcus J. Moore perceived that "Made in America fails to resonate because of a contrived chorus that pays homage to West's Sweet Baby Jesus, among others." Andy Gill of The Independent found it to be a stand-out track, "featuring assured vocal refrains from Frank Ocean, while the two rappers muse over familiar themes of loyalty, sexuality and maternal solidarity." The track briefly charted on the South Korea Gaon International Chart for one week at number 178.

== Promotion ==
The track was performed by West and Jay Z on their Watch the Throne Tour. Ocean performed his hook of the song at some of the performances during his 2011 concert series through the United States and Europe. The name was adopted for Jay Z's first annual Budweiser Made in America Festival at Fairmount Park in Philadelphia in September 2012. Jay Z served as the curator and the headliner for the festival.

== Charts ==
Chart (2011)	Peak position
South Korean Gaon Chart	178
