= Welcome to the Jungle (Jay-Z and Kanye West song) =

2011 song by The Throne

Song by Jay-Z and Kanye West

from the album Watch the Throne
- Released: August 8, 2011
- Recorded: 2011
- Studio: Tribeca Grand Hotel (NYC); (The Mercer) Hotel (New York)
- Genre: Hip-hop
- Length: 2:54
- Label: Roc-A-Fella; Roc Nation; Def Jam
- Songwriters: Kanye West; Shawn Carter; Kasseem Dean; Mike Dean
- Producer: Swizz Beatz

"Welcome to the Jungle" is a song by the American rappers Jay-Z and Kanye West from their collaborative studio album, Watch the Throne (2011). The song features additional vocals from Swizz Beatz and Acapella Soul. It was produced by Swizz Beatz, who served as a co-writer with West, Jay-Z, and Mike Dean. The rappers engaged in recording sessions with the producer for the song at The Mercer Hotel in 2011. A hip-hop song, it features a simplistic beat with rock elements.

Lyrically, Jay-Z touches on his personal losses and overcoming struggles on the song. Jay-Z makes a lyrical reference to Guns N' Roses' song of the same name and West contributes few vocals, discussing the problems of his environment in his performance. "Welcome to the Jungle" received generally positive reviews from music critics, who mostly highlighted Jay-Z's rapping and placed focus on his lyricism. Some complimented the production and it was named as one of the best songs of 2011 by Rolling Stone, though a few critics were negative towards Swizz Beatz's vocals. In the United States, the song peaked at number four on the Billboard Bubbling Under R&B/Hip-Hop Singles chart. Jay-Z and West performed it during their Watch the Throne Tour (2011–2012).

== Background and composition ==
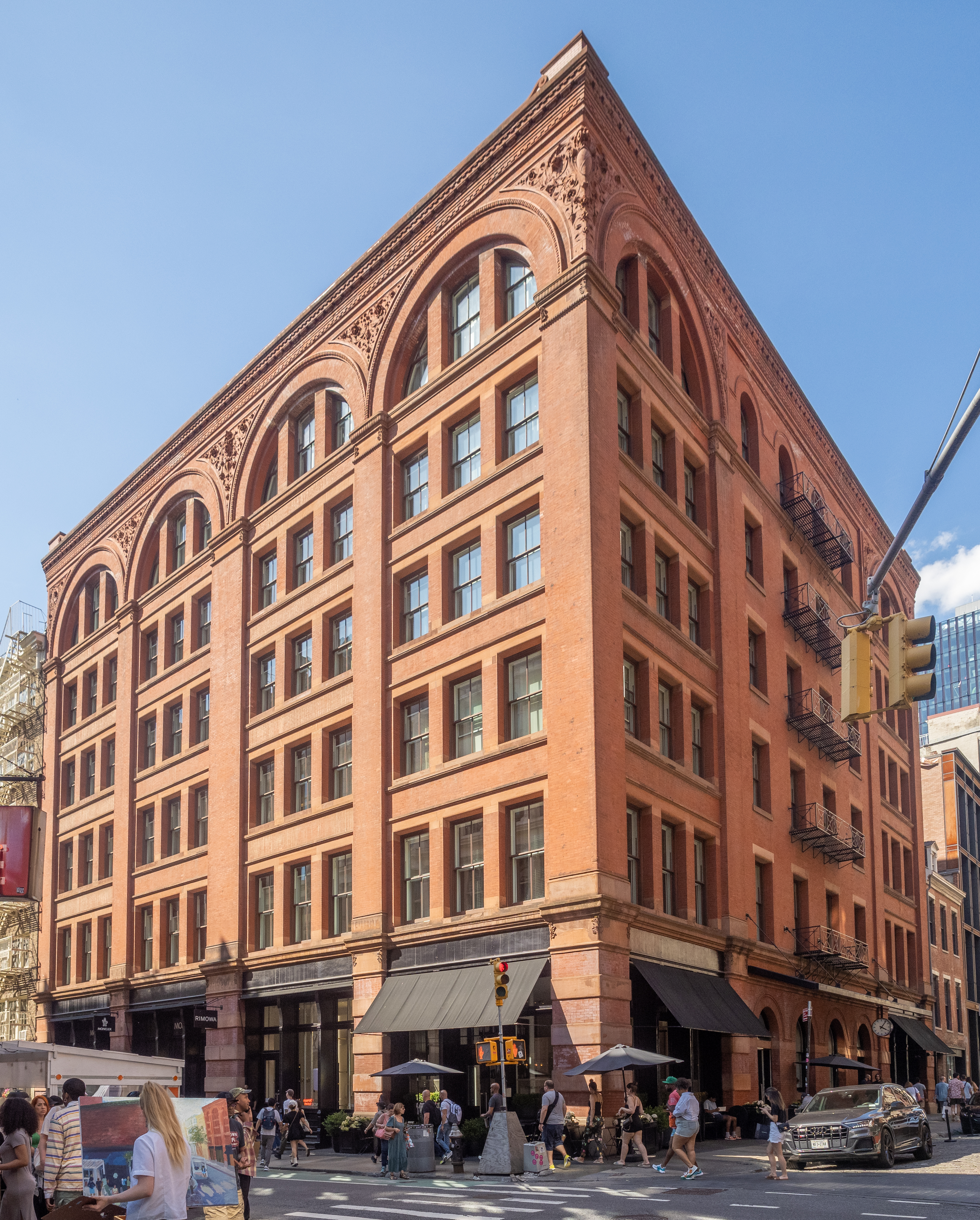
The Mercer Hotel, where Jay-Z and West recorded for the song with its producer Swizz Beatz.

Jay-Z and West are both American rappers who have collaborated on several tracks together, such as the singles "Swagga Like Us" (2008), "Run This Town" (2009), and "Monster" (2010). In 2010, the rappers began production and recording together for a collaborative record titled Watch the Throne. Record producer Swizz Beatz compared working with Jay-Z and West to being in the studio with Quincy Jones and Michael Jackson at the same time. Swizz Beatz explained that despite the majority of people not feeling the same way, this comparison would be made in hip-hop history within 10 to 15 years. The producer recorded with Jay-Z and West during their sessions at The Mercer Hotel in SoHo, Manhattan for Watch the Throne in 2011. The rappers and Swizz Beatz co-wrote the song with Mike Dean.

Musically, "Welcome to the Jungle" is a hip-hop song. The song features a simplistic, abrasive beat that incorporates elements of rock music. Mournful synths enter at the point of West's performance, alongside Swizz Beatz's groove. The song also contains the producer's signature snares, Dean's keys, and additional instruments from Ken Lewis. It includes a short outro, which is used on others tracks of the album. Additional vocals are contributed from Swizz Beatz and Acapella Soul, with the former delivering the ad-lib "Welcome to the jungle, well?"

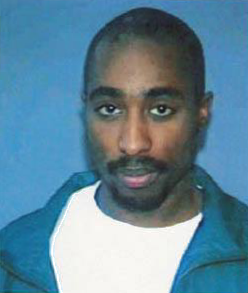
Jay-Z pays tribute to multiple deceased rappers in his verses on the song, including Tupac Shakur.

In the lyrics of "Welcome to the Jungle", Jay-Z discusses personal losses and overcoming his struggles as he admits to experiencing depression. Jay-Z details the impact of his uncle and father's deaths, recalling the pain left him paralyzed. He begins a verse with a description of the death of Tupac Shakur, as well as paying tribute to fellow rappers Pimp C and the Notorious B.I.G.. Jay-Z also references Jackson's death: "Rest in peace to the leader of the Jackson 5". Despite sharing the title of hard rock band Guns N' Roses' single "Welcome to the Jungle", the song does not sample it or have a similar sound, although Jay-Z describes himself as "black Axl Rose" in reference to the lead vocalist. Contributing few vocals to the song, West mostly addresses his problems faced from the environment around him, rather than focusing on himself. He references André 3000's story from rap group Outkast's "Da Art of Storytellin' (Pt. 1)" of asking a girl during their teenage years where she wanted to be when she grew up and her answering by saying alive in the introduction, rapping that he received this answer after asking a female where she wanted to be aged 25.

== Release and promotion ==
On August 8, 2011, "Welcome to the Jungle" was included as the eighth track on Jay-Z and West's collaborative studio album Watch The Throne, released by their record labels Def Jam, Roc Nation, and Roc-A-Fella. During the rappers' Watch the Throne Tour that ran from 2011 until 2012, they performed the song. Jay-Z and West performed it for Samsung Galaxy's South by Southwest concert at the Austin Music Hall in Austin, Texas on March 12, 2014, accompanied by a 12-foot video cube at the center of the stage. The performance generated heavy cheers for the crowd and Jay-Z responded by telling them, "Oh, we're just getting started."

== Reception ==
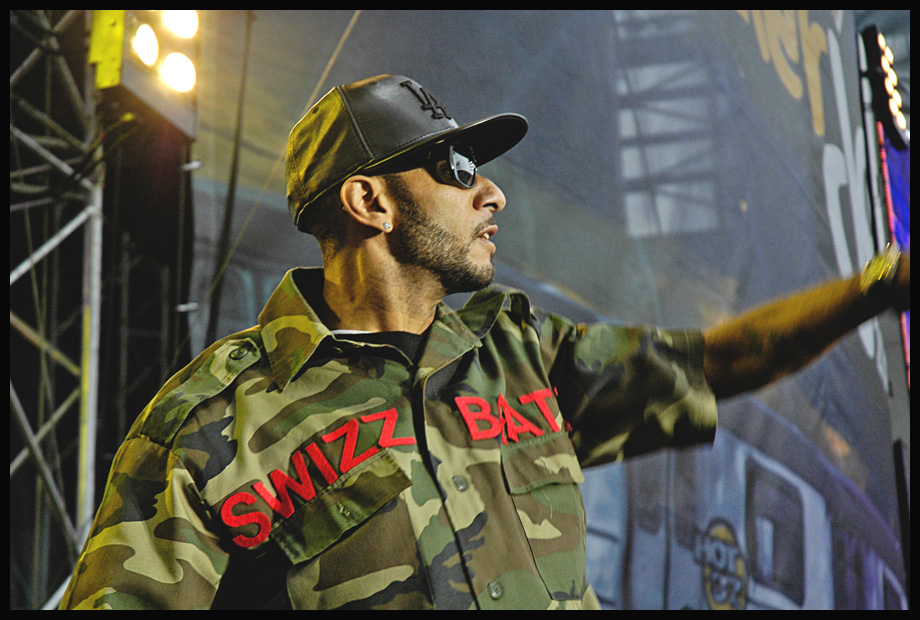
While Swizz Beatz's production work on the song was highlighted, a few reviewers criticized his vocals, particularly for usage of ad-libs.

"Welcome to the Jungle" was met with general acclaim from music critics, with Jay-Z's performance mostly garnering praise. Ranking it as the 20th best song of 2011, Rolling Stone staff asserted that Jay-Z compares himself to Rose over Swizz Beatz's "groove that slams like a hip-hop GnR". In Cokemachineglow, Calum Marsh called the song an unexpected album highlight for the rapper's "disarmingly introspective therapy session verse" that, combined with synths invoking "Assault on Precinct 13 (2003), surpasses its "chest-beating seriousness". Jesal "Jay Soul" Padania from RapReviews saw its "societal subject matter" as a highlight of Watch the Throne, hailing how Swizz Beatz returns the excitement of his teenage years with an "unstoppable and insistent beat" for Jay-Z's impressive lyricism. Writing for American Songwriter, Matt Popkin praised his Rose reference and Swizz Beatz's "trademark stuttering snares". Brian Josephs of Complex named the song as the 13th best out of the 16 on the album and he felt that despite the producer's ad-libs being the "glue at the center of this b-boy bop", Jay-Z dominates with his biographical lyricism across two emotional verses. Rolling Stone's Matthew Perpetua observed that as a consolation for it not sounding like Guns N' Roses' "Welcome to the Jungle", he mentions Rose "over a jittery, treble-heavy Swizz Beatz production". At Urb, James Shahan commended the song's strength for its "quasi-rock Swizz Beats score" with some of Jay-Z and West's best lyrical performances from their separate sources of struggle; the former's comes from himself and the latter's from what has happened in his environment. Tom Breihan from Pitchfork highlighted the rapper, "never a tortured pop star", admitting to being depressed as an example of "address[ing] matters beyond their bank accounts" on the album. The New York Times journalist Jon Caramanica found Jay-Z's pain to be "deeply ingrained", discussing the deaths of family that affected him. Steve Jones of USA Today picked the song as one from the album to download, saying that the rapper addresses his own losses and struggles. In PopMatters, David Amidon lauded how the song alludes to "raw New Yorkian street rap" such as Nas' "Made You Look" (2002).

Providing a mixed review for Entertainment Weekly, Kyle Anderson expressed that the song delivers "a lot of bluster but little heart". HipHopDX's Edwin Ortiz commented that the song is lacking the majority of the album's execution and creativeness as Swizz Beatz's recognizable "sharp, bouncing production fall[s] to the wayside". Beats Per Minute critic Sean Highkins commented that although the song's rapping is among the best on Watch the Throne, it is ruined by Swizz Beatz's "grating production and contractually-insured ad-libbing". He considered these types of ad-libs to be so cancerous to mainstream hip-hop that a law should be passed by the United States Congress prohibiting Swizz Beatz or rapper will.i.am from performing on any artist's tracks they produced. For Tiny Mix Tapes, Ross Green offered that swapping the song and "Lift Off" for the bonus tracks "The Joy" and "Illest Motherfucker Alive" would have improved Watch the Throne, singling out the producer's vocals as annoying. In a similar review, the staff of XXL looked at it as "forced in comparison to the rest of the material".

In the US, the song peaked at number four on the Billboard Bubbling Under R&B/Hip-Hop Singles chart. It lasted for three weeks on the chart.

== Credits and personnel ==
Credits are adapted from the album's liner notes.

Recording

- Recorded at Tribeca Grand Hotel (NYC) and (The Mercer) Hotel (New York)
- Mixed at (The Mercer) Hotel (New York)

Personnel

- Kanye West – songwriter
- Jay-Z – songwriter
- Swizz Beatz – songwriter, production, additional vocals
- Mike Dean – songwriter, keys, mix engineer
- Ken Lewis – recording engineer, instruments
- Noah Goldstein – recording engineer
- Brent Kolato – recording engineer
- Acapella Soul – additional vocals

== Charts ==
Chart performance for "Welcome to the Jungle"
Chart (2011)	Peak position
US Bubbling Under R&B/Hip-Hop Singles (Billboard)	4

== See also ==
- Welcome to the Jungle
