= Watch the Throne =

- Standard digital and jewel case cover.

Studio album by Jay-Z and Kanye West
- Released: August 8, 2011
- Recorded: July 2010 (Note: Though the recording sessions for Watch the Throne formally began in November 2010, the songs "That's My Bitch" and "The Joy" were recorded for West's previous album My Beautiful Dark Twisted Fantasy as early as July 2010.); November 2010 – July 2011
- Studios: Avex (Honolulu); Barford Estate (Sydney); Electric Lady; The Mercer Hotel; MSR; Tribeca Grand Hotel (New York City); Le Meurice (Paris); Real World (Wiltshire); Unknown location (Abu Dhabi)
- Genres: Hip-hop; progressive rap
- Length: 46:12
- Labels: Roc Nation; Roc-A-Fella; Def Jam
- Producers: Kanye West; 88-Keys; Hit-Boy; Pete Rock; Jeff Bhasker; Mike Dean; No I.D.; The Neptunes; Q-Tip; RZA; Sak Pase; Swizz Beatz; Avery Chambliss; S1; Southside; Lex Luger

Alternate cover
- Front cover for vinyl and digipak releases.

Jay-Z chronology
The Hits Collection, Volume One (2010)	Watch the Throne (2011)	Live in Brooklyn (2012)

Kanye West chronology
My Beautiful Dark Twisted Fantasy (2010)	Watch the Throne (2011)	Cruel Summer (2012)

Singles from Watch the Throne
- 1. "H.A.M." Released: January 11, 2011; 2. "Otis" Released: July 20, 2011; 3. "Lift Off" Released: August 23, 2011; 4. "Niggas in Paris" Released: September 13, 2011; 5. "Why I Love You" Released: September 13, 2011; 6. "Gotta Have It" Released: December 6, 2011; 7. "No Church in the Wild" Released: March 20, 2012

Watch the Throne is a collaborative studio album by the American rappers Jay-Z and Kanye West. It was released on August 8, 2011, by Roc-A-Fella Records, Roc Nation, and Def Jam Recordings. Prior to its release, Jay-Z and West had collaborated on various singles, and with the latter as a producer on the former's work. They originally sought to record a five-song collaborative extended play, which evolved into a full-length album. The album features guest appearances from Frank Ocean, The-Dream, Beyoncé and Mr Hudson. It also features vocal contributions from Kid Cudi, Seal, Justin Vernon, Elly Jackson, Connie Mitchell, Charlie Wilson, and Pete Rock, among others. Samples of vocals by soul musicians Otis Redding and Curtis Mayfield are both credited as guest features on the album.

Recording sessions took place at various locations and began in November 2010, with production led by West and a variety of high-profile producers, including Mike Dean, Swizz Beatz, Pete Rock, RZA, Jeff Bhasker, The Neptunes, and Q-Tip. Expanding on the dense production style of West's fifth studio album, My Beautiful Dark Twisted Fantasy (2010), Watch the Throne incorporates orchestral and progressive rock influences, unconventional samples, and dramatic melodies in its sound. The braggadocious lyrics exhibit themes of excellence, opulence, decadence, fame, materialism, power, and the burdens of success, as well as political and socioeconomic critique. The album also expresses other topics, such as Jay-Z's thoughts on fatherhood, West's reflection on being deemed a social villain, and their success as performers. Many writers interpreted the subject matter to concern the plight of African Americans struggling with financial success in America.

Seven singles were released for Watch the Throne, including "H.A.M.", "Otis", "Lift Off", "No Church in the Wild", and the Billboard Hot 100 top five hit "Niggas in Paris", with 3 of the singles receiving music videos. Jay-Z and West embarked on the Watch the Throne Tour for promotion that spanned from October 2011 to June 2012 and became the highest-grossing hip-hop concert tour in history. The album received highly positive reviews from music critics, who mostly praised the rappers' performances and the production. However, some reviewers found the lyrical content uninspiring.

Many critics and publications named Watch the Throne to their year-end best-of lists, including Rolling Stone and The Washington Post. The album debuted at number one on the US Billboard 200, selling 436,000 copies in the first week, and broke the iTunes Store first-week sales record at the time. It reached the top ten in 11 other countries, including Canada and the United Kingdom. It was also certified quintuple platinum in the United States by the Recording Industry Association of America (RIAA) in November 2020.

== Background ==
Jay-Z and Kanye West first worked together on the song "This Can't Be Life", from Jay-Z's 2000 album The Dynasty: Roc La Familia, produced by West, then on Jay-Z's 2001 album The Blueprint, which showcased West's distinctive style of hip-hop production at the time. West's early production work on Jay-Z's music helped raise his profile in the music industry. While originally only viewed as a producer, West eventually was seen as both a viable rapper and producer thanks to the success of his debut album, The College Dropout, and its singles. West continued to be one of Jay-Z's main producers on subsequent albums such as The Black Album and Kingdom Come. Jay-Z also appeared on Kanye's first two albums, and the two frequently collaborated. Further collaborative work by the two included singles such as "Swagga Like Us" from rapper T.I.'s Paper Trail, "Run This Town" from Jay-Z's The Blueprint 3, and both "Monster" and "So Appalled" from West's My Beautiful Dark Twisted Fantasy.

During the promotional stages of West's My Beautiful Dark Twisted Fantasy, a remix of the song "Power" surfaced featuring Jay-Z. Following this, West announced on Twitter his intention to drop a five-track EP with Jay-Z, titled Watch the Throne. Also according to the rapper, the track "Monster" was intended for the EP, though that failed to surface. It was later revealed by West that the project had been expanded into a full-length album in an October 2010 interview for MTV. He said in the interview that they planned to record in the south of France.

In an August 2011 radio interview with WEDR, Jay-Z shared the meaning behind the album's title;

"It's just protecting the music and the culture. It's people that's in the forefront of the music. Watch the Throne, like protect it. You just watch how popular music shift, and how hip-hop basically replaced rock & roll as the youth music. The same thing can happen to hip-hop. It can be replaced by other forms of music. So it's making sure that we put the effort into making the best product so we can contend with all this other music, with dance music that's dominating the charts right now and indie music that's dominating the festivals."

== Recording ==
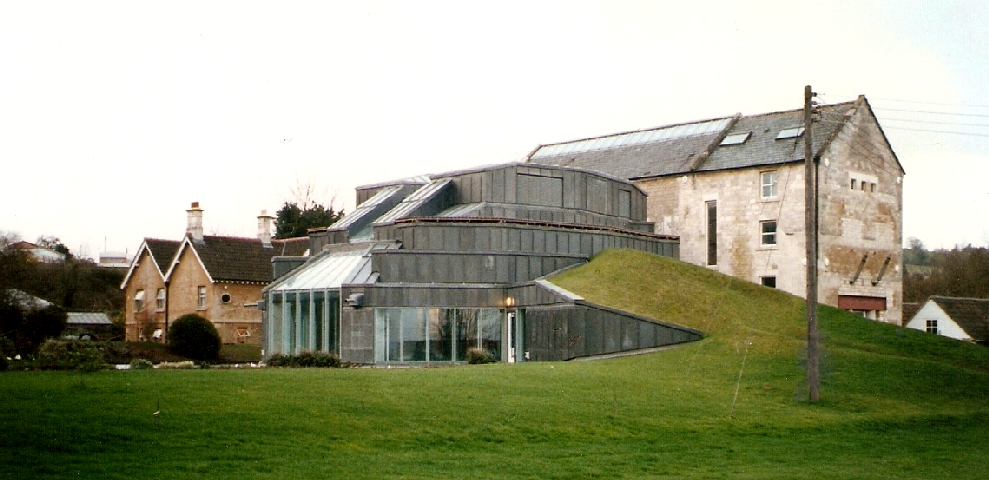
Jay-Z and West recorded at various locations, including Real World Studios in Wiltshire, England.

Recording sessions for the album took place at Avex Recording Studio in Honolulu, Hawaii; Barford Estate in Sydney, Australia; Electric Lady Studios; The Mercer Hotel; MSR Studios; and Tribeca Grand Hotel in New York City; Le Meurice in Paris, France; and Real World Studios in Wiltshire, England. The songs "That's My Bitch" and "The Joy" were previously recorded for My Beautiful Dark Twisted Fantasy as early as July 2010. Production began in November 2010 in England and continued during available times in Jay-Z's and West's schedules at locations in Australia, Paris, Abu Dhabi, New York City, and Los Angeles. In an interview for Billboard, Jay-Z said that they often recorded in hotel rooms and that the album went through three iterations, as he and West had scaled back from their original musical direction. He noted difficulties in the recording process, including arguments with West regarding their direction. Following the release of lead single, "H.A.M." in January 2011, Jay-Z stated that the less-than-stellar reception caused a change in the production of the album. Jay-Z announced that it was unlikely that the track would ultimately make the album. The issues at the beginning of production had caused a delay in the release. In an interview for Rolling Stone, Jay-Z discussed their insistence on recording in person and attributed it to the delay in releasing the album, stating, "If we were gonna do it, we were gonna do it together. No mailing it in".

The album's earlier sessions produced a little material that has made the final cut. West had brought a majority of his usual production crew onto the project, the same crew that had assisted in the creation of My Beautiful Dark Twisted Fantasy. One of the main exceptions was producer No I.D., who felt that the two artists weren't pushing forward enough with the music. In an interview with Complex, No I.D. commented about the project that "you're going to sell, because you're already big. But you guys are important to push this forward. Push intelligence and decadence and all of the above forward in a creative manner." While his advice was acknowledged to a degree, he ultimately had very little part in the finished project. In January 2011, they regrouped and rented a block of rooms at the Mercer Hotel in New York City and invited a select group of producers and recording artists. Chauncey "Hit-Boy" Hollis, who produced the track "Niggas in Paris", said of recording at the hotel, "There was music going on in every room. I had a room where I was cranking out beats, and then I'd go into the main room with Jay and [Kanye] and play beats for them. Kanye is really hands-on. I would come in with a beat and he'd be like, 'Take this out, slow it down.' It would make it sound 100 times better. Jay would then mumble different flows to the beat".

Parts of the album were recorded in New York City's Tribeca Grand Hotel. Recording artist and producer Ryan Leslie also confirmed his involvement in the recording of Watch the Throne. Producer 88-Keys reportedly played 20 of his beats to West and Jay, who only eventually used one on the finished album. The Wu-Tang Clan's RZA, who had worked on West's previous album, is credited as a producer on the track "New Day". Watch the Throne was mastered by producer and engineer Mike Dean at the Mercer Hotel.

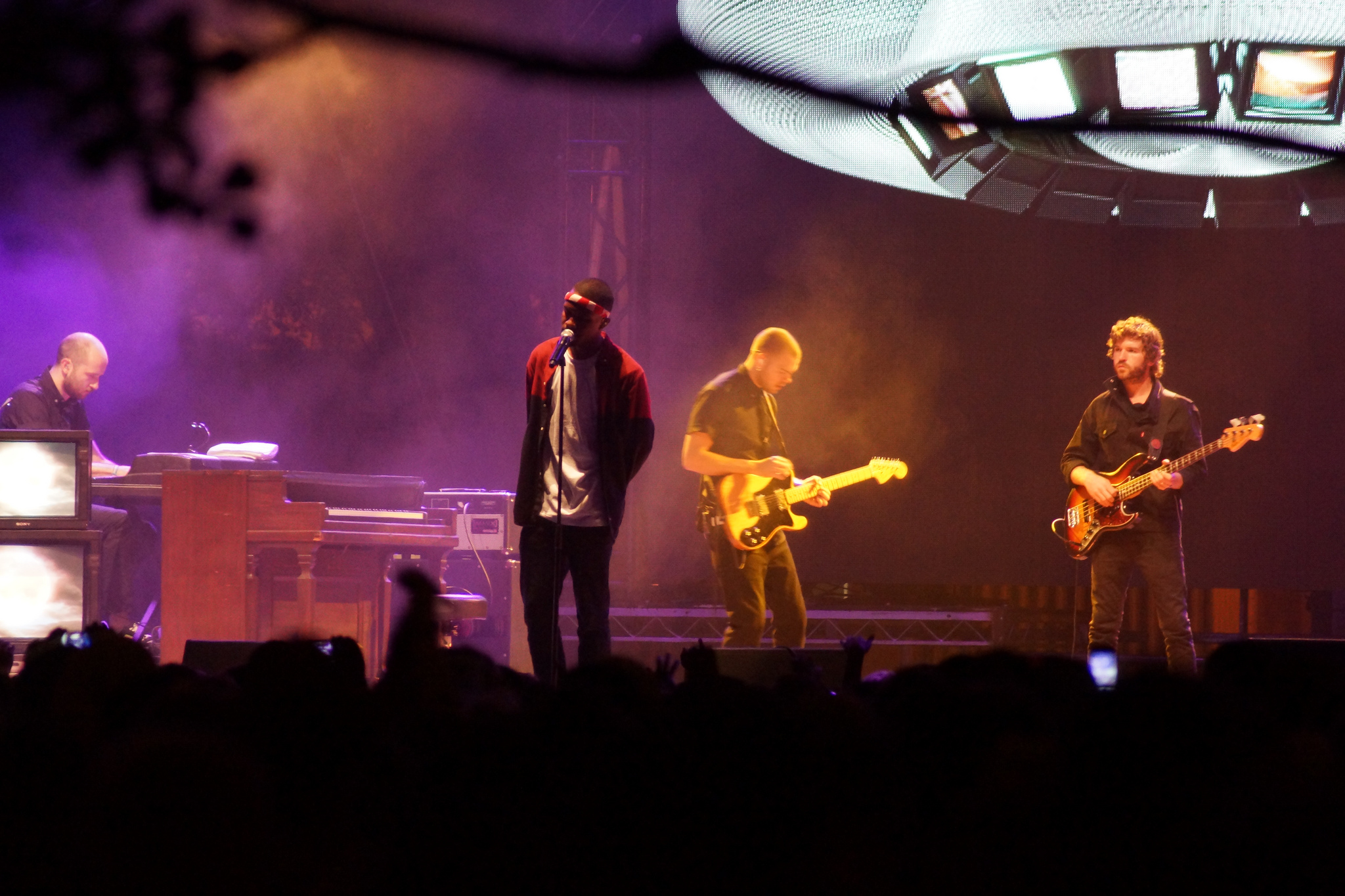
Singer Frank Ocean appears on "No Church in the Wild" and "Made in America". Ocean was brought onto the project per the reception of his prior musical ventures.

Jay-Z and West worked with several guest recording artists, including Beyoncé, Frank Ocean, and Mr Hudson. "No Church in the Wild", the last song recorded for the album, was conceived by Jay-Z, West, and the song's producer 88-Keys throughout most of June. Producer and recording artist The-Dream sings a verse on the track using AutoTune. The song features R&B singer Frank Ocean, who released his debut mixtape, nostalgia,ULTRA, in early 2011 to critical acclaim. The release of the mixtape interested Jay-Z and West. Jay-Z's wife Beyoncé recommended the involvement of the singer in particular, who appears on both "No Church in the Wild" and "Made in America". Ocean admitted that Jay-Z has intentionally intimidated him during recording sessions but declared his enjoyment of working with the two. Ocean mused about the project:

"I rarely do collabs, so that's just one of the ones you absolutely do. It's like a no-brainer. I didn't really think about any of it. The last thing on my mind was working with artists who I've held in high esteem for years. [...] I worked with Jay on his solo album before I did the Watch the Throne sessions. The second time I went it was Barry Weiss, Jay, Beyoncé, Kanye, couple other people, it was a pretty heavy room."

"Lift Off" was recorded in Sydney, Australia. In early May 2011, rumors arose that "Lift Off" was to feature Bruno Mars who had recorded vocals. It was reported that the song would be released as the lead single from the album. However, Mars never appeared on the song and Beyoncé sang several lines during the chorus instead. Additional vocalists Elly Jackson, Connie Mitchell, and Justin Vernon provide the hook on "That's My Bitch". Vernon had previously appeared on West's album My Beautiful Dark Twisted Fantasy, when West sampled Vernon's band Bon Iver's song "Woods". Vernon also provided additional vocals on songs such as "Dark Fantasy" and "Monster". Swizz Beatz, who produced "Welcome to the Jungle", also provided background vocals to the track, and Kid Cudi contributed additional vocals to "The Joy" and "Illest Motherfucker Alive", bonus tracks on the album's deluxe edition. One of the tracks recorded during the album sessions but ultimately excluded from the final track list was "Living So Italian". The song sampled Andrea Bocelli's "Con te partirò" and, despite being described as catchy, was reportedly not released due to issues clearing the sample.

In 2013, Jay-Z released his twelfth studio album, Magna Carta... Holy Grail. In an interview, he revealed that two songs on the album were initially recorded for Watch the Throne - the song "Oceans", which features Frank Ocean, and the song "Holy Grail", which went on to feature Justin Timberlake. (Timberlake's contribution to the track was not anticipated at the time, until the duo collaborated on Timberlake's 2013 comeback single "Suit & Tie" and "Murder" from The 20/20 Experience and The 20/20 Experience – 2 of 2 respectively.) West and Jay-Z argued for four days about including them on Watch the Throne, but West eventually relented and the duo recorded "No Church in the Wild" and "Made in America". In an interview with Zane Lowe, Jay-Z said: "[There were] no lyrics on 'Holy Grail' and I recorded 'Oceans' and I played those records for Kanye," Jay explained. "And he was like, 'No those have to go on Watch the Throne,' so we spent four days arguing about those records and I was explaining to him why it wasn't right for this project and I had a whole idea for making this album called Magna Carta... Holy Grail, the "Holy Grail" part of the name came after."

== Music and lyrics ==
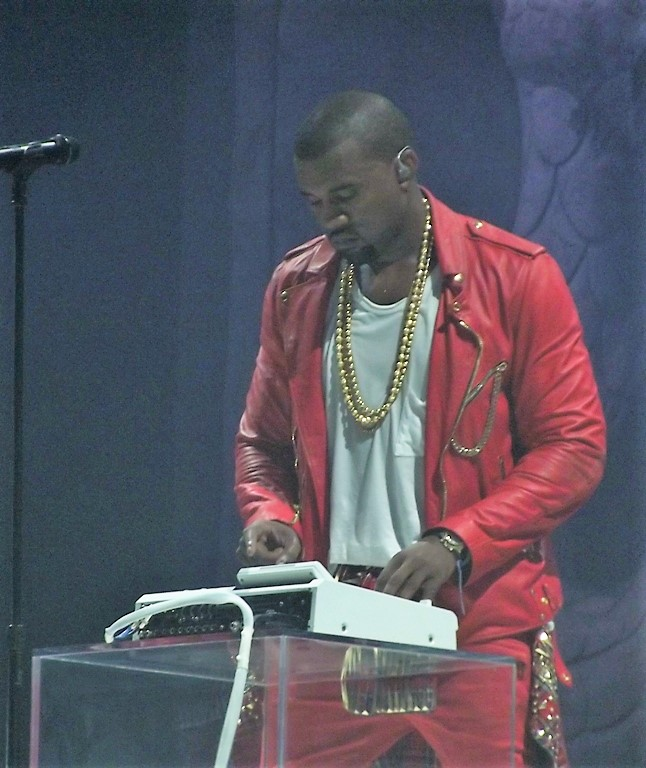
Stylistically the record features production handled by West largely considered unconventional. It is an aesthetic quality shared with his previous solo album.

Julian Benbow of The Boston Globe writes that the album's music is as "massive, dour, and relentlessly unconventional" as that of West's previous 2010 album My Beautiful Dark Twisted Fantasy. Music writer Robert Christgau describes West's production as "a funkier and less ornate variant of the prog-rap of 2010's acclaimed My Beautiful Dark Twisted Fantasy". Music journalist Jody Rosen characterizes the music as "vast, dark and booming," commenting that West "continues in the sonic vein he introduced in My Beautiful Dark Twisted Fantasy, lacing the songs with rock dynamics, layering his beats with eerie vocal chorales, piling on proggy flourishes." Conversely, Matthew Cole of Slant Magazine finds West's "knack for dramatic, melodically sophisticated tracks [...] channeled away from the Olympian scale" of his previous album "and toward the more commercial vein of Jay-Z's recent work," which he attributes to West splitting production work with several other producers. On the songs' structure, Cole states, "every track eschews the standard verse-hook-repeat format in favor of more dynamic material."

Music journalist Alexis Petridis comments that the album incorporates "unlikely samples." Jon Caramanica of The New York Times writes that its production "can be roughly segmented into three categories," noting "Southern-inflected tracks" such as "Niggas in Paris" and "H.A.M.", "moody and harsh numbers" like "Who Gon Stop Me" and "Why I Love You", and "the nostalgia that creeps over much of this album, giving it a sonic through-line and mission statement." Pitchfork's Tom Breihan perceives "pure orchestral excess" on some of its songs and describes the album's musical scope as "a tribute to [West's] distinctive taste and sense of style."

The album features themes of opulence, fame, materialism, power, and the burdens of success. Jay-Z's and West's lyrics include boasts of obscene wealth, grandiosity, and social commentary. Sputnikmusic's Tyler Fisher describes Watch the Throne as "an album centered around larger-than-life egos." Robert Christgau notes "regal grandiosity" and "glory" as primary themes on the album. Andy Kellman of AllMusic characterizes much of the album's lyrical content as "ruthless flaunting of material wealth and carte blanche industry resources." Rob Harvilla of Spin views that their lyrics express elitism, narcissism, "relentless capitalism," and "smug yet undeniable greatness."

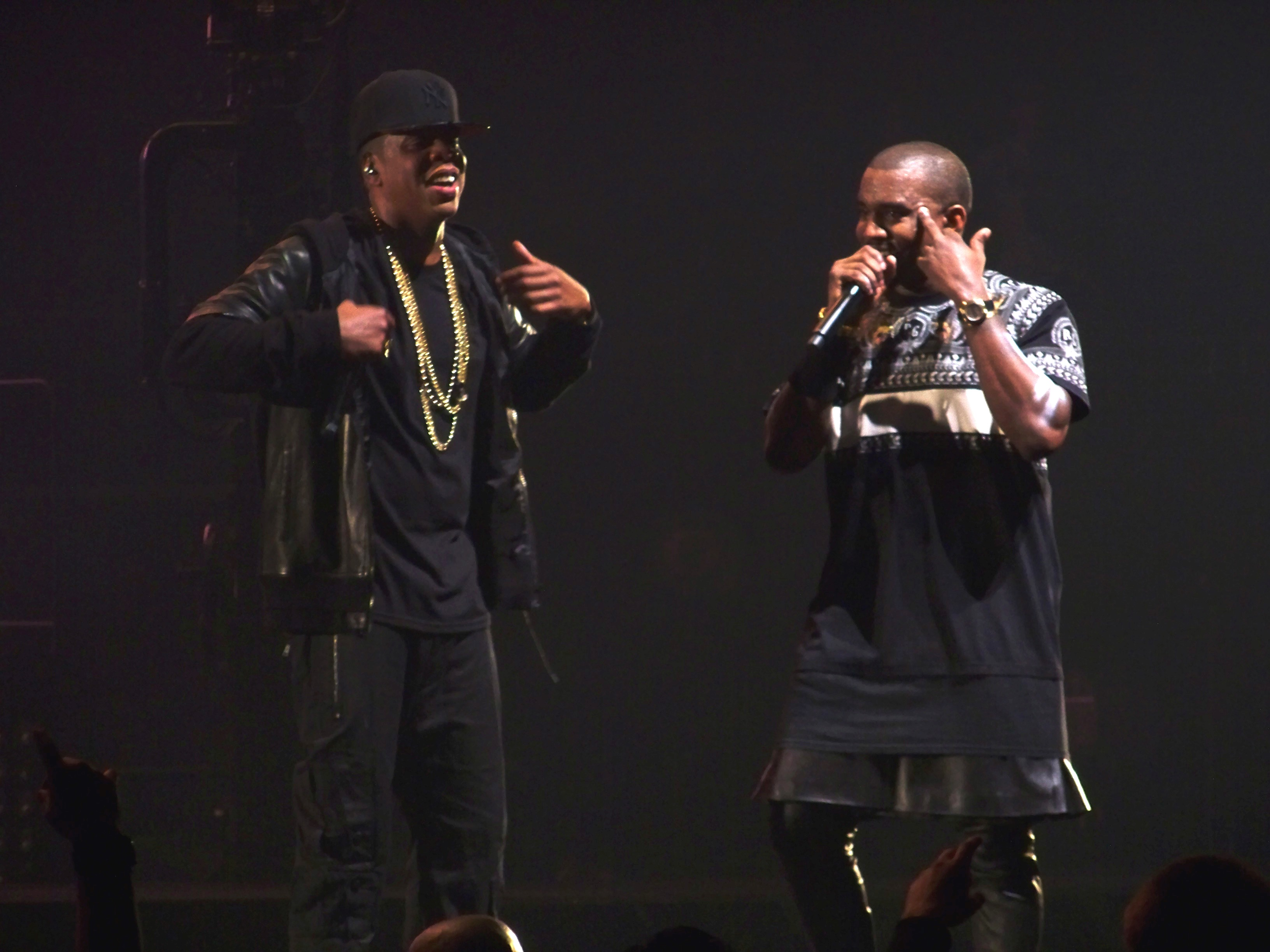
The album's lyrics contain braggadocious themes pertaining to opulence, fame, power and the burdens of success in addition to socio-political commentary on the financial struggles of African-Americans in America.

Music critic Greg Kot views that the album is about "mutual admiration" and writes of the rappers' respective personas, "Jay-Z is about imperious flow, bridging his gritty past life on the streets with his current status as a cultural tastemaker and business mogul. [...] West is more desperate, transparent, awkward, vulnerable." Music critic Nathan Rabin states that Jay-Z and West "are a study in contrasts: the businessman and the bohemian, the faithful husband and the drugged-up playboy, the walking press release and the loose cannon. Jay-Z is tidy. Kanye is nothing but rough edges." Jon Caramanica writes similarly, "breaking [...] old barriers is a means to acceptance and stability" for Jay-Z, while "West sounds lonely" with his fame, adding that "For Mr. West every flash of Dionysian extreme is tempered by the realization of its hollowness." In his article "Brag Like That" for Barnes & Noble, Robert Christgau comments that "Jay-Z is a grown man and Kanye is not" on the album and elaborates on their lyrics, stating:

Both co-kings flaunt their arrogance even by the standards of a genre where braggadocio is the main event, and neither is shy about pretending that the line of succession from Otis Redding and Martin Luther King is paved with their gold. [...] One could venture that maybe Watch the Throne divvies up the way it does for rhetorical purposes—that one king plays the hero and the other the hedonist, two equally royal hip-hop archetypes.

Their lyrics also exhibit political and socioeconomic context, which Jody Rosen denotes as "serious, sober, weighty." Nitsuh Abebe of New York views that the album is "about the relationship of black American men to wealth, power, and success. [...] a portrait of two black men thinking through the idea of success in America." He compares it to Yinka Shonibare's 1998 piece Diary of a Victorian Dandy, "in which the artist luxuriates in all the genteel pleasures of the time." Randall Roberts of the Los Angeles Times notes "musings on the spoils of riches and the chaos that accompanies it," adding that "[the] tension between worshiping the spirit and celebrating the bounty drives Watch the Throne [...] The record questions faith while clinging to heritage and family, places this moment in an historical context, wonders on the mystery, power and confusion of the gilded life — while rolling around in amulets." Writer Kitty Empire interprets it to be about "black power [...] conceived as a swaggering taunt of achievement, in line with both men's previous works, which routinely double as shopping guides. [...] [T]hey need to humanise all the conspicuous consumption." Claire Suddath of Time views the rappers' "bacchanal celebration of the finer things in life" as secondary to the theme of "two men grappling with what it means to be successful and black in a nation that still thinks of them as second class."

== Songs ==
"No Church in the Wild"
Opener "No Church in the Wild" features a forceful, cinematic and bass-heavy beat. Ocean provides one of the song's hooks.

"Otis"
Sample of "Otis" which features Jay-Z and West trading verses over the riff of the sample. The track is similar to the style of early West productions.

The opening track "No Church in the Wild" features a cinematic production style. Singers Frank Ocean and The-Dream lend their voices to the album's grim opener, which sets the mood with a gnarled guitar sample. Over the rock-centric, rolling production, both rappers muse over familiar themes of loyalty, sexuality and maternal solidarity. On the album, the song closes with a segment of Italian avant-prog band Orchestra Njervudarov's 1979 piece "Tristessa", which reappears at the end of several other songs. The pop-oriented "Lift Off" features baroque strings and a chorus sung by Beyoncé Knowles, accompanied with synthesizers. The song contains horns and martial drums as Knowles sings, "We gon' take it to the moon/ Take it to the stars." "Niggas in Paris" incorporates staccato orchestration and fizzing industrial noise, topping it all off with a menacing beat and icy synthesizer notes. The track features an unusual sampling of dialogue from the 2007 film Blades of Glory, notably the "we're gonna skate to one song and one song only" line. West and Jay-Z's lyrics frame their rags to riches story on the song.

"Otis" samples Otis Redding's 1966 song "Try a Little Tenderness", manipulating it into a rhythm track with Otis Redding's vocals and grunts. The sample is used in a way that is reminiscent of past Kanye productions, like the tracks found on his album The College Dropout. Redding's vocals are chopped up so thoroughly that his voice serves as a mere melodic riff on the track, with both rappers promptly rapping over it in a braggadocious fashion. "Gotta Have It", produced by The Neptunes, incorporates chopped-up James Brown vocal samples and Eastern flute melodies. The song contains haunting backing vocals and an accompanying tambourine with the two rappers trading verses with the vocal riff playing over them. Much like "Otis", the track features sliced-up vocal snippets and an aggressive bass backing, with the two rappers trading lines and making references to the Yung Chris song "Racks" and other contemporary rap trends.

On "New Day", they address future sons about fame. It references the line "me and the RZA connect" from Raekwon's 1995 song "Incarcerated Scarfaces", which was also produced by RZA. The track incorporates a sample of Nina Simone's 1965 song "Feeling Good" through an Auto-Tune voice processor. Both rappers discuss their futures as fathers on the track, flowing smoothly over mellow, lightly psychedelic synthesizer tones. Both Justin Vernon and La Roux appear on "That's My Bitch", spitting off hooks over a quick, melodic beat, with West at his most abrasive lyrically. On "Welcome to the Jungle", Jay-Z laments personal losses and overcoming struggles. Sharing the name with a Guns N' Roses track, Jay describes himself as the "black Axl Rose" over a jittery, treble-heavy Swizz Beatz production.

"Who Gon Stop Me" features bombastic production and samples Flux Pavilion's 2011 song "I Can't Stop", reinforced with heavy synthesizer and tone shifts. The song utilizes an often experimental, bass-driven and dubstep-influenced style of composition, with West forcefully rapping lines like "this is something like the Holocaust". "Murder to Excellence" addresses black-on-black crime and limited social mobility for African Americans. Midway through the song the beat switches up, with Kanye musing over the horrors of black-on-black violence in the first half, and Jay-Z delivering equally meditated comments on black excellence on the more choir-heavy second half. A sample from Indiggo's "LA LA LA" can be heard on the song. At 5 minutes in length, "Murder to Excellence" is the longest track on the album.

"Made in America" has themes of family life and the American Dream, with Jay-Z and West discussing their respective rises to fame, while acknowledging those who helped and inspired them. The song has been described as an understated soft-pop track with influence from Michael Jackson and his 1985 charity single "We Are the World". Ocean's hook pays tribute to Martin Luther King Jr., Coretta Scott King, Malcolm X, Betty Shabazz and Jesus on one of the album's more serene tracks. Jay-Z muses on his drug-dealing past with lines like "our apple pie was supplied by Arm & Hammer", with West's verse describing his conflict with fame. "Why I Love You" has Jay-Z lamenting betrayal and how his past protégés failed to maintain without him. The track contains a "sledgehammer beat" which is built around French house duo Cassius' 2010 single "I <3 U So". West's production continues in the sonic vein he introduced in My Beautiful Dark Twisted Fantasy, lacing the song with rock dynamics, layering the beat with eerie vocal chorales in the style of progressive rock songs.

== Release and promotion ==
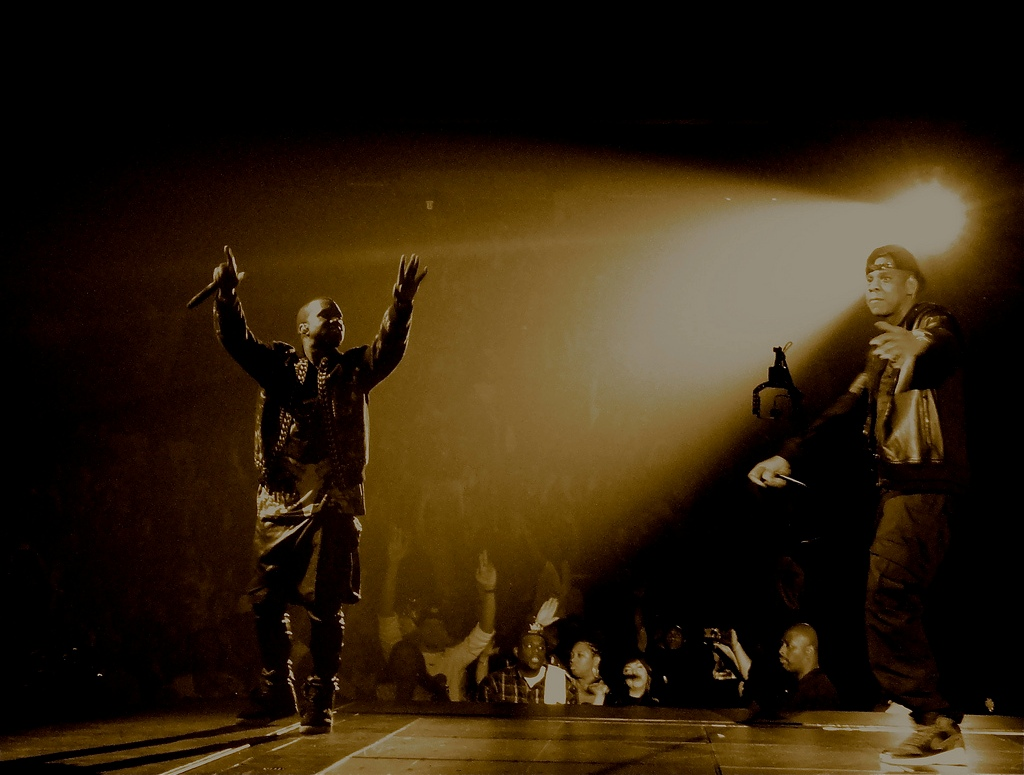
West (left) and Jay-Z (right) on the Watch the Throne Tour, 2011.

Watch the Throne was released by Roc-A-Fella Records, Roc Nation, and Def Jam Recordings, Jay-Z's and West's respective record labels. On July 4, 2011, it was made available to pre-order on Life + Times, Jay-Z's lifestyle webzine, which redirected to Island Def Jam's website that featured the deluxe version available for $16.99, standard CD for $13.99, a deluxe digital version for $14.99, and standard digital album for $11.99. On July 22, its pre-order was made available on the iTunes Store. Internationally the album was released digitally on August 8 exclusively through iTunes, while its physical release was made available on August 12. Its deluxe CD edition was sold exclusively by Best Buy through August 23, when it became available at other retailers. The sales strategy received criticism from other retailers, who accused the labels of giving preferential treatment to iTunes and Best Buy. One of the most anticipated releases in 2011, Watch the Throne became one of the few major-label albums in the Internet age to avoid a leak.

On July 7, 2011, Jay-Z hosted a private listening session at the Mercer Hotel in New York City, previewing the album's songs from his MacBook Pro for a select group of reporters and music journalists. It was also exclusive to two teenage fans who had won access to the session for being the first people to pre-order the album through Jay-Z's Life + Times website. The album's cover and artwork, both designed by Italian designer Riccardo Tisci, were also premiered at the session. Benjamin Meadows-Ingrim of Billboard, who attended the session, said of the previewed material, "The songs were dramatic and boastful, with Jay-Z often taking the lead lyrically, and the collection showcased the differences between the two artists – Jay-Z, the technical marksman, and Kanye, the emotive chest beater." One of the previewed songs, "Living So Italian", was excluded from the final album following sample clearance problems.

On August 1, Jay-Z and West held a listening session for the album at the Rose Center for Earth and Space in New York City's American Museum of Natural History. The session premiered the album in its entirety and featured attendance from journalists, models, industry types, and recording artists such as Busta Rhymes, 88-Keys, and Beyoncé Knowles. On August 28, Jay-Z and West performed "Otis" at the 2011 MTV Video Music Awards.

Jay-Z and West promoted Watch the Throne with a 34-date, North American concert tour produced by Live Nation, which began on October 28 and concluded on June 22, 2012. By the end of 2011 the tour had grossed $48.3 million making it the then highest-grossing hip-hop tour (until being surpassed by Summer Sixteen Tour) and the eighth-highest-grossing tour of 2011.

== Singles ==
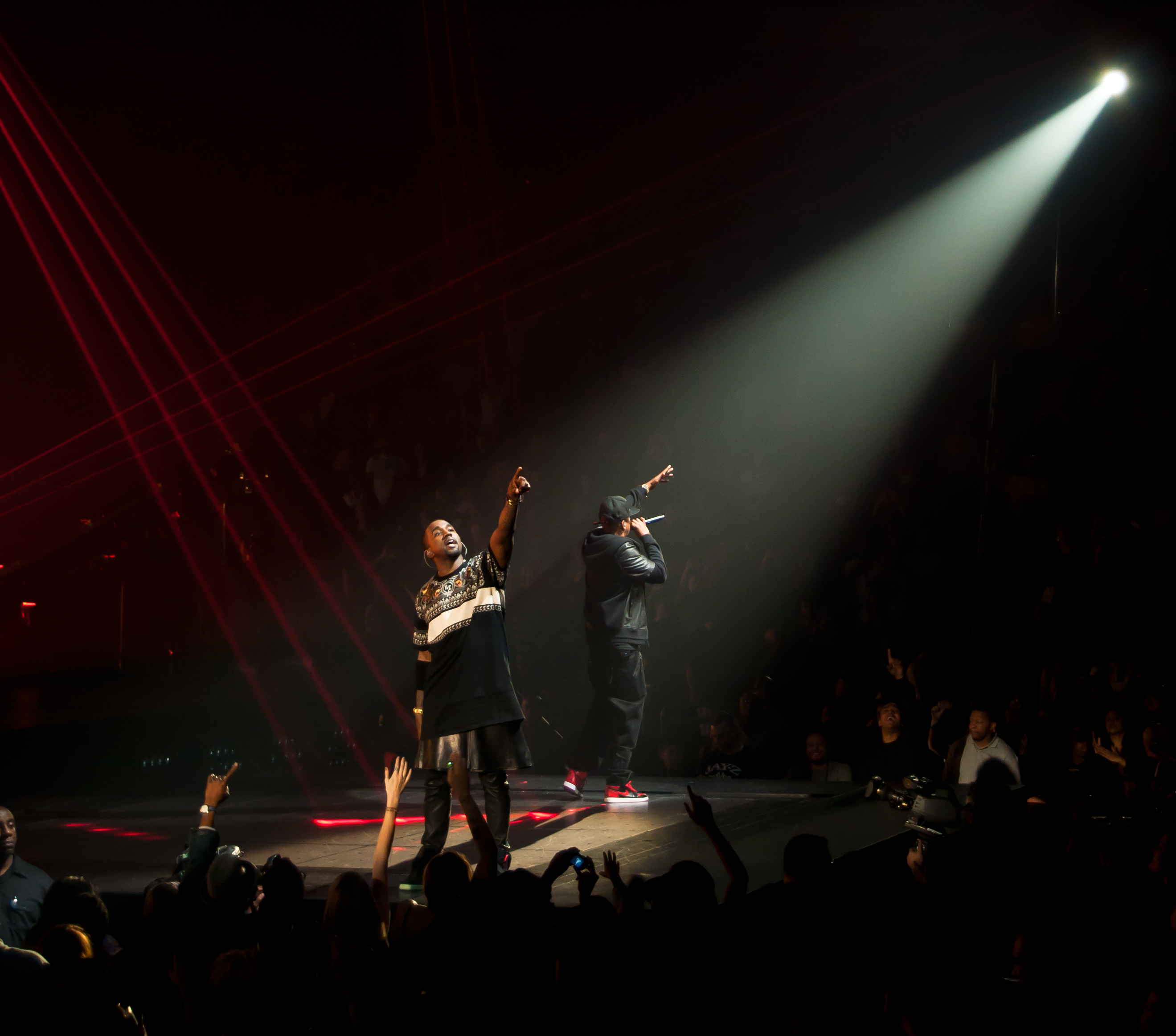
Singles from Watch the Throne were performed on the album's corresponding promotional tour.

Watch the Throne spawned seven official singles, with varying degrees of success. Following West's announcement via his Twitter account, "H.A.M." was officially released as a digital download in January 2011 as the lead single. It charted at number 23 on the US Billboard Hot 100. In July 2011, "Otis" became the second single when it was premiered on Funkmaster Flex's Hot 97 radio show and subsequently leaked to the Internet. It was sent to rhythmic contemporary and urban contemporary radio on August 9. "Otis" reached number 12 on the Hot 100. A music video for the song was filmed by director Spike Jonze in Los Angeles. Third single "Lift Off" was sent to US urban radio on August 23 of the same year. The track peaked on the US Bubbling Under Hot 100 Singles at position 6.

The album's fourth and fifth singles were released simultaneously; in September 2011, "Why I Love You" was sent to US rhythmic radio, and "Niggas in Paris" was sent to both rhythmic and urban radio. "Why I Love You" served as a European-centric single while "Niggas in Paris" was promoted as a domestic single. "Niggas in Paris" peaked at number five on the Hot 100. "Niggas in Paris" was sent to Top 40/Mainstream radio on November 8. By February 2012, it had reached digital sales of ten million in the United States. The song was promoted with a music video directed by West himself, featuring concert footage.

The sixth single was "Gotta Have It", which impacted Urban radio on December 6, 2011, and Rhythmic radio on January 31, 2012. Seventh and final single "No Church in the Wild" impacted Urban radio on March 20, 2012. Romain Gavras directed a music video for "No Church" though it featured none of the featured performers. "Gotta Have It" peaked at position 69 on the Hot 100, with "No Church in the Wild" peaking at 72. Though not released as a single, "Who Gon Stop Me" peaked at 44 on the chart.

== Critical reception ==
Professional ratings
Aggregate scores
Source	Rating
AnyDecentMusic?	7.4/10
Metacritic	76/100
Review scores
Source	Rating
AllMusic	3.5/5 stars
The Daily Telegraph	5/5 stars
Entertainment Weekly	B−
The Guardian	4/5 stars
The Independent	2/5 stars
MSN Music (Expert Witness)	A−
Pitchfork	8.5/10
Rolling Stone	3.5/5 stars
Spin	6/10
USA Today	4/4 stars

According to the review aggregator Metacritic, Watch the Throne received "generally favorable reviews" based on a weighted average score of 76 out of 100 from 42 critic scores. Nathan Rabin of The A.V. Club wrote that "exhilarating messiness and go-for-broke spontaneity infect Jay-Z and push him outside his comfort zone and into a realm of intense emotional reflection." Pitchfork's Tom Breihan felt that it "works best when Jay and Kanye are just talking about how great they are," adding that "Kanye is this album's obvious guiding force ... He displays levels of unequaled audacity." Claire Suddath of Time called it "a beautifully decadent album by two of hip-hop's finest artists—men with a lot of things to say and a lot of money to spend." Neil McCormick of The Daily Telegraph praised West's "attention to detail" and found their "wit and absurdity [...] entirely suited to the epic scale of productions." Kitty Empire of The Observer stated, "Some find this sort of branded gloating distasteful, but at their best both rappers can still make you laugh." Randall Roberts of the Los Angeles Times deemed it "a cocksure, fiery, smart, if problematic, collaboration that showcases the pair's distinct lyrical skills." Julian Benbow of The Boston Globe observed "an undeniable synergy that they embraced for this project." AllMusic editor Andy Kellman called it "an audacious spectacle of vacuous pomposity as well as one of tremendous lyrical depth."

Slant Magazine's Matthew Cole was less impressed, believing West had contributed a "powerhouse production" but that the album "requires you to tolerate the artists' self-mythologizing and put up with their sometimes awkward attempts at experimentation." Andy Gill of The Independent was more critical and found their rapping "pretty mediocre", partly because "too often here their complacent, back-slapping laxity leaves tracks floundering." In the Chicago Tribune, Greg Kot found the record plagued by Jay-Z and West's "self-regard", writing that "they urge listeners to 'watch the throne,' and gaze in awe on their good fortune." Jody Rosen of Rolling Stone felt that "on a record this ambitious, this sonically bold, it's a shame two of music's greatest storytellers don't extend their gaze beyond their own luxe lives." Sasha Frere-Jones of The New Yorker stated, "Weed the album down to a healthy ten, and [it] doesn't become either classic or coherent, but it does work as an entertaining document of two wildly creative, not particularly wound-up friends."

== Accolades ==
=== Critics' rankings ===
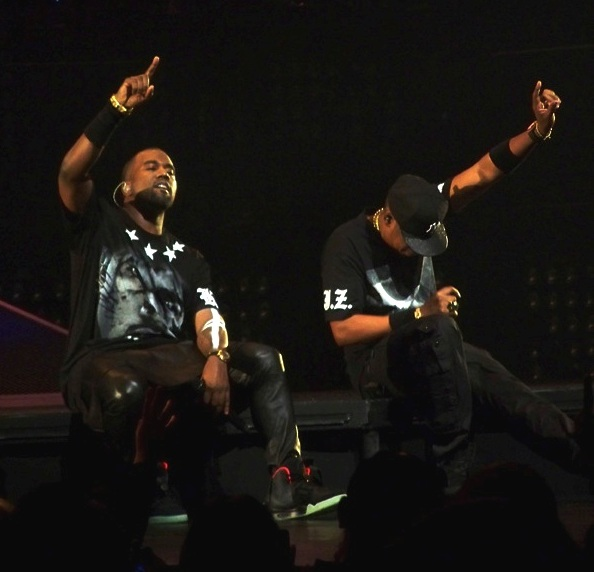
In 2012, Kanye West and Jay-Z won Grammys for the single "Otis"; West became the rapper with the most Grammys in history following the win.

Watch the Throne was one of the top-ranked albums in year-end lists by music critics and publications. Q ranked the album number six in its list of the Top 50 Albums of 2011. Rolling Stone named it the second-best album in its year-end list, commenting that "What could have been a crash-and-burn anticlimax turned out to be as fun as any record in a dog's age. From the cinematic 'No Church in the Wild' to the Stax-soul update 'Otis,' Throne testifies to Kanye West's talent for beats both iconoclastic and pop-savvy." Claire Suddath of Time ranked it number three on her top-10 albums list and called it "a beautifully decadent album". Chris Richards of The Washington Post ranked it number two on his list and stated, "Instead of blushing over their embarrassment of riches, pop's most intriguing partnership delivered a self-congratulatory opus that was adventurous enough to remind us that they're rap visionaries first, 1 percent bazillionaires second. The A.V. Club ranked it number nine on its year-end list, commenting that "Watch The Throne thrives on the bristling tension between Kanye's live-wire energy and rule-breaking abandon, and Jay-Z's innate cautiousness. It's an album of the moment—a point underlined by the presence of Frank Ocean on two tracks—yet it has the substance to endure." Stereogum placed Watch the Throne at number 10 on its list of the "Top 50 albums of 2011" while Pitchfork placed the album at number 21 on its list.

In 2012, Complex named the album one of the classic albums of the last decade. In January 2015, the album was placed at number 8 on Billboard's list of "The 20 Best Albums of the 2010s (So Far)". In 2018, Revolt listed the album at number one on their list of the 10 rap collaboration albums. In 2019, Billboard named Watch the Throne the biggest collaborative album of all time, asserting, "From the iconic album artwork to the brash, decadent lyrical themes, esteemed guest list, and recording around the globe, the Throne would set the standard for what a pristine rap album should embody at the highest of levels."

=== Industry awards ===
Watch the Throne received nominations for Best Rap Album and Best Recording Package at the 54th Annual Grammy Awards in 2012. It lost the former to West's My Beautiful Dark Twisted Fantasy. "Otis" was nominated for Best Rap Performance and Best Rap Song, winning the former. At the 55th Annual Grammy Awards in 2013, "Niggas in Paris" won Best Rap Performance and Best Rap Song, and "No Church in the Wild" won Best Rap/Sung Collaboration.

Year	Organization	Award	Result
2011	American Music Awards	Favorite Rap/Hip-Hop Album	Nominated
2011	Best Art Vinyl Awards	Best Vinyl Art	Nominated
2011	Soul Train Music Awards	Album of the Year	Nominated
2011	Sucker Free Awards	Best Album of the Year	Won
2012	Billboard Music Awards	Top Rap Album	Nominated
2012	BET Hip Hop Awards	CD of the Year	Won
2012	Danish Music Awards	International Album of the Year	Nominated
2012	Dieline Awards	Dieline Package Design Award	Won
2012	Grammy Awards	Best Recording Package	Nominated
2012	Grammy Awards	Best Rap Album	Nominated
2012	NME Awards	Best Album Artwork	Nominated
2012	Swiss Music Awards	Best Album Urban International	Nominated

== Commercial performance ==
Watch the Throne debuted at No. 1 on the US Billboard 200 chart, selling 436,000 copies in its first week. This became Jay-Z's 12th number-one album and West's fifth number-one album in the US. This also became the second-highest debut week of 2011, while its first-week digital sales of 321,000 downloads served as the second-highest one-week sales tally at the time. Watch the Throne broke the US iTunes Store's one-week sales record at the time when it sold nearly 290,000 downloads. The album also reached No. 1 on the US Top R&B/Hip-Hop Albums and the US Top Rap Albums charts. In its second week, the album remained at No. 1 on the chart, selling an additional 177,000 copies. In its third week, the album dropped to No. 2 on the chart, selling 94,000 more copies. In its fourth week, the album dropped to No. 4 on the chart, selling 80,000 copies. In 2011, Watch the Throne ranked as the ninth best-selling album in the US and became the first collaborative album in Nielsen SoundScan history to secure a top ten position on the Billboard 200 year-end chart. It was also the fourth-highest-selling album on iTunes in 2011. As of July 2013, Watch the Throne has sold 1,573,000 copies in the US, according to Nielsen SoundScan. On November 23, 2020, the Recording Industry Association of America (RIAA) certified the album five-times platinum, denoting over five million combined sales and album-equivalent units in the US.

Watch the Throne was also a success outside the US. In Canada, the album debuted at No. 1 on the Billboard Canadian Albums chart, selling 25,000 copies in its first week. In its second week, the album remained at No. 1 on the chart, selling 15,900 more copies. In Australia, the album peaked at No. 2 on the ARIA Albums chart and No. 1 on the Australian Urban Albums Chart. In the United Kingdom, the album debuted at No. 3 on the UK Albums Chart and No. 1 on the UK R&B Albums Chart. The album topped the UK R&B Albums Chart for six non-consecutive weeks between 2011 and 2012. In addition, Watch the Throne peaked at No. 1 on the Norwegian Albums Chart and the Swiss Albums Chart. The album peaked at No. 2 on the German Albums Chart and the Danish Albums Chart, and at No. 3 on the Scottish Albums Chart. It also debuted within the top ten on the Belgian Albums Chart, the Dutch Albums Chart, the French Albums Chart, the Irish Albums Chart, the Russian Albums Chart, and the New Zealand Albums Chart.

== Track listing ==
No.	Title	Writer(s)	Producer(s)	Length
1.	"No Church in the Wild" (featuring Frank Ocean and The-Dream)	Kanye West; Shawn Carter; Christopher Ocean; Charles Njapa; Mike Dean; Terius; Gary Wright; Phil Manzanera; James Brown; Joseph Roach	88-Keys; Kanye West; Dean; Om'Mas Keith^{[c]}	4:32
2.	"Lift Off" (featuring Beyoncé)	West; Carter; Jeff Bhasker; Dean; Pharrell Williams; Bruno Mars; Seal Samuel	West; Bhasker; Dean; Q-Tip^{[a]}; Pharrell Williams^{[a]}; Don Jazzy^{[b]}	4:26
3.	"Niggas in Paris"	West; Carter; Chauncey Hollis; Dean; W.A. Donaldson	Hit-Boy; West; Dean^{[a]}; Anthony Kilhoffer^{[b]}	3:39
4.	"Otis" (featuring Otis Redding)	West; Carter; Harry Woods; Jimmy Campbell; Reg Connelly; Kirk Robinson; Roy Hammond; Brown; Roach	West	2:58
5.	"Gotta Have It"	West; Carter; Williams; Brown; Roach; Fred Wesley; Tony Pinckney	The Neptunes; West^{[a]}	2:20
6.	"New Day"	West; Carter; Robert Diggs; Dean; Leslie Bricusse; Anthony Newley	West; RZA; Dean; Ken Lewis^{[b]}	4:32
7.	"That's My Bitch"	West; Carter; Kamaal Fareed; Bhasker; Justin Vernon; Brown; Bobby Byrd; Ronald Lenhoff; Jeremiah Lordan	West; Q-Tip; Bhasker^{[b]}	3:22
8.	"Welcome to the Jungle"	West; Carter; Kassem Dean; M. Dean	Swizz Beatz	2:54
9.	"Who Gon Stop Me"	West; Carter; Shama Joseph; M. Dean; Maurice Simmonds; Joshua Kierkegaard	Sak Pase; West; M. Dean^{[b]}	4:16
10.	"Murder to Excellence"	West; Carter; K. Dean; Larry Griffin Jr.; Scott Mescudi; Quincy Jones; Harvey Mason Jr.; Joel Rosenbaum; Caiphus Semenya; Bill Summers; Mihaela Modorcea; Gabriela Modorcea	Swizz Beatz; S1	5:00
11.	"Made in America" (featuring Frank Ocean)	West; Carter; Joseph; M. Dean; Breaux	Sak Pase; M. Dean^{[b]}; Keith^{[c]}	4:52
12.	"Why I Love You" (featuring Mr Hudson)	West; Carter; M. Dean; Philippe Cerboneschi; Hubert Blanc-Francard; Tony Camillo; Mary Sawyer	West; M. Dean	3:21
Total length:				46:12

Deluxe edition (bonus tracks)
No.	Title	Writer(s)	Producer(s)	Length
13.	"Illest Motherfucker Alive"	West; Carter; M. Dean; Joshua Luellen; Mescudi	Southside; West; M. Dean	5:23
14.	"H.A.M."	West; Carter; Lexus Lewis; M. Dean	Lex Luger; West^{[a]}; M. Dean^{[b]}	4:35
15.	"Primetime"	West; Carter; Ernest Wilson; Russell Simmons; Lawrence Smith; Maureen Reid	No I.D.	3:19
16.	"The Joy" (featuring Curtis Mayfield)	West; Carter; Curtis Mayfield; Peter Phillips; Mescudi; John Cameron; John Zachary	Pete Rock; West; M. Dean^{[b]}; Bhasker^{[b]}	5:17
Total length:				64:37

Notes

- ^{^[a]} signifies a co-producer
- ^{^[b]} signifies an additional producer
- ^{^[c]} signifies an additional vocal producer
- "Lift Off" transitions into "Niggas in Paris".
- "Lift Off" features additional vocals by Seal, Mr Hudson, Don Jazzy, Bankulli and Ricardo Lewis.
- "Gotta Have It" features additional vocals by Kid Cudi.
- "That's My Bitch" features additional vocals by Elly Jackson, Connie Mitchell and Justin Vernon.
- "Welcome to the Jungle" features additional vocals by Swizz Beatz and Acapella Soul.
- "Who Gon Stop Me" features additional vocals by Mr Hudson, Swizz Beatz, and Verse Simmonds.
- "Murder to Excellence" features additional vocals by Kid Cudi.
- "Illest Motherfucker Alive" features additional vocals by Kid Cudi, Bankulli, and Aude Cardona.
- "H.A.M." features additional vocals by Aude Cardona and Jacob Lewis Smith.
- "The Joy" features additional vocals by Pete Rock, Kid Cudi, and Charlie Wilson.

Sample credits

- "No Church in the Wild" contains samples from "K-Scope", written and performed by Phil Manzanera; samples of "Sunshine Help Me", written and performed by Spooky Tooth; and samples of "Don't Tell a Lie About Me (and I Won't Tell the Truth About You)", written and performed by James Brown.
- "Lift Off" contains samples of dialogue from the Apollo 11 launch as spoken by Jack King
- "Niggas in Paris" contains samples of the Reverend W. A. Donaldson recording "Baptizing Scene"; and dialogue between Will Ferrell and Jon Heder from the 2007 comedy film Blades of Glory.
- "Otis" contains samples of "Try a Little Tenderness", written by [Jimmy Campbell and Reg Connelly, Harry M. Woods] and performed by Otis Redding; samples of "Don't Tell a Lie About Me (and I Won't Tell the Truth About You)", written and performed by James Brown; and elements of "Top Billin'", written and performed by Audio Two.
- "Gotta Have It" contains elements of "Don't Tell a Lie About Me (and I Won't Tell the Truth About You)"; samples of "People Get Up and Drive Your Funky Soul"; and elements of "My Thang", written and performed by James Brown.
- "New Day" contains samples of "Feeling Good", written and performed by Nina Simone.
- "That's My Bitch" contains samples of "Get Up, Get Into It, Get Involved", written and performed by James Brown; and samples of "Apache", written and performed by Incredible Bongo Band.
- "Who Gon Stop Me" contains samples of "I Can't Stop", written and performed by Flux Pavilion.
- "Murder to Excellence" contains samples of "LA LA LA", written and performed by The Indiggo Twins; and samples of "Celie Shaves Mr./Scarification" from the 1985 drama film The Color Purple, written and performed by Quincy Jones.
- "Why I Love You" contains samples of "I <3 U So", written and performed by Cassius.
- "Primetime" contains samples of "Action", written and performed by Orange Krush.
- "The Joy" contains samples of "The Makings of You (Live)", written and performed by Curtis Mayfield; and elements of "Different Strokes", written and performed by Syl Johnson.

== Personnel ==
Credits for Watch the Throne adapted from liner notes.

- 88-Keys – producer
- Virgil Abloh – art direction
- Acapella Soul – vocals
- Mat Arnold – assistant
- Bankulli – vocals
- Beyoncé – featured artist
- Jeff Bhasker – producer
- Vincent Biessy – creative input
- Chris "Hitchcock" Chorney – cello
- Carol Corless – package production
- Don Crawley – A&R
- Andrew Dawson – engineer
- Mike Dean – additional production, cello arrangement, engineer, keyboards, mastering, mixing, musician, producer
- Don Jazzy – vocals
- The-Dream – vocals
- Laura Escudé – violin
- Noah Goldstein – engineer, mixing, producer
- Alex Haldi – art producer
- Hit-Boy – producer, programming
- Gaylord Holomalia – assistant
- Elly Jackson – vocals
- Jay-Z – executive producer, primary artist, writer
- Sham "Sak Pase" Joseph – producer
- Kyambo "Hip Hop" Joshua – executive producer
- Kid Cudi – vocals
- Anthony Kilhoffer – additional production, engineer, mixing, producer, programming
- Brent Kolatalo – engineer
- Ken Lewis – additional production, engineer, musician
- Ricardo Lewis – vocals
- LMFAO – mixing, programming
- Mr Hudson – featured artist, vocals
- Connie Mitchell – vocals
- Christian Mochizuki – assistant
- The Neptunes – producer
- Frank Ocean – writer, featured artist
- Q-Tip – additional production, mixing
- Otis Redding – featured artist
- Gee Roberson – executive producer
- Todd Russell – art producer
- S1 – producer
- Lenny S. – A&R
- Seal – vocals
- Pawel Sek – engineer
- Chris Soper – assistant engineer
- Swizz Beatz – producer, vocals
- Bu Thiam – A&R
- Pat Thrall – engineer
- Riccardo Tisci – artwork, creative director
- Scott Townsend – art producer
- Justin Vernon – vocals
- Blair Wells – mixing
- Kanye West – executive producer, primary artist, producer, writer
- Kristen Yiengst – art producer

== Charts ==
=== Weekly charts ===
Chart (2011–2013)	Peak position
Australian Albums (ARIA)	2
Australian Urban Albums (ARIA)	1
Austrian Albums (Ö3 Austria)	12
Belgian Albums (Ultratop Flanders)	7
Belgian Albums (Ultratop Wallonia)	16
Canadian Albums (Billboard)	1
Danish Albums (Hitlisten)	2
Dutch Albums (Album Top 100)	3
Finnish Albums (Suomen virallinen lista)	23
French Albums (SNEP)	10
German Albums (Offizielle Top 100)	2
Irish Albums (IRMA)	5
Italian Albums (FMI)	58
Japanese Albums (Oricon)	14
New Zealand Albums (RMNZ)	4
Norwegian Albums (VG-lista)	1
Polish Albums (ZPAV)	21
Russian Albums (2M)	8
Scottish Albums (OCC)	3
South Korean Albums (Gaon)	57
Spanish Albums (PROMUSICAE)	43
Swedish Albums (Sverigetopplistan)	27
Swiss Albums (Schweizer Hitparade)	1
UK Albums (OCC)	3
UK R&B Albums (OCC)	1
US Billboard 200	1
US Top R&B/Hip-Hop Albums (Billboard)	1
US Top Catalog Albums (Billboard)	19

=== Year-end charts ===
Chart (2011)	Position
Australian Albums (ARIA)	48
Canadian Albums (Billboard)	22
Danish Albums (Hitlisten)	77
UK Albums (OCC)	104
US Billboard 200	14
US Top R&B/Hip-Hop Albums (Billboard)	6

Chart (2012)	Position
Australian Urban Albums (ARIA)	15
UK Albums (OCC)	56
US Billboard 200	51
US Top R&B/Hip-Hop Albums (Billboard)	7

Chart (2013)	Position
Australian Urban Albums (ARIA)	39

Chart (2015)	Position
Australian Urban Albums (ARIA)	91

Chart (2015)	Position
Australian Urban Albums (ARIA)	98

Chart (2016)	Position
Danish Albums (Hitlisten)	98

Chart (2023)	Position
Icelandic Albums (Tónlistinn)	77

=== Decade-end charts ===
Chart (2010–2019)	Position
US Billboard 200	145
US Top R&B/Hip-Hop Albums (Billboard)	30

== Certifications ==
Region	Certification	Certified units/sales
Australia (ARIA)	Platinum	70,000^{^}
Canada (Music Canada)	Platinum	80,000^{^}
Denmark (IFPI Danmark)	2× Platinum	40,000^{‡}
Germany (BVMI)	Gold	100,000^{‡}
Italy (FIMI)	Gold	25,000^{‡}
New Zealand (RMNZ)	3× Platinum	45,000^{‡}
Sweden (GLF)	Gold	20,000^{‡}
United Kingdom (BPI)	Platinum	300,000^{^}
United States (RIAA)	5× Platinum	5,000,000^{‡}
^{^} Shipments figures based on certification alone.^{‡} Sales+streaming figures based on certification alone.

== Release history ==
Region	Date	Format	Label	Ref.
United States	August 8, 2011	Digital download	Roc-A-Fella; Roc Nation; Def Jam	
United States	August 11, 2011	CD	Roc-A-Fella; Roc Nation; Def Jam	

== See also ==
- List of Billboard 200 number-one albums of 2011
- Kanye West albums discography
- Jay-Z albums discography
- Watch the Throne Tour
- Watch the Stove

== Bibliography ==
- Pendergast, Sara; Pendergast, Tom (January 18, 2006). Contemporary Black Biography: Profiles from the International Black Community. Vol. 52 (illustrated ed.). Farmington Hills, Michigan: Gale Research. ISBN 0-7876-7924-0.
- Rollefson, J. Griffith (June 2021). Critical Excess: Watch the Throne and the New Gilded Age. Ann Arbor: University of Michigan Press. ISBN 978-0-472-05487-9.
