= George Diller =

George H. Diller
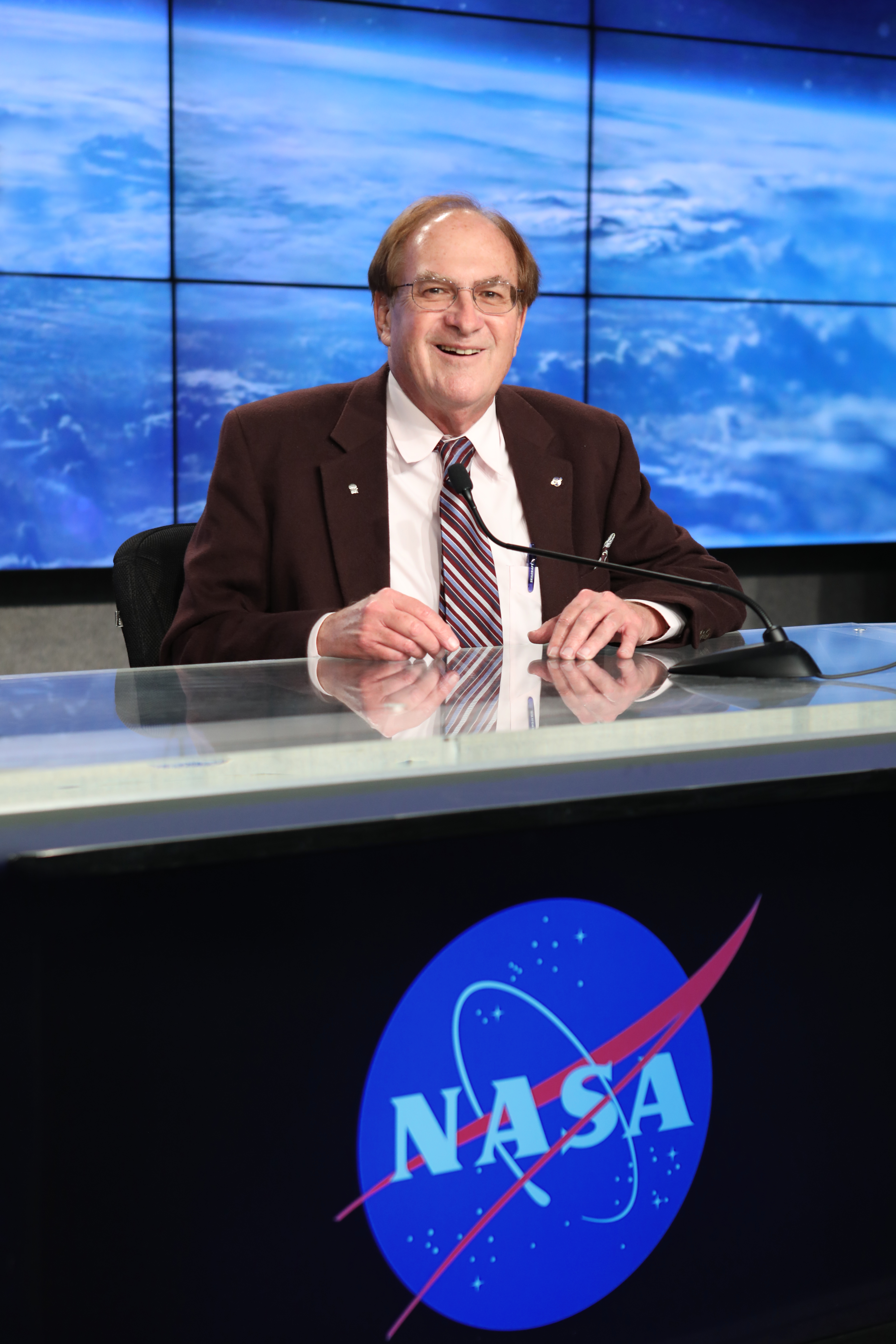
- Diller in April 2017
- Born: Sarasota, Florida
- Occupations: retired public affairs officer at Kennedy Space Center, NASA
- Employer: NASA

George Diller is a retired public relations specialist who worked in the NASA Public Affairs Office (PAO) at the Kennedy Space Center. He provided public announcements and commentary before and during launches from the Kennedy Space Center, including the Space Shuttle and uncrewed spacecraft such as the Mars rovers Spirit and Opportunity, and was known as "The Voice of Kennedy Space Center". Diller provided launch commentary from the launch of STS-28 through STS-135 the final launch of the program. He is also known for his "liftoff line" he gave as the Space Shuttle and other vehicles lifted off the pad.

In addition to shuttle missions, Diller served as commentator during the roll-out, launch delays, and successful launch of Ares I-X in October 2009 as well as planetary missions such as Juno, GRAIL, Mars Science Laboratory, and MAVEN. Diller lists among his favorite moments, the launch of the Hubble Space Telescope aboard STS-31, Magellan and Galileo probes which he had much involvement in, and his first shuttle launch commentary for the STS-27 mission.

Diller's final launch commentary was for the Cygnus CRS OA-7 mission on April 18, 2017. After the launch, Diller interviewed KSC Director and former astronaut Bob Cabana for the NASA TV feed, who pointed out that the launch was Diller's last.

Diller appeared as himself in mission control scenes in the 2015 comedy action made-for-television movie Sharknado 3.

== Background ==
Diller is a native Floridian, having grown up in Sarasota and Clearwater. He graduated from the University of South Florida, Tampa campus first in 1972 and then later in 1977. He has lived in Titusville since October 1978. He worked for 11 years in radio broadcasting at stations in Clearwater, Tampa and Orlando, Florida, and had among his responsibilities covering the Kennedy Space Center as a reporter.

== See also ==
- Jack King
