= Lift Off (song) =

Single by Jay-Z and Kanye West featuring Beyoncé

from the album Watch the Throne
- Released: August 23, 2011
- Studio: Barford Estate (Sydney, Australia)
- Genre: Pop; Hip-hop; R&B
- Length: 4:26
- Label: Roc-A-Fella; Roc Nation; Def Jam
- Songwriters: Kanye West; Jay-Z; Jeff Bhasker; Mike Dean; Bruno Mars; Seal
- Producers: West; Bhasker; Mike Dean; Pharrell (co-producer); Q-Tip (co-producer); Don Jazzy (add. producer)

Jay-Z singles chronology
"Otis" (2011)	"Lift Off" (2011)	"Niggas in Paris" (2011)

Kanye West singles chronology
"Otis" (2011)	"Lift Off" (2011)	"Amen" (2011)

Beyoncé singles chronology
"Best Thing I Never Had" (2011)	"Lift Off" (2011)	"Party" (2011)

"Lift Off" is a song by American rappers Kanye West and Jay-Z featuring the latter's wife, American singer Beyoncé. It was written by rappers, Jeff Bhasker, Mike Dean, Bruno Mars, and Seal, while production was handled by West, Bhasker, and Mike Dean with Pharrell, Q-Tip, and Don Jazzy receiving co- and additional production credits. It was originally released on August 8, 2011 as a track from Jay-Z's and West's collaborative album Watch the Throne before being sent to urban contemporary radio on August 23, 2011. The song was rumored to be released as the lead single from the album containing additional vocals by Bruno Mars. However, Mars never appeared on the song.

Musically, "Lift Off" is a pop song which uses baroque strings. It contains a chorus sung by Beyoncé, while other verses are sung by West and Jay-Z in a rap style. The instrumentation of the song involves synthesizers, martial drums and horns. The song peaked at number one on the South Korea Gaon International Chart and number twenty one on the US Billboard Bubbling Under Hot 100 Singles chart. "Lift Off" was performed live by Jay-Z and Kanye West during their tour in promotion of Watch the Throne titled Watch the Throne Tour (2011–12). The song's instrumental was used as the outro at the end of Jay-Z and Beyoncé's On the Run Tour (2014) and Beyoncé performed her part of the song during her Renaissance World Tour (2023).

== Background and composition ==
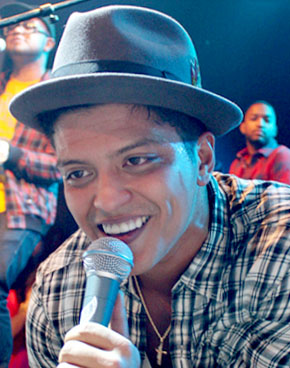
Bruno Mars (pictured), who co-wrote "Lift Off", was rumored to be featured on the track.

"Lift Off" was written by Kanye West, Jay-Z, Jeff Bhasker, Mike Dean, Bruno Mars and Seal, while production was handled by West, Bhasker, Mike Dean, Pharrell, Q-Tip and Don Jazzy. The song was recorded in Sydney, Australia. In early May 2011, it was rumored that Bruno Mars recorded vocals for the song along with Beyoncé and it was reported that the song would be released as the lead single from the album. However, Mars never appeared on the song and Beyoncé sang several lines during the chorus instead. In February, 2011, Kanye West and Jay-Z held a party at the AMNH's Hayden Planetarium. During the party, "Lift Off" was one of the previewed songs. It was described as a "standout track" on the album by a writer for Vulture.

"Lift Off" is a pop song mainly in 6/8 time, which features baroque strings and a chorus sung by Beyoncé, accompanied with synthesizers. The song contains horns and martial drums as Beyoncé sings, "We gon' take it to the moon/ Take it to the stars." Throughout the song West's vocals are enhanced by Auto-Tune in some places. Seal provides backing vocals in the song, which according to Jon Caramanica of The New York Times were "impossible-to-notice". In the song, Beyoncé sings about having "so many scars" and "taking this whole thing to the stars." Jeff Weiss of The Hollywood Reporter found an "old NASA movie sample and Kanye showing off his tattoos and inflexible singing voice." Simon Price of The Independent found neurofunk influences on "Lift Off". The NASA sample is from the Apollo 11 launch as spoken by Jack King. A writer of The Guardian compared the synthesizers in the song with the song "The Final Countdown" (1986) by Swedish rock band Europe.

"Lift Off" was sent to urban contemporary radio stations in the United States on August 23, 2011. According to several media, the song was very popular on Twitter and across the Internet, becoming a trending topic. Billboard magazine claimed that Jay-Z suggested a music video for it could appear.

== Critical reception ==
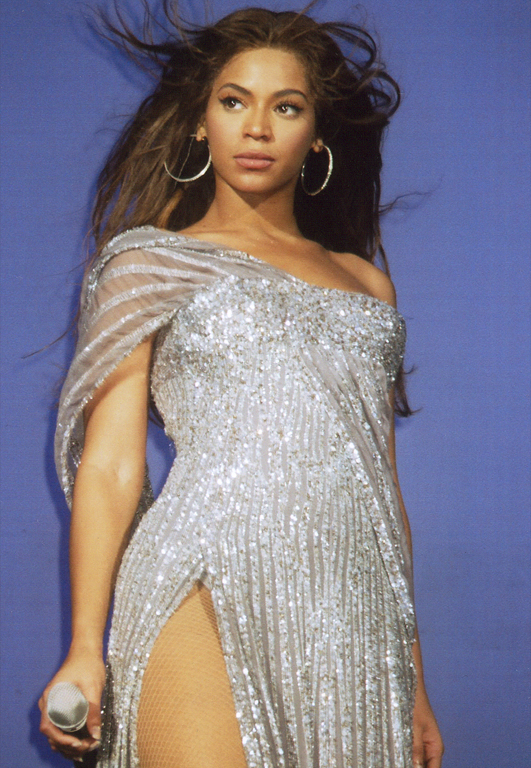
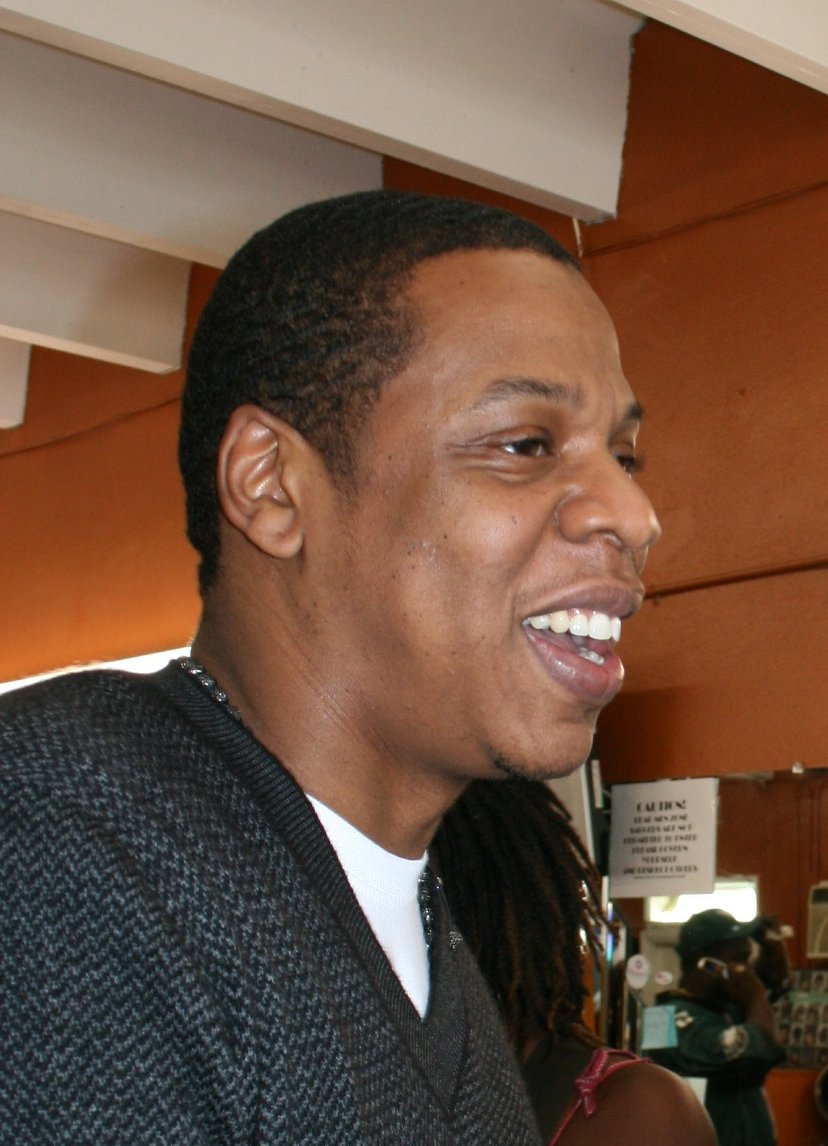
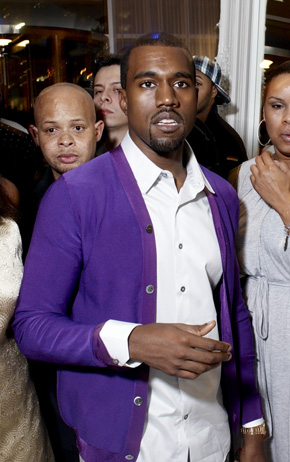
Several critics praised Knowles' (left) vocals in the song, while Jay-Z's (center) and Kanye West's (right) were discussed in a less positive light.

"Lift Off" received mixed to positive reviews from music critics. Before the song was released, MTV News' Alvin Blanco heard a preview of the song and described it as "resounding... sounds like it was tailor-made to be performed in large stadiums." Kyle Anderson of Entertainment Weekly wrote that the song "is rescued by Beyoncé, who whips the chorus with a belt so powerful you'd think it insulted her mother." Slant Magazine's Matthew Cole also praised the song writing, "'Lift Off' is a study in stylized blockbuster excess, with West's best fanfare since Encore eventually being drowned out by a simulated rocket launch that will sound awesome in your car stereo provided it doesn't cause your subwoofers to bust your windows." Rob Harvilla of Spin found a "hook so ridiculous ('We gon take it to the moon / Take it to the stars!') that only Beyoncé could sell it." Michaelangelo Matos of The Guardian praised the song calling it "bombastic". Digital Spy's Robert Copsey put "Lift Off" on his list of "Tracks to download" from the album. Evening Standard's John Aizlewood called the song "rocket-propelled". Rolling Stone's Matthew Perpetua commented: "Beyoncé joins the boys for a synth-heavy banger that takes off like a rocket and eventually arrives at a spacey, blissful resolution. It all but demands a sci-fi music video featuring Beyoncé as a sexy astronaut."

David Amidon of PopMatters praised the hook of the song but said that it contained Jay-Z's "most disturbingly maudlin delivery" since the song "Pray" from American Gangster (2007). Jason Lipshutz of Billboard praised the song, calling it an "uptempo Watch the Throne highlight". Another writer for Billboard, Erika Ramírez, wrote: "Although it feels misplaced in between tracks 1 and 3, the 'stadium status' track is one to look forward to in seeing performed on the WTT tour." Jeff Weiss of The Hollywood Reporter wrote that the song isn't "as Glee-ready as 'Empire State of Mind'." Andy Hutchins writing for The Village Voice said that "'Lift Off' isn't a hit" by concluding "Beyonce dominates; Kanye sounds half-invested at best; and Jay's presence is limited to four bars, one a Dale Earnhardt reference." IGN's Chad Grischow wrote "the song is actually the least compelling of the album, sounding far more interesting when the heavy bass thump finally strips away late for a great piano melody and bongo fuelled beat." Joey Guerra of the Houston Chronicle said that Beyoncé's vocals were "confident" throughout the "grand, athletic and anthemic" song.

The song also received some negative reviews. In his review of Watch the Throne, Andy Kellman of AllMusic wrote, "The lowest point is 'Lift Off', a bombastic mess; West's stillborn, sung vocal clashes against a triumphant hook from Beyoncé, while the behind-the-scenes cast... overcook a regal and rugged, yet ultimately muddled, production". Jayson Rodriguez of XXL said that "'Lift Off' feels too airy on a project this heavy". Chicago Tribune writer Greg Kot described Beyoncé's vocals as "disengaged". Calling the song a "letdown", Tyrone S. Reid of Seattle Post-Intelligencer wrote that "even with Beyoncé supplying the hook, 'Lift Off' is dismal".

== Live performances ==
"Lift Off" was included in the set list of the Watch the Throne Tour (2011–12) by Jay-Z and Kanye West. David Peisner of Spin magazine noted that the rappers didn't sing their lines during the performance, but ad-libbed over the backing track. The Orange County Register's Ben Wener noted that the song was "annoyingly abbreviated: [it] barely registered a blip toward the end". "Lift Off" was also part of the set list of Beyoncé and Jay-Z's co-headlining On the Run Tour (2014) where it was played as the tour's outro following the finale. West performed the song for one of his "Sunday Service" concerts on March 10, 2019. Beyoncé included the song as part of her setlist for the Renaissance World Tour in 2023.

== Chart performance ==
Before its release as a single, the song charted at number eighty one on the Australian Singles Chart for the week of August 15, 2011, and peaked at number one on the South Korea Gaon International Chart. "Lift Off" became the forty third best-selling single in South Korea in 2011. On the chart issue dated August 20, 2011 "Lift Off" debuted at number forty eight on the UK Singles Chart. It did not enter the US Billboard Hot 100, but peaked at number twenty on the August 27, 2011 issue of the Billboard Bubbling Under Hot 100 Singles chart, which acts as a twenty five-song extension to the Hot 100.

== Usage in media ==
In July 2012, American rapper J. Cole sampled "Lift Off" on his song "The Cure".

== Credits and personnel ==
- Produced by Kanye West, Jeff Bhasker and Mike Dean
- Co-produced by Pharrell and Q-Tip
- Additional production by Don Jazzy
- Orchestral engineering: Pawel Sek
- Recorded by Noah Goldstein at Barford Estate, Sydney
- Additional programming by LMFAO, Anthony Kilhoffer and Hit-Boy
- Mixed by Mike Dean, LMFAO and Anthony Kilhoffer at (The Mercer) Hotel, New York
- Additional vocals: Seal, Mr Hudson, Don Jazzy, Bankulli and Ricardo Lewis
- Additional creative input: Vincent "Dj Magnum" Biessy

== Charts ==
=== Weekly charts ===
Chart (2011)	Peak position
Australia (ARIA)	81
South Korea International Singles (Gaon)	1
UK Singles (Official Charts Company)	48
UK R&B (Official Charts Company)	15
US Billboard Bubbling Under Hot 100 Singles	21
US Billboard Rap Digital Songs	27
US Billboard R&B/Hip-Hop Digital Songs	35

=== Year-end charts ===
Chart (2011)	Position
South Korea International Singles (Gaon)	96

== Release history ==
Region	Date	Format	Label	Ref.
United States	August 23, 2011	Urban contemporary radio	Roc-A-Fella; Roc Nation; Def Jam	
