= Jack King (NASA) =

NASA public affairs officer (1931–2015)

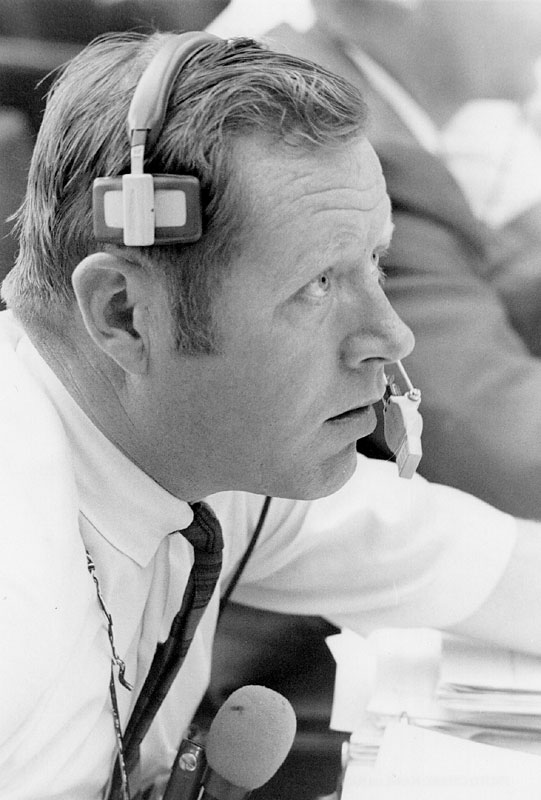
- King at his post for the launch of Apollo 12, November 14, 1969
- Born: February 12, 1931; Brighton, Boston, Massachusetts, U.S.
- Died: June 11, 2015 (aged 84); Cocoa Beach, Florida, U.S.
- Occupations: Spokesman, corporate executive
- Employer(s): Associated Press; NASA; Energy Research and Development Administration; Occidental Petroleum; Fuqua School of Business; United Space Alliance
- Known for: Chief of Public Information and Public Affairs Officer, NASA
- Spouse: Evelyn (m. 1965–2005)
- Children: 3

John William "Jack" King (February 12, 1931 – June 11, 2015) was Chief of Public Information and a Public Affairs Officer for NASA. He is best known for his work as Kennedy Space Center Chief of Public Information during projects Mercury, Gemini and Apollo. As part of this role, he provided public announcements and commentary for several of the mission launches. He is best known for his announcement of the Apollo 11 launch, which earned him the nickname "Voice of Apollo". The well-known commentary from that launch has been reused in songs and advertisements, and was included in a 2011 collection of NASA sounds from historic spaceflights that can be used as ringtones.

== Career ==
King grew up in Boston, the son of a local sportswriter, and attended Boston College. Prior to joining NASA, King worked for the Associated Press. He opened the AP's Cape Canaveral bureau in 1958, when he was 27 years old. King joined NASA in 1960, and served as the Kennedy Space Center's Chief of Public Information from 1960 to 1971, and as NASA's Public Affairs Officer from 1971 to 1975. King announced most of the crewed NASA liftoffs between 1965 and 1971 (with the sole exception of Apollo 13, which was called by his deputy, Chuck Hollinshead); the first crewed launch King called was Gemini 4 in June 1965, and the last was Apollo 15 in July 1971. His best-known launch call was Apollo 11 in July 1969.

After NASA, he spent two years as Director of Public Affairs for the U.S. Energy Research and Development Administration (later part of the United States Department of Energy), and another 15 years as executive vice president of Occidental Petroleum. He was appointed director of communications at the Fuqua School of Business in 1993. In 1997, King returned to Cape Canaveral and the U.S. crewed space program, joining the United Space Alliance, where he served as spokesman.

King officially retired in October 2010, but continued to serve as a volunteer public affairs officer for NASA.

== Sampling in music ==
The notable line of "...20 seconds and counting..." and "... Five, four, three, two, one, zero. All engine running. Lift off, we have a lift off" from the Apollo 11 launch has been used in songs like Lift Off by Kanye West & Jay-Z, and on other works for projects from acts like Def Leppard's Hysteria.

== Personal life ==
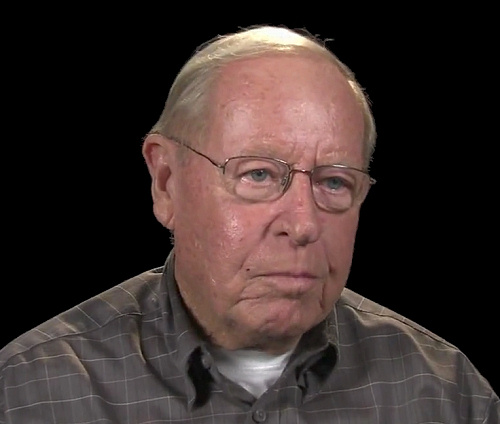
King in 2008

King was a widower, his wife Evelyn having died in 2005. They were married 39 years. He had three children and five grandchildren. He was a Catholic.

King died on June 11, 2015, at the age of 84 of congestive heart failure.

== See also ==
- George Diller
