= No Church in the Wild =

2012 single by Jay-Z and Kanye West featuring Frank Ocean

Single by Jay-Z and Kanye West featuring Frank Ocean and The-Dream

from the album Watch the Throne
- Released: March 20, 2012
- Recorded: 2011
- Studio: The Mercer Hotel
- Genre: Hip-hop
- Length: 4:32
- Label: Roc-A-Fella; Roc Nation; Def Jam
- Songwriters: Shawn Carter; Kanye West; Christopher Breaux; Terius Nash; Charles Njapa; Michael Dean; James Brown; Phillip Manzanera; Joseph Roach; Gary Wright
- Producers: 88-Keys; Kanye West

Jay-Z singles chronology
"Talk That Talk" (2012)	"No Church in the Wild" (2012)	"Clique" (2012)

Kanye West singles chronology
"Gotta Have It" (2011)	"No Church in the Wild" (2012)	"Mercy" (2012)

Frank Ocean singles chronology
"Swim Good" (2011)	"No Church in the Wild" (2012)	"Thinkin Bout You" (2012)

The-Dream singles chronology
"Roc" (2012)	"No Church in the Wild" (2012)	"Exodus 23:1" (2012)

Music video
- "No Church In The Wild" on YouTube

"No Church in the Wild" is a song by American rappers Jay-Z and Kanye West, featuring American singers Frank Ocean and The-Dream, from the former two's collaborative studio album, Watch the Throne (2011). Opening the album, the song explores themes of religion and decadence. The track received highly positive reviews from music critics, who praised Ocean's vocal hooks, the depth of the verses, the cinematic production and the song's power as an opening track.

The track was released as the seventh and final single from Watch the Throne. The song peaked at number 72 on the US Billboard Hot 100 and entered the top 40 on both the US Billboard Hot Rap Songs and Hot R&B/Hip-Hop Songs charts. The song received a music video directed by Romain Gavras released on May 29, 2012. The video features anarchic riot footage and large street fights. The video received positive reviews from critics who praised the visuals and the unique aesthetic presented in the video. The video was shot in Prague, Czech Republic.

Jay-Z and West performed the song as part of the setlist of their Watch the Throne Tour and Ocean performed his portion of the song on several occasions during his November 2011 tour through North America and Europe. The song received a nomination for Best Original or Adapted Song at the 2013 Black Reel Awards, along with two nominations at the 55th Grammy Awards for Best Short Form Music Video and Best Rap/Sung Collaboration, winning the latter.

== Background ==
Jay-Z and Kanye West were close friends and American rappers who have collaborated on several tracks together, such as singles like "Swagga Like Us", "Run This Town", and "Monster". In 2010, they began production and recording on a collaborative record Watch the Throne. Frank Ocean is an R&B singer who released his debut mixtape Nostalgia, Ultra in early 2011 to critical acclaim. The release of the mixtape interested West, who was reported to be a big fan. West invited Ocean to write and sing on two songs on the record. Frank wrote and provided vocals on tracks "No Church in the Wild" and "Made in America" and the songs were recorded in New York. The production of the track was handled by 88-Keys and Kanye West.

88 Keys randomly visited West to say hello, and stumbled upon a Watch the Throne session, in a room with Jay-Z, Q-Tip, No I.D., and engineer Noah Goldstein, 88-Keys played 20 of his beats that were catalogued on SoundCloud. "Everybody in the room just started going crazy," 88-Keys said. An hour later, they had singled out the beat that would become "No Church in the Wild." West told 88-Keys what additions he wanted made, "add an extra kick drum on there ... a heavier bass line and strings". The next day, 88-Keys met Frank Ocean for the first time and heard the chorus as well as an unreleased spoken word intro. Over the next few days, Jay-Z recorded his 16 bars and Kanye recorded an eight-bar verse. For a while, the song remained unfinished but was completed close to the album release.

88-Keys did not hear the final version until Jay-Z showcased it at the invite-only listening session at the Museum of Natural History's planetarium in August 2011. Record producer and singer The-Dream sings a verse on the track using Auto-Tune. The track impacted urban radio as the seventh and final single from Watch the Throne on March 20, 2012.

== Composition ==
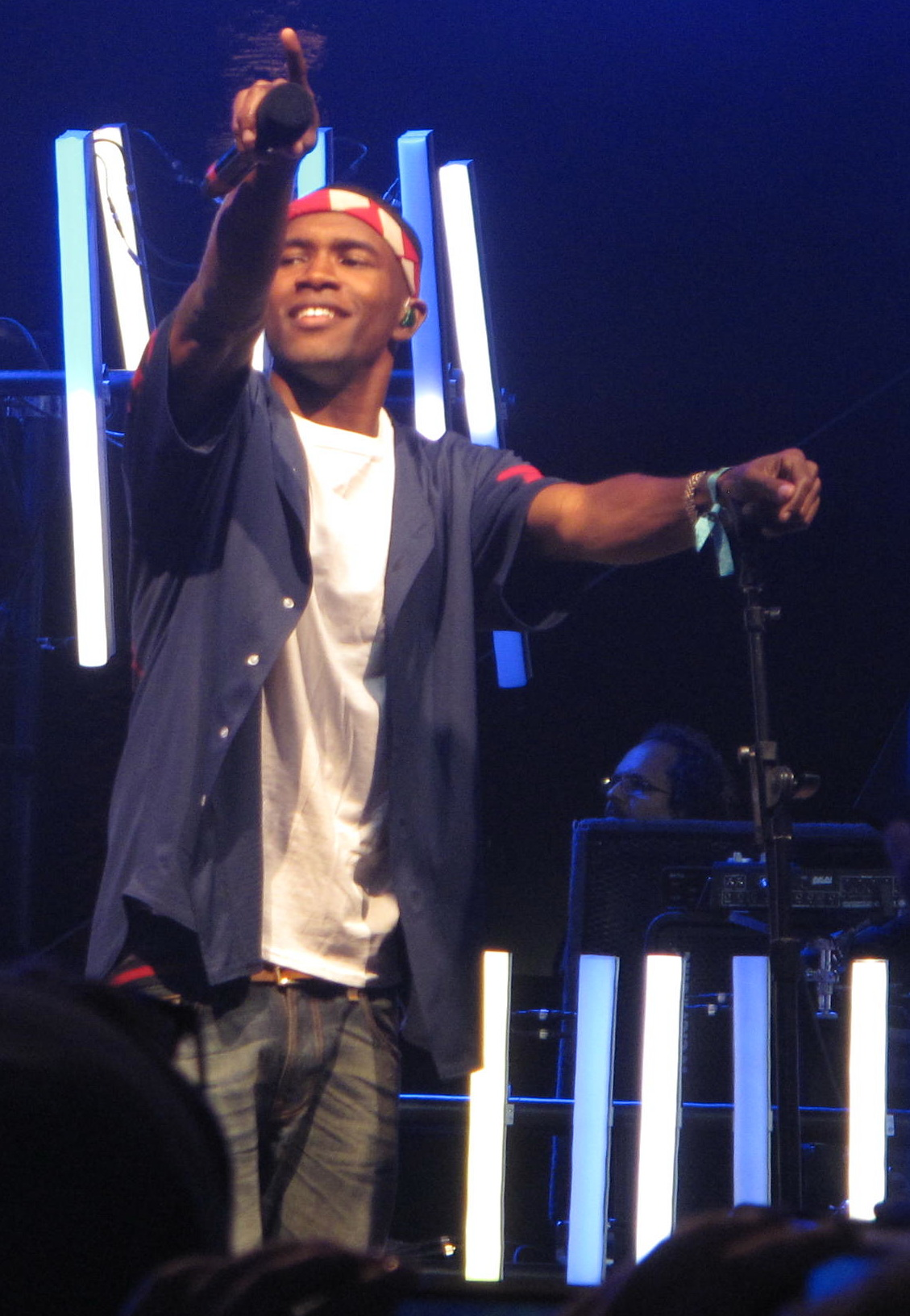
No Church In the Wild is famously known for its chorus, performed by singer Frank Ocean.

"No Church in the Wild" features a cinematic production style and serves as an "ominous opener". According to Billboard, Odd Future singer Frank Ocean and The-Dream lend their voices to the album's "grim opener", which sets the mood with a "gnarled guitar sample". It features a bass-heavy beat with guitar riffs, synthesizers, and drums. The song begins with Frank Ocean's chorus followed by a Jay-Z verse about various topics including philosophy, braggadocio and religion. On Ocean's chorus, Los Angeles Times writer Randall Roberts stated "with it the listener enters a bejeweled realm, one filled with musings on the spoils of riches and the chaos that accompanies it." The chorus "underpins Jay Z's contemplation of the relevance of the clergy and ancient philosophers to someone who makes his living on the streets, while R&B star Frank Ocean questions, "What's a god to a non-believer who don't believe in anything?". The chorus then repeats and The-Dream performs a bridge, preceding West's verse where he boasts "You will not control the threesome". West's verse included references to Socrates, the perils of monogamy, "implied regicide" and both rappers "take turns describing a night of decadence that leaves blood on the coliseum walls". The song contains samples from "K-Scope" as performed by Phil Manzanera, "Sunshine Help Me" as performed by Spooky Tooth and "Don't Tell a Lie About Me and I Won't Tell the Truth About You" as performed by James Brown. According to Alexis Petridis of The Guardian, the track utilizes "unlikely samples" with "Ocean's haunting vocal against Roxy Music's Phil Manzanera playing a tricksy prog riff".

== Promotion ==
The track was performed by West and Jay on their Watch the Throne Tour. Ocean performed his hook of the song at some of the performances during his 2011 concert series through the United States and Europe. The song was used in the promotional advertising and the end credits for the film Safe House, the promo advertising for The Great Gatsby, and in an advertising series for the 2013 Dodge Dart automobile.

=== Music video ===
A music video was filmed in late April 2012 in the areas surrounding Prague's Jan Palach Square and National Theatre, as well as near Škoda Palace in Jungmannova Street, by the Greek-French director Romain Gavras. There were two hundred extras, divided into police and rioters. The final video was released on May 29, 2012. The video is "influenced by the protests and civil unrest that took place all across the country". The video's final shot bears similarity to an image from visual artist UnkleLuc's project The Wild. Rolling Stone reported that the "clip for 'No Church in the Wild' depicts a grim clash between a large number of protesters and heavily armed and violent riot police".

=== Nominations ===
"No Church in the Wild" received three nominations at the 2012 UK Music Video Awards; Best International Urban Video, Best Cinematography in a Video, and Best Telecine in a Video.

Credits

- Director: Romain Gavras
- Production Company: Somesuch & Co
- Producer: Mourad Belkeddar
- Line Producer: Charlotte Marmion
- Director of Photography: Mattias Montero
- Production Designer: Jan Houllevigue
- Editor: Walter Mauriot
- Stylist: Hannah Edwards
- Colorist: Simon Bourne
- Local Production: Unit + Sofa

== Reception ==
"No Church in the Wild" received mostly positive reviews from music critics and was often described as a highlight from Watch the Throne. Andy Gill of The Independent stated "the best track is surely the opener 'No Church in the Wild', whose deep, detuned twang groove, over a marching organ motif, is the most striking music on the album, promising rather more than the rest of the record is able to deliver. Both this and the other stand-out track, "Made In America", feature assured vocal refrains from Frank Ocean, while the two rappers muse over familiar themes of loyalty, sexuality and maternal solidarity." Rolling Stone claimed that it is one of the most musically impressive songs on Watch the Throne and described the production as an "ominous, darkly funky bass groove and chilly synths tailor-made for Ocean's off-kilter crooning". Matt Popkin from American Songwriter praised Jay-Z's verse and the menacing vibe of the song. NOW claimed that the "uncomfortably visceral opener 'No Church In The Wild' – with its filthy Phil Manzanera guitar sample and mournful Frank Ocean chorus – cuts to the heart of Watch The Throne's power dynamic." However, PopMatters criticized that the verses "feel a little out of focus compared to the hook and beat's opulence". Sputnikmusic's Tyler Fisher commented "88-Keys creates a positively epic opening track with 'No Church in the Wild', full of creeping guitar riffs and pulsating bass, building tension that simply never releases." Rolling Stone named the track the sixth best song of the year, reporting that "with Hov and Yeezy getting deep into arcane theology, this track is just another high".

Dagbladet named it the 12th best song of 2011. In 2019, XXL named the song as one of the 25 best Hip-Hop album intro's since 2000.

== Media usage ==
- The song was used in both the trailer, and a scene in the film, for the 2013 film The Great Gatsby.
- "No Church in the Wild" was featured in a UFC 189 promo for fight between Conor McGregor and José Aldo.
- The track was featured in the trailer and the film of the 2012 film Safe House.
- "No Church in the Wild" was used in an Audi Quattro commercial.
- The song is featured at the beginning of the "Out of Our Own" episode, part 1 of the BBC Silent Witness, series 18.
- "No Church in the Wild" appeared in a Dodge Dart (PF) advertisement entitled: How to Change Cars Forever, that featured American footballer Tom Brady.
- The remix version of the song was used in the 2017 Indian Malayalam film Comrade in America titled "Kerala Manninayi". A credit was given to Kanye West and Jay-Z in the video of the song as inspiration.
- The song was used in the trailer for Gladiator II.

== Credits and personnel ==
- Produced by 88-Keys, Kanye West and Mike Dean
- Frank Ocean and The-Dream's vocal production by Om'Mas Keith
- Recorded by Noah Goldstein, Ken Lewis and Brent Kolatalo
- Additional recording: Pat Thrall
- Mixed by Mike Dean
- Additional instruments: Ken Lewis
- Additional vocals: The-Dream
- Mixed and recorded at The Mercer Hotel

== Charts ==
=== Weekly charts ===
Weekly chart performance for "No Church in the Wild"
Chart (2011–14)	Peak position
Belgium (Ultratop 50 Flanders)	46
Belgium Urban (Ultratop Flanders)	19
Canada Hot 100 (Billboard)	92
France (SNEP)	171
Italy (FIMI)	52
Mexico Ingles Airplay (Billboard)	34
South Korea (Gaon Chart)	72
UK Hip Hop/R&B (Official Charts)	10
UK Singles (Official Charts)	37
US Billboard Hot 100	72
US Hot R&B/Hip-Hop Songs (Billboard)	31
US Hot Rap Songs (Billboard)	20
US Adult R&B Songs (Billboard)	26

== Certifications ==
Certifications for "No Church in the Wild"
Region	Certification	Certified units/sales
Italy (FIMI)	Gold	25,000^{‡}
New Zealand (RMNZ)	Platinum	30,000^{‡}
United Kingdom (BPI)	Platinum	600,000^{‡}
United States (RIAA)	3× Platinum	3,000,000^{‡}
Streaming
Denmark (IFPI Danmark)	Platinum	1,800,000^{†}
^{‡} Sales+streaming figures based on certification alone.^{†} Streaming-only figures based on certification alone.
