= Watch the Throne Tour =

2011–12 concert tour by Jay-Z and Kanye West

- Tour by Jay-Z and Kanye West
- Associated album: Watch the Throne; My Beautiful Dark Twisted Fantasy
- Start date: October 29, 2011
- End date: June 22, 2012
- Legs: 2
- No. of shows: 57
- Box office: $75.4 million ($105.74 million in 2025 dollars)
Jay-Z tour chronology
The Home & Home Tour (2010)	Watch the Throne Tour (2011–12)	Legends of the Summer (2013)
Kanye West tour chronology
Fame Kills: Starring Kanye West and Lady Gaga (2009–10; cancelled)	Watch the Throne Tour (2011–12)	The Yeezus Tour (2013–14)

The Watch the Throne Tour was a co-headlining concert tour by American rappers Jay-Z and Kanye West that began on October 28, 2011, in Atlanta and continued until June 22, 2012, with its final show scheduled in Birmingham. Originally scheduled for 23 performances, the tour was expanded to 34 performances in North America due to heavy demand for tickets; 29 shows were confirmed in the United States with 5 shows in Canada. Following massive success in the United States and Canada, Jay-Z & Kanye West announced the European leg of the tour on February 21, 2012, which featured 23 performances, bringing the number of shows to 57 at the time.

Following the Glow in the Dark Tour, it marked West's first concert tour after four years, excluding his ultimately cancelled Fame Kills tour with Lady Gaga. It followed Jay-Z's opening act for U2 at the U2 360° Tour and his The Home & Home Tour with Eminem. The concerts, which had no opening act of their own, were in support of West and Jay-Z's 2011 album Watch the Throne, with most of the album's track-list performed, such as singles "Otis", "Lift Off", "Niggas in Paris" and concert opener "H•A•M". Additional West singles like "Gold Digger", "Stronger", "Heartless" and "All of the Lights" and Jay-Z singles like "Izzo (H.O.V.A.)", "99 Problems", "Run This Town", and "Empire State of Mind" were also performed.

The critical and box office performance of the tour received rave reviews, with critics praising the production value, the elaborate stage design, and the large string of successful singles featured. The tour had very little promotion before its premiere, with the exception being behind-the-scene concert footage sponsored by Voyr. It grossed $48.3 million in North America in 2011 and $25.4 million in Europe in 2012. Overall, the tour would gross $75.4 million ($103.27 million in 2024 dollars).

== Background ==
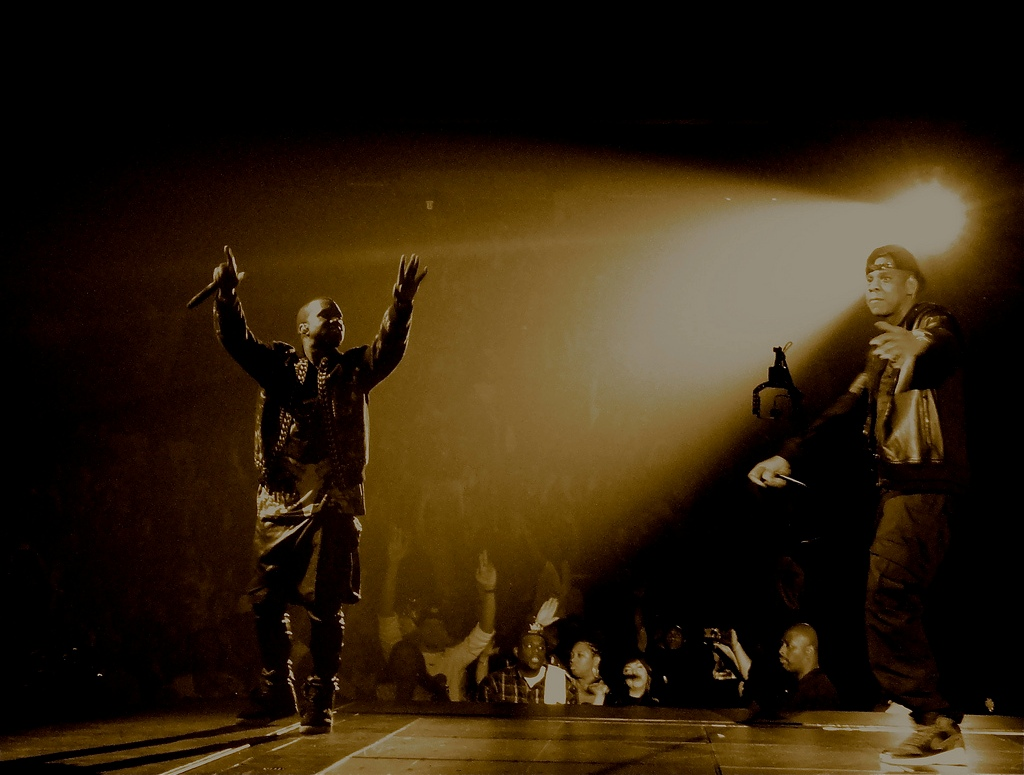
West and Jay-Z on in Greensboro, North Carolina.

On July 25, 2011, Jay-Z and West announced the release of their collaborative studio album Watch the Throne and an accompanying tour. The album was set for release on August 8, with tickets simultaneously being made available for the Watch the Throne Tour's North American leg from September 22 to November 3, 2011. On February 21, 2012, Jay-Z and West announced 12 European tour dates running from May 20 to June 13. Three tour dates at The O2 Arena in London and one at Manchester Arena were added three days later, starting the tour earlier on May 18 with one of the London concerts. On March 5, 2012, Jay-Z and West added dates in Birmingham, Sheffield, and Cologne after a strong response to their announcement of the tour's European leg, running up until June 22.

== Concert synopsis ==
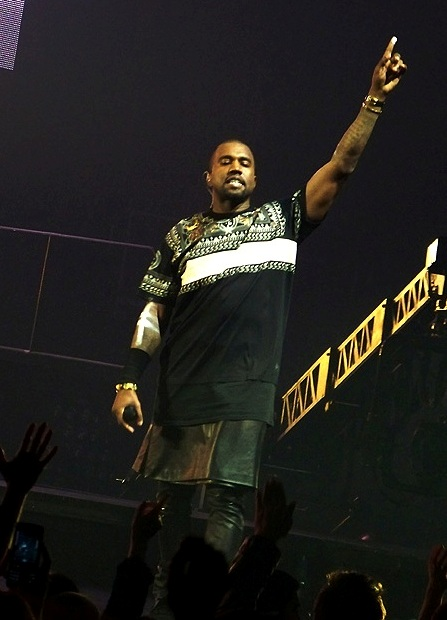
Kanye West singles like "Jesus Walks", "Gold Digger", "Stronger", "Good Life", "Heartless", "All of the Lights", and "Runaway" were performed during the tour.

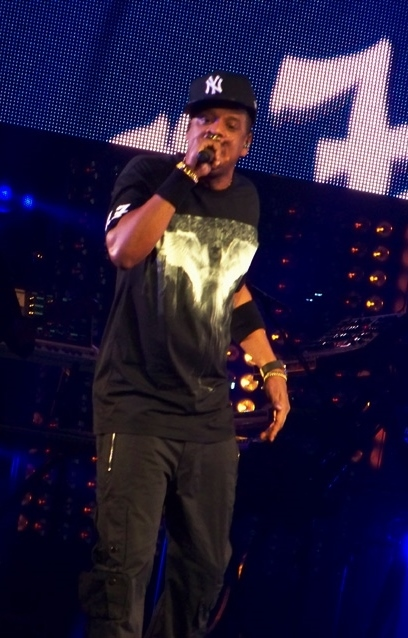
Jay-Z singles like "Nigga What, Nigga Who (Originator 99)", "Hard Knock Life (Ghetto Anthem)", "Izzo (H.O.V.A.)", "99 Problems", "Dirt off Your Shoulder", "Run This Town", and "Empire State of Mind" were performed during the tour.

The tour's shows began with West and Jay-Z "emerging on two cube-shaped mini stages to the operatic sounds of "H•A•M". Following that, "Who Gon Stop Me" was the next song, with "Otis" being performed with "a Givenchy – designed American flag flashing on the stage's main screens" after an extended introduction using "Try a Little Tenderness" by Otis Redding. Afterwards, West left the stage, and Jay-Z performed songs like "Where I'm From" and "Empire State of Mind", encouraging the audience to sing along. Kanye returned to the stage afterwards, performing his own songs like "Power", "Touch the Sky", and "Gold Digger", with the two of them eventually performing songs like "Run This Town", "Monster" and the remix of "Diamonds from Sierra Leone" together, where Jay-Z repeatedly told the crowd to "put your diamonds up", the sign for Roc Nation.

Mixing hits from both artists discographies like "Can't Tell Me Nothing", "Good Life", "Izzo (H.O.V.A.)" and "99 Problems", the show then segued into West performing "Runaway" and "Heartless", which has been described as an "emotional highlight of the show". The most energetic part of the show has been reported to be during "Niggas in Paris" as "the track's Will Ferrell intro ("We're gonna skate to one song and one song only") brought on the moment that everyone was waiting for." "Niggas in Paris" was originally performed three times in a row, but as the tour progressed, the song was regularly performed up to ten times in succession, with the record being 11 times in Paris, France. Following other Watch the Throne tracks like "No Church in the Wild" and "Lift Off", the show ended with "Encore" and an rendition of "Made in America", complete with images of Martin Luther King Jr. and "sweet brother" Malcolm X flashing on the big screen. USA Today described the stage design:

This show was visually spectacular. There was a main, T-shaped stage where both entertainers performed together, and also two cube-shaped mini stages, one at each end of the arena, that rose and lowered at various points during the show. West and Jay-Z performed separately on these cubes, which showed various images (a snarling Rottweiler, a swimming shark) at different points of the show. Fireballs the size of car tires shot from the floor toward the ceiling during some performances. Two large video screens behind the main stage showed appropriate images during the performances; a virtually non-stop laser light show added to the oomph factor.

== Reception ==
Critical reception towards the tour was positive. MTV News gave the opening show a good review, writing "While the WTT album has been noted for its opulent displays of wealth, Hov and Yeezy's show will be marked by the duo's overabundance of hit records." USA Today praised the duo's ability to get the audience excited, stating "at one point, as Jay-Z and West performed Niggas in Paris from their new hit CD, "Watch the Throne", West exhorted the audience to "Bounce! Bounce!" The resulting stomping had Philips Arena rocking and shaking in a way that it hasn't for the Hawks in a long time." Rap-Up mused "it was a crowning moment for Jay-Z and Kanye West as they kicked off the Watch the Throne tour to a packed house at Philips Arena in Atlanta on Friday night. The hip-hop kings, collectively known as The Throne, opened the most anticipated hip-hop tour of the year with a bang." Idolator stated that the tour featured "an epic set list that featured selections from each artist's own behemoth catalog of hits as well as their Watch The Throne collaborations." The tour has grossed $48.3 million so far by the end of 2011, making it the highest grossing hip-hop tour and the eighth highest-grossing tour of 2011. In 2017, Rolling Stone listed it in its list of "The 50 Greatest Concerts of the Last 50 Years". In 2019, Consequence of Sound named it the third best tour of the 2010s. The tour won best live stage show at the 2012 International Laser Display Association Awards

In a 2011 interview with Rolling Stone, comedian Chris Rock said;

"This might be the greatest show I ever saw. It's the equivalent of the Billy Joel-Elton John tour, but if they did it in 1979, when the songs were hot!"

== Set list ==
The following set list was performed on May 21, 2012 in London, England and is not intended to represent a majority of the performances throughout the tour.

1. "H•A•M"
2. "Who Gon Stop Me"
3. "Otis"
4. "Welcome to the Jungle"
5. "Gotta Have It"
6. "Where I'm From"
7. "Nigga What, Nigga Who (Originator 99)"
8. "Can't Tell Me Nothing"
9. "All Falls Down"
10. "Flashing Lights"
11. "Jesus Walks"
12. "Diamonds from Sierra Leone"(Remix)
13. "Public Service Announcement"
14. "U Don't Know"
15. "Run This Town"
16. "Monster"
17. "Power"
18. "New Day"
19. "Hard Knock Life (Ghetto Anthem)"
20. "Izzo (H.O.V.A.)"
21. "Empire State of Mind"
22. "Runaway"
23. "Heartless"
24. "Stronger"
25. "On to the Next One"
26. "Dirt off Your Shoulder"
27. "I Just Wanna Love U"
28. "That's My Bitch"
29. "Good Life"
30. "Touch the Sky"
31. "All of the Lights"
32. "Big Pimpin'"
33. "Gold Digger"
34. "99 Problems"
35. "No Church in the Wild"
36. "Lift Off"
37. Niggas in Paris

Encore

38. "Niggas in Paris" (several times)

== Tour dates ==
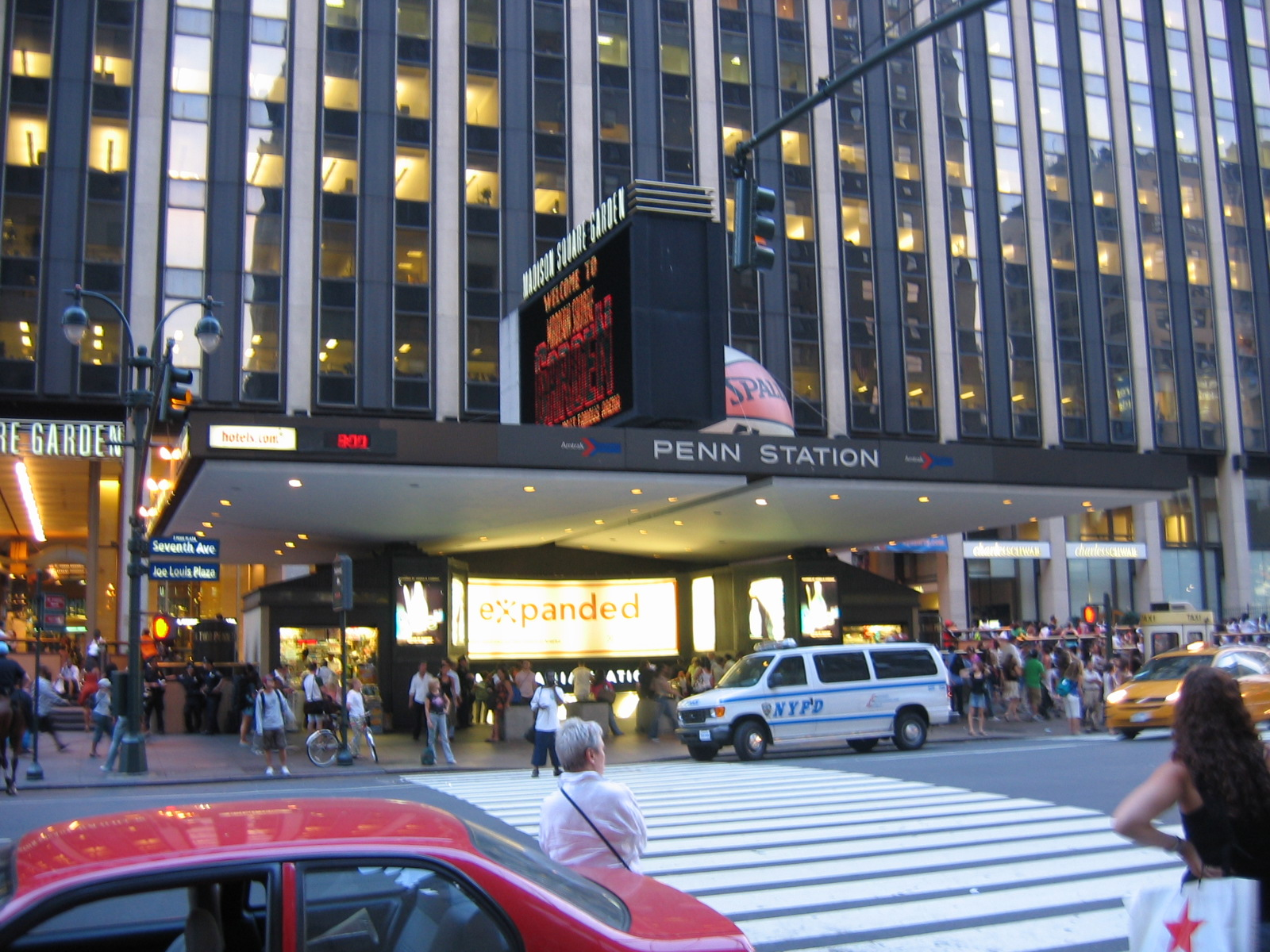
The duo performed two shows at the historic Madison Square Garden on November 7 and 8.

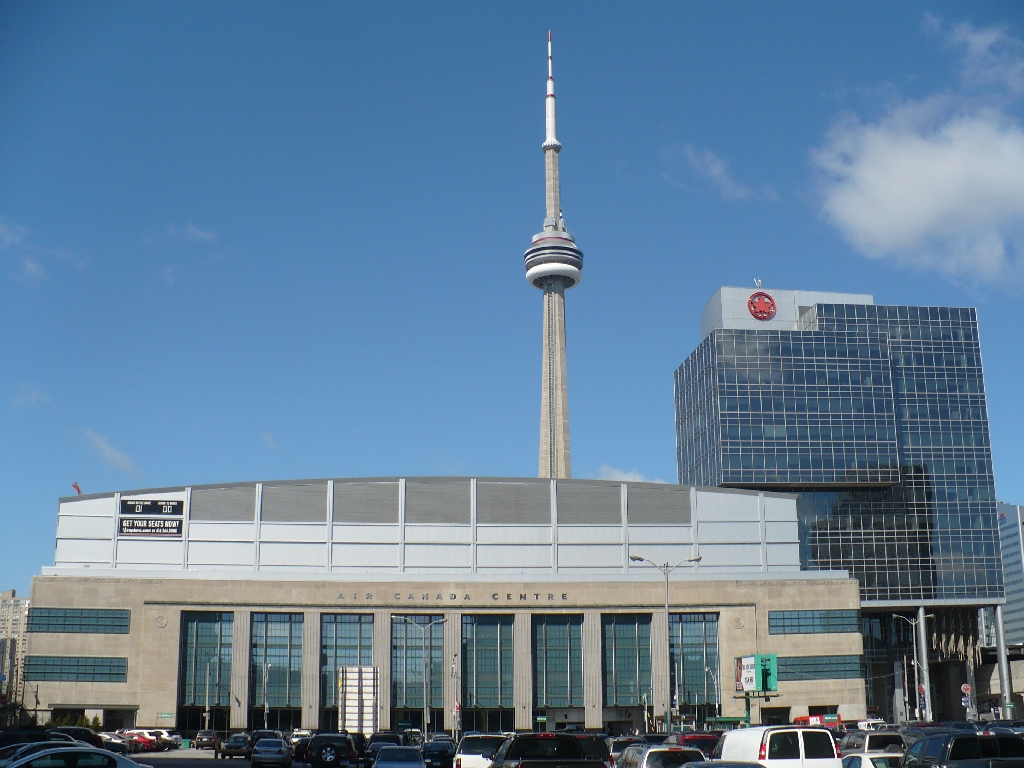
Two Canadian shows of the tour took place at the Air Canada Centre.

Date	City	Country	Venue
North America
October 28, 2011	Atlanta	United States	Philips Arena
October 29, 2011	Atlanta	United States	Philips Arena
October 30, 2011	Greensboro	United States	Greensboro Coliseum Complex
November 1, 2011	Baltimore	United States	1st Mariner Arena
November 2, 2011	Philadelphia	United States	Wells Fargo Center
November 3, 2011	Washington, D.C.	United States	Verizon Center
November 5, 2011	East Rutherford	United States	Izod Center
November 6, 2011	East Rutherford	United States	Izod Center
November 7, 2011	New York City	United States	Madison Square Garden
November 8, 2011	New York City	United States	Madison Square Garden
November 14, 2011	Sunrise	United States	BankAtlantic Center
November 15, 2011	Miami	United States	American Airlines Arena
November 18, 2011	Uncasville	United States	Mohegan Sun Arena
November 19, 2011	Atlantic City	United States	Boardwalk Hall
November 21, 2011	Boston	United States	TD Garden
November 22, 2011	Montreal	Canada	Bell Centre
November 23, 2011	Toronto	Canada	Air Canada Centre
November 24, 2011	Toronto	Canada	Air Canada Centre
November 26, 2011	Auburn Hills	United States	The Palace of Auburn Hills
November 27, 2011	Pittsburgh	United States	Consol Energy Center
November 29, 2011	Kansas City	United States	Sprint Center
November 30, 2011	Chicago	United States	United Center
December 1, 2011	Chicago	United States	United Center
December 3, 2011	New Orleans	United States	New Orleans Arena
December 5, 2011	Houston	United States	Toyota Center
December 6, 2011	Dallas	United States	American Airlines Center
December 9, 2011	Las Vegas	United States	MGM Grand Garden Arena
December 11, 2011	Los Angeles	United States	Staples Center
December 12, 2011	Los Angeles	United States	Staples Center
December 13, 2011	Los Angeles	United States	Staples Center
December 14, 2011	San Jose	United States	HP Pavilion
December 16, 2011	Tacoma	United States	Tacoma Dome
December 17, 2011	Vancouver	Canada	Rogers Arena
December 18, 2011	Vancouver	Canada	Rogers Arena
Europe
May 18, 2012	London	England	The O_{2} Arena
May 19, 2012	London	England	The O_{2} Arena
May 20, 2012	London	England	The O_{2} Arena
May 21, 2012	London	England	The O_{2} Arena
May 22, 2012	London	England	The O_{2} Arena
May 24, 2012	Zürich	Switzerland	Hallenstadion
May 26, 2012	Herning	Denmark	Jyske Bank Boxen
May 28, 2012	Oslo	Norway	Telenor Arena
May 29, 2012	Stockholm	Sweden	Ericsson Globe
May 30, 2012	Malmö	Sweden	Malmö Arena
June 1, 2012	Paris	France	Palais Omnisports de Paris-Bercy
June 2, 2012	Paris	France	Palais Omnisports de Paris-Bercy
June 3, 2012	Antwerp	Belgium	Sportpaleis
June 5, 2012	Frankfurt	Germany	Festhalle Frankfurt
June 8, 2012	Dublin	Ireland	The O_{2}
June 9, 2012	Dublin	Ireland	The O_{2}
June 11, 2012	Manchester	England	Manchester Arena
June 12, 2012	Manchester	England	Manchester Arena
June 13, 2012	Birmingham	England	LG Arena
June 15, 2012	Arnhem	Netherlands	GelreDome
June 16, 2012	Cologne	Germany	Lanxess Arena
June 18, 2012	Paris	France	Palais Omnisports de Paris-Bercy
June 21, 2012	Sheffield	England	Motorpoint Arena
June 22, 2012	Birmingham	England	LG Arena

=== Box office score data ===
Venue	City	Tickets sold / available	Gross revenue
Philips Arena	Atlanta	27,330 / 27,330 (100%)	$2,888,792
1st Mariner Arena	Baltimore	10,758 / 10,758 (100%)	$961,108
Verizon Center	Washington, D.C.	14,085 / 14,085 (100%)	$1,927,601
Madison Square Garden	New York City	27,649 / 27,649 (100%)	$4,330,393
BankAtlantic Center	Sunrise	11,826 / 11,837 (~100%)	$1,217,610
Mohegan Sun Arena	Uncasville	3,894 / 4,468 (87%)	$686,510
Boardwalk Hall	Atlantic City	12,746 / 12,746 (100%)	$1,601,216
Bell Centre	Montreal	10,856 / 10,856 (100%)	$1,458,070
Air Canada Centre	Toronto	30,503 / 30,503 (100%)	$4,109,270
The Palace of Auburn Hills	Auburn Hills	14,097 / 14,097 (100%)	$1,365,830
Consol Energy Center	Pittsburgh	11,957 / 11,957 (100%)	$902,105
American Airlines Center	Dallas	14,608 / 14,608 (100%)	$1,336,187
Staples Center	Los Angeles	42,332 / 42,332 (100%)	$5,104,455
Tacoma Dome	Tacoma	10,861 / 11,443 (94%)	$1,088,898
The O2 Arena	London	77,117 / 81,955 (94%)	$6,705,970
Sportpaleis	Antwerp	16,831 / 16,847 (~100%)	$982,923
TOTAL		386,445 / 401,244 (96%)	$40,079,477

== Members ==
The following individuals were members of the Watch The Throne tour:

- Mike Dean
- Mano
- Omar Edwards
- Noah Goldstein
- Che Pope
- Renelou Padora
- Don C
- Ibn Jasper
- Izvor Zivkovic
- Virgil Abloh
- Alex Rosenberg
- Matthew Williams
- Elon Rutberg
- Fabien Montique
- Tracey Mills
- Caitlyn Carpenter
- Hannah Christian
- Lara Holmes
- Ricky Anderson
- Sakiya Sandifer
- Justin Saunders
- Drew Goodman

== Credits ==
- Creative Direction & Set Design: Kanye West & Es Devlin
- Additional Set Design: Bruce Rodgers
- Lighting Designer: Nick Whitehouse & John McGuire
- Video Designer: Geodezik

== Notes ==
- London hosted the most Watch the Throne concerts (5), followed by Los Angeles and Paris (both 3).
- Rihanna made a special guest appearance on the third date (20 May) in London, performing her vocals on "Run This Town" and "All of the Lights". She is the only artist to have made a guest appearance on the tour.
- During the last date in London (22 May), Kanye West performed "Mercy" live for the first time.
- During the last date in Paris (18 June), at the 'Palais Omnisports de Bercy', they set a record, performing "Niggas in Paris" 12 times during approximately one hour.
- During the last date in Birmingham (22 June), Beyoncé and Kim Kardashian participated in the crowd mosh pit during the performance of "Niggas in Paris".
