= List of footwear designers =

This is a list of notable dedicated footwear designers.

- Ni Luh Djelantik (Shoe)
- Adam Derrick (To Boot New York)
- Alberta Ferretti
- Aldo
- Alexander Wang
- Alexander White (designer)
- Alexandre Birman
- André Perugia
- Badgley Mischka
- Balenciaga
- Bally
- Balmain
- Barker Black
- Beatrix Ong
- Bebe
- Bella Belle Shoes
- Betsey Johnson
- Bionda Castana
- Blumarine
- Bottega Veneta
- Brian Atwood
- Bruno Magli
- Calvin Klein
- Cesare Paciotti
- Chanel
- Charlotte Olympia
- Christian Dior
- Christian Lacroix
- Christian Louboutin
- Christian Siriano
- Chuck Taylor
- Collin Thompson
- Common Projects
- Daniella Shevel
- D Squared
- Dolce & Gabbana
- Edward Rayne
- Emilio Pucci
- Emma Hope
- Fendi
- Giambattista Valli
- Giuseppe Zanotti
- Givenchy
- Gucci
- Guess
- Herman Delman
- Hervé Leger
- Irregular Choice
- Jimmy Choo
- John Fluevog
- John Hoke
- Joker's Closet
- Kurt Geiger
- L.A.M.B.
- Lanvin
- Liam Fahy
- Louis Vuitton
- Manolo Blahnik
- Maud Frizon
- Miu Miu
- Monika Chiang
- Monique Lhuillier
- Moya Bowler
- Natacha Marro
- Nicholas Kirkwood
- Nine West
- NoBull
- Olga Peterson
- Patrick Cox
- Paul Andrew
- Philipp Plein
- Prabal Gurung
- Prada
- Pura Lopez
- Ralph & Russo
- Rene Caovilla
- Roberto Cavalli
- Roger Vivier
- Rupert Sanderson
- Ruthie Davis
- Salvatore Ferragamo
- Sam Edelman
- Sergio Rossi
- Sophia Webster
- Stefi Talman
- Steve Madden
- Stuart Weitzman
- Susan Bennis
- Timberland (company)
- Ted Baker
- Terry de Havilland
- The Chelsea Cobbler
- Tinker Hatfield
- Tod's
- Tom Ford
- Valentino
- Vanessa Noel
- Versace
- Via Spiga
- Walter Steiger
- Warren Edwards
- Wolf & St.Ozzy
- Yves Saint Laurent
- Zara

== See also ==
- List of fashion designers
- List of shoe styles
