= On the Run Tour: Beyoncé and Jay-Z (TV program) =

- HBO special promotional poster
- Genre: Concert
- Directed by: Jonas Åkerlund
- Starring: Beyoncé; Jay-Z
- Country of origin: United States
- Original language: English

Production
- Production location: Stade de France
- Running time: 155 minutes
- Production company: Black Dog Films

Original release
- Network: HBO
- Release: September 20, 2014

On the Run Tour: Beyoncé and Jay Z is a 2014 concert special which documents the September 12 and 13, 2014, shows of American singer-songwriter Beyoncé and rapper Jay-Z joint co-headlining venture On the Run Tour. Filmed at Stade de France in Paris, France, the special was directed by Swedish music video director Jonas Åkerlund and produced by HBO. It was broadcast on the channel on September 20, a week after the tour had finished. Prior to its airing, various trailers and short clips consisting of footage from the special were shared online. A video trilogy was filmed by photographer Dikayl Rimmasch and was scheduled to be released prior to the special's premiere; however, only its first part was posted online and removed from the Internet afterwards.

Several music critics highlighted the duo's collaborative performances and their onstage intimacy and interactions. Nicki Minaj made an appearance for the performance of the remix version of "Flawless", while "Young Forever" and "Halo" were the closing number. The aforementioned medley was released online on September 21, 2014. On the day of its airing, On the Run Tour: Beyoncé and Jay Z was watched by 888,000 viewers. The special was nominated in the category for Best Music Film at the 57th Annual Grammy Awards held in 2015.

== Background and release ==
The On the Run Tour was a co-headlining stadium concert tour by American recording artist Beyoncé and her husband, rapper Jay-Z. The venture was announced in late April 2014 following several weeks of speculations; initially 16 concerts were announced in North America through June, July and August. Three more dates were later added in that continent and on June 13, 2014, two dates of the tour in Paris, France were announced, set to be performed at the Stade de France on September 12 and 13, 2014. The dates were the exclusive, only European shows of the On the Run Tour. Rapper Nicki Minaj appeared during both of the concerts, joining Beyoncé on stage.

In July 2014, it was announced that HBO would exclusively air the On the Run Tour in full at some point in September, following the upcoming filming of the concerts in Paris, France at the scheduled September 12 and 13, 2014 shows in the city. The shows were shot by Swedish music video director Jonas Åkerlund. President of the network, Michael Lombardo, stated in a press release, "This is a major musical event that belongs on HBO, it's going to be a night to remember." Following the announcement of the upcoming airing of the tour, a promotional trailer was released on HBO's official YouTube channel, showing professional footage and segments of the On the Run Tour.

On July 22, 2014, Beyoncé confirmed the air date of the special to be September 20, 2014, on her official Facebook page, along with another short video trailer. HBO used 20 different cameras to record the two shows and various special effect were later used, such as slow motion, quick cuts and aerial views. In August 2014, another promotional video was uploaded to HBO's YouTube account. The trailer began with Beyoncé dressed as a jazz singer staring down a captive Jay-Z in the audience, whilst singing Nancy Sinatra's cover version of "Bang Bang (My Baby Shot Me Down)". The trailer then cuts to footage of live performances from the On the Run Tour, featuring Beyoncé and Jay-Z interacting. On September 21, the medley of "Young Forever" and "Halo" from the special was uploaded on Beyoncé's official YouTube channel into a seven-minute video. Michael Rothman from ABC News praised the clip as "amazing" and called its beginning "breathtaking". On October 6, 2014, the live video of the performance of "Flawless" was released on Beyoncé's Vevo account.

== Video trilogy ==
They [Beyoncé and Jay-Z] didn't really know what I was going to do, so I said, "I'm going to shoot for five minutes. Were going to process the footage, I'll bring it back for you to look at it and that's basically what the footage is going to look like." We picked a very particular, beautiful moment with Beyoncé in the mirrors, we processed the footage in a couple minutes and brought it back, and she thought it was beautiful. Jay Z came out and we shot for five minutes, with him and the cigar, and did the same thing. I was shooting with these old Russian lenses, there was no monitor, there wasn't anyone standing behind me and we started cranking along like that.

— Dikayl Rimmasch on shooting the "Bang Bang" short film trilogy

In September 2014, it was announced that a trilogy of videos entitled "Bang Bang" were to be released as a short film leading up to the broadcast of the tour special. The short film (in which multiple scenes are found in video interludes and backdrops throughout the tour) was directed by New York-based filmmaker and photographer Dikayl Rimmasch. Together with war photographer William Kaner, Rimmasch put together the filmmaking approach and aesthetic of the series. Inspired by French New Wave cinema, the short film was created using custom camera rigs that Rimmasch had designed, 50-year-old Russian lenses and lighting effects by Archie Ciotti and Scott Spencer and followed an incredibly fast, shoot-from-the-hip recording style. Rimmasch stated that he wanted to capture the feeling of the film Breathless after Beyoncé had proposed the idea behind the concept of the films to be inspired by the movie. Together with Kaner, Rimmasch browsed through frames from the aforementioned film and others such as Bring Me the Head of Alfredo Garcia (1974) and True Romance (1993) in order to find suitable images for the trilogy. He also included personal footage of the duo, including scenes taken from Jay-Z's 40th birthday party. Speaking about the concept of the videos Rimmasch stated,

In my first conversation on the telephone with Jay Z he explained his concept of On the Run. He said: 'We're not trying to do this literally, it's not that we're Bonnie and Clyde. We're on the run from everything. On the run from becoming a cliché. On the run from doing the same thing again.' Everything he mentioned was a level of consciousness he has for staying alive as an entertainer and as a human being. He wanted to keep it more abstract because for him it was very abstract. How do you stay new, not just to your audience but also yourself?

In part one of the trilogy, which premiered on September 15, 2014 on Nowness' official website, Jay-Z is seen kissing Beyoncé's neck whilst she is filmed writhing around on bedsheets. The couple then drive to a diner, where a customer reading a newspaper with the outlaw couple on the front page is seen staring at the back of Beyoncé's head. Jay-Z proceeds to stub out his cigar on the customer's food, before the couple drive off into the desert, laughing. The video is set to the vignette "Il Vizio di Uccidere" by Ennio Morricone and is shot in black-and-white. It was noted to be inspired by the movie Bonnie and Clyde and similar to the tour trailer for On the Run. Vulture's Nate Jones further compared it to works by Quentin Tarantino and Sergio Leone. However, following the release of part one of the trilogy, most published videos were deleted from the internet as well as part two or three not surfacing for their scheduled releases. When asked about this during an interview with i-D Vice magazine, Rimmasch simply stated "no comment".

== Concert synopsis ==
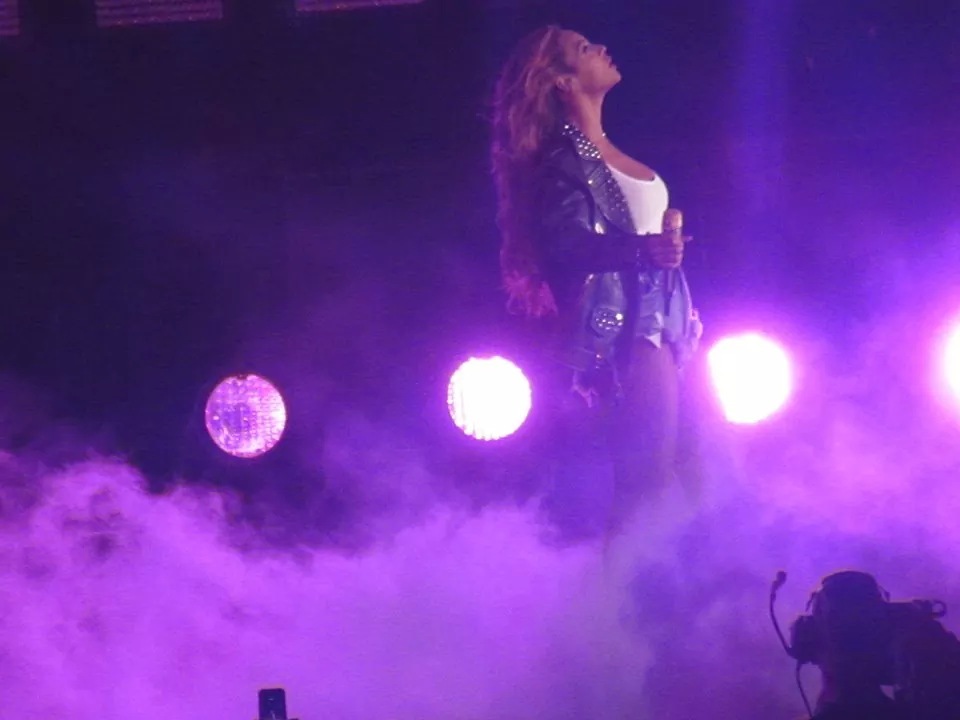
Beyoncé performing in denim shorts, a white T-shirt and a studded leather jacket. The stage production for the performance consisted of heavy smoke and coloured lighting.

The concert opened with a black-and-white video on the screen accompanied by sirens as Beyoncé and Jay Z appeared onstage surrounded by smoke. The duo started performing the song "'03 Bonnie & Clyde" with Beyoncé wearing a fishnet see-through mask and Jay Z wearing black sunglasses, a star-speckled shirt, black jacket and gold chains. The pair went on to perform "Upgrade U" as the second song during the set. The opening run from "'03 Bonnie & Clyde to "Upgrade U" set the tone."Crazy in Love" was performed by the duo among purple lights, smoke, and strobe lights with funky horns in the background. After the performance of the song, "Diamonds from Sierra Leone" began and Beyoncé left the stage as Jay Z continued singing. He performed "Niggas in Paris" alone on stage before being quickly joined by Beyoncé again for the performance of "Tom Ford". She returned to the stage with a military cap and sang the background vocals for the song. A performance of "Run the World (Girls)" followed with Chimamanda Ngozi Adichie's words from "Flawless" appearing on the screen and the latter song was sung by the singer while dancing with her background dancers. A short snippet of "Yoncé" was performed afterwards. An a cappella performance of "Big Pimpin'" followed accompanied by vintage videos and party scenes on the screen with Jay-Z wearing a fedora. Beyoncé performed "Naughty Girl" dressed in a bodysuit as she was immediately joined by Jay-Z for "Big Pimpin'".

Beyoncé appeared on stage seated in a glass chair, wearing a full-length sequined bodysuit and performed dancehall choreography to "Ring the Alarm" before continuing with "On to the Next One" along with Jay-Z. "Clique" followed with Beyoncé dressed in hooded leather as montage of war images and fireballs were shown on the screen. During the song, Beyonce shortly sang a remixed version of her "Diva" and went on singing "Baby Boy". She reappeared on stage dressed in a black drop-sleeve lace for the performance of "Haunted". "Drunk in Love" was performed with Beyoncé doing a chair dance and Jay-Z appeared during the end to rap his verse. "Public Service Announcement" and "Why Don't You Love Me" followed with the latter performance being accompanied by the French dancing duo Les Twins. For "Holy Grail", Justin Timberlake's vocals in the studio version were replaced with Beyoncé's. "Partition" featured a new rap verse sung by Jay-Z and Beyoncé performed it with a pole choreography along with other female dancers. A video with allusions from "Part II (On the Run)" showing Beyoncé covered in blood in a lineup and glass shattering preceded "99 Problems". "If I Were a Boy" followed with a cover of Lauryn Hill's "Ex-Factor" afterwards. Beyoncé moved to a stage in the middle of the stadium dressed as a bride in white with a floor-length bridal veil and continued with a performance of "Resentment" seated. She continued with "Love on Top" which was performed as a tribute to Michael Jackson.

"Hard Knock Life (Ghetto Anthem)" was performed by Jay-Z with black and white shots of Brooklyn. Beyoncé appeared on stage again to perform "Pretty Hurts" in a leather-studded jacket with the word "Texas" emblazoned across the back. The pair moved to the mini-stage for the performances of "Part II (On the Run)" and "Young Forever". Home videos of the couples' daughter Blue Ivy appeared on the screen and an image of "The Carters" written in the sand followed. One of the short projections on the screen showed footage of the pair's wedding ceremony in April 2008 along with their "IV" tattoos, as well as a pregnant Beyoncé showing her bare stomach, with Jay-Z behind, putting the surrogacy and fake pregnancy rumors that have appeared since 2011 to rest. "Lift Off" was performed as the last song on the set, serving as an outro. During the performance, Beyoncé changed her costumes numerous times.

== Set list ==
1. "'03 Bonnie & Clyde"
2. "Upgrade U"
3. "Crazy in Love" (contains elements of "Back That Azz Up" and "Show Me What You Got")
4. "Show Me What You Got"
5. "Diamonds From Sierra Leone"
6. "I Just Wanna Love U (Give It 2 Me)"
7. "Tom Ford"
8. "Run the World (Girls)"
9. "Flawless" / "Yonce" (with Nicki Minaj)
10. "Jigga My Nigga"
11. "Dirt off Your Shoulder"
12. "Naughty Girl" / "Big Pimpin'"
13. "Ring the Alarm"
14. "On to the Next One"
15. "Clique" (contains elements of "Diva")
16. "Baby Boy"
17. "U Don't Know"
18. "Haunted"
19. "No Church in the Wild"
20. "Drunk in Love"
21. "Public Service Announcement"
22. "Why Don't You Love Me"
23. "Holy Grail"
24. "FuckWithMeYouKnowIGotIt"
25. "Beach Is Better" / "Partition"
26. "99 Problems"
27. "If I Were a Boy" / "Ex-Factor"
28. "Song Cry"
29. "Resentment"
30. "Love on Top"
31. "Izzo (H.O.V.A.)"
32. "Niggas in Paris"
33. "Single Ladies (Put a Ring on It)"
34. "Hard Knock Life (Ghetto Anthem)"
35. "Pretty Hurts"
36. "Part II (On the Run)"

Encore

37. Young Forever"
38. "Halo"

== Reception ==
The concert special received a 0.5 rating of adults aged 18–49, and aired to 888,000 viewers. Adam Carlson of Time magazine described the special as unique, and felt that HBO's contributions were mostly simple and cheap "embellishment[s]" which showcase hypnotizing imagery. He summarised the tour special stating, "Beyoncé and Jay-Z style themselves as a modern-day Bonnie and Clyde... But why settle for bank robbers? The pair, African Americans who write, produce, and perform their own music, are never just one thing to anyone. It has been a horrible... summer — for them, for all of us — but On The Run, a symphony of spectacles, absorbs all of that into something small that feels huge: the most important marriage in pop culture." Erin Strecker of Billboard also gave the special a positive review, explaining that there were many high points from a musical perspective, before adding that the whole show was set up to look as one major high point with the pair changing turns to perform their songs as a medley showcasing their talents. He felt that it had something to offer to every viewer and added that the slow-motion footage focusing on Beyoncé and the audience was among the best executed of the special. Strecker chose the performance of "Young Forever" and "Halo" as the concert's highlight and finished his review concluding that "the HBO special allowed fans to see them up close and at their best". Similarly, a writer of Rap-Up called the special a three-hour "spectacular" with the duo being at their finest.

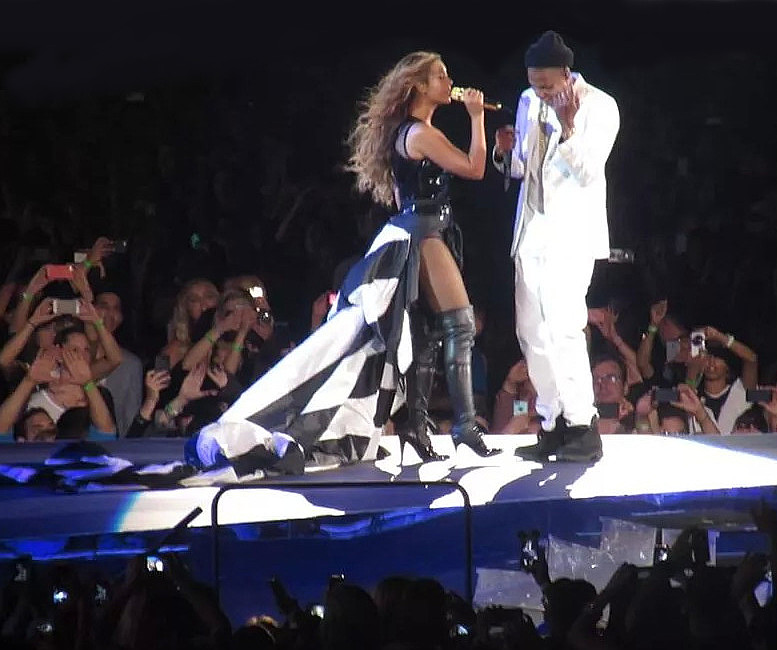
Beyoncé and Jay-Z performing "Halo" and "Young Forever" during a concert at the On the Run Tour. Many critics considered the performance to be a highlight of the special.

Slate editor Dee Lockett opined that as it was promised, the special contained many "show-stopping hits from both artists' catalogs, risqué film noir-style interludes, and lots of slow-mo"; she considered its best moment to be the medley of "Halo" and "Young Forever" due to its intimacy. Patrick Ryan of USA Today too gave a rave review of the special. Within his "5 reasons we love Bey, Jay more after HBO 'Run'" article in the magazine, he praised the duo's chemistry, their love showcased on stage and the emotions present during the performances of some of the songs. He felt that with the special, the pair put the media rumours about their divorce to rest and added that the ending which featured many personal moments, "got [the pair] teary-eyed closing out the show, [and] it was near impossible for us not to as well." Andrea Mandell of the same publication called the special the pair's "biggest triumph of all" and noted it was "full of smiles, affection, declarations of love". Although she felt that many of the routines on the concert had already been performed during Beyoncé's previous venture, The Mrs. Carter Show World Tour (2013–14), Christina Lee from the website Idolator concluded that viewers were to be "dazzled by how expertly produced" the special was. As examples of this she cited the inclusion of various videos on the screen as well as the performances of "Naughty Girl", "Flawless" and "Drunk in Love".

Vulture's Lindsey Weber felt that fans knew most of the details about the special due to the release of many clips prior to its premiere. She considered Minaj's appearance as one of the special's biggest changes and praised the scenes shot in slow motion as well as those showing the pair's daughter. In a positive review for Elle, Isabella Biedenharn called the special a "predictable Carter propaganda" with many "lovey scenes" occurring onstage between the pair and went on to praise Beyoncé's energetic performances. Jethro Nededog in an article for The Wrap opined that the "'us against the world' imagery" in the special denied rumours about the pair's divorce. He chose the performance of Lauryn Hill's "Ex-Factor" by Beyoncé as a show highlight. Chris Eggertsen from HitFix noted that most of the viewers watched the special because Beyoncé was featured in it. The A.V. Club's writer Joshua Alston deemed the special a tribute to the pair's romance and felt it was "handsomely shot... offering the next best thing to being there for anyone who couldn't get a line of credit approved in time to buy the exorbitant tickets", while further praising the concert itself. He went on to laud the pair's chemistry on the stage and during their joint performances. However, he finished his review in a more mixed note, writing "But for anyone who's more interested in the Carters the less pristine they appear to be, On The Run is like being served a 60-pound steak after you've already filled up on sizzle." The concert special was nominated in the category for Best Music Film at the 57th Annual Grammy Awards.
