= Shevel =

Shevel (Cyrillic: Шевель) is a surname. Notable people with the surname include:

- Andrey Shevel (born 1972), Russian rower
- Daniella Shevel, South African and American footwear designer
- Georgiy Shevel (1919–1988), Ukrainian politician and diplomat
- Yuriy Shevel (born 1988), Ukrainian footballer
