= On the Run Tour (Beyoncé and Jay-Z) =

2014 concert tour by Beyoncé and Jay-Z

- Tour by The Carters
- Location: United States; Canada; France
- Associated albums: Beyoncé; Magna Carta Holy Grail
- Start date: June 25, 2014
- End date: September 13, 2014
- No. of shows: 21
- Attendance: 979,781
- Box office: $109 million ($148.24 million in 2025 dollars)
Beyoncé tour chronology
The Mrs. Carter Show World Tour (2013–14)	On the Run Tour (2014)	The Formation World Tour (2016)
Jay-Z tour chronology
Magna Carter World Tour (2013–14)	On the Run Tour (2014)	4:44 Tour (2017)
The Carters tour chronology
On the Run Tour (2014)	On the Run II Tour (2018)

The On the Run Tour was a co-headlining all-stadium tour by American singer Beyoncé and rapper Jay-Z, also known as The Carters. The joint tour came shortly after Beyoncé and Jay-Z had finished their solo tours — The Mrs. Carter Show World Tour and Magna Carter World Tour (both 2013–14), and is in support of their 2013 studio albums — Beyoncé and Magna Carta Holy Grail. The tour’s name spins off from the duo’s 2013 song collaboration "Part II (On the Run)", included on Magna Carta Holy Grail. An official poster for the tour was released along with the announcement of the venture, showing Beyoncé and Jay-Z embracing whilst dressed in black ski masks, following the criminal "on the lam" narrative found in the couples' 2002 first single together, "'03 Bonnie & Clyde" and "Part II (On the Run)".

To promote the tour, a faux movie trailer video was premiered in May 2014 entitled "Run" (stylized as "RUN"). The video, which features eight celebrity cameo appearances, showcases the couple in a variety of Bonnie and Clyde style, action and gun packed situations. The tour itself was noted to follow this same theme throughout, with similar video interludes incorporated into the production of the show. Critics generally lauded the tour, praising the extravagant set list, dynamic and detailed theme and story of the show and both artists’ performance abilities, however some felt the on stage chemistry between the couple was not what it could have been.

Due to the large demand and tickets selling out in minutes in multiple locations, extra tour dates were added to the itinerary. The tour became a commercial success, grossing $96 million in the first 19 North American shows and $109.7 million in total as well as attendance totalling at 979,781. It was the fifth highest-grossing tour of 2014, according to Pollstar's annual year end tour chart. The show was broadcast in its entirety on September 20, 2014, airing on the American television network HBO, following the taping of the two concerts in Paris (France) where the tour concluded.

== Background ==
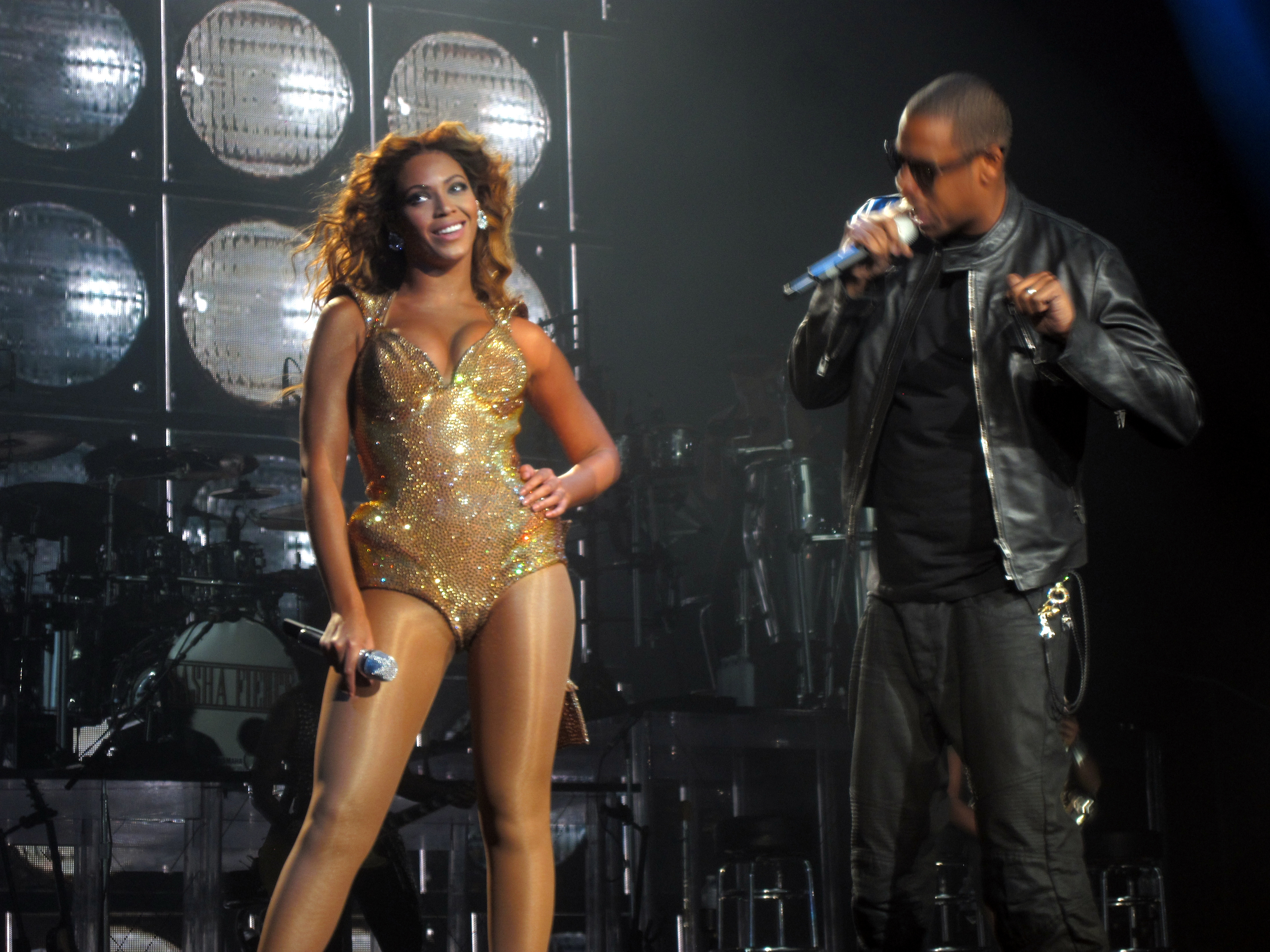
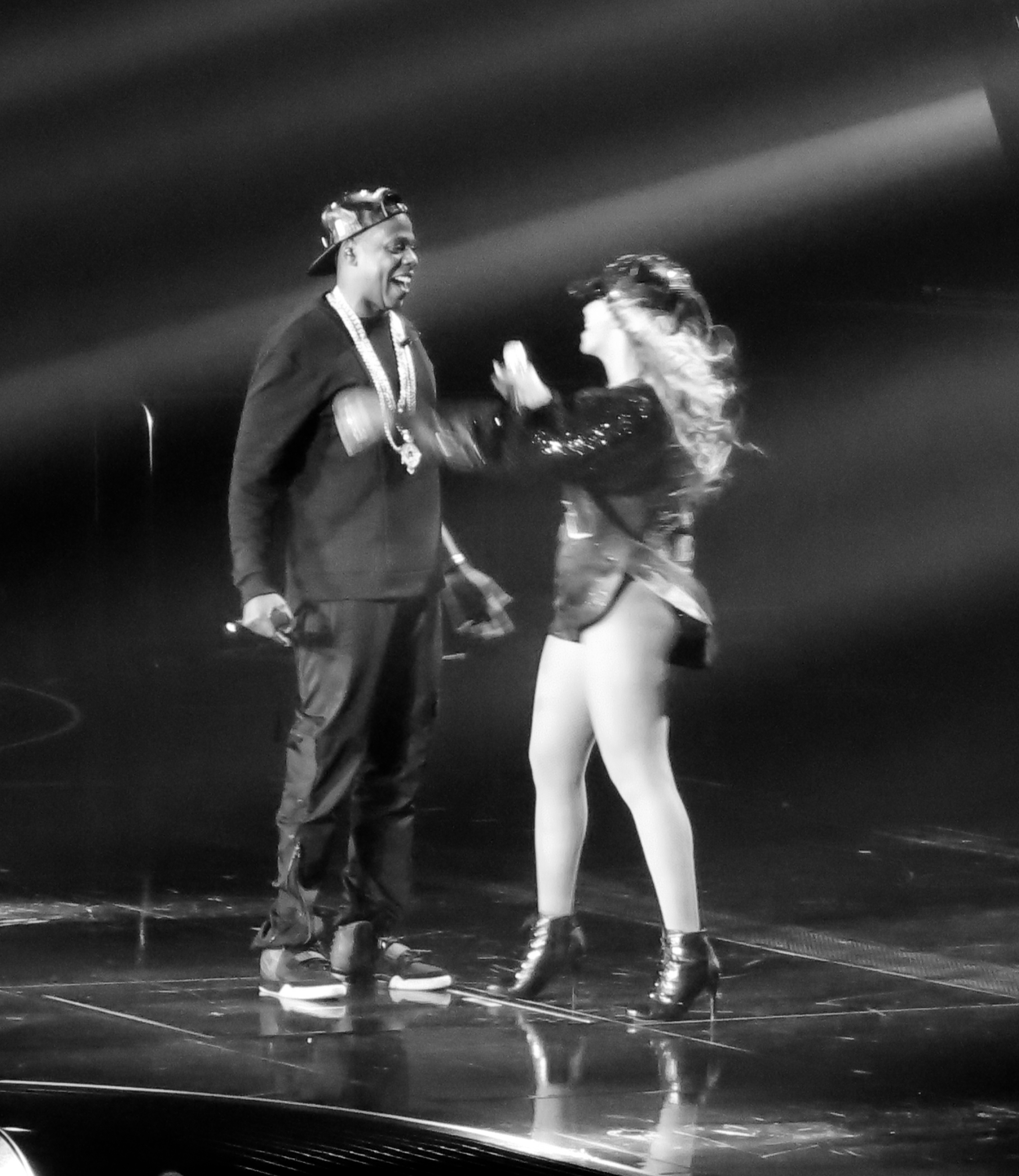
Beyoncé and Jay-Z have performed multiple times together throughout their careers, including on the I Am... World Tour (left) and The Mrs. Carter Show World Tour (right).

Beyoncé and Jay-Z first collaborated in 2002 on "'03 Bonnie & Clyde", a song from Jay-Z's seventh studio album, The Blueprint 2: The Gift & The Curse. Since then, other notable collaborations between the pair include Beyoncé's 2003 number-one song, "Crazy in Love" featuring Jay-Z, 2013's "Part II (On the Run)" which is widely regarded as the follow-up to "'03 Bonnie & Clyde" and "Drunk in Love", the couple's collaboration from Beyoncé's self-titled fifth album, which was unexpectedly released in December 2013.

In July 2013, Jay-Z stated that a joint tour with Beyoncé was "slowly making sense, more sense every day". Throughout 2013 and 2014, during Beyoncé's The Mrs. Carter Show World Tour, Jay-Z made multiple guest appearances, starting in July at The Sound of Change Live charity concert where the couple performed "Crazy in Love" together, shortly followed by another guest appearance at Brooklyn's Barclays Center in August, where Jay-Z performed "Tom Ford" accompanied by Beyoncé's backing vocals as found in the song. During Beyoncé's final leg of the tour in 2014, Jay-Z appeared a total of seven times to perform their most recent collaboration, "Drunk in Love", together. Jay-Z accompanied Beyoncé on all six nights of her O_{2} Arena stint in London and finally, at the last night of the tour in Lisbon.

The Pasadena City Council were holding a meeting to decide whether to approve Beyoncé and Jay-Z's proposed concert on August 2, 2014, at the Rose Bowl. The vote on the matter took place because the Rose Bowl – nestled within an affluent, residential neighbourhood – has a limited number of events permitted per year of twelve, which can only be extended if approved by the city council. The concert was ultimately reported to be the eighteenth approved event of 2014 for the Rose Bowl.

== Development ==
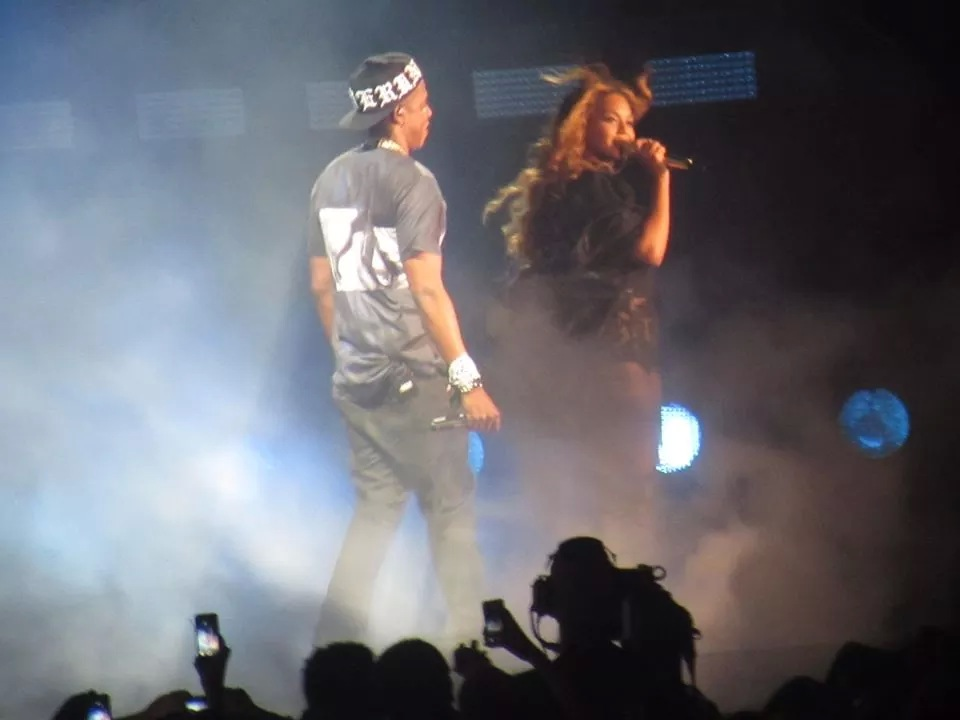
Beyoncé and Jay-Z performing "Drunk in Love" together

The tour was "conceived and launched fast compared to most stadium tours" according to Live Nation, who noted that most tours of this nature take more than a year of planning, compared to the On the Run Tour that took around one month. "It came together quite quickly, around mid-March", Omar Al-Joulani of Live Nation North America commented. "By April, we had everything together, and once the routing was in place we had about three weeks until the tour was announced." Following the general sale of tour dates, fans were left concerned as the July 11, 2014 show in East Rutherford, New Jersey remained pending to go on sale for many weeks, despite all other dates already being available to the public. Some reports stated that the reason for this was that the state of New Jersey had implemented a legislation resulting in 95% of tickets for an event having to be available to the public. The show was eventually put on sale to the public on June 4, 2014. The On the Run Tour was the first tour to be a part of "Official Events" – the collaboration of Facebook and Live Nation in which the size and scale of Ticketmaster's database is leveraged as events promoted by Live Nation are imported to Artists' Facebook Pages as "Official Events", providing fans with direct links to Ticketmaster to purchase verified tickets.

The tour was stated to have a running theme throughout the performances of being "on the run" by the Miami New Times, whether it is from "the media, their place in pop music, the haters, the bullshit and sometimes even each other". When explaining the concept of the tour and its accompanying videos in a telephone conversation to New York-based director Dikayal Rimmasch, Jay-Z stated "We're not trying to do this literally, it's not that we're Bonnie and Clyde. We're on the run from everything. On the run from becoming a cliché. On the run from doing the same thing again." During their individual performances, Beyoncé was often backed by both male and female dancers and Jay-Z was noted to hold the stage for multiple songs without assistance. Beyoncé was backed by an all female band during her solo songs, whilst Jay-Z was accompanied by other male instrumentalists; however both artist's musicians collaborated for the majority of the performance. Video interludes filled with "cop chases and other violent outbursts" carried the storytelling between songs. The performances of the joint tour was said to be split up similarly to Jay-Z's previous joint venture with Kanye West, the Watch the Throne Tour. Beyoncé and Jay-Z would take turn holding down the stage, beginning with several songs by Beyoncé first, followed by duets and afterwards Jay-Z rapping his songs. Both artists sported multiple outfits from a variety of fashion designers throughout the performances of the tour. In Beyoncé's case, makeup artist Sir John Barnette commented on her quick changes backstage between performances, comparing them to "Daytona 500" with every member of her team working on a separate part of her look.

== Fashion ==
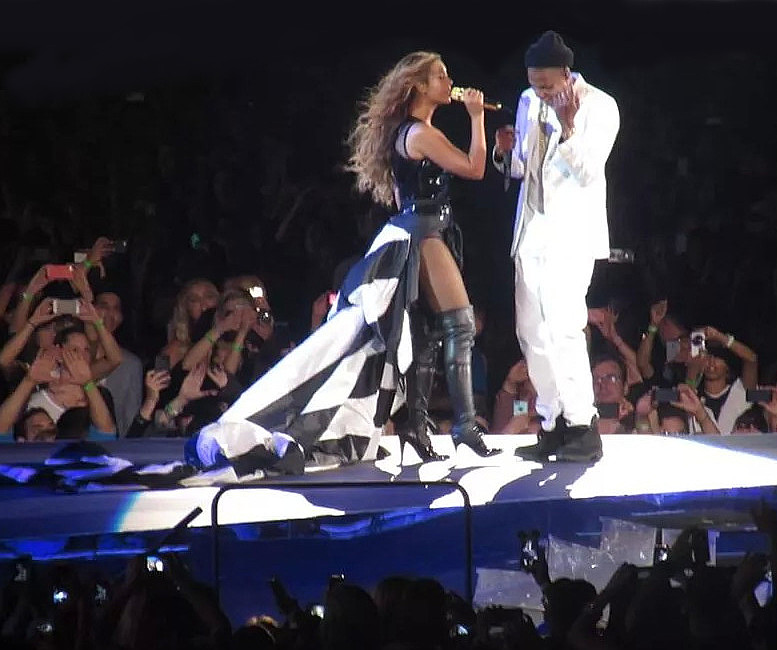
During the tour, both headliners sported multiple outfits. Beyoncé is seen wearing a black and white American flag dress, with a 16.4 feet long train.

Both Beyoncé and Jay-Z sported multiple outfits throughout the different performances of the tour. One of the more prominent designers for the tour was Versace, in which Beyoncé wore both a fishnet and leather Atelier black bodysuit (complete with a plunging neckline, a fishnet head mask and high heel combat boots), as well as a colourful Atelier bodysuit from the designer. The leather Atelier black bodysuit took approximately 200 hours to craft and was used for the opening number of the tour, "'03 Bonnie & Clyde". The colourful bodysuit was commented on by Versace who stated that the team had their inspiration from the street for the colour and added various crystals and stripes to show a "baseball vibe" while also trying to capture Beyoncé's energy. Beyoncé's tour shoes were designed by Stuart Weitzman and Joker's Closet. Other outfits included a denim jumpsuit and a bedazzled leotard bodysuit that "showed off her derrière". Beyoncé also sported more thematic and dramatic pieces of clothing, including a full bridal veil and a sweeping train made of a black-and-white American flag. The American flag outfit was designed by Riccardo Tisci of Givenchy and took over 500 hours to create. The American flag train was 16.4 feet long but weighed around 500 grams allowing it to fly in the wind. The individual stars on the outfit were hand-embroidered and its inspiration was said to be "American Danger: Bonnie & Clyde with a modern twist." For the performance of "Ring the Alarm", Beyoncé returned to designer Vrettos Vrettakos (with whom she collaborated notably on her previous solo tour). Designed by Dennis Kolpodinos, Vrettakos produced a red, "couture 'crystal spirit' bodysuit" complete with fringe details on the limbs and "embellished with Swarovski crystals for stage-ready shine".

Alexander Wang designed a "bondage body suit" worn by Beyoncé during the show, as well as multiple pieces by Nicola Formichetti for Diesel. One of these included the previously mentioned denim outfit, which was "made from the company's patented Jogg Jean material, accented with hand-applied hardware and studwork, Swarovski crystal elements and black leather accessories", worn for the performance of "Run the World (Girls)". Formichetti commented on the outfit, saying "Every classic cops and robbers story blurs the lines between the good and bad, we wanted Beyoncé's to be both. Her look is one part police officer and two parts jailbait." Another piece designed by Diesel was an outfit consisting of jean-shorts and a leather jacket embroiled with the word "Texas". Biker gangs that developed in the United States after World War II served as an inspiration for the outfit; Beyoncé's was meant as a tribute to her hometown and a reminder of her roots. It took 4–5 hours to add the word Texas to the leather jacket. The bondage bodysuit was described as "a riff off of an urban bomber hoodie jacket that was cropped to expose a bondage bodysuit underneath that has graphic cutouts. When worn up, the oversized hood covers the face, adding an incognito element reminiscent of the On The Run theme." It also contained snakeskin seamed into the sleeves of the outfit. One of the more controversial pieces worn by Beyoncé during the On the Run Tour was a black, thong leotard that "put her bare rear end on display in a kind of cage-like cutout". Erica Schwiegershausen of The Cut blog wrote that the number was a "somewhat disorienting look". During the performance of "Single Ladies (Put a Ring on It)", Beyoncé revisited a leotard from the song's music video in a black and gold lace bodysuit designed by Michael Costello who wanted "Beyoncé to feel beautiful, strong, super sexy and ventilated" with the outfit. Lebanese designer Elie Saab created a bridal-themed, white long-sleeve lace-embellished jumpsuit for Beyoncé for the performances of "Resentment" and "Love On Top" which was part of his Pre-Fall 2014 collection.

Jay-Z's fashion was noted to be Kanye-esque, with pieces worn by him including rotating ensembles of black leather as well as "giant, billowing pant scarves". For the opening performance, Jay-Z appeared on stage in black sunglasses, gold chains, a black and white star speckled shirt and a black jacket. During the performance of "Big Pimpin'" Jay-Z wore a fedora.

== Promotion ==
The tour was officially announced on April 28, 2014, via Jay-Z's Facebook page. Announcements shortly followed through Beyoncé's website and an official press release. Pre-sale tickets for fans to secure their seats first before the general sale were sold through Beyoncé's website and Chase credit and debit card users exclusively. A writer for Billboard noted that Chase was a surprising candidate for the official tour sponsor due to their lack of experience in the concert industry when compared to the live music sponsorship giants such as Citi and American Express. Chase allegedly scored the "11th-hour" deal due to previous connections with Roc Nation Sports (owned by Jay-Z) and a $4 million bid on the position. A promotional poster for the tour was revealed showing Jay-Z and Beyoncé embracing and wearing ski masks, following the criminals-on-the-lam narrative of the couple's two singles ("'03 Bonnie & Clyde" and "Part II (On the Run)"). Beyoncé also wore a similar ski mask in her 2013 video "Superpower" featuring Frank Ocean from her self-titled album. A second promotional poster was released on May 30, 2014, in an email to fans announcing the on sale times for certain tour dates. The poster features Beyoncé dressed in a white, short-cut wedding dress whilst sitting behind and hugging Jay-Z on a motorcycle.

Following the tour's announcement, it was revealed that $1 from each ticket sold and a portion of certain VIP ticket proceeds would go to the Shawn Carter Foundation (named based on Jay-Z's birth name), which would help and support existing students of the foundation that represent diverse backgrounds, and face significant barriers to success such as teen pregnancy, homelessness, poverty, former incarceration, sexual and domestic abuse, and gang membership. Fans in Houston, Texas were requested to bring preservable goods to a selected location by Beyoncé as part of her "#BeyGood" campaign, in association with the Houston Food Bank, Miss-A-Meal, The Bread of Life and Majic 102.1, to help work towards eradicating the nearly 870,000 Houston families suffering from hunger. Fans who donated to the campaign resulted in a chance of winning some of the best tickets in the house for the On the Run Tour in Houston, at Minute Maid Park. The campaign "exceeded expectations", with 2,500 people donating over 10 tonnes of food.

On May 17, 2014, an official video in a faux movie trailer style starring Beyoncé and Jay-Z was released entitled "Run", featuring "Part II (On the Run)" serving as background music. The video, which features multiple celebrity cameos including Don Cheadle, Guillermo Díaz, Jake Gyllenhaal, Kidada Jones, Rashida Jones, Blake Lively, Emmy Rossum and Sean Penn, shows Beyoncé and Jay-Z out on a Bonnie and Clyde expedition, filled with action, crime, love and guns. Multiple other snippets of tracks from Magna Carta Holy Grail carry the video, alongside "Part II (On the Run)". The video notably ended stating "coming never", indicating that the trailer was in fact never going to be a full feature film. The video was directed by Melina Matsoukas. One of the many outfits worn by Beyoncé in the video was a Givenchy lace pant suit, and was commented to add an angelic feel to the contrasting, violent run of the narrative.

== Concert synopsis ==
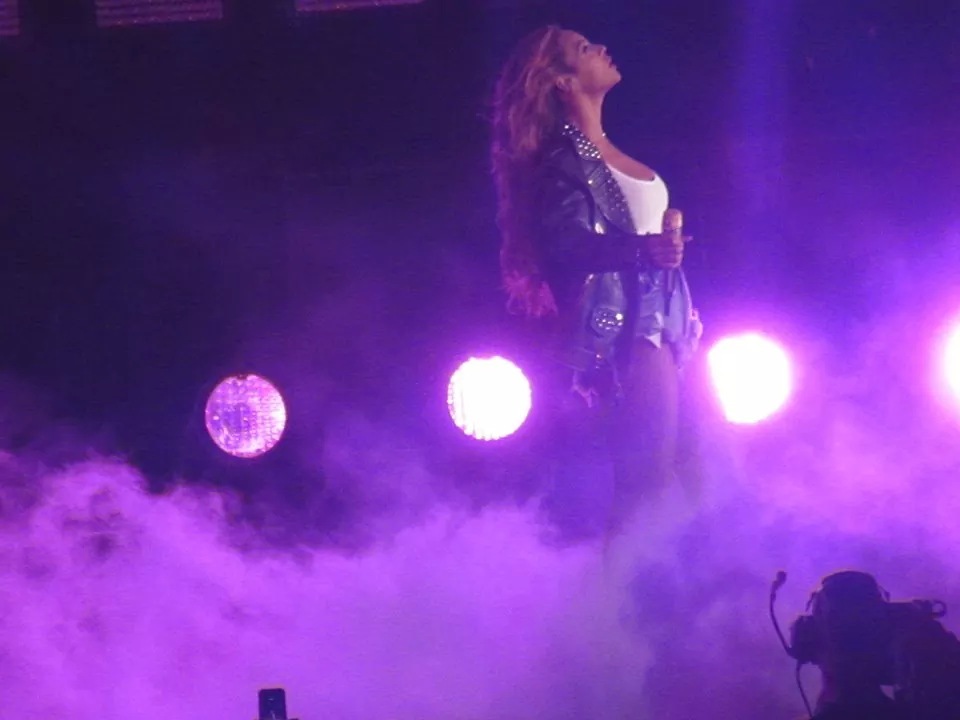
Beyoncé performing in denim shorts, a white T-shirt and a studded leather jacket. The stage production for the performance consisted of heavy smoke and coloured lighting.

The concert opened with a black-and-white video on the screen accompanied by sirens as Beyoncé and Jay-Z appeared onstage surrounded by smoke. The duo started performing the song "'03 Bonnie & Clyde" with Beyoncé wearing a fishnet see-through mask and Jay-Z wearing a star-speckled shirt and gold chains. The pair went on to perform "Upgrade U" as the second song during the set. "Crazy in Love" was performed by the duo among purple lights, smoke, and strobe lights with funky horns in the background."Diamonds from Sierra Leone" followed with Beyoncé leaving the stage as Jay-Z continued sang it and "Niggas in Paris" sol. Next, he performed "Tom Ford" with Beyoncé returning to the stage in a military cap and singing backup. Jay-Z leaves the stage and Beyoncé sang "Run the World (Girls)" followed by a medley of "Flawless" and "Yoncé" was performed.

The next segment opened with Beyoncé and Jay-Z singing a medley of "Naughty Girl" and "Big Pimpin'". Beyoncé then went to a glass chair, wearing a full-length sequined bodysuit, to performing "Ring the Alarm", followed by a duet of "On to the Next One" with Jay-Z. A mashup of "Clique" and "Diva" was sung by Beyoncé as a montage of war images and fireballs were shown on the screen, then the performance of "Baby Boy" followed. After a costume change, Beyoncé sang "Haunted" and "Drunk in Love", the latter with Jay-Z. "Public Service Announcement" and "Why Don't You Love Me" followed with the latter performance being accompanied by the French dancing duo Les Twins. The duo then sang "Holy Grail" and "Partition", the latter with a pole choreography by Beyoncé and her female dancers.

The third segment started with a video intermission with excerpts from "Part II (On the Run)" showing Beyoncé covered in blood in a lineup and glass shattering. Jay-z performed "99 Problems solo, followed by Beyoncé singing a medley "If I Were a Boy" and "Ex-Factor" afterwards. Beyoncé moved to a stage in the middle of the stadium dressed as a bride with a long veil, and continued with a performance of "Resentment" seated. She closed the act with "Love On Top", which was performed as a tribute to Michael Jackson, and "Single Ladies (Put a Ring on It)".

The final segment saw Jay-Z singing "Hard Knock Life (Ghetto Anthem)" with black and white shots of Brooklyn. Beyoncé appeared on stage again to perform "Pretty Hurts" in a leather-studded jacket with the word "Texas" emblazoned across the back. The pair moved to the mini-stage for the performance of "Part II (On the Run)", before exiting for a final costume change.

The encore began with home videos of the couples' daughter Blue Ivy appeared on the screen and an image of "The Carters" written in the sand followed. One of the short projections on the screen showed footage of the pair's wedding ceremony in April 2008 along with their "IV" tattoos, as well as a pregnant Beyoncé showing her bare stomach, with Jay-Z behind, putting the surrogacy and fake pregnancy rumors that have appeared since 2011 to rest. The couple then appeared to close the show with a medley of "Young Forever" and "Halo". Beyoncé and Jay-Z thanked the audience for coming and left as "Lift Off" played as the outro.

== Critical reception ==
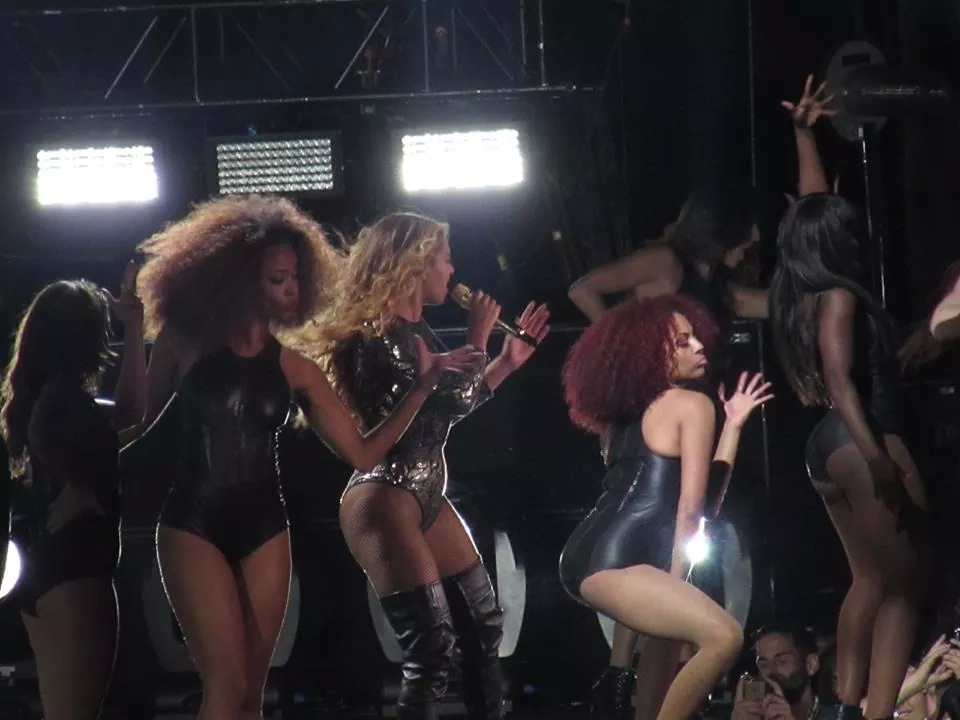
The tour was generally well received by critics. Beyoncé was praised for her performance abilities and choreographed routines with her background dancers, and can be seen performing "Single Ladies (Put a Ring on It)".

The opening night of the tour received generally positive reviews: USA Today's Erica K. Landau praised the Miami concert, summarizing it as "[a] tantalizing spectacle, [with] triumphant vocals, palpable sensuality and booty-shaking anthems". She further described the performance as integrated adding that, "the coordination is not just remarkable, it's the absolute best way that two of the world's best performers can deliver a show that proves why they're on top together". MTV News editor Rebecca Thomas praised the duo's united performance, adding that they demonstrated how to share a stage, "egos aside: They toggled, repeatedly, and mostly seamlessly from one megastar catalog to the other and took fan-favorites in surprising new directions — ones that imbued them with pathos that hadn't been there before." Miami New Times Kat Bein felt that the chemistry between the couple was not what it could have been, with Beyoncé reportedly shaking off Jay-Z's kisses or turning away during his "doting playfulness", however Bein added that this could have been merely a playful act for the stage. She felt that potential "witty banter" between the couple was lost with the use of the video pieces between the songs. Jon Caramanica in a review for The New York Times opined that each entertainer gave the other the opportunity to be the center of attention, while acknowledging their different types of success. He concluded "Jay-Z allowed for breezy enjoyment; Beyoncé demanded full and reverent attention".

The following concerts for the duration of the tour were also met with high praise from critics: Merecedes J. Howze of New Pittsburgh Courier praised the "consistent" show in Cincinnati, stating "The duo has proven numerous times that their union, professionally and personally, is unstoppable." Howze concluded that the show was definitely a "couples concert" meant to be "enjoy[ed]" with a love partner. CityBeat's Jac Kern, who attended the same show praised the duo for performing hard while fully using both of the two stages and interacting with the crowd. However she also felt that intimate moments between the couple on stage were "possibly staged". The production of the tour was stated to be both large and minimal by The Boston Globe writer James Read who commented that only a few performers could manage to pull off a production of On The Run's scale. He continued his review, "Nor is there much to behold beyond its stars: no long catwalks, elaborate sets, or even a visible band. With Beyoncé and Jay-Z, two natural-born entertainers, you do not need much more."

Mesfin Fekadu of the Associated Press reported that the set list of the show emulated a conversation told through songs; he noted that despite the concert being a collaborative tour, "it was the performers' emotional solo material that made their presence as a collaborative duo strong and resilient". The first Canadian show of the tour was again well received by critics. Graham Slaughter of the Toronto Star concluded in his review, "If there's anything to be learned from the On the Run tour, it's that tight timing, a dynamic storyline and legendary talent make a 42-song concert not just enjoyable, but rather unforgettable. Performers be warned: the bar on dual concerts has forever been raised." Lorraine Ali of the Los Angeles Times who attended the first of two shows in Pasadena, California, also gave a positive review noting that the concert showcased how a marriage should work with the spouses "balancing out each other's weaknesses with individual strengths" on stage. Ali went on praising the stage interactions between the pair such as kissing and toggling and concluded, "Whether it was a carefully orchestrated act or not, they are a great team."

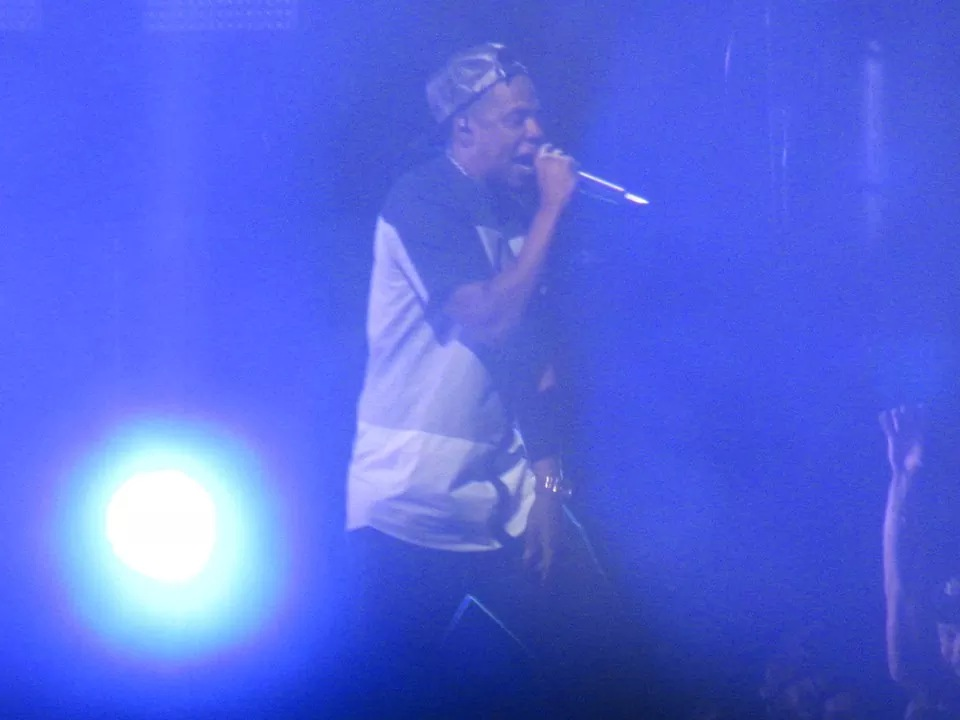
Jay-Z was commended for holding down the stage and working the crowd alone for most of his solo performances.

The only European shows in Saint-Denis, France, were also lauded by critics. Lewis Corner of Digital Spy gave the second show a five star review. He praised the performance abilities of both artists, explaining "When left to [Jay-Z's] own devices on stage, the rapper is forceful and beguiling. It takes little for him to have thousands waving their hands to 'Tom Ford', as he looks dapper in honour of the designer. But when Beyoncé rises up out of the stage in a denim military outfit to the question 'bad bitch?' and then storms into 'Run The World (Girls)', the track's sentiment couldn't resound more. Without doubt, she lives up to her hype as one of the world's best performers. Slick movement, tight choreography, innocent attitude and effortless vocals instantly escalate the atmosphere of the show." Simon Harper of Clash felt that both performers had immediately apparent different performance approaches and both commanded an "incredible presence and deafening screams from the French crowd", however concluded that Beyoncé just finished on top as the better of the two, finalising his all positive review with "The music world's most powerful and influential partnership couldn't fail to demonstrate the reasons for their rise to dominance... As the On The Run tour comes to its conclusion, it's clear to see that Mrs. Carter emerges on top. But damn, it was a good race to watch."

== Commercial performance ==
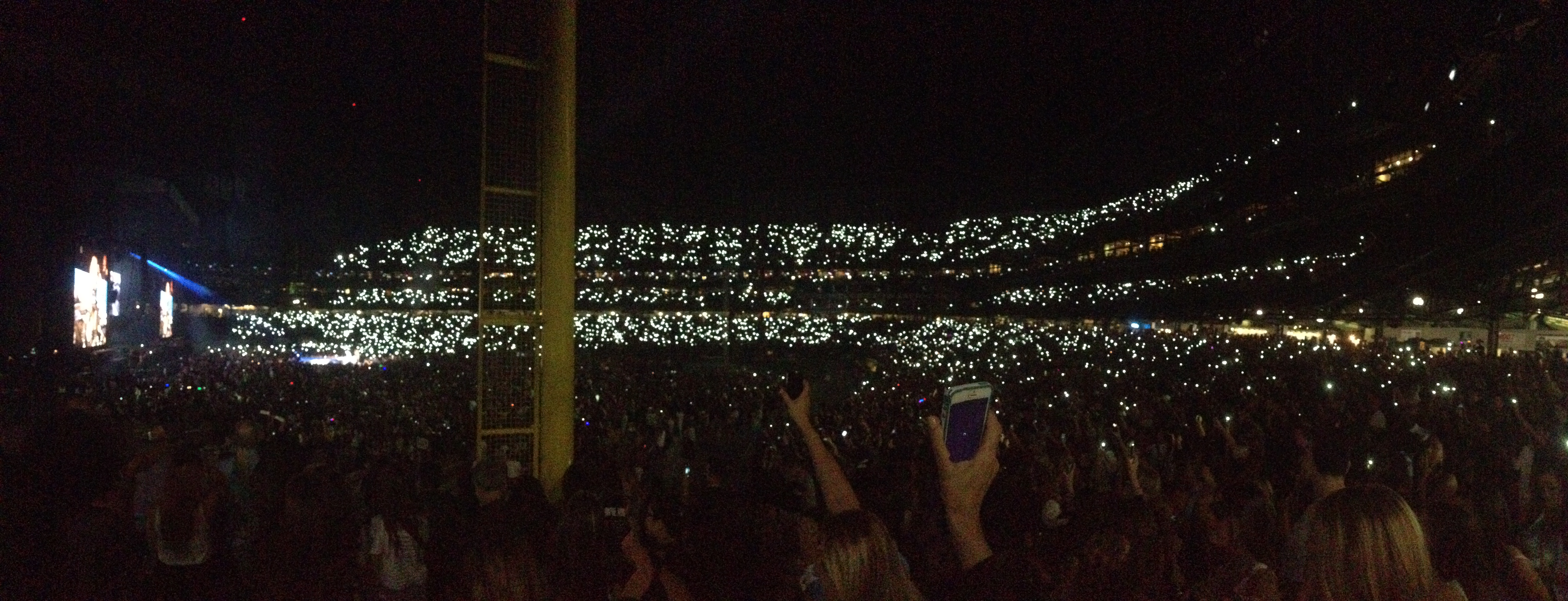
The tour was a commercial success, playing for over 980,000 fans. A lit up and crowded Safeco Field is seen from the couples concert there on July 30, 2014.

Tickets for the tour were priced at $40 to $275, so that wherever fans were on the "ticket chain", they had an opportunity to attend the show. "We made sure we had affordable tickets as well as the higher-priced tickets that we know the market can bear. Pricing went right across the spectrum", promoters explained. Jesse Lawrence of Forbes stated that demand for the tour was "through the roof" and that the On the Run Tour was "guaranteed to be one of the biggest tours in recent years." Shortly after pre-sales for the tour began, tickets had already started to appear on the secondary ticketing market. In the same article, Lawrence explained how with an average ticket price of $342.67 on the secondary market, the On the Run Tour was "head and shoulders above the rest", having a higher average ticket price than both Beyoncé and Jay-Z's previous aforementioned solo tours, Jay-Z's previous co-headlining tours with Justin Timberlake and Eminem, as well as The Monster Tour; the then upcoming co-headlining tour from Rihanna and Eminem.

Billboard reported that the On the Run Tour was "already one of the summer concert season's hottest engagements" and noted that tickets had sold out in minutes for multiple dates. Due to the large demand, extra dates were added in East Rutherford, San Francisco and Pasadena following the first shows in each city selling out. The second Rose Bowl stadium date in Pasadena, California, again had to await approval from the Pasadena City Council for the aforementioned reason that the Rose Bowl has a cap of twelve events per year and all other events exceeding this limit require approval from the city council. On June 13, 2014, two Saint-Denis dates of the tour were announced, set to be performed at the Stade de France. The dates were labelled as the exclusive, only European shows of the On the Run Tour. Within two hours of going on general sale, 90,000 tickets were sold between the two Saint-Denis shows.

Live Nation reported to Billboard that the tour had already sold 750,000 tickets and was on pace to reach 850,000 total tickets sold in North America. It was also noted that the tour was averaging close to $5.2 million per show in current sales and that the On the Run Tour would finish as "one of the most successful tours of the year". On the same day, Forbes reported that the summer tour would most likely finish as the second most successful tour of all time by one measure when looking at the average gross per show, which then stood at a predicted $5 million. In August 2014, Omar Al-Joulani of North American touring for Live Nation confirmed that the On the Run Tour had officially passed $100 million in ticket sales in the 19 North American shows alone, with attendance topping out at more than the previously predicted 850,000. Al-Joulani also noted the triumph of the tour outside of the "must play" markets such as New York City or Los Angeles, stating the tour routed into some secondary touring markets like Cincinnati, New Orleans and Seattle "that turned out to be wildly successful". "We had the greatest time in those markets" said Al-Joulani.

In September 2014, the North American leg of the tour was individually reported to Billboard Boxscore. Beyoncé and Jay-Z landed atop of the Hot Tours chart with 19 sold out shows. The most commercially successful performances of the tour were venues with double bookings, found in East Rutherford, grossing $11.5 million, Pasadena grossing $10.9 million and San Francisco, generating $8.8 million. The tour was announced as the 5th highest-grossing tour of 2014 in Pollstar's annual highest-grossing tours chart, with a total revenue of $109.7 million. The tour also had a total attendance of 979,781 and an average attendance of 57,634 per city.

=== Records ===
At the July 1, 2014 concert in Foxborough, Jay-Z became the first rapper to headline Gillette Stadium. Baltimore Ravens senior manager for ticket sales Mike Burke reported that the On the Run Tour was the fastest selling concert ever at the M&T Bank Stadium, stating that unlike other shows there, "this sold out every seat almost instantly. I guess that's the power of Beyoncé."

== Broadcasts and recordings ==
In July 2014, it was announced that HBO would exclusively air the On the Run Tour in full at some point in September, following the upcoming filming of the concerts in Saint-Denis, France at the scheduled September 12 and 13, 2014 shows in the city. The shows were shot by music video director Jonas Åkerlund and aired on the channel on September 20, 2014. The concert special received a 0.5 rating of adults aged 18–49, and aired to 888,000 viewers. Following the airing of the special, videos of the performances of "Young Forever" / "Halo" and "Flawless (remix)" featuring Nicki Minaj, were uploaded to Beyoncé's official YouTube and Vevo account.

In September 2014, it was announced that a trilogy of videos entitled "Bang Bang" were to be released as a short film leading up to the broadcast of the tour special. The short film (in which multiple scenes are found in video interludes and backdrops throughout the tour) was directed by New York-based filmmaker and photographer Dikayl Rimmasch. Together with war photographer William Kaner, Rimmasch put together the filmmaking approach and aesthetic of the series. Inspired by French New Wave cinema, the short film was created using custom camera rigs that Rimmasch had designed, 50-year-old Russian lenses and lighting effects by Archie Ciotti and Scott Spencer and followed an incredibly fast, shoot-from-the-hip recording style. However, following the release of part one of the trilogy, the remaining two videos never came to surface on their scheduled release dates. When asked about this (and the deletion of part one from its original upload source), Rimmasch simply stated "no comment". In February 2015, all 3 videos resurfaced online, debuting on creativeexchangeagency.com.

== Set list ==
This set list is representative of the first performance in East Rutherford, New Jersey. It does not represent all concerts for the duration of the tour.

1. "'03 Bonnie & Clyde"
2. "Upgrade U"
3. "Crazy in Love"
4. "Show Me What You Got"
5. "Diamonds Is Forever"
6. "Niggas in Paris"
7. "Tom Ford"
8. "Run the World (Girls)"
9. "Flawless"
10. "Yoncé"
11. "Dirt off Your Shoulder"
12. "Naughty Girl"
13. "Big Pimpin'"
14. "Ring the Alarm"
15. "On to the Next One"
16. "Clique"
17. "Diva"
18. "Baby Boy"
19. "U Don't Know"
20. "Ghost" / "Haunted"
21. "No Church in the Wild"
22. "Drunk in Love"
23. "Public Service Announcement"
24. "Why Don't You Love Me"
25. "Holy Grail"
26. "FuckWithMeYouKnowIGotIt"
27. "Beach Is Better"
28. "Partition"
29. "99 Problems"
30. "If I Were a Boy"
31. "Ex-Factor"
32. "Song Cry"
33. "Resentment"
34. "Love On Top"
35. "Izzo (H.O.V.A.)"
36. "I Just Wanna Love U (Give It 2 Me)"
37. "Single Ladies (Put a Ring on It)"
38. "Hard Knock Life (Ghetto Anthem)"
39. "Pretty Hurts"
40. "Part II (On the Run)"
41. "Young Forever"
42. "Halo"
43. "Lift Off"

== Shows ==
List of concerts, showing date, city, country, venue, attendance and gross revenue
Date	City	Country	Venue	Attendance (Tickets sold / available)	Revenue
June 25, 2014	Miami Gardens	United States	Sun Life Stadium	49,980 / 49,980	$5,450,026
June 28, 2014	Cincinnati	United States	Great American Ball Park	37,863 / 37,863	$4,250,931
July 1, 2014	Foxborough	United States	Gillette Stadium	52,802 / 52,802	$5,738,114
July 5, 2014	Philadelphia	United States	Citizens Bank Park	40,634 / 40,634	$5,141,381
July 7, 2014	Baltimore	United States	M&T Bank Stadium	51,212 / 51,212	$5,016,036
July 9, 2014	Toronto	Canada	Rogers Centre	48,029 / 48,029	$4,943,390
July 11, 2014	East Rutherford	United States	MetLife Stadium	89,165 / 89,165	$11,544,187
July 12, 2014	East Rutherford	United States	MetLife Stadium	89,165 / 89,165	$11,544,187
July 15, 2014	Atlanta	United States	Georgia Dome	48,938 / 48,938	$5,210,602
July 18, 2014	Houston	United States	Minute Maid Park	40,103 / 40,103	$5,235,438
July 20, 2014	New Orleans	United States	Mercedes-Benz Superdome	42,374 / 42,374	$5,206,490
July 22, 2014	Arlington	United States	AT&T Stadium	41,463 / 41,463	$5,050,479
July 24, 2014	Chicago	United States	Soldier Field	50,035 / 50,035	$5,783,396
July 27, 2014	Winnipeg	Canada	Investors Group Field	29,542 / 29,542	$3,187,580
July 30, 2014	Seattle	United States	Safeco Field	40,615 / 40,615	$4,339,642
August 2, 2014	Pasadena	United States	Rose Bowl	96,994 / 96,994	$10,993,245
August 3, 2014	Pasadena	United States	Rose Bowl	96,994 / 96,994	$10,993,245
August 5, 2014	San Francisco	United States	AT&T Park	73,020 / 73,020	$8,887,539
August 6, 2014	San Francisco	United States	AT&T Park	73,020 / 73,020	$8,887,539
September 12, 2014	Saint-Denis	France	Stade de France	147,012 / 147,012	$13,631,722
September 13, 2014	Saint-Denis	France	Stade de France	147,012 / 147,012	$13,631,722
Total				979,781 / 979,781 (100%)	$109,610,198

== Personnel ==
Credits and personnel are taken from the Official On the Run Tour Program.

Creative stage direction/staging

- Beyoncé
- Jay-Z

Performance environment designed and illuminated by

- Beyoncé
- Jay-Z
- LeRoy Bennett

Creative directors

- Todd Tourso
- Ed Burke

Music directors

- Derek Dixie
- Omar Edwards

Band

- Omar Edwards – Keyboards
- Tony Royster Jr. – Drums
- Rie Tsuji – Keyboards/assistant arranger
- BiBi McGill – Guitar
- Kat Rodriguez – Tenor/bari saxophone
- Crystal "Rovél" Torres – Trumpet
- Addison Evans – Alto saxophone
- Lauren "LT" Taneil – Bass
- Venzella Joy – Drums

Background vocalists – The Mamas

- Crissy Collins (tenor)
- Montina Cooper (alto)
- Tiffany Monique Riddick (soprano)

Dancers

- Ashley Everett – Dance captain
- Kimberly Gipson – Dance captain
- Les Twins
- Denee "Dnay B." Baptiste
- Sarah Burns
- Tanesha "Ksyn" Cason
- Hannah Douglass
- Hajiba Fahmy
- Amandy Fernandez
- Kim Gingras

Choreography

- Chris Grant
- Dana Foglia
- Swetlana Kostantinova
- Philipe Decouflé

Additional choreography

- Frank Gatson
- JaQuel Knight
- Denee Baptiste
- The Crazy Horse dancers
- Sheryl Murakami
- Christian Owens
- Jeffrey Page
- Mishay Petronelli
- Danielle Polanco
- Les Twins
- Jose "Hollywood" Ramos
- Tanisha Scott
- LaVelle Smith Jr.

Beyoncé wardrobe

- Ty Hunter – Head stylist
- Raquel Smith – Stylist

Jay-Z wardrobe

- June Ambrose – Head stylist
- Tuki Babumba – Assistant to June Ambrose
- Eli Wasserman – Assistant to June Ambrose
- Rebecca Pietri – Wardrobe/ambiance co-ordinator

Band/dancer wardrobe

- Su Flesland-Carter
- Hannah Kinkead
- Tim White
- Marni Senofonte – Additional styling
- Eric Archibald – Additional styling

Tour hospitality

- Christine Dallas – Backstage co-ordinator
- Kavi Agrawal – Backstage co-ordinator
- Christopher Genovese – Dressing room/ambiance co-ordinator
- Alli Harvey – Dressing room assistant
- Eddie Uvaydov – Assistant backstage co-ordinator

Personal services

- Natalie Kinghorn – Physiotherapist
- Neal Farinah – Hair stylist
- Sir John Barnette – Make-up artist
- Brandon Crowe – Personal chef

Tour management

- Desiree Perez – Executive Producer
- Alan Floyd – Tour manager
- Marlon Bowers – Assistant tour manager
- Larry Beyince – Assistant tour manager

Tour promotion

- Live Nation

Tour business administration

- Mark Aurelio – Tour accountant
- Andrew Solomon – Parkwood accountant
- Danielle Triebner – Travel agent

Publicity

- Yvette Noel-Schure – Schure Media Group
- Jana Fleishman – Roc Nation
- Carl Fysh – Purple Pitt, United Kingdom

Ticket services

- Jessica Vaccino – VIP Nation manager
- Jeff Staadt – Parkwood VIP ticketing
- Elizabeth Pickrel – Live Nation ticketing
- Ian Opitz – VIP Nation

Merchandising

- Nick Jones – Global Merchandising Services Ltd.
- Kyle Compton – Global Merchandising Services Ltd.
- Jim Levin – Live Nation

Security

- Julius De Boer – Personal security
- Tom Langwiesner – Personal security
- Mark Williams – Personal security
- Scott Nichols – Venue security
- Bob Fontenot – Venue security
- Sarah O'Herlihy – Venue security

A creation of

- Parkwood Entertainment
- Roc Nation
- Columbia Records
- Life+Times

Sponsor

- Chase
