= Barker Black =

Barker Black, Ltd.
- Founded: 2005
- Headquarters: London, England
- Products: Shoes and Accessories
- Website: www.barkerblack.com

Barker Black is a British luxury footwear brand specializing in bench-made shoes for men. The Barker Black line is a subset of the English shoe company Barker, which was founded in 1880 by Arthur Barker. Launched in 2005 by creative director, Derrick Miller, the Barker Black brand quickly gained the attention of the fashion media, appearing in the premiere issue of Men's Vogue in September 2005. Subsequent coverage in men's fashion magazines such as Details, Esquire, and GQ followed. In 2007, Barker Black was chosen by GQ magazine as one of the best new designers in America.

The shoes are made in the classic English "Goodyear welted" construction and have a modern design feel while still classic. Many design elements of the shoes are updated takes on classic techniques, toe punching in the shape of the skull and crossbones logo and hand applied tacks to the waist of the shoe give them their unique character. The collection also includes men's accessories with a similar modern attitude.

Barker Black shoes are sold in its own boutiques in New York City and Los Angeles, as well in luxury department stores such as Bergdorf Goodman and Neiman Marcus. Its Elizabeth Street boutique in New York is listed on GQ's 100, the magazine's list of the best stores for men in America.
