= Joker's Closet =

- Company type: Private
- Genre: Ecommerce
- Founded: 2013; 13 years ago
- Headquarters: Toronto, Ontario, Canada
- Area served: Worldwide
- Key people: Ashley Ebner, founder, president & CEO
- Products: Shoes

Joker's Closet is an online shoe retailing company in Toronto, Canada. Customers can choose the colors they want for its ready-made designs.

== Description ==
Joker's Closet was launched in April 2013 by Toronto designer Ashley Ebner, who studied design at the London College of Fashion.

The brand was named after the Joker playing card, which allows multiple possibilities.

Customers can make their own choice of colors for the designs on the website. The shoes are made and delivered in three to four weeks.

Joker's Closet showed in collaboration with Korean designer Lie Sang Bong at Paris Fashion Week in October 2013, at New York Fashion Week on 12 February 2014, and at Seoul Fashion Week.

In June 2014 Joker's Closet became an official shoe designer for Beyoncé's On the Run Tour (Beyoncé and Jay-Z).

In February 2015 Joker's Closet became shortlisted by WGSN The Global Fashion Awards for Best E-Shop.
