= Susan Bennis/Warren Edwards =

American shoe company

Susan Bennis/Warren Edwards was a successful New York-based shoe company founded in 1972 by Susan Bennis and Warren Edwards. It dissolved in 1997.

== Career ==
Bennis is a graduate of New York's Fashion Institute of Technology. In 1972 Bennis and Edwards had the opportunity to purchase the New York outlet of The Chelsea Cobbler, a British shoe brand founded in 1967 by Richard Smith and Mandy Wilkins. At the time, Bennis and Edwards hoped to combine their clothing designs (marketed under the name Kiss) with Chelsea Cobbler's footwear, but quickly decided to focus exclusively on their own shoe designs, which they had made in Italy. By 1980, the Susan Bennis/Warren Edwards brand was known for expensive shoes with "outrageous" design elements such as unexpected material combinations, loud fabric prints, and elaborate decoration.

Susan Bennis/Warren Edwards clients included Bruce Springsteen, Jacqueline Kennedy Onassis, and Cher, who wore their shoes in Moonstruck. They maintained exclusivity by refusing to wholesale their shoes, selling only through their own shops at first. In 1993, they granted the department store Henri Bendel permission to retail their shoes and handbags, including a large number of store exclusives, although it had been reported a couple of years earlier by Women's Wear Daily that Neiman Marcus would market their line.

In 1990 Bennis and Edwards moved their flagship store to West 57th Street between Fifth and Sixth Avenues in New York City. It closed down in 1997, the same year the company disbanded.

Following the closure, Warren Edwards went solo the following year, opening a shop on Park Avenue, New York, where he was still based in 2010. In 2000, he was specialising in slightly modified classic styles of business and business-casual footwear for New York professionals.

== Awards ==
The firm won a Coty Award in 1982, and the Cutty Sark Award in 1984.

== Exhibitions ==
Examples of Susan Bennis/Warren Edwards shoes are housed in the Metropolitan Museum of Art's Costume Institute, the Victoria and Albert Museum, London, and the Philadelphia Museum of Art, who also hold some of their handbags.
