= Pretty Hurts =

2014 song by Beyoncé

Single by Beyoncé

from the album Beyoncé
- Released: June 10, 2014
- Studio: Kings Landing (Bridgehampton, New York); Jungle City; Oven (New York City)
- Genre: Power pop; soul
- Length: 4:17
- Label: Columbia
- Composers: Beyoncé Knowles; Joshua "Ammo" Coleman; Sia Furler
- Lyricist: Sia Furler
- Producers: Knowles; Ammo

Beyoncé singles chronology
| "Say Yes" (2014) | "Pretty Hurts" (2014) | "Flawless (Remix)" (2014) |

Music video
- "Pretty Hurts" on YouTube

"Pretty Hurts" is a song by American singer Beyoncé for her eponymous fifth studio album (2013). It was released on mainstream radio in the United States on June 10, 2014, as the fourth single from the album. The song was written by Sia, Ammo and Beyoncé and its production was handled by Beyoncé and Ammo. It is a power pop and soul ballad, instrumentally complete with a sparse background honed with the use of synths, minor chords and a "booming" drum beat. The track's lyrical content deals with subjects of third-wave feminism, self-empowerment and body image. Additionally, the song's lyrics deal with the consequences of society's high standards of beauty, and in "Pretty Hurts" eating disorders are depicted as one of the subjected results.

"Pretty Hurts" won in the category for Best Video with a Social Message at the 2014 MTV Europe Music Awards and was named the best track of 2014 by the Associated Press. Following the release of Beyoncé, the track charted in the lower regions internationally. It failed to enter the Billboard Hot 100 and peaked at number 63 on the UK Singles Chart. However, the song became Beyoncé's 21st number one on the US Hot Dance Club Songs chart, and was placed at number four on its 2014 year-end chart.

The accompanying music video for "Pretty Hurts" was directed by Melina Matsoukas, and features the singer competing in a beauty pageant. The clip was made available at iTunes Stores as part of the album's release on December 13, 2013. It also won a category for Best Cinematography along with Best Video with a Message at the 2014 MTV Video Music Awards. Rolling Stone included the clip in their year-end list of the 10 best music videos of 2014. Beyoncé performed "Pretty Hurts" during her co-headlining On the Run Tour (2014).

== Background and recording ==
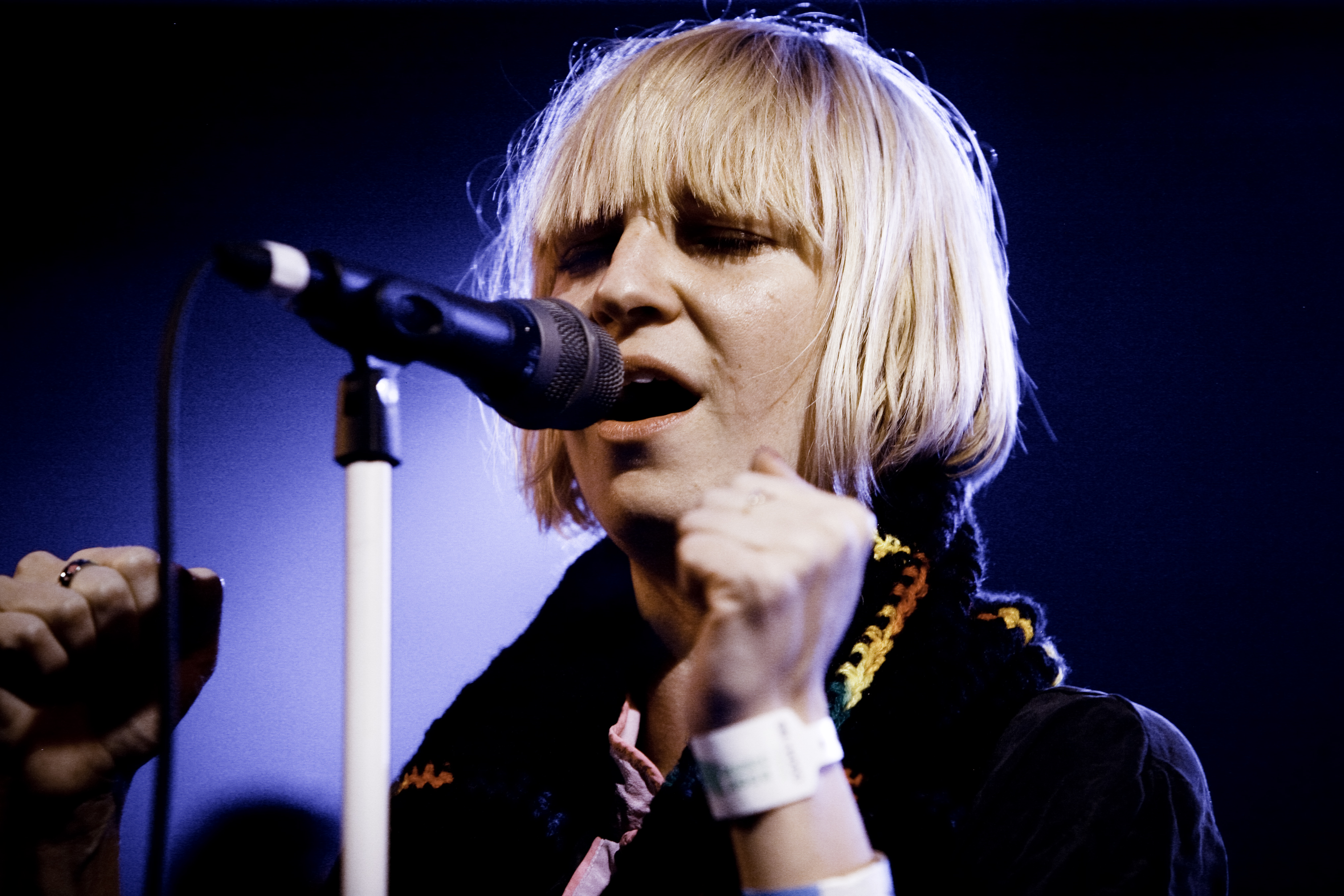
Sia co-wrote and provided background vocals for "Pretty Hurts".

"Pretty Hurts" was initially written by Australian musician Sia at her apartment in Angelino Heights, Los Angeles. She completed the song with American musician Ammo on the same day she recorded French DJ David Guetta's "Titanium" in 2011. Sia wrote "Pretty Hurts" with American singer Katy Perry in mind, and later e-mailed the song to her. However, Perry failed to read the email, and in what Sia described as an "awkward situation," she then sent the track to the management of Beyoncé and Barbadian singer Rihanna. The song was put on hold for eight months by Rihanna's management, who failed to pay the track's fee, and as a result Beyoncé "slid into home base and threw the money down" to secure "Pretty Hurts" for herself. Rihanna later decided to record another composition by Sia, "Diamonds", instead. In 2012, American producer Dr. Luke received Beyoncé's cut of "Pretty Hurts" and played it to Perry, who later text messaged Sia, saying, "I'm pretty hurt you never sent me this song". Sia then responded, stating, "Check your e-mail," to which Perry replied, "It was meant to be with Beyoncé of course".

During an interview with iTunes Radio in December 2013, Beyoncé said, "The second I heard the song, I'm like, 'I have to sing this song, I don't care how hard I have to fight for this song, this is my song'!" The singer also decided to record "Pretty Hurts" because she wanted to shift her focus to the beauty industry, which she felt was "the most humiliating, judgmental place you can be as a woman". She saw the track's theme as representation of "finding that thing in the world that makes you truly happy," and felt that the song was in line with the album's theme of "finding beauty in imperfections". Speaking to iTunes Radio, Beyoncé explained: "I feel like sometimes the world is a big contest, we're all being judged. I wanted to capture how humiliating and insecure that makes you feel."

Sia later mentioned online, in reply to a fan lamenting that her song "Elastic Heart" would have been a good single for Beyoncé, that she gave the singer "Pretty Hurts", her "other best song". The final version of the song was written by Sia, Beyoncé and Ammo, and its production was handled by the latter two, with Beyoncé also handling the vocal production. Sia sang background vocals. Rob Suchecki engineered and recorded the song's instrumental and intro synthesizer with Derek Dixie. Beyoncé's vocals were recorded by Stuart White who also handled the mixing of the song. "Pretty Hurts" was recorded in three studios: Kings Landing in Bridgehampton, and Jungle City Studios and Oven Studios in New York City. In the United Kingdom, the song was added to the playlist of BBC Radio 1 on June 2, 2014, and later impacted mainstream radio in the country on June 23. In the United States, "Pretty Hurts" impacted rhythmic radio on June 10, 2014, as the fourth single from Beyoncé.

== Composition ==
'Pretty Hurts'
A 24-second sample of "Pretty Hurts", featuring Beyoncé soliciting a strong, melancholy ballad vocal over the track's cinematic, sparse production; comprising R&B undertones and a hip hop groove.

A power pop and soul ballad, "Pretty Hurts" runs for a duration of four minutes and 17 seconds (4:17). It contains "mellow" R&B undertones, and a hip hop groove. Musically, the track's sparse background is honed with the use of synths, minor chords, and a "booming" drum beat. "Pretty Hurts" is set in the time signature of common time, with a slow tempo of 65 beats per minute. It is composed in the key of B major, with Beyoncé's vocals spanning the tonal nodes of F♯_{3} to E_{5}. The song follows a basic sequence of B-C♯m-G♯m-F♯ as its chord progression. Beyoncé's vocal performance in "Pretty Hurts" was likened by music critics to that of her 2008 single, "Halo". Una Mullally of The Irish Times commented that the track's sound recalled the works of American singer Pink. Writing for New York Magazine, Jody Rosen felt that "Pretty Hurts" was reminiscent of a more "robust" Barbra Streisand song. Jed Gottlieb of the Boston Herald likened the track's beat to the works of New Zealand singer Lorde. Chris Bosman from Consequence of Sound described "Pretty Hurts" as a "cinematic reach of modern Top 40 pop with the patience and melancholy of post-808s & Heartbreaks hip-hop." USA Today writer Korina Lopez opined that the song showcased a "darker side" to the singer.

The lyrics of "Pretty Hurts" are related to third-wave feminism and self-empowerment. It confronts society's standards and stereotypes with regard to female beauty. The song opens with a recorded snippet of a beauty pageant judge questioning Beyoncé on her life aspirations, to which she replies, "My aspiration in life would be... to be happy". The sample is used to frame the song in the context of the singer's childhood. According to Michael Cragg from The Guardian, the snippets were used to question the singer's "drive and desire that's got her to where she is today, and whether the struggle was entirely worth it". The song then transcends into a depiction of Beyoncé as a beauty pageant contest awaiting judgment in the lyrics, "Mama said, 'You're a pretty girl, what's in your head, it doesn't matter. Brush your hair, fix your teeth. What you wear is all that matters". The second verse of "Pretty Hurts"—"Blonder hair, flat chest/ TV says bigger is better/ South Beach, sugar free/ Vogue says thinner is better"—serve as an analysis of female body image and society's obsession with physical perfection.

According to Tris McCall of The Star-Ledger, the song implicates that "American women are flung from their cradles into competition with each other, and are coached to disguise their flaws and distrust any gesture toward solidarity." Additionally, the track's lyrics deal with the consequences of society's high standards of beauty, and in "Pretty Hurts" eating disorders are depicted as one of the subjected results. The track also sees Beyoncé denouncing "plastic smiles," and during the last verses she demands to "strip away the masquearede". Critics observed that "Pretty Hurts" promoted its listener's ambition for fame and personal growth. The song's lyrics garnered comparisons to TLC's "Unpretty" (1999), and Christina Aguilera's "Beautiful" (2002). Marc Hogan of Spin opined that "Pretty Hurts" resembled a speech accompanied by music and felt that it served as a political statement addressed to the beauty industry. Hogan's view was echoed by McCall of The Star-Ledger who wrote that had the song been performed by Phil Ochs in 1995, it "would have instantly recognized it as a protest number". McCall went on to opine that "Pretty Hurts" served a response to the criticism Beyoncé received for her performance of "The Star-Spangled Banner" during American president Barack Obama's second inauguration in 2013.

== Critical reception ==
Neil McCormick of The Daily Telegraph felt it was "a great opening track" for Beyoncé and lauded its "anthemic" chorus. Mesfin Fekadu of the Associated Press deemed the song "a supreme way" to open the album. musicOMH's Philip Matusavage wrote that "Pretty Hurts" manifested Beyoncé as a "definitive personal statement rather than just another Beyoncé album". The Guardian reviewer Michael Cragg listed the track as an "immediate" single choice on the album. Julia Leconte of Now opined that the song was "classic Beyoncé feminism" and quipped, "and if you're a sucker for girl-power hits like 'Irreplaceable', you'll have this one on repeat, too". While Claire Lobenfield of Complex stated, "What sounds like a classic Beyoncé female empowerment ballad cuts even deeper." Tim Finney of the same publication deemed the song a "heavy-handed future concert staple". Writing for the Los Angeles Times, Mikael Wood felt that with "Pretty Hurts," Beyoncé created "razzle-dazzle pop out of small-scale sentiments that might've seemed on paper like fodder for hushed ballads". Drowned in Sound writer Robert Leedham stated the track was "impeccably sung".

Tris McCall of The Star-Ledger commended the track's production and complimented Beyoncé for sounding "on the verge of tears" with her "vulnerable" vocal delivery. Newsday writer Glenn Gamboa felt the song was "dynamic musically and bold lyrically". "Pretty Hurts" was lauded as the "best thing on the album" and an "undeniably noble attempt to boost female morale" by Andy Gill of The Independent. Gill's view was shared by Consequence of Sound's Chris Bosman who felt the song's "dramatic and painful exploration of female beauty" made it a highlight on Beyoncé. Billboard journalists Andrew Hampp and Erika Ramirez commented, "Unlike [singers such as Celine Dion, Christina Aguilera and Rihanna], Beyoncé doesn’t just re-sing a Sia demo – she fully makes this self-empowerment anthem fully her own, with a powerhouse 'Halo'-esque vocal, and a bridge that could take you from Houston to Brooklyn in five seconds flat". The lyric, "It's my soul that needs surgery," was dubbed an "admittedly catchy slogan" by Slant Magazine's Sal Cinquemani. Writing for Slate, Dee Lockett called the track's introduction the "album's most empowering line". Jem Aswad of Spin called "Pretty Hurts" the pièce de résistance of Beyoncé and described it as "a shimmering, melancholy-yet-radio-friendly landscape that perfectly suits the song's heavy subject matter".

Entertainment Weekly reviewer Nick Catucci called the track a "mild album opener". The placement of "Pretty Hurts" was criticized by AbsolutePunk writer Ryan Dennehy, who went on to call the song "too safe at this point in her [Beyoncé's] career". Dennehy's view was echoed by Emily Mackay of NME who went on to deem the track "inauspicious" and felt its lyrical content was reminiscent of "a City banker lecturing you on the need for spiritual rather than material wealth". Philip Cosores of Paste commented, "'Pretty Hurts' opens the album with didactic rhetoric without the grace of subtlety, with its repeated conclusion that the 'soul needs surgery,' hardly a poetic payoff that listeners deserve". Under the Radar writer Ryan E.C. Hamm dismissed "Pretty Hurts" as a "flaw" on Beyoncé.

"Pretty Hurts" topped the Associated Press' top songs of 2014 list, in which they complimented the track's "heavy, deeply felt, emotional—but most important, beautiful" qualities, and felt that Beyoncé's "rising vocals" brought Sia's words to life. In the 2013 Pazz and Jop Music Critics Poll, the song was ranked at number 424. The song won in the category for Best Song with a Social Message at the 2014 MTV Europe Music Awards. At the 2014 Soul Train Music Awards, "Pretty Hurts" was nominated for The Ashford and Simpson Songwriter's Award.

== Commercial performance ==
Following the release of Beyoncé, "Pretty Hurts" charted in the lower regions internationally, and when released as a single, attained limited success commercially. The song failed to enter the US Billboard Hot 100, but peaked at number 13 on Bubbling Under Hot 100 Singles on January 11, 2014. The song bowed at number 38 on US Rhythmic Songs for the week ending July 5, 2014, and went on to peak at number 33. "Pretty Hurts was more successful on US Hot Dance Club Songs where it reached number 16 by July 12, 2014. The following week, it entered the top ten, setting a new peak of number nine. On August 30, 2014, "Pretty Hurts" topped US Hot Dance Club Songs and became Beyoncé's 21st number one hit on the chart. The song ended 2014 as the year's fourth most successful entry on US Hot Dance Club Songs. "Pretty Hurts" peaked at number 36 on US Hot R&B/Hip-Hop Songs, and at number 78 on the Canadian Hot 100.

In Australia, "Pretty Hurts" bowed at number 68 on the Australian Singles Chart for the week ending May 31, 2014. The following week, it climbed 21 positions to its peak of number 47, before falling off the chart the week after. In the United Kingdom, the song debuted at number 123 on the UK Singles Chart and number 12 on the UK R&B Chart on December 28, 2013. The following week, it climbed to number 93 on the singles chart. It went on to peak at number 63 on May 17, 2014, and became a top ten hit on the UK R&B Chart where it peaked at number eight on July 5, 2014. "Pretty Hurts" initially entered the Irish Singles Chart at number 82 on the chart issued for December 26, 2013, before dropping out the following week. On May 8, 2014, the song re-entered the chart at a new peak position of 56. Elsewhere, "Pretty Hurts" attained peaks of number 68 in Switzerland, number 83 in Germany, and number 87 in the Netherlands.

== Music video ==
=== Background and release ===
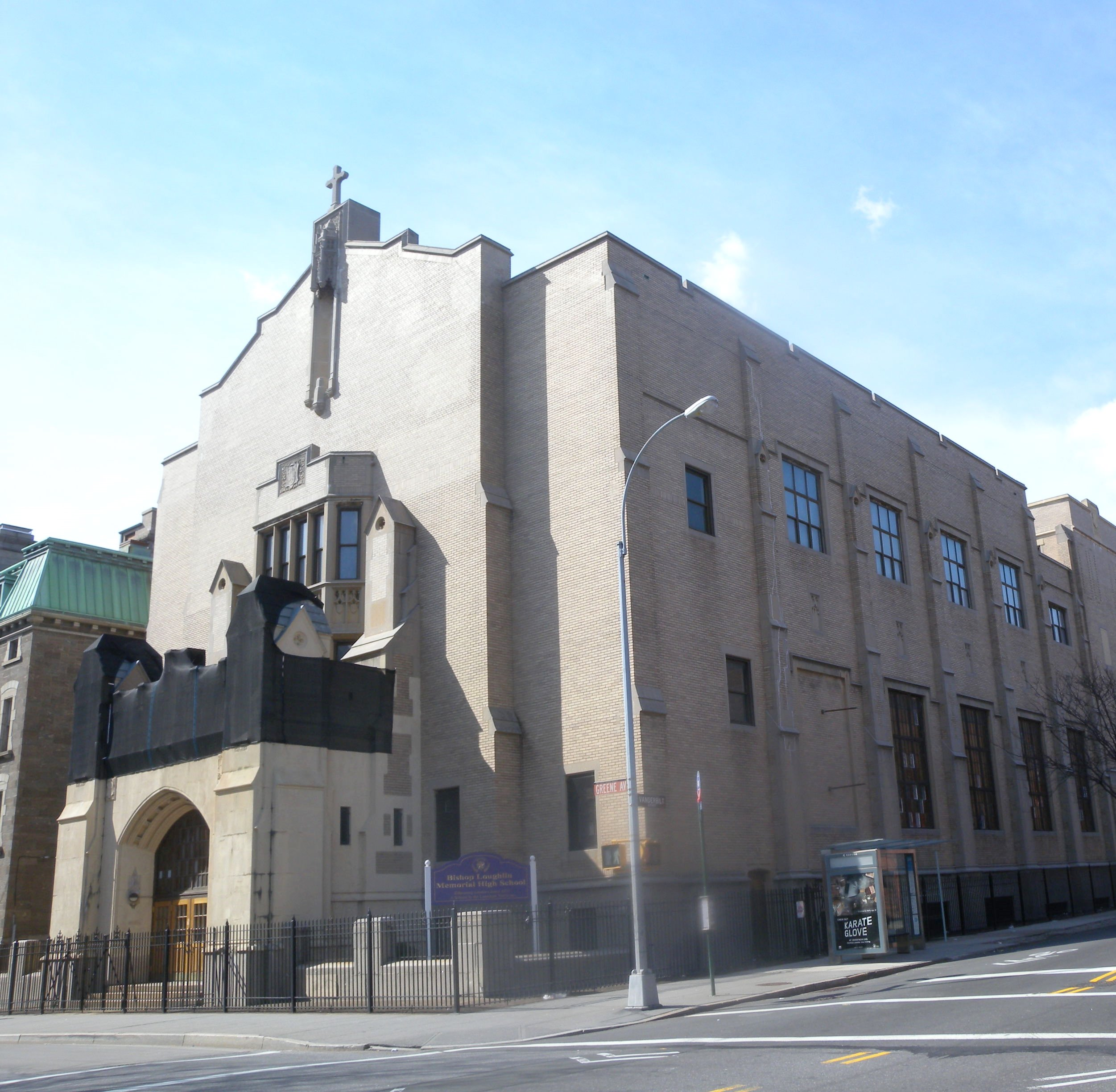
The music video was filmed at Bishop Loughlin Memorial High School.

The music video for "Pretty Hurts" was directed by Melina Matsoukas. It was filmed at Bishop Loughlin Memorial High School in Fort Greene, Brooklyn, between August 11 and 13, 2013. The filming of the clip saw an extended schedule surface with a variety scenes and concepts being developed during the ongoing shoot. As a result, several members of the crew quit the shoot, leaving Matsoukas with a limited team to work with. The small school in which the video's filming took place was intended to showcase "a small-town kind of pageant". According to Matsoukas, the location created a 1980s atmosphere combined with pin-up themes inspired by Blake Lively's character in the film The Town (2010). Several of the actresses portraying the beauty contestants in the video were models professionally, and shared their expertise for the clip's premise. The visual also sees a cameo appearance from American actor Harvey Keitel. Speaking about Keitel's involvement in an interview with New York Magazine, Matsoukas said that she wanted to use a "greasy, Vegas-type pageant character," and felt Keitel was well-suited for the role.

Beyoncé stated that she wanted to film the video to showcase the correlation of physical beauty and happiness in life, which serves as one of the song's themes. Speaking to MTV News, the singer mentioned: "It represents all of the things women go through to keep up with the pressure that society puts on us. I wanted to tap into the world of competition. Some of the things young women go through is just really heartbreaking for me." Matsoukas wanted "Pretty Hurts" to follow a premise reminiscent to that of a documentary, with most of its filming occurring organically and unplanned. In an interview with MTV News, Matsoukas commented on the music video's theme:

"Well I think we definitely wanted to speak to as many women as we could and all the pain and struggle that we go through as women to maintain this impossible standard of beauty. We wanted to give it a darker edge and take it there and not give you the Disney version of that struggle. And Beyoncé was more than willing to go that far with it. And I applaud her for that."

The music video for "Pretty Hurts" was released on December 13, 2013, to iTunes Stores, as part of the release of Beyoncé. On April 24, 2014, it was made available for viewing on the website of Time, to coincide with Beyoncé's cover feature on their Time 100 issue. To further promote the release, Beyoncé launched a website campaign—"What Is Pretty"—which asked fans to post photos and videos on Instagram, explaining their definition of beauty. The music video was released on Beyoncé's Vevo account on the same day as her Time feature and "What Is Pretty" launch. A behind the scenes segment of the music video was premiered on MTV and Vevo, also on April 24.

=== Development ===
"I had this image of these trophies and me accepting these awards and kind of training myself to be this champion. And at the end of the day when you go through all of these things, is it worth it? I mean, you get this trophy and you're like, 'I basically starved. I have neglected all of the people that I love. I've conformed to what everybody else thinks I should be and I have this trophy. What does that mean?' The trophy represents all of the sacrifice I have made as a kid, all of the time that I lost."

— Beyoncé discussing the concept of the music video for "Pretty Hurts".

The music video's beauty contest concept was proposed by Beyoncé. In an interview with New York Magazine, Matsoukas explained her response to Beyoncé's proposal: "I was like, 'Let's get into the toxic world and what we really do that is so damaging to ourselves, and use it as a microcosm for our society'. Obviously, those ideas don't just live in the pageant world; they live in our world. And that's what the song is about. And it felt like we had to take it there to make it have meaning, because otherwise it would be a superficial, preachy kind of song and visual." A scene from the clip which depicts Beyoncé preparing plastic surgery, consuming diet pills and vomiting, was initially excluded from the video's final cut. However, Beyoncé decided to include the scene to fulfill her role in the clip's premise. Another scene featuring Beyoncé drowning in water while the beauty contest's host questions her life aspirations, was originally intended to depict her falling onstage. However, the scene failed to surface because of time constraints.

Matsoukas initially planned the music video to visualize Beyoncé winning the contest, where she would realize that it was meaningless to her. However, Beyoncé suggested that an albino, fashion model Diandra Forrest, should serve as the contest's winner instead. Speaking to MTV News, Matsoukas elaborated: "We thought it was really important and interesting to break those ideas of what the classic beauty standards would be and to do this with this beautiful albino woman, I thought was really great. And to show 'Yeah she's not perfect, she doesn't always win and you put your best foot forward and you may still lose.'" The video's ending was originally intended to depict archival footage of American actresses Halle Berry and Vanessa A. Williams, to promote beauty for African-American women. However, Beyoncé sent a note to Matsoukas suggesting that footage from her childhood should be interpolated at the end of the song in order to connect it to the second music video from the album, "Ghost".

The scene where Beyoncé is pictured wrecking a shelf of trophies "represent[s] knocking down... beauty standards and falling into a victim of that". The scene was inspired by Matsoukas obtaining an image of Beyoncé, during her youth, pictured afront a shelf of her personal trophies. Matsoukas opined that "[trophies] don't bring you happiness, and don't move you forward in life". Jake Reed of The Daily Collegian interpreted the scene as a realization that the pressure of sustaining beauty is unworthy of the time and dedication spent on it. Beyoncé was styled by B. Akerlund for the music video. Her wardrobe included a 1920s rabbit ear headpiece as a means of innocence for her character in the clip. Her look was honed with a "We Are Handsome"-print bodysuit and a Dolce & Gabbana gold brace corset, as well as a tiara and sash during other scenes.

=== Synopsis ===
The seven-minute long video depicts Beyoncé playing a beauty pageant contest representing Third Ward, Houston, the area in which she grew up. It opens with the sound of a poignant piano and shots of Beyoncé sporting short hair, looking at herself in the mirror. It transitions to a segment of her fellow contestants preparing for the pageant backstage, combing their hair, fitting their dresses and analyzing their bodies; one scene during the preparations shows Beyoncé arguing with another contestant over a hair dryer. Multiple shots of the singer follow, of which depict her sitting on a floor and leaving a bathroom after vomiting. The clip then sees contestants looking tired and distressed backstage.

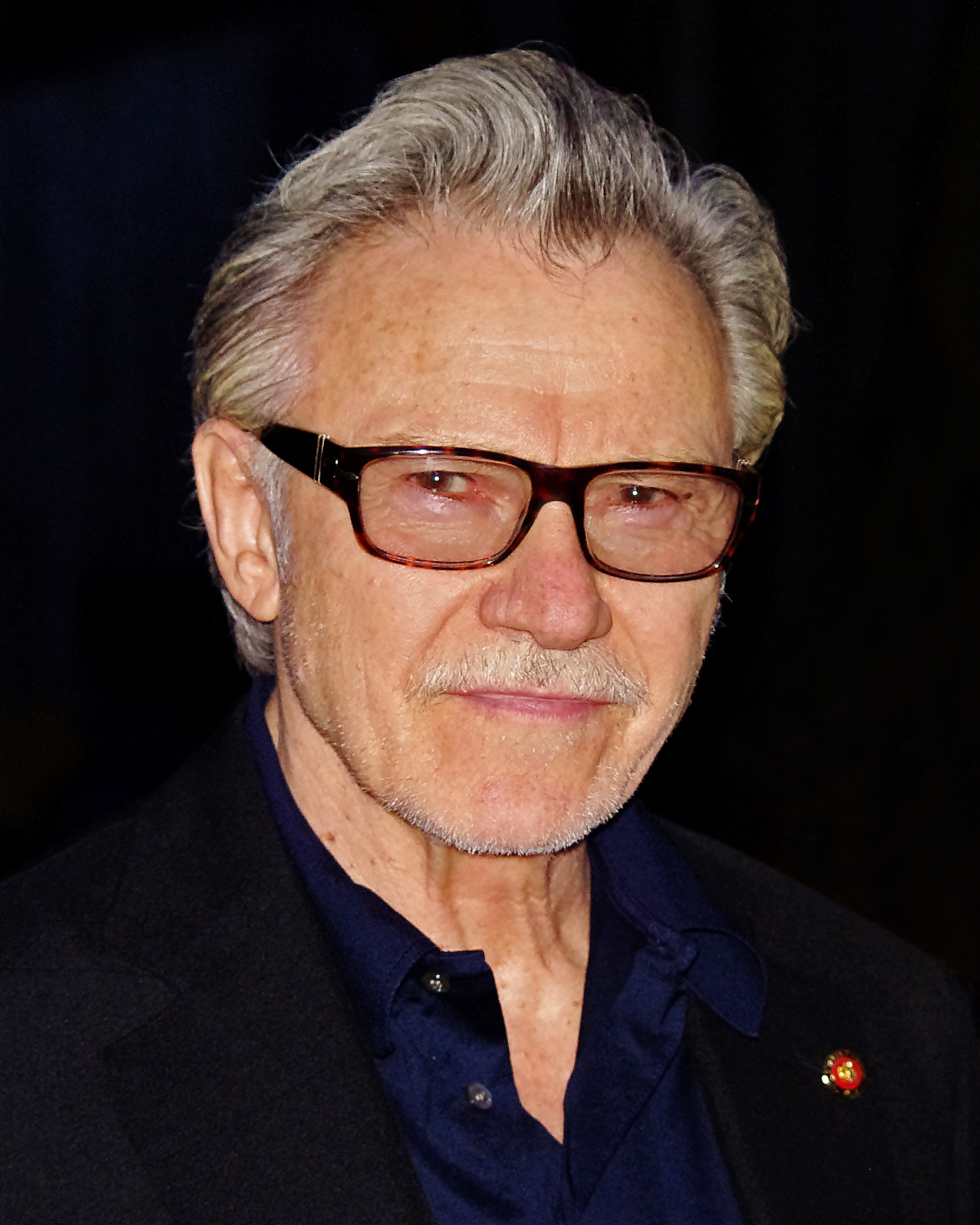
Harvey Keitel makes a cameo appearance in the video as the beauty pageant's host.

Beyoncé is then announced by the contest's host as "Miss 3rd Ward", and she then appears on stage, smiling and singing the first verse of the song a cappella. An applause follows from the crowd while the contest's judges write notes about her. The song then begins during a depiction of Beyoncé in the preparations for the show, in which she combs and sprays her hair, depilates her face and whitens her teeth. The scene transitions to a judge, played by the fashion model Shaun Ross, directing the contestants, during which Beyoncé is seen consuming diet pills. He measures her abdomen with tape and hits her thighs as an indication of preferred onstage behaviour. The second verse follows, during which Beyoncé is pictured exercising at her home and measuring her weight to her own dissatisfaction.

As the second verse finishes, the host calls Beyoncé on the stage and praises her for her performance at the competition, asking the crowd to applaud to the "beautiful and poised" in the contest. He then asks, "Miss 3rd Ward, your first question. What is your aspiration in life?", to which Beyoncé replies: "Oh, my aspiration in life? That's a great question. I wasn't expecting that question". During her reply, her voice is echoed repeating the question, and she is then pictured drowning in water and looking unhappy backstage. After the pause, Beyoncé answers, "My aspiration in life would be to be happy". The chorus then restarts with Beyoncé wrecking a shelf containing her personal trophies. She is also shown backstage, smearing her make-up, and vomiting in the bathroom. Another contestant is pictured eating cotton.

During the bridge of the song, the contestant is then visible at a hospital where a plastic surgeon injects botox into her face. In the scene, Beyoncé is pictured in a white straitjacket. She is then shown in another segment, being spray tanned in a bikini. At the end of the music video, Beyoncé loses the contest to a woman with albinism after which she happily congratulates her. The last scene depicts the singer looking happy and smiling with little make-up on her face. The final 30 seconds of the clip are intercepted into footage of Beyoncé, as a child, winning an award for Female Pop Vocalist on a television show. She appears onstage saying: "I would like to thank the judges for picking me, my parents who I love. I love you Houston".

=== Reception ===
According to Dan Crane of The New York Times, "Pretty Hurts" was the music video that garnered the most attention following the release of Beyoncé. Slant Magazine's Sal Cinquemani commented that the song sounded more "immersive" accompanied by its music video. Similarly, NME's Emily Mackay who gave a mixed review for the song, felt that its visual "[saved] the day", and deemed the scene where Beyoncé wrecks her trophy shelf as "powerful". Jon Blistein of Rolling Stone called the video "intense" and "touching," wrote that the "shots of her bashing her trophy shelf prove way more cathartic than any pageant victory". Kitty Empire of The Observer commented that the video contained perspective in the scenes depicting "painful depilating, pill-popping and toilet-hugging details". Vanity writer Michelle Collins felt that the singer managed to make exercising look difficult and uncomfortable, and praised the scene where Beyoncé responds to the pageant judge questioning her life aspirations. Spin's Philip Sherburne alluded that the video was emotional and wrote that it offered "a story line that opens up a wealth of readings about race, skin tone, beauty standards, and her [Beyoncé's] own mutable image." Whitney Phaneuf from the website HitFix praised Beyoncé's acting in the video and added that the vulnerability in the character she portrayed was "palpable". Phaneuf went on to opine that the footage of Beyoncé competing in a talent show as a child made the clip look more realistic. Ryan B. Patrick of Exclaim! wrote that the video allowed Beyoncé to showcase her acting abilities. The editors of Out magazine likened the clip to the films Magic Mike (2012) and American Hustle (2013).

The cohesion of the track's lyrics with the video was commended by critics, with Evan Rytlewski of The A.V. Club noting that it allowed Beyoncé to "[open] herself up in ways she's resisted before". Greg Kot of the Chicago Tribune who lauded the song as a "soaring critique of the beauty industry", added that it was "enhanced by its troubling video". Marc Hogan of Spin magazine commented that the visual expanded on the message of the song, and deemed it a "powerful piece of work". Tris McCall of The Star-Ledger wrote in his review of the song that its "brutal" music video took the critique of perfection and physical beauty further than what the track did. Brandon Sodeber of the magazine Vice called the visual the best on Beyoncé and opined that it was "an incredibly affecting mini-melodrama that underlines to Beyoncé's painful awareness that being black and female means you're never enough of something or other for mainstream America". However, Neil McCormick of The Daily Telegraph felt that the video sent mixed messages. Brent DiCrescenzo from Time Out complimented Keitel's appearance in the clip, but criticized the visual's message because he felt that it came from "one of the most beautiful women in the world".

Questions raised by critics mainly concerned the irony and hypocrisy of the lyrics of the song and its video. Philip Cosores of Paste felt that with the music video, Beyoncé disrespected the message she sent through the song and felt that it was notable enough to stand on its own. Similarly, Shannon Kelley for TakePart said that the song "offers an honest commentary on an important reality", but highlighted the irony of its music video and felt that it manifested that "[Beyoncé is] not immune to the disease". Randal Roberts of the Los Angeles Times quipped, "She makes a convincing case, were it not for the string of nearly soft-core fashion shoots that follow [on the album]... As a first song on an album, 'Pretty Hurts' works. But as thematic opener to such a relentless visual seduction, the hypocrisy is hard to ignore." Although Daisy Buchanan of The Daily Telegraph praised the message of the song and its video, she wrote in her review that the clip was "pure hypocrisy" because she opined that Beyoncé had promoted "heavily sexualised and unattainable standards" with her body throughout her career.

=== Awards and recognition ===
Michael Cragg of The Guardian ranked the video for "Pretty Hurts" in the ten best of Beyoncé's career. Cragg deemed the clip "gorgeously shot" and opined that its magazine shoot style "slightly subverted by barely veiled sadness and tight rictus grins". At the 2014 MTV Video Music Awards, the clip was nominated in four categories: Best Editing, Best Direction, Best Cinematography Best Video with a Message, ultimately winning the latter two. Jessica Suarez of Rolling Stone included the clip in her year-end list of the ten best music videos of 2014.

== Live performances and other versions ==
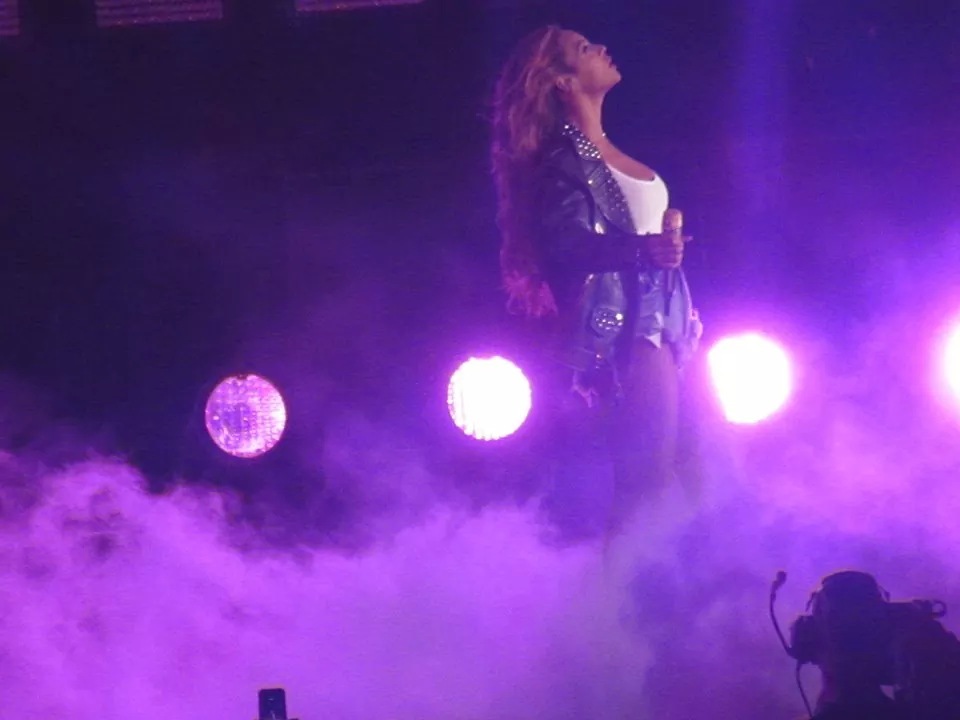
Beyoncé performing the song in Seattle during the On the Run Tour (2014).

"Pretty Hurts" was part of the set list for Beyoncé and Jay-Z's co-headlining On the Run Tour (2014). For the performances of the song, Beyoncé sports a leather-studded jacket with the word "Texas" emblazoned in capital letters across its back, along with denim short pants. The outfits were designed by Nicola Formichetti who took inspiration from Beyoncé's music video for "'03 Bonnie & Clyde", outlaw motorcycle clubs, and included references to her daughter Blue Ivy. Billboard editor Leila Cobo felt that the inclusion of the song in the set list served as a "stab" at feminism for her audience. In a review of one of the tour's concerts, Houston Chronicle writer Joey Guerra opined the song was oddly placed in the set list, but wrote that it "somehow worked perfectly as a late-set crescendo". The Times-Picayune editor, Keith Spera, felt that the singer "lofted" the song in its live renditions.

On January 14, 2014, American singer Sam Tsui released an acoustic cover version of "Pretty Hurts" on the iTunes Store. An early instrumental of "Pretty Hurts" was used for Gucci's Chime for Change campaign in 2013, before the song's official release. At the time, it served as an audio accompaniment for the campaign's films. On June 3, Dutch disc jockey R3hab released an uptempo electro house remix of the song during a concert for Gucci's Chime for Change, in honor of the one-year anniversary of its launching. Idolator's Mike Wass praised the remix's "killer drop" and called it "on-point from beginning to end".

== Credits and personnel ==
Song

- Beyoncé – vocals, production, vocal production, music
- Sia – lyrics, music, background vocals
- Ammo – production, music
- Stuart White – recording, mixing
- Ramon Rivas – second engineering
- Rob Suchecki – second engineering
- Derek Dixie – intro additional synth and SFX
- James Krausse – mastering

Video

- Featuring – Harvey Keitel
- Director – Melina Matsoukas
- Directors of photography – Darren Lew, Jackson Hunt
- Executive producers – Candice Ouaknine, Kerstin Emhoff
- Producers – Ross Levine, Candice Ouaknine, Karl Reid
- Production company – Pretty Bird
- Choreography – Frank Gatson
- Stylist – B. Åkerlund
- Additional styling – Ty Hunter, Raquel Smith
- Additional feature – Shaun Ross
- Pageant girls – Chloe Grade, Desiree, Naoumie Ekiko, Diandra Forrest, Maggie Geha, Jelena, Kaven, Gabby Kniery Kelsey Lear Lafferty, Veronica M, Renee Mittelstaedt, Jessica Novais, Sarah O, Talie Powell, Jae Ponder, Sarah Sarina, Jessica Sheenan Nikeva Stapleton, Stephanie Starface, Aster Thomas
- Production designers – Jane Herships, Kristen Vallow
- Editor – Jeff Seelis @ Bonch
- Brand manager – Melissa Vargas
- Hair – Kim Kimble
- Additional hair – Neal Farinah
- Make-up – Francesca Tolot
- Nails – Lisa Logan
- Color correction – Dave Hussey
- Visual effects – Kroma
- Photography – Nick Farrell

Credits adapted from Beyoncé's website.

== Charts ==
=== Weekly charts ===
| Chart (2014–15) | Peak position |
|---|---|
| Australia (ARIA) | 47 |
| Belgium Urban (Ultratop Flanders) | 22 |
| Belgium (Ultratip Bubbling Under Flanders) | 8 |
| Canada Hot 100 (Billboard) | 78 |
| Europe (Billboard) | 67 |
| France (SNEP) | 133 |
| Germany (GfK) | 83 |
| Ireland (IRMA) | 56 |
| Israel (Media Forest) | 3 |
| Netherlands (Single Top 100) | 87 |
| Scottish Singles Sales (Official Charts) | 60 |
| South Korea (GAON) | 46 |
| Switzerland (Schweizer Hitparade) | 68 |
| UK Singles (Official Charts) | 63 |
| UK Hip Hop/R&B (Official Charts) | 8 |
| US Bubbling Under Hot 100 (Billboard) | 13 |
| US Hot R&B/Hip-Hop Songs (Billboard) | 36 |
| US R&B/Hip-Hop Airplay (Billboard) | 50 |
| US Dance Club Songs (Billboard) | 1 |
| US Rhythmic Airplay (Billboard) | 33 |

=== Year-end charts ===
| Chart (2014) | Position |
|---|---|
| Belgium Urban (Ultratop Flanders) | 56 |
| US Hot Dance Club Songs (Billboard) | 4 |

== Certifications ==
| Region | Certification | Certified units/sales |
|---|---|---|
| Australia (ARIA) | Platinum | 70,000^{‡} |
| Brazil (Pro-Música Brasil) | Diamond | 250,000^{‡} |
| Canada (Music Canada) | Platinum | 80,000^{‡} |
| New Zealand (RMNZ) | Platinum | 30,000^{‡} |
| United Kingdom (BPI) | Gold | 400,000^{‡} |
| United States (RIAA) | 2× Platinum | 2,000,000^{‡} |
^{‡} Sales+streaming figures based on certification alone.

== Release history ==
| Country | Date | Format | Label |
|---|---|---|---|
| United States | June 10, 2014 | Rhythmic contemporary radio | Columbia |
| United Kingdom | June 23, 2014 | Contemporary hit radio | Columbia |

== See also ==
- List of number-one dance singles of 2014 (U.S.)
