= Daniella Shevel =

American women's footwear designer

- Born: Johannesburg, South Africa
- Education: University of Southern California
- Occupation: Fashion designer
- Years active: 2018–present
- Website: daniellashevel.com

Daniella Shevel is a New York-based, South African and American women's footwear designer and founder of the eponymous shoe brand.

== Early life ==
Daniella was born in Johannesburg, South Africa. Her family moved to California when she was at 17 years old age, where she graduated from the University of Southern California.

== Career ==
Daniella worked in digital marketing teams of Rag & Bone and Shopbop. Per her early childhood influence from Jimmy Choo and her passion for shoes, in 2018 founded her namesake brand. The designer has a flagship store in New York City's West Village neighborhood. Daniella's shoes are sourcing thicker heels, adding extra cushion to insoles, and choosing the softest and highest quality materials. All shoes are handcrafted in Brazil and Italy. Some of her square toe boots are reminiscent of the 90's along with snake skin patterns. Her shoes were showcased at 2023 runway show and presentation at New York Fashion Week.
