= Inch2 =

Latvian shoe brand

- The Inch2 logo
- Product type: Shoe; footwear; handbags; accessories
- Country: Latvia
- Introduced: 21 December 2014; 11 years ago
- Markets: Worldwide
- Website: www.inch2.com
- Type: Limited
- Industry: Fashion
- Founded: September 2014
- Founders: Olga Peterson; Eduards Petersons
- Headquarters: Riga, Latvia
- Number of employees: 20

Inch2 (stylized as I N C H ^{2} and pronounced as Inch two) is a shoe brand founded in 2014 by Olga and Edward Peterson, based in Riga, Latvia. Inch2 specializes in handcrafted masculine-style women's and men's footwear.

== History ==
=== Background ===
The Inch2 founders are Olga and Edward Peterson, a Latvian couple. Olga Peterson (born in Riga, Latvia) is an architect who earned her bachelor's degree in architecture from the Middlesex University in London. Olga used to write about design and fashion ideas for her fashion blog Zrivnutro, as well as for the Latvian fashion magazine Pastaiga. Edward Peterson is an online marketing specialist.

In September 2014, the Petersons started a company named Animo Forti ltd., which has been running operations for the brand from the start.

=== Brand creation and growth ===
Although the brand launched in 2014, the idea of handcrafted shoes occurred much before. The Petersons, using their existing experience, decided to combine the benefits of e-commerce technology and the unusual shoe design to launch their brand. The duo began the brand with five shoe styles. Shoe production started at a small shoemaker workshop in Riga, which handcrafted a few pairs per day.

In March 2015, the Inch2 founder, Olga Peterson, became a winner of Debut of the Year in Fashion nomination by the Baltic Fashion Federation, within the Riga Fashion Week event. Due to the high demand for shoes and the necessity to improve the shoe quality, as well as to increase volume, they moved shoe production out of Latvia. Shortly, new production partners found in Portugal. With the help of the new partners, the brand began to develop several women and men’s lines, as well as handbags. The same shoemakers produce for some of the most well-known luxury brands.

In January 2018, the brand had a collaboration with a Georgian singer Keti Topuria and her fashion brand KETIone at the Mercedes-Benz Fashion Week Russia. In 2018, the brand reached over one million euros in online sales during the Black Friday.

In June 2019, the brand collaborated with Pauline Ducruet, the eldest daughter of Princess Stéphanie of Monaco, and her fashion brand Alter at the Men's Fashion Week Spring/Summer 2020 in Paris.

== Design and products ==
Inch2 footwear is a blend of masculine allure and feminine elegance for women who prefer the masculine style and for men who don't forget about style in detail. There are three principles for which the brand stands for: style, comfort, and quality. Their shoes are classic in material and production but modern in style, with details and colors that make them unique and on-point. The brand footwear is made of leather from Italy and Portugal.

== Awards and honors ==
- The winner of the Debut of the Year in Fashion nomination by Riga Fashion Week (March 2015)
- 2× Best Digital Marketing nomination by Riga Fashion Week (March 2018 and March 2019)

== Controversy ==
- The Consumer Rights Protection Center (CRPC) fined the Latvian company Animo Forti, which runs the www.inch2.com online store, 10 thousand euros for violating the rights of more than a hundred consumers. The firm has been ordered to stop dishonest commercial practices, according to the CPPC Latvia.
- As of 2019, CRPC had received a total of 118 consumer complaints, including from consumers in other EU member states, regarding the company's commercial practices, the amount of unpaid money to consumers in the amount of approximately EUR 21,000 for unfulfilled orders and returned goods to the public in case of right of withdrawal.
