= Warren Edwards =

American shoe designer

Warren Edwards is a shoe designer. He was born in London and moved to New York City in his early 20s. Along with Susan Bennis, he co-founded and designed shoes under the name Susan Bennis/Warren Edwards. Following the closure of the company in 1997, Edwards went solo in 1998, opening a shop on Park Avenue, New York, where he was still based in 2010. In 2000, he was specialising in slightly modified classic styles of business and business-casual footwear for New York professionals.

In 1991, Edwards was the Grisham-Trentham lecturer at the Auburn University School of Human Sciences.

== See also ==
- List of Auburn University people
