= Vanessa Noel =

American fashion designer

Venessa Noel
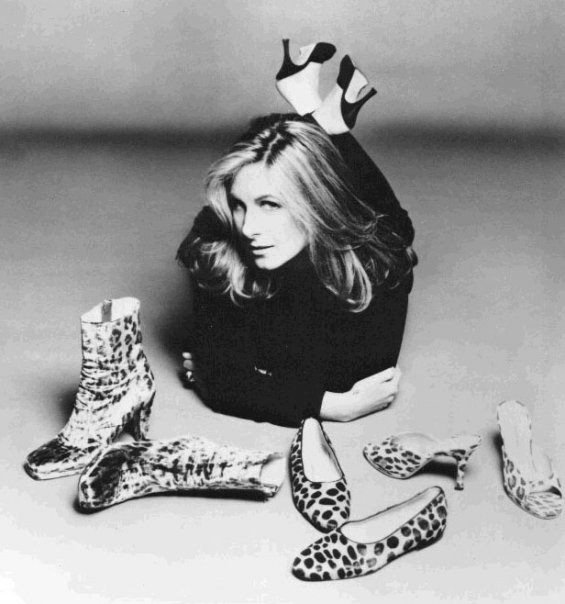
- Born: October 12, 1961 (age 64); Bryn Mawr, Pennsylvania
- Education: B.A. Fine Arts
- Alma mater: Cornell University
- Occupations: Shoe designer, hotelier, gallery owner, and philanthropist
- Board member of: Council member - Ocena Council member - Kipton Arts Foundation
- Website: https://www.vanessanoel.com

Vanessa Noel (born October 12, 1961) is an American shoe designer, hotelier, gallery owner, and philanthropist.

== Biography ==
Vanessa Noel was born and raised in Bryn Mawr, Pennsylvania. She was presented at the Philadelphia Charity Ball in Philadelphia, Pennsylvania, and the International Debutante Ball in New York City.

She attended Cornell University in New York, where she graduated with a degree in Fine Arts and Architecture. After graduation, she launched her first shoe line in 1987.

In 2015, Vanessa Noel spoke at the Women in the World Annual Summit along with Barbra Streisand, Jennifer Ashton, and Dr. Holly Anderson to discuss heart disease and the gender bias in medicine.

As of 2019, Noel served on the board of Hanover Charities.

== Career ==
=== Designer ===
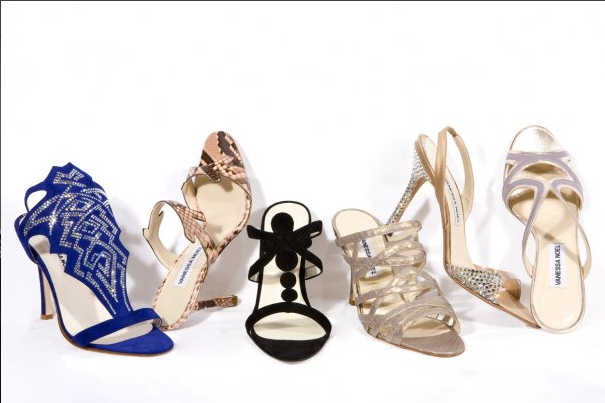
Sandals designed by Vanessa Noel

Early in her career, Noel was known to draw the inspiration for her shoes from her architectural background. She said “I view my shoes as sensual art objects. I create them to be both an individual sculpture and a natural, elegant extension of a woman’s leg.” Her shoes are in the collections of the Metropolitan Museum of Art in New York City and the Museum of Fine Arts in Boston, MA.

Noel is the sole designer for her label. She regularly travels to Italy, India and Kashmir, to work with various artisans. The shoes she produces use products only from Italian tanneries. These tanneries create exotic skins and furs, such as sable, python, and alligator. She also supports the organic and free trade industries, using eco-friendly materials. Her collections are handcrafted in Milan, Italy, with each style produced in limited editions.

In 1988, she designed a pair of satin pumps encrusted with 177.85 carats of rubies, which she sold in her store for $15,000. The Vanessa Noel label also include bridal shoes, men's footwear, cashmere shawls, and other accessories.

In 2004, Noel debuted the stretch alligator boots that became her signature. The boots appeared on Kim Cattrall in the Sex and the City movie in 2008.

In 2015, Vanessa Noel launched her first handbag collection and her first fragrance named Stiletto in the form of a scented candle.

Vanessa Noel's shoes have appeared in Sex And The City, Oprah, the Martha Stewart show, NBC News, music videos for Mary J. Blige and Janet Jackson, and many fashion magazines. Her footwear products have also been used in the runway shows of Nicole Miller, Rebecca Moses, Chadwick Bell, Keith Lissner, Ralph Lauren and Ralph Rucci's shows in both Paris and New York.

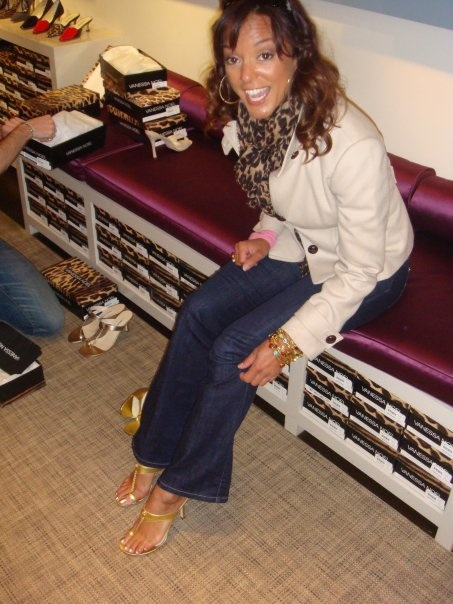
Eva Larue trying on sandals at the Vanessa Noel boutique in New York

=== Business ===
In October 1987, Noel simultaneously launched her fashion label and her first boutique on East 66th Street and Madison Avenue, across the street from Imelda Marcos'’ old townhouse. In 1990, she was asked to join the Council of Fashion Designers of America (CFDA) with recommendation letters written by Carolina Herrera, Carolyn Roehm and the CFDA director at the time, Fern Mallis.

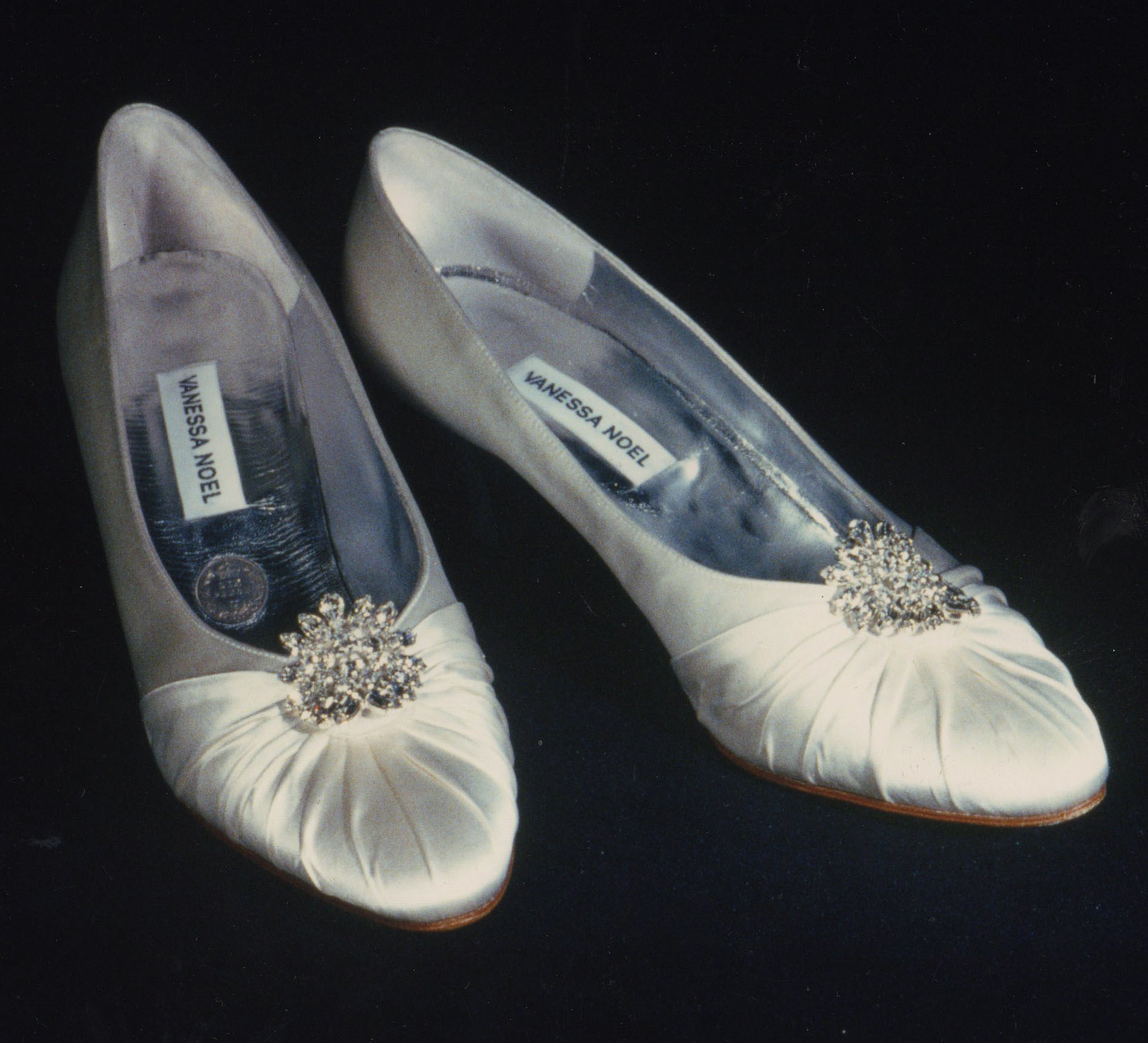
The shoes Vanessa Noel designed for Mariah Carey's wedding in 1993

Noel introduced her couture bridal collection in 1990, which was sold in her own boutique as well as at Bergdorf Goodman and Neiman Marcus. Shortly after the collection's launch, Noel designed a pair of shoes for Mariah Carey's wedding to Tommy Mottola in 1993. Noel's bridal collection was well-received, and Vera Wang asked Noel to do her first collection of bridal shoes.

In 1994, Noel opened her second boutique in Nantucket, Massachusetts, where she spent her childhood summers, and her boutique was the first New York boutique to open a location on Nantucket Island.

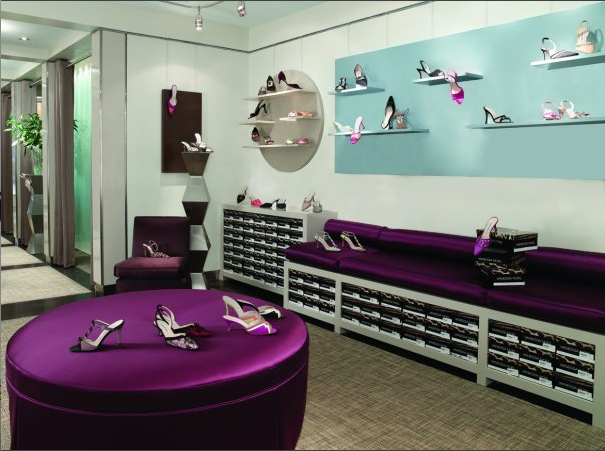
Architect's rendering of the Vanessa Noel New York boutique

In 1998, Noel designed a collection for C. Z. Guest, inspired by Guest's love of gardening. The limited-edition CZ by Vanessa Noel collection was sold at Bergdorf Goodman and Neiman Marcus stores.

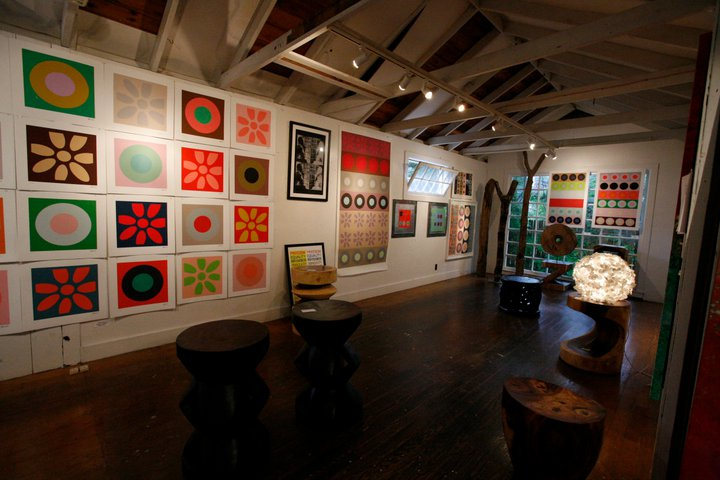
Vanessa Noel's Seven Seas gallery with a display of work by the late artist Peter Gee

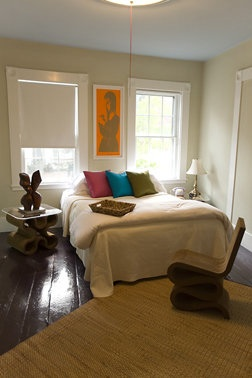
A room in the Vanessa Noel Hotel Green on Nantucket Island

Noel opened her flagship boutique on East 64th Street in October 2004. She designed the nearly 2,000-square-foot space herself.

=== Vanessa Noel Hotel ===
In the summer of 2002, Noel became the first American designer to own her own hotel with the launch of the Vanessa Noel Hotel. Also, the first boutique hotel in Nantucket, the VNH is home to a Vanessa Noel shoe boutique and the Café V bar, where Noel titled the menu “How to Look Good in Your Shoes” and offered high-end food. Noel opened her second hotel, Nantucket's first, and still only as of 2013, boutique hotel, the Vanessa Noel Hotel Green.

The Vanessa Noel Hotel on Nantucket closed in December 2017. The hotel, along with Vanessa Noel Hotel Green, operated from April 2005 to December 2017.

=== Philanthropy ===
Hanover Charities

In the years 2005, 2010, 2012, and 2017, Noel chaired the Hanover Charities Sugarcane Ball, a fundraising event that is held annually at Round Hill in Jamaica. In 2017, Vanessa Noel, along with Hanover Charities, helped raise a record amount of $474,360 to assist individuals and institutions in the parish. She also holds a Jamaican-themed fundraising event in her shoe boutique before the Sugarcane Ball to raise money for Hanover Charities.

Oceana

Noel became an Oceana Council member in 2010 and regularly chairs fundraising events for the organization. Noel also designed a special edition Oceana shoe that was auctioned on Charitybuzz with proceeds benefiting the organization.

Kipton Art Foundation

In 2010, she became a Vice Council Member of the Kipton Art Foundation, which works to provide artists with stipends to produce their work and to promote up and coming artists.

Other charitable contributions include:

- The Princess Grace Foundation
- Community Research Institute "Heart & Soul" Benefit Committee Member (1990)
- The Fashion Center NYC Bid for Kids Designer Committee Member (1997)
- VP of the East 64th Street Block Association (2009)
- Fair Fund (2009)
- Bailey's & Clothes Off Our Backs (2009)
- Philabunndance (2011) Noel donated proceeds from sales following her talk at the Brown Brothers Harris Women's Forum.
- Recipient of The Salute To Style Award benefiting the Madison Square Boys & Girl's Club (2017)
- Designed a one of a kind jacket for the DIFFA Dallas auction (2017)

=== TV appearances ===
Vanessa Noel has appeared on the following television shows:

- Rachael Ray $40 A Day (February 4, 2005)
- The Martha Stewart Show (Date ? & January 2011)
- The Real Housewives of New York (2011, 2015, 2017)
- Oprah: Where Are They Now? (2016)
- Open House (2016)
- CBS News (2016)

=== Books ===
Vanessa Noel was featured in the following books:

- Designers On Instagram: #fashion (2015)
- IMPACT: 50 Years of the Council of Fashion Designers of America (2012)
- Silver Girl (2011)
- American Fashion Travel (2011)
- American Fashion Designers at Home (2010)
- Caribbean Hideaways (2010)
- American Fashion Accessories (2008)
- Hip Hotels (2003)
- Nantucket Nights (2002)
- The Business of Bliss (1999)
