= Common Projects =

Shoe company

- Traded as: Private
- Industry: Fashion
- Founded: 2004; 22 years ago
- Founder: Prathan Poopat, Flavio Girolami
- Products: Footwear
- Website: www.commonprojects.com

Common Projects is an American luxury footwear company founded in 2004 by Prathan Poopat, an American-based fashion designer, and Flavio Girolami, an Italian creative consultant. The shoes are made in Italy, and often use Italian Nappa leather.

== History ==
The company name came about as Poopat and Girolami were working on some 'common' projects together, the original 'Achilles' shoe included, while living in separate countries. All of their shoes feature a line of numbers along the heel, displaying the style, the size and color, respectively. In the brand's early years, these numbers could be rubbed off, but now, they are branded in gold foil.

Common Projects were named "Sneaker of the Week" twice by GQ magazine.
