= Wedding of Taylor Swift and Travis Kelce =

2026 wedding in New York City, U.S.

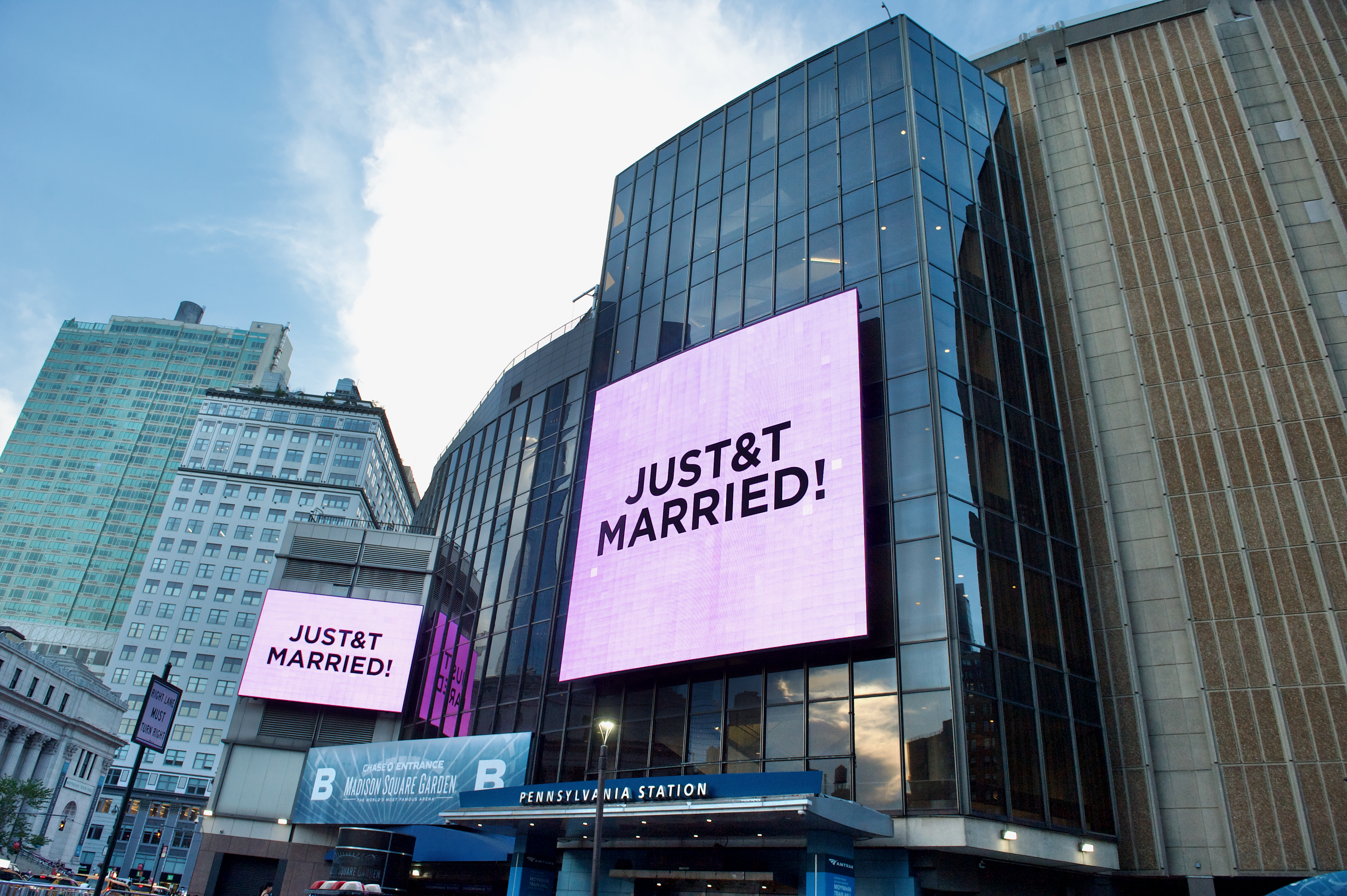
- Billboards announcing Swift and Kelce's marriage outside Madison Square Garden
- Date: July 3, 2026; 4 months ago
- Time: c. 5:30 p.m. ET (UTC−04:00)
- Venue: Madison Square Garden
- Location: New York City, New York, U.S.
- Participants: Taylor Swift; Travis Kelce

The American singer-songwriter Taylor Swift and the American football player Travis Kelce married on July 3, 2026, in a private ceremony at the Madison Square Garden (MSG) in Manhattan, New York City. The pair confirmed their relationship in September 2023, and after two years of dating, they became engaged in August 2025, when Kelce proposed to Swift at a garden in Lee's Summit, Missouri. Their engagement announcement on Instagram became one of the most-liked posts on the platform, and their nuptials generated extensive press coverage.

Swift and Kelce did not publicize the wedding venue, planning, or guest list, which therefore became topics of widespread media speculation up until the wedding day. The couple chose MSG, an indoor arena, as the venue for its large, secure, and enclosed space. An intimate rehearsal dinner took place on July 2, 2026, with 100 guests at the Infosys Theater. It was followed by an extravagant wedding ceremony on the arena floor, transformed into a decorated garden, on July 3. The ceremony was attended by about 1,000 friends and colleagues of the couple, including celebrities and public figures from the music, film, television, sports, fashion, and media industries, who also signed non-disclosure agreements.

French luxury brands Dior, Christian Louboutin, and Cartier designed the matrimonial attire of Swift and Kelce. The American actor Adam Sandler officiated the ceremony, and the couple's siblings Austin Swift and Jason Kelce served as the man of honor and best man, respectively. Music artists Paul McCartney, Stevie Nicks, Tim McGraw, Avril Lavigne, Ciara, Fergie, Tate McRae, and Ice Spice performed at the wedding. Restaurants Sartiano's and Zero Bond catered the occasion. The Government of New York City granted a special-event permit, with the couple covering the expenses incurred by the security and traffic control provided by the New York City Police Department (NYPD). With both Swift and Kelce being influential figures in the entertainment industry, many journalists and cultural critics described the wedding as an American royal function and a symbolic union of football and pop music. The complete absence of any photos or videos of the wedding from the Internet, despite its scale and coverage, has been a subject of media fascination.

== Engagement ==
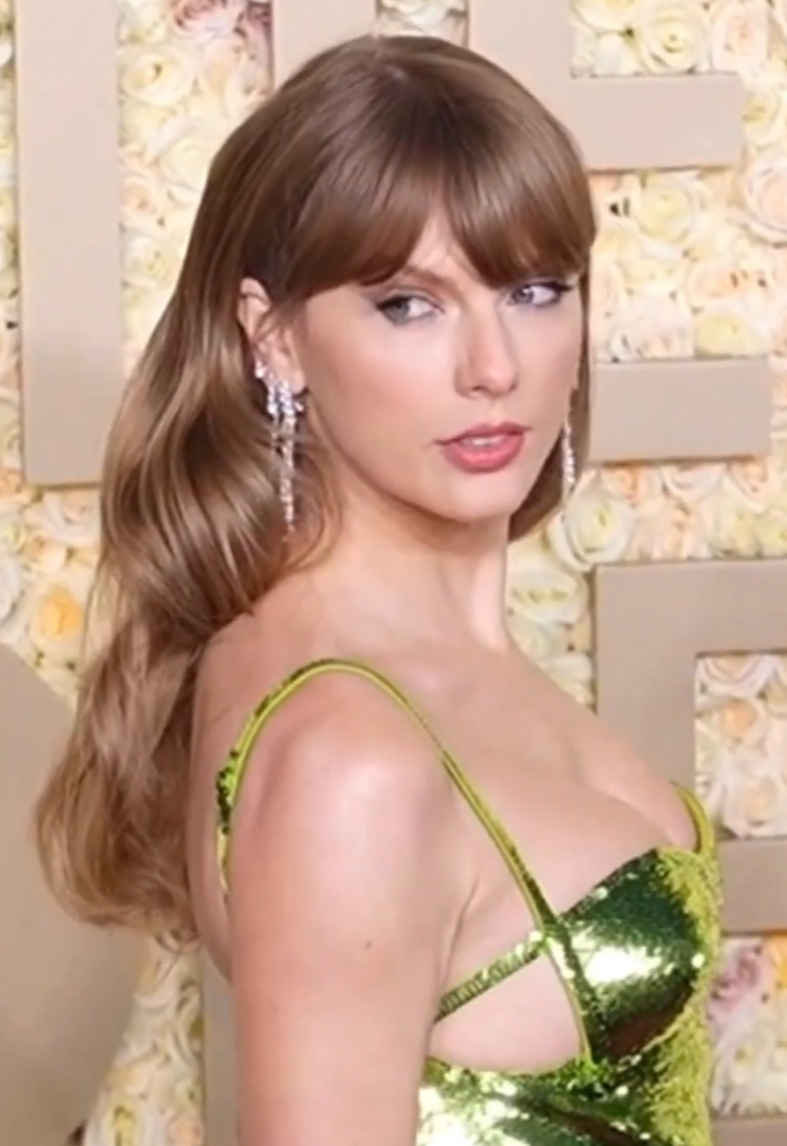
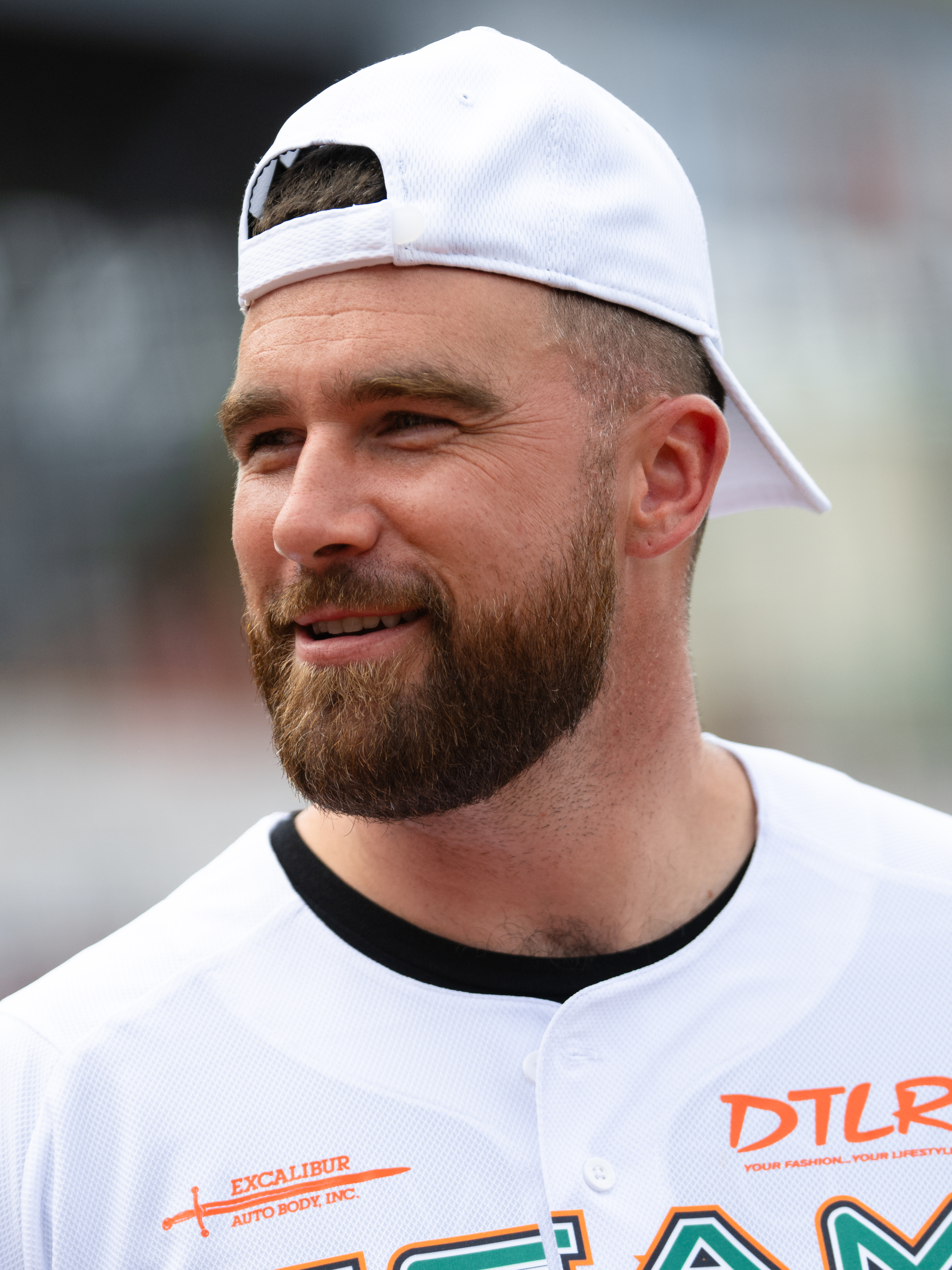
Swift and Kelce in 2024

Taylor Swift (born 1989) is an American singer-songwriter from West Reading, Pennsylvania. She has won 14 Grammy Awards and is the world's wealthiest female musician with an estimated net worth of $2.1 billion. Travis Kelce (born 1989) is an American professional football player from Cleveland Heights, Ohio, and a three-time Super Bowl champion as the tight-end of the Kansas City Chiefs. The two are regarded as influential figures in their respective fields, music and sports, and icons of American popular culture. (Note: Attributed to Time, GQ, and The New York Times.)

In 2023, following a highly publicized courtship, Swift and Kelce began spending time together. By the time Kelce publicly invited Swift to attend his team, the Kansas City Chiefs' home game against the Chicago Bears on September 24, they were already rumored to be a couple. She supported him and his team at multiple football games and public events, which generated a significant increase in viewership and brand value for the NFL and helped increase the popularity of American football. Media outlets dubbed them America's own "royal couple". (Note: Attributed to Yahoo.) Their relationship attracted a parasocial interaction amongst their fans. Emily Yahr wrote in The Washington Post that the U.S. "giddily contemplates" the pairing of Swift and Kelce, which, "for many observers, checks all the right boxes", whereas Andrew Unterbeger of Billboard opined that the pair resulted in "near-100% public approval" because "it just felt right: the All-American athlete dating the All-American pop star." Robert Armstrong of Financial Times described Kelce as a royal consort—"the most important boyfriend in the world; perhaps the most important boyfriend in all of human history."

After two years of dating, Kelce proposed to Swift in early August 2025, at a garden in Lee's Summit, Missouri. They announced their engagement around two weeks later via Instagram, which became one of the platform's most-liked and reposted posts. Before the proposal, the couple recorded an episode of the sports podcast New Heights with Kelce's older brother, Jason. Kelce had his backyard transformed into a "secret garden" during the recording. After they finished, he invited Swift to the backyard and presented her with an elongated cushion, old mine brilliant-cut diamond, bezel-set in a yellow gold band with filigree engravings on the sides. Kelce worked with Kindred Lubeck of Artifex Fine Jewelry to design the ring.

Various public figures reacted to the news. Prominent entertainers who publicly congratulated the couple include Selena Gomez, Gracie Abrams, Cara Delevingne, Sabrina Carpenter, Taylor Lautner, Avril Lavigne, Charlie Puth, Gordon Ramsay, and Reese Witherspoon. U.S. President Donald Trump, who has been a critic of Swift and Kelce individually, wished the couple "a lot of luck" when an interviewer broke the news about their engagement to him at the White House.

== Planning ==
Details about the wedding of Swift and Kelce became a topic of journalistic speculation and commentary following the engagement announcement. (Note: Attributed to The New York Times, ESPN, USA Today, and USA Magazine.) First confirmation of the wedding venue and date came on June 24, 2026, from The New York Times, which reported that Swift had rented Madison Square Garden (MSG), an indoor arena in Manhattan, New York City, for July 2–4. Bryan West of USA Today reported equipment and decorations being moved into the arena. Trucks of food shipments, including chicken, milk, onion rings, and lobsters sourced from Quebec, arrived on July 1. In the days leading up to the wedding, there was speculation that the MSG itself was a decoy to divert attention from the actual wedding somewhere else, such as Swift's Rhode Island residence, but those theories were disproved when the food and decoration deliveries arrived to the arena, followed by a stream of black cars on the wedding day.

"It was kind of cool to live out my childhood dream of being in that venue, the mecca of all sports venues, being able to get married there [...] I can't thank the owners of MSG enough for allowing us to get the opportunity to do that, knowing that we wanted a private event and everything, and it was perfect."

— Kelce, BBC

Swift and Kelce hired Los Angeles-based wedding planner Mark Seed for the event. According to Vogue, he is secretive about his identity, making him a popular choice among celebrities who desire privacy in their wedding preparations. CNN reported that the cost of a luxury wedding at MSG is between US$10 million and 20 million. Forbes estimated the cost of the wedding festivities to be at least $20 million, whereas Time estimated a total expense of $50 million.

=== Public security ===
Mayor Zohran Mamdani said that his administration was prepared to handle public security during all major events that weekend—the 2026 FIFA World Cup, July Fourth, America 250, and Swift's wedding. The New York City Police Department (NYPD) had been briefed about a potential influx of fans gathering around MSG. The security perimeter permit, titled "Special Event at MSG," was approved on July 1 by New York City's permitting office.

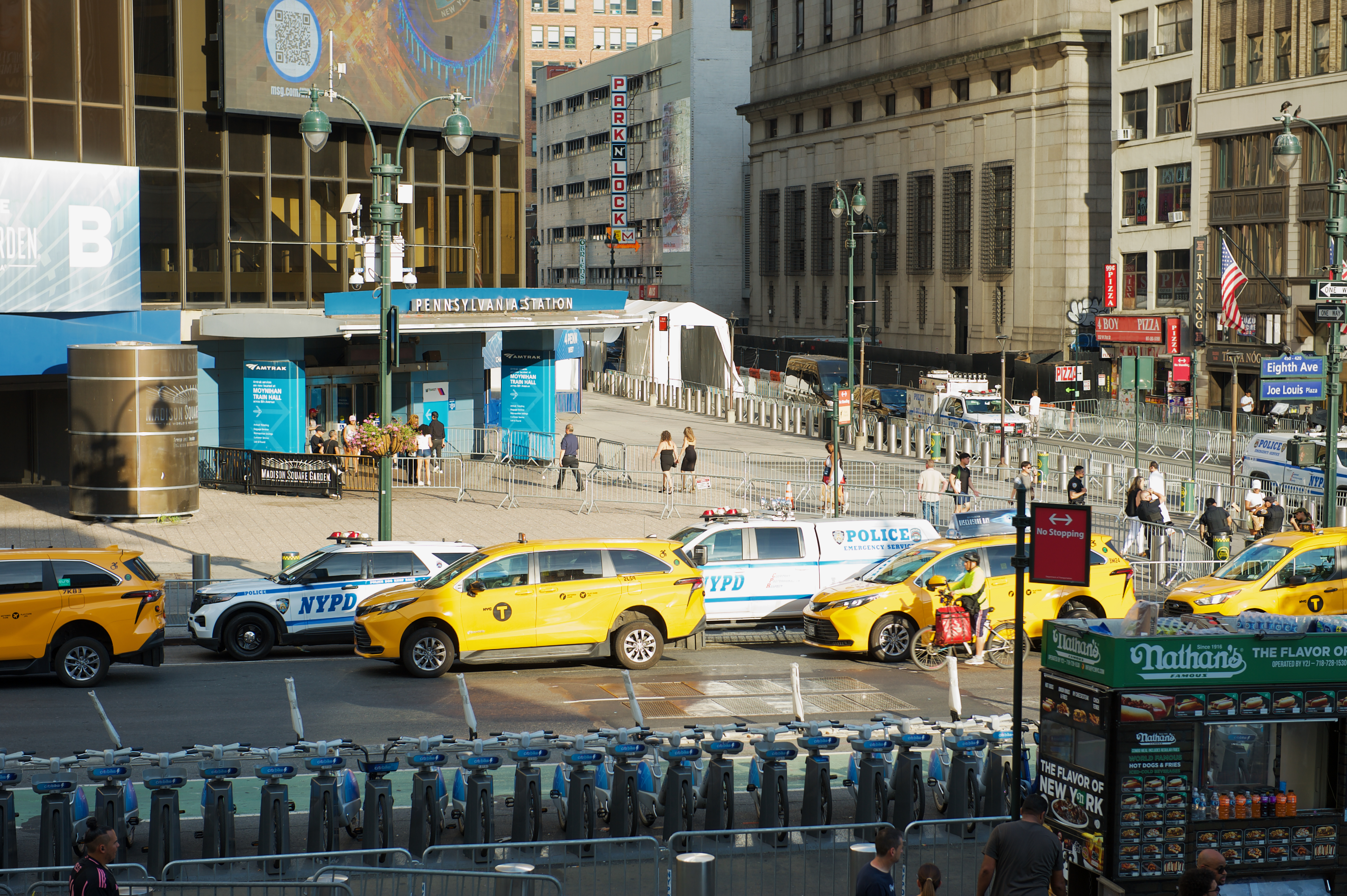
Outside Madison Square Garden, police erected barricades, only letting people enter New York Penn Station.

A large number of police officers gathered inside MSG as part of the event's security detail. A strict no-phone policy was enforced at the wedding events, and portions of 31st and 33rd streets were closed for the duration, with tents and canopies set up to cover arrivals and departures. Seventh Avenue was closed to cars between 30th and 34th streets, while pedestrian access was restricted on the west side of Seventh Avenue between 31st and 34th streets, and on 33rd Street between Seventh and Eighth avenues. Access to Penn Station beneath MSG was also restricted. At the wedding, guests arrived in streams of blacked-out SUVs seen driving through a pop-up tent erected outside the arena to shield their arrival.

According to the gossip column Page Six, NYPD officers stationed around the wedding complained about working extended shifts in extreme heat—some officers cited over 24–30 hours straight without breaks—during one of the hottest stretches of the year. Political commentator Hasan Piker criticized Swift and Kelce, calling their celebration an excessive, "dramatic misuse of public resources", and "a little bit tacky, at best." Charles Trepany of USA Today said that though many celebrated the high-profile wedding, others criticized its extravagance. Trepany highlighted that other luxury celebrity weddings, including those of Jeff Bezos and Lauren Sánchez, and Ankur Jain and Erika Hammond, have "come under the harsh judgment of the internet." Family therapist Erik Anderson opined that many people feel they may never achieve the financial security their parents had, making luxury events a stark reminder of growing inequality. Holly Baxter of The Independent felt that New York City has become "a rich person's playground dressed up as a liveable city" but commented, "the happy couple are the symptom rather than the disease". Joshua Nelken-Zitser of Business Insider said the wedding reminded him of Bezos's wedding party and will be "remembered for generosity or gridlock," depending on whom you ask.

New York reported that "a barrage of people" on the Internet lamented the city's electricity bill and "misspent" taxpayer dollars, but that the New York City locals themselves "carried on with modest enthusiasm tempered with indifference". On July 10, 2026, Mamdani confirmed that Swift and Kelce had "already" paid over US$160,000 to cover police overtime as part of the permit; he added that the permit and fees were finalized days before the wedding.

== Function ==
=== Rehearsal ===
Swift and Kelce arranged a rehearsal dinner on July 2, described as an "intimate" evening affair for 100 guests—couple's closest circle and family—at the Infosys Theater. Attendees were given a bejeweled keepsake for the occasion; they were black velvet boxes etched with the couple's initials intertwined ("T&T"), each containing a large, diamond-adorned champagne flute. The boxes were presented alongside an image of Swift and Kelce's engagement photograph printed on frayed fabric. The dinner was catered by the Italian-American restaurant Sartiano's from The Mercer Hotel. It had a family-style menu that featured meatballs, caviar cannoli, stuffed paccheri, spaghetti arrabiata, and focaccia with whipped ricotta.

=== Ceremony ===
On July 3, guests arrived at the main space for cocktail hour, beginning at 4:30 pm. The arena was transformed to resemble a forest, whereas the seats were covered in white. The ceremony began an hour later and was officiated by the actor and comedian Adam Sandler, a longtime friend of the couple. Mellow romantic songs were played to settle the guests, while violins and a cello were played during the ceremony. Guests' phones were collected in a glass box upon arrival at the wedding.

Swift and Kelce forwent traditional bridesmaids and groomsmen, despite media speculation; instead, Swift's younger brother Austin served as her man of honor, while Kelce's older brother Jason served as his best man. Swift walked down the aisle to an acoustic version of one of her songs. Kelce's nieces—Jason and Kylie Kelce's children—served as flower girls, walking down the little ramp built for them. The couple each delivered a 20-minute wedding vow, reading it from a golden book. Jonathan Thomas, CEO of American Century Investments, said the vows lasted about 30 minutes each, with Kelce followed by Swift; fellow attendee Joe Buck remarked that the vows were well-written, funny, and emotional. Kelce and Swift were pronounced husband and wife at 7:22 pm.

Pink billboards reading "JUST&T MARRIED!" were displayed around MSG moments as soon as the couple were wed. A few moments after the billboards announced the marriage, media outlets reported that sudden and intense winds began blowing through Manhattan, followed by a torrential rainstorm and a rainbow.

=== Reception ===
After the ceremony, the bride's mother Andrea Swift invited everyone into the reception room, where a stage had been set up. Music artists Stevie Nicks, Paul McCartney, Tim McGraw, Ciara, Fergie, Avril Lavigne, Tate McRae, and Ice Spice performed for the newlyweds. McCartney performed "I Want to Hold Your Hand", the 1963 single by the Beatles—his first time doing so since September 1964. Lavigne performed "Sk8er Boi" (2002). Swift and Kelce themselves performed a duet. The Daily Mail claimed that Lena Dunham gave a speech at the event in which she described American football as "straight guys reenacting gay porn".

The wedding was catered by Zero Bond. The food stations served a variety of items including pasta, sushi, steak, burgers, fries, and seafood. Instead of cutting into a traditional wedding cake, a dessert table was arranged featuring around 30 cakes with unique toppers of Swift and Kelce, as well as Pop-Tarts, cookies, Danishes, and other pastries. Large orders of pizzas and cheesesteaks were brought in for guests who stayed late. There were also several bars, and a cocktail menu of three customized drinks inspired by their engagement: "The English Teacher", "The Gym Teacher", and "T&Tequila".

There was no VIP seating or segregation throughout the event. The reception featured numerous games, which guests were invited to play to earn raffle tickets for a chance to win prizes. NBC News reported that the prizes included designer handbags and a 1970 Chevrolet Chevelle. Photos from the wedding have not yet been published, and guests have mostly refused to reveal much detail about the wedding to media outlets. Guests received a custom, embroidered white napkin featuring the "T&T" monogram and beneath it the lyric "So it's gonna be forever..." from Swift's single "Blank Space" (2014). Country singer Brad Paisley described the celebrations as one of the "least pretentious" weddings he had attended.

=== Attire ===
Swift wore a white wedding dress with a long veiled train and Kelce a white tuxedo, designed by Jonathan Anderson, the creative director of Christian Dior. The couple were described as being "in close collaboration" with Anderson on their haute couture ensembles. Swift and Kelce also wore custom-made shoes designed by Christian Louboutin. Swift additionally accented her attire with Cartier jewelry. Vanessa Friedman, chief fashion critic of The New York Times, quoted a Dior spokesman as saying that Dior does not plan to reveal the dress unless "Swift herself posts the first pictures on her Instagram". Friedman also reported that Swift's custom bridal dress was the talk of the Dior couture show in Paris on July 6, 2026, and that it had created public and industry curiosity. Swift's wedding band is a curved ring crafted from yellow gold and dotted halfway around with small diamonds, complementing her larger engagement ring. Kelce wore a similarly designed ring.

== Impact ==
In the week leading up to the wedding, Swift and Kelce donated US$26 million to more than 20 charity organizations in the US, including nine food banks, an animal rescue organization, seven educational programs, and three children's hospitals. Dolly Parton expressed her gratitude to the couple for donating to the children's education program of her Dollywood Foundation. Inspired by Swift and Kelce's donations, Swifties crowdfunded about $17,500 for the Kansas City-based non-profit organization Operation Breakthrough, which supports children and families in poverty. On the other hand, CBS News reported that more than $4.5 million had been wagered by bettors in prediction markets on the wedding venue.

Fans, media outlets, and social circles in New York City, Los Angeles, and Nashville speculated about the guest list. Many of the invitees rearranged their holiday plans to attend the wedding. Swifties gathered outside the MSG to celebrate the wedding. Fans huddled outside the venue throughout the day, with some of them climbing the scaffolding to try to catch a better view of the festivities. New York City's Empire State Building and Kansas City's Union Station were among the buildings lit in special colors in celebration of Swift and Kelce's wedding.

=== Cultural ===
Press and media coverage of Swift and Kelce's nuptials was extensive. Details about the wedding were revealed through guest anecdotes, as photos or videos have not been published. Journalists covering Swift and Kelce's wedding equated it to the U.S. version of a royal wedding. West of USA Today commented that the wedding is "one of the biggest events of the year – if not the decade or century." Forbes called it "the wedding of the decade", while The Guardian hailed it as "the wedding of the century" and a "cultural spectacle" at the heart of New York City. Variety's executive music editor, Jem Aswad, said that the publication, which is typically devoted to Hollywood actors, planned to cover the wedding extensively because of demand from readers. Rolling Stone prepared several articles in anticipation of the wedding day, including a history of major celebrity weddings and a list of Swift's greatest love songs, according to co-editor-in-chief Shirley Halperin.

Various writers commended the venue and event management. Ashlyn Robinette of People said that although Madison Square Garden can be perceived as an unconventional wedding venue, it hosts both "blockbuster concerts and major sporting events" while offering several safety, security, and privacy advantages. According to USA Today columnist Kofi Mframa, the wedding "won't please internet tastemakers, but chicness was never [Swift's] penchant. Hosting a wedding at MSG is Swift remaining faithful to her canon of uncool." Time's Jeffrey Sonnenfeld wrote the wedding was characterized by its "smooth logistical execution, massive yet tasteful staging, and lush gardens that transformed Madison Square Garden into a magical, mystical romantic world". Professors from the University of London, the University of New South Wales, and the University of Edinburgh wrote that it had "hype, intrigue, tight media control and plenty of global attention", comparing it to the institutions of the British monarchy; they praised the wedding's management from an organizational perspective as "a masterclass in institutional control".

Others associated the wedding with an American cultural identity. Kristen Meinzer and Mark Savage of the BBC opined that Swift and Kelce's union is significant as they are from "two important worlds" with regards to pop culture and the American identity, making them one of the most powerful married couples in the US with "huge sway across the music, sport, film, podcast, publishing and television industries." Amanda Hess of The New York Times agreed, dubbing Swift and Kelce's "royal" marriage as a consolidation of their cultural powers on the 250th Independence Day of the U.S. Tyler Forgatt of The New Yorker wrote that with the wedding, Swift's "life caught up to her art" as a culmination of two decades of songs about love and life. Forgatt described their marital union as a merger of "America's two state religions"—pop music and football. According to Elizabeth Vlossak, history professor at Brock University, Swift and Kelce present "a new Americana that the rest of the world hopes for from America."

Some publications predicted that the wedding would drive newfound interest in and appreciation for marriage in the single demographic. Wedding platform TheKnot.com dubbed it the "Swiftication of Weddings", estimating a $1.8 billion increment in wedding-related expenditure in the US and over $400 million outside the US in the following two years. Dave Schilling of The Guardian opined that the wedding was "a momentous event in pop culture history" and felt that it indicates a new, stronger-than-ever appeal for "big" weddings. Parade reported a JB.com survey that ranked the Swift–Kelce nuptials as the most talked-about wedding of the year with 65.9 million media impressions, followed by Zendaya and Tom Holland (27.8 million), and Dua Lipa and Callum Turner (4.91 million).

The complete absence of the wedding's audiovisual media from the Internet has been a subject of media and public fascination. The Times of India said that all alleged "leaks" posted online are AI-generated, visually evident upon closer examination, and unauthenticated. On July 26, 2026, the tabloid Daily Mail shared what it claimed to be digital renderings of the wedding, though unverified by other outlets. When the actress Dakota Johnson, one of Swift's friends, was asked on BBC Radio 1 if the photos will ever be publicized, she replied "No." With all the photos and videos of the wedding and associated events remaining fully private after several months, Alisha Haridasani Gupta of The New York Times said that complete secrecy has become a luxury, departing the from the era when photos "were once sold and published in glossy magazines". Substack author Carson Griffith opined that, "in a culture addicted to oversharing, restraint has become glamorous."

=== Political ===
The Trump administration attempted to troll the wedding. The official White House social media accounts posted images appropriating imagery and lyrics from Swift's career to depict a Trumpist version of American history in forms of "eras", similar to the Eras Tour poster. Sonnenfeld opined that Trump's mockery shows he envies the national attention the wedding received instead of his 250th Anniversary projects. Sonnenfeld contrasted the "Utopian" success and rave reaction to Swift's wedding with the poor reception of Trump's recent "dystopian" ideas and moves.

Maya Georgi of Rolling Stone said the presence of businessman Steven J. Demetriou at the wedding "caused a huge stir". Demetriou is the executive chairman of Amentum Services, which is the sole government contractor of Camp East Montana, the largest immigrant detention site in the country. Demetriou had adopted Kelce's longtime friend Reggie King, who was invited to the wedding, and King allegedly brought along his whole family. Fans criticized Swift and Kelce for allowing "someone with ICE connections" at the wedding, given the couple's Democratic affiliations.

== Guest list ==
Instead of traditional paper invitations, Swift and Kelce opted for watermarked digital invites, with guests receiving a link sent to their phones. Invitations were sent to approximately 1,000 friends and colleagues as well as their spouses or partners in March 2026. Swift had previously stated on The Graham Norton Show in October 2025 that she prefers a large wedding to avoid the stress of deciding on a guest list, jokingly adding that she intends to invite to her wedding anyone she had "ever talked to." Rolling Stone described the list as "athletes to actors, dignitaries to divas, it was a celebrity-filled smorgasbord." According to The Times of India, the guest list "read like a live version of the Met Gala crossed with an NFL awards night."

Guests, vendors, and security personnel signed non-disclosure agreements (NDAs). Attendees stayed in rooms near MSG, including at the Marriott Marquis in Times Square and the Ritz-Carlton Hotel on Central Park South. Celebrity guests did not speak or post about the wedding during or immediately after it; only after few days, many of them started posting photos of themselves on Instagram to confirm that they were at the wedding. Below is a non-exhaustive list of the wedding's celebrity attendees.

=== Family ===
- Austin Swift, bride's brother and the man of honor
- Donna Kelce, groom's mother
- Jason Kelce, former Philadelphia Eagles center, groom's brother and the best man
  - Kylie Kelce, podcaster and groom's sister-in-law

=== Hollywood ===
- Uzo Aduba, actress
- Jessica Alba, actress
- Adam Aron, CEO of AMC Theatres
- Elizabeth Banks, actress and director
- Noah Baumbach and Greta Gerwig, filmmakers
- Kate Berlant, comedian
- Jerrod Carmichael, comedian
- Josh Charles, actor
- Jessica Chastain, actress
- Stephen Colbert, television host
- Toni Collette, actress
- Bradley Cooper, actor
- Tom Cruise, actor
- Charlie Day and Mary Elizabeth Ellis, actors
- Laura Dern, actress
- Lena Dunham, writer
- Jimmy Fallon, television host
- Heidi Gardner, comedian and actress
- Nikki Glaser, comedian
- Donald Glover, actor and singer
- Tom Hanks, actor
- Mariska Hargitay and Peter Hermann, actors
- Ethan Hawke, actor
- Liam Hemsworth, actor
- Marcello Hernández, comedian
- Lynette Howell Taylor, president of the Academy of Motion Picture Arts and Sciences
- Bob Iger, former CEO of Disney
- Dakota Johnson, actress
- Joey King, actress
- Zoë Kravitz, actress
- Jennifer Lawrence, actress
- Seth Meyers, television host
- Julianne Moore, actress
- Niecy Nash, actress
- Conan O'Brien, television host
- Brad Pitt, actor
- Ellen Pompeo, actress
- Danny Ramirez, actor
- Giovanni Ribisi, actor
- Rob Riggle, actor
- Julia Roberts, actress
- Chris Rock, comedian
- Paul Rudd, actor
- Adam Sandler, actor and the wedding officiant
- Adam Scott, actor
- Andrew Scott, actor
- Steven Spielberg, filmmaker
- Ben Stiller, actor
- Emma Stone, actress
- Eric Stonestreet, actor
- Jason Sudeikis, actor
- Anya Taylor-Joy, actress
- Owen Thiele, actor
- Dana Walden, Disney president and chief creative officer
- Reese Witherspoon, actress
- Bowen Yang, comedian and actor

=== Sports ===
- Beau Allen, former Philadelphia Eagles nose tackle
- Erin Andrews, sportscaster
  - Jarret Stoll, former NHL player
- Simone Biles, gymnast
  - Jonathan Owens, Indianapolis Colts safety
- Brock Bowers, Las Vegas Raiders tight end
- Tom Brady, former NFL quarterback
- Jake Briningstool, Chiefs tight end
- Vanessa Bryant, CEO of Granity Studios and widow of NBA player Kobe Bryant
- Joe Buck and Michelle Beisner-Buck, sportcaster and reporter
- Leo Chenal, Washington Commanders linebacker
- Ryan Clark, former NFL safety
- Julian Edelman, former New England Patriots wide receiver
- Clyde Edwards-Helaire, Chiefs running back
- Rich Eisen and Suzy Shuster, sportscasters
- Zach Ertz and Julie Ertz, NFL tight end and former soccer player
- Ryan Fitzpatrick, former NFL quarterback
- Mike Gesicki, Cincinnati Bengals tight end
- Tony Gonzalez, former NFL tight end
- Roger Goodell, NFL commissioner
- Wayne Gretzky, former NHL player
- Rob Gronkowski, former NFL tight end
- Mecole Hardman, Chiefs wide receiver
- Creed Humphrey, Chiefs lineman
- Clark Hunt, Chiefs chairman and CEO
- Kareem Hunt, NFL running back
- Chris Jones, Chiefs defensive tackle
- Kyle Juszczyk, San Francisco 49ers fullback
- George Karlaftis, Chiefs defensive end
- George Kittle, San Francisco 49ers tight end
- Cooper Kupp, Seattle Seahawks wide receiver
- Patrick Mahomes, Chiefs quarterback
  - Brittany Mahomes, co-owner of the Kansas City Current
- Sean Malto, professional skateboarder
- Peyton Manning, former NFL quarterback
- Baker Mayfield, Tampa Bay Buccaneers quarterback
- Pat McAfee, sports commentator
- Trent McDuffie, Rams cornerback
- Alex Morgan, former soccer player
- Greg Olsen, former tight end
- Isiah Pacheco, Detroit Lions running back
- Chandler Parsons, former basketball player
- Micah Parsons, Green Bay Packers linebacker
- Andy Reid, Chiefs head coach
- Khalen Saunders, Jacksonville Jaguars defensive tackle
- Mitchell Schwartz, former NFL offensive tackle
- Richard Sherman, former NFL cornerback
- Alex Smith, former quarterback
- Stephen A. Smith, sportscaster
- JuJu Smith-Schuster, New York Giants wide receiver
- Jack Sock, pickleball player
- Matthew Stafford, Los Angeles Rams quarterback
- Michael Strahan, television host and former New York Giants defensive end
- Justin Thomas, golfer
- Charissa Thompson, sportscaster
- Drue Tranquill, Chiefs linebacker
- Ross Travis, former Chiefs tight end
- Mike Vrabel, New England Patriots head coach and former NFL linebacker
- Abby Wambach, former soccer player
- Tre Watson, Chiefs tight end
- Andrew Whitworth, former NFL tackle
- Jared Wiley, Chiefs tight end
- Russell Wilson, former NFL quarterback
- Derek Wolfe, former NFL defensive tackle

=== U.S. music scene ===
- Gracie Abrams, singer
- Jack Antonoff, musician and producer
- Kelsea Ballerini, singer
- Beck, singer
- Benson Boone, singer
- Kane Brown, singer
- Camila Cabello, singer
- Sabrina Carpenter, singer
- Chris Carrabba, singer
- The Chainsmokers, electronic dance music duo
- The Chicks, country band
- Ciara, singer
- Lucy Dacus, singer
- Aaron Dessner, musician and producer
- Fergie, singer
- Selena Gomez and Benny Blanco, musicians
- Lucian Grainge, chairman of Universal Music Group
- Haim, rock band
- Ice Spice, rapper
- Joseph Kahn, music video director
- Kesha, singer
- King Princess, singer
- Hayley Kiyoko, actress and singer
- Miranda Lambert, singer
- Avril Lavigne, singer
- Hillary Lindsey, singer
- Monte and Avery Lipman, founders of Republic Records
- Little Big Town, country band
- Joel Little, musician and producer
- Jennifer Lopez, singer and actress
- Max Martin and Shellback, producer duo
- Aimee Mayo, songwriter
- Tim McGraw and Faith Hill, singers
- Lori McKenna, singer
- Tate McRae, singer
- MGK, rapper
- Pat Monahan, singer
- Maren Morris, singer
- Muna, indie band
- Nelly and Ashanti, musicians
- Stevie Nicks, singer
- Brad Paisley, singer
  - Kimberly Williams-Paisley, actress
- Joe Don Rooney, musician
- Liz Rose, songwriter
- Shaboozey, singer
- Sombr, singer
- St. Vincent, singer
- Chris Stapleton, singer
- Sugarland, country music duo
- Troy Tomlinson, CEO of Universal Music Publishing Group
- Pete Wentz, musician
- Hayley Williams, singer

=== United Kingdom ===
- Sacha Baron Cohen, actor
- Beabadoobee, singer
- Pattie Boyd, model and photographer
- Millie Bobby Brown, actress
- Emma Bunton, singer
- Cara Delevingne, model and actress
- Phoebe Dynevor, actress
- Karen Elson, model and singer
- Ellie Goulding, singer
- Hugh Grant, actor
- Griff, singer
- Greg James, radio presenter
  - Bella Mackie, journalist
- Chris Lake, DJ
- Dua Lipa, singer
  - Callum Turner, actor
- Paul McCartney, singer
- Martin McDonagh, filmmaker
- Jamie Oliver, chef and television personality
- Ed Sheeran, singer
- Zadie Smith, novelist
- Phoebe Waller-Bridge, actress and writer
- Suki Waterhouse, actress and singer

=== Other attendees ===
- Tommy Alter, podcaster
- Vinnie Brand, stand-up comedian
- Barbara Corcoran, founder of Corcoran Group
- Cindy Crawford, model
  - Kaia Gerber, model
- Steve Demetriou, Ohio state representative
- Glennon Doyle, author
- Ronan Farrow, journalist and lawyer
- Gigi and Bella Hadid, models
- Jenny Han, author
- Tommy Hilfiger and Dee Ocleppo, fashion designers
- Karlie Kloss, model and CEO of I-D
  - Joshua Kushner, businessman
- Graham Norton, television host
- Tree Paine, Swift's publicist
- Antoni Porowski, television cook and model
- Robin Roberts, co-anchor of Good Morning America
- Alison Roman, chef and food writer
- Scott Sartiano, restaurateur
- George Stephanopoulos, broadcaster and former US government official
- Dita Von Teese, vedette and actress
- All members of The Agency, Swift's live band since 2007, and The Starlights, her backing vocalists, as well as all the dancers from the Eras Tour, including Amanda Balen, Jan Ravnik, and Kameron Saunders

=== Absences ===
- Charles Barkley, basketball player – declined invitation
- Zach Collaros, football quarterback – scheduling conflict; game with the Winnipeg Blue Bombers of the Canadian Football League
- Lana Del Rey, singer – hosted a birthday party for a friend
- Jaime King, actress and model – childcare; has a son "too young" for the occasion
- Jacknife Lee, music producer – inadvertently deleted the invitation
- Robert Pattinson, actor and Waterhouse's fiancé – scheduling conflict; filming and promotional commitments in the UK
- Margaret Qualley, actress – separated from Antonoff
- Ryan Seacrest, television host – scheduling conflict; hosted an Independence Day special
- Harry Styles, singer and Kravitz's fiancé – scheduling conflict; due to his Together, Together tour
- James Taylor, singer – scheduling conflict; an Independence Day performance in Tanglewood
- Shania Twain, singer – scheduling conflict; opening act for Styles's tour

== See also ==
- Public image of Taylor Swift
- Arrowhead Stadium, Kansas City stadium that hosted Swift's Eras Tour and the home of Kelce's NFL team—also the venue of the couple's first official date
- Wedding of Prince Harry and Meghan Markle, which received a similar press coverage
