= Sartiano's (restaurant) =

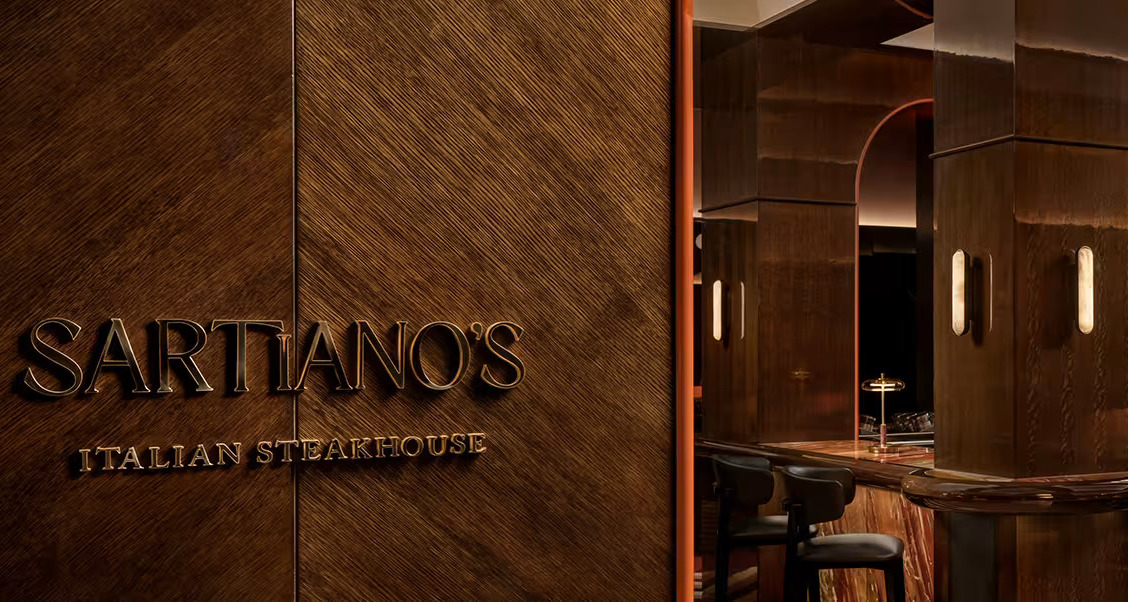
- The entrance to Sartiano's at Wynn Las Vegas

Restaurant information
- Established: 2023
- Head chef: Alfred Portale
- Food type: Italian
- Location: Mercer Hotel, New York
- Coordinates: 40.7248°N 73.9986°W
- Other locations: Las Vegas, Nevada
- Website: www.wynnlasvegas.com/dining/fine-dining/sartianos

Sartiano's is an Italian-American restaurant with locations in SoHo New York, and within Wynn Las Vegas on the Las Vegas Strip. The New York location opened in 2023 and is located within the Mercer Hotel. The Las Vegas location, titled as "Sartiano's Italian Steakhouse", opened in Wynn in March 2026, adjacent to Zero Bond.

== History ==
The restaurant was founded by Scott Sartiano based on his family's Neapolitan traditions; he is of Italian descent, and both of his parents are from Brooklyn. (Sub)Mercer, the subterranean nightclub beneath Sartiano's, was also reopened in New York by Sartiano.

The restaurant's Las Vegas design, conceived by Wynn Design & Development, re-imagines mid-century modernism with an arched ceiling and distinctive terrazzo floor.

The menu at Sartiano's at The Mercer focuses on "lighter takes on Italian American dishes which includes seasonal ingredients and plating that evokes fine dining." Each location serves similar dishes, but the Wynn also offers "new highlights" not available in New York, such as a 40-ounce wagyu porterhouse steak.

== Cuisine ==
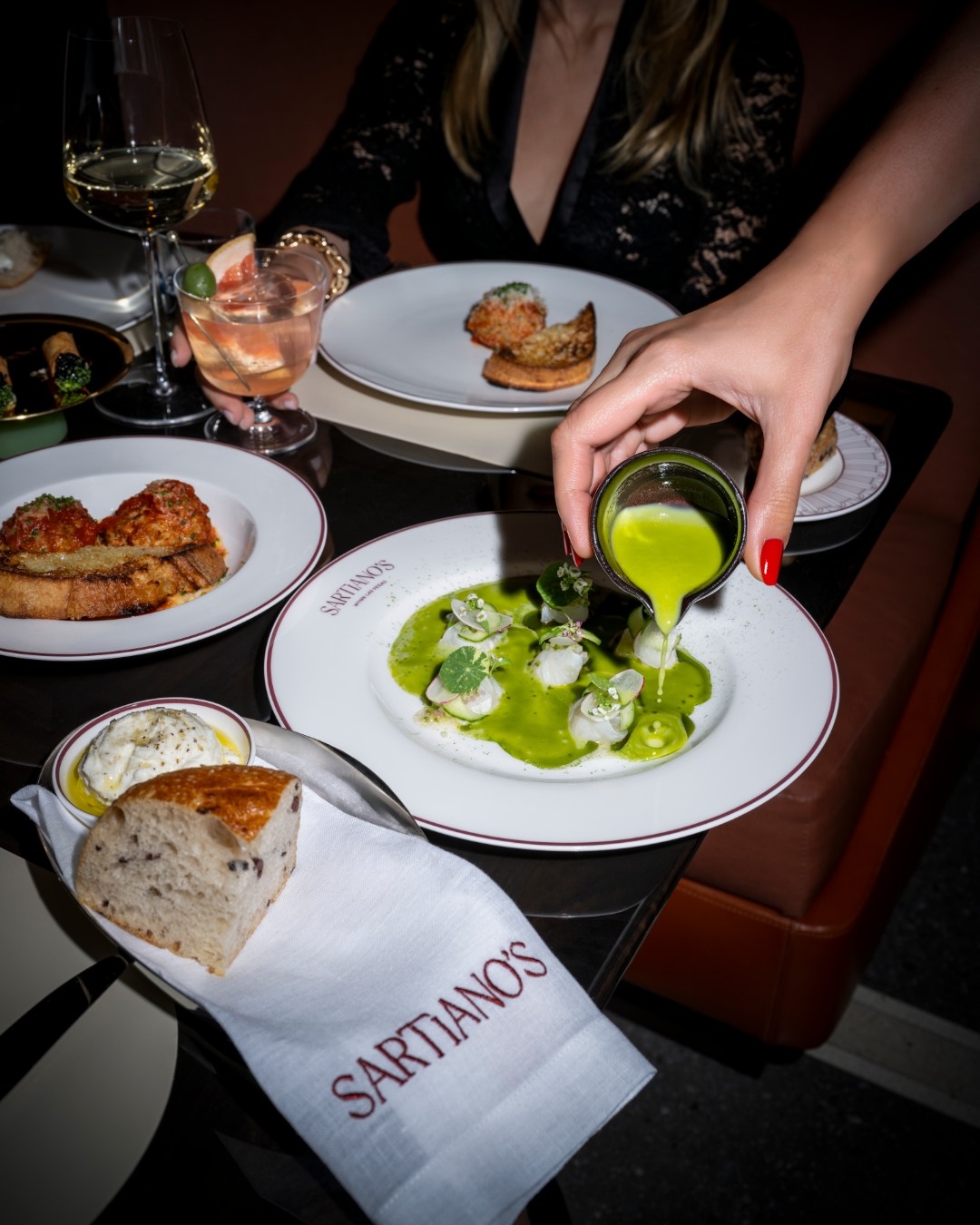
Fluke crudo served at Sartiano's at Wynn Las Vegas

Three-time James Beard Award winner Alfred Portale is culinary director of both locations. In Las Vegas, daily operations will be overseen by Las Vegas native executive chef Michael Rubinstein, formerly of Momofuku.

The cocktail program is overseen by Mariena Mercer Boarini, Master Mixologist for Wynn Resorts and a 2026 James Beard Award semifinalist. She described the program as "rooted in Italian culture—celebrating food, drink, conversation and connection;" she described her intent to be "invigorating, refined and captivating." The focus is on classics, interpreted through ingredients with Italian influences.

In New York City, the restaurant is helmed by Executive Chef Chris Eby. The beverage program, led by Bond Hospitality's Beverage Director Adam Baca, blends Italian inspiration with the "vibrant energy of New York City, featuring imaginative cocktails and non-alcoholic options."

== Reception ==
Vogue noted both the cuisine and location made the original NYC location "are reasons enough to visit Sartiano's. But, no doubt, a magnetic draw will also be the crowd… Sartiano's is a worthy steward of The Mercer—and SoHo's—stylish reputation."

The Las Vegas Review Journal called the Wynn location "one of the biggest openings" in the city and described the flank steak as "expertly butchered, tender but never flabby, richly flavored without too much fat, the seasoning so adroit it seems almost an inherent quality of the meat itself, not an external enhancement."
