= Maximilian Jencquel =

German and French designer

Maximilian Jencquel is a Venezuelan-born, German and French designer. His notable projects include his private residences in Ubud, Bali, Indonesia.

== Early life and education ==
Johann Maximilian Jencquel was born in Caracas, Venezuela.

Encouraged to go into business alongside his father, Jencquel enrolled in business school at Lehigh University in Pennsylvania. After some time, he found that he was losing interest in business and instead enrolled in the University's art department.

After graduating from Lehigh with a Bachelor of Arts in Fine Arts in the Summer of 2000, Jencquel moved to Paris. He enrolled at the ESAG Penninghen, formerly the Académie Julian. Here, he honed his drawing skills over two years. He then went on to study Interior Architecture at the same academy, and graduated in 2005 with a Master’s in Interior Architecture.

Jencquel's thesis project, Cabuya, was a bamboo house designed to be an alternative to contemporary construction techniques harmful to the environment. It was awarded the best student project with the Janus de l'Etudiant. Cabuya exhibited in Nantes at the Biennale internationale du design de Saint-Étienne in Saint-Etienne and the European Ways of Life design show.

== Career ==
Jencquel was hired in April 2006 at Christian Liaigre's design studio in Paris.

He assisted in designing homes, and learned how to design furniture. Some key projects Jencquel was involved with while under the supervision of Liaigre himself and a team of senior designers are: a modern private residence in the city of Athens, a restaurant in Paris (La Societe), and Liaigre's apartment in Paris.

During his time at Liaigre, the company was sold to Edmund Rothschild Capital Partners, prompting many changes to the design studio.

Jencquel left Liaigre in July 2010 to move to the island of Bali with his girlfriend (now wife), Stefanie Gasser.

=== Studio Jencquel ===
Jencquel traveled to Indonesia several times while still employed in Europe.

In July 2010, Jencquel abandoned his professional career and settled in Ubud, Bali—Indonesia’s artistic and cultural capital.

He established Studio Jencquel, specializing in architecture, interior design, landscape and garden design, and furniture design, in Ubud in 2011.

In 2013, Jencquel started to construct his own home with the aid of a group of local carpenters in a style influenced by regional vernacular architecture and his own contemporary sense of design. The outcome was Rumah Hujan, built using reclaimed wood from an old bridge in Borneo. Other Bali residents began seeking his help in building their new homes.

=== Gallery ===
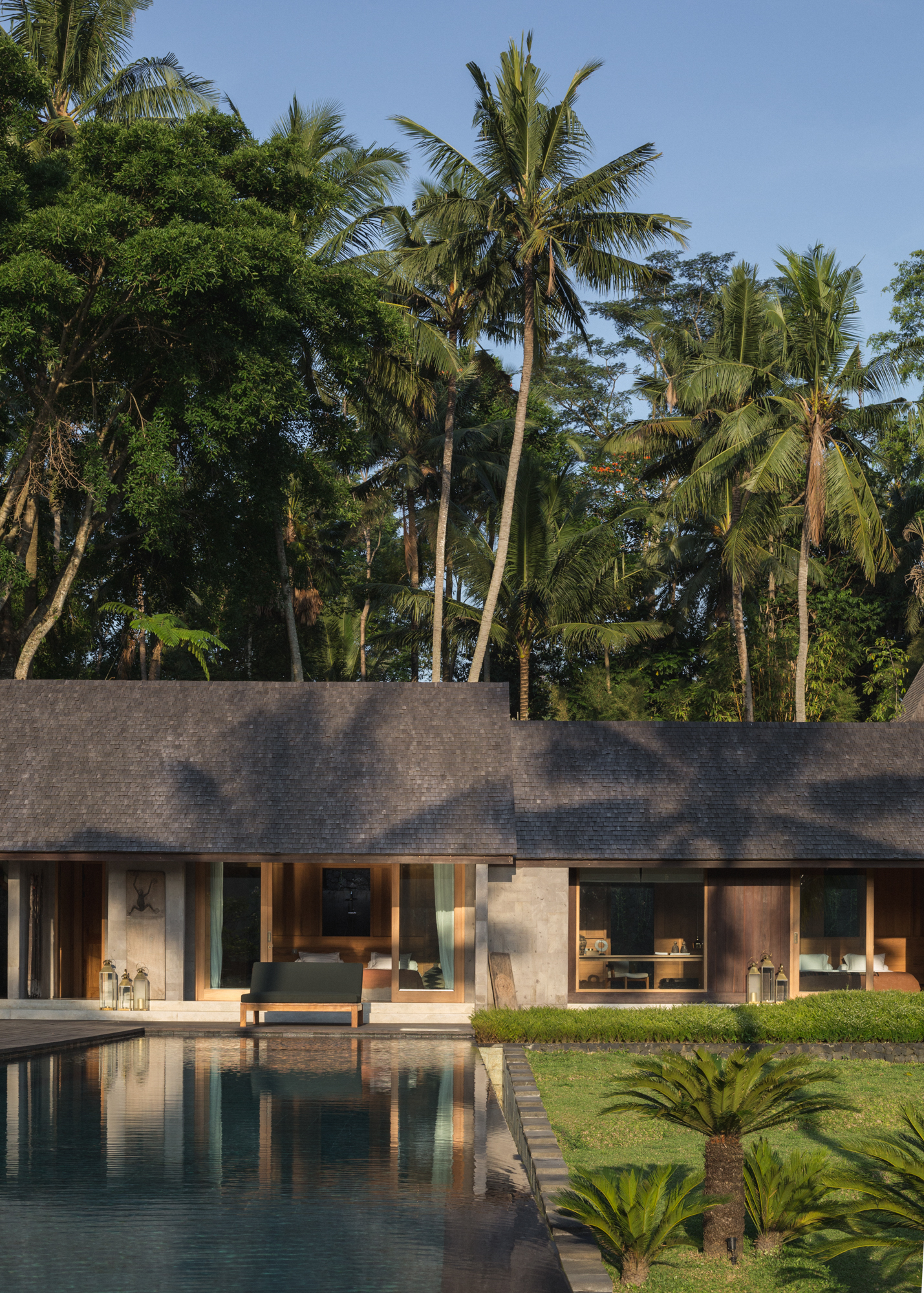
UMAH HATI - EXTERIORS

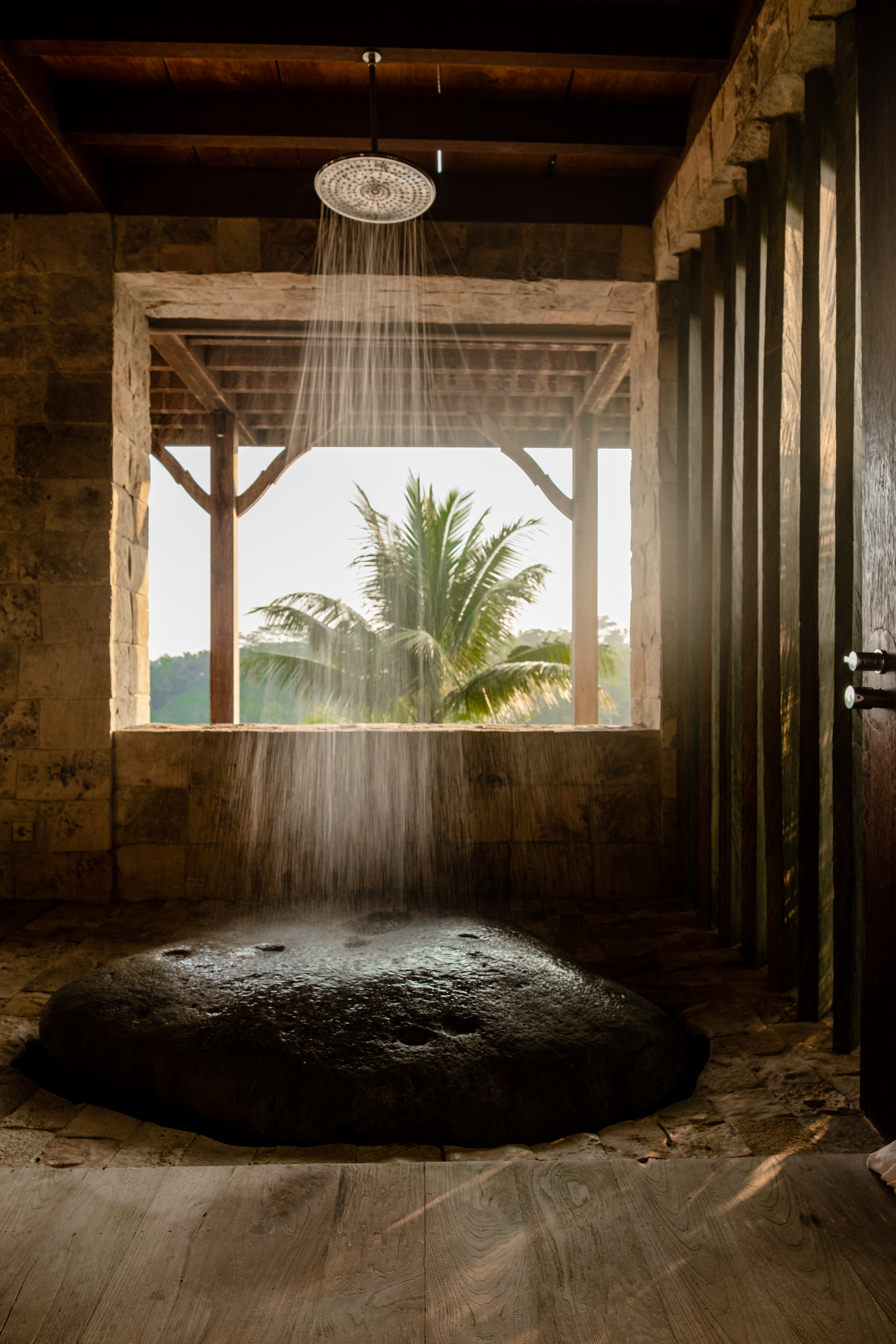

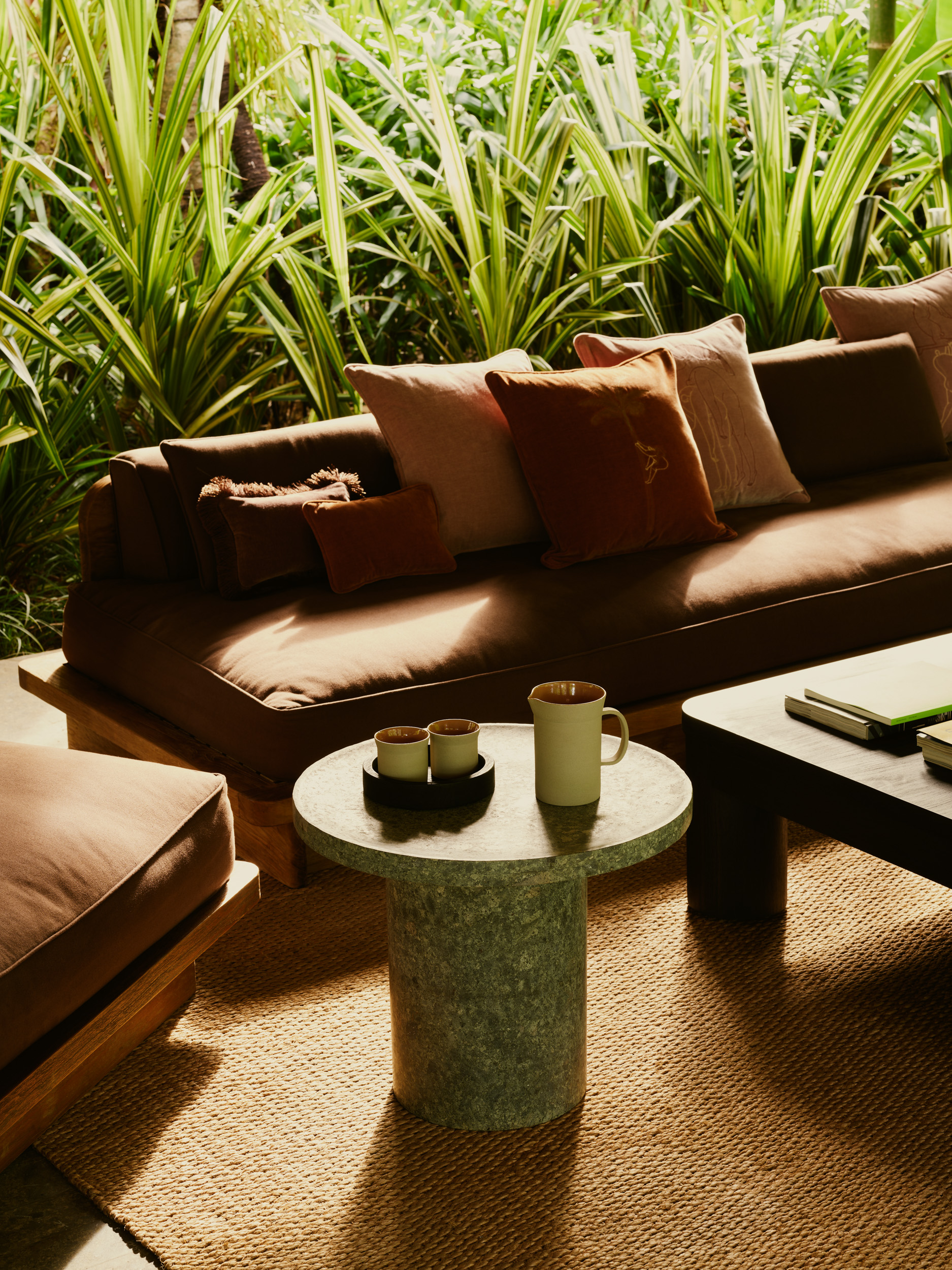
Lost-Lindenberg

== Furniture design ==
At the Lost Lindenberg Hotel in Bali, Studio Jencquel designed the furniture, lighting, tableware, and accessories.

=== Gallery ===
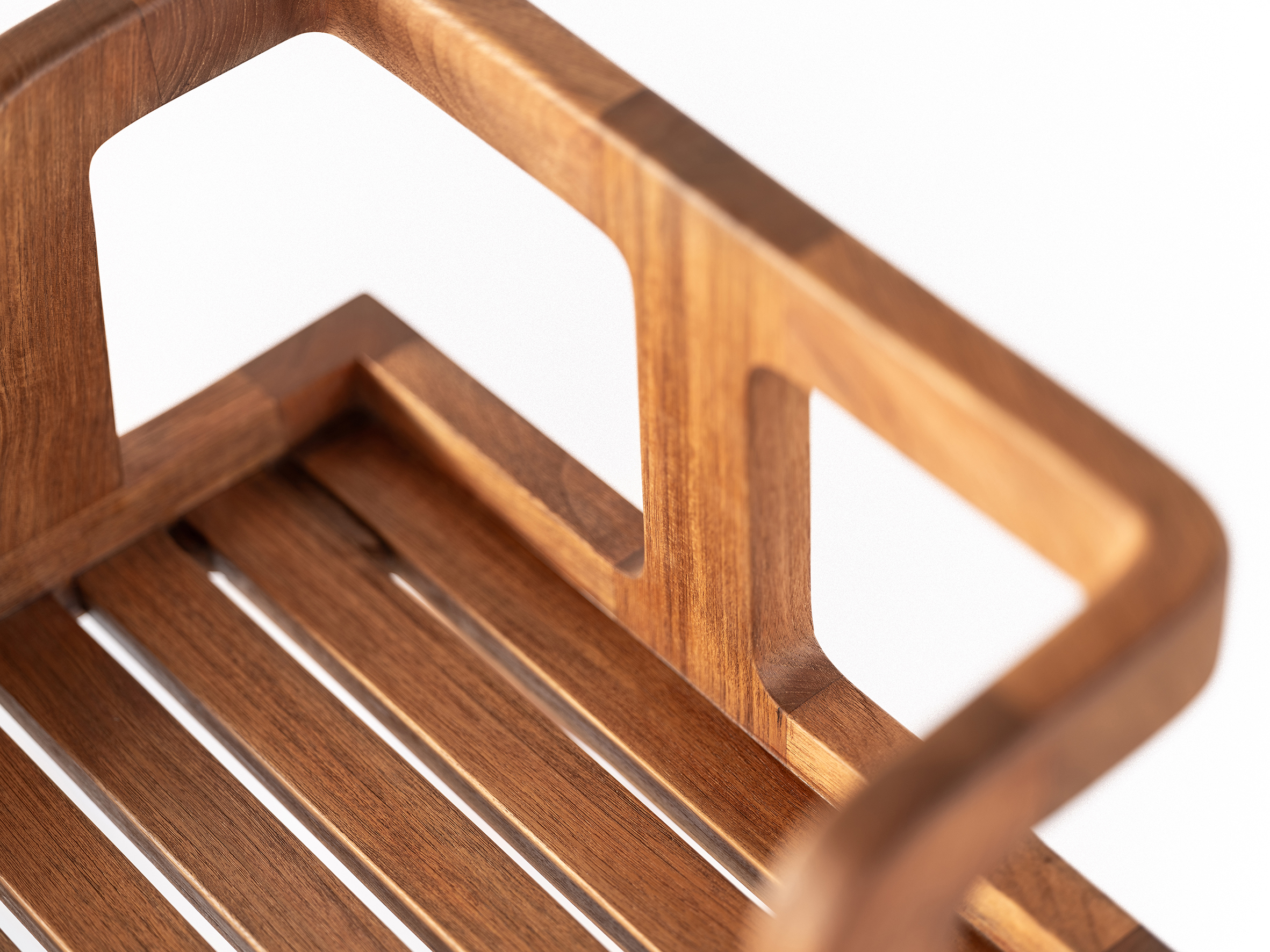
Angostura Detail by Maximilian Jencquel

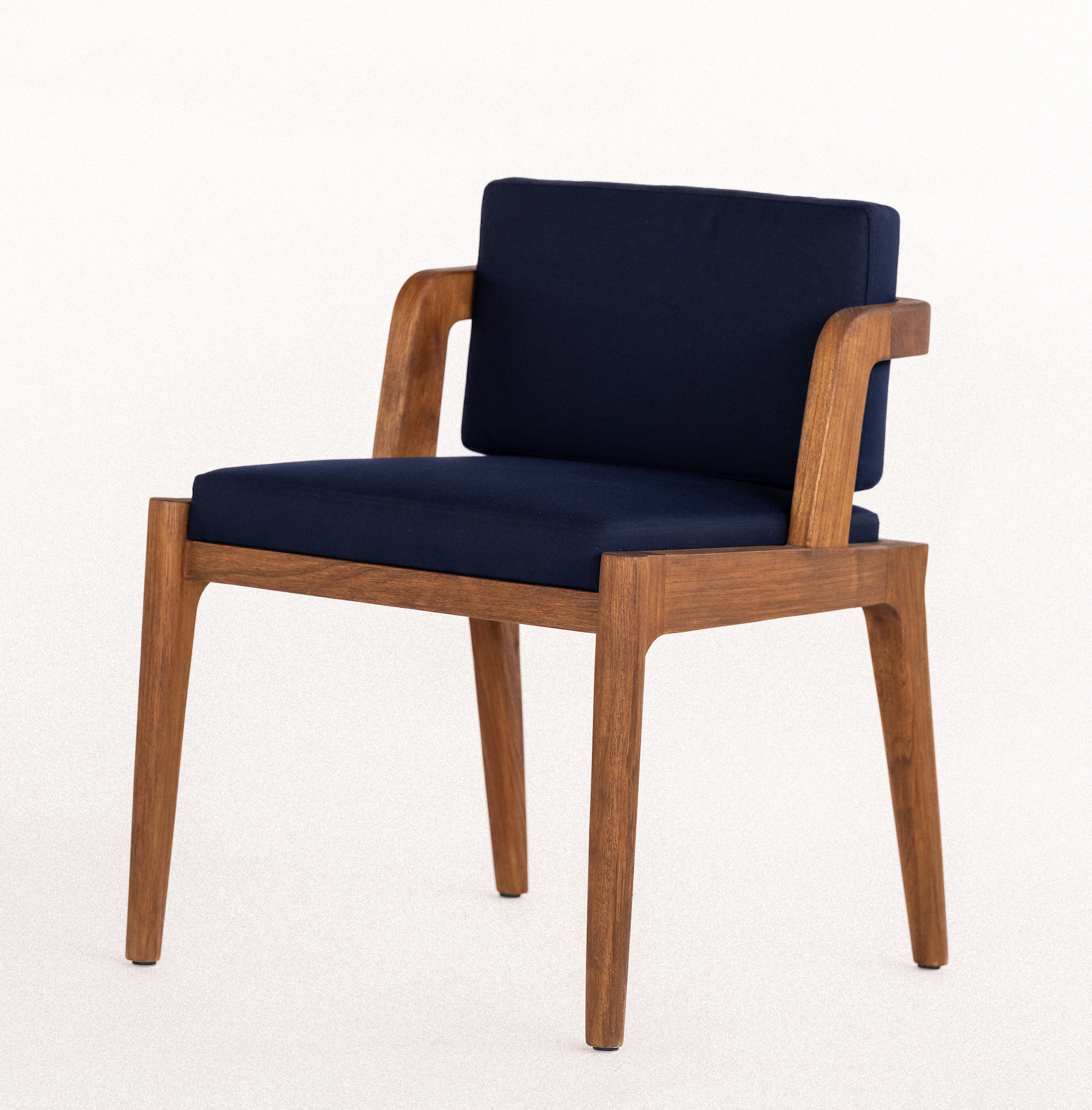
AngosturaChair designed by Maximilian Jencquel

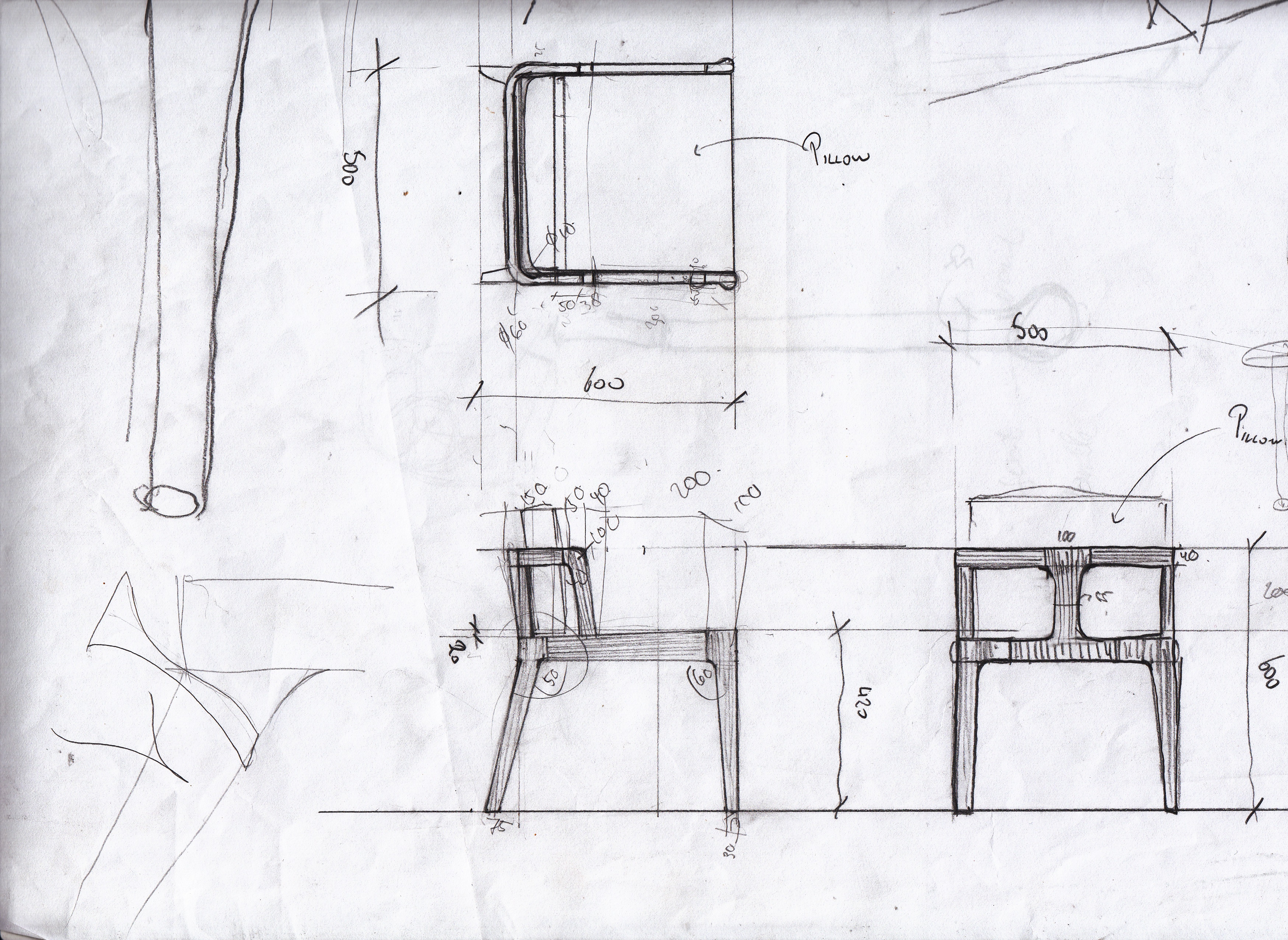
Angostura Chair by Maximilian Jencquel, designed 2012

== Personal life ==
Jencquel settled in Bali in 2010 with his now-wife Stefanie Gasser, and began to develop Studio Jencquel. They have two sons.

== Notable works ==
- Umah Hati
- Rumah Fajar
- Rumah Purnama
- Lost Lindenberg
- Rumah Hujan
