= Gotham Bar and Grill =

New American restaurant in New York City

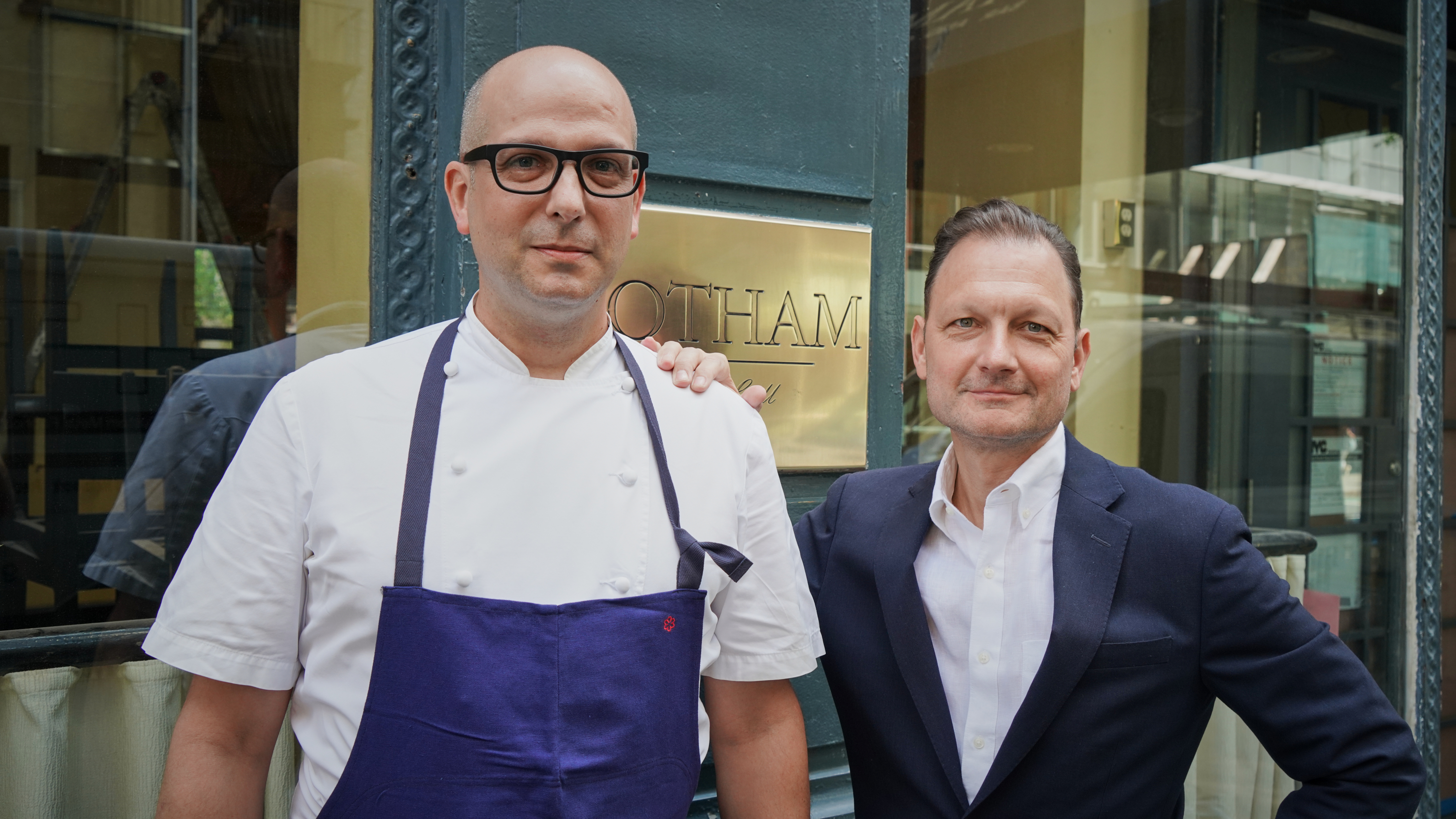
- Paprocki with Bret Csencsitz
- Interactive map of Gotham Bar and Grill

Restaurant information
- Established: 1984
- Closed: November 22, 2024
- Owner: Bret Csencsitz
- Chef: Ron Paprocki
- Food type: New American
- Dress code: Business, dressy, and casual chic
- Location: 12 East 12th Street, Greenwich Village, Manhattan, New York, United States
- Coordinates: 40.7343°N 73.9940°W
- Website: www.gothambarandgrill.com

Gotham Bar and Grill was a New American restaurant located at 12 East 12th Street (between Fifth Avenue and University Place), in Greenwich Village in Manhattan, in New York City. It opened in 1984. It closed in 2020 due to the COVID-19 pandemic, and re-opened in November 2021.

== History ==
The restaurant was opened by Jerry Kretchmer, Jeff Bliss, Rick and Robert Rathe and featured the American chef Alfred Portale. Portale was influenced by the New American cuisine movement from California in the 1980s and 1990s, notably from Alice Waters and Jeremiah Tower of Chez Panisse. In 2019 Portale left Gotham to found his eponymous restaurant on 18th Street. Victoria Blamey took over the kitchen, and the restaurant was awarded 3 Stars for her inventive cuisine. Chef Ron Paprocki reopened Gotham as Executive Chef in November 2021 with a renovated dining room and a new menu. Paprocki was formerly the restaurants Pastry Chef. Paprocki is now the restaurant's third chef after the arrival of Chef Portale in 1985.

After Gotham's closing in March 2020, TimeOut wrote about the restaurant that "it consistently garnered rave reviews, but it was a perhaps a confluence of factors—the trend toward more casual dining, a shift in ownership and the current crisis—that led to the restaurant’s demise."

In June 2024, Gotham temporarily closed its doors again after being victimized in a $45,000 cyberscam, with plans to possibly reopen by the end of summer 2024. In July 2024, Gotham filed for Chapter 11 bankruptcy protection. Gotham closed its doors permanently on November 22, 2024.

== Menu ==
The menu consists of seasonal-inspired selections such as Elyssian Fields-roasted loin of lamb, Niman Ranch 40 Day Dry Aged Strip Steak, Roasted Celeriac with Vegan Bordelaise and Black Truffles, and Handmade Cavatelli. The modern American menu changes seasonally.

== Restaurant ==
The modern, expansive restaurant was chic, located in the multi-level loft space of a former warehouse, with high soaring ceilings, tall floor-to-ceiling windows, and pieces of parachute cloth billowing around its chandeliers. The restaurant's art collection had its own curator. The restaurant served over 400 diners daily as of 2009.

== Reviews ==
In 1993, restaurant critic Gael Greene wrote that it was her favorite restaurant. Bryan Miller of The New York Times gave it three stars in 1985, Molly O’Neill of the Times gave it three stars in 1993, Ruth Reichl of the Times gave it three stars in 1996, and Sam Sifton of the Times awarded it three stars in 2011.

In 2013, Zagats gave it a food rating of 28, the second-highest food rating in Greenwich Village.

== See also ==
- List of New American restaurants
