= Zero Bond =

Members-only social club

Zero Bond is a private membership club founded in New York City in October 2020. A second location was opened at Wynn Las Vegas in 2026. The clubs have private dining, meeting and event spaces, and ban photography.

== History ==
The first Zero Bond was opened by Scott Sartiano, in October 2020, at 0 Bond Street in Manhattan, a former Brooks Brothers factory at Bond and Broadway. The 20,000 square-foot, multi-floor NoHo interior was designed by Bill Sofield, retaining the Victorian Gothic structure's oversized, arched windows, open-beam ceilings, and exposed red brick walls, built in 1874.

Membership to the private club is by application. Facilities include a fingerprint-accessed private founding members lounge, restaurants, meeting rooms, a screening room, lounges, a cafe, a roof deck, and themed events.

The private membership club is frequented by celebrities, including Taylor Swift, Baz Luhrmann, and Tom Brady A segment of Late Night with Seth Meyers, hosting Lorde, was recorded at Zero Bond in 2021. The same year, future New York Mayor Eric Adams' post-election party was held there. The closing scene of the 2023 finale of Succession, with Kieran Culkin, was also filmed at Zero Bond.

In 2024, the company met strong resistance from some East Hampton locals when it negotiated to lease an historic inn for a seasonal outpost of Zero Bond. Since May 2025, guests of The Mercer Hotel in SoHo, where Sartiano is a partner, receive access to Zero Bond during stays.

Gallery art collected in partnership with the local Noho Collective, and curated by Sophie Cohen, includes pieces by Warhol, Haring, Miró, Chagall, Modigliani, Renoir, Wyeth, and Mapplethorpe, as well as an art book library.

A second members-only club opened on March 10, 2026, at Wynn Las Vegas, in a 15,000 square foot villa next to the 18th hole of the golf course, accessed separately from the casino. Live performances marked the opening, with an array of celebrities in attendance. The club features a sculpture garden, wine lockers, a private valet, and member access to Zero Bond in New York. Dining includes The Fairway Grill.
