= Butter Restaurant =

Butter
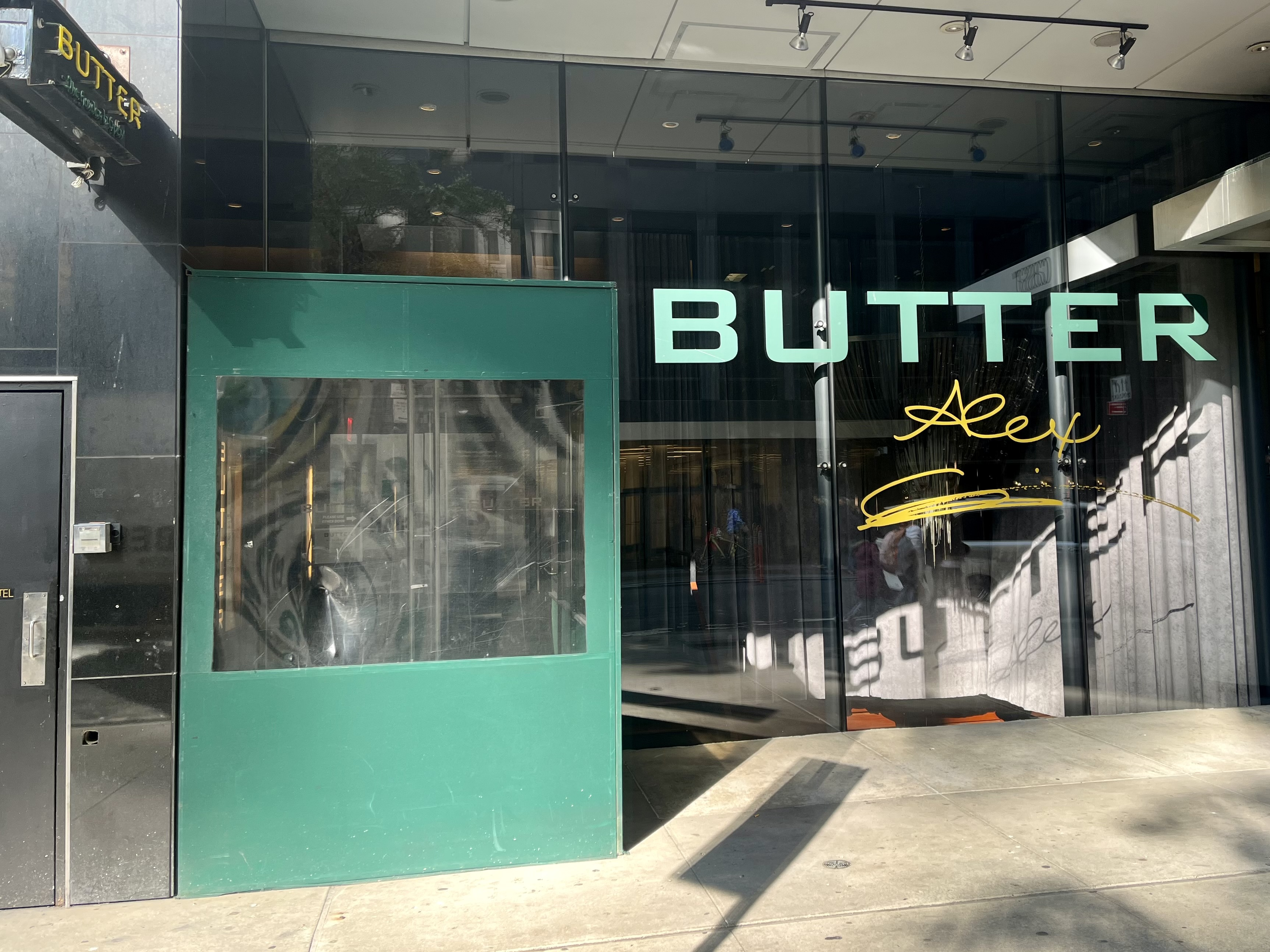
- Butter in November 2023
- Interactive map of Butter

Restaurant information
- Established: 2013
- Location: 70 West 45th Street, New York City, New York, United States
- Coordinates: 40°45′23″N 73°58′56″W

Butter is a restaurant owned by Alex Guarnaschelli and is located in Midtown Manhattan. Opened in 2002, it was originally located on Lafayette Street. The Midtown location opened in November 2013.

The original location, owned by Richie Akiva and Scott Sartiano, was considered a nightlife hotspot.

The restaurant has three seating areas. The private dining room seats 20, 60 sit in the garden, and 175 in the main dining room.
