= Scott Sartiano =

American businessman

- Born: October 31, 1974 (age 51); Pittsburgh, Pennsylvania, United States
- Education: Spring Valley High School
- Alma mater: Columbia University (BA)
- Occupations: Restaurateur; businessperson
- Organization: Bond Hospitality
- Board member of: Metropolitan Museum of Art
- Spouse: Allie Rizzo (m. 2014)

Scott Sartiano (born October 31, 1974) is an American restaurateur and businessperson involved in hospitality. He is known for founding Zero Bond, a private Manhattan social club, in 2020, as well as the restaurant Sartiano's in The Mercer Hotel in 2023. Overall he operates seven venues in New York and Boston through his company Bond Hospitality. Early in his career he founded or co-founded a number of New York nightclubs and restaurants, including Spa, 1Oak, Butter, The Darby, and the Broken Coconut. Sartiano is a member of the board of trustees for the Metropolitan Museum of Art.

== Early life and education ==
Born in 1974 in Pittsburgh, Pennsylvania, Scott Sartiano grew up in Columbia, South Carolina. He also spent time in North Carolina. He is of Italian descent. Both of his parents are from Brooklyn, and his father is a doctor. In 1992 Sartiano was recruited by Columbia University to play tennis, although he was forced to sit out from the sport as a senior after breaking his wrist. He graduated from Columbia in 1997 with a degree in political science.

== Career ==
=== 2000-2019 ===
After graduating, Sartiano considered going into writing or politics. A friend recommended he work as a nightclub promoter for extra cash, and he began working at the club Life in Greenwich Village, as well as other clubs in Manhattan. He and Richie Akiva opened Spa, a dance club near Union Square, in 2000. Sartiano served as executive director. He and Akiva also co-founded The Butter Group in 2000, and in May 2002 they opened Butter Restaurant. Located on Lafayette Street, Butter was a fine dining restaurant with a DJ booth and chef Alex Guarnaschelli handling food.

In 2007, Sartiano co-founded 1Oak, a 250-person nightclub in Chelsea that proved popular with celebrities. In November 2010, he co-founded the supper club-themed restaurant The Darby on 14th Street, also with chef Alex Guarnaschelli. Sartiano began living in West Hollywood in 2014, and by the start of 2015, he was involved in 1Oak locations in Los Angeles, New York, Las Vegas, Southampton and Mexico City. In 2015 he decided to sell his share of the Butter Group to Akiva. Later alleging that he'd been underpaid for the deal, Sartiano subsequently sued Akiva for $15 million. Returning to New York, in October 2017 Sartiano founded the fast-casual restaurant Broken Coconut in NoHo.

=== 2020-2023 ===
He founded the private social club Zero Bond in October 2020. Located in a NoHo loft, the club bans photography. It quickly became popular with celebrities, and New York City mayor Eric Adams held his election night party at the venue in November 2021.

Sartiano opened a bar named Darling on the roof of the Park Lane New York hotel in early 2022, with his company Bond Hospitality running the Park Lane New York's food and beverage program. Also in 2022, Sartiano was serving as a partner and creative director of The Mercer Hotel in SoHo. He established the restaurant Sartiano's in The Mercer in 2023, with Alfred Portale as culinary director. The Robb Report called it an "upscale red-sauce joint" inspired by Sartiano's family roots in Naples.

=== 2024-2025 ===
Sartiano re-opened the establishment Submercer at the Mercer Hotel in early 2024, at which point his company Bond Hospitality was operating seven venues in New York and Boston. That summer he leased the Hedges Inn in the Village of East Hampton. Becoming manager of the hotel, he began operating a Sartiano's restaurant at the inn, with guests such as Meghan Markle and other celebrities. According to the Wall Street Journal, the venture "met with a storm of resistance from neighbors and village officials," who argued the restaurant might "[destroy] the village’s character and tranquility with celebrity-studded bacchanalia." Sartiano closed the Hedges Inn restaurant in September 2024. The Observer named him to its Nightlife and Dining Power List of 2023 and 2024. Among other venues, Sartiano continues to operate Zero Bond and Sartiano's in Manhattan, and he has also been involved in building a Zero Bond at the Wynn Las Vegas, which is scheduled to open in 2025.

== Boards and committees ==
In December 2021 he was on the transition committee of then Mayor-elect of New York Eric Adams. In February 2022 he was appointed by Adams to the board of trustees for the Metropolitan Museum of Art. Serving on the art and institutions committee of Community Board 2 in Manhattan, Sartiano has been involved in supporting several art and museum projects.

== Personal life ==
Sartiano began dating Allie Rizzo, a Wilhelmina model, in 2008. Engaged in 2010 and married in 2014, they live with their family in the NoHo neighborhood of Manhattan.

== See also ==
- List of American restaurateurs
- List of Columbia College people
