= Christian Liaigre =

French interior designer (1943–2020)

- Born: 10 August 1943; La Rochelle, Nouvelle-Aquitaine, France
- Died: 4 September 2020 (aged 77)
- Education: École nationale supérieure des Beaux-Arts; École nationale supérieure des arts décoratifs
- Occupations: Interior designer Architect

Christian Liaigre (10 August 1943 – 4 September 2020) was a French interior designer and architect.

== Biography ==
Born into a family from Vendée, Liaigre entered the École nationale supérieure des Beaux-Arts and the École nationale supérieure des arts décoratifs before meeting Alberto Giacometti. Giacometti led him to the workshop of Constantin Brâncuşi, but Liaigre left to help his grandfather breed racehorses. In 1981, he designed a collection of cabinets for Nobilis.

In 1985, he opened his first store, and he designed the Hôtel Montalembert in 1990. In 1997, he designed The Mercer Hotel in New York City. His clients included Larry Gagosian, Marina Abramović, Bryan Adams, Calvin Klein, Rupert Murdoch, and Carole Bouquet. The Wall Street Journal described Liaigre as a "great minimalist". He owned boutiques in London, Chicago, Bangkok, Saint Barthélemy, Kuala Lumpur, and Paris.

The American designer Holly Hunt first introduced Liaigre's work to the U.S., and he designed the Christian Liaigre for Holly Hunt Collection from 1994 to 2011.

== Personal life ==
Liaigre was married to Deborah Comte, with whom he had a son. He died on 2 September 2020 at the age of 77.

== Bibliography ==
- Ypma, Herbert J. M.; Liaigre, Christian (2004). Maison. Thames & Hudson. ISBN 978-0-500-51162-6.
- Liaigre, Christian (2 June 2015). Liaigre 12 Projects. Paris: Flammarion-Pere Castor. ISBN 978-2-08-020187-4. OCLC 1064569396.

== See also ==
- List of French architects
- List of interior designers
