= Alfred Portale =

American chef (born 1954)

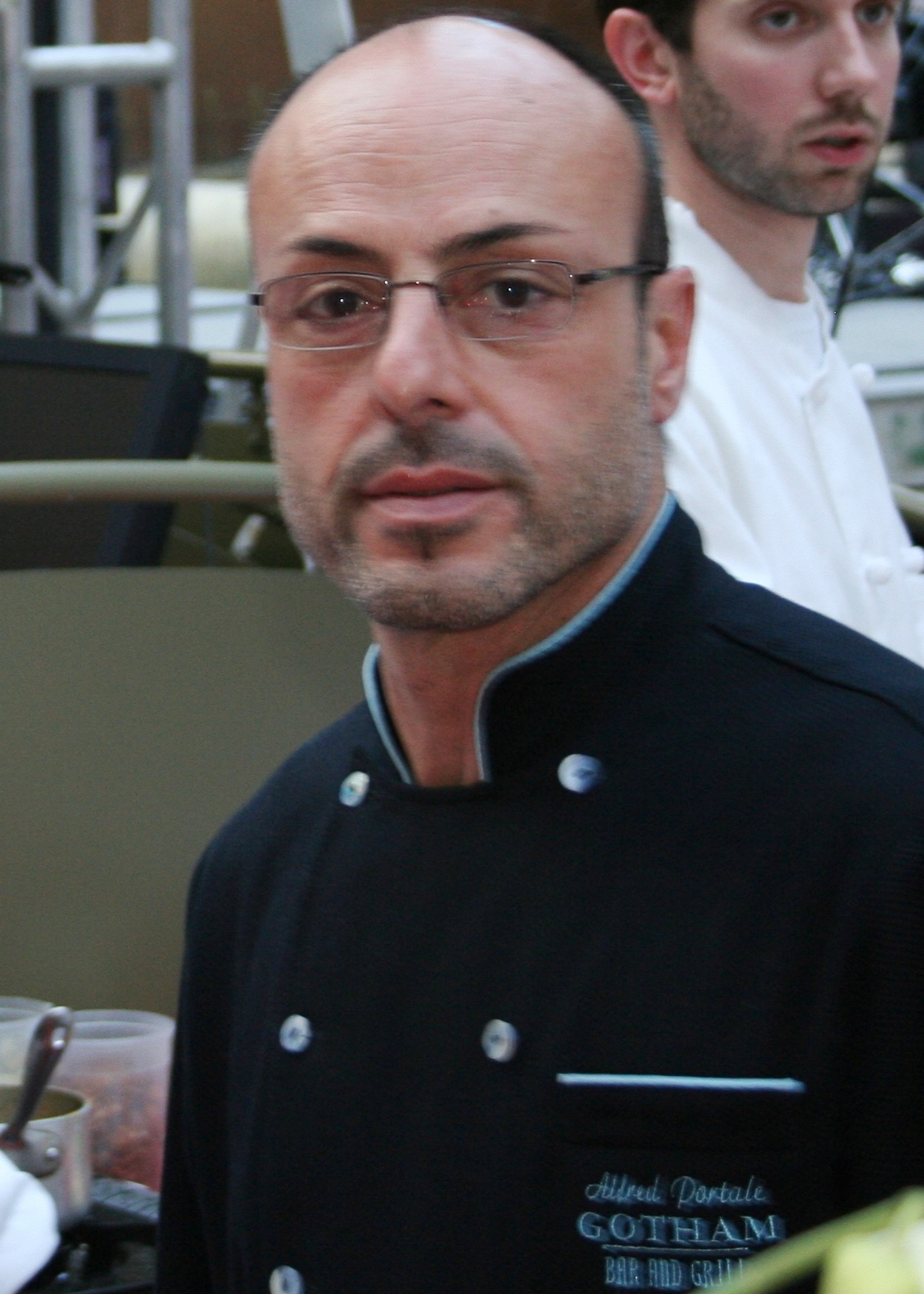
- Alfred Portale at Tutto Italia in NYC 2007
- Born: July 5, 1954 (age 72); Buffalo, New York, U.S.
- Education: Culinary Institute of America
- Culinary career
- Cooking style: New American cuisine
- Rating(s): 3 Stars New York Times, 1 Michelin Star, 27 Food Ranking in Zagat.
- Current restaurant(s): Portale Restaurant, Zero Bond, Sartiano's
- Previous restaurant(s): Gotham Bar & Grill
- Television show: Top Chef (season 3)
- Award(s) won: 2006 James Beard Award for Best Chef, 2002 James Beard Award for Most Outstanding Restaurant, 1993 James Beard Award Best Chef: New York City
- Website: http://www.portalerestaurant.com

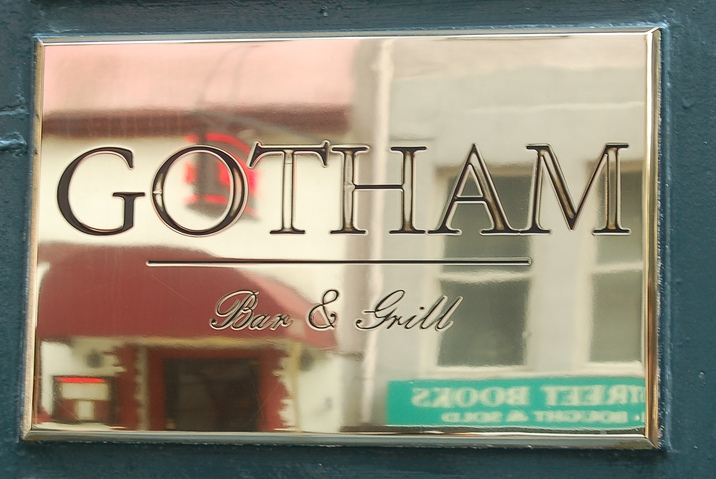
Gotham Bar & Grill

Alfred Portale (born July 5, 1954), in Buffalo, New York, is an American chef, author, and restaurateur, is widely recognized as a pioneering figure in the New American cuisine movement.

After graduating (first in his class) from the Culinary Institute of America, Portale embarked on an intensive apprenticeship in France, where he refined his skills under the guidance of chefs such as Michel Guerard, Jean Troisgros, and Jacques Maximin.

== Restaurants ==
In 1984, shortly after he returned to the United States, Portale was appointed Executive Chef and Partner at Gotham Bar and Grill. Although the restaurant had struggled in its first year, Portale oversaw a period of growth by focusing on seasonal ingredients and new presentation styles. During his tenure, he became known for developing vertical plating, an architectural style of food presentation that became a trend in the 1980s.

Alfred Portale won multiple nominations and three James Beard Award wins for Outstanding Chef (2006), Outstanding Restaurant (2002) and Best Chef: New York City (1993).

Alfred Portale left Gotham Bar and Grill in July 2019 to open his namesake in November 2019.

In March 2026, Portale was named the new Culinary Director at Sartiano's Steakhouse at the Wynn Las Vegas.

== Publishing and television ==
Portale is the author of three cookbooks in collaboration with others and alone: Gotham Bar and Grill Cookbook(1997), and Twelve Seasons Cookbook: A Month-by-Month Guide to the Best There is to Eat (2000), and Simple Pleasures: Home Cooking from the Gotham Bar and Grill's Acclaimed Chef (2004).

He has also made television appearances, most notably as a guest judge on the episode of Top Chef originally broadcast on June 27, 2007, and as a featured chef with Julia Child in her PBS series In Julia's Kitchen with Master Chefs on December 16, 1995.

== Cookbooks ==
- Alfred Portale Simple Pleasures: Home Cooking from the Gotham Bar and Grill's Acclaimed Chef (2004) ISBN 0-06-053502-4
- Alfred Portale's Gotham Bar and Grill Cookbook (1997) ISBN 0-385-48210-8
- Alfred Portale's Twelve Seasons Cookbook: A Month-by-Month Guide to the Best There is to Eat (2000) ISBN 0-7679-0606-3
- Cooking by the Book – Alfred Portale
