= The Mercer Hotel =

Hotel in Manhattan, New York

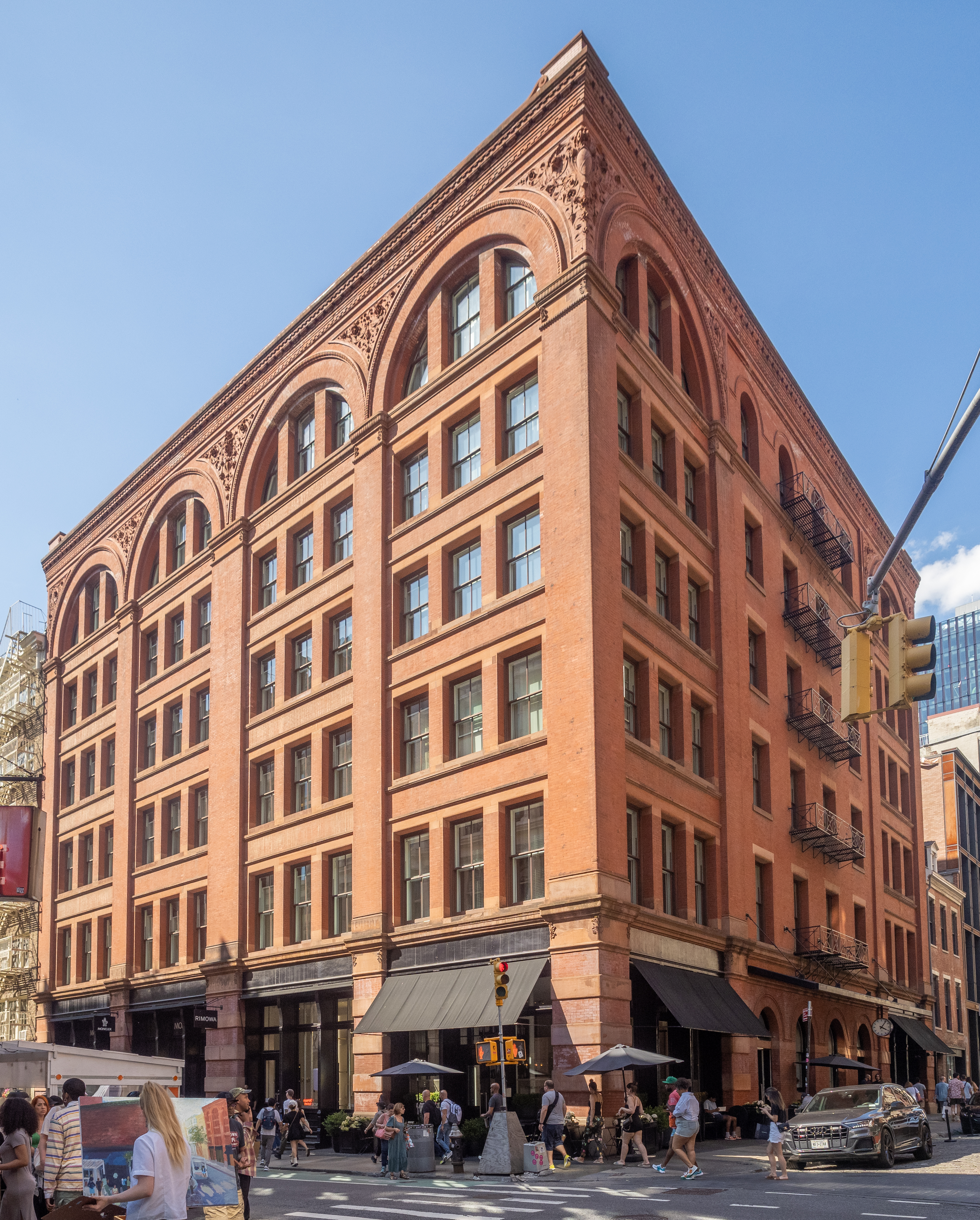
- The Mercer Hotel (2022)
- Interactive map of the The Mercer Hotel area

General information
- Architectural style: Romanesque Revival
- Location: 147 Mercer Street, SoHo, New York City
- Coordinates: 40°43′29″N 73°59′54″W
- Completed: 1890
- Owner: BD Hotels
- Governing body: private

Technical details
- Floor count: 6

Design and construction
- Architect: William Schickel

Other information
- Number of rooms: 73
- Number of restaurants: 2
- Number of bars: 1

Website
- mercerhotel.com

The Mercer Hotel, located at the corner of Mercer and Prince Streets in SoHo, Manhattan, New York City. It offers 73 guest rooms on six floors of a Romanesque Revival building, and features Sartiano's Italian restaurant and the Submercer lounge.

Opened in 1997, The Mercer is the sister hotel to The Greenwich Hotel.

== History ==
Built in 1890 for John Jacob Astor III, the six-story, 84,000 square foot brick building has been cited by the New York City Landmarks Preservation Commission as an example of the Romanesque Revival period. Architect William Schickel, known for his extensive work on behalf of the Archdiocese of New York, designed the building as offices for the vast Astor family holdings, resulting in a façade considerably more ornate than its industrial neighbors. Prior to its conversion, the building served as artists' lofts and studios, for which the hotel has become known.

The long-shuttered property was acquired in 1988; BD Hotels, with André Balazs refurbished the building, then opened as The Mercer in 1997. It was SoHo's first hotel, and was later noted as SoHo's first five-star hotel. They launched The Mercer Kitchen restaurant (1998–2022) the following year. In 2023, Zero Bond founder Scott Sartiano joined as a partner at The Mercer with BD Hotels, and established its contemporary food and beverage services.

== Design ==
The overall aesthetic allows The Mercer to be "the first hotel to offer an authentic taste of loft living", an urban signature that is completely original to New York.

Parisian designer Christian Liaigre ensured all furnishings were kept original and exclusive to the hotel. Liaigre created a modernist interior with an emphasis on harmonized proportions and subtle color palettes.

== Sartiano's ==
Scott Sartiano opened Sartiano's Italian restaurant at The Mercer in June 2023. Culinary director and James Beard Award-winning chef Alfred Portale oversees the open kitchen's menu.

Sartiano's replaced the former Mercer Kitchen, which had closed in 2022, operates the hotel's upper level café, and provides room service throughout the hotel.

In 2024, Sartiano reopened the brick-walled Submercer lounge, a storied SoHo bar, below its main dining room.

In March 2025, Sartiano's opened a location at the Wynn Las Vegas on the Las Vegas Strip led by 3-time James Beard Award winner Alfred Portale.
