= B'Day Anthology Video Album =

Video by Beyoncé
- Released: April 3, 2007
- Recorded: 2006–2007
- Genre: R&B
- Length: 69:36
- Label: Columbia; Music World; Sony Music
- Director: Ed Burke; Ray Kay; Beyoncé Knowles; Jake Nava; Anthony Mandler; Diane Martel; Melina Matsoukas; Sophie Muller; Cliff Watts

Beyoncé video chronology
Beyoncé: The Ultimate Performer (2006)	B'Day Anthology Video Album (2007)	The Beyoncé Experience Live (2007)

B'Day Anthology Video Album is the third DVD by American singer-songwriter Beyoncé. It was released through Columbia Records, Sony Music and Music World Entertainment exclusively through Walmart stores on April 3, 2007 alongside the deluxe edition, but was later serviced to other retailers. The DVD features thirteen music videos for songs from her second studio album, B'Day (2006) and its deluxe edition (2007). Beyoncé shot nine videos for the album, and four pre-filmed videos were also included. B'Day Anthology Video Album has been certified double platinum by the Recording Industry Association of America (RIAA). Outside North America, the album was featured as a bonus disc to the deluxe edition of B'Day. The "Still in Love (Kissing You)" video was the subject of a copyright infringement lawsuit, therefore only initial pressings of the album contain its video.

== Background ==
First it was just "Green Light" and "Upgrade U". Let's sneak in "Kitty Kat". We might as well put in "Suga Mama". We gotta do "Get Me Bodied", that's the dance record. Gotta do something for "Beautiful Liar", that's the song with Shakira, of course we know we gotta do a video for that ... If I had another week I probably would have shot three more videos.
—Beyoncé, "Anthology Behind the Scenes"

Beyoncé said that she filmed B'Day Anthology Video Album because she "always wanted to do a video album" so that her fans wouldn't have to log onto YouTube to watch her music videos, but could instead play them via DVD. Beyoncé knew what the videos' choreography would be before the filming began. She also planned her hairstyles, outfits and make-up. Beyoncé wanted each video to look different, and therefore she used different film techniques, fashion and styling. B'Day Anthology Video Album contains thirteen music videos and behind the scenes footage. The videos for "Déjà Vu", "Ring the Alarm", "Irreplaceable" and "Listen" had been shot prior to the album's filming. The other nine videos were filmed in a two-week period. B'Day Anthology Video Album contains music videos for all of the songs from the standard edition of B'Day except for "Resentment". It also includes videos for "Beautiful Liar", "Flaws and All" and "Still in Love (Kissing You)", which were featured only on the deluxe edition. According to Vibe, the thirteen videos on B'Day Anthology Video Album gave Beyoncé the record of the most music videos released in a twelve-month period.

== Release and promotion ==
B'Day Anthology Video Album was released through Columbia Records and Music World Entertainment exclusively through Walmart on April 3, 2007, the same day that the deluxe edition of B'Day was released. The video album was made available to other retailers on June 19, 2007. Outside North America, the video album was featured as the second disc on the deluxe edition of B'Day albeit without "Anthology Behind the Scenes". Irreemplazable, an extended play (EP) featuring Spanish-language recordings, was included as the bonus disc in North America. Prior to its release, copies of the videos were ripped from an advance album and leaked onto the internet in MP4 form. Beyoncé promoted the album by appearing on television shows Today and The Early Show, while television channel VH1 Soul aired several of its videos.

== Critical reception ==
Sal Cinquemani of Slant Magazine criticized the music videos for the songs on B'Day Anthology Video Album, writing that "none of them are anything special, though most will please narrow-minded fans". To celebrate the album's tenth anniversary, Billboard published "Beyoncé's Best Fashion Moments from Her Decade-Old 'B'Day Anthology Video Album'", the list in which Billboard editor Da'Shan Smith commented on ten best outfits Beyoncé wore in the music videos, on April 3, 2017, and stated: "The project has delivered audiences some of the singer's most iconic looks. In every frame she appears in, Beyoncé oozes a radiant confidence, wearing stunning outfits and costumes to match. Here is the project's ten best looks – from House of Deréon signatures to impromptu costume designs and haute couture get ups." The same day, Vibe published a list in which Smith ranked all thirteen music videos from the worst to the best; he stated: "B'Day Video Anthology Album must be heralded as an important pop culture artifact. As expressed before, it's the birther of Beyoncé's passion for providing fans visual sequences they need to tell an album’s story. Imagine a B'Day without its Anthology—although the go-go and funk infused tracks already made an impression upon audio listens only, the visuals made the record pop to life."

== Commercial performance ==
B'Day Anthology Video Album debuted at number twenty-four on the US Top Music Videos chart dated April 28, 2007. It was certified double platinum by the Recording Industry Association of America (RIAA) on October 3, 2007, denoting the shipments of 200,000 copies.

== Controversy ==
Beyoncé covered Des'ree's song "Kissing You" for the deluxe edition of B'Day and retitled it "Still in Love (Kissing You)". She filmed a video of the song for B'Day Anthology Video Album; however one of the conditions set out by Des'ree's publishers, the Royalty Network, was that Beyoncé did not release the song in video form. The Royalty Network filed a copyright infringement lawsuit against the involved parties seeking US$150,000 in damages. Infringing copies of B'Day Anthology Video Album were recalled in April 2007, and in October 2007 the lawsuit was dismissed with prejudice. Later copies of the album did not contain "Still in Love (Kissing You)".

== Track listing ==
No.	Title	Director(s)	Length
1.	"Beautiful Liar" (featuring Shakira)	Jake Nava; Beyoncé Knowles	3:34
2.	"Irreplaceable"	Anthony Mandler	4:17
3.	"Kitty Kat"	Melina Matsoukas; Knowles	1:03
4.	"Green Light"	Matsoukas	3:31
5.	"Upgrade U" (featuring Jay-Z)	Matsoukas; Knowles	4:38
6.	"Flaws and All"	Cliff Watts; Knowles	4:14
7.	"Get Me Bodied" (Extended Mix) (featuring Kelly Rowland, Michelle Williams and Solange Knowles)	Mandler; Knowles	6:42
8.	"Freakum Dress"	Ray Kay; Knowles	3:21
9.	"Suga Mama"	Matsoukas; Knowles	3:37
10.	"Déjà Vu" (featuring Jay-Z)	Sophie Muller	4:06
11.	"Ring the Alarm"	Muller	3:33
12.	"Listen" (director's cut)	Diane Martel	3:49
13.	"Still in Love (Kissing You)" (later removed)	Watts; Knowles	4:41
14.	"Credits"		0:51
15.	"Anthology Behind the Scenes"	Ed Burke	17:39

Notes

- The length of each of the music videos includes a five-second bumble bee introduction, except for "Green Light", which is listed as a continuation of "Kitty Kat" and therefore has no introduction. The credits and "Anthology Behind the Scenes" also do not include introductions.

== Personnel ==
Credits adapted from the video "Credits".

- Richard J. Alcock – DVD production
- Nate Adams – assistant choreography
- Raymon Baynes – co-choreography
- Kim Bradshaw – video production
- Ben Cooper – production
- Fusako Chubachi – art direction, design
- Cindy Denkhaus – video coordination
- Frank Gatson – lead choreography
- Erwin Gorostiza – art direction
- Jil Haden – production
- Danielle Hobbs – assistant choreography
- Ty Hunter – styling
- Dan Ichimoto – design
- ilovedust – logo
- Quincy S. Jackson – marketing
- Grant Jue – production
- Shelli Jury – production
- Ray Kay – direction
- Kimberly Kimble – hair
- Beyoncé Knowles – direction, executive production, co-choreography
- Mathew Knowles – executive production
- Tina Knowles – styling
- Anthony Mandler – direction
- Diane Martel – direction
- Clifford McGhee – co-choreography
- Melina – direction
- Jonte' Moaning – co-choreography
- Galo Morales – animation
- Sophie Muller – direction
- Jake Nava – direction
- Danielle Polanco – co-choreography
- Rhapsody – co-choreography
- Todd Sams – co-choreography
- Tanisha Scott – co-choreography
- Shakira – co-choreography
- Bethany Strong – assistant choreography
- Fransesca Tolot – make-up
- Cliff Watts – direction
- John Winter – production
- Max Vadukul – photography
- Camille Yorrick – production

== Charts ==
Chart (2007)	Peak position
US Music Video Sales (Billboard)	24

== Certifications ==
Region	Certification	Certified units/sales
United States (RIAA)	2× Platinum	200,000^{^}
^{^} Shipments figures based on certification alone.
