= Suga Mama =

Song by Beyoncé

from the album B'Day
- Recorded: 2006
- Studio: Sony Music Studios (New York, NY)
- Genre: Funk; soul; R&B
- Length: 3:25
- Label: Columbia
- Songwriters: Beyoncé Knowles; Rich Harrison; Makeba Riddick; Chuck Middleton
- Producer: Harrison

Music video
- "Suga Mama" on YouTube

"Suga Mama" is a song by American singer Beyoncé Knowles for her second studio album, B'Day (2006). It was written by Knowles, Rich Harrison, and Makeba Riddick, and produced by Harrison and Knowles. "Suga Mama" is influenced by 1970s funk and rock music. An R&B and soul song, "Suga Mama" is built on a hip hop and jazzy beat, and samples Jake Wade and the Soul Searchers' song "Searching for Soul", written by Chuck Middleton. Lyrically, it features the female protagonist willing to pay large sums of money to keep her love interest contented.

"Suga Mama" was generally well received by music critics, who noted it as one of the highlights from B'Day and complimented Harrison's production. However, there was some limited criticism about Knowles' vocal delivery on the song. Though not released as a single, "Suga Mama" had a music video filmed in black-and-white, and directed by Melina Matsoukas and Knowles, for the B'Day Anthology Video Album. It received a limited release to British music TV channels. "Suga Mama" was added on the set list of Knowles' world tour, The Beyoncé Experience (2007).

== Recording ==
Knowles enlisted Harrison as one of the five co-producers of B'Day, and she arranged for him, Sean Garrett and Rodney Jerkins to be given individual rooms at Sony Music Studios in New York City. Knowles said she fostered "healthy competition" between the producers by going into each of their rooms and commenting on the "great beats" the others were creating. She and Harrison had previously collaborated on her 2003 single "Crazy in Love", which uses a prominent soul music sample in a similar manner to "Suga Mama". Fox News said that "Suga Mama" and "Freakum Dress", Harrison's other contribution to B'Day "fall short of originality but mimic the Chi Lites [sic] percussion section [of "Crazy in Love"] yet again", adding, "Harrison is like the Indiana Jones of soul, constantly pulling out forgotten gems of the past for sampling [...] You can't help but think: Thank God someone wrote music in the past that can be repurposed now."

== Music and theme ==
"Suga Mama"
A 20-second sample of the song, which is backed by instrumentation that sounds like live music. Knowles tells her love interest that she wants to be his "Suga Mama" as she wants to take good care of him.

"Suga Mama" is a moderate R&B and soul song that displays influences of the 1960s as well as 1970s funk and rock music. It also song contains limited elements of the 1980s go-go and sounds more closely resembling live music than Knowles' previous recordings. According to the sheet music published by Hal Leonard Corporation, "Suga Mama" was composed using common time in the key of G minor, with a moderate tempo of 94 beats per minute. Knowles' vocals span from the low note of C_{4} to the high note of G_{5} as she sings on a hip hop and jazzy beat. The main instrumentation is provided by a bluesy guitar. IGN Music noted that "Suga Mama" is built of a "static grit groove", and Jody Rosen of Entertainment Weekly wrote that the song consists of a mixture of "brute power and slick syncopation". It samples Jake Wade and the Soul Searchers' song "Searching for Soul", which was written by Chuck Middleton.

"Suga Mama" features the female protagonist offering up the keys to her house and car, and her credit card just to keep her love interest and his good loving at home, presumably so that he can listen to her collection of old soul records. These interpretations are shown in the lines: "It's so good to the point that I'll do anything just to keep you home ... Tell me what you want me to buy, my accountant's waiting on the phone ...". The woman also sees the man as a sex object, asking him to sit on her lap and "take it off while I watch you perform". Staff members of USA Today contrasted "Suga Mama" with the 1999 song "Bills, Bills, Bills" by Destiny's Child (of which Knowles was a member), writing that "From needing somebody to pay her automo-bills, [Knowles is] now doling out the cash as a satisfaction-seeking 'Suga Mama'." Dave de Sylvi of Sputnikmusic noted that Knowles sings: "I could be like a jolly rancher that you get from the corner store" with the same sense of mischief as Christina Aguilera on 'Candyman' (2007)." On the other hand, Gail Mitchell of Billboard magazine noticed that the song's lyrical arrangement was similar to that of Tina Turner's work. A remix of the song features American rapper Consequence.

== Critical reception ==
The song received generally positive reviews. Jim DeRogatis of the Chicago Sun-Times, who reviewed B'Day negatively, wrote that "Suga Mama" was the "best moment" on the album, and that it "owes much of its charm to lifts from Jake Wade and the Soul Searchers". Likewise, Bernard Zuel The Sydney Morning Herald cited "Suga Mama" as one of the "good moments" on B'Day, writing: "... followed by a dud ... the slinky funk of 'Suga Mama' is trodden on by the mechanical 'Upgrade U' and then trampled by the posturing and eventually annoying 'Ring the Alarm'". Chris Richards of The Washington Post commented that Rich Harrison "delivers again with 'Suga Mama', twisting a vintage Soul Searchers sample into a gritty, loping groove. Beyonce sounds right at home on this one ... And while it doesn't quite eclipse 'Crazy in Love', it's still B'Day's finest moment." Andy Kellman of Allmusic described "Suga Mama" as a "spectacularly layered" track.

Eb Haynes of AllHipHop considered "Suga Mama" to be an embodiment of "the woman wearing and buying $500 stiletto pumps." Dave de Sylvi of Sputnikmusic wrote that Knowles is as "sweet and faux-innocent" as the 1960s soul stars in the song. Jody Rosen of Entertainment Weekly wrote that songs such as "Suga Mama" showcase of Knowles' virtuosity and continued, "No one – not R. Kelly, not Usher, to say nothing of her rival pop divas – can match Beyoncé's genius for dragging her vocal lines [...]". By contrast, IGN Music criticized Knowles' vocals in the song, writing that she "comes in over the low-end track with too much earnestness, drowning out the funky grooves with her piercing dramatic mezzo-soprano. If she were a throaty alto, she'd fit the beats that have been served up to her much more appropriately."

== Music video ==
Knowles riding a mechanical bull in the music video

The accompanying music video for "Suga Mama" was released to British music channels in April 2007. It was shot in black-and-white and was co-directed by Melina Matsoukas alongside Knowles for the B'Day Anthology Video Album, which was released the same month; "Suga Mama" was one of eight videos shot in two weeks for the video album. It begins with Knowles sitting in a chair, wearing men's clothing and smoking a cigar. She gets up and begins to pole dance. The remainder of the video presents Knowles dancing on top of a sugar cube, dancing with backing dancers whose faces are partially concealed, lying in a circle of light, and riding a mechanical bull. Knowles said she is meant to "slowly become a woman" during the video, adding "Well, a sexier woman – I'm always a woman."

Knowles rehearsed the pole dancing using two ballet bars, which was when it was decided to add a pole above her head to form an arc. Though she is from Texas, she had never previously been on mechanical bull. There were no problems during warm-ups, but the man operating the bull during the video shoot programmed it to go faster, causing Knowles to fall off when she tried to perform tricks such as lifting up her foot, leaning back and turning around. To minimize the time Knowles spent on the bull, the director shot the sequence at twelve frames per second (see frame rate) and Knowles sang twice as quickly, but it wasn't until 4:00 am that they completed work.

== Live performances ==
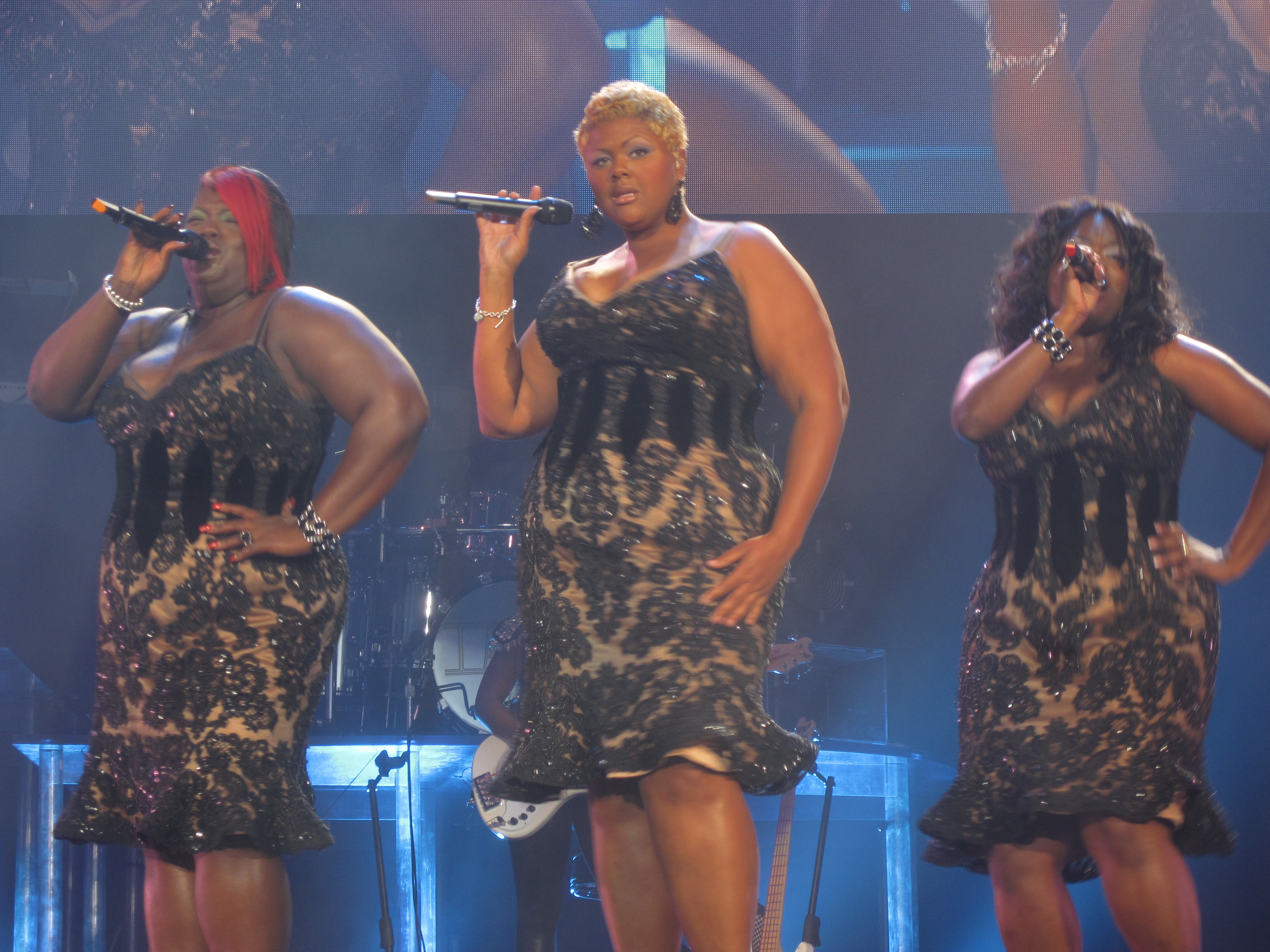
The Mamas providing backing vocals on Knowles' I Am... World Tour

Although Knowles did not perform "Suga Mama" in any televised appearances, the song was a part of her set list on The Beyoncé Experience (2007). In Los Angeles, Knowles performed segments of the song, dressed in a golden, translucent slip and golden, sparkling panties. It was executed without backup dancers, but with live instrumentation and only backup singers toward the performance's conclusion. "Suga Mama" was included on her 2007 live album The Beyoncé Experience Live. Bill Friskics-Warren of The Tennessean wrote that the song "was even sexier and more gutbucket than on record".
