= Flaws and All =

Song by Beyoncé

Song by Beyoncé

from the album B'Day: Deluxe Edition
- Studio: Roc the Mic, New York City
- Genre: R&B
- Length: 4:07
- Label: Columbia
- Songwriters: Shaffer "Ne-Yo" Smith; Shea Taylor; Beyoncé Knowles; Solange Knowles
- Producers: Taylor; B. Knowles

Music video
- "Flaws and All" on YouTube

"Flaws and All" is a song recorded by American singer Beyoncé from the deluxe edition of her second studio album, B'Day (2006). It was composed by Ne-Yo, Shea Taylor, Beyoncé and Solange Knowles, while Beyoncé Knowles and Taylor produced it. In the R&B song, Beyoncé shows appreciation for the love given by her man, who sees through all of her flaws and loves her unconditionally. "Flaws and All" received positive reviews from critics, who lauded Beyoncé's emotion and vulnerability on the track. Some critics also noted that the song was better than some of the songs on the standard edition of B'Day.

The music video was directed by Cliff Watts and Beyoncé for B'Day Anthology Video Album (2007). It features clips of a B'Day promotional ad by Wal-Mart pieced together, in which Beyoncé does not lip-sync the words of the song, but instead acts as if it were an everyday scenario. Beyoncé explained the concept for the video was to show a different side to her, that the paparazzi does not show and that fans would not normally see. Beyoncé performed "Flaws and All" on The Beyoncé Experience (2007), and was also sung by her on The Ellen DeGeneres Show, Revel Presents: Beyoncé Live (2012), and Renaissance World Tour (2023).

== Background ==
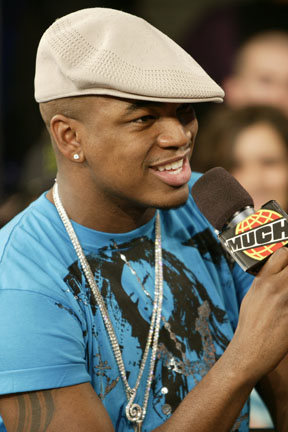
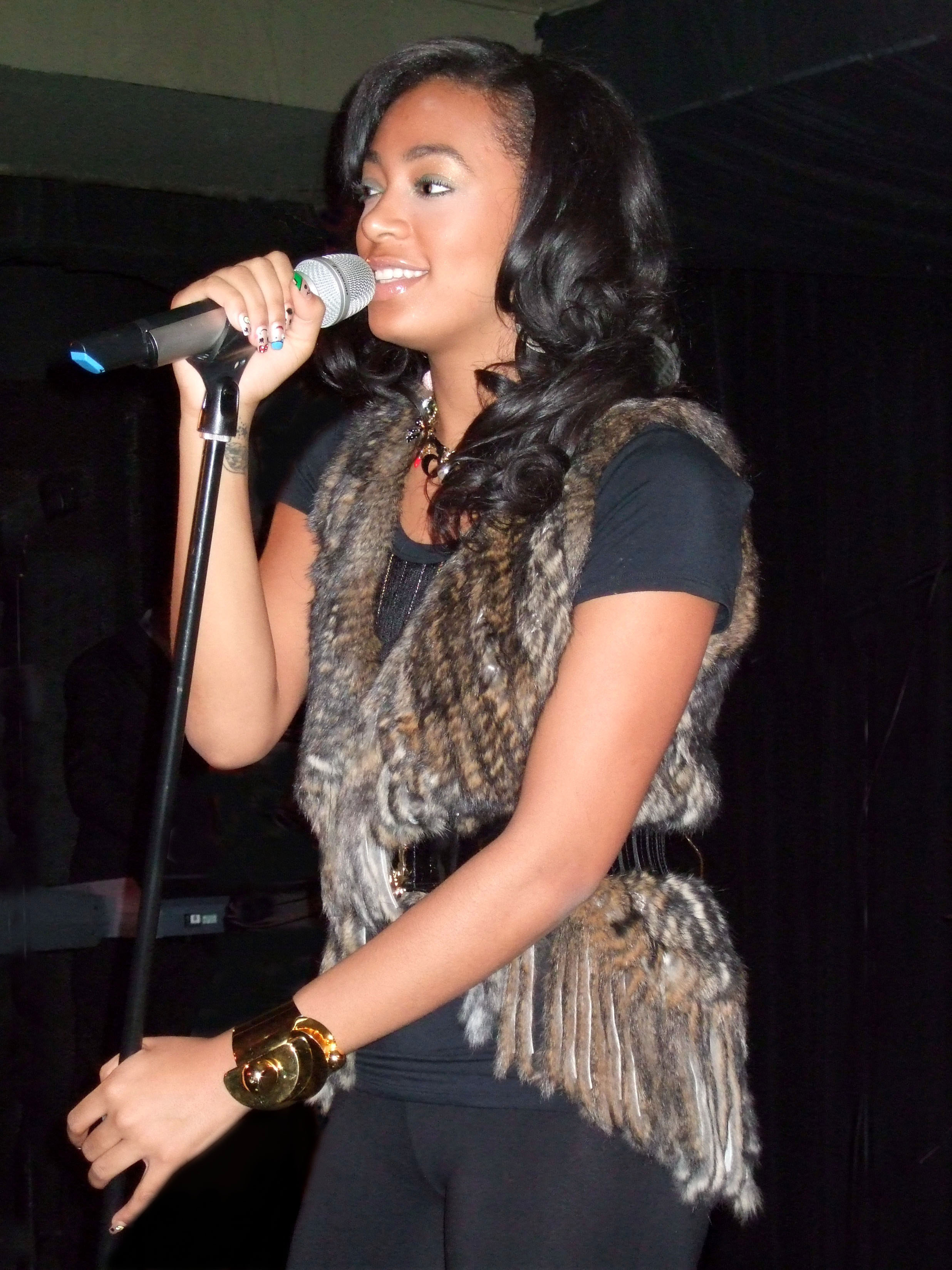
Ne-Yo (left) and Beyoncé Knowles' sister, Solange (right), assisted in the writing of "Flaws and All".

"Flaws and All" was written by Ne-Yo, Shea Taylor, Beyoncé Knowles and her sister Solange Knowles. The R&B song was produced by Beyoncé Knowles and Taylor, and mixed by Jean-Marie Horvat at Oz Recording Studios, Valencia, California. "Flaws and All" was recorded by Jim Caruana, Shane Woodley and Robert "LB" Dorsey at Roc the Mic studio, New York City. Although the song was originally included on the re-release of B'Day, it was additionally included on compilation albums. In 2007 the song was included on Tyler Perry's Why Did I Get Married? soundtrack. In 2008, Beyoncé released the song on a compilation album dedicated to karaoke performances titled Beyoncé Karaoke Hits, Vol. I. Author Latrice Gleen references the song in a memoir titled My Life's Journey (2010).

In a 2022 interview with Revolt, songwriter Ne-Yo revealed that 'Flaws and All' was originally written with Britney Spears in mind. In a later interview with Capital London in the UK, he explained that Spears did not attend the scheduled recording sessions, attributing this to her personal challenges at the time.

== Reception ==
"Flaws and All"
A 25-second sample of "Flaws and All" in which critics praised Knowles' vocal vulnerability in the song.

Chris Willman of Entertainment Weekly named the song as his favorite addition to the deluxe edition of B'Day, stating, "Better is 'Flaws and All', a ballad in which B[eyoncé] expresses melismatic gratitude that workaholic bitches (her words!) merit love too." Rory Dollard of Metro also wrote that the song was better than some of the tracks on the original track listing of B'Day. While reviewing the deluxe edition of B'Day, Sal Cinquemani of Slant Magazine praised the song, calling it a "surprise gem [which] sound[s] downright subtle". BET included the song in its list of the "Top 10 Feel Good R&B Songs", ranked at number nine. Discussing their choice, they stated "'Flaws and All' ... revealed Beyoncé at her most vulnerable. The song showed that even a superstar can struggle with insecurities and be in need of someone to love her." Bobby Reed of Chicago Sun-Times noted that the lyrics could also refer to "the way fans worship Beyonce". Anthony Venutolo of New Jersey On-Line noted that the song talks about true love. Destiny's Child bandmate Kelly Rowland discussed the track during Billboard's "Woman of the Year" spread for Beyoncé. She stated "Beyoncé is a true artist who brings it every time. My favorite song will always be 'Flaws and All.' So much feeling, so beautiful; her voice sounds amazing."

== Music video ==
Well, I am a little silly, I am a little goofy, and it's great. There are a lot of things I keep to myself, because that's the only way you keep your sanity. This [video] is the way my family sees me, it's me being who I really am. It's been 10 years, and it's time for people to see that side of me. It's not about glamour, not about celebrity, not about being a diva — it's about someone loving you for you.
—Beyoncé Beyoncé, Beyoncé: Behind the B'Day Music Videos

The music video for "Flaws and All" was directed by Cliff Watts and Beyoncé. The video for the song was shot on inexpensive Super 8 film during the two-week filming for the B'Day Anthology Video Album (2007). Critics have noted that Beyoncé emulates Marilyn Monroe, Brigitte Bardot and Barbra Streisand throughout the clip. During an interview with MTV on a "Beyoncé: Behind the B'Day Music Videos", MTV commented on Beyoncé's appearance in the music video stating that she acts like "a goofball" and "it also feels like we get to see the real [her]." Beyoncé replied, "I'm way different in my everyday life. My personal life and my celebrity life — I've separated them so much it's like two different people. But I'm pretty balanced. I'm over the top and I'm natural."

In an interview with Vibe, Beyoncé explained that the concept for the video in depth after being questioned as an "everyday woman." "I don't sing any of the song. The whole time it's like a silent movie and I'm being myself. I'm not performing. I reveal a side of myself no one's ever seen. I'm silly and goofy and not...trying to be a diva, or trying to be a star – just me." The video features a black and white theme and a grainy film texture. Beyoncé does not lip-sync the lyrics but acts out parts of the song and poses. Several of the scenes used in the video had been shot in 2006 for a B'Day promotional ad by Wal-Mart.

== Live performances ==
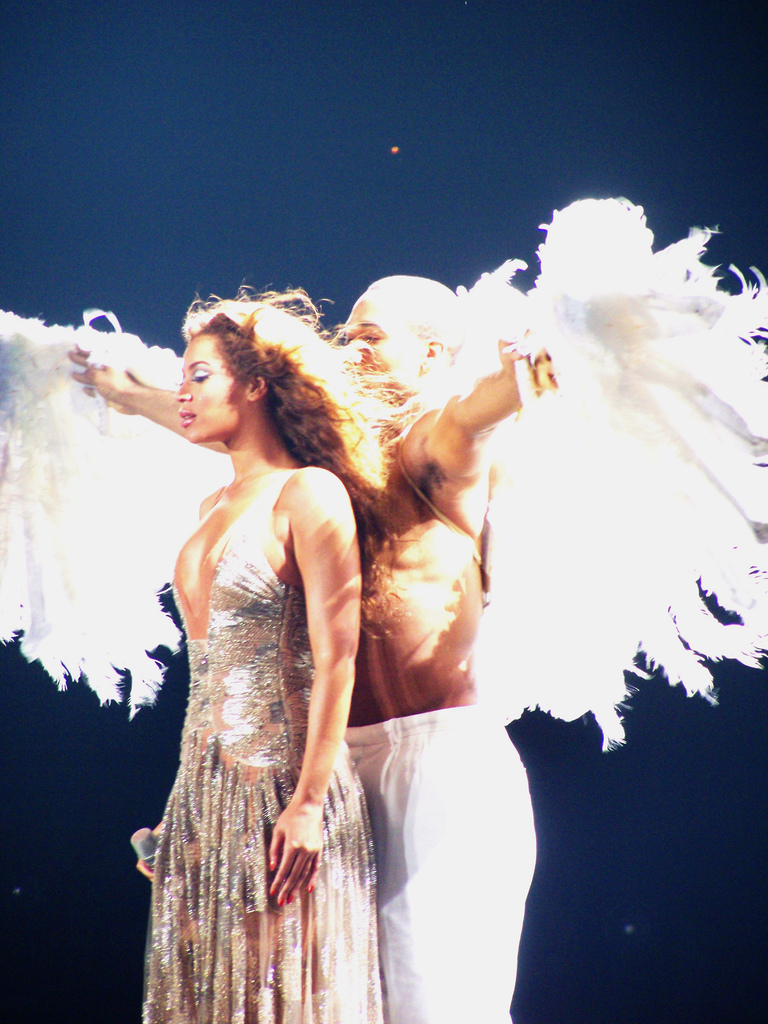
Beyoncé performing "Flaws and All" on The Beyoncé Experience

Beyoncé performed the song on multiple occasions, including the song as part of her set list on The Beyoncé Experience (2007). Beyoncé cried during the performance, and was then embraced by a male dancer dressed as an angel. Chris Willman of Entertainment Weekly praised Beyoncé's performance of the song stating "The true defibrillator moment, all freakum dress changes aside, is 'Flaws and All', during which Beyoncé weeps real tears (nightly, according to reports from earlier overseas shows) while apologizing for being such a bitch. That's a rare campy, melodramatic performance in an otherwise energized two hours." The performance also caught the attention of The New York Times writer Jon Pareles who stated, "Along the way the concert was a showcase for her consistently expanding music, from the kinetic dance beats of songs like 'Get Me Bodied' to dramatic ballads like 'Flaws and All', which Beyoncé sang wide-eyed in a video close-up." J. Freedom du Lac of The Washington Post wrote that during the performance she was offering a "litany of her own 'imperfections' that her lover embraces unconditionally". Anthony Venutolo of New Jersey On-Line wrote that the performance was "silly". The performance of the song in Los Angeles on September 2, 2007, was taped and included on The Beyoncé Experience Live. The performance of the song was also shown independently at MTV.com and was released via digital download at the iTunes Store on November 19, 2007.

Beyoncé performed the song on The Ellen DeGeneres Show on November 25, 2008 while promoting her third album I Am... Sasha Fierce. In May, 2012, she performed "Flaws and All" as a part of her revue show Revel Presents: Beyoncé Live at Revel Atlantic City. While reviewing the show, Ben Ratliff of The New York Times wrote, "She has a fast-reacting face, and opens her eyes wide to look astonished, touched, or grateful. (She did this especially during 'Flaws and All,' which she dedicated to her fans: 'I don't know why you love me/And that's why I love you.')" A writer for Vibe magazine listed the performance of the song in the five notable moments from the concerts, saying that Beyoncé "had the camera zoom in on her face the whole time, showing the crowd her own 'flaws,' allowing the crowd to connect to her". "Flaws and All" was also included on the live album Live in Atlantic City (2013) which was filmed during the revue. In 2013, Beyoncé added the song to the set list of her worldwide The Mrs. Carter Show World Tour. During the performance she dedicated the song to her fans, the BeyHive.

A decade later, the song again appears on the setlist of Beyoncé's Renaissance World Tour, as part of the show's first act composed mainly of ballads and deep cuts from the artist's discography.

== Credits and personnel ==
Credits are taken from B'Day Deluxe Edition liner notes.

- Jim Caruana – recording
- Tom Coyne – mastering
- Rober "LB" Dorsey – recording
- Jean-Marie Horvat – mixing
- Beyoncé Knowles – writing, production, vocals
- Solange Knowles – writing
- Collin Miller – digital prep engineering
- Ne-Yo – writing, co-production
- Shea Taylor – writing, production
- Michael Tocci – recording
- Shane Woodley – recording
