= Beyoncé: The Ultimate Performer =

Video by Beyoncé
- Released: November 26, 2006
- Recorded: 2006
- Genre: R&B
- Labels: Music World; Columbia

Beyoncé video chronology
Live at Wembley (2004)	Beyoncé: The Ultimate Performer (2006)	B'Day Anthology Video Album (2007)

Beyoncé: The Ultimate Performer is a live DVD by American singer-songwriter Beyoncé. It was released on November 26, 2006 through Columbia Records and Music World Entertainment. The DVD features exclusive footage and concerts that were held in France, Japan, the United Kingdom and the United States. Following its re-release on August 31, 2010, Beyoncé: The Ultimate Performer peaked at number seventeen on the Spanish DVD Chart, thirteen on the Italian FIMI DVD Chart and twenty on the US Billboard Top Music Video chart.

== Content ==
Beyoncé: The Ultimate Performer contains exclusive footage and concerts that Knowles held in France, Japan, the United Kingdom and the United States. The DVD starts with the performances of the songs "Irreplaceable" and "Ring the Alarm" in Budokan, Japan. It continues with performances of Déjà Vu" and "Crazy in Love" from the Robin Hood Benefit in New York City. An "Interview and Performance" from Good Morning America follows. "Baby Boy" and "Naughty Girl" are then shown as performed at the Cipriani Wall Street Series. The performances section of the DVD finishes with the performance of "Dangerously in Love 2" at the Wembley Arena in London, England. The DVD's special features section contains photo shoots, the making of "Ring the Alarm" and its music video. It features the songs "Déjà Vu", "I Want You Back", "Crazy in Love", "Ring the Alarm", "Say My Name", "Survivor", "Irreplaceable", "Baby Boy", "Naughty Girl", "Proud Mary" and "Dangerously in Love 2".

== Release ==
Beyoncé: The Ultimate Performer was released on November 26, 2006. The DVD was re-released on August 31, 2010. The DVD was also released in Australia on December 3, 2010.

== Commercial performance ==
After the re-release, Beyoncé: The Ultimate Performer peaked at number seventeen on the Spanish DVD Chart for the week ending November 29, 2010 and it stayed on the same position the next week and the next week, it fell out of the chart. The DVD also peaked at number thirteen on the Italian FIMI DVD Chart. On the US Billboard Top Music Video chart, Beyoncé: The Ultimate Performer peaked at number twenty for the week ending September 18, 2010.

== Track listing ==
Beyoncé: The Ultimate Performer – Live performances
No.	Title	Length
1.	"Irreplaceable"/"Ring the Alarm" (live from Budokan, Japan)
2.	"Déjà Vu"/"Crazy in Love"" (live from Robin Hood Benefit in New York City, New York)
3.	"Interview & Performance" (live on Good Morning America)
4.	"Baby Boy"/"Naughty Girl" (live from Cipriani Wall Street Serires)
5.	"Dangerously in Love 2" (live at Wembley)

Beyoncé: The Ultimate Performer – Special features
No.	Title	Length
1.	"Photo Shoots"
2.	"The Making of "Ring the Alarm""
3.	"Ring the Alarm" (music video)

Beyoncé: The Ultimate Performer – Reissue edition
No.	Title	Length
1.	"Déjà Vu"
2.	"I Want You Back"
3.	"Crazy in Love"
4.	"Ring the Alarm"
5.	"Say My Name"
6.	"Survivor"
7.	"Irreplaceable"
8.	"Baby Boy"
9.	"Naughty Girl"
10.	"Proud Mary"
11.	"Dangerously in Love 2"

== Charts ==
Chart (2010–2011)	Peak position
Italian Music DVD (FIMI)	13
Spanish Music DVD (Promusicae)	17
US Music Video Sales (Billboard)	20
