= Beautiful Liar =

2007 single by Beyoncé and Shakira

Single by Beyoncé and Shakira

from the album B'Day: Deluxe Edition
- Released: February 12, 2007
- Recorded: 2006
- Studio: Battery (New York); Sony Music (New York); La Marimonda (Nassau, Bahamas); Futura Productions (Roslindale, Massachusetts); Hit Factory Criteria (Miami)
- Genre: Latin pop; R&B
- Length: 3:20
- Label: Columbia; Music World
- Composers: Mikkel S. Eriksen; Tor Erik Hermansen; Beyoncé; Amanda Ghost; Ian Dench
- Lyricists: Ghost; Dench; Beyoncé
- Producers: Stargate; Beyoncé

Beyoncé singles chronology
"Amor Gitano" (2007)	"Beautiful Liar" (2007)	"Get Me Bodied" (2007)

Shakira singles chronology
"Las de la Intuición" / "Pure Intuition" (2007)	"Beautiful Liar" (2007)	"Si Tú No Vuelves" (2007)

Music video
- "Beautiful Liar" on YouTube

"Beautiful Liar" is a song by American singer-songwriter Beyoncé and Colombian singer-songwriter Shakira. It was written by Beyoncé, Amanda Ghost, Ian Dench, and Stargate members Mikkel S. Eriksen and Tor Erik Hermansen, and produced by Stargate and Beyoncé for the deluxe edition of Beyoncé's second solo studio album, B'Day (2006). The mixing of the song was done by Gustavo Celis. "Beautiful Liar" was released on February 12, 2007, through Columbia Records and Music World Entertainment as the only single from the deluxe edition of the album. Spanish and Spanglish mixed versions of the song were produced, the former being titled "Bello Embustero".

"Beautiful Liar" is a mid-tempo song; musically, it is a melding of Shakira's Latin and Arabic styles with Beyoncé's contemporary hip hop and R&B styles. Its theme is female empowerment; two female protagonists sing about being charmed by the same man, but instead of fighting over him, both ladies agree that he is not worth their time. The song was well received by music critics, who praised generally Beyoncé's and Shakira's collaboration. "Beautiful Liar" was nominated for Grammy Award for Best Pop Collaboration with Vocals at the 50th Grammy Awards (2007), while the Spanish version was nominated for Latin Grammy Award for Record of the Year at the Latin Grammy Awards of 2007. It won an Ivor Novello Awards for Best-Selling British Song in 2008.

"Beautiful Liar" was commercially successful. It peaked at number three on the US Billboard Hot 100 chart and experienced the largest upward movement on that chart until 2008. The song peaked at number one in various countries, including France, Germany, Hungary, Ireland, Italy, the Netherlands, New Zealand, Switzerland, and the United Kingdom. Its accompanying music video, directed by Jake Nava, incorporates belly dancing moves. "Beautiful Liar" won the MTV Video Music Award for Most Earthshattering Collaboration at the 2007 MTV Video Music Awards. The song was included on Beyoncé's set list during her world tour The Beyoncé Experience (2007).

== Conception and recording ==
"Beautiful Liar" was written by Mikkel S. Eriksen, Tor Erik Hermansen, Amanda Ghost, Ian Dench, and Beyoncé. It was produced by Eriksen and Hermansen using their stage name, Stargate, and Beyoncé. Eriksen told Sound on Sound, "This song is very simple. Most of the time we have more chords in a song, because we find it hard writing a great song on just one chord. But if you do it right, you can make it work, and this song is an example." The track had already been written in 2006. Eriksen and Hermansen played it to their manager, Tyran Smith, who said that it would be perfect for a duet between Shakira and Beyoncé. Eriksen and Hermansen considered this to be impossible, however Smith was devoted to that idea. As they had no lyric or top melody, various writers attempted to finish the song. The first three attempts were not satisfactory, and Smith put Eriksen and Hermansen to work together with Ghost and Dench, who wrote a significant part of the lyrics and the melody.

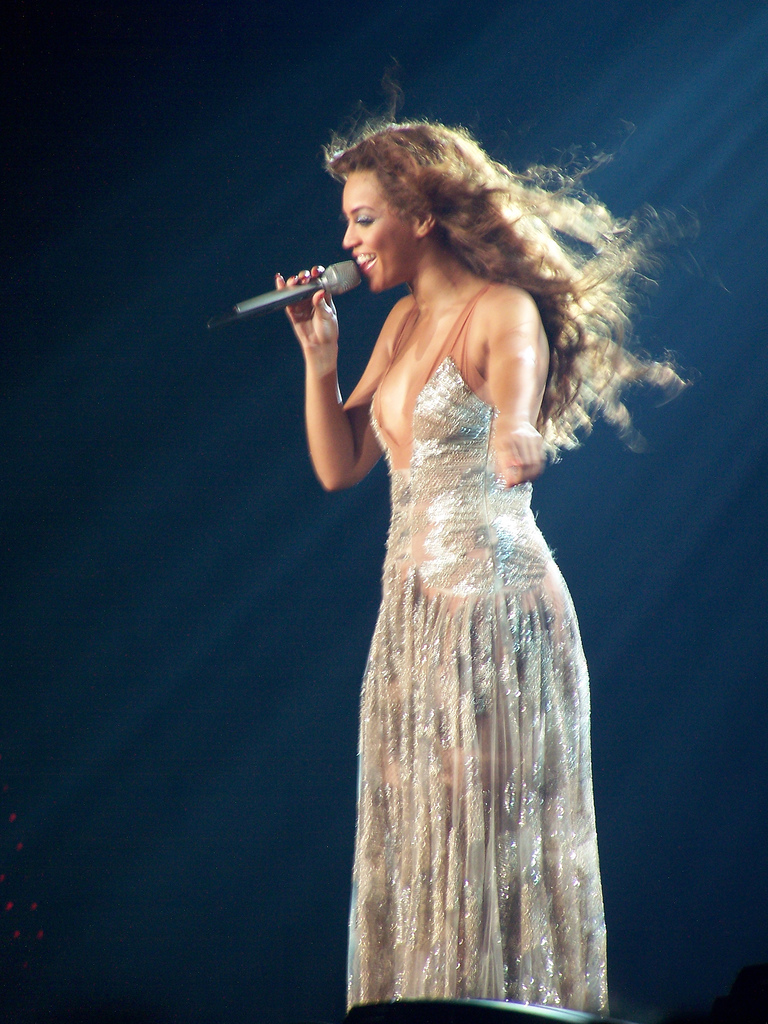
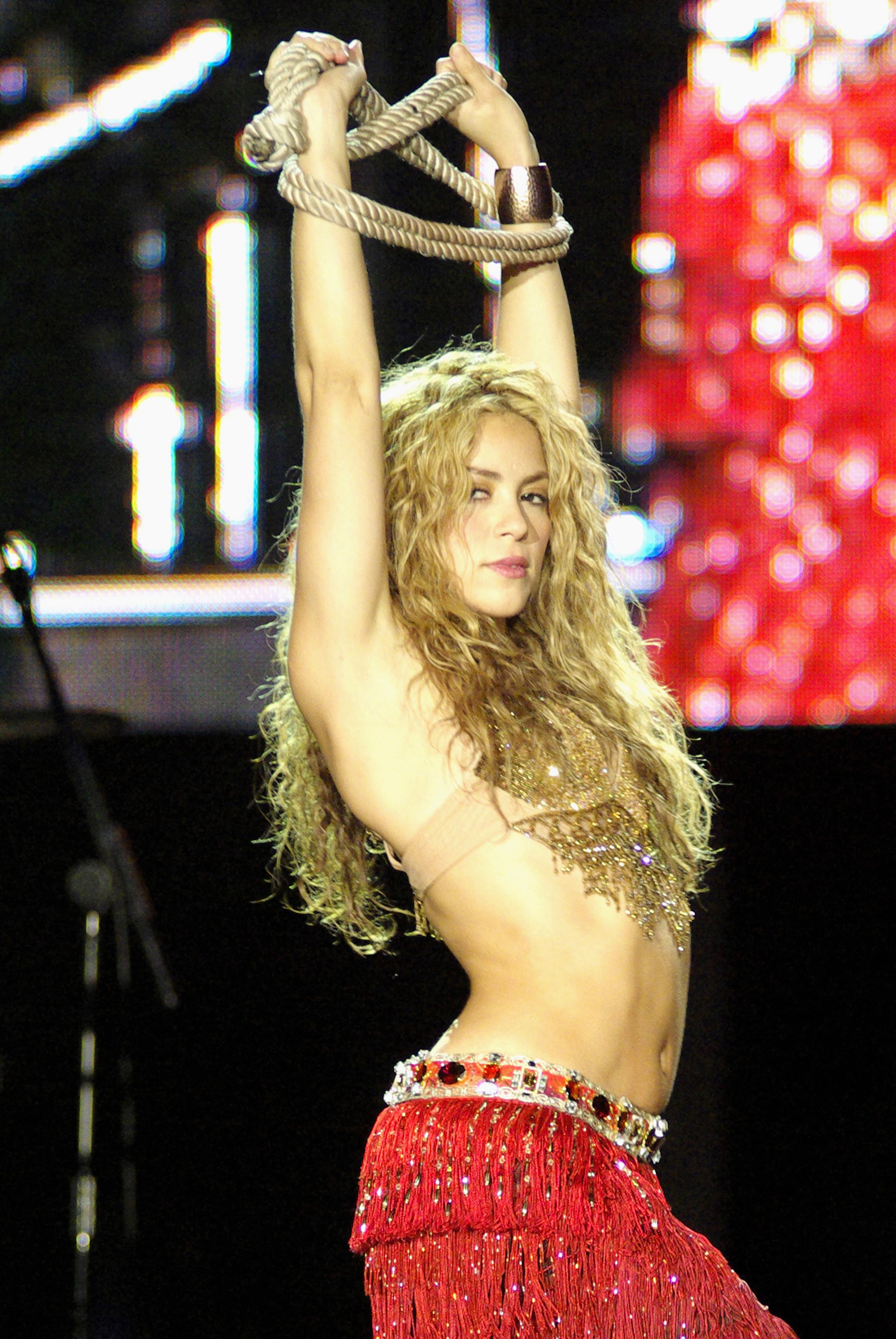
Beyoncé (left) and Shakira (right) recorded their respective parts in separate studios in 2006. They just met to film the music video.

"Beautiful Liar" initially had a Spanish title and different lyrics. Hermansen re-titled it when he heard the line "beautiful liar" in one of the verses. When the production of the song was almost completed, it was presented to Beyoncé, who approved it. She recorded a solo version a few months before the release of the deluxe edition of B'Day (2006) adding new lines and producing the song alongside Eriksen and Hermansen, handling the vocal production and arrangement. Beyoncé confirmed that she would perform a duet with Shakira in an interview for Univision in December 2006. In another interview for MTV News, Beyoncé said that she met Shakira several times at various awards shows, and they talked about plans to collaborate on a song as they are both fans of each other and respect each other's work. Beyoncé said that she was very happy that they were able to work together after waiting for years.

When Beyoncé invited her to record a song for the re-release of Beyoncé's studio second album, B'Day, Shakira was touring and consequently had difficulties to match her schedule with Beyoncé's. A few months later, Shakira agreed to sing on the track. As she recorded her vocals, the songwriters and producers added the ethnic strings and percussion break. Beyoncé and Shakira recorded their vocals in different studios; "Beautiful Liar" was recorded at Sony Music Studios and Battery Studios in New York City, La Marimonda in Nassau, Bahamas, The Hit Factory in Miami, Florida, and Futura Productions in Boston, Massachusetts.

== Composition ==
"Beautiful Liar"
An 18-second sample of "Beautiful Liar", demonstrating the melange of Shakira's Latin and Arabic styles with Beyoncé's contemporary hip hop and soul music styles.

"Beautiful Liar" is an R&B and Latin pop song, which is written in the key of G Phrygian dominant, and set in common time at a tempo of 96 beats per minute. Beyoncé's vocal range spans from G_{3} to B♭_{5}. Anna Pickard of The Guardian found elements of Latino and bounce music. The song opens with Shakira's vocals accompanied by a piping, Middle Eastern figure, later joined by a mariachi-flavored horn section. Groaning noises can be heard in the background which complement the melody. The names of the two singers are then heard: "Bee on say, be-on-SAY! Sha kee ra, Sha-ki-RA". The verses are sung on a mid-tempo, strutting, hip-thrusting arrangement, accented by rapid, flamenco-like hand claps and guitar strums. The song also features Arabic instruments such as, oud and ney.

Lyrically, "Beautiful Liar" speaks about two women who chose not to end a friendship because of a man who has cheated both of them. Its theme is one of female independence. Beyoncé told MTV News that "Beautiful Liar" is about female empowerment, in keeping with the theme of the album: "It's about a guy who's kind of playing both of us, and instead of us arguing over the guy we say, 'Forget him. Let's stick together. He's a beautiful liar." The chorus features the lines, "Let's not kill the karma, let's not start a fight" with the female protagonists bonding in their mutual betrayal. Beyoncé and Shakira sing with staccato, intense vocal approach throughout the song. Beyoncé sings the lines "I didn't know about you then, till I saw you with him again" earnestly while Shakira later adds "I walked in on your love scene, slow dancing". In the end, the female protagonists conclude, "we can live without him", referring to their cheating lover.

== Release ==
"Beautiful Liar" was leaked onto the internet and appeared as an unpaid download in early February 2007. The song was sent to radio stations in the United States on February 12, 2007; it was added to rhythmic contemporary, contemporary hit radio, and urban contemporary playlists. "Beautiful Liar" was released as a CD Single in Australia on March 14, 2007, and on April 16, 2007, in the United Kingdom where it was released as a digital download two days earlier. In Europe, the song was released as a digital EP on April 14, 2007, and a maxi single on April 20, 2007. "Beautiful Liar" was later serviced as a digital EP in the UK and the US on May 20, 2007. Different versions of the song were produced; Puerto Rican reggaeton artist Don Omar recorded verses for one of the song's remixes, but this was not released. In the UK, most radio stations, including Radio 1 played an up-beat dance remix of "Beautiful Liar" by the Freemasons instead of the original mix. Celis produced and mixed a Spanish-language version, titled "Bello Embustero", with additional lyrical contributions by Rudy Pérez. The Spanish version appeared on some regional releases of the deluxe edition of B'Day in late May 2007.

== Critical response ==
Nick Levine of Digital Spy awarded "Beautiful Liar" three stars out of five and wrote that it "isn't as ridiculously overblown" as previous collaborations of Whitney Houston and Mariah Carey on "When You Believe" (1998) and Barbra Streisand and Celine Dion on "Tell Him" (1997). However, he added that "it's as calculated as a wannabe page 3 model's decision to have a boob job", and that an accompanying music video will keep fans happy. Ben Sisario of The New York Times called it a "steamy track". Richard Cromelin of the Los Angeles Times wrote that the singers "have fun with the grand soap-operatics" of the song adding that "Beautiful Liar" has "cultural as well as musical resonance, furthering Beyonce's bilingual agenda". Chris Willman of Entertainment Weekly wrote that the song "is a minor letdown; Shakira's voice is too like Beyoncé's for a truly complementary tango". On April 26, 2011, Gary Trust of Billboard magazine listed "Beautiful Liar" at the fourth position on his list of the 10 All-Female Hit Collaborations, calling it a "female-bonding boy-bashing anthem". Erika Ramirez and Jason Lipshutz of the same publication ranked the song at number 22 on their list of "Beyonce's 30 Biggest Billboard Hits". In 2014, Emily Exton of VH1 placed the track on her list of Shakira's best duets, calling it a "sexy ode to the men we know we can't trust" and praising both singers for their complementing vocal performance.

The song was nominated for Best Pop Collaboration with Vocals at the 50th Annual Grammy Awards. Its Spanish version was nominated at the 8th Annual Latin Grammy Award for Record of the Year. In Europe, "Beautiful Liar" won the Best-Selling British Song at the 2008 Ivor Novello Awards. It was deemed eligible for the award because British songwriters Amanda Ghost and Ian Dench had worked on it.

== Commercial performance ==
Immediately after its release, "Beautiful Liar" reached number one on the iTunes best-seller list in March 2007. The song debuted at number 94 on the US Billboard Hot 100 chart; most sales were digital downloads. The following week, it rose 91 positions to number three after 150,000 download copies were sold; this set a record for the largest upward movement in the history of the Hot 100 chart, until it was surpassed by Britney Spears's 2008 single "Womanizer", Kelly Clarkson's 2009 single "My Life Would Suck Without You", and Taylor Swift’s 2019 single “Me!”. The song became Beyoncé's ninth top 10 single in the US (as a solo artist), and Shakira's fourth. On the US Pop 100 chart, "Beautiful Liar" rose from number 77 to number three. It is one of the few singles to debut at number one on both the US Hot Digital Tracks chart and US Hot Digital Songs chart. In mid-May, the song peaked at number one on the US Hot Singles Sales, becoming the fifth single from B'Day to accomplish this feat. "Beautiful Liar" was certified platinum by the Recording Industry Association of America (RIAA) in February 2009, denoting shipment of one million copies. As of March 2014, it has sold over 1,419,000 paid digital downloads in the US.

Elsewhere, "Beautiful Liar" reached number one in 32 countries. In the UK, the Freemasons remixed version of the song was widely promoted by radio stations, including BBC Radio 1, where it was put on the A-List. Two weeks before the CD release, the song debuted on the UK Singles Chart at number 10, based solely on downloads sales, which accumulated to 37,500 units in its first week. It became both Beyoncé's and Shakira's highest debut on the UK Singles Chart based on digital sales alone. After the physical release, "Beautiful Liar" reached number one, becoming Beyoncé's third UK number one single, and Shakira's second. It remained at number one for three weeks. On June 20, 2007, the song was certified gold by the British Phonographic Industry (BPI), denoting sales of 400,000 copies. "Beautiful Liar" was 2007's 12th biggest-selling single in the UK. As of September 2014, the single has sold 430,000 units in the UK. In Lebanon, the song reached number six (Note: See #Charts), while in Australia, it reached number five, and was the country's 51st best-performing single in 2007. The Australian Recording Industry Association (ARIA) certified "Beautiful Liar" two times platinum, denoting shipment of 70,000 copies. It debuted at number one on the New Zealand Singles Chart, and topped the Irish Singles Chart. In Turkey, the song was awarded the best selling foreign single in 2007 by Mü-Yap.

== Music video ==
The music video for "Beautiful Liar" was directed by Jake Nava, who directed most of Beyoncé's other videos. It was filmed over two days, during the two-week production of B'Day Anthology Video Album. Due to a busy schedule, the production team did not have enough time for the choreography. The dance sequences were choreographed spontaneously and the routines were rehearsed in 40 minutes. Beyoncé learned some of the choreography from Shakira, who created most of them and taught Beyoncé some belly dancing moves. Beyoncé originated the idea of playing a lookalike after an experience when she saw a boy dancing, and thought he was performing before a mirror, but realized he was dancing with another person. The music video premiered on MTV's Total Request Live on February 28, 2007.

The first half of the video features Beyoncé and Shakira in separate scenes. It begins with the women's faces masked by smoke. As the video progresses they are featured against several different backgrounds, including dawn (Beyoncé) and dusk (Shakira); sheets blown in the wind; bamboo covered with yellow orchids; a room with blue neon lighting and Avestan writing on the walls; and a background of stormy weather. Slow dance moves and belly dancing, during a breakdown after the bridge, are featured throughout the video. The women wear matching hairstyles and black outfits for the entirety of the video.

Alex Denney of Yahoo! Music wrote that the dance moves of Beyoncé and Shakira in the video were convincing and erotic "without reaching the point of tackiness." He added that the music video "is a real treat for men and women alike. The catchy beat and their lithe, sexy dance just provides an amazing entertaining video." Nick Levine of Digital Spy praised the "gratuitous belly-wiggling" choreography in the video. James Montgomery of MTV News noted that the music video "is enough to give you whiplash" due to Beyoncé's and Shakira's dance abilities. Sal Cinquemani of Slant Magazine praised the scene during the bridge of the song, where Beyoncé and Shakira "begin mirroring each other's movements". Erin Strecker of Billboard noted how the clip "taught us all just how perfectly seductive the two could be". "Beautiful Liar" was nominated for the Video Of The Year award at the 2007 BET Awards, but another Beyoncé video, "Irreplaceable" won it. At the 2007 MTV Video Music Award, it won the Most Earthshattering Collaboration, a new category in the awards show that year. Beyoncé received the award alone because Shakira was in Canada during the ceremonies.

== Live performances ==
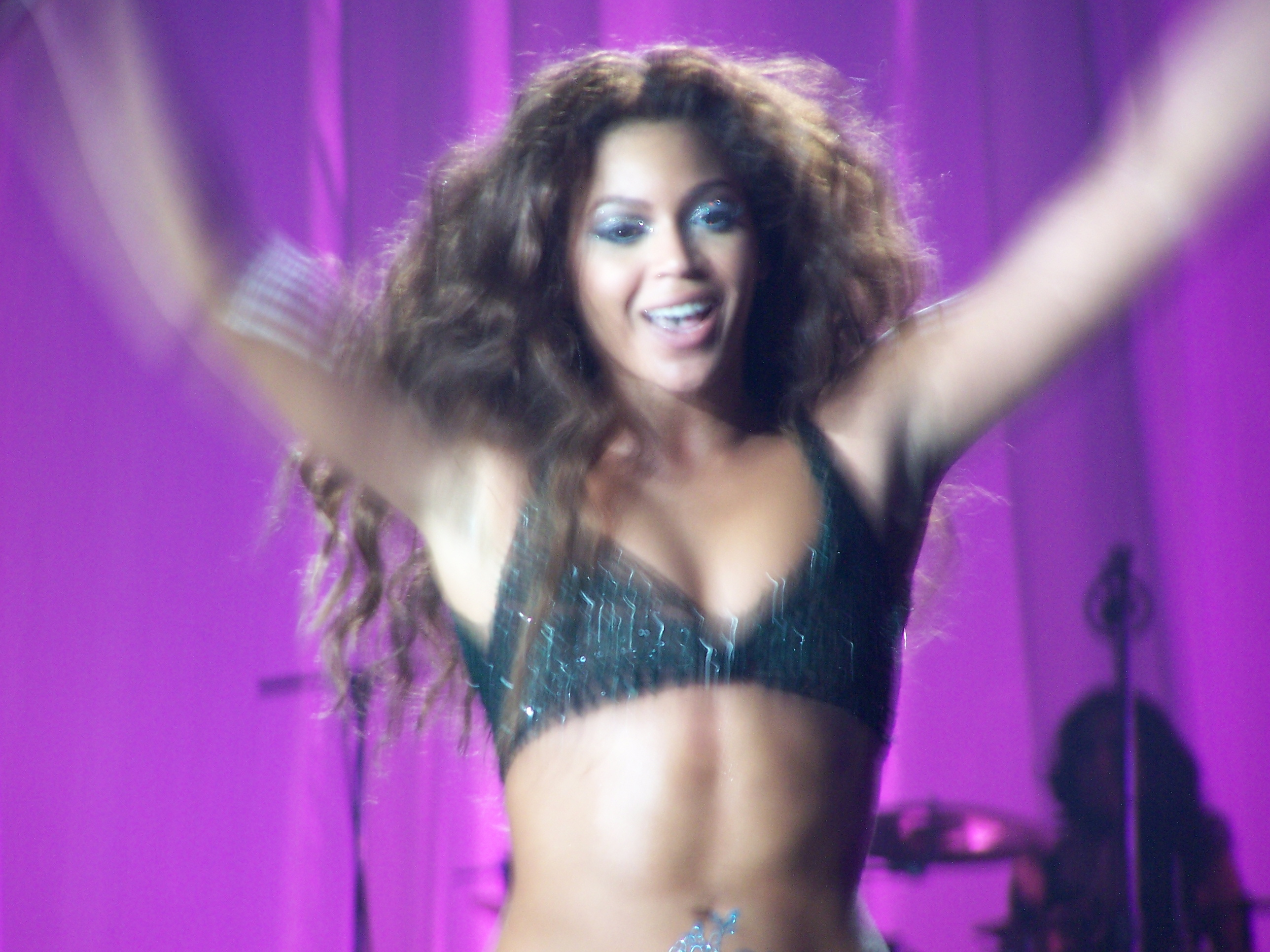
Beyoncé performing "Beautiful Liar" in Barcelona, Spain, during the 2007 The Beyoncé Experience tour

Beyoncé has not performed "Beautiful Liar" with Shakira and the latter has not performed the song live. Beyoncé's first and only televised performance of the song was during The Early Show on CBS on April 2, 2007, which was broadcast four days later. "Beautiful Liar" was later included on Beyoncé's set list during her 2007 tour The Beyoncé Experience. On The Beyoncé Experience, Beyoncé was dressed in a green belly dancing outfit and stood in darkness with dry ice billowing behind her. A microphone was then lowered from the ceiling and as she began singing the first verse, colored illumination was projected onto the backdrop. Beyoncé then performed several hip dance routines. Towards the end of the performance, pairs of female dancers, clothed in purple dresses, performed mirrored choreography. Beyoncé was accompanied by two drummers, two keyboardists, a percussionist, a horn section, three backup vocalists called The Mamas and a lead guitarist, Bibi McGill. Throughout the performance Shakira appeared on the video screen on stage. The song was performed 16 years later at the opening of the Atlantis Royal in Dubai.

While reviewing Beyoncé's performance at the Madison Square Garden in Manhattan, on August 5, 2007, Jon Pareles of The New York Times wrote, "Beyoncé needs no distractions from her singing, which can be airy or brassy, tearful or vicious, rapid-fire with staccato syllables or sustained in curlicued melismas. But she was in constant motion, strutting in costumes." Shaheem Reid of MTV News compared the performance with Michael Buffer further adding that "Beyoncé acknowledged Shakira by shaking her hips rapidly". While reviewing Beyoncé's performance of the song in Saskatoon on September 14, 2007, a writer of The StarPhoenix noted that it was one of the musical surprises during the evening. Jim Harrington from the San Jose Mercury News noted that Beyoncé's all-female band provided "plenty of punch" to the live performance of the song in Fresno on August 28, 2007, further noting that the singer looked like a "sex kitten purring through" the song. In Los Angeles, on September 2, Beyoncé performed "Beautiful Liar", dressed in a green belly-dancing outfit, with several female backup dancers, and live instrumentation. "Beautiful Liar" was included on Beyoncé's live album The Beyoncé Experience Live (2007).

== Formats and track listings ==
- US and UK Digital EP
1. "Beautiful Liar" (with Shakira) – 3:21
2. "Beautiful Liar (Bello Embustero)" (Spanish Version) - 3:22
3. "Beautiful Liar (Spanglish Version)" (featuring Sasha Fierce a.k.a. Beyoncé) - 3:21
4. "Beautiful Liar (Instrumental)" - 3:19
- New Zealand and UK Digital Download
1. "Beautiful Liar" (with Shakira) – 3:19
- Australia, New Zealand and UK CD Single
1. "Beautiful Liar" (with Shakira) – 3:19
2. "Beautiful Liar (Freemasons Remix Edit)" (featuring Shakira) - 3:27
- European Maxi single
1. "Beautiful Liar" (with Shakira) – 3:19
2. "Beautiful Liar (Freemasons Remix Edit)" (featuring Shakira) - 3:27
3. "Irreplaceable (Maurice Joshua Remix Edit)" - 4:03
4. "Déjà Vu (Freemasons Radio Mix)" - 3:15
5. "Beautiful Liar" (Video) - 3:34

== Credits ==
Credits are taken from the B'Day liner notes.Source:

- Omar Al-Musfi – Arabic percussion
- Roberto Almodovar – recording engineering
- Jim Caruana – recording engineering
- Gustavo Celis – recording engineering
- Olgui Chirino – vocal production
- Tom Coyne – mastering
- Ian Dench – writing
- Mikkel S. Eriksen – writing, other instruments
- Amanda Ghost – writing
- Max Gousse – artists and repertoire
- Tor Erik Hermansen – writing, other instruments
- Jean-Marie Horvat – mixing
- Hanna Khoury – violin, viola
- Rob Kinelski – assistant recording engineering
- Beyoncé – writing, vocals, production, arrangement, vocal production
- Mathew Knowles – artists and repertoire
- Colin Miller – assistant mixing
- Naser Musa – oud
- Rudy Perez – vocal production
- Denaun Porter – programming
- Boujemaa Razgui – ney
- Kareem Roustom – violin arrangement, additional string arrangements
- Shakira – vocals, additional production, arrangement, vocal production, violin arrangement
- Stargate – production, arrangement, recording engineering, programming
- David Stearns – assistant recording engineering
- John Weston – recording engineering, digital editing (strings)
- Visitante – programming

== Charts ==
=== Weekly charts ===
Weekly chart performance for "Beautiful Liar"
Chart (2007)	Peak position
Australia (ARIA)	5
Australian Urban (ARIA)	1
Austria (Ö3 Austria Top 40)	2
Belgium (Ultratop 50 Flanders)	2
Belgium (Ultratop 50 Wallonia)	5
Canada Hot 100 (Billboard)	2
Canada CHR/Top 40 (Billboard)	6
Canada Hot AC (Billboard)	19
CIS Airplay (TopHit)	7
Croatia International Airplay (HRT)	1
Czech Republic Airplay (ČNS IFPI)	8
Denmark (Tracklisten)	4
European Hot 100 Singles (Billboard)	1
Finland (Suomen virallinen lista)	2
France (SNEP)	1
France Airplay (SNEP)	1
Germany (GfK)	1
Global Dance Songs (Billboard)	3
Greece (IFPI)	1
Hungary (Rádiós Top 40)	1
Hungary (Single Top 40)	4
Ireland (IRMA)	1
Italy (FIMI)	1
Netherlands (Dutch Top 40)	1
Netherlands (Single Top 100)	1
New Zealand (Recorded Music NZ)	1
Norway (VG-lista)	2
Poland (Polish Airplay Charts)	2
Romania (Romanian Top 100)	2
Russia Airplay (TopHit)	24
Russia Airplay (TopHit) Freemasons remix	8
Scottish Singles Sales (Official Charts)	1
Slovakia Airplay (ČNS IFPI)	11
Sweden (Sverigetopplistan)	6
Switzerland (Schweizer Hitparade)	1
UK Singles (Official Charts)	1
UK Hip Hop/R&B (Official Charts)	1
US Billboard Hot 100	3
US Dance Club Songs (Billboard)	1
US Hot Latin Songs (Billboard) "Bello Embustero"	10
US Hot R&B/Hip-Hop Songs (Billboard)	70
US Pop Airplay (Billboard)	17
US Rhythmic Airplay (Billboard)	22
US Pop 100 (Billboard)	3
Venezuela Top 100 (Record Report)	15
Venezuela Pop Rock (Record Report)	1

=== Year-end charts ===
Year-end chart performance for "Beautiful Liar"
Chart (2007)	Position
Australia (ARIA)	51
Australian Urban (ARIA)	9
Austria (Ö3 Austria Top 40)	29
Belgium (Ultratop 50 Flanders)	18
Belgium (Ultratop 50 Wallonia)	29
Brazil (Crowley)	7
CIS (TopHit)	5
European Hot 100 Singles (Billboard)	7
France (SNEP)	27
France Airplay (SNEP)	21
Germany (Media Control GfK)	28
Greece (IFPI)	17
Hungary (Rádiós Top 40)	17
Ireland (IRMA)	19
Italy (FIMI)	4
Lebanon (Airplay Top 100)	6
Netherlands (Dutch Top 40)	10
Netherlands (Single Top 100)	13
New Zealand (RIANZ)	37
Romania (Romanian Top 100)	22
Russia Airplay (TopHit)	130
Russia Airplay (TopHit) Freemasons remix	11
Spain (PROMUSICAE)	12
Spain Ringtones (PROMUSICAE)	17
Sweden (Sverigetopplistan)	49
Switzerland (Schweizer Hitparade)	11
UK Singles (OCC)	12
UK Urban (Music Week)	13
US Billboard Hot 100	62
US Pop 100 (Billboard)	53

=== Decade-end charts ===
Decade-end chart performance for "Beautiful Liar"
Chart (2000–2009)	Position
CIS Airplay (TopHit)	78
Russia Airplay (TopHit) Freemasons remix	65

== Certifications and sales ==
Certifications and sales for "Beautiful Liar"
Region	Certification	Certified units/sales
Australia (ARIA)	2× Platinum	140,000^{‡}
Brazil (Pro-Música Brasil)	2× Platinum	120,000^{‡}
Belgium (BRMA)	Gold	25,000^{*}
Canada (Music Canada)	Platinum	80,000^{‡}
Denmark (IFPI Danmark)	Platinum	15,000^{^}
Germany (BVMI)	Gold	150,000^{^}
Italy	—	60,000
Mexico (AMPROFON)	3× Platinum	420,000^{‡}
New Zealand (RMNZ)	Platinum	30,000^{‡}
Spain (Promusicae)	3× Platinum	60,000^{*}
Spain (Promusicae) Mastertone	3× Platinum	60,000^{*}
United Kingdom (BPI)	Platinum	603,000
United States (RIAA)	3× Platinum	3,000,000^{‡}
United States (RIAA) Mastertone	Gold	500,000^{*}
^{*} Sales figures based on certification alone.^{^} Shipments figures based on certification alone.^{‡} Sales+streaming figures based on certification alone.

== Release history ==
Release dates and formats for "Beautiful Liar"
Region	Date	Format(s)	Label(s)	Ref.
United States	February 12, 2007	Contemporary hit radio; digital download (EP); rhythmic contemporary radio; urban contemporary radio	Columbia; Music World	
Australia	March 16, 2007	Digital download	Sony BMG	
Australia	April 10, 2007	Digital download (2-track)	Sony BMG	
United Kingdom	April 13, 2007	Digital download (EP)	RCA	
United Kingdom	April 16, 2007	CD	RCA	
Germany	April 20, 2007	CD; maxi CD	Sony BMG	
Japan	May 23, 2007	CD+DVD	Sony BMG	

== See also ==
- List of Dutch Top 40 number-one singles of 2007
- List of European number-one hits of 2007
- List of number-one hits of 2007 (France)
- List of number-one hits of 2007 (Germany)
- List of number-one hits of 2007 (Italy)
- List of number-one singles of 2007 (Ireland)
- List of number-one singles in 2007 (New Zealand)
- List of number-one singles from the 2000s (UK)
- List of number-one dance singles of 2007 (U.S.)
