= Freakum Dress =

2006 song by Beyonce

Song by Beyoncé

from the album B'Day
- Released: September 4, 2006
- Recorded: 2006
- Studio: Great Divide Studios (Aspen, Colorado); Sony Music Studios (New York, NY)
- Genre: Funk; R&B
- Length: 3:20
- Label: Columbia
- Songwriters: Beyoncé Knowles; Rich Harrison; Makeba Riddick; Angela Beyincé
- Producer: Rich Harrison

Music video
- "Freakum Dress" on YouTube

"Freakum Dress" is a song by American singer Beyoncé from her second solo studio album B'Day (2006). It was written by Beyoncé, Rich Harrison, Angela Beyincé and Makeba Riddick. "Freakum Dress" received comparisons to Destiny's Child songs recorded in the 1990s. The song's production includes whistles, cymbal dominated scatter rhythms and a beat augmented by hi-hats and plinking keyboard pulses. Lyrically, Beyoncé advises women who have partners with straying eyes to put on alluring dresses and grind on other guys in dance clubs, to regain their affections.

"Freakum Dress" was generally well received by music critics who complimented Beyoncé's vocals as well as the assertiveness with which she delivers the lyrics. Many of them also noted that the beat of song melds very well with the vocal arrangement and the instruments used. The music video for the song was directed by Ray Kay, with co-direction from Beyoncé, for the B'Day Anthology Video Album (2007). It features Beyoncé dancing with women of different ages, races, and sizes. Thirty metallic dresses were designed by Tina Knowles and were used in the production. Beyoncé explained that the main reason behind shooting a video for the song was to show what a "freakum dress" looks like.

The song was part of the set lists of several of Beyoncé's worldwide tours, including The Beyoncé Experience (2007), I Am... World Tour (2009–10), and The Mrs. Carter Show World Tour (2013) as well as her 2012 revue Revel Presents: Beyoncé Live. In 2016, the song was played during an interlude on The Formation World Tour. "Freakum Dress" ranked number one on Billboard's "100 Best Deep Cuts by 21st Century Pop Stars" list.

== Recording and conception ==
Sometimes a woman feels like she needs to remind her man why he is in love with her or fancied her in the first place. All women have that freakum dress at the back of their wardrobe and they can just put it on and it will remind them."
—Beyoncé elaborating on the theme of "Freakum Dress".

"Freakum Dress" was conceived at Sony Music Studios, in New York City, when Beyoncé enlisted Harrison to co-produce for her album B'Day (2006). She and Harrison had previously collaborated on her 2003 single "Crazy in Love". She arranged for Harrison, Sean Garrett and Rodney Jerkins to be given individual rooms at the studio. In this way, Beyoncé fostered "healthy competition" between the producers by going into each of their rooms and commenting on the "great beats" the others were creating. Roger Friedman of Fox News Channel noted that "Freakum Dress" and "Suga Mama" (2006), Harrison's other contribution to B'Day "fall short of originality but mimic the Chi Lites [sic] percussion section [of "Crazy in Love"] yet again", adding, "Harrison is like the Indiana Jones of soul, constantly pulling out forgotten gems of the past for sampling [...] You can't help but think: Thank God someone wrote music in the past that can be repurposed now." Harrison coined the term "Freakum dress” for a “sassy sartorial item that can help recharge a relationship" and co-wrote the song with Beyoncé, Angela Beyincé and Makeba Riddick. In an interview with USA Today, Beyoncé talked about the content "Freakum Dress", stating that an outfit which reminds of the best moments in a couple's life, is a necessity for every woman's wardrobe.

In June 2006, Beyoncé invited Tamara Coniff of Billboard to a New York recording studio. There she premiered several songs from the album including "Ring the Alarm" (2006) and "Freakum Dress", both were cited as possible second singles although in the end it was actually "Ring the Alarm" that became B'Day's second single. Beyoncé told Coniff that "Freakum Dress" was one of her favorite songs ever.

== Music and theme ==
"Freakum Dress"
A 20-second sample of the song demonstrating the riff, and Knowles urging women to put on their "freakum dresses".

According to the sheet music published at Musicnotes.com by Hal Leonard Corporation, "Freakum Dress" is a moderate R&B song played “with a steady beat”, in common time, written in the key of F♯-Minor; the range of the composition is from a low C♯4 to F♯5. The song’s verses alternate from the chords of F♯ and C. The track also draws from the hip hop, funk, and dance-pop genres. Mike Joseph of PopMatters observed that the song shows influences by 1970s funk music, and contains limited elements of 1980s go-go. According to Phil Harrison of Time Out, "Freakum Dress" consists of a steady "long crescendo, welding galloping beats and a steamrolling two-note riff", accompanied by several genres of music, which he qualified as "multi-tracked". Spence D. of IGN Music noted that the song consists of frequent whistles as well as crashing cymbal dominated scatter rhythms and a beat which fits the "powerful, loud, confident lines" in which Beyoncé asks for the attention of her man, and urges women to have a beautiful dress to spice up their sexual life. "Freakum Dress" opens with a spoken introduction. Throughout the song, Beyoncé sings her lines in an assertive manner on melding shattering hi-hats" and plinking keyboard pulses.

According to Joseph, "Freakum Dress" is thematically similar to "Bills, Bills, Bills" (1999) and "Say My Name" (2000), from the Destiny's Child era. Ann Powers of Los Angeles Times noted that "Freakum Dress" celebrates showing off. Jon Pareles of The New York Times viewed the concept of the song as not merely having a nice wardrobe to entice men, but it also serves as "a means of self-assertion." In the song, the female protagonist pulls out her best dress to remind her potentially wandering mate of what he is leaving at home. Jody Rosen of Entertainment Weekly added that Beyoncé also seemingly gives professional advice to women on how to hold a man's attention in a long-term relationship. She sings: "I think I'm ready/ Been locked up in the house way too long / It's time to get it, [be]cause once again he's out doing wrong [...] Wear very skimpy clothes...". Joseph commented that in the song, Beyoncé is capable of wearing anything to keep her man by her side rather than dumping him. Sarah Rodman of The Boston Globe added that after having skirted her best dress, Beyoncé eyes other guys in dance clubs to make her own man jealous, in the hope of regaining his attention but she also makes sure that he really pays when he does her wrong. Beyoncé later refers to her "freakum dress" in "Jealous", a track from her fifth studio album Beyoncé (2013).

== Reception ==
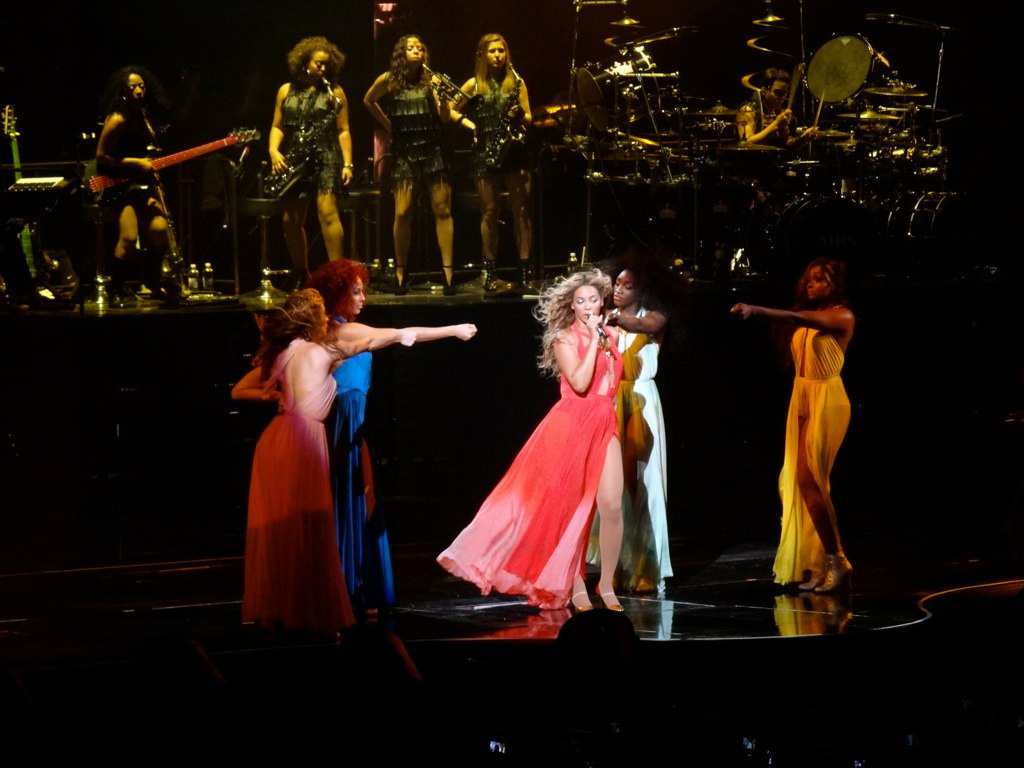
Beyoncé performing "Freakum Dress" during The Mrs. Carter Show World Tour, 2013

The song received mostly positive reviews. Phil Harrison of Time Out called "Freakum Dress" a “magnificent production” thanks to its vocal arrangements and commented that its beat can "drive the boys crazy." Brian Hiatt of Rolling Stone magazine wrote that even though "Freakum Dress" was less harmonically and melodically “produced” than songs such as "Crazy In Love" (2003), or even songs from the Destiny's Child era, it remains a “good track” due to its highly energetic beat. Jaime Gill of Yahoo! Music called the track "discordant" and "menacing", while Jon Pareles of The New York Times called it "overwrought". In a separate review, Jon Pareles said that the song will remain as one of Beyoncé's most memorable tracks thanks to its streak of rage, which is "perfectly groomed but unmistakable". Bill Lamb of About.com chose "Freakum Dress" as one of the three best songs on the entire record, and called it a “powerful, emotionally intensive and energetic track”. Caroline Sullivan of The Guardian called the song a "lighthearted crunk spree" that reminds girls of the significance of having a nice dress in their wardrobe.

Mike Joseph of PopMatters complimented the overall concept of the song, noting that the lyrics do not "radiate" enough warmth. Sal Cinquemani of Slant Magazine jokingly said that Beyoncé has added the term "Freakum Dress" "to the pop lexicon." Elysa Gardner of USA Today said that "self-assurance is evident on a tune on B'Day called 'Freakum Dress'", while another review by the staff members of the same magazine complimented the song's sexual imagery, stating "…When Ms. Bootylicious [Beyoncé] sings of squeezing that jelly into a 'Freakum Dress', the imagination runs wilder than any video would.” Darryl Sterdan, writing for the Canadian website Jam!, complimented the song's "bashing beat and irresistible chorus". Andy Kellman of AllMusic described "Freakum dress" as a "blaring and marching" track. Calling "Freakum Dress" one of the best dance tracks that Beyoncé has ever sung, Norman Mayers of Prefix Magazine chose it as one of the standout songs of the album. While reviewing B'Day, Chuck Arnold of People magazine wrote, "'…ladies' anthem 'Freakum Dress' finds Beyoncé working all her bootylicious powers over some slamming funk…". "Freakum Dress" reached number twenty-five on the US Bubbling Under Hot 100 Singles chart issue dated September 9, 2007. The same day, it also charted on the US Bubbling Under R&B/Hip-Hop Singles chart at number sixteen.

== Music video ==
=== Concept and filming ===
Beyoncé dancing in the video for "Freakum Dress", which features women of different sizes as well as ages and neon-framed mirrors in the background

The music video was co-directed by Ray Kay and Beyoncé for the B'Day Anthology Video Album, which was released the same month: it was one of eight videos shot in two weeks for the album. The choreography was done by Danielle Polanco and Jonte' Moaning, who used a 1980s retro set. Beyoncé explained the concept of the video at MTV: "It's probably the most flamboyant video, and the metallic dresses are so beautiful, they added so much color. I had to do a video for this song. Everyone wanted to know what a 'freakum dress' was, and you can't really explain it, you have to see it. Everyone has their own version, so we had so many women — of different races, sizes, shapes, ages — because we all have those dresses we pull out when we need to shut it down."

After two weeks of shooting, Beyoncé decided to call her mother Tina. The latter designed thirty dresses for the video, with eight of them for her daughter. Due to limited time, certain dress were sewed on the spot in approximately ten minutes each by taking fabric from one dress, making a slit in it, draping it and putting a belt on it. The glasses that Beyoncé wears in the video were borrowed from her make-up artist, Francesca Tolot. The video was finished in about eighteen hours of filming and it features Ebony Haith from the first cycle of America's Next Top Model. Throughout the video, Beyoncé can be seen fixing her hair in a neon mirror and is surrounded by neon-constructed doors, catwalks and podiums. It premiered on BET's 106 & Park and on American Music Channel, among others, before the release of the video anthology.

=== Synopsis and reception ===
The video begins with Beyoncé dancing in front of a target before moving to her putting on blush and lipstick next to two other men in a room full of neon framed mirrors. The men then pull a dress onto her and as the chorus begins, she walks by several women dancing on neon boxes before beginning to do a dance routine with them. As the chorus ends, she is shown surrounded by several men in a dark room and dancing in front of barcode-like walls. The video then moves to her walking down a neon catwalk. As the bridge starts, she begins doing a fierce dance routine, while constantly switching dresses. A scene is then shown with her dancers pretending to be paparazzi swarming her with microphones, before ending with Beyoncé whipping her hair in front of the target. Sal Cinquemani of Slant Magazine gave a negative review for the video, describing it as "sloppily edited". He further commented that it "plays out like a cheap fashion show for House of Deréon instead of the couture-as-weapons anthem it should be".

== Live performances ==
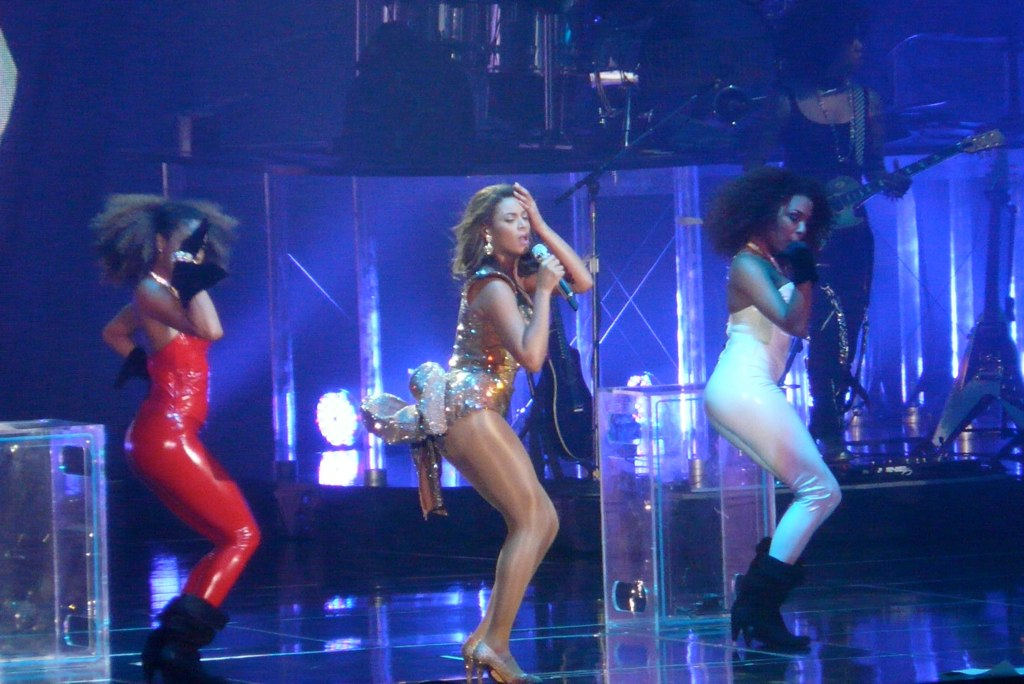
Beyoncé performing "Freakum Dress" during her I Am... World Tour, 2009

Although Beyoncé did not perform "Freakum Dress" in any televised appearances, the song was part of her set list on The Beyoncé Experience. On August 5, 2007, Beyoncé performed the song at the Madison Square Garden in Manhattan, where she directly started the song with the line: "Stop, I ain’t ready yet — wait, let me fix my hair...". Jon Pareles of The New York Times praised the performance, stating: "Beyoncé needs no distractions from her singing, which can be airy or brassy, tearful or vicious, rapid-fire with staccato syllables or sustained in curlicued melismas. But she was in constant motion, strutting in costumes [...]". Tonya Turner of The Courier-Mail reported that tracks like "Freakum Dress", "moved fans to screams of endearment". David Schmeichel of Jam! wrote that Beyoncé performed a "ballsy" version of the song. Anthony Venutolo of New Jersey On-Line wrote that Beyoncé "boiled over" during the performance of the song. It was included as the third track on Beyoncé's live album The Beyoncé Experience Live (2007).

It was also part of the set list on the I Am... World Tour. When Beyoncé performed the song in Sunrise, Florida on June 29, 2009, she was wearing a glittery gold leotard. As she sang, animated graphics of turntables, faders and other club equipment were projected behind Beyoncé, her dancers and musicians. Beyoncé was accompanied by her two drummers, two keyboardists, a percussionist, a horn section, three imposing backup vocalists called the Mamas and a lead guitarist, Bibi McGill. During the performance, she bent backwards at her guitarist's feet. Jonathon Moran of The Sunday Telegraph praised Beyoncé's dancing during the performance of the song on the I Am... World Tour. "Freakum Dress" was included as the fourth track on the deluxe edition of I Am... World Tour (2010). According to Andy Kellman of Allmusic, the performance has a "hard rock overhaul".

In May, 2012, Beyoncé performed "Freakum Dress" during her Revel Presents: Beyoncé Live revue at Revel Atlantic City. While singing the song, Beyoncé was wearing a black dress and performed a "strut-heavy footwork". Dan DeLuca from The Philadelphia Inquirer noted that "her rock moves on songs like 'Freakum Dress,' which find her facing off with a leather-jacketed lead guitarist, tend to be of the screaming-solo-played-on-a-Flying Vee variety." Ben Ratliff of The New York Times mentioned "Freakum Dress" in the "almost continuous high point" of the concert. Jim Farber of Daily News wrote that "The first, and last parts of the show stressed the steeliest Beyoncé, told in bold songs" like "Freakum Dress". Brad Wete, writing for Complex noted that Beyoncé was "wagging her bootyliciousness at the audience" while performing the song. The performance of "Freakum Dress" was included on the live album Live in Atlantic City (2013) which was filmed during the revue. In 2013 the song was a part of the set list during The Mrs. Carter Show World Tour.

== Usage in media ==
On June 24, 2009, American actress Cameron Diaz danced to "Freakum Dress" during the show It's On with Alexa Chung.

On the first episode of the eighth season of RuPaul's Drag Race All Stars, drag queens Kahanna Montrese and Aja performed the song during the “lip sync for your legacy” segment, with the latter winning.

== Credits and personnel ==
Credits are taken from B'Day liner notes.

- Vocals: Beyoncé Knowles
- Writing: Beyoncé Knowles, Rich Harrison, Makeba, Angela Beyincé
- Producing: Rich Harrison, Beyoncé Knowles
- Recording: Jim Caruana
  - Assisted by: Rob Kinelski and Jamie Rosenberg
- Mixing: Jason Goldstein & Rich Harrison
  - Assisted by: Steve Tolle

== Chart performance ==
Chart (2007)	Peak position
US Bubbling Under R&B/Hip-Hop Songs (Billboard)	16

== Certifications ==
Region	Certification	Certified units/sales
United States (RIAA)	Gold	500,000^{‡}
^{‡} Sales+streaming figures based on certification alone.
