= The Beyoncé Experience =

2007 concert tour by Beyoncé

- World tour by Beyoncé
- Promotional poster for the Oracle Arena show
- Location: Africa; Asia; Europe; North America; Oceania
- Associated album: B'Day
- Start date: April 10, 2007
- End date: November 12, 2007
- Legs: 5
- No. of shows: 96
- Attendance: 272,521 (96 shows)
- Box office: $90 million ($139.85 million in 2025 dollars)

Beyoncé concert chronology
- Verizon Ladies First Tour (2004); The Beyoncé Experience (2007); I Am... Tour (2009–10)

The Beyoncé Experience was the second concert tour by American singer Beyoncé, in support of her sophomore studio album, B'Day (2006). The Beyoncé Experience consisted of 96 shows in 2007, spread-out over five legs. Fan club tickets and VIP packages were available in early April 2007; general admission tickets were made available, officially, on April 20, 2007. The tour began that month and finished in November. Beyoncé collaborated with America's Second Harvest on a campaign for communities affected by famine, holding pre-concert food drives at every stop during the tour, and asking attendees to donate food.

Rehearsals for the tour began in March 2007; the show featured Beyoncé, her dancers, and her three backup singers being supported musically by an all-female band, Suga Mama, chosen by Beyoncé and her father, Mathew Knowles. The ten-woman ensemble, consisting of percussionists, a brass section, keyboardists and guitarists, had been selected during auditions held prior to the release of B'Day. The set list of the show included many of the songs from B'Day and Dangerously in Love (2003), plus ten edited Destiny's Child songs, as well as "Listen", originally performed and recorded by Beyoncé for the soundtrack of Dreamgirls (2006). The stage set featured large disco balls hanging from the ceiling and color-changing stairs. For the wardrobe of the tour, Beyoncé collaborated with several designers; costumes consisted of silvery and sparkly dresses, which earned praise from fashion critics.

The tour received positive reviews from music critics who praised Beyoncé's simultaneous abilities to sing live, dance in high heels, execute complex choreography and still exude high energy while on stage. The performances of the slower ballads, as well as the Destiny's Child material, were also highlighted as standouts by critics. Twenty-nine shows were submitted to Billboard's boxscore, grossing $24.9 million, with 272,521 fans attending the performances. However, during the tour, several incidents occurred; pyrotechnics, meant for the stage, injured two fans in the audience, and Beyoncé fell down a flight of stairs during a performance of "Ring the Alarm" and had a wardrobe malfunction. A show scheduled in Kuala Lumpur, Malaysia, on November 1 was relocated to Jakarta, Indonesia, due to Malaysia's strict rules against revealing clothing being worn by female performers. The performance at the Staples Center in Los Angeles was recorded on September 2, 2007, and was released on November 16, 2007, as a live DVD, The Beyoncé Experience Live.

== Background ==
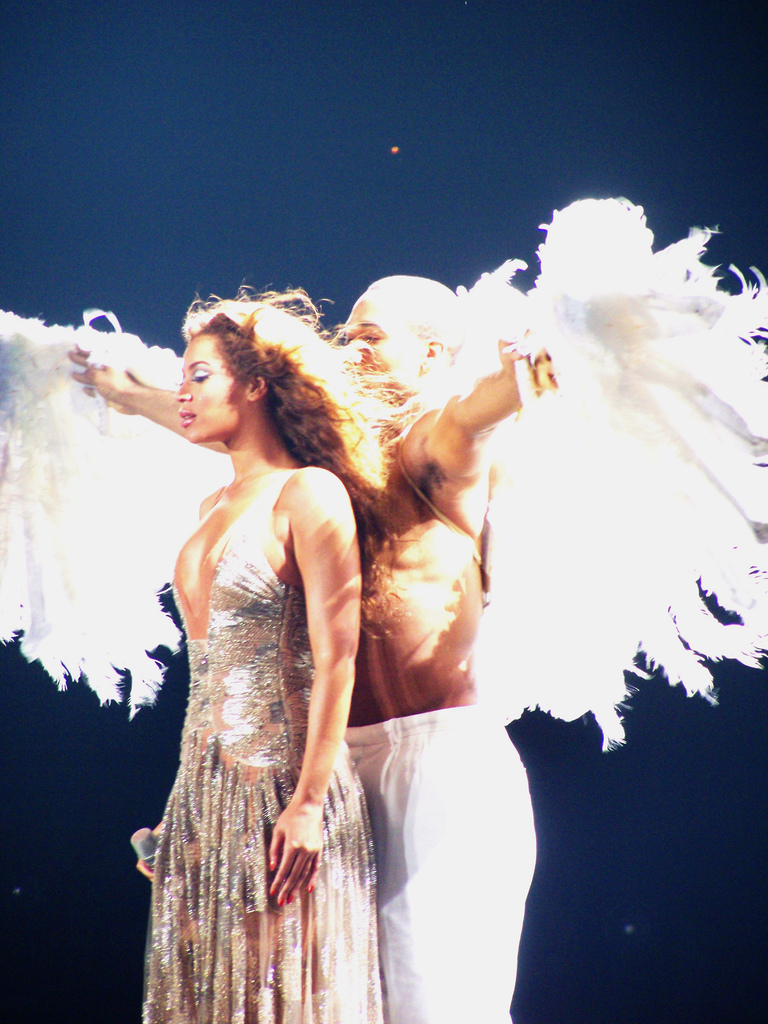
Beyoncé performing "Flaws and All" in Barcelona. During the performance she was embraced by a male dancer dressed as an angel.

Prior to the commencement of The Beyoncé Experience in support of her second solo studio album B'Day (2006), Beyoncé performed at the 2007 Houston Livestock Show and Rodeo with a guest feature from Slim Thug, who features on "Check on It"; she coined the show a "sneak preview" of The Beyoncé Experience. Fan-club tickets and VIP packages for the tour were made available for pre-order in early April on the website WeLoveBeyonce.com and the tickets officially went on sale on April 20, 2007. The tour kicked off on April 10 at the Tokyo Dome in Tokyo, Japan, with the first leg ending in Nagoya. The second leg started in Sydney, Australia and finished in the same city. Beyoncé continued with the third leg in Europe, beginning in Frankfurt, Germany, going through countries such as Spain, Sweden and Portugal, ending the leg with two dates at The Point in Dublin. The US leg of the tour began on July 6 at the Louisiana Superdome in New Orleans, as part of the 2007 New Orleans Essence Music Festival, where Beyoncé headlined. The leg also stopped in Monterrey City, Mexico and finished in Winnipeg, Canada. She then embarked on a final leg of the tour in East Asia/Korea with the final concert taking place at the Zhongshan Soccer Stadium in Taipei on November 21, 2007. The Beyoncé Experience eventually visited ninety seven venues in total.

Beyoncé teamed with America's Second Harvest and Pastor Rudy Rasmus of St. John United Methodist Church for a pre-concert food donation drive which was part of The Beyoncé Experience at every stop. Food was collected for people who fought with famine. Beyoncé's organization The Survivor Foundation was also involved in the campaign. The first 1,000 fans who would drop off a minimum of three non-perishable food items would receive an autographed photo of Beyoncé and a raffle ticket for a chance to have an upgraded seat. For the food drive in Ethiopia, India and Turkey, Houston Chronicle collaborated with Beyoncé, creating a Virtual Aid Drive and asking people to send money to them. The funds were donated to the Global FoodBanking Network.

== Development ==
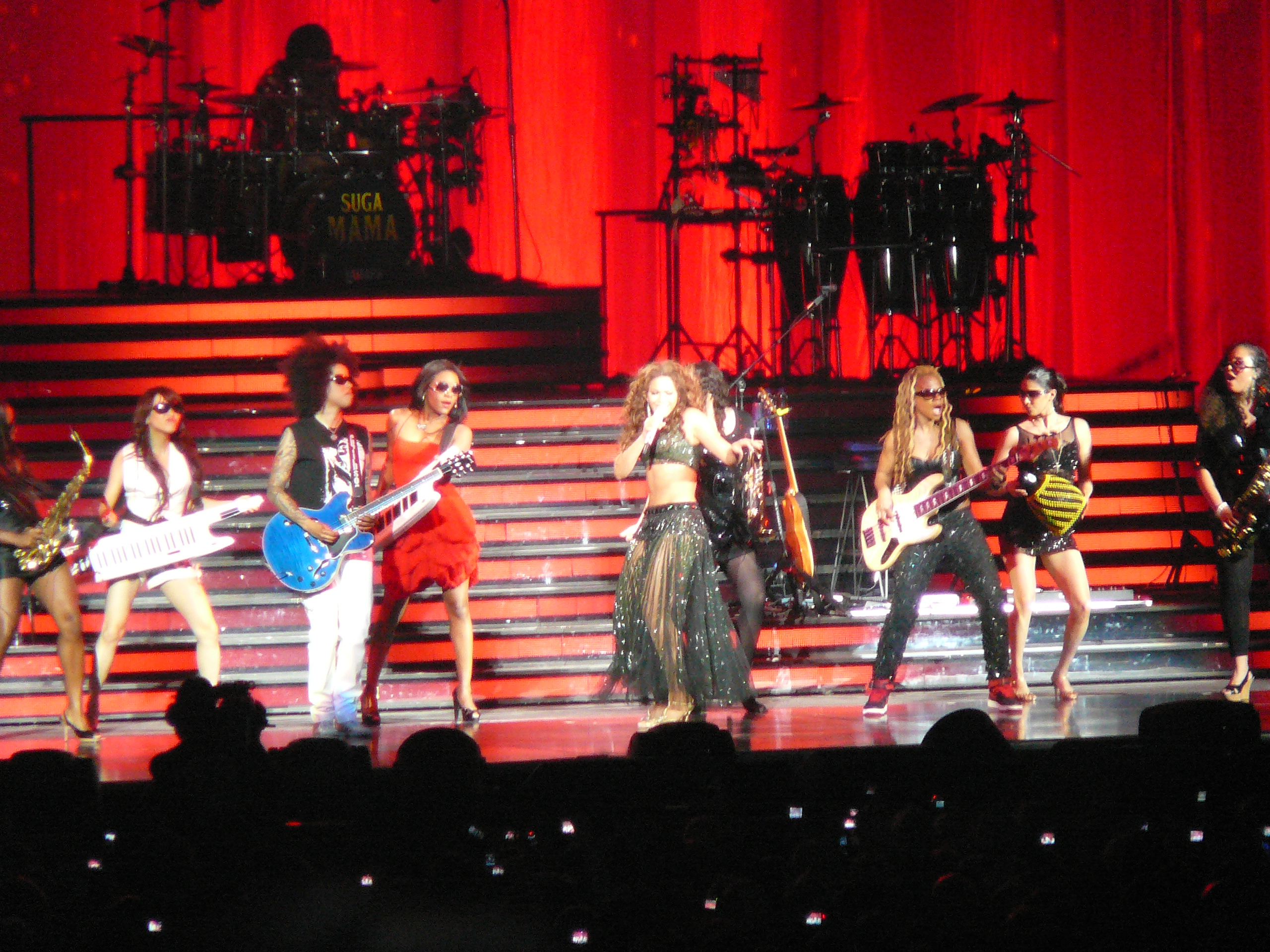
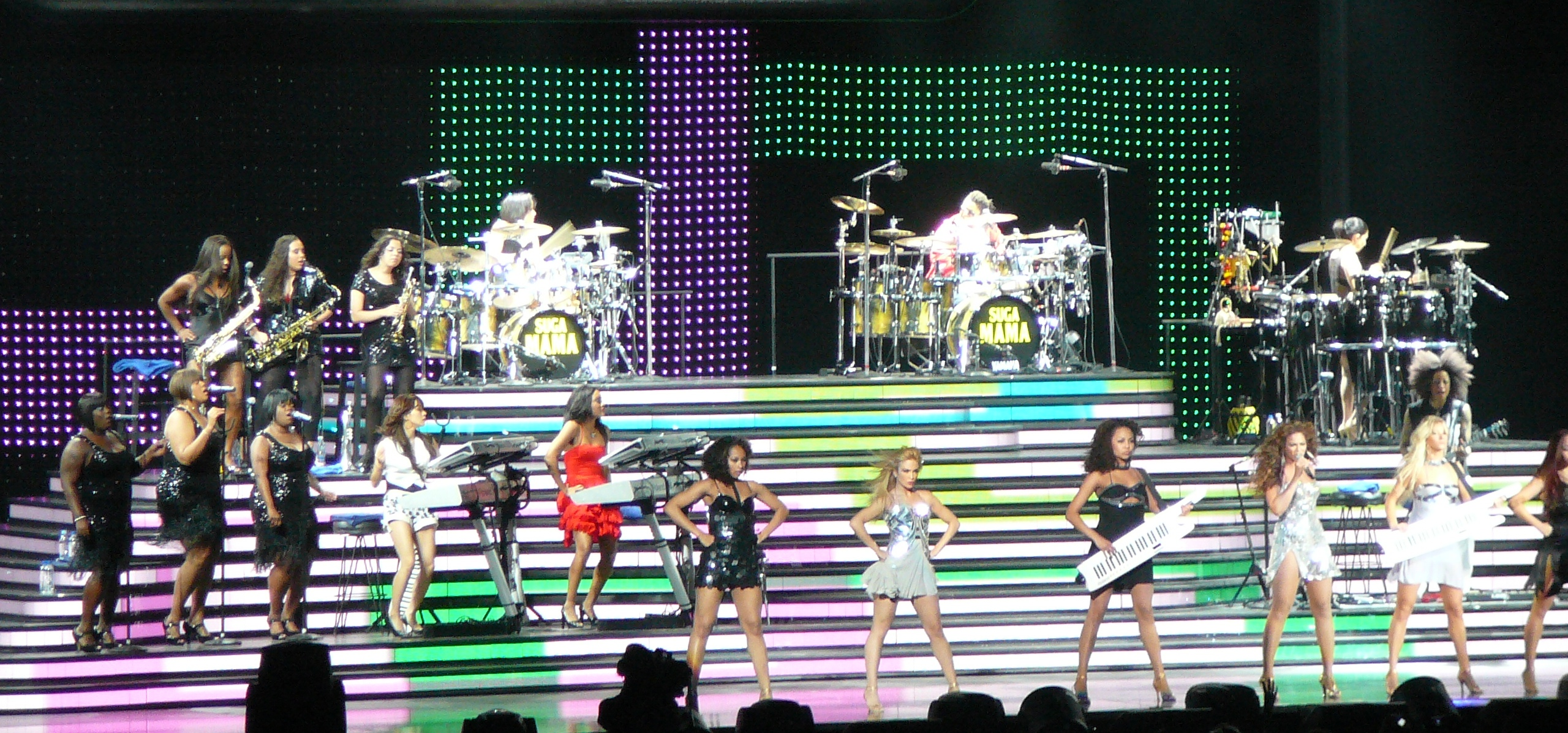
Knowles performing "Naughty Girl" (left) and "Green Light" (right) during the tour. She was backed by her all-female band, called Suga Mama who often performed solo instrumentation during her costume changes.

Early before the release of B'Day in 2006, Beyoncé held a nationwide audition for female musicians which ended in Sony Music Studios where she and her father and collaborator Mathew Knowles were among the judges. The auditions searched for keyboard players, bassists, guitarists, horn players, percussionists and drummers with stops in New Jersey, Atlanta, Burbank, Chicago and Houston. The musicians were asked to re-create the performance of "Work It Out" from the live album Live at Wembley (2004) and be able to perform at least a one-minute solo. Beyoncé stated that her goal was to get together a group of "fierce, talented, hungry, beautiful" women and form an all-female band. Speaking about her tour and the decision to form a band, Beyoncé said, "I'm all about female empowerment. I'm all about pushing the envelope. I know it's my responsibility to do something different. I said, 'I want a band, I want something different.'" She further described the process of choosing the contestants during an interview, saying: "I had worldwide auditions; people flew in from Atlanta, Houston, Israel, all over the world. It was extremely difficult [choosing the winners]. [There are] so many talented women. I wanted only a nine-piece band, but the girls were so amazing, I couldn't decide. I think I'm going to wind up having 12 people so I have two [people playing] certain instruments, because [some of the contenders] were just brilliant. It's a thing called star quality, it's a thing you can't put your finger on, can't describe. When they were playing, I said, 'I want to see y'all battle.' I brought in two of every instrument and that's how I chose. You see the one that really wants it. It was so entertaining, the energy, seeing the girls battle ... God, it was the best. It was magical." Between segments of the show, Suga Mama performed periodic instrumental interludes, with every member giving a solo so Beyoncé could change her costumes seven times. Describing them as "fantastic", Eamon Sweeney of the Irish Independent noted that "the interval music works perfectly... but two excruciating drum solos are absolutely unnecessary".

Rehearsals for the tour began in March 2007. The set list of the shows included songs from the standard and deluxe edition of B'Day as well as songs from Dangerously in Love (2003). Ten shortened versions of Destiny's Child's songs were performed, as well as "Listen", a track performed by Beyoncé on the soundtrack of the 2006 musical drama film Dreamgirls, in which Beyoncé had starred. Twenty three people were present on stage with Beyoncé: ten instrumentalists, three harmony vocalists and ten dancers, from which only four were male. Anthony Venutolo from The Star-Ledger noted that the inclusion of female persons on stage was "a simple, effective way" to underscore the theme of female empowerment showcased during the concerts. Both Venutolo and Jon Pareles of The New York Times agreed that the shows used men only as dancers for the female audience. The conception and staging for the concert was done by Beyoncé, Kim Burse and Frank Gatson Jr. Gatson, Jonte Moaning, Ramone, Anthony Burrell and Danielle Polanco choreographed the dance routines. The tour was managed by Alan Floyd and its sponsors were Samsung and L'Oréal Paris. 75 stage and crew members and 60 tons of stage equipment, most of which was lighting, were present for the tour. 38 Sennheiser wireless channels were used for the shows and in a different frequency range, 38 backup wireless channels. The engineering team comprised James Berry who handled monitors for the band, Ramón Morales for Beyoncé, and Horace Ward at front of house. Sixteen of the wireless channels were devoted to personal monitor systems: 11 in stereo and five in mono. Beyoncé and the rest of the band members had a Sennheiser EK 300 IEM G2 monitoring receiver. Eleven of the channels provided wireless instrument support for guitar, bass and horns, using Sennheiser SK 500 G2 bodypack transmitters. The remaining channels covered Beyoncé's vocal microphone and those of her backup singers and guest vocalists. Sennheiser EM 3032-U and EM 550 G2 true-diversity receivers with Sennheiser A 5000-CP antennas and AC 3000 combiners rounded out the system. Beyoncé sang through a nickel Sennheiser SKM 5200 transmitter outfitted with a Neumann KK 105-S capsule. Ward commented that The KK 105-S was an "absolutely stunning microphone... [it] is beautifully smooth and captures every nuance of a talented vocalist's performance". He specified Sennheiser SKM 935 G2 microphones for the backup and guest vocalists because they sounded "excellent even under less-than-ideal conditions".

=== Costume design ===
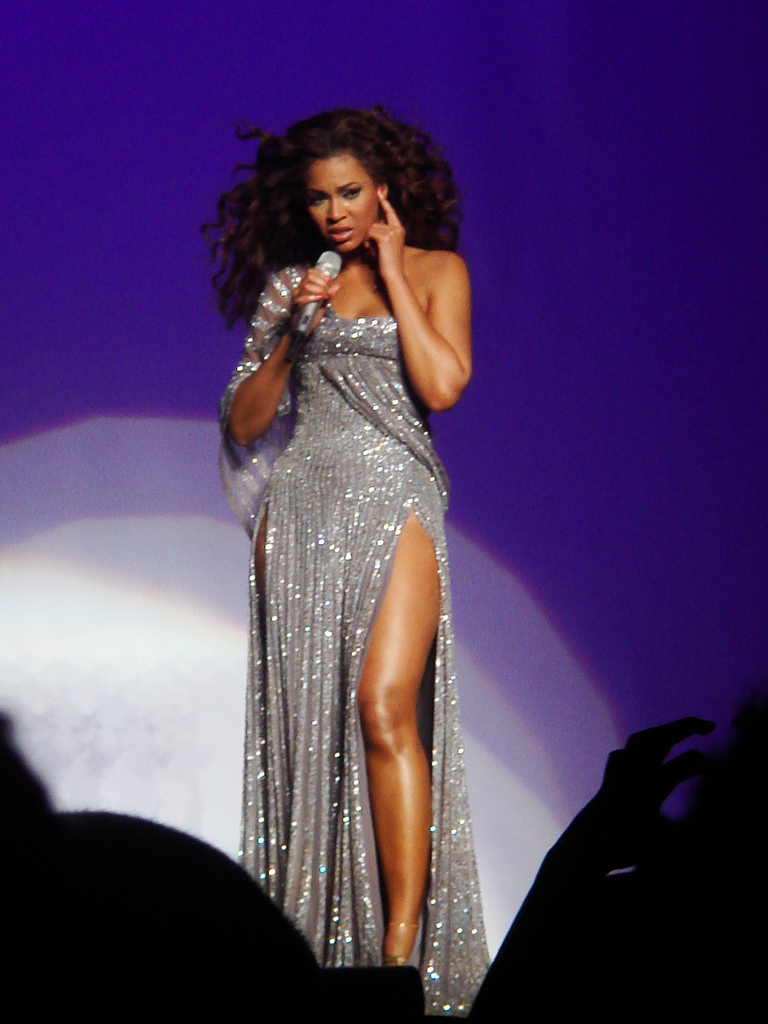
Knowles performing during The Beyoncé Experience dressed in sparkly and silvery dresses. The wardrobe of the tour received positive reception from critics, many of whom praised her overall look.

Beyoncé's mother and designer Tina Knowles, House of Deréon, Giorgio Armani, Versace, Elie Saab and Herve Leger served as the designers for the outfits of the tour. Jon Pareles of The New York Times described the clothes as mainly silvery, ranging from miniskirts to formal dresses, flesh-toned bodysuit to bikini to negligee. Pareles further noted that "The wardrobe entices men, but it's also a means of self-assertion". J. Freedom du Lac of The Washington Post described the costumes during the show as "spangly". Lee Hildebrand of the San Francisco Chronicle praised the costumes saying that "every one [is] fabulously glamorous, most of them tailored to highlight the singer's ample cleavage and a pair of legs to rival Tina Turner's. At one point, when the legs were concealed by a long scarlet gown, wind blew from underneath to expose them."

Sarah Rodman of The Boston Globe praised the floor-length gown but disliked the tinfoil mini worn by Beyoncé. Lisnaree Vichitsorasatra of The Nation praised Beyoncé's look, saying that she was like a "glittering goddess in a revealing outfit". Frank Scheck of The Hollywood Reporter also echoed her statements, "to say that Beyonce looks terrific is probably redundant. Her fashion parade of form-fitting, eye-catching costumes – most notably a belly dancer's get-up in which she demonstrated some hip-shaking moves that indicated Shakira better watch her back – provided ample opportunities for shameless leering." Ann Powers of the Los Angeles Times commented that "the camouflage outfits her male dancers sometimes wore... felt right for a show that sometimes seemed like a military operation, expertly executed." Irish Independent's Eamon Sweeney noted that Beyoncé looked "absolutely stunning" and added, "I have to confess that the sight of Beyoncé ripping off a short cocktail dress to reveal a barely there bodysuit will linger in my memory for years to come." A writer of The StarPhoenix wrote that Beyoncé looked like a "silver-clad siren rose" further saying that "it was almost surreal to see the woman who frequents the covers of fashion magazines in the same room". Tonya Turner from The Courier-Mail praised Beyoncé for looking "every bit the dream girl in a sparkling silver floor-length gown".

== Concert synopsis ==
The show included many references such as to James Brown and Donna Summer as well as routines inspired by Sweet Charity and Marilyn Monroe. It opened in darkness, with Beyoncé emerging through a hole in the stage amidst smoke, sparkles and pyrotechnics to perform "Crazy in Love" with a snippet of Gnarls Barkley's "Crazy" in a sparkling silver gown and walking to the front of the stage, as fifteen disco balls hung from the ceiling. Her background band started playing the music to the funk song and while singing, Beyoncé walked up a huge staircase which moved forward in two places where her all-female band and three backup singers were positioned. At the top of the staircase/mini-stage, she tore off the bottom of her dress and walked back down to the main stage. Her three backup singers came down as well and did the "uh-oh" dance from the song with her.

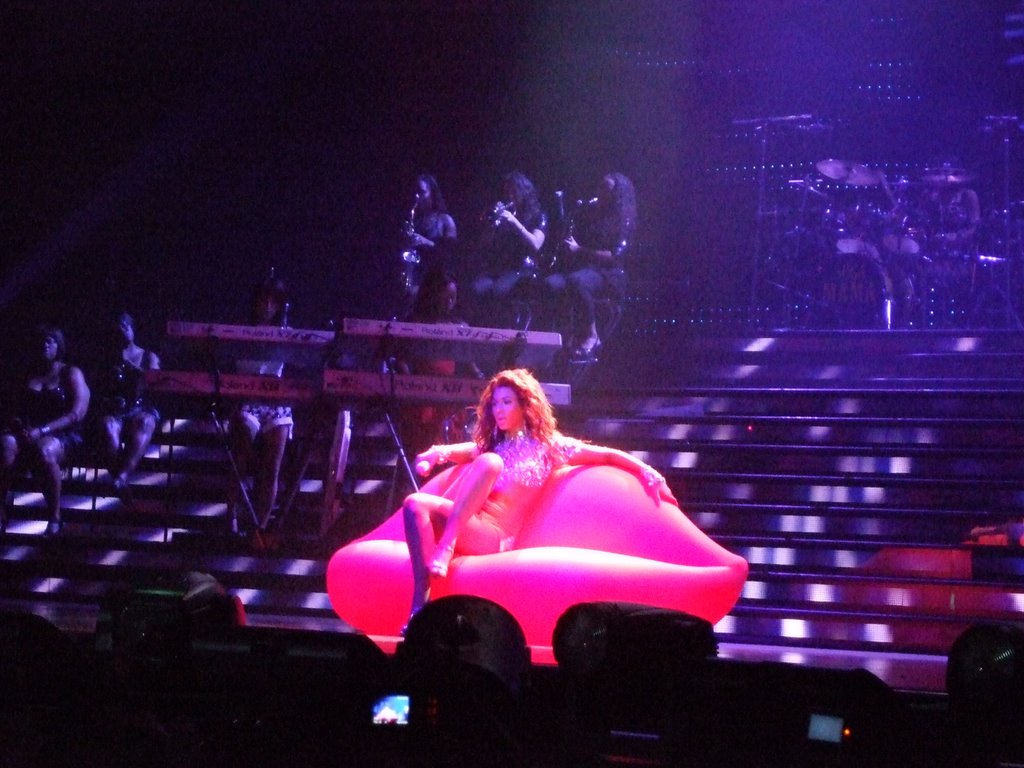
Beyoncé performing "Speechless" during the tour while seated on a sofa designed like a pair of lips. Lee Hildebrand of the San Francisco Chronicle noted that the singer was "particularly powerful on 'Speechless,' a masterpiece of lyrical minimalism".

During "Freakum Dress" Beyoncé played an air guitar, while the stage's stairs were lit green during "Green Light" which she performed with six female dancers. She wore a belly-dancing outfit, including harem pants, while singing "Baby Boy". She descended the staircase holding an umbrella and was met by three guys wearing fatigues. A short section of the reggae classic "Murder She Wrote" was incorporated into "Baby Boy". During "Beautiful Liar", Beyoncé sang into a microphone that fell from the ceiling and performed a Shakira-styled dance similar to the song's music video; Shakira appeared on the video screen throughout the song. "Naughty Girl" was also sung with Donna Summer's "Love to Love You Baby" being incorporated and while performing she belly-danced on the song's beat. "Me, Myself and I" was performed at a slower tempo than the original recording, after which Beyoncé sang "Dangerously in Love 2" with a snippet of "He Loves Me" by Jill Scott. She cried during "Flaws and All" and showed her "imperfections" before being embraced by a dancer dressed as an angel. During the performance of the song, she sang wide-eyed in a video close-up. The show continued with Beyoncé performing a ten-song Destiny's Child medley which contained female solidarity-themed songs. Beyoncé sang "Speechless" while seated on a sofa designed like a pair of lips.

The intro to "Ring the Alarm" paid homage to the "Cell Block Tango" from the film Chicago, as women told of how they had been hurt by men and the performance saw Beyoncé wearing a red overcoat. During "Suga Mama", Beyoncé performed a pole dance. Afterwards Beyoncé's duets with Jay-Z, "Upgrade U" and "'03 Bonnie & Clyde", were performed. During "Get Me Bodied" she removed the robot costume she was previously sporting to reveal a black and yellow dress to emulate a bee, and further led the crowd in a dance routine. "Check on It" was preceded by an instrumental of "The Pink Panther Theme", during which the stairs were colored pink. A Dreamgirls segment was performed, incorporating the title song and "Listen" from the 2006 musical film in which Beyoncé starred in. The final song on the tour's set list was "Irreplaceable"; it began with the audience singing the first verse to Beyoncé after she announced "I've been singing my heart out for over two hours. Now it's time for you to sing for me." Beyoncé asked from the crowd to sing along her during the song while video clips of the backing musicians showed them making the "to the left" motion which was a key part of the song. Confetti were also dropped on the stage. As the concert ended, Beyoncé was walking on the stage and pointing to individual fans saying "I see you!" and describing their clothes or the signs they held.

== Critical reception ==
"As notable as the supporting cast was, it rarely drew attention away from the star. The show is called 'The Beyonce Experience,' and it lived up to its name, with Beyonce leaving no doubt of her all-around talent. She can sing with the power of a Tina Turner, dance with the military precision of a Janet Jackson, and dress with the over-the-top flair of a Cher. More than just a concert, it's a state-of-the-art arena spectacle – the best that 2007 has offered, so far."

— Anthony Venutolo of The Star-Ledger in his review of the tour

Entertainment Weekly's Chris Willman awarded the show an A− rating, and commended Beyoncé's ability to sing and dance simultaneously. Similarly, Shaheem Reid of MTV News commented, "There are few (very few) ladies out there who can really sing, a lot who can dance, a lot more who look good — but really no other who can combine all three and add iconic star power like Miss Beyoncé, arguably the best all-around stage performer in the game right now." J. Freedom du Lac of The Washington Post praised the concert's fast pace and called it a "pure pop spectacle" further describing it as "brilliant... [and] fiery". He noted that the opening, was with a "dramatic, over-the-top entrance about which every aspiring diva dreams", but however he was disappointed in the show's ending. He further wrote, "Though Beyoncé owned the spotlight, this being her 'Experience' and all, her band co-starred in the show, playing hard and tight behind the singer and vamping expertly for sustained periods whenever Beyoncé left the stage to change." Sarah Rodman of The Boston Globe wrote in her review that the tour title reminded her of a concert theme park rid and added "[it] was an elaborate affair. It was part Vegas review, part hard-edged rock concert, part sweaty funk and soul revival, part diva concert hall performance, and almost all fun to watch as the singer threw herself into the various settings and costumes". Eamon Sweeney from the Irish Independent described Beyoncé's performance as "the best pop show on the planet" adding that the title of the tour "does exactly what it says on the tin". David Schmeichel of Jam! wrote that the "Splashy Beyonce 'experience' gives a lesson in diva-hood for pop princesses everywhere", further praising her "goddess" like entrance, vocals and performance which he described as "tightly scripted as her film forays". Ashante Infantry of the Toronto Star noted that the concerts served as a testament to Beyoncé's talent and power and compared her with Prince for the versatility and musicianship and Tina Turner for the sass and sheer power. Herald Sun's Cameron Adams also compared Beyoncé's performing ability to that of Prince, and stated, "Beyoncé is an old-fashioned, all- round entertainer." Jim Harrington writing for San Jose Mercury News graded the tour as an A-plus affair. A writer of The StarPhoenix praised the show, writing that Beyoncé "set the stage on fire" for two hours. The writer also added that she had "an honest, God-given talent she's not afraid to share. Her songs, ranging from sultry to soulful were performed with all her heart... With a clear passion for showmanship and a voice not easily matched, Beyonce simply bypassed the mediocrity of most concerts and took her performance to another level." Arielle Castillo of Miami New Times heavily praised Beyoncé's performance, writing that "B performed like her life depended on it; fresh to death choreography, flawless vocals, crazysexy wardrobe and her trademark lioness mane all in A+ form... Beyonce gave the crowd all that they expected, and multiplied that by 1000." She concluded her review by writing that the concert was reminiscent of a Las Vegas show due to the elaborate costumes, sets, and "over-the-topness of the whole thing" further praising Beyoncé for acting, dancing and singing on stage.

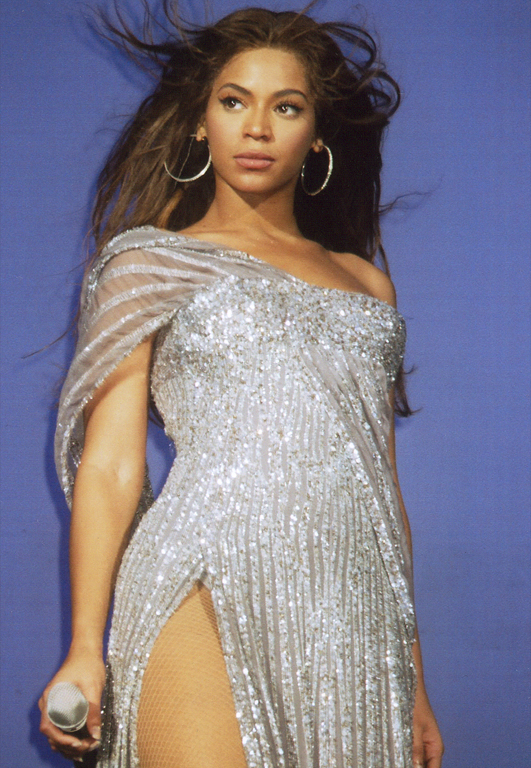
Beyoncé performing "Listen", a song from the soundtrack album Dreamgirls: Music from the Motion Picture.

The New York Times' Jon Pareles wrote, "She's the woman with everything: the voice, the moves, the songs, the ideas and the clothes. Her two-hour set was a brilliant pop extravaganza that kept the songs at its center." He further noted that Beyoncé didn't need distractions from her singing, "which can be airy or brassy, tearful or vicious, rapid-fire with staccato syllables or sustained in curlicued melismas. But she was in constant motion". Lee Hildebrand of the San Francisco Chronicle gave a very positive review for the concert and noted that Beyoncé performed "two fast-paced hours of terrific singing, solid musicianship, spectacular staging and some of the most imaginative choreography ever to have graced the stage of Oracle Arena." Hildebrand further noted that Beyoncé used "occasional bits of rasp to her ringing mezzo tones to emphasize key lines" while performing the ballads. He wrote that every "twitch, turn, slide and hip shake was in perfect sync" and praised the singer's constant motion most of the time which never left her "out of breath". While reviewing Beyoncé's concert in Bangkok, Thailand, Lisnaree Vichitsorasatra of The Nation praised her dancing which included "shaking, bouncing and belly dancing, mixed with hip-hop" further comparing it with Shakira's. She further noted that the highlight of the show was when Beyoncé sang the slow-tempo ballads. The Courier Mail's Tonya Turner praised Beyoncé's "passionate and fiery" performance accompanied by "frantic booty popping and sexy R&B moves". Writing for the Los Angeles Times, Ann Powers noted that the tour was one of the "modern superstar spectacles that casts the artist's reality onto the level of myth". However, she noted, that "Beyoncé'ss 'Experience' plays off the performer's well-known struggles and triumphs to build a story that will make fans both gawk and relate. The maddening thing about this dazzling entertainment, though, is that the tale it tells is partly the wrong one." She concluded the review by saying, "Beyoncé is electric in concert yet reined in by her show's post-feminist theme. Why not just let it be about her musical prowess?". Jim Farber of the New York Daily News praised Beyoncé's energy and powerful performance on stage, writing "With her triumphant gait, statuesque figure and steely stare, the singer seemed primed not just to perform but to vanquish... Beyoncé sang with a fiery determination, stressing cries and shouts that had no use for subtlety and even less for vulnerability. She danced at an equally mad clip... hitting every mark with a vengeance... A Beyoncé show... has everything to do with power and nothing to do with nuance. It's the kind of thing meant to inspire awe, not intimacy... She sang her songs last night with the force of a rapper, stressing pieces from her two solo albums in a way that made every sound seem percussive." However, Farber criticized the unsure repertoire of songs performed, writing "Many of her tunes prove too skittish to sink in, and some of her rhythms are too robotic to find a groove." Scheck of The Hollywood Reporter noted that the snippets of other artists that Beyoncé included in her own songs were refreshing and included the fast-paced Destiny's Child medley and the performances of "Get Me Bodied" and "Listen" as highlights of the show. He further noted,

"It's not for nothing that they call this show 'The Beyonce Experience.' Like the summer blockbuster movies crowding theater screens, this tour by the pop/R&B icon resembles not so much a concert as a series of thrillingly staged set pieces. It's safe to say that her fans will not be disappointed by the two-hour extravaganza. From the diva-style opening, when she rises from beneath the stage amidst a blinding sparkler display, to the final audience sing-along on the female-empowering hit 'Irreplaceable,' the star delivers a crowd-pleasing spectacle that offers as much visual as musical stimulation."

== Commercial performance ==
In October 2009, when Beyoncé was chosen for the Woman of the Year Award presented by Billboard magazine, a partial gross of the tour was revealed. Between April 21 and September 8, 2007, it was reported to the magazine that The Beyoncé Experience grossed $24.9 million and 272,521 fans attended the twenty nine shows which were submitted to the boxscore at that time. The highest-grossing concert of the tour was at the Madison Square Garden in New York City, New York with $2,744,345. The concert that garnered the most number of attendees was at Fort Bonifacio in Taguig, Philippines on November 7, 2007, with total of 70,000 people in attendance.

== Incidents and cancelled shows ==
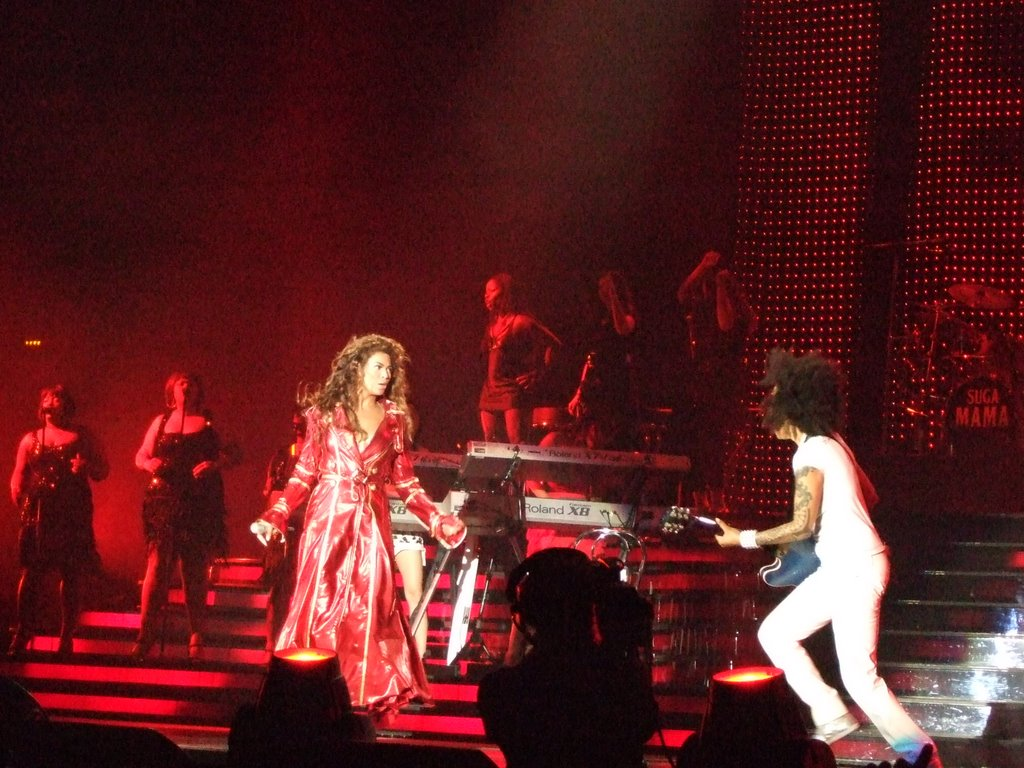
Beyoncé performing "Ring the Alarm" in May 2007. During a performance of the song in Orlando, Florida on July 24, she fell down a flight of stairs as her long red coat got caught under her heel.

On July 8, 2007, during the concert in St. Louis, two people in the audience suffered burns after pyrotechnics, meant for the stage effects, tumbled into the audience; Beyoncé visited them in the hospital after the show. During the performance of "Ring the Alarm”, at the Orlando, Florida show on July 24, Beyoncé fell down a flight of stairs. Her heel got caught in the bottom of her long coat, and she tripped down the steps; she quickly picked herself up and carried on with the show. After the incident, Beyoncé jokingly asked the audience not to "post the footage on YouTube", although she knew they would; several clips were posted on the then-new video-sharing website, subsequently going viral. On July 26, YouTube removed many of the clips as they were in violation of copyright infringement. After an initial removal spree, clips of the incident reappeared on YouTube, and were uploaded to other content-sharing websites such as Dailymotion and eBaum's World. A spokesperson for the singer said she was not injured during the fall, which she described as a "mere spot on an otherwise sensational, flawless show" adding, "Miss Beyoncé picked herself right up, without missing a beat, showing to all that she is the best." When asked about the fall on CNN, Beyoncé said that she hit her head and chin and was "bruised-up". She further noted that she immediately started thinking to get up and continue performing the show "harder" as "an athlete" due to the adrenaline rush she experienced. "Whenever I do something like that, I always perform really, really hard, cause it makes me a little mad at myself; so I just go crazy. So they got a really good show, in the end." During her August 15 performance in Toronto, while performing "Déjà Vu", Beyoncé had a wardrobe malfunction when her dress flew over her head and was rumored to have revealed her breast. However, a spokesperson for the singer revealed that the speculations weren't true, because "She's wearing a flesh-tone bra! Do you really think Beyoncé would go on stage like that?" The video, which was uploaded to YouTube, went viral. Powers of the Los Angeles Times discussed the incidents, saying, "As a pop queen, Beyoncé is almost too perfect. A tumble down the stairs onstage in Orlando and a subsequent 'wardrobe malfunction' in Toronto garnered far more attention than was warranted partly because these mistakes contradicted her fiercely athletic style." Beyoncé's concert in Addis Ababa, Ethiopia on October 20, 2007, was special as it was a part of the country's year-long celebration of its 2,000th year of independence (according to the Coptic calendar). After the final song of the two-hour set had been performed, Beyoncé gathered all of her dancers and band members on stage. The concert was finished off with the entire ensemble leading the crowd in jumping, singing and dancing to Teddy Afro's iconic New Year's anthem "Abebayehosh", which the audience was visibly thrilled over. At the end of the concert, Beyoncé stated "I want to thank you. You have been one of the best audiences of my lifetime."

Beyoncé intended to take The Beyoncé Experience to Kuala Lumpur, Malaysia on November 1, 2007; however the show was cancelled "due to a scheduling conflict" and relocated to Jakarta, Indonesia. It was speculated, by several publications, that Beyoncé moved the show because of Malaysia's strict Islam-based laws surrounding the clothing that females in public, and female performers, can wear. The government demanded for female performers to cover up from the top of their chests to their knees, including their shoulders. Several publications reported that the news followed an uptick in protests by several conservative groups, including the nearly 10,000-strong National Union of Malaysian Muslim Students, urging the Ministry of Culture, Arts and Heritage to stop the concert from taking place. The statement addressed by Beyoncé's management team stated that the show was cancelled "with regret". The show on October 24 in Istanbul, Turkey was cancelled by the organizer, the sports club Fenerbahçe, due to attacks of Kurdistan Workers' Party in Hakkâri on September 21, 2007.

== Broadcasting and recordings ==
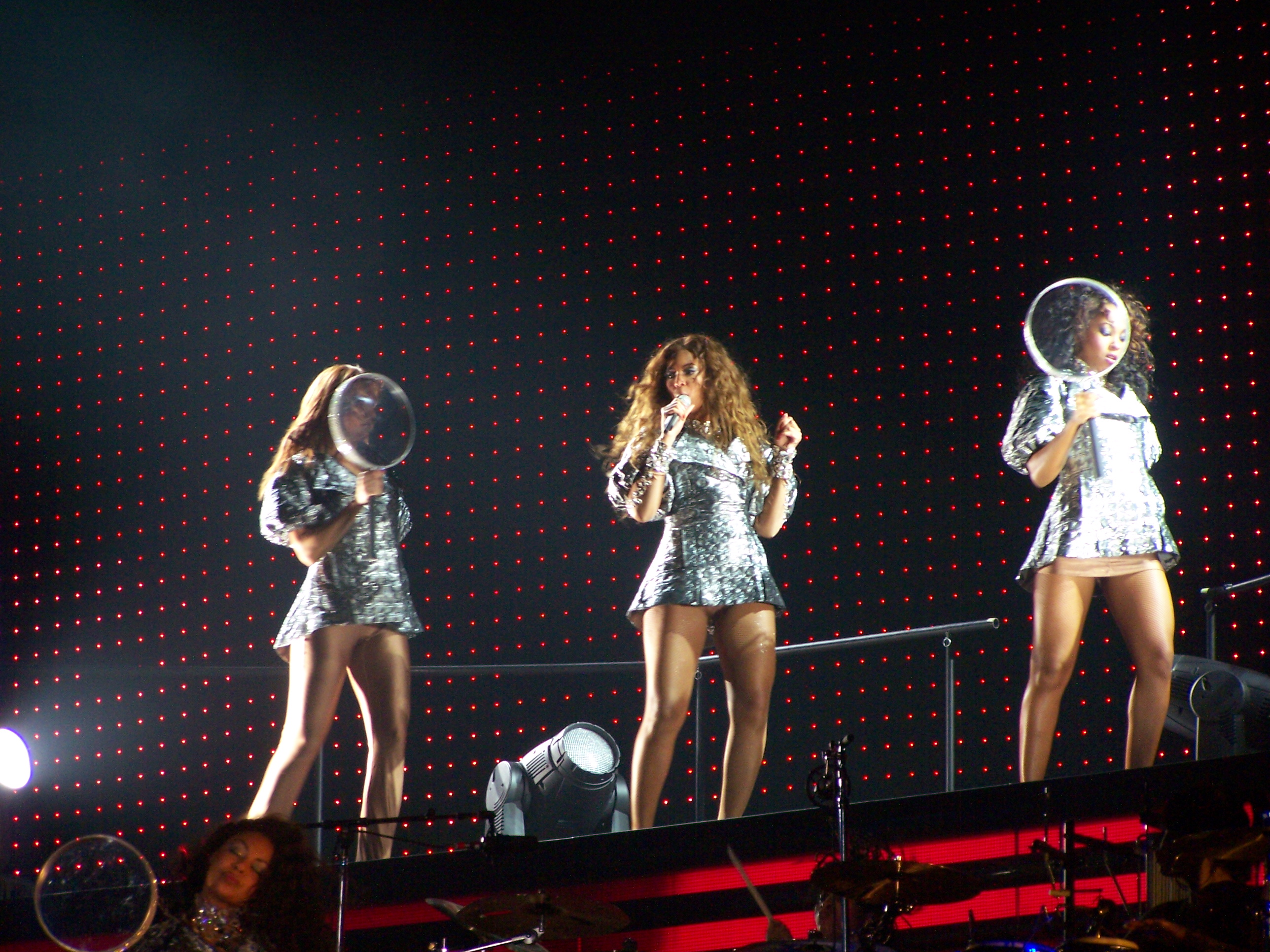
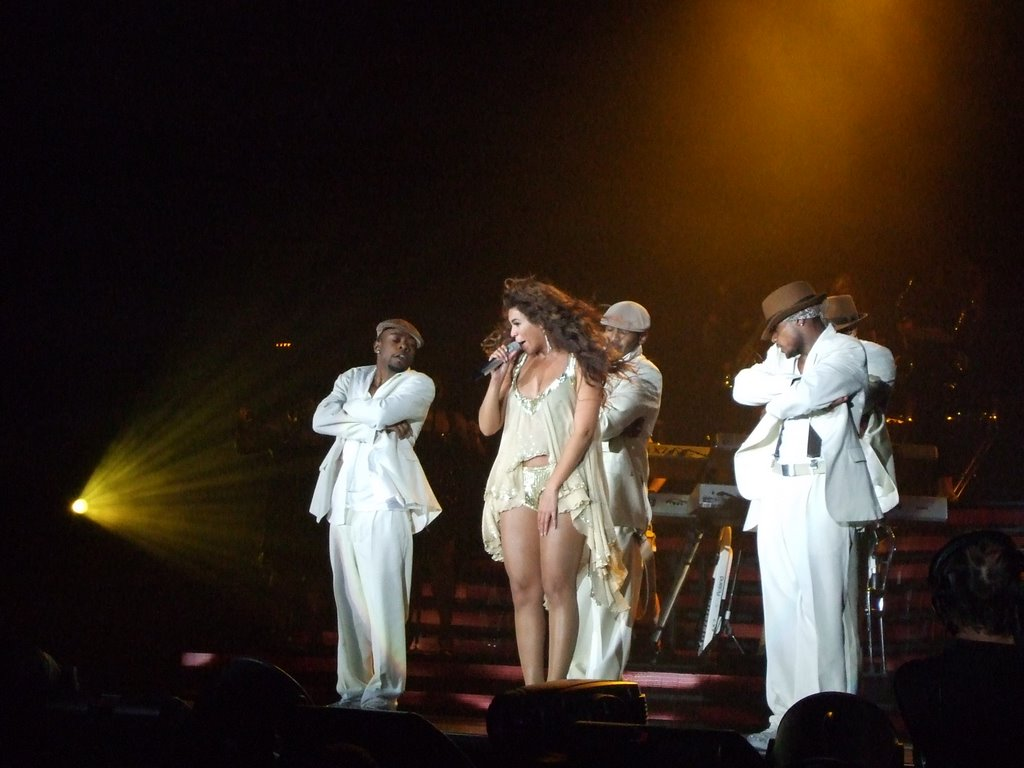
Knowles performing "Independent Women" with her female background dancers (left) and "Upgrade U" with several male background dancers (right). Her dancing abilities during the shows of the tour received praise from critics.

The show on September 2 at the Staples Center in Los Angeles, two days prior to Beyoncé's 26th birthday was filmed and later released as a DVD titled The Beyoncé Experience Live. During the show, Destiny's Child bandmates Kelly Rowland and Michelle Williams appeared onstage to finish singing "Survivor"; Jay-Z also contributed his verse to "Upgrade U". At the end of the show Rowland and Williams led the audience in singing "Happy Birthday to You" to Beyoncé, to mark her birthday two days later. It was released on November 20, 2007, worldwide through Columbia Records. The Beyoncé Experience Live was shown at ninety-six cinemas across the United States on November 19, 2007, one day before its DVD release. Black Entertainment Television (BET) broadcast the show on Thanksgiving Day on November 22, 2007 and later on December 18 the same year. It was also broadcast to members of the United States Army serving in the Iraq War through AEG Network and 3sat aired the concert in Germany, Austria and Switzerland on December 31, 2008. The DVD was commercially successful earning five certifications in different countries, including 3× Platinum by the Recording Industry Association of America for selling 300,000 copies. The performance of "Irreplaceable" during the concert in Madrid was broadcast on the 2007 ALMA Awards through the American Broadcasting Company.

== Opening acts ==
- Chris Brown (Australia)
- Lemar (Europe)
- Katy Shotter (selected dates in the UK and the US)
- Robin Thicke (selected dates in North America)
- Sean Kingston (selected dates in North America)
- Pekaso (Philippines)
- Ludacris (Ethiopia)

== Set list ==
The following set list is obtained from the September 2, 2007 show in Los Angeles. It is not intended to represent all dates throughout the tour.

1. "Crazy in Love" (contains elements of "Crazy")
2. "Freakum Dress"
3. "Green Light"
4. "Baby Boy" (contains elements of "Murder She Wrote", "Lost Ones" and "Ring the Alarm")
5. "Beautiful Liar"
6. "Naughty Girl"
7. "Me, Myself, and I"
8. "Dangerously in Love 2" (contains elements of "He Loves Me (Lyzel In E Flat)")
9. "Flaws and All"
10. "Destiny's Child Medley":
  1. "Independent Women Part 1"
  2. "Bootylicious"
  3. "No, No, No (Part 2)"
  4. "Bug a Boo"
  5. "Bills, Bills, Bills"
  6. "Cater 2 U"
  7. "Say My Name"
  8. "Jumpin', Jumpin'"
  9. "Soldier" (contains elements of "Crank That (Soulja Boy)")
  10. "Survivor"
11. "Speechless"
12. "Ring the Alarm"
13. "Suga Mama"
14. "Upgrade U"
15. "'03 Bonnie & Clyde"
16. "Check on It"
17. "Déjà Vu"
18. "Get Me Bodied"
19. "Welcome to Hollywood" (intermission)
20. "Deena"
21. "Listen"

Encore

1. "Irreplaceable"

=== Notes ===
- "Work It Out" was performed during performances in Japan and Australia instead of "Beautiful Liar".
- During European and Australian leg, and in Monterrey concert Déjà Vu was performed as the encore. Additionally, it was performed after "Check on It" during the North American leg.
- During the Madrid and Monterrey concerts, Beyoncé began the performance with the Spanish version of "Irreplaceable", titled "Irreemplazable".

== Tour dates ==
List of concerts; showing date, city, country, venue
Date (2007)	City	Country	Venue
April 10	Tokyo	Japan	Tokyo Dome
April 11	Osaka	Japan	Osaka-Jo Hall
April 12	Osaka	Japan	Osaka-Jo Hall
April 14	Nagoya	Japan	Aichi Prefectural Gymnasium
April 21	Sydney	Australia	Acer Arena
April 22	Brisbane	Australia	Brisbane Entertainment Centre
April 24	Adelaide	Australia	Adelaide Entertainment Centre
April 25	Melbourne	Australia	Rod Laver Arena
April 26	Sydney	Australia	Acer Arena
April 30	Frankfurt	Germany	Festhalle Frankfurt
May 1	Stuttgart	Germany	Hanns-Martin-Schleyer-Halle
May 3	Stockholm	Sweden	Stockholm Globe Arena
May 4	Hamar	Norway	Vikingskipet
May 5	Aalborg	Denmark	Gigantium
May 7	Munich	Germany	Olympiahalle
May 8	Vienna	Austria	Wiener Stadthalle
May 9	Zürich	Switzerland	Hallenstadion
May 10	Milan	Italy	DatchForum
May 12	Bielefeld	Germany	Seidensticker Halle
May 13	Berlin	Germany	Max-Schmeling-Halle
May 14	Hamburg	Germany	Color Line Arena
May 16	Paris	France	Palais Omnisports de Paris-Bercy
May 17	Oberhausen	Germany	König Pilsener Arena
May 18	Rotterdam	Netherlands	Rotterdam Ahoy
May 19	Antwerp	Belgium	Sportpaleis
May 24	Lisbon	Portugal	Pavilhão Atlântico
May 26	Madrid	Spain	Palacio de Deportes de la Comunidad de Madrid
May 27	Barcelona	Spain	Palau Sant Jordi
May 29	Marseille	France	Le Dôme de Marseille
May 30	Lyon	France	Halle Tony Garnier
June 1	Birmingham	England	National Indoor Arena
June 2	London	England	Wembley Arena
June 3	London	England	Wembley Arena
June 5	Cardiff	Wales	Cardiff International Arena
June 6	Nottingham	England	Nottingham Arena
June 7	Manchester	England	Manchester Evening News Arena
June 9	Dublin	Ireland	Point Theatre
June 10	Dublin	Ireland	Point Theatre
July 6	New Orleans	United States	Louisiana Superdome
July 7	Memphis	United States	FedExForum
July 8	St. Louis	United States	Scottrade Center
July 11	Monterrey	Mexico	Arena Monterrey
July 13	Dallas	United States	American Airlines Center
July 14	Houston	United States	Toyota Center
July 15	San Antonio	United States	AT&T Center
July 18	Nashville	United States	Sommet Center
July 20	Atlanta	United States	Philips Arena
July 21	Tampa	United States	St. Pete Times Forum
July 22	Sunrise	United States	Bank Atlantic Center
July 24	Orlando	United States	Amway Arena
July 27	Hampton	United States	Hampton Coliseum
July 28	Raleigh	United States	RBC Center
July 29	Charlotte	United States	Charlotte Bobcats Arena
July 31	Albany	United States	Times Union Center
August 1	Uncasville	United States	Mohegan Sun Arena
August 3	East Rutherford	United States	Continental Airlines Arena
August 4	New York City	United States	Madison Square Garden
August 5	New York City	United States	Madison Square Garden
August 8	Baltimore	United States	1st Mariner Arena
August 9	Washington, D.C.	United States	Verizon Center
August 10	Philadelphia	United States	Wachovia Center
August 11	Atlantic City	United States	Etess Arena
August 12	Boston	United States	TD Banknorth Garden
August 14	Montreal	Canada	Bell Centre
August 15	Toronto	Canada	Air Canada Centre
August 17	Auburn Hills	United States	The Palace of Auburn Hills
August 18	Chicago	United States	United Center
August 19	Cleveland	United States	Quicken Loans Arena
August 22	Denver	United States	Pepsi Center
August 24	Phoenix	United States	US Airways Center
August 25	Las Vegas	United States	MGM Grand Garden Arena
August 26	San Diego	United States	Cox Arena
August 28	Fresno	United States	Save Mart Center
August 30	Stateline	United States	Harveys Outdoor Arena
August 31	Oakland	United States	Oracle Arena
September 1	Anaheim	United States	Honda Center
September 2	Los Angeles	United States	Staples Center
September 7	Vancouver	Canada	General Motors Place
September 8	Portland	United States	Rose Garden
September 10	Boise	United States	Taco Bell Arena
September 11	Spokane	United States	Spokane Arena
September 13	Edmonton	Canada	Rexall Place
September 14	Saskatoon	Canada	Credit Union Centre
September 15	Winnipeg	Canada	MTS Centre
October 17	Moscow	Russia	Moscow Olympic Stadium
October 20	Addis Ababa	Ethiopia	Millennium Hall
October 22	Cluj-Napoca	Romania	Stadionul Ion Moina
October 27	Mumbai	India	Bandra Kurla Complex
October 30	Bangkok	Thailand	Impact Arena
November 1	Jakarta	Indonesia	JITEC
November 3	Macau		Cotai Arena
November 5	Shanghai	China	Shanghai Indoor Stadium
November 7	Taguig	Philippines	Bonifacio Global City
November 9	Seoul	South Korea	Olympic Gymnastics Arena
November 10	Seoul	South Korea	Olympic Gymnastics Arena
November 12	Taipei	Taiwan	Zhongshan Soccer Stadium

Festivals and other miscellaneous performances
A This show was part of the Essence Music Festival.

=== Box office score data ===
List of box office score data
Venue	City	Tickets sold / Available	Gross revenue
Acer Arena	Sydney	13,476 / 13,476 (100%)	$1,230,623
Brisbane Entertainment Centre	Brisbane	8,849 / 9,227 (96%)	$844,496
Continental Airlines Arena	East Rutherford	10,923 / 15,704 (70%)	$1,177,040
Madison Square Garden	New York City	26,109 / 26,109 (100%)	$2,744,345
Verizon Center	Washington, D.C.	13,248 / 13,248 (100%)	$1,242,263
Wachovia Center	Philadelphia	11,956 / 13,851 (86%)	$1,155,901
United Center	Chicago	11,682 / 14,961 (78%)	$1,051,165
MGM Grand Garden Arena	Las Vegas	10,171 / 10,171 (100%)	$1,251,970
Oracle Arena	Oakland	9,882 / 13,404 (74%)	$905,642
Staples Center	Los Angeles	11,664 / 13,797 (85%)	$1,301,488
Fort Bonifacio Global City	Taguig	70,000 / 70,000 (100%)	—N/a
TOTAL		197,960 / 213,948 (93%)	$12,844,933

== Personnel ==
Personnel adapted as per The Beyoncé Experience booklet and The Beyoncé Experience Live DVD.

Suga Mama:

- Musical Director/Guitar: BiBi McGill
- Musical Director/Bass: Divinity Walker Roxx
- Drums: Nikki Glaspie
- Drums: Kim Thompson
- Keyboards/Assistant Musical Director: Rie Tsuji
- Keyboards: Brittani Washington
- Percussion: Marcie Chapa
- Tenor Saxophone: Katty Rodriguez-Harrold
- Alto Saxophone: Tia Fuller
- Trumpet: Crystal Torres

The Mamas (Background Vocalists):

- Montina Cooper
- Crystal "Crissy" Collins
- Tiffany Riddick

Dancers

- Anthony Burrell – Tour Dance Captain
- Milan Dillard – Tour Dance Captain
- Tyrell Washington
- Byron Carter
- Clifford McGhee
- Dana Foglia
- Heather Morris
- Yanira Marin
- Jamie Overla
- Ashley Everett
- Mykal Bean – Male Dance Understudy

Crew

- Conception and staging: Beyoncé Knowles, Kim Burse, Frank Gatson Jr.
- Choreographer: Frank Gatson Jr.
- Tour Wardrobe: Tina Knowles, House of Deréon, Giorgio Armani, Versace, Elie Saab, Herve Leger
- Tour Manager: Alan Floyd
