= B'Day =

- Standard edition cover

Studio album by Beyoncé
- Released: September 1, 2006
- Recorded: April 2006
- Studios: Battery (Note: International Deluxe Edition track 1); Roc the Mic (Note: International Deluxe Edition tracks 5, 7, 8 and 18); Sony (Note: International Deluxe Edition tracks 1–6 and 8–14) (New York City); Futura (Boston); Hit Factory Criteria (Miami); Beach House (Note: International Deluxe Edition track 18) (Miami Beach); Great Divide (Note: International Deluxe Edition track 10) (Aspen); Henson (Note: International Deluxe Edition track 17); Lair (Note: International Deluxe Edition track 15); Record Plant (Note: International Deluxe Edition tracks 3, 4 and 13); The Underlab (Note: International Deluxe Edition track 16) (Los Angeles); La Marimonda (Nassau)
- Genres: Hip-hop; funk; R&B
- Length: 48:18
- Labels: Music World; Columbia; Sony Urban; Sony BMG; Parkwood (20th anniversary reissue)
- Producers: Eduardo Cabra; Darkchild; Sean Garrett; Rich Harrison; Nellee Hooper; Beyoncé Knowles; Lil Walt; Ne-Yo; Candice Nelson; The Neptunes; Rudy Pérez; Shakira; Stargate; Swizz Beatz; Shea Taylor; Syience; The Underdogs; Cameron Wallace

Beyoncé chronology
Live at Wembley (2004)	B'Day (2006)	Irreemplazable (2007)

Singles from B'Day
- 1. "Déjà Vu" Released: June 24, 2006; 2. "Ring the Alarm" Released: September 10, 2006; 3. "Irreplaceable" Released: October 17, 2006; 4. "Get Me Bodied" Released: July 10, 2007; 5. "Green Light" Released: July 27, 2007

Singles from B'Day: Deluxe Edition
- 1. "Beautiful Liar" Released: February 12, 2007

Singles from B'Day: 20th Anniversary Edition
- 1. "Morning Dew (Donk)" Released: July 4, 2026

B'Day (stylized in all caps as of 2026) is the second studio album by the American singer and songwriter Beyoncé. It was released on September 1, 2006, by Columbia Records, Music World Entertainment, and Sony Urban Music. (Note: In numerous countries, B'Day was released on September 4, 2006, to coincide with Beyoncé's 25th birthday.) The album was recorded in April 2006 and produced by Beyoncé, alongside Darkchild, Nellee Hooper, Ne-Yo, The Neptunes, Stargate, and Swizz Beatz, among others. The album features two guest appearances from Beyoncé's then-boyfriend Jay-Z; the deluxe and international editions include appearances by Bun B of UGK, Slim Thug, Shakira, and Alejandro Fernández.

Originally scheduled for release in 2004, B'Day was planned as a follow-up to Beyoncé's solo debut Dangerously in Love (2003). However, it was delayed to accommodate the recording of Destiny's Child's final studio album Destiny Fulfilled (2004) and Beyoncé's starring role in the film Dreamgirls (2006). While on vacation after filming Dreamgirls, Beyoncé began contacting producers and rented Sony Music Studios, completing the album within two weeks during April 2006. Most of the album's lyrical content was inspired by Beyoncé's role in the film, with musical styles ranging from 1970s–1980s funk influences and balladry to urban contemporary elements such as hip hop, pop, and R&B. Live instrumentation was used on most tracks as part of Beyoncé's vision to create a record with live instruments.

Upon its release, B'Day received generally favorable reviews from music critics, with most praise directed toward its sonic quality and Beyoncé's vocal performance. The album reached number one in Canada, Taiwan, and the United States, and the top five in Germany, Greece, Ireland, Japan, the Netherlands, Spain, Switzerland, and the United Kingdom. Among numerous additional accolades, it won Best Contemporary R&B Album at the 49th Annual Grammy Awards (2007). B'Day Anthology Video Album, which features 13 music videos accompanying the album's tracks, was released alongside the album's Deluxe Edition reissue in April 2007. B'Day has been certified multi-platinum in Canada, Ireland, New Zealand, Russia, and the United States. As of 2013, it has sold over 8 million copies worldwide.

B'Day produced six singles. "Déjà Vu" peaked at number four on the US Billboard Hot 100, while "Ring the Alarm" became Beyoncé's highest-debuting single at the time, but ended her streak of top-ten singles after peaking at number 11. "Irreplaceable" became her fourth Billboard Hot 100 number-one, while the deluxe track "Beautiful Liar" peaked at number three. Both singles achieved widespread international success. "Get Me Bodied" was released exclusively in the United States, while "Green Light" was released internationally; neither matched the success of their predecessors. To further promote B'Day, Beyoncé embarked on her second solo concert tour, The Beyoncé Experience (2007). A live album titled The Beyoncé Experience Live was also released.

== Background and development ==
Between March 2002 and March 2003, Beyoncé recorded up to 45 songs during prolific studio sessions for her debut solo album, Dangerously in Love. After the release of Dangerously in Love in June 2003, Beyoncé planned to produce a follow-up album using several of the leftover tracks. However, on January 7, 2004, a spokesperson for her record label Columbia Records announced that Beyoncé had put her plans on hold to concentrate on the recording of Destiny Fulfilled, the final studio album by Destiny's Child, and to sing "The Star-Spangled Banner" at Super Bowl XXXVIII in Houston, Texas, which was a childhood dream. Furthermore, she starred as Xania in the 2006 comedy-mystery film The Pink Panther, which was filmed in 2004. She also spent the following two years promoting Destiny Fulfilled and Destiny's Child's first greatest hits album #1's (2005), embarking on their final world tour, Destiny Fulfilled... and Lovin' It; the group disbanded in 2006.

Beyoncé originally recorded "Check on It" for The Pink Panther soundtrack; although it was not included on the soundtrack, it was released as the second single from #1's in December 2005 and became Beyoncé's third solo US Billboard Hot 100 number-one single, later appearing as a bonus track on the international editions of B'Day. In late 2005, Beyoncé postponed recording her second studio album after landing the lead role in Dreamgirls, a film adaptation of the 1981 Tony Award-winning Broadway musical of the same name. Because she wanted to focus on one project at a time, Beyoncé waited until the film was completed before returning to the recording studio. Beyoncé later told Billboard: "I'm not going to write for the album until I finish doing the movie."

== Recording and production ==
During a month-long vacation after filming Dreamgirls, Beyoncé went to the studio to start working on B'Day. She said: "[When filming ended] I had so many things bottled up, so many emotions, so many ideas", prompting her to begin working without telling her father and then-manager Mathew Knowles. Beyoncé kept the recording process quiet, telling only her artists and repertoire (A&R) executive Max Gousse and the producers contacted to collaborate on the album. She began working with songwriters and producers Rich Harrison, Rodney Jerkins, Sean Garrett, Cameron Wallace, The Neptunes, Norwegian production duo Stargate, and American hip hop producer and rapper Swizz Beatz. Two female songwriters who helped structure the album were also part of the team: Beyoncé's cousin Angela Beyincé, who had previously contributed to Dangerously in Love, and up-and-coming songwriter Makeba Riddick, who joined the team after co-writing "Déjà Vu", the album's lead single.

Beyoncé rented Sony Music Studios in New York City, influenced by her future husband Jay-Z's method of collaborating with multiple record producers; she used four recording studios simultaneously. She booked Harrison, Jerkins, and Garrett, each with a dedicated room. During the sessions, Beyoncé would move from studio to studio to check her producers' progress, later claiming this fostered "healthy competition" among producers. When Beyoncé conceived a potential song idea, she presented it to the group for discussion; within three hours, the song was completed. While Beyoncé and the team brainstormed lyrics, other collaborators such as The Neptunes, Jerkins, and Swizz Beatz simultaneously produced the tracks. The team sometimes spent up to 14 hours a day in the studio during the recording process. Beyoncé arranged, co-wrote and co-produced all of the songs on the album. Riddick, in an interview with MTV News, recounted her experience in the production:

[Beyoncé] had multiple producers in Sony Studios. She booked out the whole studio and she had the biggest and best producers in there. She would have us in one room, we would start collaborating with one producer, then she would go and start something else with another producer. We would bounce around to the different rooms and work with the different producers. It was definitely a factory type of process.

B'Day was completed within three weeks, ahead of the originally scheduled six weeks. Swizz Beatz co-produced four songs for the album, the most of any producer on the team. Beyoncé recorded three songs a day, finishing recording within two weeks in April 2006. Aside from Sony Music Studios, additional recording locations included Great Divide Studios in Aspen, Colorado, where "Freakum Dress" was recorded, and Los Angeles studios including Lair Studios, where "Irreplaceable" was recorded; Henson Recording Studios, where bonus track "Check on It" was recorded; and the Record Plant, where "Kitty Kat" and "Green Light" were recorded and "Déjà Vu" was assisted. Twenty-five songs were produced for the album; ten tracks were selected for the standard edition track listing and mastered in early July by Brian "Big Bass" Gardner at Bernie Grundman Mastering in Los Angeles.

== Music and lyrics ==
Many of the themes and musical styles of B'Day were inspired by Beyoncé's role in Dreamgirls. The plot of the film revolves around "The Dreams", a fictional 1960s group of three female singers who seek success in the mainstream music industry with the help of their manager Curtis Taylor Jr. (portrayed by Jamie Foxx). Beyoncé portrays Deena Jones, the lead singer of the group and Taylor's wife, who is emotionally abused by him. Because of her role, Beyoncé was inspired to produce an album with an overriding theme of feminism and female empowerment. On the track "Encore for the Fans", Beyoncé said: "Because I was so inspired by Deena, I wrote songs that were saying all the things I wish she would have said in the film." B'Day was influenced by a variety of American genres, and, like Dangerously in Love (2003), incorporated urban contemporary elements such as contemporary R&B and hip hop. Some songs feature 1970s and 1980s styles, created through record sampling. "Suga Mama", which uses blues-guitar samples from Jake Wade and the Soul Searchers' "Searching for Soul", contains a melody influenced by 1970s funk and 1980s go-go. "Upgrade U" uses a sample from Betty Wright's 1968 song "Girls Can't Do What the Guys Do". "Resentment" uses Curtis Mayfield's "Think" from the 1972 Super Fly soundtrack. "Déjà Vu" has a 1970s influence, "Green Light" has a classic groove, and "Get Me Bodied" features twang, a musical style that originated from Texas.

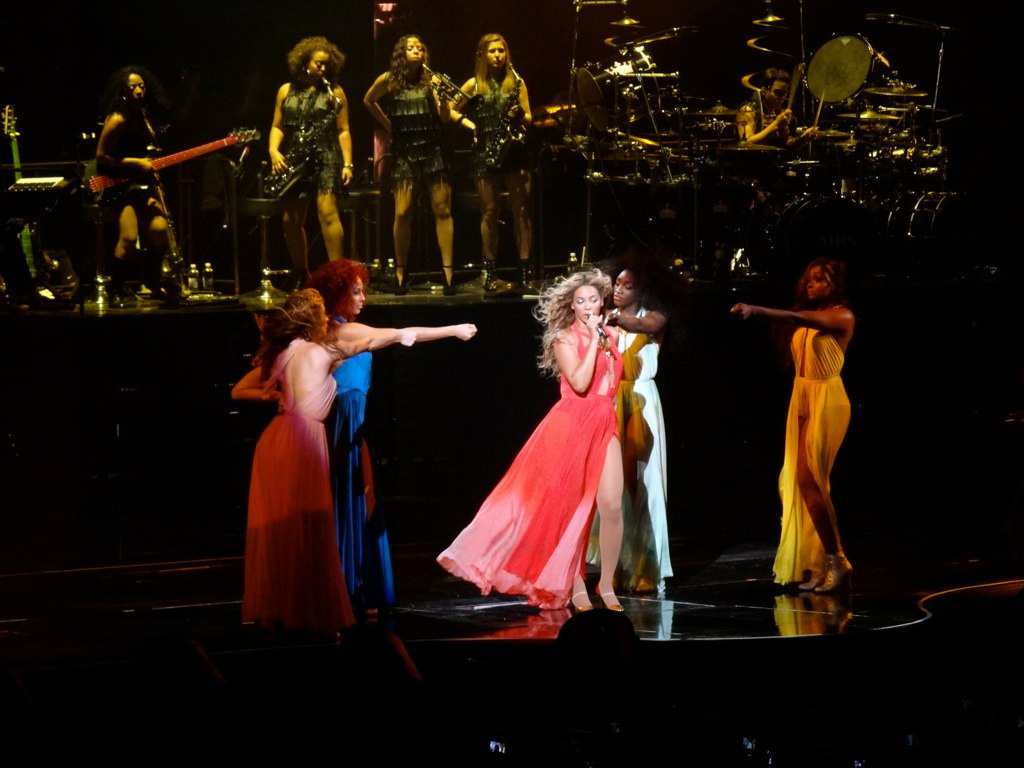
Beyoncé performing "Freakum Dress" during The Mrs. Carter Show World Tour in 2013

Beyoncé crafted most songs on B'Day through live instrumentation and diverse techniques. This is evident in "Déjà Vu", which uses bass guitar, conga, hi-hat, horns and the 808 drum; it also features rap vocals by Jay-Z. In an interview with MTV, Beyoncé said: "When I recorded 'Déjà Vu' [...] I knew that even before I started working on my album, I wanted to add live instruments to all of my songs..." Lyrically, the song describes a woman who is constantly reminded of a past lover, shown in the lines: "Is it because I'm missing you that I'm having déjà vu?" "Get Me Bodied" is a moderate R&B and bounce track, which shows influences from dance-pop, dancehall, and funk. Lyrically, it depicts a female protagonist dressing up to go out, leave a lasting impression, and get what she wants. The third track, "Suga Mama", is a midtempo R&B and soul track influenced by 1960s and 1970s funk and rock, along with elements of 1980s go-go, more closely resembling live music than Beyoncé's previous recordings. Lyrically, the female protagonist offers the keys to her house and car, along with her credit card, to keep her love interest and his "good loving" at home, presumably so he can listen to her collection of old soul records. This is shown in the lines: "It's so good to the point that I'll do anything just to keep you home ... Tell me what you want me to buy, my accountant's waiting on the phone ..." The protagonist also sees the man as a sexual object, asking him to sit on her lap and "take it off while I watch you perform".

"Upgrade U", which features Jay-Z, is about a woman offering luxuries to a man in order to upgrade his lifestyle and reputation, similar to the concept of "Suga Mama". Musically, it is a hip hop track with influences of pop, soul and R&B. The album's fifth track and second single, "Ring the Alarm", is an R&B song incorporating elements of punk rock; noted for the use of a siren in its melody, it "shows a harder edge to Beyoncé's sound". Lyrically, Beyoncé portrays a woman in a love triangle who is unwilling to let another woman profit from the effort she invested in making her lover a better man. "Kitty Kat" is a hip hop-influenced smooth R&B track about the female protagonist who feels that her love interest has underestimated her. "Freakum Dress" features a crescendo using a two-note riff and galloping beats. The song "advises women who have partners with straying eyes to put on sexy dresses and grind on other guys in the club to regain their affections". Meanwhile, the use of the "uh-huh huh huh" vocals and brassy stabs in the R&B-funk break-up song "Green Light" is a direct echo of Beyoncé's single "Crazy in Love" (2003), according to Peter Robinson of The Guardian. "Irreplaceable" is a midtempo ballad with pop and R&B influences, and is about the breakdown of a woman's relationship with a man after she discovers his infidelity. The standard edition's closing track "Resentment" is a soul and soft rock ballad about a gritty, agitated goodbye, which adds a "different kind of overwrought drama".

"Beautiful Liar", the opening track of the Deluxe Edition reissue of B'Day, is an R&B-pop duet with Shakira. Lyrically, it is about two women who choose not to end their friendship over a man who cheated on both of them; its main theme is female independence. "Welcome to Hollywood" is Beyoncé's solo version of Jay-Z's song "Hollywood", on which she was featured. It is a disco-influenced R&B track which lyrically details the fatigue celebrities sometimes feel. "Flaws and All" is an R&B and trip hop track on which Beyoncé shows appreciation for her love interest, who sees through all of her flaws and loves her unconditionally. "Still in Love (Kissing You)", which was later replaced by "If", is a cover of Des'ree's pop ballad "Kissing You". "If" is a ballad on which a female protagonist expresses disappointment with her love interest's mistreatment of her. "World Wide Woman" is an uptempo R&B track on which Beyoncé calls herself "a worldwide woman", a play on the term World Wide Web. The Deluxe Edition also includes "Listen", which previously appeared in Dreamgirls and its accompanying soundtrack. A soul-R&B ballad, co-writer Anne Preven described it as a song in which Deena Jones is exclaiming: "You don't know who I am, and I know I do".

== Title and packaging ==
B'Day was titled in reference to Beyoncé's birthday. The album's cover artwork was revealed on July 18, 2006, and features Beyoncé looking into the distance, wearing a golden low-cut dress and small golden hoop earrings, with dark eyeliner and her hair piled high on her head. The cover artwork for the Deluxe Edition is the same as the artwork used for the single "Déjà Vu" and B'Day Anthology Video Album, and features Beyoncé with a 1960s-inspired hairstyle and makeup similar to that on the standard edition cover, wearing a white and black top and golden hoop earrings. The Deluxe Edition booklet is very similar to the standard edition booklet, while featuring some new images. Images for both covers and booklets were photographed by Max Vadukul.

== Release and promotion ==
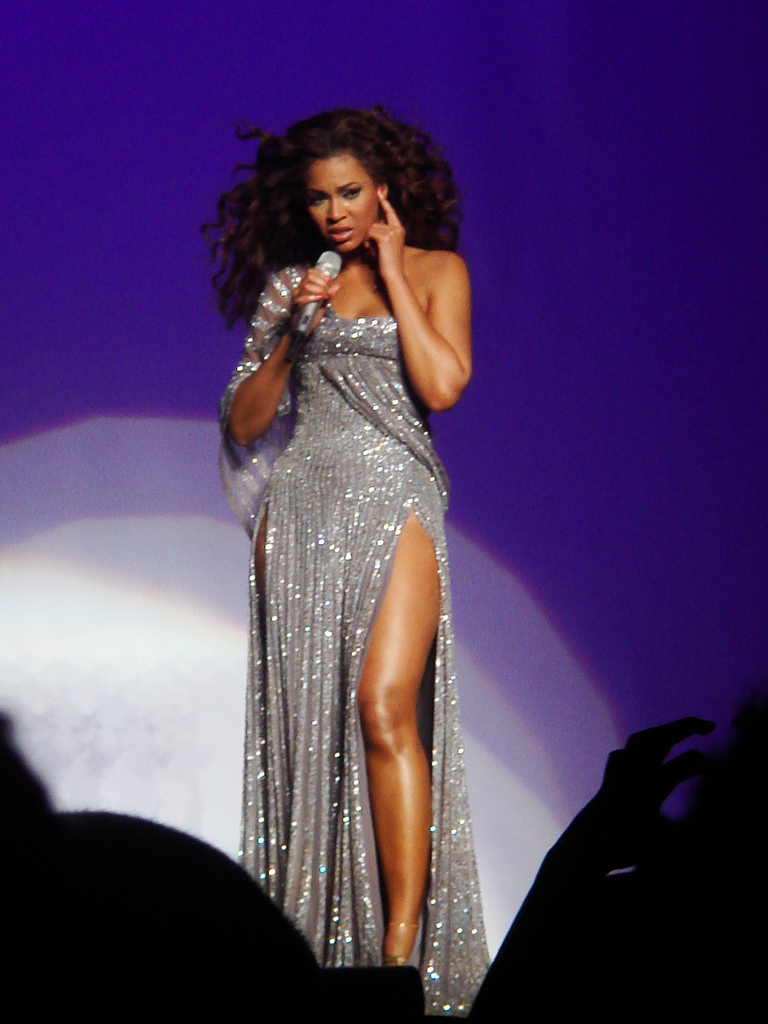
Beyoncé performing "Listen" during The Beyoncé Experience on May 27, 2007

In collaboration with Sony Urban Music and Music World Entertainment, B'Day was internationally released by Columbia Records on September 4, 2006, Beyoncé's 25th birthday, and in the United States the following day. Exclusively at Walmart, B'Day was packaged with a bonus DVD titled BET Presents Beyoncé (2006), which featured BET and performance highlights, and music videos from her solo career. To promote B'Day, Beyoncé appeared on various television and award shows from mid-2006 until mid-2007. She performed the album's lead single "Déjà Vu" with Jay-Z at the BET Awards 2006 at the Shrine Auditorium in Los Angeles on June 27, 2006. At the 2006 MTV Video Music Awards on August 31, she performed "Ring the Alarm" wearing a flowing trench coat, a corset and hotpants; the performance referenced Janet Jackson's "Rhythm Nation" routine. On September 5, Beyoncé made an appearance on Total Request Live. In an episode of The Ellen DeGeneres Show which aired the same day, Beyoncé performed "Déjà Vu" and "Irreplaceable". She performed "Déjà Vu" at Fashion Rocks on September 8, and performed "Crazy in Love", "Green Light", "Ring the Alarm", and "Irreplaceable" during an episode of Good Morning America that aired the same day. She also performed "Déjà Vu" on The Tyra Banks Show on September 15. Promoting B'Day in the United Kingdom, Beyoncé performed "Irreplaceable", "Ring the Alarm" and "Crazy in Love" on Popworld on October 27. Beyoncé opened the 2006 World Music Awards on November 15 with performances of "Déjà Vu" and "Ring the Alarm", and performed "Irreplaceable" later during the show. She performed "Irreplaceable" at the American Music Awards of 2006 on November 21 and, along with "Listen", on Today on December 4.

Seven months after the release of B'Day, an expanded two-disc reissue, subtitled Deluxe Edition, was released in the US on April 3, 2007. In addition to the original track listing, the Deluxe Edition featured five new songs, including "Beautiful Liar", a duet with Colombian singer Shakira. "Amor Gitano", a Spanish-language flamenco-pop duet with Mexican singer Alejandro Fernández, served as a soundtrack for Telemundo's telenovela El Zorro, and was included in the Deluxe Edition bonus disc alongside Spanish re-recordings of "Listen" ("Oye"), "Irreplaceable" ("Irreemplazable") and "Beautiful Liar" ("Bello Embustero"). The idea of recording songs in another language came from her experience when Destiny's Child performed "Quisiera Ser" with Alejandro Sanz at the 44th Annual Grammy Awards (2002). Beyoncé worked with producer Rudy Pérez on the recordings to retain the feeling of the English versions in the Spanish translations. The bonus disc was later released as the standalone extended play (EP) Irreemplazable.

B'Day Anthology Video Album was released simultaneously with the Deluxe Edition and featured 13 music videos, including the director's cut of the performance version of "Listen" and the extended mix of "Get Me Bodied". Most of the videos accompanied the uptempo songs on B'Day; they featured retro styling, color, and Black hairstyles, as Beyoncé thought this would create a resemblance between herself and the character she played in Dreamgirls, Deena Jones. The shooting of the videos was completed in two weeks; they were directed by Jake Nava, Anthony Mandler, Melina Matsoukas, Cliff Watts, Ray Kay, Sophie Muller, Diane Martel and Beyoncé herself. Initially, the DVD was available exclusively at Walmart, but was later released to other retailers. The Spanish songs were not included on international editions of the Deluxe Edition and were replaced by B'Day Anthology Video Album as the bonus DVD. Beyoncé promoted the Deluxe Edition of B'Day in April 2007 by performing the Spanglish version of "Irreplaceable" and "Green Light" on Today on April 2, and "Beautiful Liar" in an episode of The Early Show which aired on April 6. She performed "Get Me Bodied" at the BET Awards 2007 at the Shrine Auditorium in Los Angeles on June 26, wearing gold robotic gear, which she shed to reveal sleek gold lamé pants and a matching bra top. As she continued singing, her younger sister Solange and former Destiny's Child bandmate Michelle Williams appeared onstage as her backup dancers; a few moments later, Beyoncé introduced her former Destiny's Child bandmate Kelly Rowland, who performed her song "Like This" with Eve. After Rowland's performance, Beyoncé, Solange and Williams appeared onstage with Rowland to complete the Destiny's Child reunion.

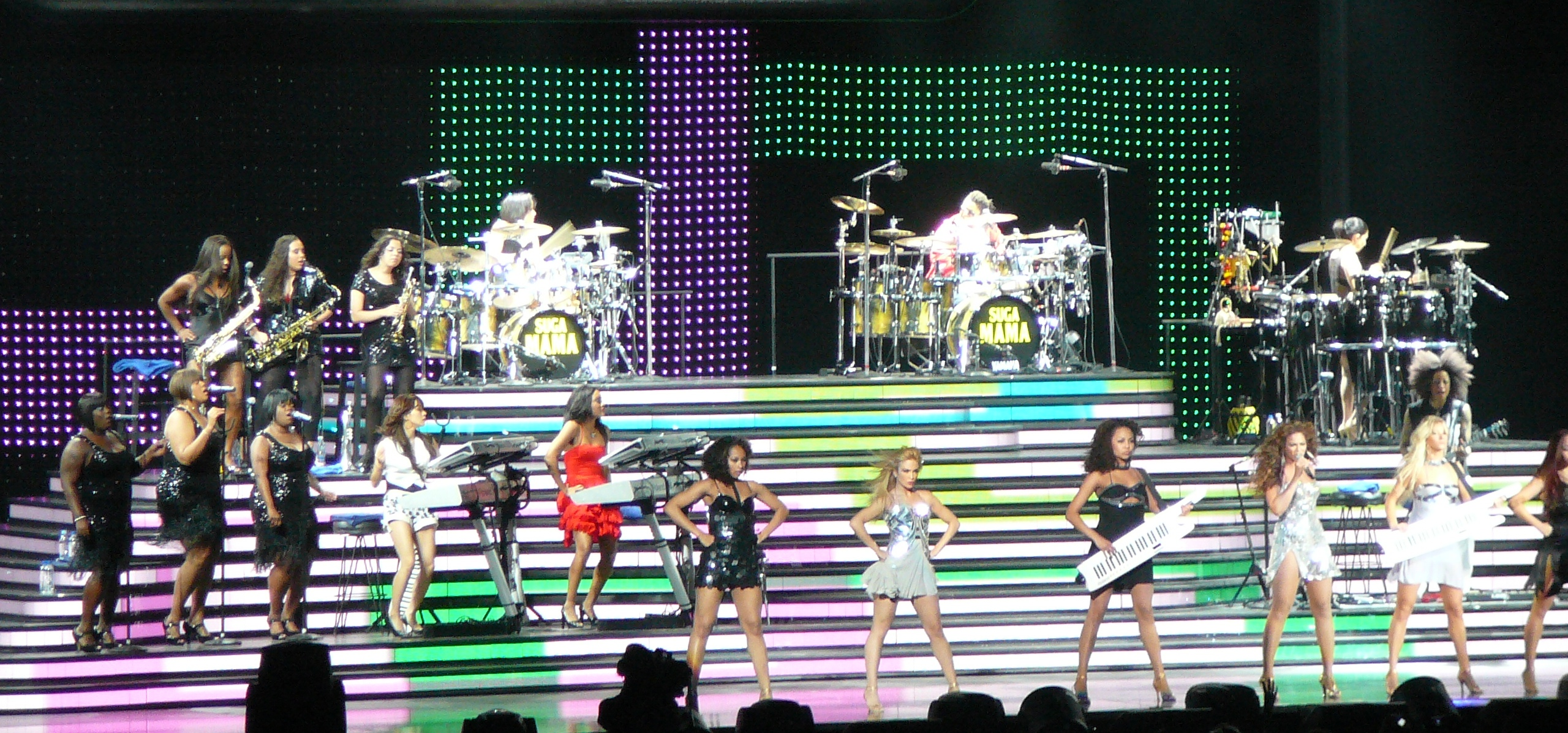
Beyoncé performing "Green Light" during The Beyoncé Experience on May 3, 2007

In mid-2006, Beyoncé looked for an all-female band for her tour The Beyoncé Experience (2007) to promote the album. She held an audition for keyboard players, bassists, guitarists, horn players, percussionists and drummers around the world. Beyoncé named the band Suga Mama, after the album track "Suga Mama". Although the band only consisted of women, both male and female backup dancers performed onstage. In addition to singing songs from B'Day, Beyoncé performed tracks from Dangerously in Love and a medley of Destiny's Child songs. She embarked on the tour in Japan on April 10, 2007 and concluded it in Taipei, Taiwan on November 12. During the Los Angeles show on September 2, Jay-Z and Destiny's Child bandmates Rowland and Williams made guest appearances. Footage from this show was filmed and released on November 20 as a live album titled The Beyoncé Experience Live.

On October 11, 2007, phone manufacturer Samsung unveiled a new variant of its popular Upstage handset inspired by the album. Officially named Beyoncé Special Edition B'Phone, it was available in a gold-and-burgundy color palette with a "Beyoncé logo" on top of its front-facing screen. Knowles designed the casing herself. The phone also included photos, videos and wallpapers of the singer, as well as an exclusive song called "632-5792" which she recorded when she was 10 years old. The device was released to consumers on November 4, 2007, and sold for $99 at Walmart, requiring a Sprint service contract.

== 20th Anniversary Deluxe Edition ==
"Morning Dew (Donk)", an unreleased song that had surfaced on the internet years prior and garnered viral fame, was surprise-released on July 4, 2026, by Parkwood Entertainment and Columbia Records. It was accompanied by the announcement of an imminent twentieth anniversary deluxe edition of B'Day, and a lyric video that repurposes archival footage directed by Cliff Watts.

On September 4, 2026, Knowles released the 20th-anniversary reissue of B'Day. The expanded 31-track edition featured remastered audio alongside previously released bonus tracks, additional Spanish re-recordings, and new material. Notable additions included the promotional single "Morning Dew (Donk)", "Can I Watch You" featuring American musician Pharrell Williams, "Cuerpo (Tumbao)" featuring Colombian singer Maluma, and "Irreemplazable (Como La Flor)", which incorporated vocals from American singer Selena's "Como la Flor". To accompany the audio release, a restoration of the visual components from the B'Day Anthology Video Album in 4K resolution from the original 35 mm film elements was announced. Pitchfork rated the reissue a 7.8/10, a rise from their 2006 review of the original at 7.2/10.

Beyoncé sold a $948.01 custom vinyl box, of which only five hundred were made, as part of the accompanying merchandise for the anniversary reissue. The price references the numerical spelling of Beyoncé's birthday (9/4/81), but the high price tag still sparked controversy. The box sold out, and many argued that those five hundred customers were simply exercising their financial ability and freedom to purchase the box.

The anniversary reissue sparked a re-entry for B'Day into the top ten of the Billboard 200, rising 385% to number eight with 38,000 equivalent album units from 16,000 pure sales and 22,000 streaming units. The momentum from the reissue pushed "Morning Dew (Donk)" to number one on Adult R&B Radio.

== Singles ==
"Déjà Vu", featuring Jay-Z, was released as the lead single from B'Day on June 24, 2006, to mixed critical reception. A commercial success, it peaked at number four on the US Billboard Hot 100 and atop the US Hot R&B/Hip-Hop Songs chart, and was certified gold by the Recording Industry Association of America (RIAA). Internationally, it peaked atop the UK Singles Chart, while reaching the top ten in 11 countries. The song and its Freemasons club mix received three nominations at the 49th Annual Grammy Awards (2007). The accompanying music video for "Déjà Vu", directed by Sophie Muller, was the subject of controversy due to its sexually suggestive content.

"Ring the Alarm" was released as the second single from B'Day exclusively in the United States on September 10, 2006. The song received mixed reviews from music critics, who noted its departure from Beyoncé's earlier work; while some commended her willingness to take risks, others were divided over her aggressive vocals. Commercially, it became her highest-debuting single, opening at number 12 on the US Billboard Hot 100. However, it peaked at number 11, becoming Beyoncé's first solo single not to peak within the top ten. The song was nominated for Best Female R&B Vocal Performance at the 49th Annual Grammy Awards. Its accompanying music video, Beyoncé's second consecutive video directed by Muller, reenacts a scene from the 1992 film Basic Instinct and was choreographed by then-16-year-old Teyana Taylor.

"Irreplaceable" was released as the second international and third overall single from B'Day on October 23, 2006. It received widespread critical acclaim, with some critics calling it the best track on the album. It was a commercial success, peaking atop the US Billboard Hot 100 and spending ten weeks atop the chart. Internationally, it reached the summit in Australia, Hungary, Ireland and New Zealand. It was ranked atop the 2007 year-end Billboard Hot 100, and was the tenth best-selling digital single of 2007 worldwide, having sold over four million copies worldwide by the end of the year. At the 50th Annual Grammy Awards (2008), "Irreplaceable" was nominated for the Grammy Award for Record of the Year. The song was ranked at number 25 on the 2000s decade-end Billboard Hot 100. Its Anthony Mandler-directed accompanying music video features the debut performance of the Suga Mamas, Beyoncé's all-female band.

After leaking onto the Internet in early February 2007, "Beautiful Liar", a duet with Shakira, was released as the sole single from the Deluxe Edition and the fourth single from B'Day on February 12. The song registered the largest upward movement on the US Billboard Hot 100 at the time, leaping 91 places from number 94 to its peak of number three in its second week. Internationally, it peaked atop the European Hot 100 Singles and on charts in Croatia, France, Germany, Greece, Hungary, Ireland, Italy, the Netherlands, New Zealand, Spain, Switzerland, the United Kingdom, and Venezuela. Critically acclaimed, it was nominated for Best Pop Collaboration with Vocals at the 50th Annual Grammy Awards. Its accompanying music video, directed by Jake Nava, features Beyoncé and Shakira dancing against different backgrounds, either together or separately.

"Get Me Bodied" was released as the fifth single from B'Day on July 10, 2007, exclusively in the US. It originally peaked at number 68 on the US Billboard Hot 100 in August, becoming Beyoncé's lowest-peaking single on the chart at the time. However, as a video of a woman named Deborah Cohen and her doctors dancing to "Get Me Bodied" before she underwent a double mastectomy was posted onto YouTube and went viral in 2013, the song found a new peak position at number 46 on the Billboard Hot 100. The song's 1960s-influenced accompanying music video was directed by Mandler and features Beyoncé's sister Solange and former Destiny's Child bandmates Kelly Rowland and Michelle Williams.

"Green Light" was released as the fourth and final international single from B'Day on July 27, 2007. It was originally planned to be released as the second single for the international markets, but Columbia Records opted for "Irreplaceable" instead. The remix extended play (EP) titled Green Light: Freemasons EP was released for digital download simultaneously with the single. The single was also planned for a physical release in the United Kingdom, but plans were canceled at the last minute, resulting in it peaking no higher than number 12 on the UK Singles Chart. Beyoncé co-directed the song's accompanying music video with Melina Matsoukas; the video features the second appearance by the Suga Mamas.

Although they were not released as singles, "Upgrade U", "Kitty Kat" and "Freakum Dress" appeared on several Billboard charts. "Upgrade U", featuring Jay-Z, was released as a promotional single in the United States on November 27, 2006, and reached numbers 59 and 11 on the US Billboard Hot 100 and Hot R&B/Hip-Hop Songs, respectively. "Kitty Kat" peaked at number 66 on the Hot R&B/Hip-Hop Songs. "Freakum Dress", which was cited as a possible second single from B'Day in June 2006, peaked at number 25 on the US Bubbling Under Hot 100 Singles and number 16 on the US Bubbling Under R&B/Hip-Hop Singles. In 2020, "Freakum Dress" went viral on TikTok and Instagram as part of the "Freakum Dress Challenge", appearing on many videos created by users of the platforms.

"Morning Dew (Donk)" was surprise-released on July 4, 2026, by Parkwood Entertainment and Columbia Records. Accompanying the song's release was a lyric video that repurposes footage directed by Cliff Watts.

== Critical reception ==
Professional ratings
Aggregate scores
Source	Rating
Metacritic	70/100
Review scores
Source	Rating
AllMusic	4/5 stars
Blender	4/5 stars
Entertainment Weekly	B+
The Guardian	4/5 stars
MSN Music (Consumer Guide)	A−
NME	5/10
Pitchfork	7.2/10
Q	3/5 stars
Rolling Stone	3/5 stars
Slant Magazine	3.5/5 stars

B'Day received generally positive reviews from music critics. At Metacritic, which assigns a weighted mean rating out of 100 to reviews from mainstream critics, the album received a weighted average score of 70, based on 23 reviews. Jody Rosen, writing for Entertainment Weekly, commented that the album's songs "arrive in huge gusts of rhythm and emotion, with Beyoncé's voice rippling over clattery beats". Jonah Weiner of Blender commented that "sweaty up-tempo numbers prove the best platform for Beyoncé's rapperly phrasing and pipe-flaunting fireballs". Andy Kellman of AllMusic felt that, despite "no songs with the smooth elegance" of "Me, Myself and I" or "Be with You", the album is "lean in a beneficial way". The Boston Globe's Sarah Rodman commented that the production team helped Beyoncé "focus on edgier, up-tempo tracks that take her sweet soprano to new places". Caroline Sullivan of The Guardian felt that, "apart from a few pop-R&B space-fillers, there's not much to dislike about B'Day". Robert Christgau from MSN Music said "on most of [the songs] she's wronged yet still in control because she's got so much money" and felt that Beyoncé "earns her props" if "opulence can signify liberation in this grotesquely materialistic time, as in hip-hop it can".

In a mixed review, Jon Pareles of The New York Times found the album "tense, high-strung and obsessive", and said that it was neither "ingratiating or seductive". Richard Cromelin of the Los Angeles Times observed that Beyoncé "heads into a new, more challenging terrain", but "some of the experiments don't click". Although he found the album "solid", Mike Joseph of PopMatters said that "aside from its relatively short running time, it sounds suspiciously under produced". Brian Hiatt of Rolling Stone felt that "while the mostly up-tempo disc never lacks for energy, some of the more beat-driven tracks feel harmonically and melodically undercooked, with hooks that don't live up to 'Crazy in Love' or the best Destiny's Child hits". Priya Elan of NME named only "Freakum Dress" and "Ring the Alarm" as highlights, criticizing that "too many tracks sound like updated versions of former glories" with no song on par with "Crazy in Love".

== Accolades ==
=== Awards and nominations ===
Awards and nominations for B'Day
Year	Award	Category	Nominee(s)	Result	Ref.
2007	Grammy Award	Best Contemporary R&B Album	B'Day	Won	
2007	NAACP Image Award	Outstanding Album	B'Day	Nominated	
2007	Soul Train Music Award	Best R&B/Soul Album – Female	B'Day	Nominated	
2007	American Music Award	Favorite Soul/R&B Album	B'Day	Nominated	

=== Listicles ===
Listicles for B'Day
Year	Publication	List	Position	Ref.
2006	Q	Recordings of the Year	72	
2006	The Village Voice	Pazz & Jop	79	
2008	The Daily Telegraph	120 Essential Pop Albums	–	
2013	Entertainment Weekly	100 Greatest Albums Ever	94	
2013	Vibe	The Greatest 50 Albums Since '93	41	
2015	Spin	The 300 Best Albums of the Past 30 Years	109	
2026	Consequence	The 100 Best Sophomore Albums of All Time	38	

== Commercial performance ==
B'Day debuted at number one on the US Billboard 200 on September 23, 2006, selling over 541,000 units in its first week. B'Day scored Beyoncé's highest debut-week album sales, until it was surpassed by her self-titled fifth studio album (2013), which sold 617,213 digital copies in its first three days. The album gave Beyoncé her second number-one debut on the chart following Dangerously in Love (2003); Keith Caulfield of Billboard surmised that "its handsome debut was generated by goodwill earned from the performance of her smash first album Dangerously in Love". B'Day fell to number three in its second week, and to number six the following week, falling out of the top ten in its fourth week at number 11. After seven weeks of being outside the top ten, B'Day reached number nine on the chart dated December 2, due to the success of its single "Irreplaceable", which helped the album regain its strength. It climbed to number six the following week, becoming the week's "greatest gainer", before exiting the top ten again. By the end of 2006, the album was certified platinum by the Recording Industry Association of America (RIAA), and became the 38th best-selling album of that year in the United States.

B'Day re-entered the top ten again at number six on the chart dated January 27, 2007, while Dreamgirls: Music from the Motion Picture was at the top. It remained within the top ten the following week at number ten, before falling to number 13 on the chart dated February 10. The RIAA re-certified B'Day triple platinum on April 16, combining the sales from the standard and Deluxe Edition releases. On the Billboard 200 chart dated April 21, B'Day jumped from number 69 to number six due to the release of its Deluxe Edition, gaining 903% in sales and becoming the week's "greatest gainer". It remained within the top ten the following week at number seven, before falling to number 13 on the chart dated May 5. The album has spent a total of 74 weeks on the Billboard 200. It became the 11th best-selling album of 2007 in the US. As of August 2022, the album has sold 5 million copies in the country.

Internationally, B'Day was met with similar success. In Canada, it reached number two on the Canadian Albums Chart, staying at the position for two weeks. It was certified platinum by the Canadian Recording Industry Association (CRIA). On the Oricon Albums Chart in Japan, the standard edition of the album debuted and peaked at number four, selling 72,921 copies in its first week, while the Deluxe Edition debuted at number nine with first-week sales of 17,519 copies, and peaked at number five in its second week on the chart, selling 23,153 copies that week. The standard edition was certified platinum by the Recording Industry Association of Japan (RIAJ) for shipments of 250,000 copies in Japan, while the Deluxe Edition was certified gold for shipments of 100,000 copies. The album's standard edition peaked at number six on the Top 100 Mexico chart, while its Deluxe Edition peaked at number nine. It was certified gold by the Mexican Association of Producers of Phonograms and Videograms (AMPROFON) for shipments of 50,000 copies in Mexico. Across Oceania, it had the same reception, debuting at number eight in both Australia and New Zealand the same week, on September 11, 2006. B'Day remained on the charts for 20 and 25 weeks, respectively, and was certified platinum by both the Australian Recording Industry Association (ARIA) and the Recording Industry Association of New Zealand (RIANZ).

In the United Kingdom, B'Day debuted at numbers three and one on the UK Albums Chart and UK R&B Albums Chart, respectively, on September 11, 2006, selling 35,012 copies in its first week. Its Deluxe Edition peaked at numbers eight and three on the UK Albums Chart and UK R&B Albums Chart, respectively, on April 29, 2007. The British Phonographic Industry (BPI) certified the standard edition platinum for shipping 300,000 units, and the Deluxe Edition gold for shipping 100,000 units. As of July 3, 2011, B'Day has sold 385,078 copies in the United Kingdom. Throughout Europe, the album peaked at number three on the European Top 100 Albums, while reaching the top ten in Denmark, Flanders, Germany, Ireland, Italy, the Netherlands, Portugal, Spain and Switzerland. It was certified platinum in Europe by the International Federation of the Phonographic Industry (IFPI) for sales of one million copies within the continent. As of 2013, B'Day has sold eight million copies worldwide.

== Controversies ==
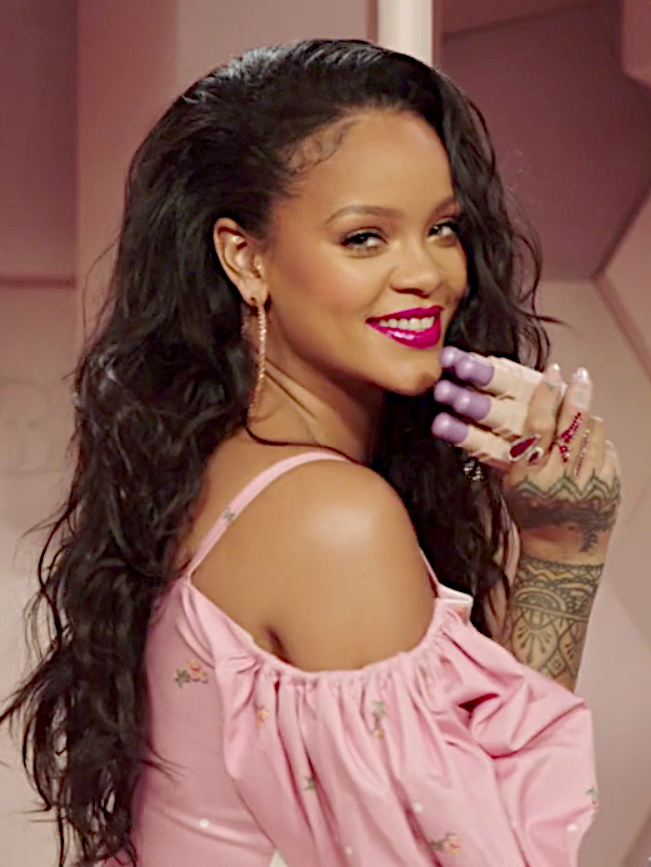
"Ring the Alarm" was falsely rumored to be written about the alleged affair between Rihanna (pictured) and Jay-Z.

B'Day was the subject of several controversies. The music video for its lead single "Déjà Vu" caused controversy due to its sexually suggestive content. A news article published by Hindustan Times reported that a particular scene in the video was suggestive of oral sex. Natalie Y. Moore of In These Times echoed the latter's commentary, writing that the video showcases Beyoncé "strutting her sexuality", and that in Jay-Z's scenes it "looks as if any minute now she'll give him fellatio". The video later appeared on Yahoo! Music News' list "Real Turkeys: The Worst Videos of All Time", which pointed to the negative fan reaction and stated: "It's probably the least horrific video listed ... but as far as Beyoncé videos go, it is a stinker." According to an MTV News staff report, as of July 2006, over two thousand people had signed an online petition addressed to Beyoncé's record label Columbia Records, demanding a reshoot for the video. By the end of August 2006, over five thousand additional fans had signed it. The petition requested that the video be reshot because it was considered to be "an underwhelming representation of the talent and quality of previous music-video projects of Ms. Beyoncé". Included in the list of complaints about the video were "a lack of theme, dizzying editing, over-the-top wardrobe choices, and unacceptable interactions" between Beyoncé and Jay-Z. Beyoncé's dance moves were also called into question by the petition, describing them as "erratic, confusing and alarming at times". Additionally, fans complained about the sexual themes depicted in the video, describing some scenes as "unacceptable interactions [between Beyoncé and Jay-Z]" and also complained of a "non-existent sexual chemistry" between the two.

The lyrics of "Ring the Alarm" were rumored to be about Barbadian singer Rihanna's relationship with rapper and Beyoncé's now-husband Jay-Z. According to a media speculation, Beyoncé, Rihanna and Jay-Z were part of a love triangle in 2006. It was rumored that Jay-Z had always been faithful to Beyoncé until he met Rihanna, whose popularity grew considerably during that year, who tempted Jay-Z to be in a romantic relationship with her while he was still with Beyoncé. As commented by Tom Breihan of The Village Voice, Beyoncé took advantage of "[people's] sympathy and unleash[ed] a burst of public rage in the form of ['Ring the Alarm']". In an interview for Seventeen, she, however, clarified that the lyrics had no connection with Rihanna, before adding that she was unaware of the rumors that had been circulating. Concerned that someone was trying to sabotage the release of B'Day, her father and manager Mathew Knowles released an official statement:

It is apparent that there is a consistent plan by some to create chaos around Beyoncé's B'Day album release on September 4 in the US. First, it was a petition against the single, 'Déjà Vu', then a rumor regarding conflict between Beyoncé and Rihanna, seizures caused by the 'Ring the Alarm' video, putting out a single to compete with LeToya's album and now to add to all the ridiculous rumors, is my plan to postpone the release of her 'B'Day' album. What will be next? Beyoncé's cut off all her hair? Dyed it green? Maybe she's singing the songs in reverse with some hidden subliminal message!

The cover artwork for the single "Ring the Alarm" fueled controversy after Beyoncé used alligators during the photo shoot. Beyoncé revealed that using the alligators and taping their mouths shut was her idea. People for the Ethical Treatment of Animals (PETA), an animal rights organization which had previously confronted her after she had used furs for her fashion line's clothing design, contacted a biologist who later wrote a letter to her, stating: "As a specialist in reptile biology and welfare, I'm concerned about your posing with a terrified baby alligator for your new album cover. Humans and alligators are not natural bedfellows, and the two should not mix at events such as photo shoots. In my view, doing so is arguably abusive to an animal."

Controversy also arose over the writing credits on "Irreplaceable". Ne-Yo, who co-wrote the song, told MTV: "Apparently Beyoncé was at a show somewhere and right before the song came on she said, 'I wrote this for all my ladies' and then the song came on ... The song is a co-write. I wrote the lyrics, I wrote all the lyrics. Beyoncé helped me with the melodies and the harmonies and the vocal arrangement and that makes it a co-write. Meaning my contribution and her contribution made that song what it is." In 2011, Ne-Yo said that he wrote the song for himself, but thought that it would suit Beyoncé better, and later regretted giving the song to her. Some of Beyoncé's fans read Ne-Yo's remark as disrespectful toward her. However, he clarified his comment later on Twitter, writing: "I said I originally wrote the song for me. ... Once I realized how the song comes across if sung by a guy, that's when I decided to give it away."

In 2007, Beyoncé appeared on billboards and newspapers across Australia holding an antiquated cigarette holder. Taken from the back cover artwork of B'Day, the image provoked a response from an anti-smoking group, which stated that she did not need to add the cigarette holder "to make herself appear more sophisticated". The same year, three weeks after their release, the Deluxe Edition of B'Day and the B'Day Anthology Video Album were temporarily withdrawn from retail stores. A copyright infringement lawsuit was filed over an alleged breach of contract involving the use of "Still in Love (Kissing You)", a cover version of British singer Des'ree's original song "Kissing You". Not originally intended for inclusion on the album, the song was subject to an agreement stipulating that its title not be altered and no music video be made. After the infringement case, the song was removed from the reissue of the Deluxe Edition, and was replaced by "If". The lawsuit was dismissed with prejudice in October 2007.

== Legacy ==
According to an editor of web publication The Boombox in an article published on September 4, 2016, to celebrate the tenth anniversary of the release of B'Day, the album was a "monumental moment for music fans worldwide and would elevate Beyoncé from princess-in-waiting to a full-fledged queen in the musical landscape". The editor also called the album Beyoncé's "most liberating body of work and its impact still echoes ten years later". In an article published by Revolt on the same day, B'Day was called Beyoncé's "first REAL visual album", noting that she would later release two "visual albums", Beyoncé (2013) and Lemonade (2016), and that almost every song from B'Day had an accompanying music video, which was "something we hadn't seen before". That same day, the website EST. 1997 published an article writing that the album's singles became "essential parts" of pop culture, and that "Get Me Bodied" is "now cemented as one of those songs that gets played by a DJ to get the crowd dancing at a wedding".

On April 3, 2017, the tenth anniversary of its release, the website published an article about B'Day Anthology Video Album, calling it Beyoncé's first "visual album" and stating that it "laid the groundwork for Beyoncé to become the pioneering visual artist she is revered to as today." Billboard published "Beyoncé's Best Fashion Moments from Her Decade-Old 'B'Day Anthology Video Album'" on the same day, a list in which editor Da'Shan Smith commented on the ten best outfits Beyoncé wore in the music videos, stating: "The project has delivered audiences some of the singer's most iconic looks. In every frame she appears in, Beyoncé oozes a radiant confidence, wearing stunning outfits and costumes to match." Vibe published a list in which Smith ranked all thirteen music videos from worst to best, stating: "B'Day Video Anthology Album must be heralded as an important pop culture artifact. As expressed before, it's the birther of Beyoncé's passion for providing fans visual sequences they need to tell an album's story. Imagine a B'Day without its Anthology—although the go-go and funk infused tracks already made an impression upon audio listens only, the visuals made the record pop to life."

== Track listing ==
=== Original edition ===
Standard edition
No.	Title	Lyrics	Music	Producer(s)	Length
1.	"Déjà Vu" (featuring Jay-Z)	Delisha Thomas; Makeba Riddick; Keli Nicole Price; Shawn Carter	Beyoncé Knowles; Rodney Jerkins	Darkchild; B. Knowles	4:00
2.	"Get Me Bodied"	B. Knowles; Riddick; Angela Beyincé; Solange Knowles	Knowles; Kasseem Dean; Sean Garrett	Swizz Beatz; B. Knowles; Garrett	3:25
3.	"Suga Mama"	B. Knowles; Rich Harrison; Riddick	Harrison; B. Knowles; Chuck Middleton	Harrison; B. Knowles	3:26
4.	"Upgrade U" (featuring Jay-Z)	B. Knowles; Garrett; Riddick; Beyincé; Carter; S. Knowles	B. Knowles; Garrett; Willie Clarke; Clarence Reid	Cameron Wallace; B. Knowles; Swizz Beatz^{[b]}	4:33
5.	"Ring the Alarm"	B. Knowles; Garrett	B. Knowles; Garrett; Dean	B. Knowles; Swizz Beats; Garrett	3:23
6.	"Kitty Kat"	B. Knowles; Carter	B. Knowles; Pharrell Williams	The Neptunes; B. Knowles	3:56
7.	"Freakum Dress"	B. Knowles; Beyincé; Riddick	B. Knowles; Harrison	Harrison; B. Knowles	3:20
8.	"Green Light"	B. Knowles; Garrett	B. Knowles; Garrett; Williams	The Neptunes; B. Knowles	3:29
9.	"Irreplaceable"	Shaffer Smith	Smith; B. Knowles; Mikkel S. Eriksen; Tor Erik Hermansen; Espen Lind; Amund Bjørklund	Stargate; B. Knowles; Ne-Yo^{[c]}	3:49
10.	"Resentment"	B. Knowles; Candice Nelson	Nelson; Walter Millsap III; Curtis Mayfield	Lil Walt; B. Knowles^{[d]}; Nelson^{[c]}	4:40
11.	"Encore for the Fans" (hidden track)				0:39
12.	"Listen" (from the Motion Picture Dreamgirls) (hidden track)	B. Knowles; Scott Cutler; Anne Preven	B. Knowles; Henry Krieger	The Underdogs; B. Knowles	3:38
13.	"Get Me Bodied" (Extended Mix) (hidden track)	B. Knowles; S. Knowles; Riddick; Beyincé	B. Knowles; Dean; Garrett	Swizz Beatz; B. Knowles; Garrett	5:59
Total length:					48:18

Deluxe edition
No.	Title	Writer(s)	Producer(s)	Length
1.	"Beautiful Liar" (with Shakira)	Eriksen; Hermansen; B. Knowles; Amanda Ghost; Ian Dench	Stargate; B. Knowles; Shakira^{[b]}; Eduardo Cabra^{[b]}	3:19
2.	"Irreplaceable"			3:47
3.	"Green Light"			3:29
4.	"Kitty Kat"			3:55
5.	"Welcome to Hollywood" (featuring Jay-Z)	B. Knowles; Carter; Reggie Perry; Smith	Syience; Knowles	3:18
6.	"Upgrade U" (featuring Jay-Z)			4:32
7.	"Flaws and All"	Smith; Robert Taylor; B. Knowles; S. Knowles	Shea Taylor; Knowles; Ne-Yo^{[c]}	4:08
8.	"World Wide Woman"	B. Knowles; Riddick; Beyincé; Daniels; Garrett	Darkchild; B. Knowles	3:41
9.	"Get Me Bodied" (Extended Mix)			6:19
10.	"If"	B. Knowles; Smith; Eriksen; Hermansen	Stargate; B. Knowles	3:18
11.	"Freakum Dress"			3:20
12.	"Suga Mama"			3:24
13.	"Déjà Vu" (featuring Jay-Z)			3:59
14.	"Ring the Alarm"			3:23
15.	"Resentment"			4:40
16.	"Listen" (from the Motion Picture Dreamgirls)			3:37
Total length:				62:25

=== 20th anniversary edition ===
Standard edition
No.	Title	Writer(s)	Producer(s)	Length
1.	"Déjà Vu" (featuring Jay-Z)			4:00
2.	"Get Me Bodied"			3:25
3.	"Suga Mama"			3:26
4.	"Upgrade U" (featuring Jay-Z)			4:33
5.	"Ring the Alarm"			3:23
6.	"Kitty Kat"			3:56
7.	"Freakum Dress"			3:20
8.	"Green Light"			3:29
9.	"Irreplaceable"			3:49
10.	"Check on It" (featuring Slim Thug)	B. Knowles; Dean; Garrett; Beyincé; Slim Thug	Swizz Beatz	3:30
11.	"Beautiful Liar" (with Shakira)			3:19
12.	"Flaws and All"			4:08
13.	"Morning Dew (Donk)"	B. Knowles; Angela Sherrie Woods; Darius Dixson; Williams; Terius Gesteelde-Diamant	B. Knowles; Williams	4:01
14.	"Resentment"			4:41
15.	"Listen" (from the Motion Picture Dreamgirls)			3:40
Total length:				56:40

Deluxe edition
No.	Title	Writer(s)	Producer(s)	Length
13.	"Resentment"			4:41
14.	"Listen" (from the Motion Picture Dreamgirls)			3:40
15.	"Morning Dew (Donk)"			3:56
16.	"My First Time"	B. Knowles; Williams; Chad Hugo	The Neptunes; B. Knowles	3:39
17.	"Can I Watch You" (featuring Pharrell)	B. Knowles; Williams	B. Knowles; Williams	3:36
18.	"Welcome to Hollywood" (with Jay-Z)			3:21
19.	"Lost Yo Mind"	B. Knowles; Dean; Garrett	Swizz Beatz; B. Knowles; Garrett	3:47
20.	"Creole"	B. Knowles; Riddick; Harrison	Harrison; B. Knowles	2:47
21.	"Back Up"	B. Knowles; Jerkins; Thomas; LaShawn Daniels; Fred Jerkins III; Anesha Birchett; Antea Birchett; Beyincé	Darkchild; B. Knowles	3:08
22.	"Get Me Bodied" (Extended Mix)			6:18
23.	"Cuerpo (Tumbao)" (featuring Maluma)	B. Knowles; Édgar Barrera; Juan Luis Londoño; Gesteelde-Diamant; Andrés Correa Rios; Luis Miguel Gomez Castaño; S. Knowles; Beyincé; Dean; Riddick; Garrett; Sergio George; Fernando Osorio	B. Knowles; Barrera; Casta; Ali "Ali Ali" Alvarez^{[c]}	3:08
24.	"Irreemplazable (Como la Flor)" (featuring Selena)	B. Knowles; Eriksen; Hermansen; Lind; Bjørklund; Smith; Rudy Pérez; A.B. Quintanilla III; Pete Astudillo	Stargate; B. Knowles; Smith^{[b]}; Perez^{[d]}	4:52
25.	"Amor Gitano" (with Alejandro Fernández)	B. Knowles; Jaime Flores; Reyli Barber	Pérez; B. Knowles	3:44
26.	"Listen (Oye)"	B. Knowles; Krieger; Cutler; Preven; Pérez	Underdogs; B. Knowles; Perez^{[d]}	3:39
27.	"Beautiful Liar (Bello Embustero)"	Eriksen; Hermansen; B. Knowles; Ghost; Dench; Pérez	Stargate; B. Knowles; Perez^{[b]}^{[d]}; Shakira^{[b]}^{[d]}; Olgui Chirino^{[d]}	3:33
28.	"Irreplaceable (Irreemplazable)"			3:46
29.	"Get Me Bodied" (Timbaland Remix featuring Voltio)			6:14
30.	"Irreplaceable (Irreemplazable)" (Norteña Remix)			3:50
31.	"Get Me Bodied (Mueve El Cuerpo)"			3:54
Total length:				119:51

=== Notes ===
- ^{^b} signifies an additional producer
- ^{^c} signifies a co-producer
- ^{^d} signifies a vocal producer
- All tracks stylized in all caps as of 2026 for the 20th anniversary edition.
- Track listing variants of the original standard edition
  - The Walmart-exclusive digital edition includes "Déjà Vu" (The Remix) as track 11. The track is inserted into the existing track sequence, advancing all subsequent entries without omitting any original songs.
  - The Circuit City-exclusive edition includes the bonus track "Back Up" as track 11, with "Encore for the Fans", "Listen" and "Get Me Bodied" (Extended Mix) as its hidden tracks.
  - The international edition includes "Check on It" featuring both Slim Thug and Bun B as track 11, with "Encore for the Fans", "Listen", and "Get Me Bodied" (Extended Mix) as hidden tracks.
  - The international iTunes Store edition includes "Déjà Vu (Edited Version)", "Check on It" and "Lost Yo Mind" as bonus tracks.
  - The Japanese edition includes "Creole" as track 11 and "Check on It" as track 12, with "Encore for the Fans", "Listen", and "Get Me Bodied" (Extended Mix) as hidden tracks.
- Track listing variants of the original deluxe edition
  - "If" replaced "Still in Love (Kissing You)" on all Deluxe Edition releases, following a copyright infringement lawsuit. "Still in Love (Kissing You)" was removed entirely from DVD releases. "Still in Love (Kissing You)" is written by B. Knowles, Desree Weekes and Timothy Atack, and produced by Knowles and Nellee Hooper.
  - The Best Buy-exclusive deluxe edition includes the hidden track "First Time" as track 17.
  - The international edition includes "Check on It" as track 17, "Amor Gitano" as track 18, and the radio edit of "Beautiful Liar" as track 19.
  - The international digital edition also includes "Creole" as track 20.
  - The Japanese edition includes "Check on It" as track 16 and "Creole" as track 17.
  - The Latin American edition includes "Amor Gitano" as track 17, "Irreemplazable" as track 18, "Listen (Oye)" as track 19 and "Beautiful Liar (Bello Embustero)" as track 20.
  - The North American edition includes a bonus disc featuring the EP Irreemplazable.
  - The international edition includes a bonus DVD featuring the B'Day Anthology Video Album.
- Track listing variants of the 20th Anniversary Deluxe Edition
  - "Cuerpo (Tumbao)", "Irreemplazable (Como la Flor)", "Get Me Bodied (Timbaland Remix featuring Voltio)", and "Irreplaceable (Irreemplazable) (Norteña Remix)" are excluded on the deluxe vinyl.

=== Sample credits ===
- "Suga Mama" contains a sample of "Searching for Soul", written by Chuck Middleton and performed by Jake Wade and the Soul Searchers.
- "Upgrade U" contains a sample of "Girls Can't Do What the Guys Do", written by Willie Clarke and Clarence Reid and performed by Betty Wright.
- "Resentment" contains a sample of "Think (Instrumental)" by Curtis Mayfield.
- "Morning Dew (Donk)" contains elements of "Twerk Something" written and performed by Cheeky Blakk.
- "Cuerpo (Tumbao)" contains a sample of "La Negra Tiene Tumbao", written by Sergio George and Fernando Osorio and performed by Celia Cruz, as well as an interpolation of "Get Me Bodied", written by Beyoncé, Makeba Riddick, Angela Beyincé, Sean Garrett, Swizz Beatz, and Solange Knowles and performed by Beyoncé.
- "Irremplazable (Como la Flor)" contains a sample of "Como la Flor", written by A.B. Quintanilla III and Pete Astudillo and performed by Selena.

== Personnel ==
Credits are adapted from the liner notes of B'Day: Deluxe Edition.

- Jason Agel – engineering assistance (track 5)
- Omar Al-Musfi – Arabic percussion (track 1)
- Roberto Almodovar – engineering (track 1)
- Allen "Al Geez" Arthur – horns (track 12)
- April Baldwin – A&R administration
- Aureo Baqueiro – vocal direction (Note: for Alejandro Fernández) (track 18)
- Reyli Barba – songwriting (track 18)
- Robert Becker – viola (track 15)
- Andres Bermudez – engineering (track 18), engineering assistance (track 5)
- Angela Beyincé – songwriting (tracks 6, 9, 10, 16 and 17)
- Beyoncé – executive production, mixing (track 12), production (all tracks), songwriting (all tracks), vocal production (tracks 14 and 17), vocals (all tracks)
- Amund Bjørklund – songwriting (track 2)
- Tim Blacksmith – management (Note: for Stargate)
- Aaron Brougher – A&R coordination
- Denyse Buffum – viola (track 15)
- Bun B – songwriting (track 17), vocals (track 17)
- Eduardo "Visitante" Cabra – additional production (tracks 1 and 19), programming (track 1), remix production (track 19)
- David Campbell – string arrangement (track 15), string conducting (track 15)
- Roberto Cani – violin (track 15)
- Tim Carmon – keyboards (track 15)
- Sean Carrington – guitar (track 16)
- Jim Caruana – engineering (tracks 1–4, 6–14 and 17)
- Gustavo Celis – engineering (track 1), mixing (track 1)
- Olgui Chirino – vocal production (track 1)
- Fusako Chubachi – art direction, design
- Willie Clarke – songwriting (track 6)
- Andrew Coleman – engineering assistance (tracks 3 and 4)
- Larry Corbett – cello (track 15)
- Tom Coyne – mastering (tracks 1, 5, 7, 8 and 19)
- Jasmin Cruz – backing vocals (track 18)
- Scott Cutler – songwriting (track 15)
- Danny D. – management
- LaShawn Daniels – songwriting (track 16)
- Mario Deleon – violin (track 15)
- Ian Dench – songwriting (tracks 1 and 19)
- Robert "LB" Dorsey – engineering assistance (tracks 5, 7 and 8)
- Andrew Duckles – viola (track 15)
- Bruce Dukov – violin concertmastering (track 15)
- Nathan East – bass (track 15)
- Paco "El Sevillano" – gypsy chanting (track 18)
- Alejandro Fernández – vocals (track 18)
- Jaime Flores – songwriting (track 18)
- Paul Forat – A&R
- Brian "Big Bass" Gardner – mastering (tracks 2–4, 6 and 9–17)
- Sean Garrett – production (tracks 9, 13), songwriting (tracks 3, 6, 9, 13, 16 and 17)
- Amanda Ghost – songwriting (tracks 1 and 19)
- Jason Goldstein – mixing (tracks 2–4, 6 and 9–14)
- Aaron "Goody" Goode – horns (track 12)
- Erwin Gorostiza – art direction
- Max Gousse – A&R
- Alan Grunfeld – violin (track 15)
- Rich Harrison – mixing (tracks 10 and 11), production (tracks 10 and 11), songwriting (tracks 10 and 11)
- Geraldo Hilera – violin (track 15)
- Jean-Marie Horvat – mixing (tracks 1, 5, 7, 8 and 16)
- Dabling "Hobby Boy" Howard – engineering (track 15)
- Ty Hunter – styling
- ILoveDust – logo design
- Jun Ishizeki – engineering (track 12)
- Eric Jackson – guitars (track 15)
- Quincy S. Jackson – marketing
- Jay-Z – songwriting (tracks 4–6 and 12), vocals (tracks 5, 6 and 12)
- Nathan Jenkins – engineering (track 17)
- Rodney "Darkchild" Jerkins – horn arrangement (track 12), instrumentation (track 12), mixing (track 12), production (tracks 12 and 16), songwriting (track 12)
- James Johnson – bass (track 15)
- Jon Jon – bass (track 12), production assistance (track 12)
- Ronald Judge – horns (track 12)
- Suzie Katayama – cello (track 15)
- Gimel "Young Guru" Keaton – engineering (track 5)
- Hannah Khoury – viola (track 1), violin (track 1)
- Kimberly Kimble – hair styling
- Rob Kinelski – engineering assistance (tracks 1–4, 6 and 9–14)
- Julia Knapp – A&R operation
- Mathew Knowles – A&R, executive production, management
- Solange Knowles – songwriting (tracks 6, 7 and 9)
- Tina Knowles – styling
- Henry Krieger – songwriting (track 15)
- Ricky Lawson – drums (track 15)
- Jolie Levine – music contracting (track 15)
- Espen Lind – guitar (track 2), songwriting (track 2)
- Dave "D-Lo" Lopez – engineering assistance (tracks 14 and 18), mixing assistance (track 18), Pro Tools editing (track 14)
- Riley Mackin – engineering assistance (track 15)
- Manny Marroquin – mixing (track 15)
- Harvey Mason Jr. – percussion (track 15)
- Curtis Mayfield – songwriting (track 14)
- Vlado Meller – mastering (track 18)
- Chuck Middleton – songwriting (track 11)
- Colin Miller – digital prep engineering (tracks 7 and 8), mixing assistance (track 1), Pro Tools prep (track 16)
- Walter W. "Lil Walt" Millsap III – engineering (track 14), instrumentation (track 14), Pro Tools editing (track 14), production (track 14), songwriting (track 14)
- MK – songwriting (track 6)
- Mo Horns – horns (track 16)
- Naser Musa – oud (track 1)
- Candice "G.G." Nelson – instrumentation (track 14), production (track 14), songwriting (track 14)
- The Neptunes – production (tracks 3 and 4)
- Sara Parkins – violin (track 15)
- Dave "Hard Drive" Pensado – mixing (track 17)
- Rudy Pérez – arrangement (track 18), backing vocals (track 18), keyboards (track 18), production (track 18), programming (track 18), Spanish guitar (track 18), vocal direction (track 18), vocal production (track 1)
- Clay Perry – engineering (track 18), keyboards (track 18), Pro Tools editing (track 18), programming (track 18)
- Denaun Porter – programming (track 1)
- Anne Preven – songwriting (track 15)
- Keli Nicole Price – songwriting (track 12)
- Boujemaa Razgui – ney (track 1)
- Clarence Reid – songwriting (track 6)
- Aaron Renner – engineering (track 15)
- Geoff Rice – engineering (track 2)
- Michele Richards – violin (track 15)
- Makeba Riddick – songwriting (tracks 4, 6, 9–12 and 16)
- Jared Robbins – engineering assistance (track 15)
- Jamie Rosenberg – engineering assistance (track 10)
- Kareem Roustom – additional string arrangement (track 1), violin arrangement (track 1)
- Shakira – arrangement (track 1), production (tracks 1 and 19), violin arrangement (track 1), remix production (track 19), vocal production (track 1), vocals (tracks 1 and 19)
- Haim Shtrum – violin (track 15)
- Dexter Simmons – mixing (track 17)
- Slim Thug – songwriting (track 17), vocals (track 17)
- Daniel Smith – cello (track 15)
- Chris Spilfogel – engineering (track 15)
- Stargate – arrangement (track 1), engineering (track 1), instrumentation (tracks 1, 2 and 8), production (tracks 1, 2, 8 and 19), programming (track 1), songwriting (tracks 1, 2, 8 and 19), strings (track 8), string arrangement (track 8)
- David Stearns – engineering assistance (track 1)
- Swizz Beatz – additional production (track 6), mixing (tracks 9 and 13), production (tracks 9, 13 and 17), songwriting (tracks 9, 13 and 17)
- Shaffer "Ne-Yo" Smith – production (tracks 2, 7 and 8), songwriting (tracks 2, 5, 7 and 8)
- Chris Spilfogel – engineering (track 15)
- Syience – production (track 5), songwriting (track 5)
- Shea Taylor – production (track 7), songwriting (track 7)
- Delisha Thomas – songwriting (track 12)
- Michael Tocci – engineering (track 7)
- Rene Luis Toledo – Spanish guitar (track 18)
- Steve Tolle – mixing assistance (tracks 2–4, 6, 9–11, 13 and 14)
- Francesca Tolot – make-up
- The Underdogs – production (track 15)
- Max Vadukul – photography
- Jeff Villanueva – engineering (tracks 12 and 16)
- Rommel Nino Villanueva – engineering (track 15)
- Cameron Wallace – production (track 6)
- Bruce Weeden – mixing (track 18)
- John Weston – engineering (track 1), string digital editing (track 1)
- Pharrell Williams – songwriting (tracks 3 and 4)
- John Wittenburg – violin (track 15)
- Shane Woodley – engineering (track 7), engineering assistance (track 18)
- Kenneth Yerke – violin (track 15)

== Charts ==
=== Weekly charts ===
Weekly chart performance for B'Day
Chart (2006–2014)	Peak position
Australian Albums (ARIA)	8
Austrian Albums (Ö3 Austria)	13
Belgian Albums (Ultratop Flanders)	7
Belgian Albums (Ultratop Wallonia)	12
Canadian Albums (Billboard)	1
Croatian International Albums (HDU)	3
Danish Albums (Hitlisten)	8
Dutch Albums (Album Top 100)	5
European Top 100 Albums (Billboard)	3
Finnish Albums (Suomen virallinen lista)	23
French Albums (SNEP)	12
German Albums (Offizielle Top 100)	5
Greek Albums (IFPI)	3
Hungarian Albums (MAHASZ)	22
Irish Albums (IRMA)	3
Italian Albums (FIMI)	10
Japanese Albums (Oricon)	4
Mexican Albums (Top 100 Mexico)	6
New Zealand Albums (RMNZ)	8
Norwegian Albums (VG-lista)	6
Polish Albums (ZPAV) (Note: In Poland, B'Day originally peaked at number 33 on September 18, 2006. Following the release of Beyoncé's self-titled fifth studio album (2013), it reached a new peak at number 29 on February 3, 2014.)	29
Portuguese Albums (AFP)	6
Scottish Albums (OCC)	9
Spanish Albums (Promusicae)	5
Swedish Albums (Sverigetopplistan)	15
Swiss Albums (Schweizer Hitparade)	2
Taiwanese Albums (Five Music)	1
UK Albums (Official Charts)	3
UK R&B Albums (Official Charts)	1
US Billboard 200	1
US Top R&B/Hip-Hop Albums (Billboard)	1

Weekly chart performance for B'Day 20th anniversary edition
Chart (2026)	Peak position
Belgian Albums (Ultratop Flanders)	19
Belgian Albums (Ultratop Wallonia)	10
Canadian Albums (Billboard)	90
Dutch Albums (Album Top 100)	17
German Pop Albums (Offizielle Top 100)	7
German Albums (Offizielle Top 100)	17
Irish Albums (Official Charts)	38
Italian Albums (FIMI)	89
Portuguese Albums (AFP)	28
Scottish Albums (Official Charts)	11
Spanish Albums (Promusicae)	22
Swedish Albums (Sverigetopplistan)	40
Swiss Albums (Schweizer Hitparade)	17
UK Albums (Official Charts)	31
UK R&B Albums (Official Charts)	1
US Billboard 200	8
US Top R&B Albums (Billboard)	1
US Top R&B/Hip-Hop Albums (Billboard)	2

=== Year-end charts ===
2006 year-end chart performance for B'Day
Chart (2006)	Position
Australian Urban Albums (ARIA)	13
Belgian Albums (Ultratop Flanders)	91
Dutch Albums (Album Top 100)	84
European Top 100 Albums (Billboard)	61
French Albums (SNEP)	199
Greek International Albums (IFPI)	41
Japanese Albums (Oricon)	55
Swiss Albums (Schweizer Hitparade)	96
UK Albums (Official Charts)	62
US Billboard 200	38
US Top R&B/Hip-Hop Albums (Billboard)	8
Worldwide Albums (IFPI)	6

2007 year-end chart performance for B'Day
Chart (2007)	Position
Australian Urban Albums (ARIA)	13
Belgian Albums (Ultratop Flanders)	57
Dutch Albums (Album Top 100)	84
European Top 100 Albums (Billboard)	63
French Albums (SNEP)	143
Hungarian Albums (MAHASZ)	88
Italian Albums (FIMI)	88
Mexican Albums (Top 100 Mexico)	62
Mexican International Albums (Top 100 Mexico)	16
Russian Albums (2M)	9
Swiss Albums (Schweizer Hitparade)	82
UK Albums (Official Charts)	140
US Billboard 200	11
US Top R&B/Hip-Hop Albums (Billboard)	6
Worldwide Albums (IFPI)	38

2008 year-end chart performance for B'Day
Chart (2008)	Position
US Billboard 200	170
US Top R&B/Hip-Hop Albums (Billboard)	85

=== Decade-end charts ===
2000s decade-end chart performance for B'Day
Chart (2000–2009)	Position
US Billboard 200	133

=== All-time charts ===
All-time chart performance for B'Day
Chart	Position
US Billboard 200 (Women)	91

== Certifications ==
Certifications and sales for B'Day
Region	Certification	Certified units/sales
Australia (ARIA)	Platinum	70,000^{^}
Belgium (BRMA)	Gold	25,000^{*}
Brazil (Pro-Música Brasil)	Platinum	60,000^{‡}
Canada (Music Canada)	2× Platinum	200,000^{‡}
Denmark (IFPI Danmark)	Gold	20,000^{^}
France (SNEP)	Gold	75,000^{*}
Germany (BVMI)	Gold	100,000^{^}
Greece (IFPI Greece)	Gold	7,500^{^}
Hungary (MAHASZ)	Gold	5,000^{^}
Indonesia	Platinum	
Ireland (IRMA)	3× Platinum	45,000^{^}
Japan (RIAJ)	Platinum	250,000^{^}
Japan (RIAJ) Deluxe Edition	Gold	100,000^{^}
Mexico (AMPROFON)	Gold	50,000^{^}
Netherlands (NVPI)	Gold	35,000^{^}
New Zealand (RMNZ)	2× Platinum	30,000^{‡}
Poland (ZPAV)	Platinum	20,000^{‡}
Portugal (AFP)	Gold	10,000^{^}
Romania	Gold	
Russia (NFPF)	3× Platinum	60,000^{*}
South Korea	—	6,500
Spain (Promusicae)	Gold	40,000^{^}
Switzerland (IFPI Switzerland)	Gold	15,000^{^}
United Kingdom (BPI)	Platinum	300,000^{^}
United Kingdom (BPI) Deluxe Edition	Gold	100,000^{^}
United States (RIAA)	5× Platinum	5,000,000^{‡}
Summaries
Europe (IFPI)	Platinum	1,000,000^{*}
Worldwide	—	8,000,000
^{*} Sales figures based on certification alone.^{^} Shipments figures based on certification alone.^{‡} Sales+streaming figures based on certification alone.

== Release history ==
Release dates and formats for B'Day
Initial release date	Edition	Format(s)	Ref.
September 1, 2006	Standard	CD; digital download; vinyl LP	
April 3, 2007	Deluxe (North American)	CD; digital download	
April 4, 2007	Deluxe (international)	CD; DVD	
September 4, 2026	20th Anniversary Edition (international)	CD; digital download; streaming; vinyl LP	
September 4, 2026	20th Anniversary Edition Deluxe (international)	Digital download; streaming; vinyl LP	

== See also ==
- B'Day Anthology Video Album
- Beyoncé discography
- List of Billboard 200 number-one albums of 2006
- List of Billboard number-one R&B albums of 2006
- List of Billboard number-one R&B albums of 2007
- List of number-one albums of 2006 (Canada)
- List of UK R&B Albums Chart number ones of 2006
- List of certified albums in Romania

== Bibliography ==
- Arenofsky, Janice (2009). Beyoncé Knowles: A Biography. ABC-Clio. ISBN 978-0-313-35914-9.
