= Upgrade U =

Promotional single by Beyoncé featuring Jay-Z

from the album B'Day
- Released: October 8, 2006
- Recorded: 2006
- Studio: Sony Music, New York City
- Genre: Hip hop; R&B
- Length: 4:32
- Label: Columbia
- Songwriters: Beyoncé Knowles; Angela Beyincé; Solange Knowles; Makeba Riddick; Sean Garrett; Shawn Carter; Willie Clarke; Clarence Reid
- Producers: Swizz Beatz; Cameron Wallace; Beyoncé; Sean Garrett

Music video
- "Upgrade U" on YouTube

"Upgrade U" is a song by American singer Beyoncé from her second studio album, B'Day (2006). It features additional vocals from rapper Jay-Z. It was composed by Swizz Beatz, Cameron Wallace, Beyoncé, MK, Makeba, Sean Garrett, Angela Beyincé, Jay-Z, Willie Clarke, Clarence Reid, and Beyoncé's sister, Solange. Columbia Records released "Upgrade U" as a promotional single on October 8, 2006, in the United States only. "Upgrade U" draws from the genres of hip hop and R&B. The concept of the song is that of a woman describing herself as the key to upgrading a man's lifestyle.

"Upgrade U" was generally well received by music critics, some praising Beyoncé's assertiveness while singing about her ability to improve her man's life (to one of extravagant luxury) with her presence. Many also praised the natural chemistry that Beyoncé and Jay-Z have in the song. After the release of B'Day, "Upgrade U" started to gain popularity on R&B and hip hop radio stations in the United States. This prompted its pre-release debut on the US Hot R&B/Hip-Hop Songs chart and later on the US Billboard Hot 100 chart; after its promotional release, the song peaked at number 11 and at number 59 on the Hot R&B/Hip-Hop Songs and the Hot 100 charts respectively.

The music video for the song was directed by Melina Matsoukas, and took one and a half days of shooting. Beyoncé did an impersonation of Jay-Z in the clip and is also seen amidst gold watches and jewelry, continuing the motif of luxury that is alluded to in the song. It finally emerged as the forty-fifth best R&B/Hip-Hop song of 2007 in the United States. Although Beyoncé did not perform "Upgrade U" in any televised appearances, the song was a part of her set list on The Beyoncé Experience tour (2007), and I Am... World Tour (2009–10), as well as her and Jay Z's joint On the Run (2014) and On the Run II (2018) all-stadium tours.

== Background and release ==
"Upgrade U" (or "Upgrade You") was written by Beyoncé Knowles, MK, Makeba, Sean Garrett, Angela Beyincé, Jay-Z, Willie Clarke, Blowfly and Solange Knowles; with production from Swizz Beatz, Cameron Wallace, and Beyoncé. It was recorded at Sony Music Studios in New York City. T.I. was to be the original rap guest on the song; however, he was unable to record his verse for the song due to business reasons. Ultimately, Jay-Z was selected as the featuring artist; "Upgrade U" becoming his second collaboration with Beyoncé on B'Day – the first being "Déjà Vu" (2006). The song was released as a twelve-inch promotional single on November 27, 2006, in the United States only.

== Music structure, theme and lyrics ==
"Upgrade U" (or "Upgrade You") is a hip hop song, with influences of pop, soul, and contemporary R&B. According to the sheet music published at Musicnotes.com by EMI Music Publishing, the song is set in the key of D minor, with a moderate groove of 92 beats per minute in common time. Beyoncé's vocals range from the note of G♯_{3} to E_{5}. The song features a synth-horn backdrop as well as a bounce-based hand clap beat. Like most of the tracks on the album, the beat is reinforced by the Roland TR-808 drum machine, while the song also features a heavy bass. "Upgrade U" samples Betty Wright's 1968 song "Girls Can't Do What the Guys Do", composed by Willie Clarke and Clarence Reid. Sal Cinquemani of Slant Magazine noted that similarities between "Upgrade U" and songs from the Destiny's Child era in the sense that it could make a "female self-empowerment" anthem. According to Mike Joseph of PopMatters, "Upgrade U" contains "the natural chemistry" that Beyoncé and Jay-Z have in real life. The concept of the song revolves around a woman offering luxuries to a man, to upgrade the lifestyle and the reputation of the latter; similar to the concept of "Suga Mama", another track from B'Day. Similarly, Phil Harrison of Time Out commented that the song has "a strange business-like" quality, which seems to posit a love affair as a business arrangement.

"Upgrade U"
A 28-second sample of "Upgrade U", featuring Beyoncé detailing how she will upgrade the lifestyle of her partner. Carrying a backdrop, consisting of synthesizers and horns, the song's bounce-based hand clap beat is amplified by the Roland TR-808 drum machine over a heavy bass.

Throughout the song, both Jay-Z and Beyoncé name-check a list of goods from prestige brands, companies, and personalities: "Audemars Piguet", a Swiss watchmaker; "Jacob the Jeweler", a celebrity jeweler; "Cartier", a jeweler and watch manufacturer; "Hermès", a luxury goods company; "Lorraine Schwartz", a celebrity jeweler; "Ralph Lauren Purple Label", a higher-end division of the famous designer's clothing line; "Natura Bisse Diamond Cream", a diamond dust mixed with cream; "6 star pent suites" (penthouse), of which only a handful exist in the world, such as at Crown Macau in China and Dreams Los Cabos near San Jose del Cabo in Mexico; "The Amalfi Coast", located in Southern Italy; "Fendi", a luxury goods company; and "The Bloomberg Luxury Accommodation Group", partly owned by the Calangian and Zobel families and located around the world catering to Hollywood-millionaire types. According to Eb Haynes of AllHipHop, Beyoncé displays "a lot of strength and confidence" when she mentions the assets she will gift her man to upgrade his lifestyle.

The song opens with a dialogue between Beyoncé and Jay-Z, with his verse rap sampling the lyrics, "How you gon' upgrade me? What's higher than number one? You know I used to beat that block. Now I be's the block." In the first verse, Beyoncé sings, "I hear you be the block but I'm the lights that keep the streets on". The chorus samples the lyrics: "You need a real woman in your life, that's a good look [...] Take care of home and still fly, that's a good look [...] Let me upgrade you, flip a new page". In the second verse, according to Sarah Rodman of The Boston Globe, Beyoncé "disturbingly conflates transforming her man into a leader" by equating providing him with Veblen goods to "what Martin [Luther King Jr.] did for the people", and after declaring herself the equal of her man offers to "let [him] take the lead role". Describing the lyrics of the second verse as Beyoncé's "funnier and more idiosyncratic than ever", Tim Finney of Pitchfork commented that she boasts of the song's "extreme makeover hard-sell" as she probably knows that she is "the only R&B singer" who could deliver those lines "with a straight face." Before the song ends, Jay-Z performs another verse-rap where he compares "the rock on his lady's finger to a tumor". In the third verse, Beyoncé declares to her love interest that his dynasty will ever remain incomplete without "a chief like [her]". She then delivers the chorus again before switching to her fourth and last verse: "Hermes briefcase, Cartier top clips, silk-lined blazers" and the song ends.

== Critical reception ==
"Upgrade U" received positive reviews from music critics, including those who complimented the assertive way in which Beyoncé expresses her desire of upgrading her partner with valuable assets. Eb Haynes of AllHipHop called the track "the finest of the Bonnie and Clyde, Ride or Die series". Sarah Rodman of The Boston Globe complimented the way that Beyoncé "declares herself an equal" and "disturbingly conflates transforming her man into a leader". Chris Williams of The Washington Post described the track a reflection of "buy-me-love sentiments". Andy Kellman of AllMusic considered "Upgrade U" the "most potent track on the album", which he described as a "low-slung Cameron Wallace production where Beyoncé wears and buys the pants while making her proposition sound more like empowerment than emasculation". Tim Finney of Pitchfork called it a "stiffly blaring" track and praised its lyrics, describing them to paraphrase as eccentric in a pleasant manner. Sal Cinquemani of Slant Magazine found "Upgrade U" could very well be a Destiny's Child track.

Bernard Zuel of The Sydney Morning Herald referred to it as a "mechanical" track. Phil Harrison of Timeout commented that "['Upgrade U'] hints at ambivalence towards bling aspirations." Mike Joseph of PopMatters wrote that the song survives not only due to Beyoncé's confident vocals, but also due to the chemistry that she and Jay-Z have both in the song and in real-life. He also added that Jay-Z's rhymes strongly suggest that "this rhyme animal is hungrier than ever". Carolyn Davis of US Magazine described "Upgrade U" as a "catchy track" where Beyoncé and Jay-Z address rumors concerning "a possible engagement".

Joy Rosen of Entertainment Weekly's listed "Upgrade U" at number five on his list of The 10 Best Songs of 2007, complimenting the collaboration of Beyoncé and Jay-Z in the song as "both halves of music's power couple pay tribute to the virtues of materialism." Shaheem Reid, Jayson Rodriguez and Rahman Dukes of MTV News placed the song at number 11 on his year-end list of 27 Essential R&B Songs of 2007. On their ranking of the best singles of aughts, Slant Magazine included the song at number 168."Upgrade U" was nominated in the category of Best Duet/Collaboration at the 2007 BET Awards, but lost to "Runaway Love" by Ludacris (featuring Mary J. Blige).

== Chart performance ==
After the release of B'Day, and before "Upgrade U"'s official release as a promotional single, the song gained popularity on R&B and hip hop radio stations in the United States. Consequently, it entered the US Hot R&B/Hip-Hop Songs chart, and later the US Billboard Hot 100 chart at number 92 in the issue dated November 18, 2006. After its release as a promotional single, it reached a peak at number fifty-nine on the Hot 100 chart and a peak at number 11 on the R&B/Hip-Hop Songs chart. The song re-entered the "Hot 100" chart on four occasions: it first fell out of the chart on January 13, 2007; re-entered on January 20, 2007, at number 94 and charted for two weeks only; it re-entered the chart on February 10, 2007, and was given the title of 'Best Comeback', though it fell off the chart the following week; it re-entered seven weeks later on March 24, 2007, at number 98, and stayed there for two weeks; The song made its last comeback on the Hot 100 chart on April 14, 2007, at number eighty, once again gaining the title of the 'Best Comeback'. This time it remained in the chart for five weeks. Overall, it remained on the Hot 100 for eighteen non-consecutive weeks. Although not officially released as a promotional single in the United Kingdom, "Upgrade U" charted for three weeks on the UK Singles Chart and peaked at number 176 on May 19, 2007.

== Music video ==
Beyoncé doing her impersonation of Jay-Z. (left)

The music video for "Upgrade U" was shot during the two-week filming for the B'Day Anthology Video Album. It was directed by Melina Matsoukas and Beyoncé herself. The video was shot between those of "Kitty Kat" and "Green Light", and took about one and half days of filming. Jay-Z performed his rap scenes first, afterwards Beyoncé studied his scene, and then did her impersonation of him. Melina said: "If anybody knows Jay-Z, it would be Beyoncé". Beyoncé commented on her impersonation of Jay-Z on MTV, "I love what I did in ['Upgrade U'] because it's completely out of my character, or at least the character that people think I am. I was pretending to be Jay[-Z], and he was there, and I told him he had to leave, because I couldn't do it with him in the room — it was way too embarrassing. I think I did a pretty good job. I had the lip curl down!" The video premiered on February 28, 2007, on BET's 106 & Park, with the video for Beyoncé's other single release, "Beautiful Liar" (2007), a duet with Shakira, premiering the same day on Total Request Live (TRL).

In the beginning of the video, Beyoncé is seen mouthing the words of Jay-Z's lyrics, dressed in masculine hip-hop style clothing. She is later seen wearing vintage Cazal 907 sunglasses while singing in the backseat of a Rolls-Royce Silver Cloud III. During the choruses she dances in a gold minidress, in front of a group of male back-up dancers. She continues the Jay-Z imitation through his rapped verse and, halfway through it, Jay-Z appears to finish the rap himself with Beyoncé dancing around him, wearing a classic white dress-shirt. Beyoncé is seen amidst gold watches and jewelry, continuing the motif of luxury that is alluded to in the song. The music video for "Upgrade U" peaked at number six on BET's 106 & Park while it peaked at number one in the United Kingdom on MTV Base's Chart Show on May 16, 2007. The music video has been used as a commercial to advertise high definition satellite television from DirecTV; though portions of the video were re-shot for her announcement.

== Live performances and covers ==
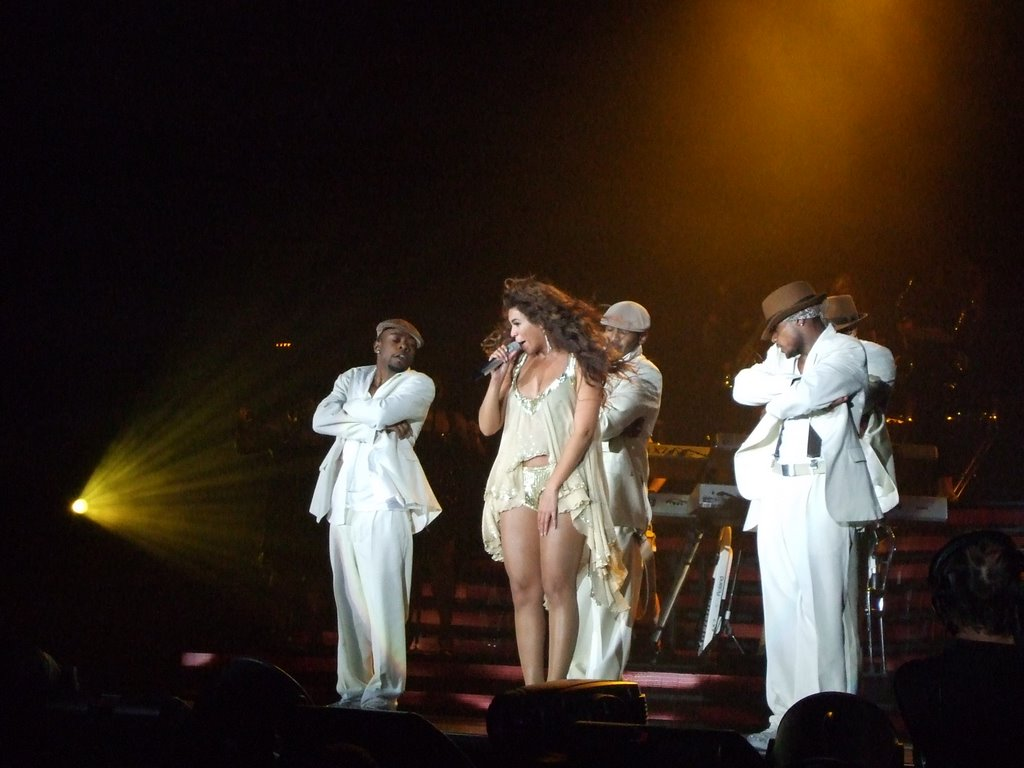
Beyoncé performing "Upgrade U" on The Beyoncé Experience with several male backup dancers.

Although Beyoncé did not perform the song in any televised appearances, it was a part of her set list on The Beyoncé Experience with Jay-Z in Los Angeles on September 2, 2007, and her worldwide I Am... World Tour. When Beyoncé performed the song in Sunrise, Florida, on June 29, 2009, she was wearing a glittering gold leotard. As she sang, animated graphics of turntables, faders, and other nightclub equipment pulsed behind her, her dancers and the musicians. Beyoncé was accompanied by two drummers, two keyboardists, a percussionist, a horn section, three backup vocalists (collectively called Suga Mama), and guitarist Bibi McGill. "Upgrade U" was included as the fourteenth and twenty-second tracks on her live albums The Beyoncé Experience Live (2007) and I Am... World Tour (2010), respectively. "Upgrade U" was part of the set list of Beyoncé and Jay-Z's co-headlining On the Run Tour (2014).

2 Pistols' debut single "She Got It", which features T-Pain and the phrase "let me upgrade u", was included on his 2008 debut album, Death Before Dishonor. Additionally, Fabolous' "Make Me Better" featuring Ne-Yo, released on his From Nothin' to Somethin' album, uses the phrase "front page ya". Other songs that have made lyrical references to "Upgrade U", include: Lil' Mama's "Lip Gloss", Kanye West's first verse in the freestyle of Rich Boy's "Throw Some D's", and Bow Wow's rap verse on the remix of Paula DeAnda's "Easy". Lil Wayne performed a freestyle titled "Upgrade" over the beat of "Upgrade U" on his mixtape Da Drought 3 that was later included on Nicki Minaj's mixtape "Playtime Is Over". Beyoncé's former Destiny's Child group member LeToya Luckett also referenced this song on a bonus track titled "Swagger" on her second album "Lady Love", which features the lyric: 'like bee say, 'let me upgrade ya'.

== Formats and track listings ==
- 12" single

Side one

1. "Upgrade U" (album version) – 4:32
2. "Upgrade U" (instrumental) – 4:32

Side two

1. "Upgrade U" (album version) – 4:32
2. "Upgrade U" (a cappella) – 4:32

== Credits and personnel ==
Credits are taken from B'Day liner notes.

- Beyoncé Knowles and Jay-Z – vocals
- Jason Goldstein – mixing
- Steve Tolle – assistant mixer
- Sony Music Studios, New York City – recording location
- Rob Kinelski – recording assistant

== Charts ==
=== Weekly charts ===
Chart (2006–07)	Peak position
CIS Airplay (TopHit)	186
Romania (Romanian Top 100)	28
US Billboard Hot 100	59
US Hot R&B/Hip-Hop Songs (Billboard)	11

=== Year-end charts ===
Chart (2007)	Position
Romania (Romanian Top 100)	68
US Hot R&B/Hip Hop Songs (Billboard)	45

== Certifications ==
Region	Certification	Certified units/sales
Australia (ARIA)	Platinum	70,000^{‡}
Canada (Music Canada)	Gold	40,000^{‡}
New Zealand (RMNZ)	Gold	15,000^{‡}
United Kingdom (BPI)	Silver	200,000^{‡}
United States (RIAA)	2× Platinum	2,000,000^{‡}
^{‡} Sales+streaming figures based on certification alone.
