= Lorraine Schwartz =

American bespoke high jewellery designer

Lorraine E. Schwartz
- Known for: Jewelry designer
- Notable work: Diamond and gold jewelry

Lorraine Schwartz is an American bespoke high jewellery designer. She has designed jewelry for a host of famous female celebrities including Beyoncé, Jennifer Lopez and Kim Kardashian. In 2009, Angelina Jolie wore to the Oscars a pair of emerald earrings designed by Schwartz, valued at $2.5 million.

== Career ==
Schwartz states that in 2002 Halle Berry wore her jewellery on the red carpet. Since, she has designed for celebrities such as Kelly Rowland, Beyoncé Knowles, Jennifer Lopez and Cate Blanchett. For ESPN The Magazine, she made a "30-carat, diamond-and-ruby logo" for their 10th anniversary baseball caps. She was also involved in the "Art for Life" gala in 2007, which was led by Russell Simmons and his ex-wife, Kimora Lee Simmons. In the 2006 Beyoncé song, "Upgrade U", and the 2023 song, "My House", Lorraine Schwartz is mentioned. Kim Kardashian wears a 15-carat diamond engagement ring by Schwartz, given to her by her now ex-husband, Kanye West.

== Philanthropy ==
In 2009, she created the Shulamit Benjamini Sandberg Medical Research Grant, which supports a physician with $225,000 to last over three years for cancer research. It was created "in honor of her late mother".
