= Morning Dew (Donk) =

Single by Beyoncé

from the album B'Day: 20th Anniversary Edition
- Released: July 4, 2026
- Recorded: 2013
- Genre: R&B
- Length: 4:03
- Label: Parkwood; Columbia
- Songwriters: Beyoncé; Angela Sherrie Woods; Darius Dixson; Pharrell Williams; Terius Gesteelde-Diamant
- Producers: Beyoncé; Pharrell Williams

Beyoncé singles chronology
"II Most Wanted" (2024)	"Morning Dew (Donk)" (2026)

Lyric video
- "Morning Dew (Donk)" on YouTube

"Morning Dew (Donk)" (stylized in all caps) is a song by American singer Beyoncé. It was surprise-released on July 4, 2026, and is the first single from the 20th-anniversary edition of her second studio album B'Day. A demo of the song, recorded during sessions for her 2013 self-titled album Beyoncé, previously leaked online in 2023 and went viral on TikTok. The song received a nomination for Best R&B Solo Performance at the 69th Annual Grammy Awards, marking Beyoncé's record-breaking 100th nomination.

== Background ==
Around October 2014, a song titled "Donk" was registered under Beyoncé's name to the American Society of Composers, Authors and Publishers database. "Donk" received press from media outlets the following month after it appeared on an alleged track list of a later-debunked edition of Beyoncé, her 2013 studio album, that circulated online. The song was recorded during sessions for the album; in 2021, a snippet of its demo was leaked on social media. The full version was leaked in September 2023, and it went viral on the video platform TikTok.

== Music and lyrics ==
"Donk" was officially released under the title "Morning Dew (Donk)". The final version runs for about four minutes. "Morning Dew (Donk)" is an R&B song, retaining some elements of Beyoncé's musical style in 2013, built around a sultry sound and a bouncy, groovy rhythm. It was written by Beyoncé, Pharrell Williams, The-Dream, Darius Dixson, and produced by Beyoncé and Williams. It contains elements of "Twerk Something", written and performed by Cheeky Blakk, released in 1994.

In "Morning Dew (Donk)", Beyoncé sings about a romantic relationship that, despite having lasted for a while, still makes her feel young love. The lyrics revolve around her intense devotion to a long-time partner, reflecting on their time spent together on activities like watching the film Purple Rain. She declares in the first verse, "I think I wanna go back to school and have my locker full of pictures of you / So give me that 'A' in biology, I'm graduatin' soon". The lyrics are sexually charged, utilizing specific innuendos to communicate this tone. Beyoncé sings about how much her partner is sexually attracted to her and adds, "You know the sun rise for you / Give me that morning dew".

== Release ==
"Morning Dew (Donk)" was Beyoncé's first music release in two years, following that of Cowboy Carter, her eighth studio album. The song was surprise-released via streaming services on July 4, 2026, by Parkwood Entertainment and Columbia Records. It impacted rhythmic, urban, and R&B radio in the US later that month, on July 28.

"Morning Dew (Donk)" marked the start of a 60-day countdown leading up to the 20th-anniversary edition of B'Day, Beyoncé's second studio album. The song serves as the reissue's lead single. Accompanying the release of "Morning Dew (Donk)" was a black-and-white lyric video, which repurposes 2007 footage from Beyoncé's swimwear photoshoot with Sports Illustrated, shot and directed by Cliff Watts.

On August 4, an EP featuring four additional versions of "Morning Dew (Donk)", subtitled "Remix Pack", was released on streaming services. It includes explicit and clean versions of a remix featuring Jay-Z, which samples "Donk" by Soulja Boy, "Between the Sheets" by The Isley Brothers, and "Mo Bamba" by Sheck Wes. The title of the third version, "Morning Dew (Donk) Acoustic 4:44", references Jay-Z's 2017 studio album 4:44.

== Critical reception ==
Kiana Mickles of Pitchfork called the song a contender for 2026 song of the summer, writing that it had "an effortless beat that unites twerking claps, crepuscular chords, and the flirty swagger of Bey's mid-aughts era".

== Accolades ==
Awards and nominations
Organization	Year	Category	Result	Ref.
Grammy Awards	2027	Best R&B Solo Performance	Pending	

== Track listings ==
- Digital download and streaming
1. "Morning Dew (Donk)" – 4:03
- Morning Dew (Donk) Remix Pack
1. "Morning Dew (Donk)" (remix featuring Jay-Z) – 3:37
2. "Morning Dew (Donk)" (Donk Mix) – 4:04
3. "Morning Dew (Donk)" (acoustic) – 4:44
4. "Morning Dew (Donk)" (remix featuring Jay-Z, clean) – 3:37

== Personnel ==
Adapted from Spotify and Tidal

- Beyoncé – songwriting, production, vocals
- Angela Sherrie Woods – songwriting
- Darius Dixson – songwriting
- Pharrell Williams – songwriting, production
- Terius Gesteelde-Diamant – songwriting
- Matheus Braz – recording assistance, vocal engineering
- Matthew Desrameaux – recording assistance
- Andrew Coleman – recording
- Mike Larson – recording
- Stuart White – mixing, vocal engineering
- Colin Leonard – mastering
- Thomas Roussel – string orchestration, orchestra conducting (tracks 2 and 3)

== Charts ==
Chart performance
Chart (2026)	Peak position
Australia (ARIA)	86
Australia Hip Hop/R&B (ARIA)	12
Canada Hot 100 (Billboard)	82
Global 200 (Billboard)	57
Guatemala Anglo Airplay (Monitor Latino)	4
Japan Hot Overseas (Billboard Japan)	11
Netherlands (Single Tip)	19
New Zealand Hot Singles (RMNZ)	2
Nigeria (TurnTable Top 100)	71
South Africa Airplay (TOSAC)	8
South Africa Streaming (TOSAC)	25
UK Singles (Official Charts)	60
UK Hip Hop/R&B (Official Charts)	12
US Billboard Hot 100	26
US Hot R&B/Hip-Hop Songs (Billboard)	6
US Rhythmic Airplay (Billboard)	2

== Release history ==
Release dates and formats
Region	Date	Format	Version	Label	Ref.
Various	July 4, 2026	Digital download; streaming	Original	Parkwood; Columbia	
Italy	July 17, 2026	Radio airplay	Original	Sony	
United States	July 28, 2026	Rhythmic radio; urban radio; R&B radio	Original	Columbia	
Various	August 5, 2026	Digital download; streaming	Remixes	Parkwood; Columbia	
