= Kitty Kat (song) =

Song by Beyoncé

from the album B'Day
- Recorded: 2006
- Studio: Sony Music (New York); Record Plant (Los Angeles)
- Genre: Electro; hip-hop soul; R&B
- Length: 3:55
- Label: Columbia; Sony Music
- Songwriters: Beyoncé Knowles; Pharrell Williams; Shawn Carter
- Producers: Beyoncé Knowles; The Neptunes

Music video
- "Kitty Kat" on YouTube

"Kitty Kat" is a song by American singer Beyoncé for her second studio album, B'Day (2006). It was composed by Beyoncé, Pharrell Williams, and Shawn Carter. "Kitty Kat" is a mid-tempo electro, hip hop soul and R&B song whose lyrics detail a situation where a woman feels that her man has underestimated her. The song was generally well received by music critics who noted it to be a seductive track thanks to its "I'm not feelin[g] it" vibe. However, some music critics felt that the production does not live up to those of other songs featured on B'Day.

"Kitty Kat" was never released as a single but it garnered airplay on R&B radio stations, thus managing to chart on the US Hot R&B/Hip-Hop Songs chart, where it reached a high point of number 66 in May 2007. The accompanying music video for the song was directed by Melina Matsoukas and co-directed by Beyoncé for the B'Day Anthology Video Album (2007). It is only one-minute long and it serves as the introduction of the music video for "Green Light" (2007). The video for "Kitty Kat" features Beyoncé showing cat-like eyes with leopard print make-up and fashion on. In some parts of the clip, Beyoncé rides on an oversized black cat.

== Background ==
"Kitty Kat" was conceived partly at the Sony Music Studios, in New York City and the Record Plant Studios, in Los Angeles. It sees songwriting duties by Beyoncé, Pharrell Williams, as well as Shawn Carter, and utilizes production from The Neptunes, compromising of Williams and Chad Hugo. The latter also produced the song "Green Light" (2006). Jason Goldstein mixed "Kitty Kat" with assistance from Steve Tolle. Concerning the song, Knowles told MTV: "[Kitty Kat] is [a] very sexy [song], talking about a man who is out with friends all night and you're left at home. And you are like, 'No more of this. It's time to go.'" The song appeared online through the website of Rap-Up magazine on August 23, 2006, prior to the release of B'Day.

== Music and lyrics ==
"Kitty Kat"
A 22-second sample of "Kitty Kat", showing the 'I'm not feelin[g] it' vibe.

According to the sheet music published at Musicnotes.com by EMI Music Publishing, "Kitty Kat" is a smooth electro, hip hop soul and R&B song pacing in common time. The nearly four-minute long track is written in the key of D major. The song features a moderately slow groove of 78 beats per minute, with Beyoncé's vocals range spanning from the note of G♯_{3} to C_{5}. Spence D of IGN Music noted that the beat is down-tempo and this goes in contrast with the previous works of The Neptunes, who usually favors electro clash amplification. Jim DeRogatis of the Chicago Sun-Times noted that the song is similar to a Whitney Houston ballad while Andy Kellman of AllMusic commented that it could have been pulled from one of the first three albums by the American musical artist, Kelis.

In the song, the female protagonist feels that her love interest has underestimated her. This is demonstrated in the opening lines: "You know I hate sleepin[g] alone, but you said that you will soon be home. But baby, that was a long time ago." As the song progresses, she also wonders: "What about my body, body?/You don’t want my body, body." According to Sal Cinquemani of Slant Magazine, the female protagonist "literally packs up her pussy" and leaves the man who no longer seems interested in her, shown in the chorus lines: "Let's go, little kitty kat / I think it's time to go / He don't want you anymore." Similarly, Makkada B. Selah of The Village Voice noted that "Kitty Kat" was a threat for "jetting" and John Boone of E! Online commented that it was about Beyoncé's vagina. Eb Haynes of AllHipHop commented that "Kitty Kat" warns all restless boys that they too, become restless. Elysa Gardner of USA Today commented that the lyrics of the song include raw feelings for an unfaithful lover which are sung with "sass".

== Critical reception ==
"Kitty Kat" received generally favorable reviews from critics. Eb Haynes of AllHipHop described "Kitty Kat" as a seductive track. Norman Mayers of Prefix Magazine wrote that B'Day is packed with standouts such as "the Rich Harrison-produced 'Freakum Dress' and the Neptunes-helmed 'Kitty Kat'." Picking out "Kitty Kat" as one of the four top tracks of the album, Spence D of IGN Music added that the song slows things down, allowing for Beyoncé's "crystal clear vocals to take some down time and relinquish up a dreamy, creamy sound that is playfully sensuous." Andy Kellman of Allmusic described "Kitty Kat" as "a deceptively sweet, rainbow-colored track" where purrs - that are sound made by all species of felids and are a part of cat communication - are more like "claws-out dismissals." Jon Pareles of The New York Times called the song a "cooing [and] sighing" one. Sal Cinquemani of Slant Magazine noted that "Kitty Kat" was "the only mid-tempo break" until the very end of the album. Darryl Sterdan, writing for the Canadian website Jam!, said that the song is just about what you think. Thomas Inskeep of Stylus Magazine commented that "Kitty Kat" seems to be an obvious tracks produced by The Neptunes. He went on complimenting "the squishy R&B keyboard which works well with the song’s 'I’m not feelin[g] it' vibe." A writer of the Seattle Post-Intelligencer commented, "Beyoncé is better at being sexy than sarcastic, and 'Kitty Kat' doesn't make any bones about what her absentee lover is missing." Michael Roberts of New Times Broward-Palm Beach commented that Beyoncé "purrs at lower speed" in the song.

Phil Harrison of Time Out said that "Kitty Kat" feels "slightly anodyne despite its sweetly vicious climax." Gail Mitchell of Billboard described it as "slick, [and] wicked". Mike Joseph of PopMatters was much less impressed, giving the song a negative review: "The dreary 'Kitty Kat' is a waste of four minutes of my time. Pharrell Williams, who produced this song, needs to be told that his glory days are two years behind him if not more." This was echoed by Dave de Sylvi of Sputnikmusic who wrote: "Pharrell's other contribution to the album is the regrettably plain 'Kitty Kat,' a slower track that gives further credence to the view that he cannot cope when thrust outside his comfort zone."

== Music video ==
The music video for "Kitty Kat" was directed by Melina Matsoukas and co-directed by Beyoncé for the B'Day Anthology Video Album, which was released the same month. It was the first video of the eight videos shot in two weeks for the album. The music video for "Kitty Kat" is only one-minute long and it serves as the introduction for the music video of "Green Light". On the other hand, Matsoukas said that the half-day shoot for "Kitty Kat", by comparison, "was a breeze." Elaborating on the conception of the video, Beyoncé said: "We had the oversized kitty cat [in the video], which was so cute! I had to pretend it was there, because I was really in front of the green screen — I'd be on a big giant wooden cow and they superimposed a kitten. And we used leopard-print makeup and the catsuit and the nails to make me more like a cat. I really am a cat person".

Matsoukas told that getting the cats to cooperate was a difficult step. She told MTV: "They were definitely the most diva out of anybody. Those cats were mad. We had animal trainers, but you really can't train a cat." To get the effect of Beyoncé riding the cat, Matsoukas used a large plastic cow covered in a black fur drape for Beyoncé to perform on.

The video was originally going to be its own music video as seen in the behind the scenes of B'Day Anthology with Beyoncé wearing more outfits and shooting more scenes than shown. It begins with Beyoncé showing cat-like eyes with leopard print make-up and fashion on. In some parts of the clip, Beyoncé plays with an oversized ball of pink yarn and later plays with an oversized black cat. The clip ends with Beyoncé pulling the oversized cat on a gold chain off set and just immediately after that, the music video for "Green Light" begins. Rohin Guha of BlackBook magazine described the video as "deplorable". Sal Cinquemani of Slant Magazine described the video for "Kitty Kat" as "pure camp".

In 2013, John Boone and Jennifer Cady of E! Online placed the video at number five on their list of Beyoncé's ten best music videos, writing "It's Beyoncé running around with a giant cat! And then riding it! What more could you want from a music video?!".

== Live performance ==
Beyoncé performed "Kitty Kat" for the first time a capella on The Formation World Tour in Houston on May 7, 2016, almost ten years after the song was released. It was also performed in the same manner at her historic Coachella-headlining performance in 2018, and used in an interlude during the Renaissance World Tour.

== Credits and personnel ==
Credits are taken from B'Day liner notes.

- Vocals: Beyoncé Knowles
- Writing: Beyoncé Knowles, Shawn Carter, Pharrell Williams
- Producing: Pharrell Williams, Chad Hugo, Beyoncé Knowles
- Recording: Jim Caruana, Geoff Rice (Sony Music Studios, New York City), assisted by Rob Kinelski and Andrew Coleman (The Record Plant Studios, Los Angeles)
- Mixing: Jason Goldstein (Sony Music Studios, New York City), assisted by Steve Tolle

== Charts ==
Chart performance for "Kitty Kat"
Chart (2007)	Peak position
US Hot R&B/Hip-Hop Songs (Billboard)	66
