= The Beyoncé Experience Live =

2007 live video album by Beyoncé

Live album / video by Beyoncé
- Released: November 16, 2007
- Recorded: September 2, 2007
- Venues: Staples Center (Los Angeles, California)
- Genre: R&B
- Length: 123:01 (DVD); 95:31 (CD); 51:17 (Live instrumentals)
- Labels: Columbia; Music World
- Director: Nick Wickham

Beyoncé chronology
Irreemplazable (2007)	The Beyoncé Experience Live (2007)	I Am... Sasha Fierce (2008)

Beyoncé video chronology
B'Day Anthology Video Album (2007)	The Beyoncé Experience Live (2007)	Above and Beyoncé: Video Collection & Dance Mixes (2009)

The Beyoncé Experience Live is the third live and fourth video album by American singer and songwriter Beyoncé. It was released through Columbia Records and Music World Entertainment on November 16, 2007. It was filmed at the Staples Center in Los Angeles, California, on September 2, 2007 during her world tour The Beyoncé Experience. It features guest appearances from rapper Jay-Z on "Upgrade U" and former Destiny's Child bandmates Michelle Williams and Kelly Rowland on "Survivor". The show featured on the album was broadcast on different channels; for one night only on November 19, 2007, the film was shown in ninety-six theaters across the United States, while Black Entertainment Television (BET) aired an edited version of the concert on Thanksgiving Day, with AEG Network and 3sat also airing the concert.

The album features performances of songs from Beyoncé's first two solo studio albums Dangerously in Love (2003) and B'Day (2006) as well as songs which she recorded with Destiny's Child. Upon its release, The Beyoncé Experience Live received mostly positive reviews from music critics who praised Beyoncé's live performances of the songs. The album was also commercially successful, peaking at number two on the US Top Music Videos, and being certified triple platinum by the Recording Industry Association of America (RIAA). The live version of "Me, Myself and I" (2003) from the album gained a nomination for Grammy Award for Best Female R&B Vocal Performance at the 51st Annual Grammy Awards (2009). The show was re-enacted by American performer Neal Medlyn during his performance at the New Museum in New York City, New York in April 2008.

== Background and development ==
The Beyoncé Experience Live was filmed at the Staples Center in Los Angeles, California, on September 2, 2007, during Beyoncé's world tour The Beyoncé Experience, in promotion of her second studio album B'Day (2006). The film features guest appearances from rapper Jay-Z on "Upgrade U" and former Destiny's Child bandmates Michelle Williams and Kelly Rowland on "Survivor". At the end of the show Rowland and Williams led the audience in singing "Happy Birthday to You" to Beyoncé, to mark her birthday two days later. The film also features a twenty-seven-song jukebox feature which was achieved by the use of advanced "bitwise" programming. The DVD was authored by Neil Matthews at Ascent Media in New York City.

== Film synopsis ==
Onstage, Beyoncé had an all-female band Suga Mama, and the show used men only as dancers for the female audience as noted by Pareles of The New York Times. The show included many references such as to James Brown and Donna Summer as well as routines inspired by Sweet Charity and Marilyn Monroe. It opened in darkness with Beyoncé emerging through a hole in the stage amidst smoke, sparkles and pyrotechnics to perform "Crazy in Love" and a snippet of Gnarls Barkley's "Crazy" in a sparkling silver gown and walked to the front of the stage, as fifteen disco balls hung from the ceiling. Her background band started playing the music to the funk song and while singing, Beyoncé walked up a huge staircase which moved forward in two places where her all-female band and three backup singers were positioned. At the top of the staircase/mini-stage, she tore off the bottom of her dress and walked back down to the main stage. Her three backup singers came down as well and did the "uh-oh" dance from the song with her.

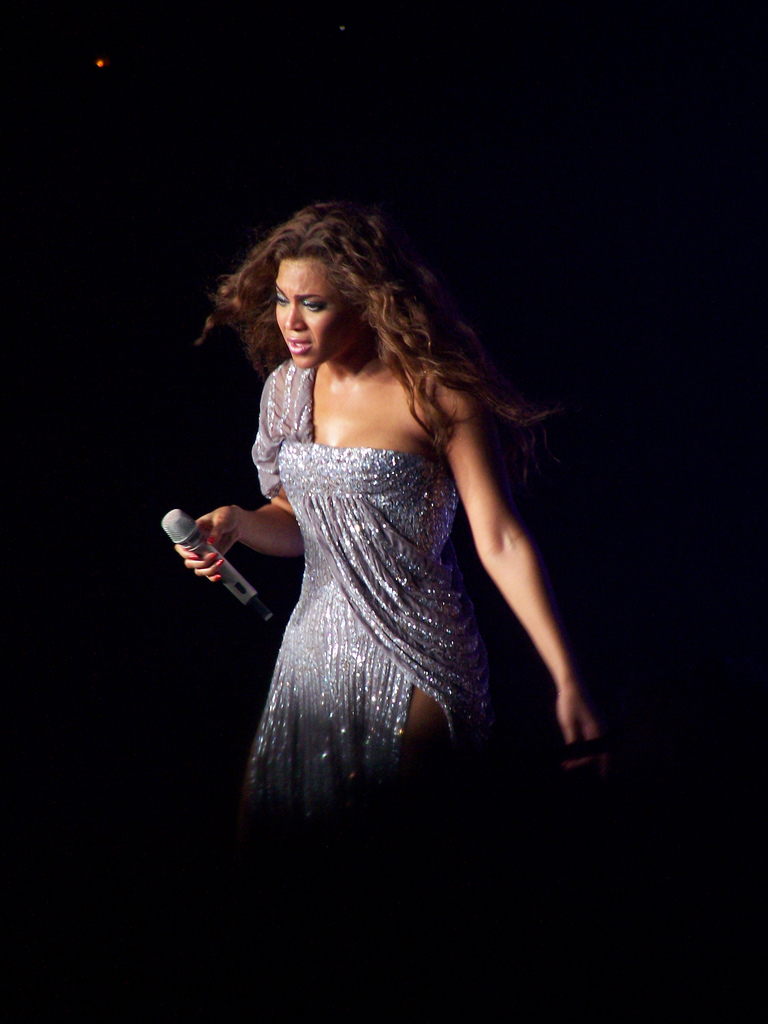
Beyoncé performing during The Beyoncé Experience at Palau Sant Jordi in Barcelona, Spain on May 27, 2007

During "Freakum Dress" Beyoncé played an air guitar, while the stage's stairs were lit green during "Green Light" which she performed with six female dancers. She wore a belly-dancing outfit, including harem pants, while singing "Baby Boy". She descended the staircase holding an umbrella and was met by three guys wearing fatigues. A short section of the reggae classic "Murder She Wrote" was incorporated into "Baby Boy". During "Beautiful Liar", Beyoncé sang into a microphone that fell from the ceiling and performed a Shakira-styled dance similar to the song's music video; Shakira appeared on the video screen throughout the song. "Naughty Girl" was also sung with Donna Summer's "Love to Love You Baby" being incorporated and while performing she belly-danced on the song's beat. "Me, Myself and I" was performed at a slower tempo than the original recording, after which Beyoncé sang "Dangerously in Love 2" with a snippet of "He Loves Me". She cried during "Flaws and All" and showed her "imperfections" before being embraced by a dancer dressed as an angel. During the performance of the song, she sang wide-eyed in a video close-up. Beyoncé sang "Speechless" while seated on a sofa designed like a pair of lips.

The intro to "Ring the Alarm" paid homage to the "Cell Block Tango" from the film Chicago, as women told of how they had been hurt by men and the performance saw Beyoncé wearing a red overcoat. During the performance of "Suga Mama", Beyoncé performed a pole dance. Afterwards Beyoncé's duets with Jay-Z – "Upgrade U" and "'03 Bonnie & Clyde" were performed. During "Get Me Bodied" she removed her robot costume to reveal black and yellow dress to emulate a bee and further led the crowd in a dance routine. "Check on It" was preceded by an instrumental of "The Pink Panther Theme", during which the stairs were colored pink. A Dreamgirls segment was performed, incorporating the title song and "Listen" from the 2006 musical film in which Beyoncé starred in. The final song on the tour's set list was "Irreplaceable"; it began with the audience singing the first verse to Beyoncé after she announced "I've been singing my heart out for over two hours. Now it's time for you to sing for me." Between segments of the show, Suga Mama performed periodic instrumental interludes, with every member giving a solo so Beyoncé could change her costumes seven times. The show included a ten-song Destiny's Child Medley which contained female solidarity-themed songs. As the concert ended, Beyoncé was walking on the stage and pointing to individual fans saying "I see you!" and describing their clothes or the signs they held.

== Release ==
The Beyoncé Experience Live was released in the United States on November 20, 2007, and in the United Kingdom on November 26. The album was also released on the iTunes Store on November 19, 2007, in an audio edition titled The Beyoncé Experience: Live Audio. The Blu-ray was released on November 18, 2008 simultaneously with Beyoncé's third studio album, I Am... Sasha Fierce. In some countries, the live DVD was packed with Irreemplazable as a bonus disc. Some of the concerts live version instrumentations were made available for digital download on March 25, 2008, and included the songs from "Speechless" onward. Although it is credited as various artists, technically the album is performed by Beyoncé's tour band Suga Mama. The Beyoncé Experience Live was shown at ninety-six cinemas across the United States on November 19, 2007, one day before its DVD release. Black Entertainment Television (BET) broadcast the show on Thanksgiving Day on November 22, 2007 and later on December 18 the same year. On December 31, 2007 The Beyoncé Experience Live was broadcast to members of the United States Army serving in the Iraq War through AEG Network. On December 31, 2008, European network 3sat aired the concert in Germany, Austria and Switzerland.

== Critical reception ==
Mark Deming of the website AllMusic commented that the album "captures her dazzling live act as she shines in a performance." A writer of MTV News commented that the album contained "more than two hours' worth of content in total". Kurt Orzeck of the same publication commented that the DVD showcases a "huge" tour. Scott Kara of Time Out also praised the "thrilling, booty-shaking pizzazz" of the DVD adding that fans would feel "just like being there [on the concert]". An editor of the website Jam! graded the album with four out of five stars, calling it a spectacle. The editor further noted: "[It] has the giant stage, the massive lights, the troupe of dancers, the kickass all-girl band, the costume changes, the VIPs and more. But all of it can't pull focus from the incredible Ms. Knowles, who works it for two-plus hours, wailing and gyrating through a sweat-soaked show with nary a hair out of place." Grading the album with three out of four stars, Chuck Arnold and Ivory Jeff Clinton from People magazine wrote: "The elaborate production gets a bit overblown at times, but in this concert... the tireless diva is a veritable force of nature on high-energy numbers such as 'Crazy in Love' and 'Déjà Vu.'"

== Accolades ==
The live version of "Me, Myself and I" (2003) from The Beyoncé Experience Live gained a nomination for Best Female R&B Vocal Performance at the 51st Annual Grammy Awards in 2009.

== Commercial performance ==
On the chart issue dated March 1, 2008, The Beyoncé Experience Live peaked at number two on the US Top Music Videos chart and it also stayed on the same position the next week, behind Celine Dion's Live in Las Vegas: A New Day... at number one. On December 8, 2007, the album debuted and peaked at number twenty-three on the US Digital Albums. It has been certified triple platinum by the Recording Industry Association of America (RIAA). The album appeared at numbers four, eight and thirty-one on the US Top Music Videos year-end chart for 2008, 2009 and 2010, respectively.

For the week ending November 26, 2007, The Beyoncé Experience Live peaked at number two on the Spanish Music DVD Chart. On December 1, 2007 the album debuted and peaked at number six on the Belgian Music DVD Chart, and stayed at that position for the following two weeks, and its last position was at number nine on December 22, 2007 before it fell out of the chart. On the Dutch Music DVD Chart, The Beyoncé Experience Live debuted at number three on December 1, 2007 and after almost a year of ascending and descending the chart, it became its peak position. It appeared on the Dutch Music DVD year-end charts in 2008 and 2009 at numbers twenty-two and forty-eight, respectively. On November 14, 2009, The Beyoncé Experience Live peaked at number twenty-five on the UK Music DVD Chart. On September 21, 2009, the album peaked at number eight on the Australian Music DVD Chart and was later certified double platinum by the Australian Recording Industry Association (ARIA).

== The Neal Medlyn Experience ==
American performer Neal Medlyn re-enacted the film during his performance at the New Museum in April 2008 together with dancers Will Rawls and Erick Montes. His performance was an hour long and titled The Neal Medlyn Experience Live. He sang along to the DVD audio track, complete with word-for-word between-song patter and band introductions. Booth Newspapers' Roger LeLeivre reviewed the re-enactment positively writing: "The event... was a hoot, and the audience loved every second of it. Medlyn has Beyoncé's signature, often spastic, moves down pat, down to each minute hand gesture and facial expression... Unlike a drag show, Medlyn does not try to convince anyone they are seeing Beyoncé. There wasn't much in the way of costumes (well, he did enter in a black wig, tube top and hot pants, but those bit the dust rather quickly), and why bother?". He concluded that the length of the show was "perfect" as it "ended before the shtick wore out its welcome". LeLeivre finished his review by writing, "It was a delicious pop-culture skewering, right down to the back-up dancers, with their over-the-top moves and expressions... Clearly it enhanced the 'experience,' if you had a passing acquaintance with Beyoncé's songs... but such knowledge was not a prerequisite to enjoying this homage". Claudia La Rocco of The New York Times described his re-enactment as "absurdly faithful" and added that it wouldn't have been nearly as "smart or touching" without the dancing of Rawls and Montes. She further put the performance in her list of the "richest" moments of 2008 and noted: "These astounding performers slipped between genders and among genres, enveloping Mr. Medlyn in utter fabulousness and proving just how sophisticated pop culture can be. Backup dancers everywhere should feel proud."

== Track listing ==
The Beyoncé Experience Live (DVD)
No.	Title	Length
1.	"Intro" (The Beyoncé Experience Fanfare)	1:08
2.	"Crazy in Love" (Crazy Mix)	4:08
3.	"Freakum Dress"	3:55
4.	"Green Light"	8:22
5.	"Baby Boy" (Reggae Medley)	4:10
6.	"Beautiful Liar"	2:25
7.	"Naughty Girl"	5:17
8.	"Me, Myself and I"	7:17
9.	"Dangerously in Love" (He Loves Me Mix)	7:10
10.	"Flaws and All"	4:19
11.	"Destiny's Child Medley" ("Independent Women Part 1" / "Bootylicious" / "No, No, No Part 2" / "Bug a Boo" (H-Town Screwed Down Mix) / "Bills, Bills, Bills" / "Cater 2 U" / "Say My Name" / "Jumpin', Jumpin'" / "Soldier (Soldier Boy Crank Mix) /"Survivor")	19:47
12.	"Speechless"	4:15
13.	"Ring the Alarm Intro Skit" (Jailhouse Confessions)	3:33
14.	"Ring the Alarm"	3:23
15.	"Suga Mama"	3:07
16.	"Upgrade U" (featuring Jay-Z)	4:19
17.	"'03 Bonnie & Clyde" (Beyoncé's Prince Mix)	1:16
18.	"Check on It" (Special Tour Version)	2:07
19.	"Déjà Vu"	7:07
20.	"Get Me Bodied"	5:06
21.	"Welcome to Hollywood"	2:28
22.	"Deena/Dreamgirls"	1:56
23.	"Listen"	3:07
24.	"Irreplaceable"	7:31
25.	"Beyoncé B'Day Surprise"	5:03
26.	"The Beyoncé Experience Credits" ("Beautiful Liar" live instrumental)	4:05
Total length:		123:01

Spanish and Latin American edition bonus disc (Irreemplazable)
No.	Title	Length
1.	"Amor Gitano" (with Alejandro Fernández)	3:48
2.	"Oye"	3:41
3.	"Irreemplazable"	3:48
4.	"Bello Embustero"	3:20
5.	"Beautiful Liar" (Remix; with Shakira)	3:01
6.	"Beautiful Liar" (Spanglish Version; featuring Sasha Fierce)	3:21
7.	"Irreemplazable" (Norteña Remix)	3:51
8.	"Get Me Bodied" (Timbaland Remix; featuring Julio Voltio)	6:14
Total length:		31:04

Japanese edition bonus disc
No.	Title	Length
1.	"Krazy in Luv" (featuring Jay-Z; Rockwilder Remix)	4:07
2.	"Baby Boy" (Junior Vasquez Club Anthem Remix)	8:52
3.	"Naughty Girl" (Calderone Quayle Club Mix Edit)	4:09
4.	"Me, Myself and I" (Bama Boyz Sexy Remix)	4:37
5.	"Green Light" (Freemasons Remix)	3:21
6.	"Ring the Alarm" (Tranzformas Remix; featuring Collie Buddz)	4:12
7.	"Déjà Vu" (Freemasons Radio Mix; featuring Jay-Z)	3:16
8.	"Get Me Bodied" (Timbaland Remix; featuring Fabolous)	4:50
9.	"Irreplaceable" (DJ Speedy Remix)	4:20
10.	"World Wide Woman"	3:42
11.	"ChampagneChroniKnightCap" (Performed by Solange Knowles)	4:53
Total length:		48:19

The Beyoncé Experience Live Audio
No.	Title	Length
1.	"Crazy in Love" (Medley)	5:29
2.	"Freakum Dress"	4:01
3.	"Green Light" (Medley)	3:37
4.	"Baby Boy" (Medley)	4:23
5.	"Beautiful Liar"	2:30
6.	"Naughty Girl" (Medley)	3:36
7.	"Me, Myself and I"	3:12
8.	"Dangerously in Love" (Medley)	7:00
9.	"Flaws and All"	4:23
10.	"Destiny's Child Medley" ("Independent Women Part 1" / "Bootylicious" / "No, No, No Part 2" / "Bug a Boo" / "Bills, Bills, Bills" / "Cater 2 U" / "Say My Name" / "Jumpin', Jumpin'" / "Soldier" / "Survivor")	19:47
11.	"Speechless"	3:35
12.	"Ring the Alarm"	2:41
13.	"Suga Mama"	3:08
14.	"Upgrade U"	4:31
15.	"'03 Bonnie & Clyde" (Medley)	1:36
16.	"Check on It"	1:56
17.	"Déjà Vu"	3:04
18.	"Get Me Bodied"	5:14
19.	"Welcome to Hollywood" (featuring Jay-Z)	2:32
20.	"Dreamgirls" (Medley)	5:08
21.	"Irreplaceable" (Medley)	7:38
Total length:		99:01

== Personnel ==
Credits adapted from The Beyoncé Experience Live's liner notes and AllMusic.

- Mike Abbott – audio engineer
- Glenn Ables – stage technician
- Richard J. Alcock – executive producer
- Calvin Aurand – executive producer
- Angela Beyincé – art assistant, assistant
- Beyoncé – primary artist, choreographer, concept, direction, executive producer, staging
- Jason Bridges – lighting technician
- Ed Burke – archivist
- Anthony Burrell – choreographer, dance director, dancer
- Kim Burse – concept, creative director
- Thom Cadley – mixing
- Jim Caruana – mixing
- Anthony Catalano – assistant engineer, digital editing
- Marcie Chapa – percussion
- Guy Charbonneau – engineer
- Quincy S. Jackson marketing
- Fusako Chubachi – art direction
- Justin Collie – lighting design, set design
- Justin Cook – production assistant
- Terry Cooley – stage manager
- Montina Cooper – vocals (background)
- Milan Dillard – dance director, dancer
- James Fahlgren – setup
- Michael Fellner – technical manager
- Charlie Fernández – unspecified contributor role
- Tia Fuller – sax (alto)
- Jennifer García – layout design
- Max Gousse – A&R
- Todd Green – organ
- Georgette Harvey – gaffer
- Ty Hunter – assistant hair stylist
- Jay-Z – guest artist, primary artist
- Mark Johnson – camera operator
- Harold Jones – production coordination
- Chris Keating – video director
- Chris Keene – lighting technician
- Mathew Knowles – executive producer, management
- Tina Knowles – stylist
- Dave Levisohn – camera operator
- Yanira Marin – dancer
- Divinity Roxx -bass, musical director
- Bibi McGill – guitar, musical direction, musical director
- James "McGoo" McGregor – drum technician
- Steve Miles – camera operator
- Ramon Morales – monitor engineer
- Heather Morris – dancer
- Doug Neal – stage manager
- Emer Patten – producer
- Danielle Polanco – choreographer
- Matt Powers – script supervisor
- Justin Purser – production coordination
- Dan Ricci – audio post-production
- Jerry Rogers – camera operator, projection
- Kelly Rowland – guest artist
- Todd Sams – choreographer
- Jamie Silk – production assistant
- Kate Sinden – production coordination
- Ryan Smith – mastering
- Kim Thompson – drums
- Francesca Tolot – make-up
- Crystal Torres – trumpet
- Benny Trickett – editing
- Jennifer Turner – coordination
- Cristina Villarreal – wardrobe
- Horace Ward – engineer
- Nick Wickham – director
- Michelle Williams – guest artist
- Mike "Hitman" Wilson – unknown contributor role
- Travis Wilson – unspecified contributor role
- Nyle Wood – sound technician
- John Zweifel – stage technician

== Charts ==
=== Weekly charts ===
Chart (2007–09)	Peak position
Australian Music DVD (ARIA)	8
Belgian Music DVD (Ultratop Flanders)	6
Brazilian Music DVD (PMB)	1
Czech Music DVD (ČNS IFPI)	14
Dutch Music DVD (MegaCharts)	3
French Music DVD (SNEP)	12
Greek Music DVD (IFPI Greece)	45
Italian Albums (FIMI)	14
Japanese Albums (Oricon)	22
Spanish Music DVD (PROMUSICAE)	3
Swedish Music DVD (Sverigetopplistan)	14
UK Music Videos (OCC)	22
US Digital Albums (Billboard)	23
US Music Videos (Billboard)	2

=== Year-end charts ===
Chart (2007)	Position
Dutch Music DVD (MegaCharts)	44

Chart (2008)	Position
Belgian Music DVD (Ultratop Flanders)	24
Dutch Music DVD (MegaCharts)	22
US Music Videos (Billboard)	4

Chart (2009)	Position
Australian Music DVD (ARIA)	19
Brazilian Music DVD (PMB)	15
Dutch Music DVD (MegaCharts)	48
US Music Videos (Billboard)	8

Chart (2010)	Position
Brazilian Music DVD (PMB)	5
US Music Videos (Billboard)	31

== Certifications ==
Region	Certification	Certified units/sales
Australia (ARIA)	2× Platinum	30,000^{^}
Brazil (Pro-Música Brasil)	2× Platinum	60,000^{*}
Portugal (AFP)	Gold	4,000^{^}
Spain (Promusicae)	Gold	10,000^{^}
United Kingdom (BPI)	Gold	25,000^{^}
United States (RIAA)	3× Platinum	300,000^{^}
^{*} Sales figures based on certification alone.^{^} Shipments figures based on certification alone.

== Release history ==
Release dates and formats for The Beyoncé Experience Live
Region	Date	Edition(s)	Format(s)	Label(s)	Ref.
Germany	November 16, 2007	Standard	DVD	Sony BMG	
Australia	November 19, 2007	Standard	DVD	Sony BMG	
Australia	November 19, 2007	Audio	Digital download	Sony BMG	
France	November 19, 2007	Standard	DVD	Sony BMG	
United States	November 20, 2007	Standard	DVD	Columbia; Music World	
United Kingdom	November 26, 2007	Standard	DVD	RCA	
Japan	November 28, 2007	Standard	CD+DVD	Sony Music Japan	
Germany	February 22, 2008	Standard	Blu-ray	Sony BMG	
United States	March 25, 2008	Instrumental	Digital download	Columbia; Music World	
United States	November 18, 2008	Standard	Blu-ray	Columbia; Music World	
France	January 27, 2009	Standard	Blu-ray	Sony Music	
United Kingdom	January 27, 2009	Standard	Blu-ray	RCA	
