= Samsung SPH-M620 =

Mobile phone model

- Manufacturer: Samsung Electronics
- Availability by region: March 2007
- Compatible networks: CDMA 800/1900, EVDO
- Form factor: Candybar
- Dimensions: 4.1×1.7×0.35 in (104.1×43.2×8.9 mm) (10.4 * 4.3 * 0.9 cm)
- Weight: 2.6 oz (70 g)
- Memory: 45.3 MB
- Removable storage: MicroSD
- Battery: 800 mAh Lithium ion
- Rear camera: 1.3 Megapixel VGA
- Display: 176 X 220 px TFT LCD, 262k colors
- Connectivity: Bluetooth, USB

The Samsung SPH-M620 (Upstage in the United States) is a feature phone manufactured by Samsung. The phone is carried by Sprint Nextel in the United States, and by Bell Mobility, MTS, Telus and TBayTel in Canada. In Canada, the phone is sold as the M620 and the M620 Music Edition, with the Music Edition coming with high quality earphones and a 2 GB microSD card.

The Samsung M620 is a bar phone with two unique sides. One side is a typical numeric keypad with a small screen for making phone calls, navigating contacts, and sending text messages. The other side of the phone is specifically for playing music, surfing the web, and viewing interactive content. This side also includes a touch sensitive pad for menu navigation. The phone also includes a 1.3 megapixel camera, a microSD slot for up to 2 gigabytes of storage, and Bluetooth compatibility for wireless communication.

The phone's design is rather unusual and requires users to press a "Flip" button on the side of the phone when switching between the phone side and media side which has been frequently criticized.
