= Green Light (Beyoncé song) =

2007 single by Beyoncé

Single by Beyoncé

from the album B'Day
- Released: July 27, 2007
- Recorded: April 2006
- Studio: Sony Music Studios (New York City)
- Genre: Funk; R&B
- Length: 3:29
- Label: Columbia
- Songwriters: Beyoncé Knowles; Pharrell Williams; Garrett Hamler
- Producers: Beyoncé; The Neptunes

Beyoncé singles chronology
"Get Me Bodied" (2007)	"Green Light" (2007)	"Until the End of Time" (2007)

Music video
- "Green Light" on YouTube

"Green Light" is a song by American singer Beyoncé. The song was written by Beyoncé, Sean Garrett, and Pharrell for Beyoncé's second solo studio album, B'Day (2006). Produced by the Neptunes, it was released as the fourth UK and sixth overall single on July 27, 2007 through Columbia Records. "Green Light" is an R&B-funk song with lyrics detailing a break-up song in which the female protagonist gives her love interest the permission to move out. The song also finds Beyoncé using a fairly aggressive tone. A remix of the song features American rapper Young Buck, and was produced by Swizz Beatz.

"Green Light" was well received by music critics who universally praised the beat, bass, groove, and angry tone used by Beyoncé in the song. The single performed moderately on charts, peaking at number twelve on the UK Singles Chart and at number 46 in Ireland. The Freemasons remix of the track peaked at number eighteen on the Dutch Top 40 chart. The single's accompanying music video was directed by Melina Matsoukas and co-directed by Beyoncé. It is inspired by Robert Palmer's 1985 music video "Addicted to Love". Beyoncé considered the video (which is her second to feature her all-female tour band Suga Mama) her toughest shoot. The song was a part of the set list on her world tour the Beyoncé Experience (2007).

== Background and release ==
After filming Dreamgirls in which Beyoncé landed a major role, she went on a month-long vacation. On the break she went to the studio to start working on her second solo album, B'Day. She was inspired by her role and she "had so many things bottled up, so many emotions, so many ideas". Beyoncé contacted American singer Sean Garrett, who had worked with her in Destiny's Child and on her 2006 single "Check on It". Together with Pharrell, who had also previously collaborated with Beyoncé, Garrett was booked to Sony Music Studios in New York City, each had studio to work in. The track was co-produced by Beyoncé and The Neptunes, along with "Kitty Kat", and was recorded by Jim Caruana and mixed by Jason Goldstein at the same studio.

In June 2006, Beyoncé invited Tamara Coniff of Billboard magazine to a New York recording studio. There she premiered several songs from the album including "Ring the Alarm" (2006) and "Freakum Dress" (2006), which both were cited as possible second singles, to be released in the United States only. At the same time, she revealed that "Green Light" and "Get Me Bodied" (2007), were planned to be released as the next two international/third US singles from B'Day, following the release of the lead single "Déjà Vu" (2006). However, she ultimately opted for "Ring the Alarm" (2006) as the second single to be released in the United States only while "Irreplaceable" (2006) was officially serviced as the album's second international/third US single. "Green Light" was released later in the United Kingdom on July 30, 2007 as the seventh overall single, following the international release "Beautiful Liar" (2007). Along with the release of the single, a digital EP featuring remixes from the English production team Freemasons, was made available on July 27, 2007 as an online digital download.

== Music and lyrics ==
"Green Light"
A 21-second sample of "Green Light", a song with futuristic funk elements. The song uses repetitive vocal lines, as well as the line, "Give it to mama".

"Green Light" is an R&B-funk song performed with "vivace" tempo. According to the sheet music published at Musicnotes.com by EMI Music Publishing, the song is written in the key of A minor with a moderate groove of 132 beats per minute. The chord follows the Fm-G♭ key series with an occasional shift to additional B♭m_{7}. Beyoncé's vocals range from the note of C♯_{4} to F_{5}. The song is built on a ripping bassline and features "a more organic" beat. Green Light" features "uh-huh huh huh" vocals and uses brassy stabs which a reviewer from Guardian Unlimited found to be a "direct echo to 'Crazy in Love'." According to The London Paper, the "uh-oh-oh-oh-oh" vocals in "Green Light" is an "imitation of Amerie's performance" in her 2005 single "1 Thing". "Green Light" also displays Latin percussion as well as sampled soul horns, and uses a fairly aggressive tone. Conforming to Jon Pareles of The New York Times, "Green Light" is a break-up song in which the female protagonist gives her love interest the permission to move out. This is shown in the lines of the hook: "Go! Go!" The lyrics are constructed in the traditional verse-chorus form. The song starts with an intro in which Beyoncé sings, "Give it to mama". Jaime Gill of Yahoo! Music commented that "Green Light" seems to be all "slink and minimalism before a surging come-on of a chorus." It follows the verse-chorus-verse-verse-chorus pattern giving way to the bridge. Beyoncé repeats the chorus, ending the song.

== Critical reception ==
"Green Light" received highly positive reception from critics. Eb Haynes of AllHipHop referred to "Green Light" as a "classic Pharrell-Neptunes groove". Andy Kellman of Allmusic described the track as an "ambitious, fleet-footed number that continually switches tempos and sounds". Spence D. of IGN music stated, "'Green Light' brings things back down to pseudo earthiness; both with the slightly more organic sounding Neptunes beat." He felt that the "rippling bassline sounds really familiar, like it's been used in other Neptunes' produced tracks before".... Jaime Gill of Yahoo! Music said that "Green Light" is "the best thing Pharrell and co have done in a long, long while." Roger Friedman of Fox News Channel considered "Green Light" as his second choice as the song having the greatest potential to become a massive hit after "Irreplaceable" (2006). Thomas Inskeep of Stylus Magazine gave a mixed review for the song commenting that it's one of the "tired random-percussion tracks [...] that goes nowhere."

== Commercial performance ==
With the album version of the song being available digitally as soon as the album was released, "Green Light" debuted on the UK Singles Chart at number 152 after the video aired in early July 2007, and then rose to number seventy-eight on July 28, 2007. Because of heavy radio airplay of the Freemasons remix, as soon as it was available, the song climbed sixty places from number seventy-seven to number seventeen on August 11, 2007, and then to number twelve, giving Beyoncé her eleventh top twenty hit in the United Kingdom. "Green Light" became Beyoncé's highest charting single on downloads alone on the UK Singles Chart without a prominent featured artist. The UK commercial CD single was cancelled at the last minute, which means it did not receive a physical release. This explains why the single failed to reach a higher position. "Green Light" stayed on the chart for nine weeks. In Ireland, the single debuted at number forty-six on August 23, 2007, and dropped off the chart a week later. The Freemasons remix of the track debuted at number thirty on the Dutch Top 40 chart on September 8, 2007. It propelled to number nineteen, and peaked at number eighteen on September 29, 2007. It remained on the chart for six weeks. On the other hand, the album version of "Green Light" peaked at number twenty on the Dutch Mega Single Top 100 on September 22, 2007.

== Music video ==
Beyoncé with her back-up dancers on their toes; she considered the scene her toughest shoot, giving her blistered feet and muscle spasms.

The music video for "Green Light" was directed by Melina Matsoukas and co-directed by Beyoncé. Filmed in early 2007, it was one of the videos shot in two weeks for the B'Day Anthology Video Album (2007) and was one out of eight previously unseen clips. "Green Light" was the third video shot during the sessions. The clip was inspired mainly by Robert Palmer's 1985 music video "Addicted to Love" with its "stone-faced models pretending to play guitars". "Green Light" was considered by Beyoncé as a modern version of the video because they used the instruments as props.

Beyoncé also revealed that the scenes reminded her of Vanity 6. A short "Kitty Kat" clip opens the "Green Light" video. Beyoncé considered "Green Light" the "toughest video" to shoot. Besides the latex rubber clothing, she and her back-up dancers had to wear ballet-pointe heels. The shoes blistered her feet and gave muscle spasms due to the 18-hour session. Beyoncé invited her all-female tour band, Suga Mama, to make their second appearance in a video after their debut performance on the music video for "Irreplaceable" (2006). The video was posted on the MTV Overdrive on March 28, 2007.

== Live performances ==
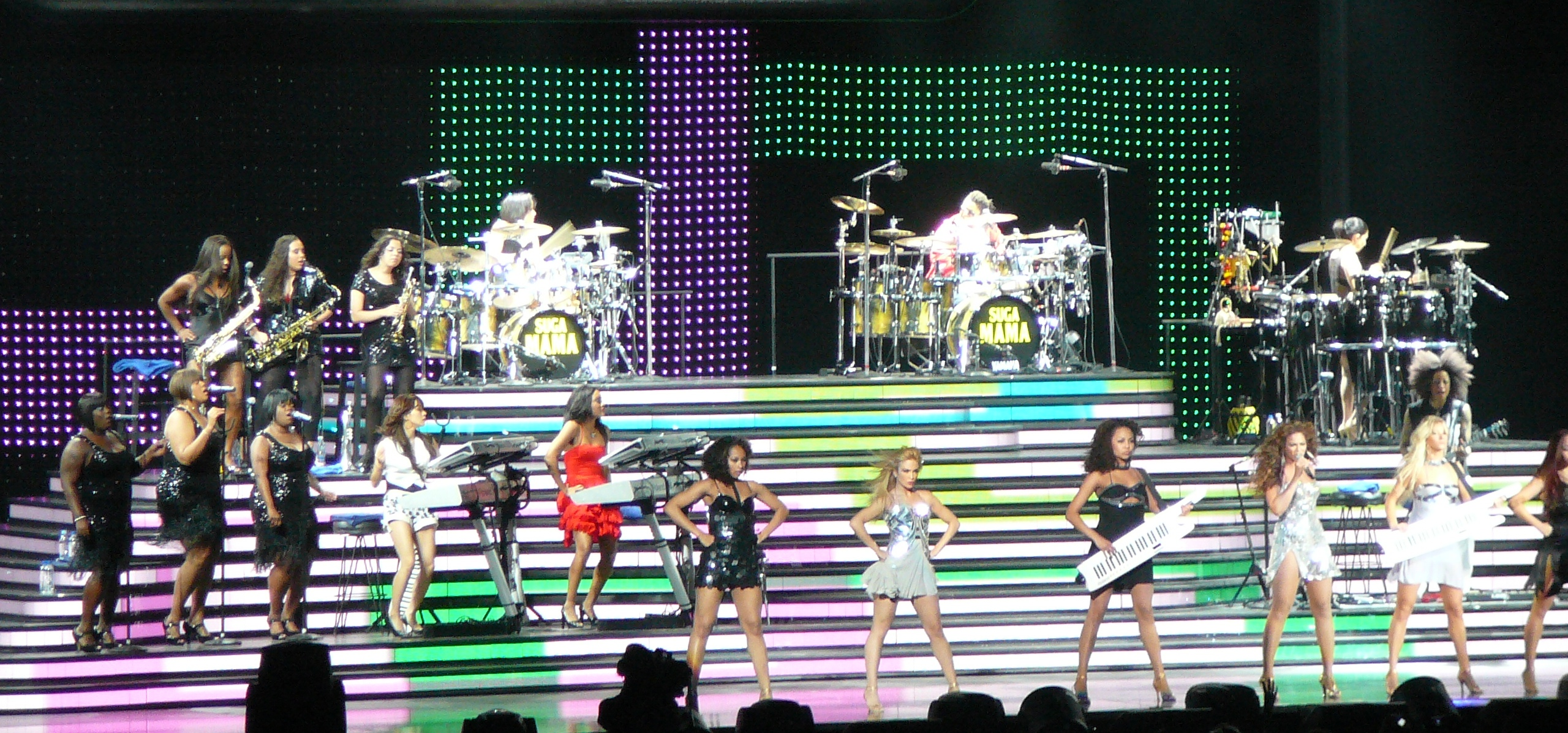
Beyoncé singing "Green Light", backed with her performing ensemble, during The Beyoncé Experience world concert tour (2007).

On September 6, 2006, Beyoncé promoted the album B'Day with a performance of "Green Light" on Good Morning America. On April 2, 2007 she also appeared on the Today Show, to promote the deluxe edition of B'Day, which was released the following day. Beyoncé sang the Spanglish version of "Irreplaceable" and "Green Light". The song was included as a part of her set list on The Beyoncé Experience. On August 5, 2007, Beyoncé performed the song at the Madison Square Garden in Manhattan, wearing a sparkly silver dress with a long train. For the performance, Beyoncé also brought out her squad of six female dancers. According to Shaheem Reid of MTV News, all the women moved with the precision "of a Navy Seal strike force", slaying the crowd with their synchronized dances. Jon Pareles of The New York Times praised the performance, stating: "Beyoncé needs no distractions from her singing, which can be airy or brassy, tearful or vicious, rapid-fire with staccato syllables or sustained in curlicued melismas. But she was in constant motion, strutting in costumes [...]". According to Tonya Turner of The Courier-Mail, the performance of "Green Light", "moved fans to screams of endearment." In Los Angeles, Beyoncé gave a full-length performance of the song, dressed in a sparkly silver dress with a long train. It was executed with several female backup dancers, and live instrumentation. "Green Light" was included as on her live album The Beyoncé Experience Live (2007).

== Track listings and formats ==
- Digital download
1. "Green Light" – 3:29
2. "Green Light" (Freemasons Remix) – 3:19
3. "Green Light" (Remix featuring Young Buck) - 4:19
- UK Freemasons Digital EP
1. "Green Light" (Freemasons Remix) – 3:19
2. "Beautiful Liar" (Freemasons Club Remix) (featuring Shakira) – 7:31
3. "Déjà Vu" (Freemasons Radio Mix) (featuring Jay-Z) – 3:15
4. "Ring the Alarm" (Freemasons Club Mix Radio Edit) – 3:26

== Credits and personnel ==
Credits are taken from B'Day's liner notes.

- Andrew Coleman – assistant recording
- Jim Caruana – recording
- Sean Garrett – writing
- Jason Goldstein – mixing
- Rob Kinelski – assistant recording
- Beyoncé – writing, production
- The Neptunes – production
- Steve Tolle – assistant mixing
- Pharrell Williams – writing

== Charts ==
=== Weekly charts ===
Weekly chart performance for "Green Light"
Chart (2007)	Peak position
Belgium (Ultratip Bubbling Under Flanders)	10
CIS Airplay (TopHit)	14
Croatia International Airplay (HRT)	7
European Hot 100 Singles (Billboard)	59
Ireland (IRMA)	46
Netherlands (Dutch Top 40) Freemasons club mix	18
Netherlands (Single Top 100)	20
Russia Airplay (TopHit) Freemasons remix	19
UK Singles (Official Charts) Freemasons club mix	12

=== Year-end charts ===
2007 year-end chart performance for "Green Light"
Chart (2007)	Position
CIS (TopHit)	55
Russia Airplay (TopHit) Freemasons remix	126

2008 year-end chart performance for "Green Light"
Chart (2008)	Position
CIS (TopHit)	70
Russia Airplay (TopHit) Freemasons remix	63

=== Decade-end charts ===
Decade-end chart performance for "Green Light"
Chart (2000–2009)	Position
CIS Airplay (TopHit)	118
Russia Airplay (TopHit) Freemasons remix	104

== Certifications ==
Certifications for Green Light
Region	Certification	Certified units/sales
United Kingdom (BPI)	Silver	200,000^{‡}
^{‡} Sales+streaming figures based on certification alone.

== Release history ==
Release dates and formats for "Green Light"
Region	Date	Format(s)	Label(s)	Ref.
Australia	July 27, 2007	Digital download	Sony BMG	
Spain	July 27, 2007	Digital download (EP)	Sony BMG	
United States	July 27, 2007	Digital download (EP)	Columbia; Music World	
United Kingdom	July 30, 2007	Digital download	RCA	
