= Kahlil Joseph =

American actor

- Born: Kahlil Iohann Joseph; New Delhi, India
- Citizenship: United States of America
- Occupations: Actor in film, stage, television, voice-over; singer; martial artist; dialect coach; teacher
- Years active: 1998–present
- Website: kahliljoseph.com

Kahlil Joseph (pronounced "Kha-leel") is an American film, television and stage actor and teacher of performing arts. He has worked extensively in the United States and India. Joseph is based in Los Angeles.

== Early life ==
Joseph was born in New Delhi, India, but moved shortly after to Sydney, Australia with his parents for five years.

While in Sydney, Joseph did his first play, acting as Noah in a production of "Noah's Ark," sparking a love for performing and learning about the art. Joseph had an extremely keen ear for sound since childhood, and would continually mimic everyone and everything he could.

Joseph was constantly encouraged to read books that were advanced for his age. His parents introduced him to various authors, to build his interests and knowledge of other cultures and people.

In 1983, Joseph moved back to New Delhi with his parents and attended St. Columba's School, Delhi. By the age of 9, trained extensively in voice and diction by his father, Joseph started consistently winning inter-school declamation and debate championships, which continued till the time he was 17.

Simultaneously, at the age of 7, Joseph began a lifelong practice of another discipline that has had a profound effect on his work and person to this day – the martial arts. When Joseph watched the legendary Bruce Lee in Enter the Dragon, he was inspired immediately by the way Lee so expressed himself through his physicality and movement. Starting with Shotokan Karate, Joseph branched into Tae Kwon Do, Hung Gar Kung Fu, and boxing. He competed on a semi-contact and full-contact amateur level.

Joseph earned his first Bachelor of Arts in English Literature from Ramjas College, University of Delhi, India. During his studies, he was the lead singer for various heavy metal and hard rock bands in New Delhi. He learned and developed a high respect during this time for such a type of singer, whom he believes needs even more vocal and physical strength and resilience than a speaker or singer of another genre.

== Career ==
=== Acting career (India) ===
Following college, Joseph was cast as Jean Valjean in a Delhi production of the acclaimed Broadway musical Les Misérables in 1998, which turned out to be his musical theater success in New Delhi. Training to sing in this show was a huge learning experience for him, as he now needed to sing a completely different style from his usual gigs – classical operatic. This also improved his speaking voice remarkably.

His performance got him noticed by a casting director for a new primetime TV drama series Khwahish, and in 1999, he joined the show as its antagonistic fashion designer Ronaldo. He continued his role and also played Zach in the Indian premiere of the stage musical A Chorus Line at Kamani Auditorium, Delhi, until he left India in August 1999.

=== Acting career (USA; 1999–2003) ===
Joseph had always wanted to work as an actor in the United States. So, in spite of Bollywood on the horizon, he packed his bags and headed to Concord University in Athens, West Virginia as a student. By this time, he wanted to learn more about the American acting industry and find work in Hollywood and the American stage while pursuing his second Bachelor of Arts degree, this time in Communication Arts (Theater & Broadcasting). From the time he entered the U.S., Joseph managed to consistently break ethnic and racial bounds as an actor through his quick ability with multiple accents and physical skills by being cast in many roles that were not originally written for an Indian actor.

In 2001 and 2002, Joseph played the characters Blue Jacket and Wasegoboah in the acclaimed outdoor drama Tecumseh! in Chillicothe, Ohio. In 2003, Joseph starred as Talvin in the feature film Far From India, which had a gala premiere at the Weinberg Center for the Arts in Frederick, Maryland.

By the time he graduated summa cum laude from Concord University, Joseph had worked professionally in the vocally demanding arena of outdoor drama and film, learned to ride horses, choreograph fights for the stage and film, and gotten accepted into a competitive graduate class of 10 actors at the prestigious UCLA School of Theater, Film and Television, where he earned his Master of Fine Arts (MFA) in Acting in 2006.

=== Acting career (USA; 2003–2010) ===
Since Joseph moved to Los Angeles in 2003 to pursue his MFA in Acting, he played Faruq Abdullah in the acclaimed play The Road To Damascus in 2004, which was critically praised in the LA Weekly by Sandra Ross (October 22, 2004) commenting how "Joseph and … deliver persuasive performances …". In 2005, he made his debut on American television on E! as Martin Bashir in The Michael Jackson Trial, as well as lent his voice to the acclaimed Naked In Ashes, a feature-length documentary about yogis in India, which premiered at the NuArt Theatre. In the same year, Joseph was also featured as a guest celebrity on the Showbiz India Xtreme program.

In 2006, Joseph played a lead role as Ibrahim Shaalan in the action feature film Special Ops: Delta Force, acting alongside English actor Mark Ryan. Joseph also guest starred as Resident Amer in the TV series Untold Stories of the ER. In October 2006, Joseph joined the cast of the hit television daytime drama Days of Our Lives for a month in a recurring guest star role as Dr. Myers. Joseph's character played the specialist who is desperately searching for a cure to save the poisoned characters Kayla Johnson and Steve Johnson. On Thanksgiving Day 2006, Joseph appeared as a real-life Christian evangelical preacher seeking asylum in America in the television special Thanksgiving USA, hosted by Pat Boone. Joseph also lent his presence to two national commercials in the fall of 2006, one for the U.S. Army and the other for Chrysler, both of which ran till 2008.

In January 2007, Joseph was the main character in the Season 6 opening of the TV drama 24 (episode Day 6: 6:00 am – 7:00 am). In the summer of that year, Joseph played villain Mahmoud Bashir in the play The Conex at the Write Act Theatre in Hollywood, California.

In January 2008, Joseph guest starred with his voice on the TV series Zoey 101 (episode "Trading Places") as Roger, the tech support employee who frustrates lead character Chase Matthews endlessly using his trademark question "Have you tried pressing Control G???" Joseph then played train engineer Cutty Nagim accused of foul play in the TV series Numb3rs (episode "Thirty-Six Hours") in November 2008. During this time, Joseph played a predatory pornographer, aptly called The C*nt, in the controversial play Money Shot. Joseph's work was highly praised in Variety (magazine) (November 4, 2008) by Bob Verini, who noted that "Explosions always threaten from a cast in constant motion, especially from … Kahlil Joseph as the industry's preeminent videographer in a hilarious sendup of every egotistical auteur who ever pulled a hissy fit on set".

Joseph enjoyed one of his favorite television roles in the TV series Leverage. In the episode "The Juror No. 6 Job", he played a con man, Avi/Donnie, a good friend of lead character Eliot Spencer, played by actor Christian Kane. Joseph also portrayed heroin dealer Omar in the feature film La Linea, which stars Ray Liotta, Andy García, and Danny Trejo. In October 2009, he played The Bank Manager who aids lead detectives Rick Castle and Kate Beckett in catching the killer in the TV series Castle (episode "Fool Me Once").

Joseph appeared in Desperate Housewives (episode "The Glamorous Life") in January 2010.

Joseph's voice talents were heard in the film Eat Pray Love starring Julia Roberts, released on August 13, 2010.

=== Legally Blonde The Musical (US and Canada; 2010–2011) ===
Joseph co-starred as the villainous Professor Callahan in the 2nd National US/Canada Tour of Legally Blonde. For nine months from September 21, 2010 till May 15, 2011, he performed 242 shows in 96 cities and travelled 35,050 miles. He was the youngest and first actor of color to play the role.

Throughout the tour, the press strongly praised Joseph's performances: in Metromix Columbus (September 28, 2010), Dwayne Steward noted that "Kahlil Joseph is creepiness personified as Professor Callahan"; in The Columbus Dispatch (September 29, 2010), Margaret Quamme wrote that "Joseph (made) a believably predatory lawyer"; Erin Millar of Examiner.com (September 29, 2010) believed "Kahlil Joseph does the slimy Professor Callahan justice (no pun intended) – the general opinion of this character was very clear in the audience"; Richard Ades of The Other Paper noted how "Some cast members do distinguish themselves, especially ... Kahlil Joseph as the hard-edged Professor Callahan" (September 29, 2010); Debbie Blassingame Hale of Chattanooga Times Free Press observed "Several standouts in the cast include: ... Kahlil Joseph as Professor Callahan" (September 18, 2010); George Walker of Indiana Public Media commented how "Kahlil Joseph is mean and lascivious as Professor Callahan" (October 20, 2010); Sue Merrell of The Grand Rapids Press remarked that "As Professor Callahan, Kahlil Joseph demands respect and is so smooth that you're not sure at first if he's villain or hero" (November 24, 2010); in Around The Town Chicago, M.D. Horn took note of "Kahlil Joseph, who instills fear in his students as Professor Callahan" (December 5, 2010); in Le Droit, a newspaper in Ottawa, Canada, critic Annik Chainey referred to Joseph as "the ruthless Professor Callahan" (December 29, 2010); Iris Winston of the Capital Critics' Circle in Ottawa, Canada commented on "Kahlil Joseph as Professor Callahan (being a) strong counterpoint(s) in the female-dominated cast" (January 2, 2011); Sarah Cure of The Huntsville Times strongly commended Joseph: "Kahlil Joseph, who plays Callahan, does a superb job telling his students in song that they need to be "sharks" rather than chum" (January 9, 2011); Tracy Poindexter-Canton of The Spokesman-Review wrote that "Performances by other cast members worth mentioning include ... Kahlil Joseph's (Professor Callahan) debonair rendition of 'Blood in the Water'" (February 12, 2011); Ana Osorio of The Sound and Noise, a Canadian magazine, stated: "The acting was quite good as well. A particular scene that stood out was professor's Callahan first lecture, which actor Kahlil Joseph played convincingly, with the song 'Blood in the Water'— also one of the best songs in the musical." (March 3, 2011); John Jane of ReviewVancouver offered the following praise: "The oldest cast member Kahlil Joseph, who has the only serious role, is impressively pompous as the lofty, gung-ho law professor. His tongue-in-cheek delivery of Blood in the Water was sublime." (March 5, 2011); in a tougher review, T.D. Mobley-Martinez for MSNBC and Colorado Springs Gazette appreciated Joseph's work, writing: "High points: Kahlil Joseph's performance as the corrupt professor: On point and completely understandable." (March 10, 2011); William Kerns of Lubbock Avalanche-Journal observed how "Kahlil Joseph also provides an intimidating law school introduction by singing 'Blood in the Water'" (April 2, 2011); Lindsay Christians of The Capital Times likened Joseph's portrayal of Professor Callahan to a snake: "Kahlil Joseph practically slithers across the stage as Professor Callahan. His buttery baritone is a perfect match for the sinister 'Blood in the Water'.". Nanciann Cherry of the Toledo Blade felt that Joseph's performance was uncomfortably realistic, noting how "Joseph's Professor Callahan is almost too believable as a brilliant but ultimately sleazy attorney.".

As Professor Callahan, Joseph was also extremely popular and requested frequently for interviews. He was interviewed as a special guest by the following TV and radio stations and newspapers: on television, Joseph spoke with – Mike Sobel of Global Television Network on February 24, 2011 in Edmonton, Canada; Lisa Colbert of Fox News Channel on September 29, 2010 on the Columbus section of the Good Day; Sean Lehosit of UWeekly on September 22, 2010; Tim Doty of WXMI in Grand Rapids, Michigan on November 23, 2010; on the radio, Joseph's favorite interview was with Greg Batton and Dan Diorio of WMBD (AM) radio in Peoria, Illinois on November 30, 2010, other radio stations that interviewed Joseph included KBCY, KCDD, KVUU, K97 in Edmonton, Canada, KXLY (AM), WBGA, WCAP (AM), WWRR, WVAQ, and WTCB; in print, Joseph was interviewed by – Sarah Henning of Lawrence Journal-World on December 1, 2010; Dan Lea of The Idaho Press-Tribune on January 31, 2011 in 'Boise Goes Blonde!'; Michael Bowen of The Pacific Northwest Inlander in 'Blonde Justice' on February 9, 2011; Laurie Allred of Daily Bruin on January 4, 2011. Joseph's favorite interviews were with Michael Bowen of The Pacific Northwest Inlander in 'The Professor Is a Professor' on February 12, 2011, where Joseph opened up about himself and his life on the road and as an actor; and especially in a three-part interview with Jenna Marynowski of The Sound and Noise on March 15, 2011, March 24, 2011, and April 10, 2011, where Joseph talked in great educational detail about his process of acting.

=== Teaching career ===
Along with his acting career, Joseph worked as a teacher of a variety of performing arts. He was on the faculty of the UCLA School of Theater, Film and Television from 2007–2008, with the title of Visiting Assistant Professor, where he taught voice and speech to the undergraduate senior acting and musical theater students. He continues to privately train performers and non-performers in acting, accents and dialects, voice, speech and combat (for stage/screen, as well as real life).

=== Martial arts ===
Joseph trains in and teaches multiple-system self-defense, consisting of Muay Thai, mixed martial arts, Brazilian Jiu-Jitsu, and Savate, all in conjunction with the core philosophy of Jeet Kune Do, created by none other than Bruce Lee. He works out five days a week.

== Film and television ==
Year	Title	Role	Notes
2010	Eat Pray Love	Voiceover Actor	
2009	Castle (TV series)	The Bank Manager	
2009	Leverage	Avi/Donnie	
2009	La Linea	Omar	
2008	Numb3rs	Cutty Nagim	
2008	Zoey 101	Roger at tech support	
2007	24	The Middle Eastern Man	
2006	Thanksgiving USA	Peter Nazar	
2006	Days of Our Lives	Dr. Myers	
2006	Special Ops: Delta Force	Ibrahim Shaalan	
2005	Untold Stories of the ER	Resident Amer	
2005	Naked In Ashes	Lead Narrator	
2005	Showbiz India Xtreme	Himself	
2005	The Michael Jackson Trial	Martin Bashir	
2005	India Spiceland	Maneesh	
2003	Far From India	Talvin	
1999	Khwahish (TV series)	Ronaldo	

== Selected stage works ==
Year	Title	Role	Notes
2010–2011	Legally Blonde (musical) 2nd U.S./Canada National Tour	Professor Callahan	
2008	Money Shot	The C**t	
2007	The Conex	Mahmoud Bashir	
2006	I Gelosi	Vincenzo, Duke of Mantua	
2005	Vivekananda: The Lion Between Matter and Spirit	Swami Vivekananda	
2004	The Road to Damascus	Faruq Abdullah	
2002	Tecumseh!	Blue Jacket, Wasegoboah	
2001	Tecumseh!	Blue Jacket	
2001	A Midsummer Night's Dream	Theseus, Duke of Athens	
