= KFQX (disambiguation) =

Several radio stations were formerly assigned the call sign KFQX, which are currently assigned to a television station (digital channel 15, virtual channel 4) in Grand Junction, Colorado:

- KYYW, a radio station (1470 AM) licensed to Abilene, Texas, which held the call sign KFQX from 1984 to 1989
- KHXS, a radio station (102.7 FM) licensed to Merkel, Texas, which held the call sign KFQX-FM from 1985 to 1992 and 1997 to 1998
- KTJK, a radio station (106.3 FM) licensed to Abilene, Texas, which held the call sign KFQX-FM from 1998 to 1999
- KTLT, a radio station (98.1 FM) licensed to Anson, Texas, which held the call sign KFQX-FM from 1999 to 2004
