= Beyoncé videography =

Videos and media by American singer

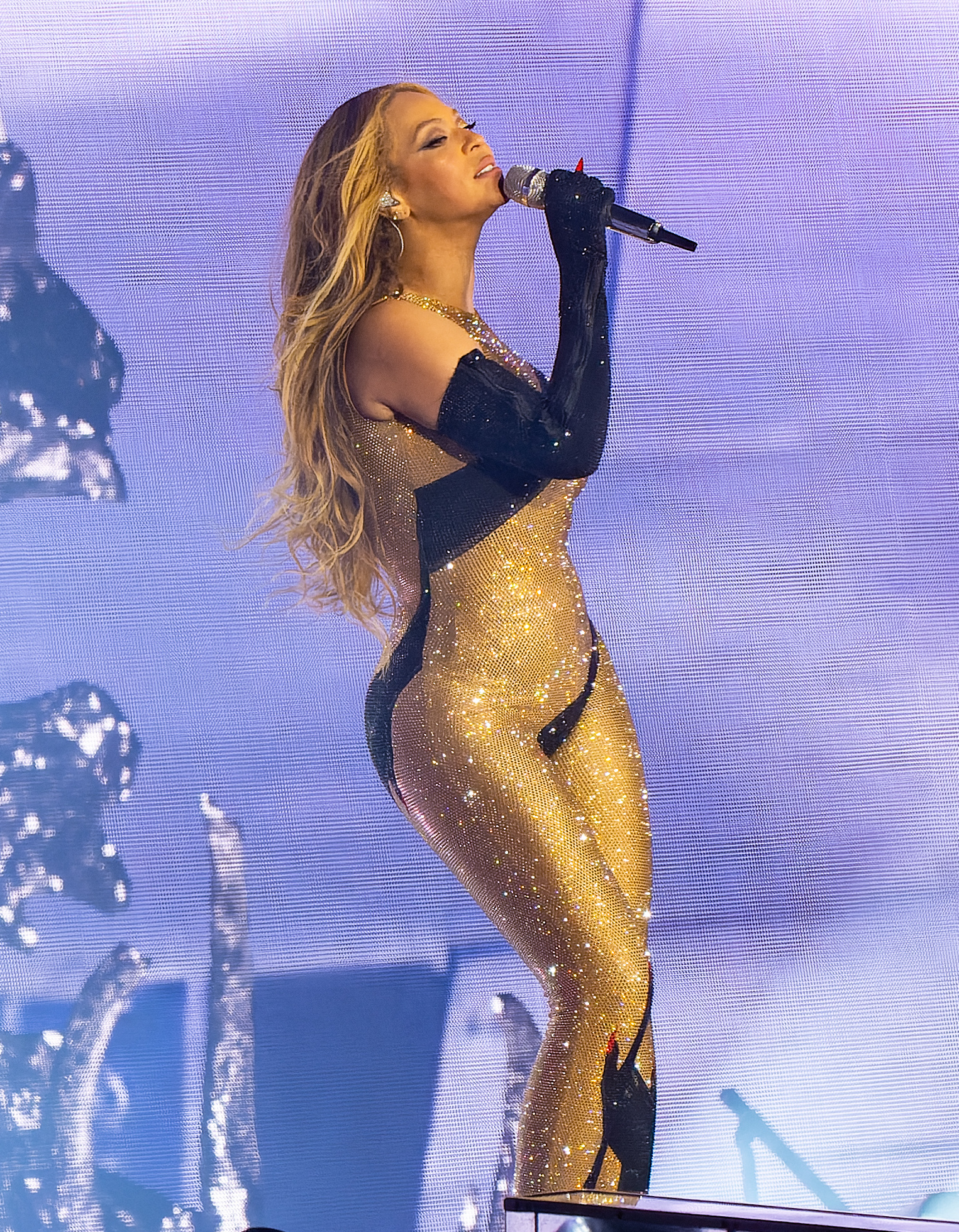
Beyoncé at the Renaissance World Tour in 2023. Performances from this tour were filmed for the self-directed theatrical release Renaissance: A Film by Beyoncé (2023).

American singer-songwriter Beyoncé has appeared in numerous music videos, documentaries and films. She has also directed eight full-length films, including five concert films and two musical films. Her films have grossed over $3.2 billion worldwide at the box office. She first appeared in the 1997 music video for Destiny's Child's "No, No, No", after which she made her film debut as the lead in the direct-to-video musical Carmen: A Hip Hopera (2001). Beyoncé's first solo music video was the soundtrack single "Work It Out" for Austin Powers in Goldmember (2002), which also featured her debut theatrical film role. She released her first music video as a solo artist for "Crazy in Love" from Dangerously in Love (2003).

In 2006, Beyoncé starred in two films: The Pink Panther, which spawned the single "Check on It" and its pink-themed video, and the musical drama Dreamgirls, which earned her a Golden Globe Award for Best Actress nomination. Her second solo album B'Day (2006) was her first "visual album" project — music videos for thirteen of the album's songs were released via the B'Day Anthology Video Album. Music videos were also released for singles from I Am... Sasha Fierce (2008); the black-and-white video for "Single Ladies (Put a Ring on It)" inspired a dance craze. Beyoncé ended the decade with the lead role in the thriller film Obsessed (2009).

The release of 4 (2011) was preceded by the music videos for its singles "Run the World (Girls)" and "Best Thing I Never Had". In 2013, Beyoncé voiced the role of Queen Tara in the animated film Epic, and surprise released her self-titled fifth studio album, which included accompanying music videos for every song. Since then, Beyoncé has directed two musical films: Lemonade (2016) and Black Is King (2020), which are visual accompaniments of the Lemonade (2016) and The Lion King: The Gift (2019) albums respectively. She also voiced the role of Nala in The Lion King (2019), which has grossed $1.6 billion to date.

Beyoncé has also directed five of her concert films — I Am... World Tour (2010), Live at Roseland (2011), Live in Atlantic City (2013), Homecoming: A Film by Beyoncé (2019), and Renaissance: A Film by Beyoncé (2023). As of 2024, she has the most nominations for Grammy Award for Best Music Film, at five; Homecoming won the award in 2020. Additionally, On The Run Tour (2014), Lemonade, Homecoming, and Black Is King have each received Primetime Emmy Award nominations; Black Is King won the Outstanding Costumes for a Variety, Nonfiction, or Reality Program award at the 73rd Primetime Emmy Awards

== List of music videos ==
Key
•	Denotes music videos directed or co-directed by Beyoncé

=== 1999 and 2000s ===
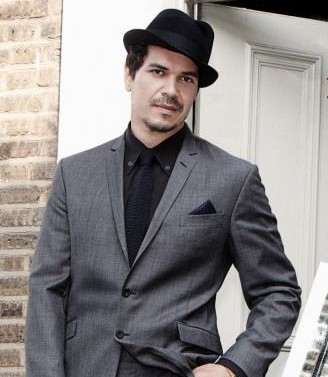
Ten of Beyoncé's videos have been directed by Jake Nava.

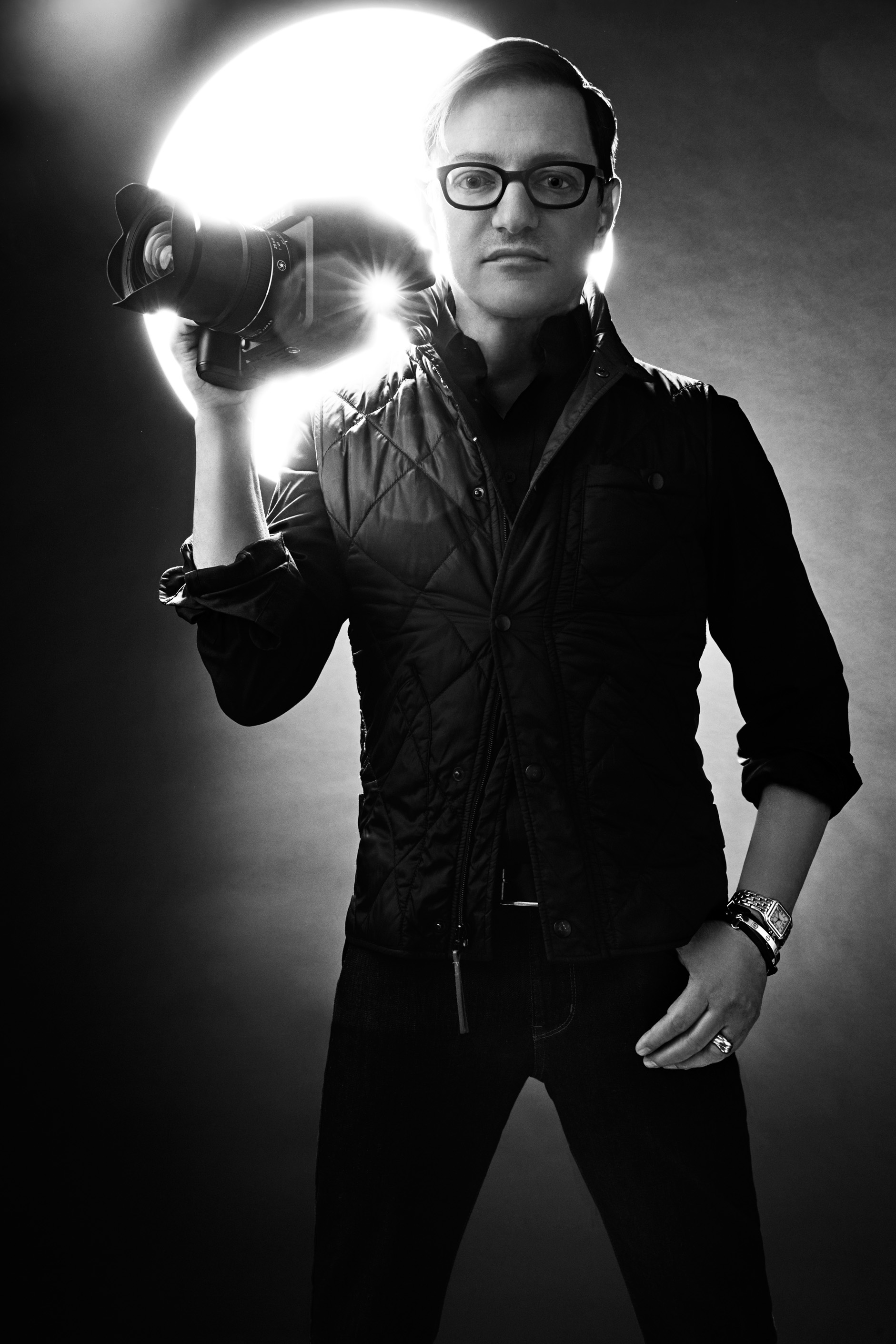
Matthew Rolston directed two of Beyoncé's music videos.

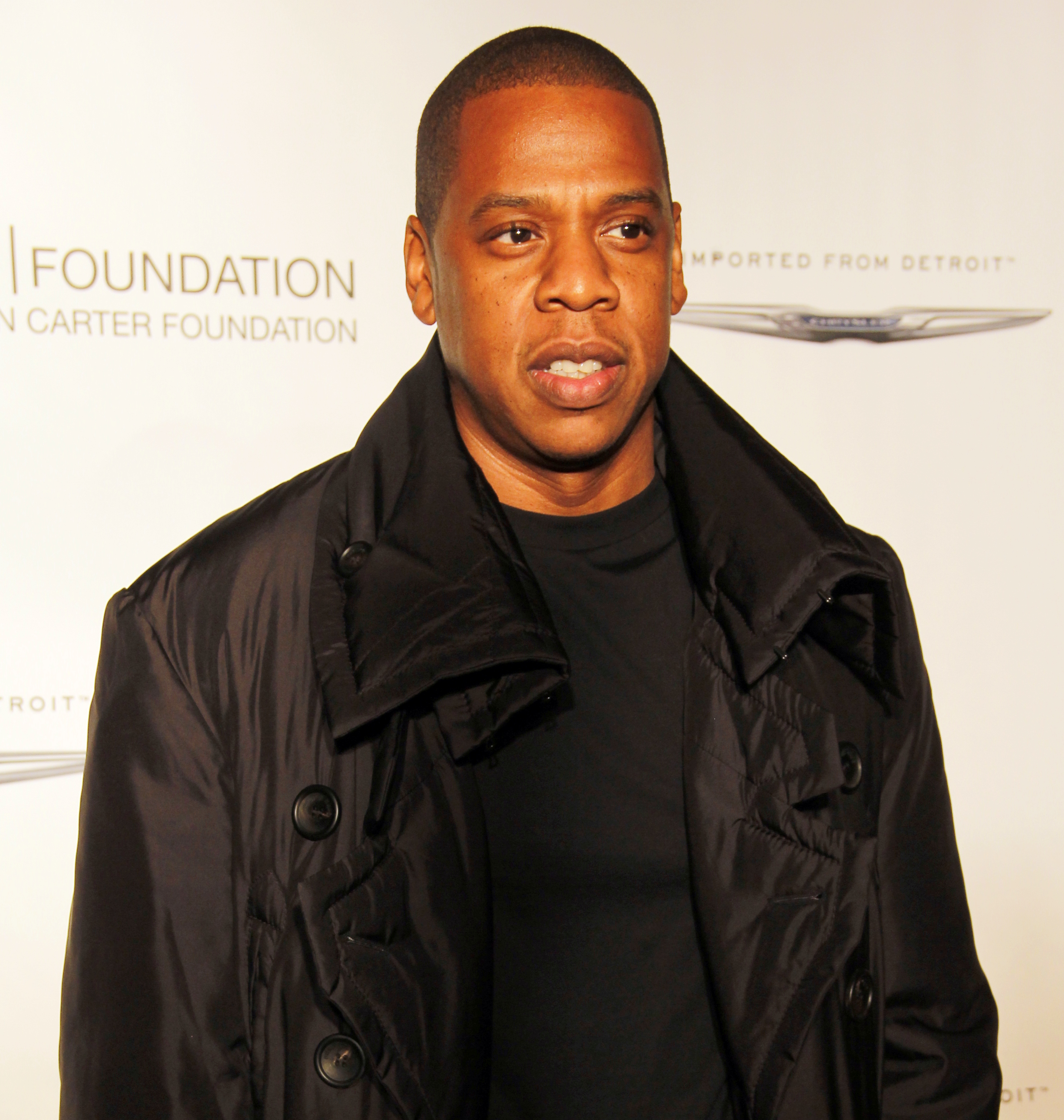
Beyoncé's husband Jay-Z has collaborated on several music videos.

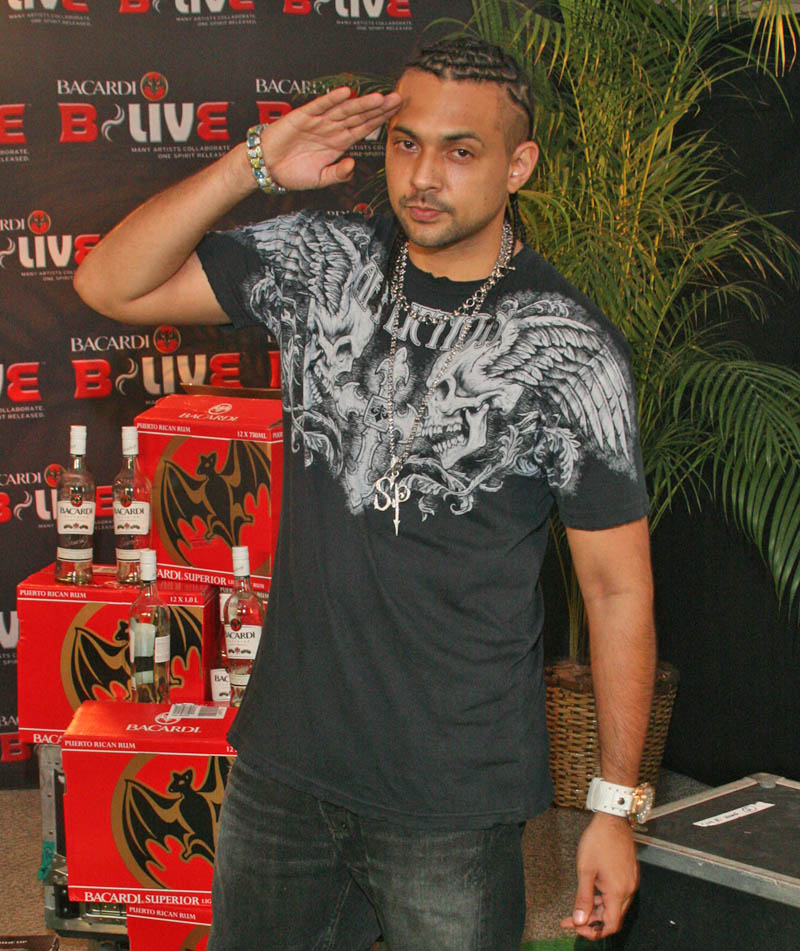
Sean Paul is seen in the video for "Baby Boy".

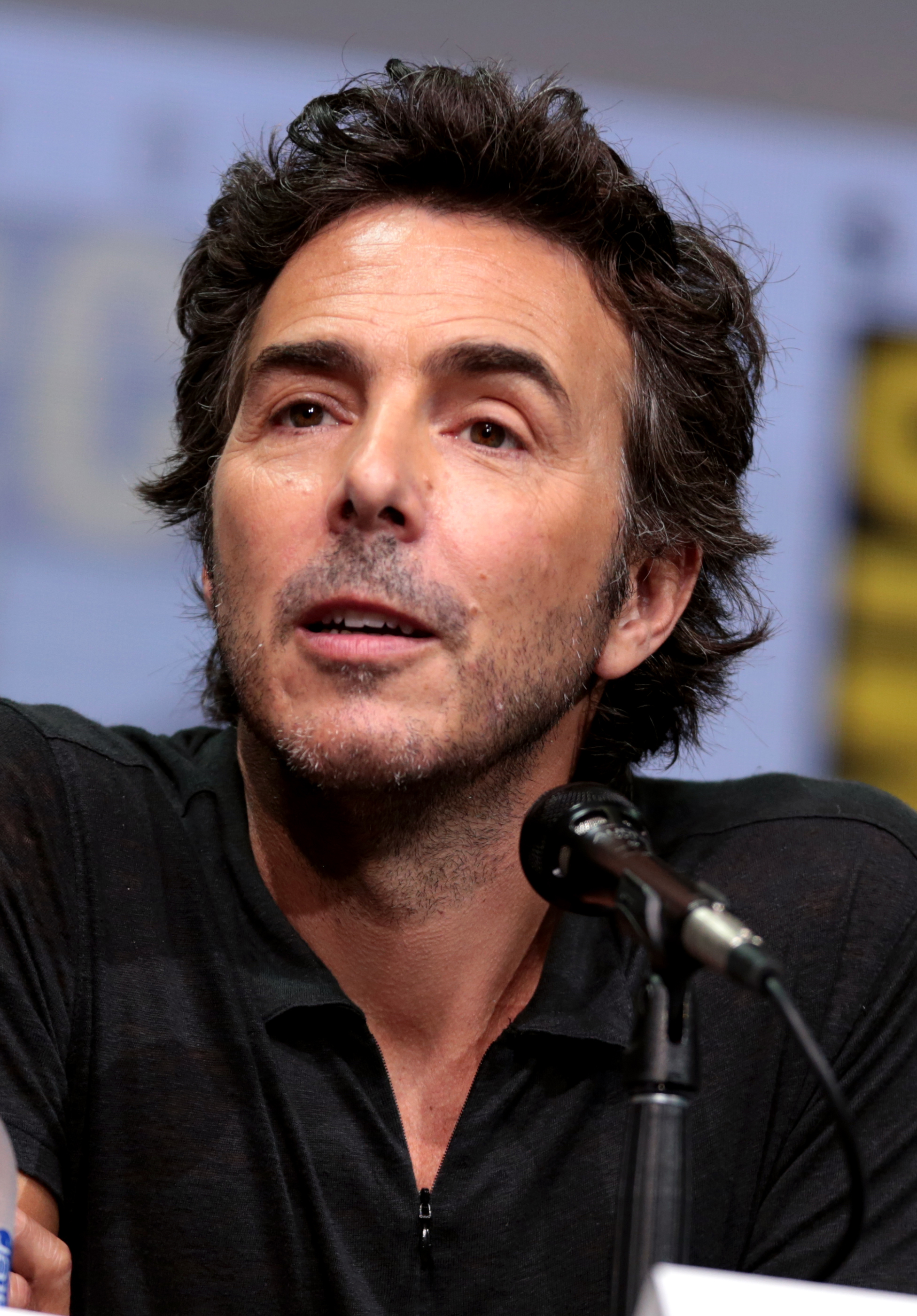
Shawn Levy directed the video for "A Woman Like Me".

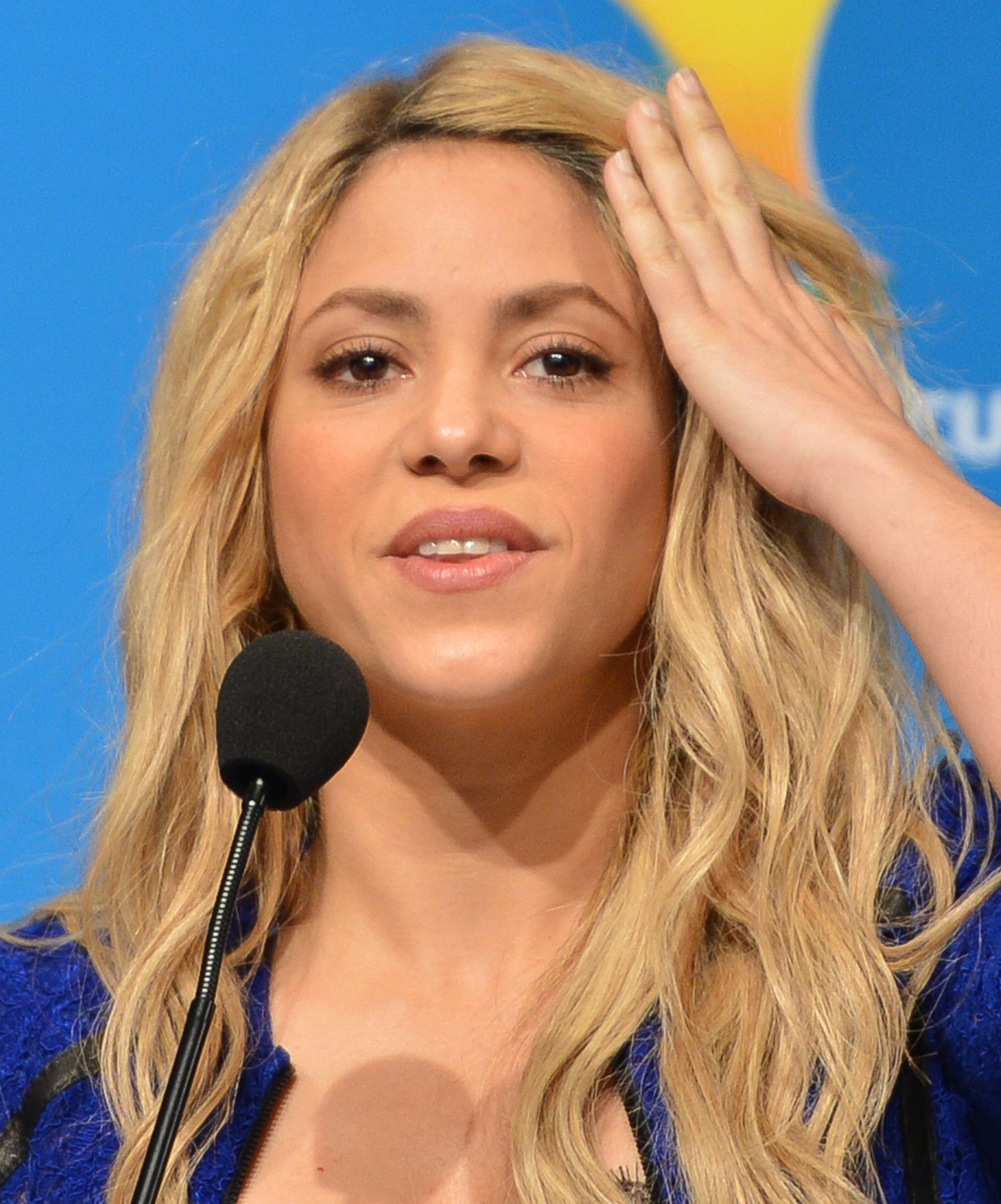
Shakira features in "Beautiful Liar".

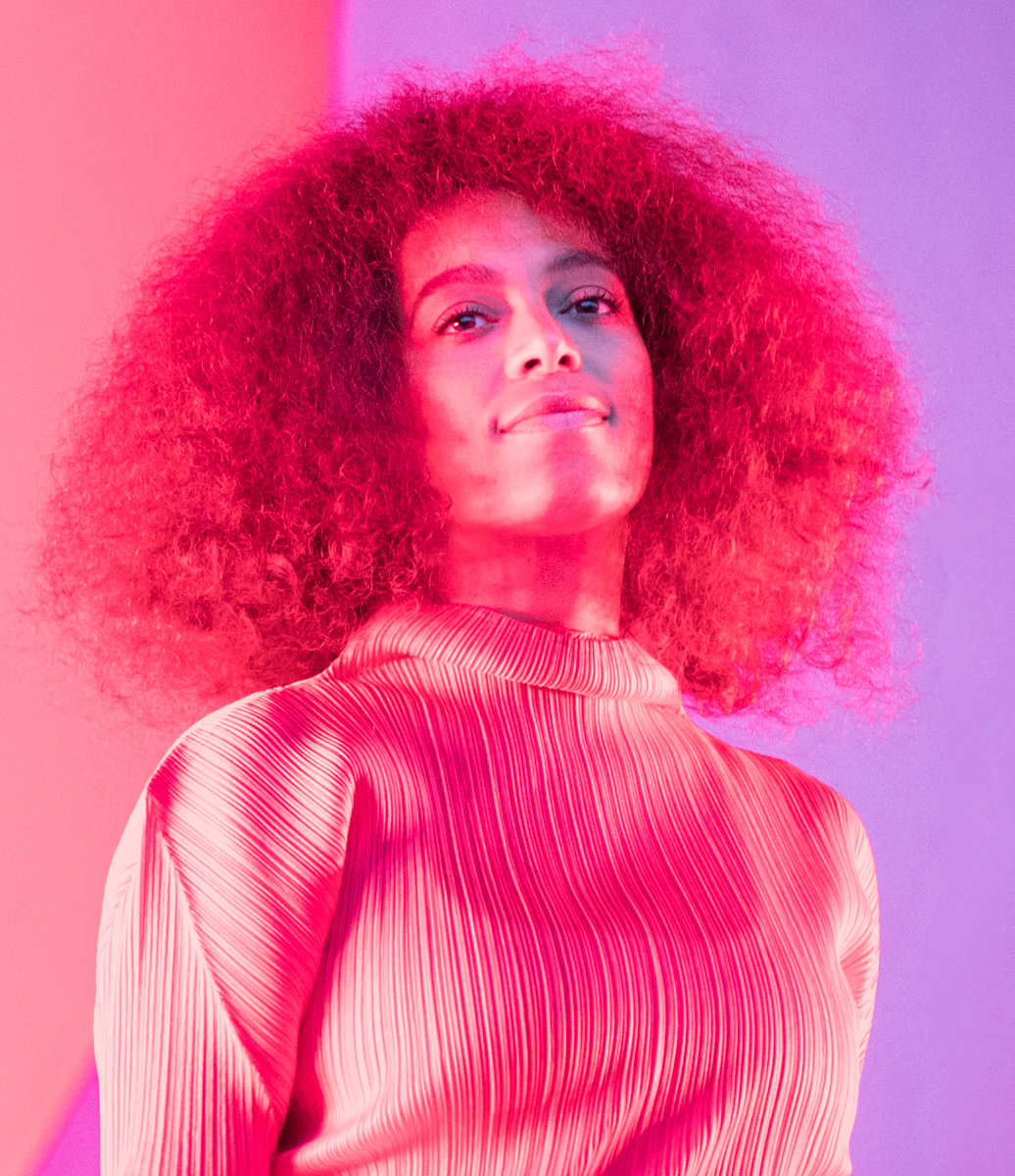
Beyoncé's sister Solange features in "Get Me Bodied".

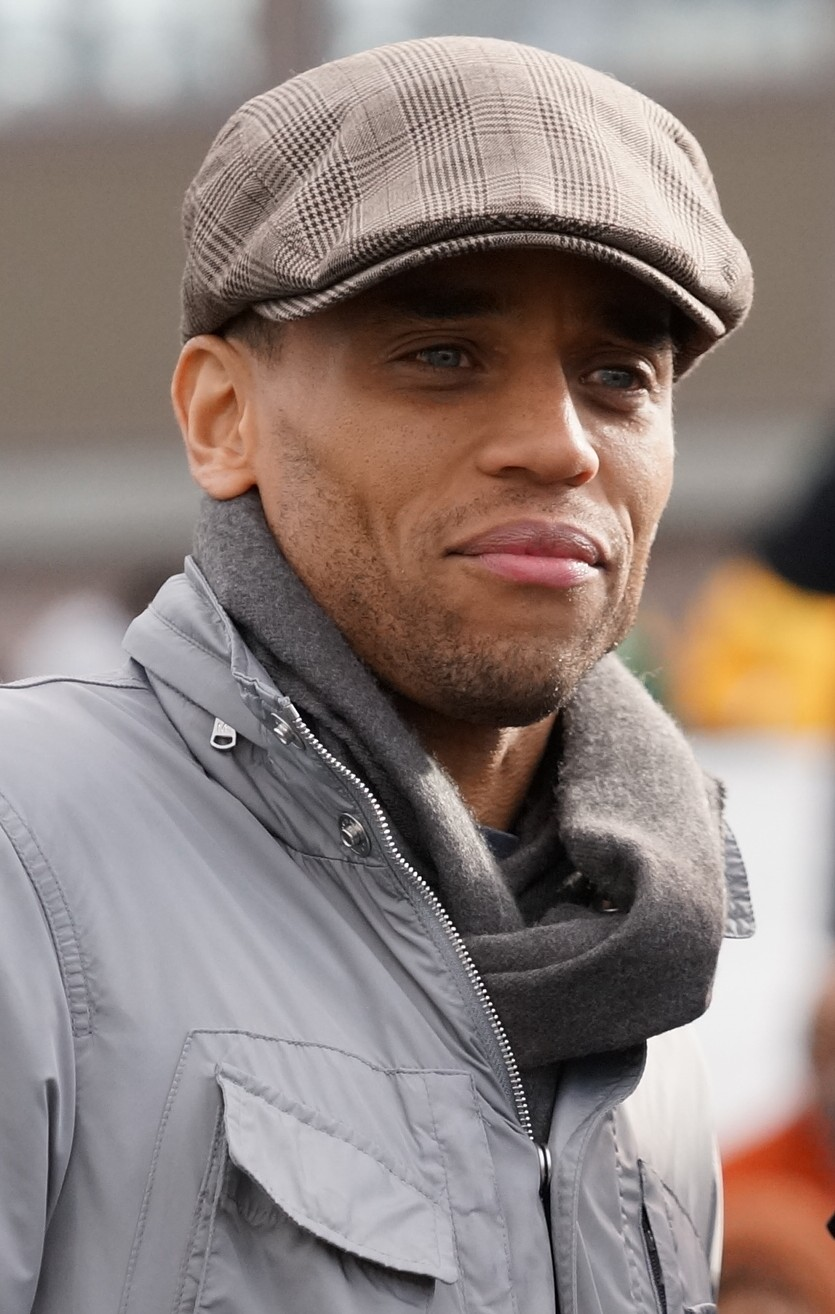
Michael Ealy plays Beyoncé's love interest in "Halo".

Title	Year	Other performer(s) credited	Director(s)	Description	Ref(s)
"Happily Ever After"	1999	Case	Little X	Beyoncé features as Case's love interest in the music video.	
"I Got That"	2000	Amil	Darren Grant; Jay-Z	Begins with Beyoncé and a director discussing someone they are filming. The rest of the video focuses on Amil and Beyoncé in a car, shopping as female rapper Eve briefly appears in the video.	
"Work It Out"	2002	None	Matthew Rolston	First solo soundtrack music video that is 1970s disco inspired. Contains clip of Austin Powers in Goldmember.	
"'03 Bonnie & Clyde"	2002	Jay-Z	Chris Robinson	Beyoncé and Jay-Z play modern day-version of the 1920s bank robbers Bonnie and Clyde, escaping from the law. Influenced by True Romance.	
"Crazy in Love"	2003	Jay-Z	Jake Nava	Various dance sequences and blowing up a car. According to Beyoncé, the video "celebrates the evolution of a woman".	
"Fighting Temptation"	2003	Missy Elliott; MC Lyte; Free	Antti Jokinen	Shot in an abandoned mansion nearby Los Angeles, the video features Beyoncé, Missy Elliott, MC Lyte and Free among clips from The Fighting Temptations movie.	
"He Still Loves Me"	2003	Walter Williams Sr.	Jonathan Lynn	The eponymous choir group from The Fighting Temptations film, led by Beyoncé's character Lilly, perform the song in a theater stage in front of a large audience. Clips from various scenes from the movie are also shown.	
"Baby Boy"	2003	Sean Paul	Jake Nava	Dance sequences at a beach and in a house with English and Japanese-style rooms.	
"Me, Myself and I" (Note: An alternative version of "Me, Myself and I" leaked onto the internet on May 29, 2010. Unlike the original video this version does not go in reverse and includes a couple wardrobe changes and added scenes.)	2003	None	Johan Renck	Aftermath of a break-up played in reverse.	
"Naughty Girl"	2004	None	Jake Nava	Dancing flirtatiously with Usher in a retro-looking club.	
"Check on It"	2005	Bun B Slim Thug	Hype Williams	Dance sequences in pink outfits and backgrounds, reflecting The Pink Panther. Contains 1950s influences.	
"A Woman Like Me"	2006	None	Shawn Levy	Beyoncé, as Xania, performs the song on a small stage with two back-up dancers. Officially released on The Pink Panther film DVD.	
"Déjà Vu"	2006	Jay-Z	Sophie Muller	Dance sequences in high-end clothing. A scene was deemed to have "unacceptable interactions" between Beyoncé and Jay-Z, interpreted by some as fellatio.	
"Ring the Alarm" +(Fans Only version)	2006	None	Sophie Muller	Beyoncé being dragged into an interrogation room. Pays tribute to Basic Instinct.	
"Irreplaceable" + "Irreemplazable" (2007)	2006	None	Anthony Mandler	Beyoncé kicking out her cheating boyfriend (played by model Bobby Roache) out of her mansion.	
"Listen" (Performance version) +(Director's cut)	2006	None	Diane Martel	Modern-day stage scenes intercut with footage from Dreamgirls.	
"Listen" (Vogue Shoot version) +(Director's cut)	2006	None	Matthew Rolston	Beyoncé performs the song against a blank background among interspersed scenes from a photo shoot within her film Dreamgirls.	
"Beautiful Liar"	2007	Shakira	Jake Nava	The two singers dance in front of contrasting backgrounds, before belly-dancing and giving a look-alike effect.	
"Upgrade U"	2007	Jay-Z	Melina Matsoukas	Referencing designer brands. In some scenes, Beyoncé impersonates Jay-Z.	
"Kitty Kat"	2007	None	Melina Matsoukas	Beyoncé, dressed as a feline, plays with and rides a gigantic cat.	
"Green Light"	2007	None	Melina Matsoukas	Beyoncé and her backing band, Suga Mama, dancing using musical instruments as props. Influenced by Robert Palmer's "Addicted to Love" music video.	
"Flaws and All"	2007	None	Beyoncé; Cliff Watts	"Silly and goofy" black-and-white video revealing a personal side of Beyoncé.	
"Get Me Bodied" +(Timbaland Mix featuring Julio Voltio)	2007	None	Anthony Mandler	Instructional dance-oriented video featuring cameo appearances by Destiny's Child bandmates Kelly Rowland and Michelle Williams and sister Solange Knowles. Displays 1960s influences and pays tribute to Sweet Charity.	
"Freakum Dress"	2007	None	Ray Kay	Beyoncé and various women "of different ethnicities, sizes, shapes, ages" dance in instantly-changing colorful metallic dresses.	
"Suga Mama"	2007	None	Melina Matsoukas	Beyoncé portrays a man and transitions to womanhood. Features pole dancing and mechanical bull riding.	
"Still in Love (Kissing You)"	2007	None	Beyoncé; Cliff Watts	Black and white simulation of a found home video of Beyoncé in a simple bathing suit lying on the beach under the sun singing some of the song's lyrics.	
"If I Were a Boy" + "Si Yo Fuera un Chico"	2008	None	Jake Nava	Gender role-reversal, outlining things that men do that hurt their girlfriends. Co-starring NFL player, Eddie Goines.	
"Single Ladies (Put a Ring on It)"	2008	None	Jake Nava	J-Setting choreography inspired by Bob Fosse's "Mexican Breakfast".	
"Diva"	2008	None	Melina Matsoukas	Dancing in a warehouse, before blowing up a car. Also includes snippet of "Video Phone".	
"Halo" (Note: An alternate video for "Halo" leaked onto the internet in May 2010. It shows Beyoncé driving down windy roads to find her love interest only to discover that he has been killed by police. This version of the video contains clips of the original but most are replaced with her love interest getting mauled by dogs and Beyoncé finding him dead and thinking back on kinder memories.)	2008	None	Philip Andelman	Light scenery, illustrating love between Beyoncé and her partner, played by Michael Ealy.	
"Ego" +(Remix featuring Kanye West) +(Fan exclusive version) (Note: Two alternate versions of the "Ego" video were released; a video for the song's remix with Kanye West shows scenes of the rapper in a room with a followspot, while the "fan-exclusive" cut features different camera angles.)	2009	None	Beyoncé; Frank Gatson	"Stripped down" choreography in front of a black brick wall and around a chair.	
"Broken-Hearted Girl"	2009	None	Sophie Muller	Reminiscing on a former romance on a beach.	
"Sweet Dreams"	2009	None	Adria Petty	Dance sequences in asymmetrical dresses and robot-style costumes.	
"Video Phone" (Extended remix)	2009	Lady Gaga	Hype Williams	Firing toy firearms and chair dancing. The video's opening is inspired by the film Reservoir Dogs.	

=== 2010s ===
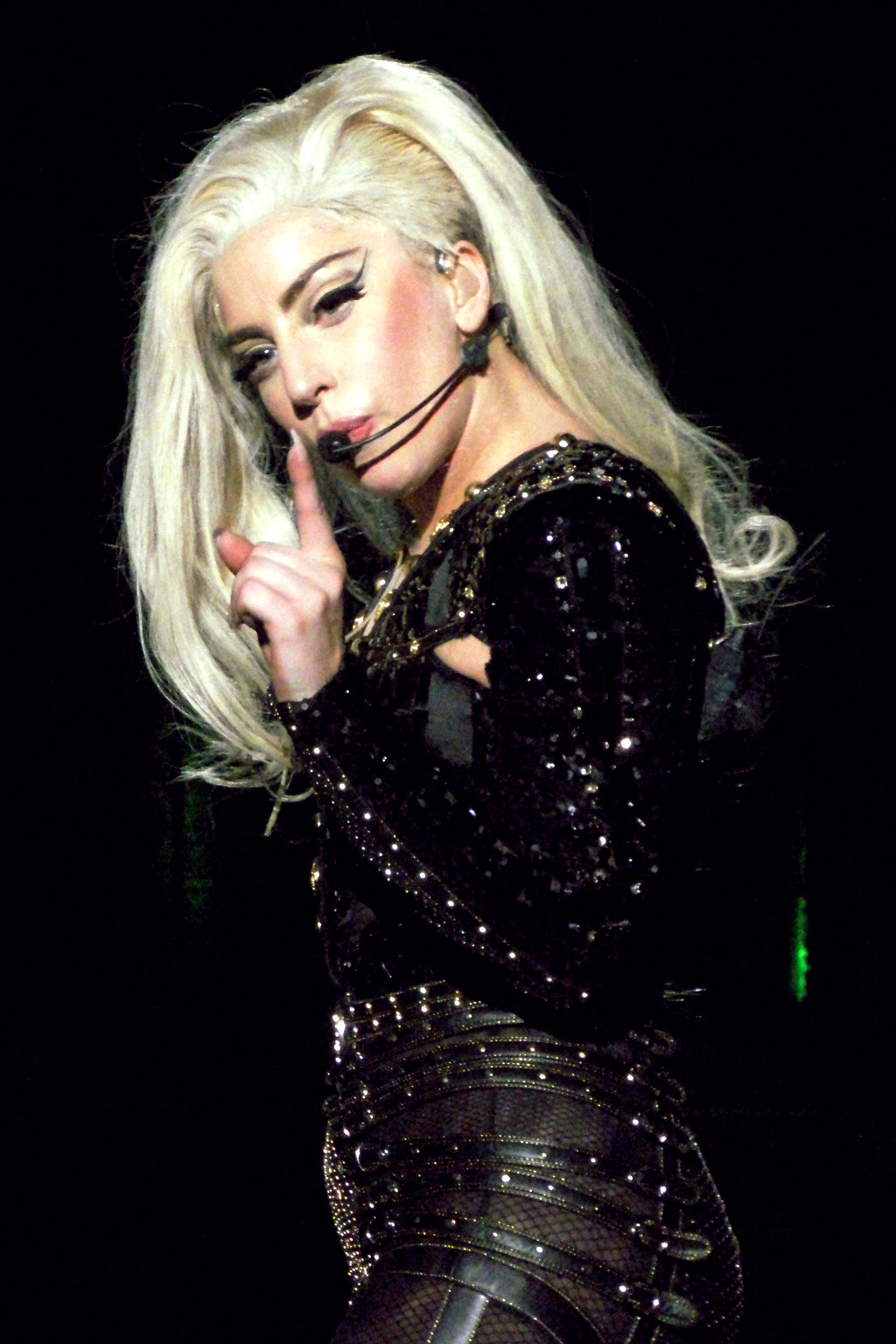
Lady Gaga and Beyoncé collaborated on "Video Phone" and "Telephone".

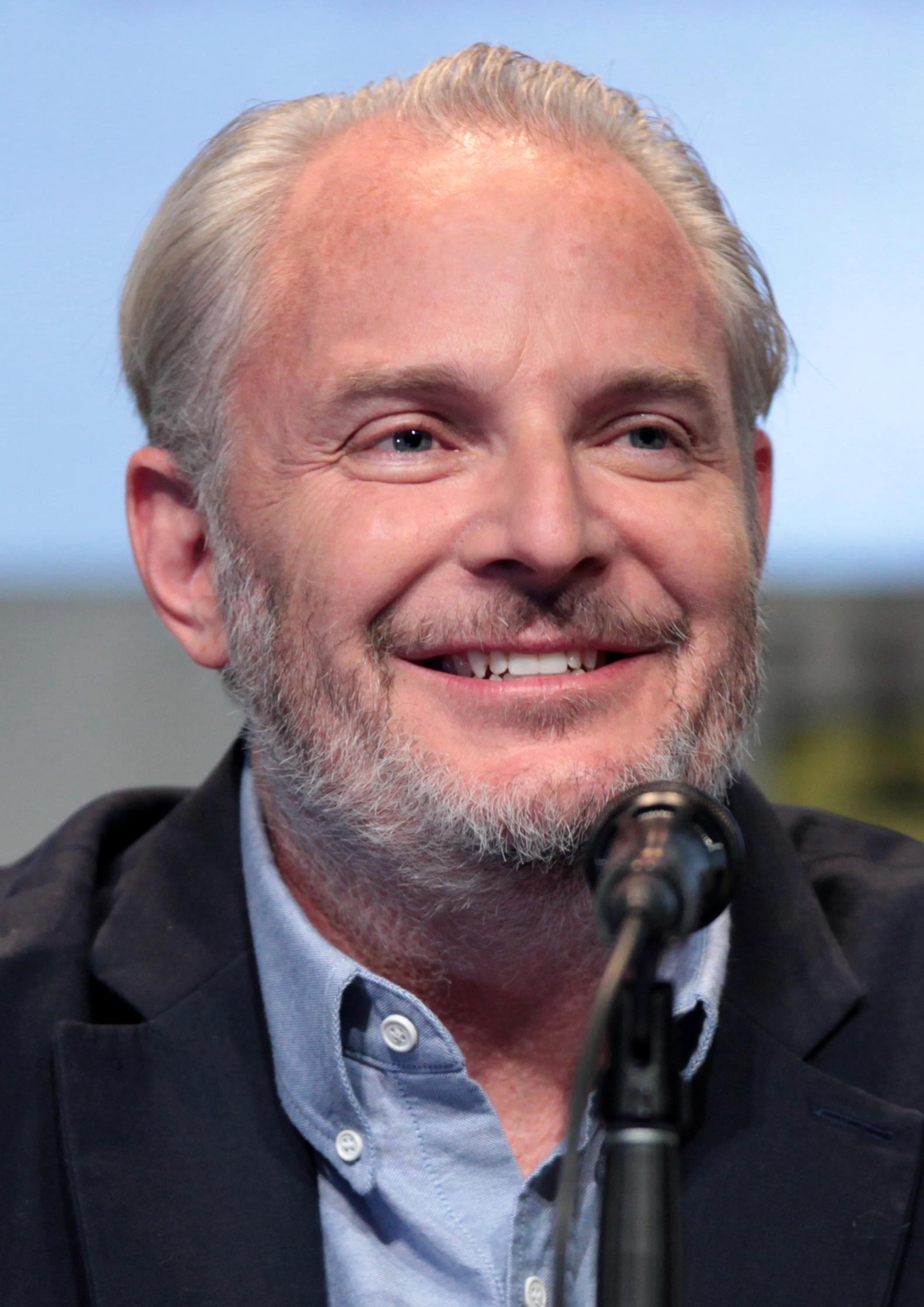
Francis Lawrence directed the music video for "Run the World (Girls)".

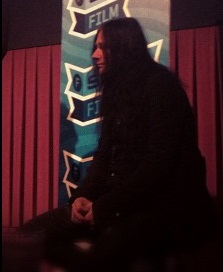
Jonas Åkerlund has directed four videos Beyoncé has featured in.

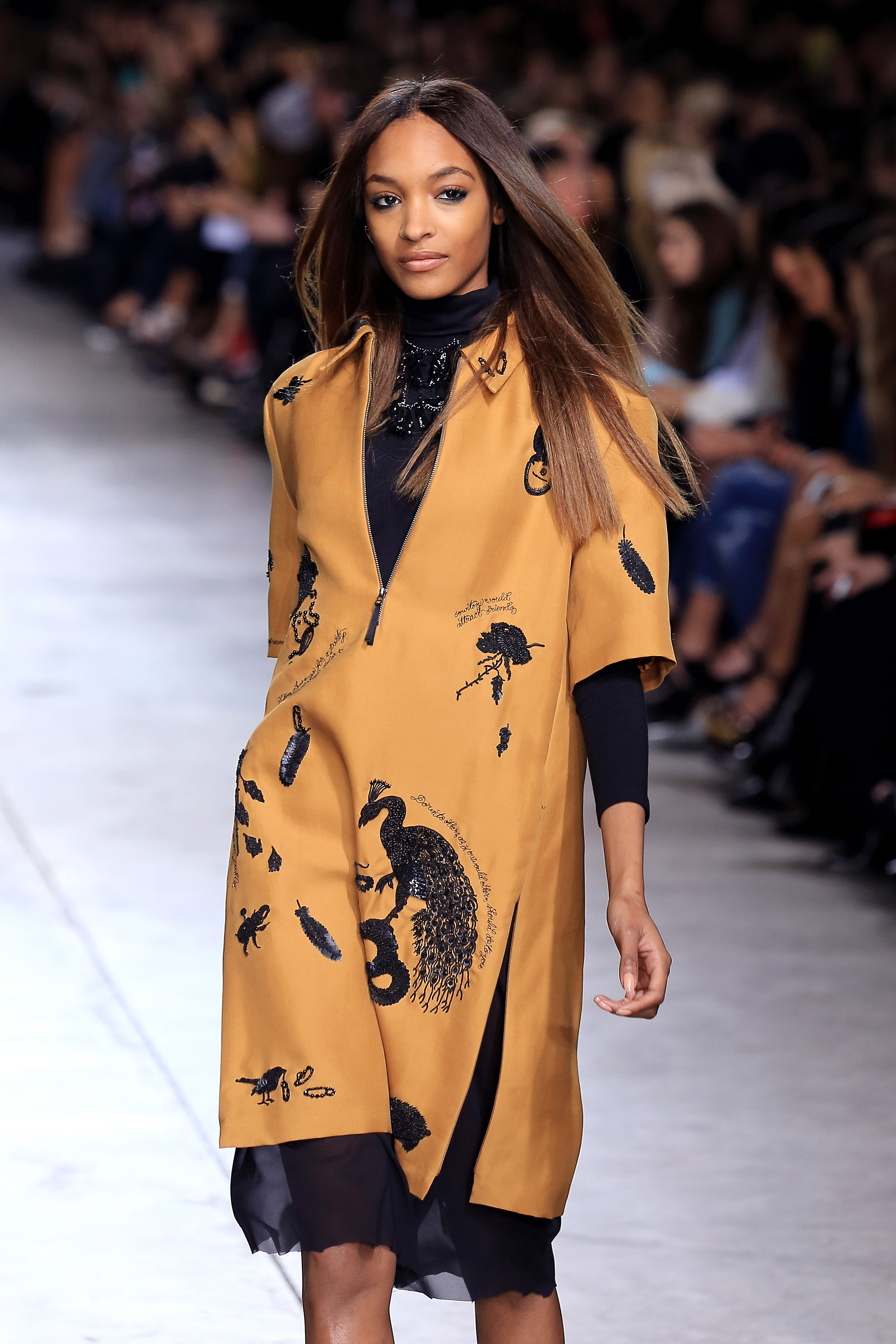
Jourdan Dunn plays one of the three models in "Yoncé".

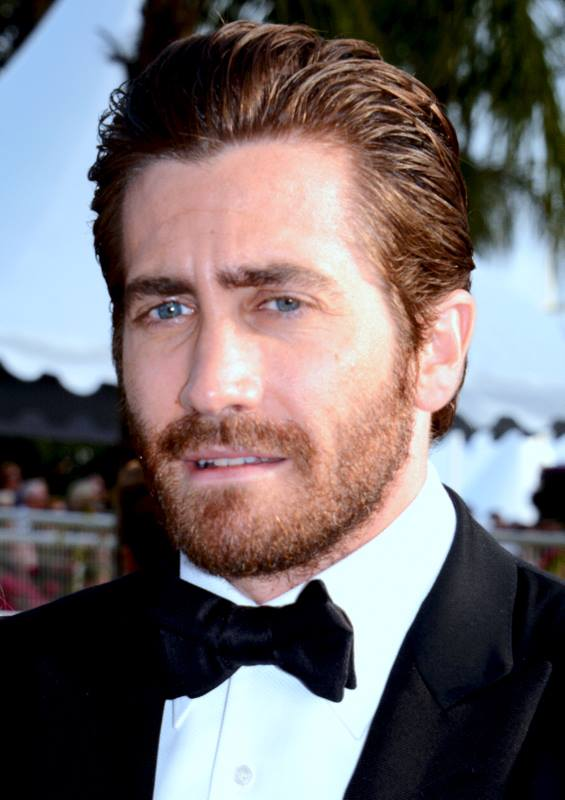
Jake Gyllenhaal, one of the multiple celebrities to make a cameo in "Run"

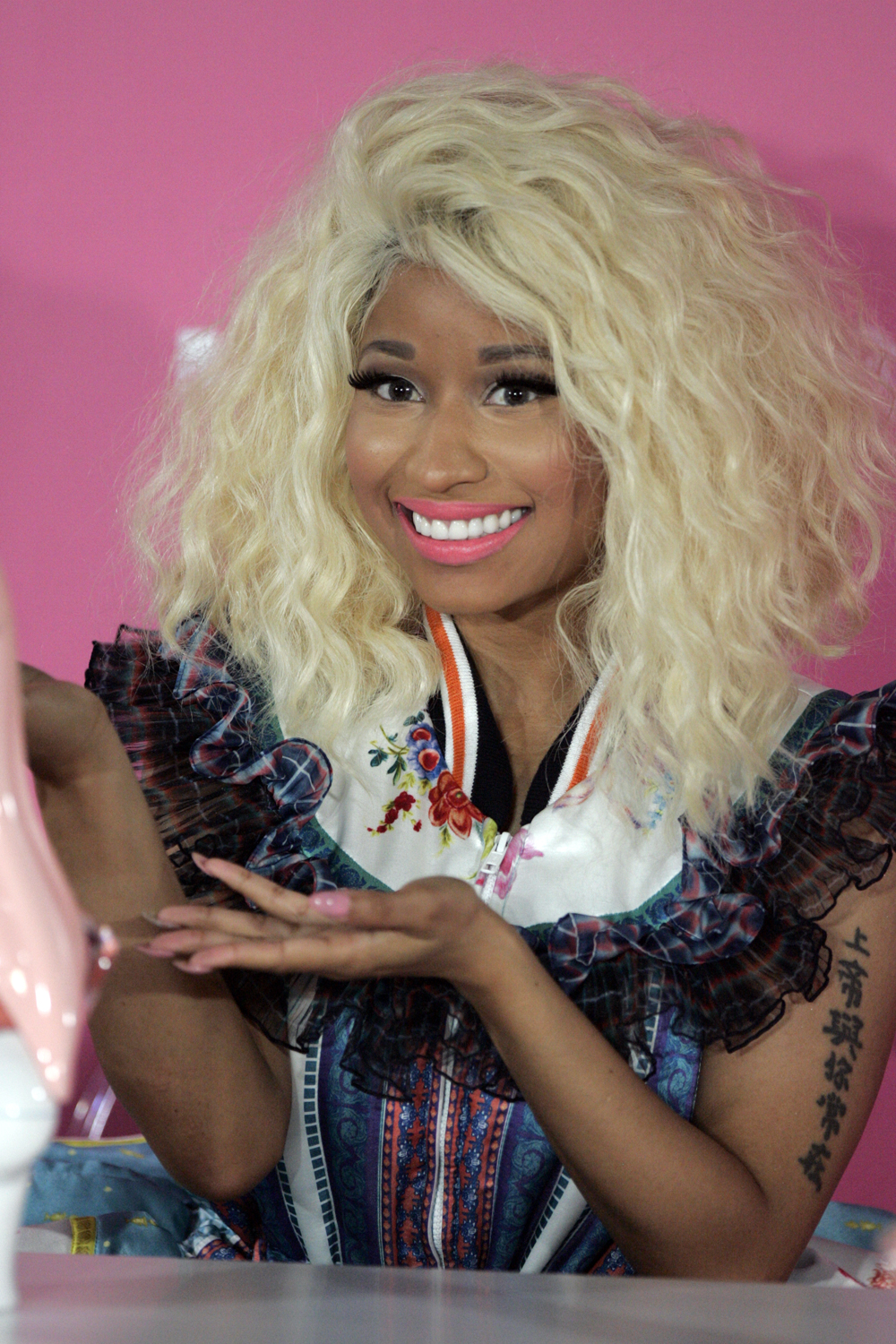
Nicki Minaj and Beyoncé have appeared in three videos together.

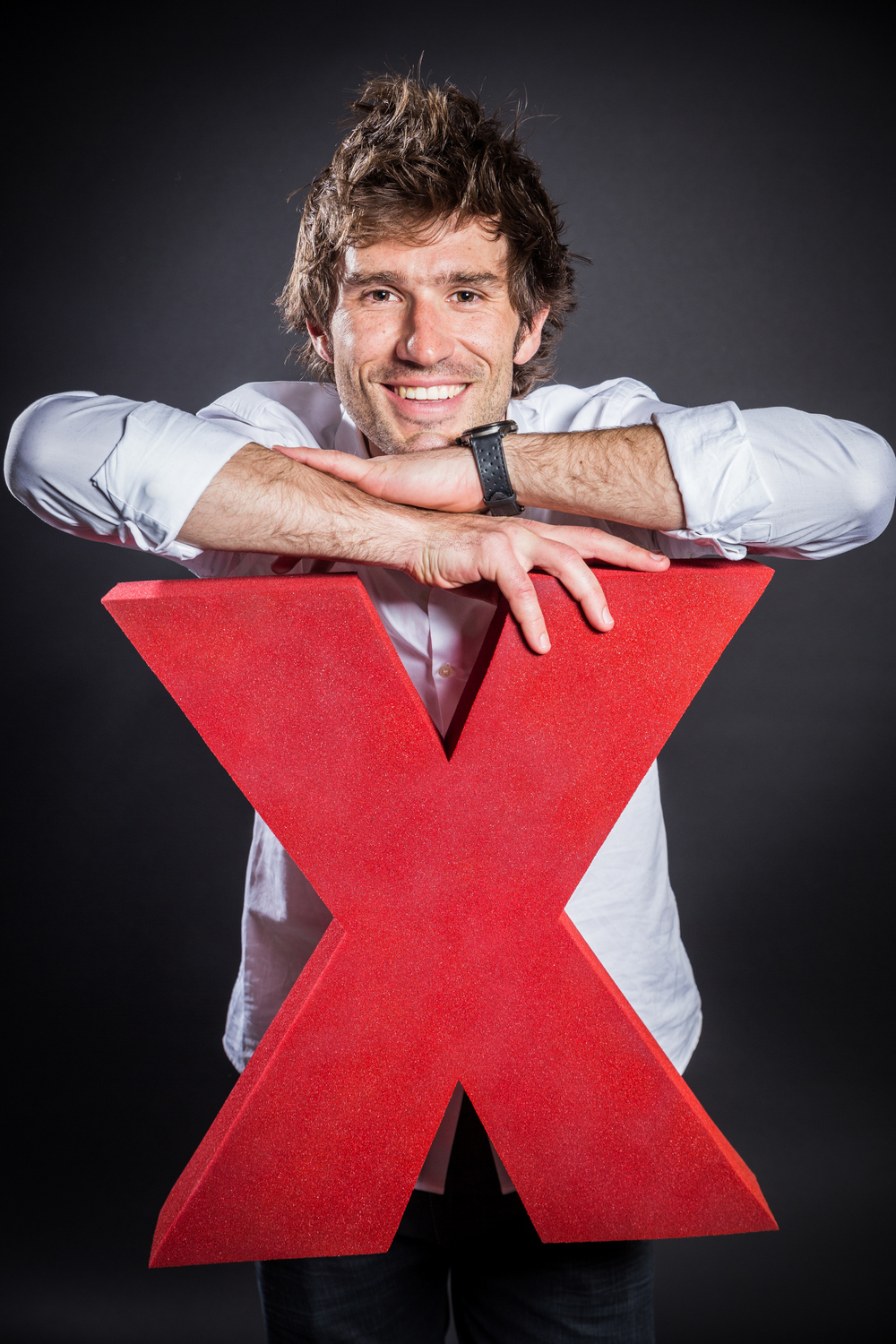
Free-diver Guillaume Nery appears in the video for "Runnin' (Lose It All)".

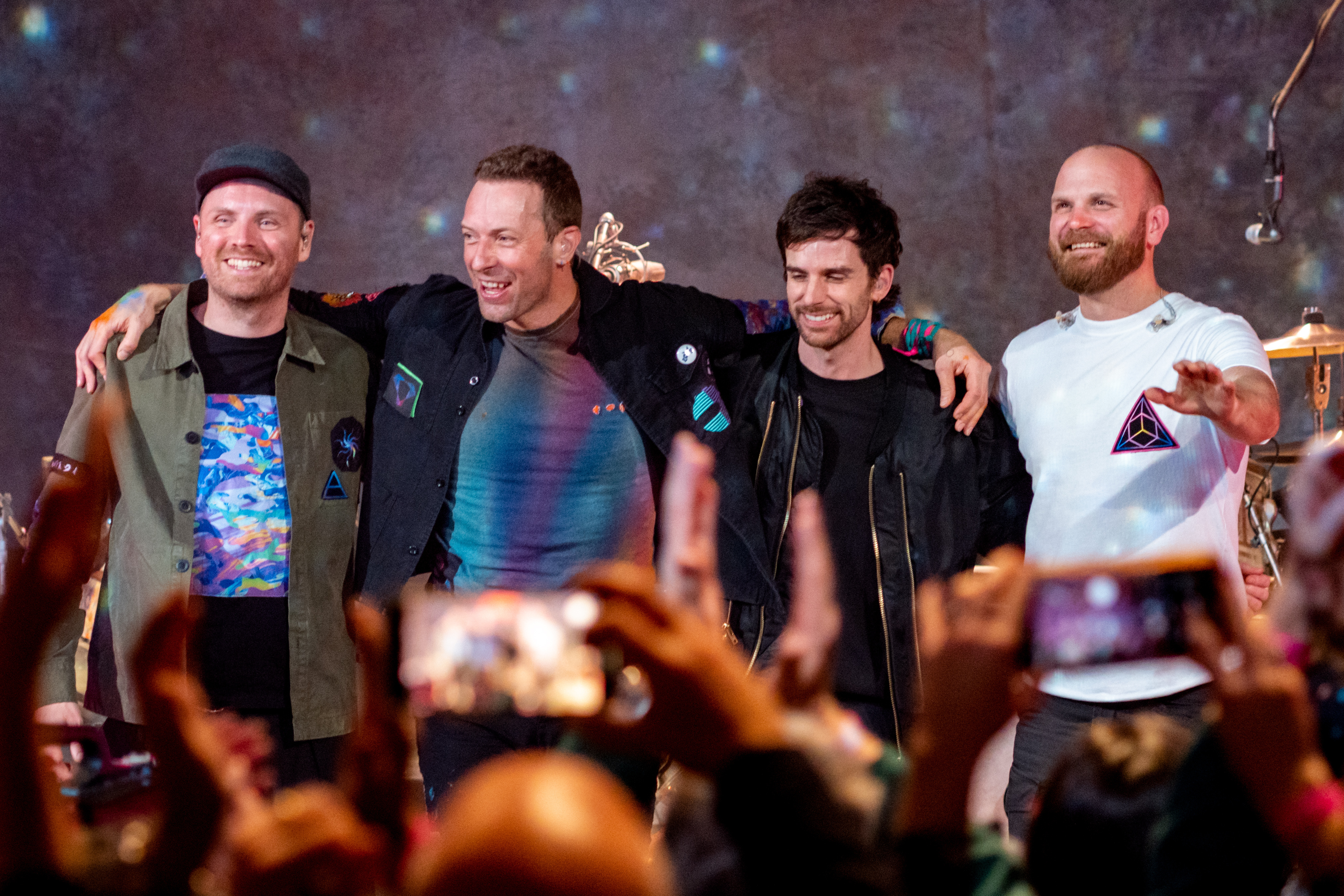
Beyoncé appeared in the music video for Coldplay's "Hymn for the Weekend" in January 2016.

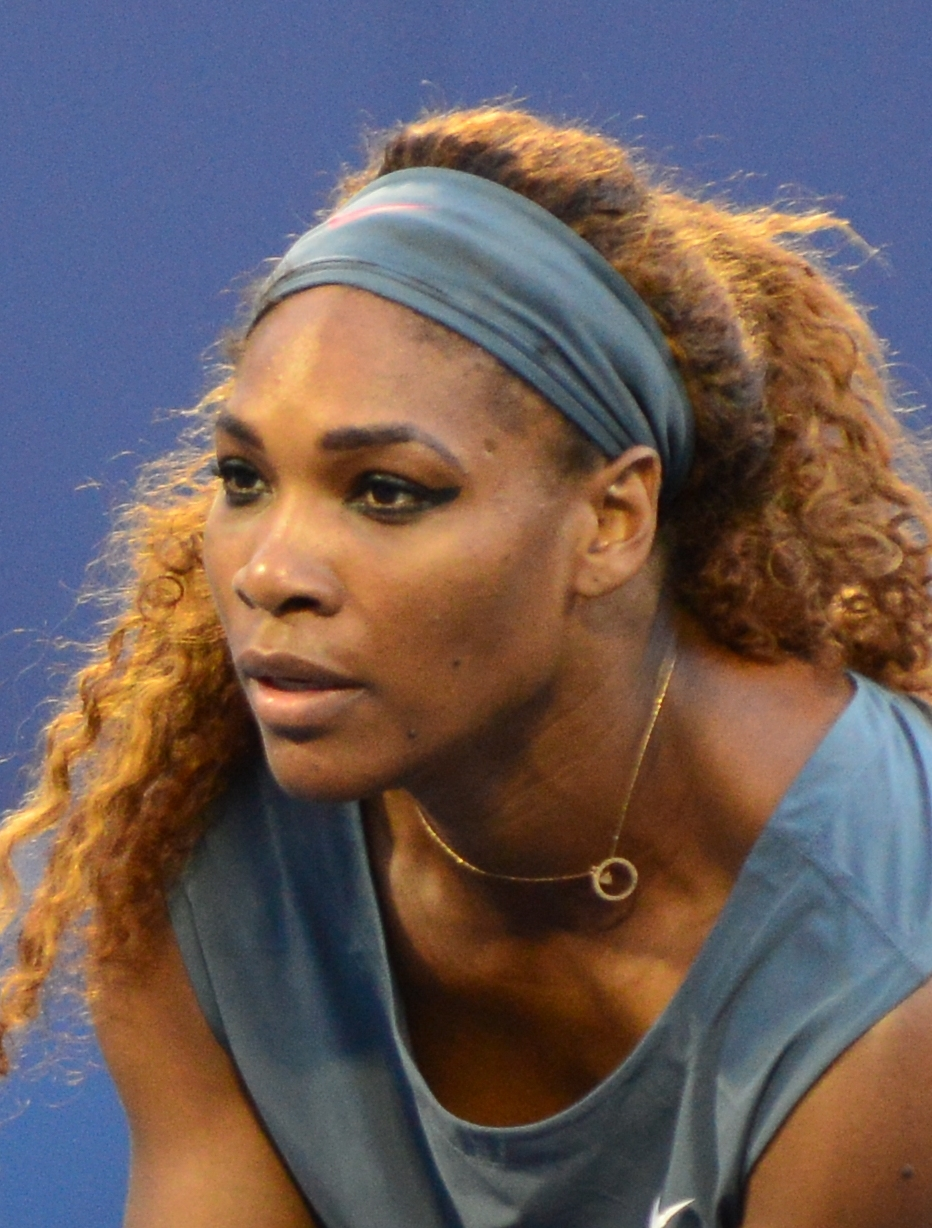
Tennis player Serena Williams makes a cameo appearance in "Sorry".

Title	Year	Other performer(s) credited	Director(s)	Description	Ref(s)
"Telephone" + Clean edit	2010	Lady Gaga	Jonas Åkerlund	Continuation of "Paparazzi". Beyoncé bails Gaga out of jail and murders her love interest, played by Tyrese Gibson. Pays homage to Kill Bill, Caged Heat and Pulp Fiction. Features cameo appearance by Semi Precious Weapons.	
"Put It in a Love Song" (Note: The music video was shot in February 2010. A teaser was leaked in March 2011 (more than a year later), but the video remains unreleased. According to Keys' publicist "Presently, there are no plans to release the video.")	2010	Alicia Keys	Melina Matsoukas	Unreleased, though known visuals show a Brazilian Carnival theme. Filmed in Rio de Janeiro.	
"Why Don't You Love Me" +(MK Ultras Mix)	2010	None	Beyoncé; Melina Matsoukas	In the 1950s-influenced video, Beyoncé, as "B.B. Homemaker", does household chores. Pays homage to Betty Draper.	
"Move Your Body"	2011	None	Melina Matsoukas	Students join Beyoncé to perform choreography by Frank Gatson. In the choreography, Beyoncé and the students "mix salsa, dancehall, and the running man." The music video for "Move Your Body" takes place as a four-minute long flash mob. The video begins during lunch hour at what looks like a junior high cafeteria	
"Run the World (Girls)"	2011	None	Francis Lawrence	Leading an army of 200 dancers in the heavily choreographed clip, Beyoncé begins a revolution for females. The video features usage of animals including lions and hyenas.	
"Best Thing I Never Had"	2011	None	Diane Martel	As Beyoncé prepares for her wedding, she recalls attending her high school prom with her high school sweetheart, who had left her. However, Beyoncé gets the last laugh as she walks down the aisle to marry a better man.	
"1+1"	2011	None	Beyoncé; Laurent Briet; Ed Burke	Unlike Beyoncé's past efforts which incorporated the heavy dance routines, the video experiments with psychedelic visual effects and lighting.	
"Countdown" + Alternate edit	2011	None	Beyoncé; Adria Petty	The video pays homage to different entertainment icons of the 1950s—1990s including Audrey Hepburn, Twiggy, Michael Jackson, Patricia Field, The Beatles, as well as films and musicals like Dreamgirls, Fame and Flashdance the Musical. Also borrows inspiration from choreographer Anne Teresa De Keersmaeker.	
"Love on Top"	2011	None	Beyoncé; Ed Burke	Wearing a black leotard, stockings, high-top sneakers, and a medal-adorned military cap, Beyoncé, together with her five male dancers, perform choreographed moves in a penthouse studio overlooking New York City.	
"Party"	2011	J. Cole	Beyoncé; Alan Ferguson	Beyoncé throws a backyard bash with her friends in the colorful, retro-themed video. Featured rapper J. Cole sweeps through in his blue Bugatti to join the old school festivities. Kelly Rowland and Solange make cameo appearances.	
"Dance for You"	2011	None	Beyoncé; Alan Ferguson	Beyoncé dances seductively on a table, on a master's chair and with her female dancers, to a mysterious detective in his office. The black and white video incorporates a film noir style, and has a 1940s-era feel.	
"I Was Here" +(Live at Roseland)	2012	None	Kenzo Digital; Sophie Muller	The video was filmed in front of a live audience at the United Nations General Assembly in New York. Beyoncé performs the song before a colossal screen that projects images of volunteers doing humanitarian work around the world.	
"Pretty Hurts"	2013	None	Melina Matsoukas	The video shows Beyoncé as a contestant competing in a beauty pageant trying to achieve physical perfection.	
"Ghost"	2013	None	Pierre Debusschere	The video opens with a close-up shot of Beyoncé's face lip-syncing the song's lyrics. Various shots of the singer in different flowing outfits and sets are featured. Other scenes show dancers with their whole bodies covered in white clothing simulating ghosts.	
"Haunted"	2013	None	Jonas Åkerlund	The video features Beyoncé walking in the corridor of a big mansion meeting various characters in different sexual get-ups inside the mansion's rooms. Critics compared the video of "Haunted" and the singer's look with works by Madonna.	
"Drunk in Love"	2013	Jay-Z	Hype Williams	The song's music video was shot in black-and-white in Golden Beach, Florida at a beach front manse. Beyoncé and Jay-Z frolic at the beach at night.	
"Blow"	2013	None	Hype Williams	The video was filmed at a roller skating rink in Houston, Texas and it features Beyoncé's sister Solange, her background dancers and her female band. The singer's style received comparisons to 1980's fashion and music videos in a similar way to the song itself.	
"No Angel"	2013	None	@lilinternet	The video was filmed in Houston, Texas, as a tribute to the singer's hometown. It features various landscape shots of the city and some of its famous places as well as close-up shots of many people, including ten Houston-based rappers.	
"Yoncé"	2013	None	Ricky Saiz	Throughout the clip, Beyoncé introduces viewers to her new alter ego Yoncé, whose preferences include Brooklyn, her grill, and "being the hottest girl in the club". The video also features fashion and video models Chanel Iman, Jourdan Dunn and Joan Smalls.	
"Partition"	2013	None	Jake Nava	The concept of the video was meant to illustrate the lyrics of the song. It depicts Beyoncé's sexual fantasies as a rich and bored housewife.	
"Jealous"	2013	None	Beyoncé; Francesco Carrozzini; Todd Tourso	The video for "Jealous" is considered to be a sequel to the previous clip on the album, "Partition".	
"Rocket"	2013	None	Beyoncé; Ed Burke; Bill Kirstein	The black-and-white video features various close-up shots of Beyoncé throughout; she is seen writhing on a bed dressed in lingerie, eating strawberries, having a shower inside a bathtub, playing on a piano, walking along a hotel corridor and lighting up a cigarette atop a car.	
"Mine"	2013	Drake	Pierre Debusschere	The video picks up on the theme of isolation and references two works of art: Michelangelo's sculpture Pietà (1498–1499) and René Magritte's painting The Lovers (1928). Beyoncé is shown wearing a veil and a gown with a mask of her own face on her hand, that she later puts on, simulating a statue's peaceful expression. Among other scenes the video shows a couple kissing with their heads enshrouded by white fabric. Drake also appears in the video.	
"XO"	2013	None	Terry Richardson	The music video was filmed on Coney Island's Cyclone roller coaster.	
"Flawless"	2013	Chimamanda Ngozi Adichie	Jake Nava	The video opens with original footage from Star Search, with young Beyoncé and other members of Girl's Tyme being announced by Ed McMahon. It transitions to other scenes shot in black-and-white, showing Beyoncé headbanging and moshing with members of a punk subculture, as well as dancing with a team of street dancers in a graffiti covered alley.	
"Superpower"	2013	Frank Ocean	Jonas Åkerlund	The video was filmed in a former shopping mall and presents a post-apocalyptic street war theme. The video features cameos by Kelly Rowland and Michelle Williams, as well as Pharrell Williams.	
"Heaven"	2013	None	Beyoncé; Todd Tourso	The video was shot in Puerto Rico and shows happy visuals of Beyoncé and a friend doing many amazing things together. The video implies the scenes of the girls together was actually Beyoncé's friend's bucket list, but she has actually passed away.	
"Blue"	2013	Blue Ivy Carter	Beyoncé; Ed Burke; Bill Kirstein	The video is an intimate and touching diary of two-year-old Blue Ivy vacationing with her parents in Rio de Janeiro.	
"Grown Woman"	2013	None	Jake Nava	The video shows old footage of the singer as a child and teen and then re-enacting the footage in the present day as an adult.	
"Run"	2014	Jay-Z	Melina Matsoukas	The music video was revealed to be a "faux-trailer" entitled "RUN", with "Part II (On the Run)" playing in the background. The video, which features multiple celebrity cameos including Don Cheadle, Guillermo Díaz, Jake Gyllenhaal, Kidada Jones, Rashida Jones, Blake Lively, Emmy Rossum and Sean Penn, shows Beyoncé and Jay-Z out on a Bonnie and Clyde expedition, filled with action, crime, love and guns.	
"Say Yes"	2014	Kelly Rowland; Michelle Williams	Matthew A. Cherry	The clip depicts the three singers at a street party, dancing and singing with a crowd, along with solo appearances of each singer in a forest, wearing white clothes.	
"7/11"	2014	None	Beyoncé	The clip was shot in the style of a home-made visual with the singer dancing at various locations: patio, balcony, hotel suite, a bathroom and in front of a Christmas tree.	
"Flawless (Remix)"	2014	Nicki Minaj	Jonas Åkerlund	Live performance video filmed during the concert in Paris, France of the On the Run Tour. Minaj joins Beyoncé onstage to perform the "Flawless (Remix)". Both singers perform dressed in clothes designed by Versace's Versus.	
"Feeling Myself"	2015	Nicki Minaj	Todd Tourso	Released exclusively on the streaming service Tidal, the video features Minaj and Beyoncé partying in a pool.	
"Bitch I'm Madonna"	2015	Madonna (featuring Nicki Minaj)	Jonas Åkerlund	Beyoncé is featured miming the lyric "Bitch, I'm Madonna" in the video.	
"Runnin' (Lose It All)"	2015	Naughty Boy; Arrow Benjamin	Charlie Robins	The video depicts a woman and a man chasing each other underwater, portrayed by freedivers Guillaume Néry and Alice Modolo.	
"Hymn for the Weekend"	2016	Coldplay	Ben Mor	The video was shot in October 2015 at various Indian cities including scenes in the Bassein Fort in Vasai, Mumbai. The video features Beyoncé in elaborate Indian attire in various settings. Indian actress Sonam Kapoor also makes an appearance.	
"Formation"	2016	None	Melina Matsoukas	Shot in New Orleans, Louisiana, the video features references to Hurricane Katrina, antebellum, and Louisiana Creole culture, besides dealing with police brutality and racism.	
"Sorry"	2016	None	Beyoncé; Kahlil Joseph	Filmed in black-and-white, the video features multiple cameo appearances by celebrities Serena Williams, Ibeyi, Amandla Stenberg, Quvenzhané Wallis, and Zendaya. Originally part of Beyoncé's Lemonade film that premiered on HBO, an official music video was uploaded to her YouTube channel in June 2016.	
"Hold Up"	2016	None	Jonas Åkerlund	Originally part of the Lemonade film, the video features Beyoncé destroying multiple cars and security cameras using a baseball bat. According to Mashable, Beyoncé also makes reference of Oshun, a Yoruba goddess.	
"All Night"	2017	None	Melina Matsoukas	Includes footage from Beyoncé's home movies, including her and Jay Z's wedding day and spending family time with their daughter.	
"Sandcastles"	2017	None	Mark Romanek	Also part of the film Lemonade, it features scenes of a tearful Beyoncé together with Jay Z who is seen embracing her, and laying together with her. Gerrick D. Kennedy from Los Angeles Times describes it as "the most intimate of displays for pop's most intensely private couple".	
"Love Drought"	2017	None	Kahlil Joseph	A troubled Beyoncé lies down in the middle of an empty football stadium. The singer leads a group of black women walking through water while the sun is setting.	
"Family Feud"	2017	Jay-Z	Ava DuVernay	The video features multiple cameo appearances by actors Trevante Rhodes, Michael B. Jordan, Thandie Newton, Jessica Chastain, America Ferrera, David Oyelowo, Brie Larson, Rashida Jones, Mindy Kaling, Rosario Dawson, Omari Hardwick, Storm Reid, Emayatazy Corinealdi, Constance Wu, Janet Mock, Niecy Nash, Irene Bedard, Susan Kelchi Watson, Henry G. Sanders, etc. Jay-Z, Beyoncé and Blue Ivy are filmed in a church.	
"Apeshit"	2018	The Carters	Ricky Saiz	On the Run II Tour and filmed in the Louvre in Paris in May 2018.	
"Feels Like Summer"	2018	Childish Gambino	Ivan Dixon, Greg Sharp, Justin Richburg	Did a cameo appearance in animated form while wearing a shirt paying tribute to rapper Fredo Santana. She also appeared alongside Jay-Z in animated form.	
"Spirit" + "Bigger"	2019	None	Jake Nava; Jon Favreau	The music video was filmed at Havasu Falls, a waterfall in Havasu Creek, located in the Grand Canyon, Arizona, United States.	

=== 2020s ===
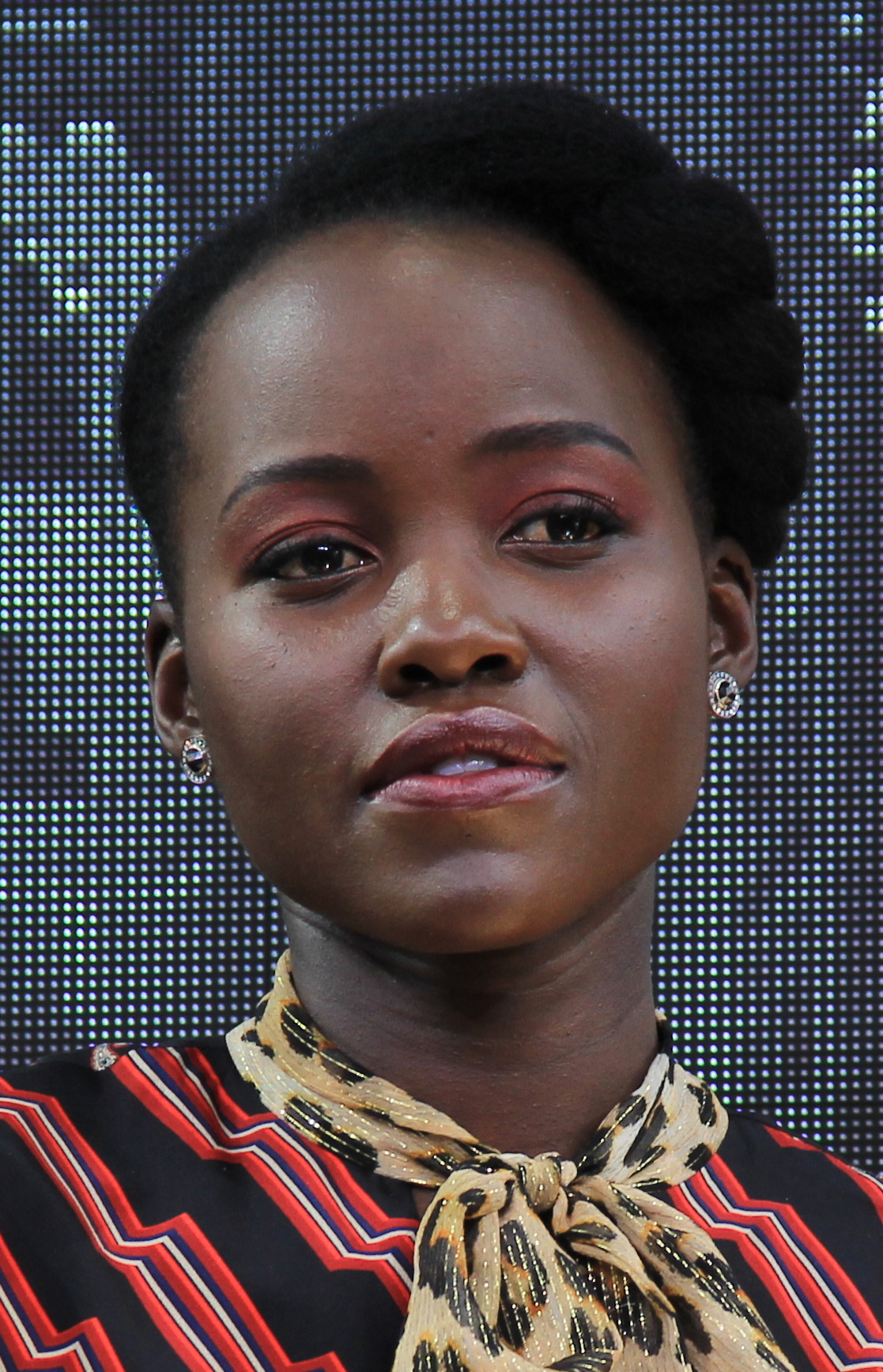
Kenyan-Mexican actress Lupita Nyong'o appears in the video for "Brown Skin Girl".

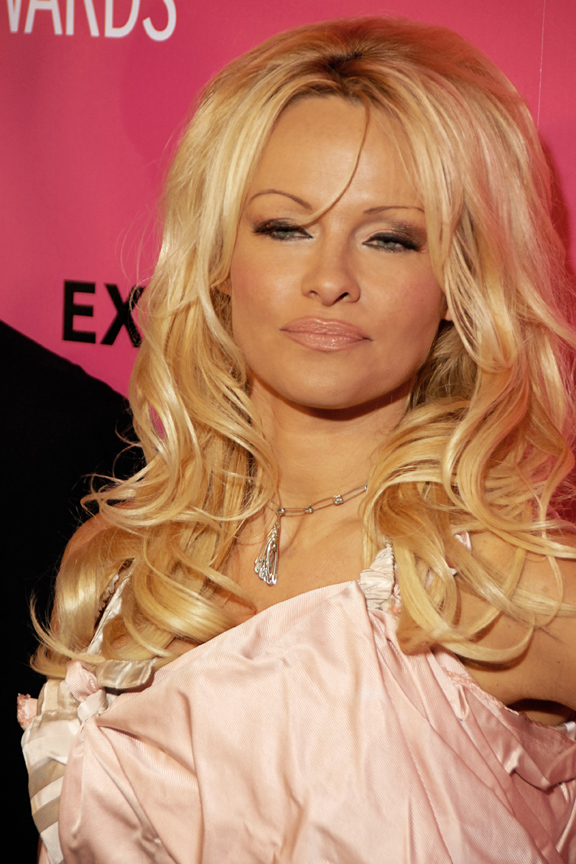
The "Beywatch" video pays homage to Canadian-American actress Pamela Anderson.

Title	Year	Other performer(s) credited	Director(s)	Description	Ref(s)
"Already"	2020	Shatta Wale; Major Lazer	Ibra Ake; Dafe Obro; Meji Alabi	First music video released from Beyoncé's visual album, Black Is King.	
"Brown Skin Girl"	2020	Blue Ivy; SAINt JHN; WizKid	Jenn Nkiru	Second video released from Black Is King. The video features appearances from Kelly Rowland, Naomi Campbell, and Lupita Nyong'o.	
"Mood 4 Eva"	2020	Jay-Z; Childish Gambino; Oumou Sangare	Beyoncé; Dikayl Rimmasch	Third video released from Beyonce's visual album, Black Is King.	
"Otherside"	2021	None	Emmanuel Adjei; Beyoncé	Fourth video released from Beyonce's visual album, Black Is King.	
"Beywatch"	2024	None	Unknown	Set to an abridged version of "Bodyguard", the low-budget promo video pays homage to Pamela Anderson, with Beyoncé referencing Anderson's costumes in Baywatch, Barb Wire and at the 1999 MTV Video Music Awards. The video, released on the Election Day, also encourages the viewers to "Vote".	

== Albums ==
=== Live video albums ===
Title	Album details	Notes	Ref.
Live at Wembley	Released: April 26, 2004; Label: Columbia; Formats: DVD, digital download	Features her concert at Wembley Arena in London as part of her Dangerously in Love Tour in support of her debut solo studio album Dangerously in Love (2003).	
The Beyoncé Experience Live	Released: November 16, 2007; Label: Columbia; Formats: DVD, digital download	Filmed at the Staples Center in Los Angeles, California, on September 2, 2007, during her world tour The Beyoncé Experience.	
I Am... Yours: An Intimate Performance at Wynn Las Vegas	Released: November 20, 2009; Label: Columbia; Formats: DVD, digital download	Filmed at the Encore Theater, Las Vegas by Ed Burke, on August 2, 2009, during a stint of Beyoncé's worldwide I Am... World Tour (2009–2010).	
I Am... World Tour	Released: November 26, 2010; Label: Columbia; Formats: DVD, Blu-ray, digital download	Directed, produced and edited by Beyoncé, is a combination of performances from I Am... World Tour, running from March 2009 through February 2010.	
Live at Roseland	Released: November 21, 2011; Label: Columbia; Formats: DVD, digital download	Directed by Beyoncé, Ed Burke and Anthony Green, and was executively produced by Beyoncé, it was filmed during her 4 Intimate Nights with Beyoncé revue, which was held at the Roseland Ballroom in New York City in August 2011.	
Live in Atlantic City	Released: November 22, 2013; Label: Columbia, Parkwood Entertainment; Formats: DVD, Blu-ray, digital download	It was directed by the singer and Burke as part of the home media release of her autobiographical television film Life Is But a Dream. The concert film contains footage from Beyoncé's four-night residency show Revel Presents: Beyoncé Live in May 2012.	
Beyoncé: X10	Released: November 24, 2014; Label: Columbia, Parkwood Entertainment; Formats: DVD, digital download	Recordings of ten live performances from The Mrs. Carter Show World Tour (2013–14). Included as a bonus disc on the Platinum Edition reissue of Beyoncé (2013).	

=== Compilation video albums ===
Title	Album details	Notes	Ref.
Beyoncé: The Ultimate Performer	Released: November 26, 2006; Label: Columbia; Formats: DVD	Features exclusive footage and concerts that were held in France, Japan, the UK and the US.	

=== Music video albums ===
Title	Album details	Notes	Ref.
BET Presents Beyoncé	Released: September 4, 2006; Label: BET; Format: DVD	Contains footage of Beyoncé backing band, Suga Mama, her clothing line, House of Deréon, and Dreamgirls, as well as appearances by Beyoncé on 106 & Park and the BET Awards.	
Video Triple Play	Released: November 21, 2006; Label: Sony BMG; Format: digital download	iTunes Store release which comprises the music videos for "Check on It", "Déjà Vu" (Edited Version) and "Ring the Alarm.	
B'Day Anthology Video Album	Released: April 3, 2007; Label: Columbia; Format: DVD	Contains thirteen music videos for songs from her second studio album, B'Day (2006) and its deluxe edition in 2007.	
Video Triple Play	Released: September 4, 2007; Label: Sony BMG; Format: Digital download	iTunes Store release which comprises the music videos for "Irreplaceable", "Beautiful Liar" and "Get Me Bodied".	
Above and Beyoncé: Video Collection & Dance Mixes	Released: June 16, 2009; Label: Columbia; Format: DVD, digital download	Contains two discs—music videos on one disc and dance remixes on the other—and "behind the scenes" footage.	
Live at Roseland: Elements of 4	Released: November 25, 2011; Label: Columbia; Format: DVD, digital download	A two-disc DVD that contains a complete concert from the 4 Intimate Nights with Beyoncé revue, bonus offstage footage, a 20-page booklet and seven music videos from Beyoncé's 4 album.	
Beyoncé	Released: December 13, 2013; Label: Columbia, Parkwood Entertainment; Format: DVD, Blu-ray, digital download	A visual album containing sixteen music videos, and a bonus song titled "Grown Woman".	

== Film ==
Title	Year	Role	Notes	Ref.
Beverly Hood	1999	Girl #1		
Carmen: A Hip Hopera	2001	Carmen Brown	Television film	
Austin Powers in Goldmember	2002	Foxxy Cleopatra		
The Fighting Temptations	2003	Lilly		
Fade to Black	2004	Herself	Documentary film	
The Pink Panther	2006	Xania		
Dreamgirls	2006	Deena Jones		
Cadillac Records	2008	Etta James		
Obsessed	2009	Sharon Charles		
Epic	2013	Queen Tara	Voice role	
Yours and Mine	2014	Herself	Short film	
Lemonade	2016	Herself	Visual album, also director	
Homecoming: A Film by Beyoncé	2019	Herself	Documentary concert film, also director	
The Lion King	2019	Nala	Voice role	
Black Is King	2020	Herself	Visual album, also director	
Renaissance: A Film by Beyoncé	2023	Herself	Documentary concert film, also director	
Mufasa: The Lion King	2024	Nala	Voice role	

== Television ==
Title	Year	Role	Notes	Ref.
Smart Guy	1998	Herself	Episode "A Date With Destiny"	
Pacific Blue	1999	Herself	Episode "Ghost Town"	
The Famous Jett Jackson	2000	Herself	Episode "Backstage Pass"	
I Love the '80s	2002	Herself	Commentator	
The Wayne Brady Show	2003	Herself	Promoting The Fighting Temptations	
All of Us	2003	Herself	Episode "Kindergarten Confidential"	
My Night at the Grammys	2007	Herself	Interview	
The X Factor	2008	Herself	British season 5	
Wow! Wow! Wubbzy!: Wubb Idol	2009	Shine (voice)		
Britain's Next Top Model, Cycle 6	2010	Herself		
Beyoncé: Shine – An Unauthorized Story On Beyoncé Knowles	2010	Herself	Documentary	
American Idol	2011	Mentor	Season 10	
Beyoncé: Year of 4	2011	Herself	Promotion for 4	
The X Factor	2011	Guest Judge	Australian season 3	
A Night with Beyoncé	2011	Herself	TV special	
Life Is But a Dream	2013	Herself	Documentary television film, also director	
Beyoncé: Finding Her Destiny	2013	Herself	Documentary	
On the Run Tour: Beyoncé and Jay-Z	2014	Herself	Concert film	
Beyoncé: Fierce and Fabulous	2014	Herself	Documentary	
The BET Life of...Beyonce	2015	Herself	Documentary	
Lip Sync Battle	2016	Herself	Season 2; Cameo	
Being Serena	2018	Herself	Episode 3	
Beyoncé Presents: Making the Gift	2019	Herself	Documentary, also director	
Beyoncé Bowl	2024	Herself	TV special Christmas Day	

== Commercials ==
Company and product	Year	Description	Ref.
Pepsi	2002	A song from Carmen: A Hip Hopera is featured in the commercial.	
Pepsi	2003	Featuring her song "Crazy in Love" and actor Gary LeRoi Gray, the commercial sees Beyoncé sip a Pepsi can after asking for directions at a rural gas station.	
True Star	2003	Shot in black and white, the commercial features Beyoncé singing "Wishing on a Star" as she tumbles around.	
Pepsi	2004	In the commercial, Beyoncé faces off Britney Spears and P!nk in a Roman arena as gladiators. However, they throw their weapons and instead of fighting, sing a rendition of Queen's "We Will Rock You".	
Pepsi	2005	After practicing a martial art with Jennifer Lopez, Beyoncé leaves with Lopez to a Pepsi bar, where they defeat a group of men in a fight. English footballer David Beckham and a rendition of "Wild Thing" by The Troggs are featured in the commercial.	
American Express	2007	Shot by photographer Annie Leibovitz in Charlotte, North Carolina, it also features the singer's mother Tina Knowles.	
DirecTV	2007	Portions of the music video for "Upgrade U" was re-shot and used as a commercial advertising high definition satellite television from DirecTV.	
Emporio Armani	2007	To promote Emporio Armani's Diamonds, she sings her own version of the Marilyn Monroe's classic "Diamonds Are a Girl's Best Friend" (1949) in the commercial.	
American Express	2008	In the ad, Beyoncé tells Ellen DeGeneres to "have your people call my people" for her concert tickets. DeGeneres begins a search to "find my people" who can get her into the show before relying on her American Express card.	
L'Oréal	2008	Also featuring Solange, it shows Beyoncé with windblown blonde hair and a skin tone that the New York Post dubbed "shocking."	
L'Oréal	2009	Beyoncé stars alongside Eva Longoria and Elizabeth Banks. The ad features the spokespeople talking about the brand's new make-up. The company stated that this new makeup features a creamy yet ultra-light texture that glides onto skin – mimicking skin tone and texture – while providing the same flawless, natural finish of a liquid makeup.	
Crystal Geyser	2009	Beyoncé appears dancing and drinking water while her song "Sweet Dreams" is played in the background.	
Rhythm Heaven	2009	Nintendo hired Beyoncé to push its wares on the mainstream market. In the spot, she adores the upcoming DSi handheld and quirky music game Rhythm Heaven.	
Helping Hand	2009	Beyoncé also teamed up with the "Show Your Helping Hand" hunger relief initiative and General Mills Hamburger Helper. The goal was to help Feeding America deliver more than 3.5 million meals to local food banks. "Halo" was used as the backing music for the commercial.	
Style Savvy/Style Boutique	2010	Beyoncé shot two commercials for Style Savvy, a new fashion video game for the Nintendo DS and Nintendo DSi. Five designs from the real-life Deréon clothing line co-created by Beyoncé herself and her mother/designer Tina, were later available for download in Style Savvy.	
Vizio	2010	Promoted Vizio's line of Internet-connected televisions. Directed by Wally Pfister and aired during the Super Bowl XLV.	
Heat	2010	Features Beyoncé writhing against a bathroom wall in a barely-there red dress to the strains of her cover of "Fever". In the UK it was deemed unsuitable for airing at a time when younger children may be viewing television.	
Vizio	2010	Directed by Jake Nava, the ad shows Beyoncé battling herself for a man's attention. Includes "Why Don't You Love Me".	
C&A	2010	In the commercial, Beyoncé features her House of Deréon range and "Single Ladies (Put a Ring on It)" while attempting to reach a diamond ring.	
L'Oréal	2010	Beyoncé applies L'Oréal Infallible lipstick in the commercial.	
L'Oréal	2011	Promoting L'Oréal Paris Féria hair color, and uses the track "Naughty Girl".	
Target Corporation	2011	Promoting the Target-exclusive deluxe edition of 4, featuring tracks "1+1" and "Countdown".	
L'Oréal	2012	Promotes L'Oréal Paris True Match Makeup, using her varied ethnic backgrounds.	
H&M	2013	Filmed in the Bahamas. Also includes her song, "Standing On The Sun".	
Pepsi	2013	Promoting the Pepsi brand through a 50-million dollar deal. The commercial featured the new song "Grown Woman".	
O_{2}	2013	Promoting the Mrs. Carter World Tour in the United Kingdom.	
Gucci	2013	Promoting Chime for Change, a Gucci campaign that works to empower women around the world. An early instrumental of "Pretty Hurts" can be heard in the background of the commercial.	
Toyota	2014	Promoting Toyota in select countries. "XO", a song from Beyoncé's self-titled album premieres in the commercial.	
Parkwood Entertainment	2016	Promoting The Formation World Tour immediately following Beyoncé's performance at the Super Bowl 50 halftime show. In the commercial, Beyoncé performs "Formation" onstage.	
Verizon	2024	Beyoncé starred in a commercial alongside actor Tony Hale for Verizon during Super Bowl LVIII, with Beyoncé attempting various tactics to "break the internet". Snippets of single "My House" are interspersed throughout.	
Beyoncé Introduces Team USA at 2024 Paris Olympics - NBC Sports	2024	During NBCUniversal's primetime coverage of the Paris Olympics Opening Ceremony, Beyoncé introduces some of the athletes representing the U.S. at the 2024 Paris Olympics, featuring a remixed version of her single «YA YA» from her album, Cowboy Carter.	
