= KTJK (disambiguation) =

Two radio stations were formerly assigned the call sign KTJK, which has been assigned to a radio station on 106.3 FM licensed to Abilene, Texas since 2023:

- KDRN, a radio station (1230 AM) licensed to Del Rio, Texas, which held the call sign KTRK from 1999 to 2012
- KABT, a radio station (101.7 FM) licensed to Abilene, Texas, which held the call sign KTRK from 2018 to 2023
