= KKHR =

KKHR may refer to:

- KCBS-FM, a radio station (93.1 FM) licensed to Los Angeles, California, which held the call sign KKHR from 1983 to 1986
- KTJK, a radio station (106.3 FM) licensed to Abilene, Texas, which held the call sign KKHR from 1999 to 2023
- KABT, a radio station (101.7 FM) licensed to Abilene, Texas, which held the call sign KKHR in 2023
