= KMXO =

Radio station in Merkel–Abilene, Texas

Coordinates: 32°28′17″N 100°00′19″W

Merkel, Texas; United States
- Broadcast area: Merkel/Abilene, Texas
- Frequency: 1500 kHz
- Branding: Radio Fe

Programming
- Language: Spanish
- Format: Christian radio

Ownership
- Owner: Zacarías Serrato

History
- First air date: June 1, 1963
- Former call signs: KWFA (–1977); KBGG (1977–1982); KMIO (1982–1983)
- Call sign meaning: "Mexico" and a variation on previous KMIO designation

Technical information
- Licensing authority: FCC
- Facility ID: 55244
- Class: D
- Power: 250 watts (daytime only)

Links
- Public license information: Public file; LMS
- Website: www.kmxoradiofe.com

KMXO (1500 AM) is a Spanish-language radio station licensed to Merkel, Texas, and serving the Abilene area.

Because KMXO shares the same frequency as "clear channel" station KSTP in St. Paul, Minnesota; it broadcasts only during the daytime hours.

== History ==
David W. Ratliff, trading as the Taylor County Broadcasting Company, received a construction permit to build a new radio station in Merkel on February 26, 1962. The call letters KTCT were assigned before being changed to KWFA, under which designation the station began on June 1, 1963. Studios were built at the corner of Baker and N. 2nd streets by Keith Hodo, who had become the head of Taylor County Broadcasting months before sign-on.

Almost out of the gate, KWFA was in financial dire straits. In November, a judge placed the young station into receivership; the receiver appointed a new manager, Bart LaRue, who switched the station from Top 40 to middle-of-the-road. LaRue became receiver in 1964 and relinquished those duties to John Curtis three years later. The largest creditor, Harold D. Nichols, successfully petitioned in 1968 to have the license transferred to him.

Nichols owned KWFA until 1977, when he sold it to Gaylon Christi and Ted Connell of Killeen. The call letters were changed to KBGG and the format to country alongside several other planned facility improvements. The country format lasted just two years before KBGG flipped to gospel music in 1979. An FM station owned by KBGG, KMIO-FM 102.3, began on May 3, 1982. KBGG became KMIO and primarily simulcast the new FM's format of beautiful music and adult standards. The change came ahead of a sale of both properties in 1983 to Bob Hanna, a Dallas media broker.

The simulcast was broken up in October 1983, by which time KMIO-AM-FM had returned to country. The country format remained on FM, while the AM station became home to the first Spanish-language radio station in the Big Country, using the KMXO call letters—a take on the former KMIO designation that also represented "Mexico". One of the operators of the new station was Manuel Hernández, who in the 1960s at KWFA had hosted the first Spanish-language radio program in the area and later did the same at KRBC (1470 AM).

KMXO, La Reina del Aire (Queen of the Air), became Hispanic-owned in 1986 when it was purchased by Ray Silva. The station received strong support from the local Hispanic community, but few non-Hispanic businesses bought advertising time. However, the station fell silent by 1991, when Silva filed for personal bankruptcy and the outlet paid back taxes under threat of seizure by sheriff's deputies. It almost was the end of the line altogether. The Federal Communications Commission canceled the license and deleted the call letters in May 1993; Silva filed a petition for reconsideration, after which the FCC reinstated the license and his authority to operate that December.

Silva sold KMXO in 2014 to Zacarías Serrato, who had already been operating it under a Spanish-language Christian format as Radio Fe since at least 1998.
