= KTLT =

Coordinates: 32.664°N 99.855°W

Anson, Texas; United States
- Broadcast area: Abilene, Texas
- Frequency: 98.1 MHz
- Branding: KTLT 98.1

Programming
- Format: Adult contemporary

Ownership
- Owner: Cumulus Media; (Cumulus Licensing LLC)
- Sister stations: KBCY; KCDD; KHXS

History
- First air date: May 5, 1988
- Former call signs: KTCE (May–December 1988); KKHR (1988–1999); KFQX-FM (1999–2004)
- Call sign meaning: "The Light", from contemporary Christian format in 2004

Technical information
- Licensing authority: FCC
- Facility ID: 53194
- Class: C2
- ERP: 50,000 watts
- HAAT: 93 meters (305 ft)

Links
- Public license information: Public file; LMS
- Webcast: Listen live
- Website: www.981ktlt.com

KTLT (98.1 FM) is a commercial radio station licensed to Anson, Texas, United States, broadcasting to the Abilene, Texas, area. Owned by Cumulus Media, KTLT airs an adult contemporary format. Studios are located along U.S. Highway 84 in southwest Abilene, and the transmitter site is in between Anson and Hawley, Texas, along U.S. Highway 277 in Jones County.

The 98.1 facility at Anson has been on the air since May 5, 1988, and has rotated formats regularly throughout its history. Built by George Chambers as an oldies station known as KTCE and soon after KKHR, it spent most of its early years on air as either an oldies or adult contemporary outlet, except for airing Tejano music at the start and end of the 1990s. In 1999, Powell Meredith Communications Company swapped the facility to Cumulus Media for the 106.3 facility, moving the adult contemporary–formatted KFQX-FM to 98.1. Aside from a brief spike, ratings were low, and the station flipped to contemporary Christian in 2004 and then to alternative. From 2011 to 2020, it was the Abilene market's first FM sports talk outlet. It became a music station again in 2020 when it flipped to active rock. The discontinuation of the syndicated rock format led to a flip to adult contemporary in 2025.

== History ==
On November 16, 1983, the Federal Communications Commission (FCC) granted Lilly Amador a construction permit to build a new radio station licensed to Anson, Texas, originally specifying 103.1 MHz. Amador sold the permit for KTCE to George L. Chambers, who owned FM stations in California and Oregon.

KTCE began broadcasting around May 5, 1988, and was branded as "Lone Star 98" with a satellite-fed oldies format. The KTCE call sign was used for less than a year, as the station changed to KKHR on December 25, 1988, with no change in format. The format was discontinued for economic reasons in March 1990; KEYJ (1560 AM) picked up the satellite-fed oldies format, and KKHR switched to religious programming during the day and Tejano music at night. The Tejano format then moved to KHXS (106.3 FM) in March 1991, making way for a return to oldies. Chambers and a new investor, Jim Christopherson, hoped that returning to oldies would strengthen listenership and advertiser acceptance in the 25–54 age group. Again, the station utilized a satellite format, though each of Christopherson and Chambers hosted on-air shifts.

Mayflower Broadcasting, a company owned by Charles Webster, acquired KKHR from Chambers for $475,000 in a deal announced in November 1991. Powell Meredith Communications Company, an Abilene-based firm owned by a married couple, purchased the station from Webster for $396,000 in 1994. Ahead of the purchase, Powell Meredith assumed operational control of KKHR under a local marketing agreement; the station was flipped from oldies to hot adult contemporary as "Star 98.1".

By 1999, KKHR had flipped back to Tejano. In February 2000, Powell Meredith swapped it and $200,000 to Cumulus Media in exchange for the 106.3 facility, then known as KFQX-FM; the two stations swapped call signs. KFQX was an adult contemporary–formatted station. As "Mix 98", it nearly tripled its ratings between the fall 2001 and 2002 Arbitron ratings surveys, from a 2.2% share to a 6.0%. But its ratings soon plummeted to a 1.6, leading Cumulus to evaluate, per general manager Trace Michaels, "the state of adult contemporary music in Abilene and its relevance to the market", which showed much stronger listenership to country stations.

KFQX-FM flipped to contemporary Christian music in September 2004, adopting the name "The Light" and new KTLT call letters. The station changed formats twice more, to alternative rock and then to sports as "The Ticket" in September 2010, creating Abilene's first sports talk station on FM. Originally using programming from ESPN Radio, KTLT switched to CBS Sports Radio in January 2013 as part of a national change involving more than 100 Cumulus-owned stations. Later in 2013, KTLT became the home for Abilene Christian Wildcats athletic events.

On January 15, 2021, KTLT dropped sports and flipped to active rock, branded as "98.1 The Phantom". The station was named for nearby Fort Phantom Hill. Sports coverage, including ACU athletics, moved to KHXS (102.7 FM). On April 20, 2025, KTLT changed from active rock to adult contemporary, branded as "KTLT 98.1". The format flip resulted from Cumulus discontinuing the Rock 2.0 syndicated format on which it had relied for its programming. It was the first adult contemporary–formatted station in Abilene in some time.
