= KWKC =

Coordinates: 32°25′14.5″N 99°43′55.3″W

- Abilene, Texas; United States
- Frequency: 1340 kHz
- Branding: Fox Sports Abilene 1340

Programming
- Format: Sports radio
- Affiliations: National sports by Fox Sports Radio NFL: Kansas City Chiefs MLB: Texas Rangers (baseball) NCAA Football: Texas Longhorns Sports Betting: VSiN

Ownership
- Owner: Radio Abilene; (WesTex Telco, LLC)
- Sister stations: KTJK, KZQQ, KABT

History
- First air date: June 19, 1948
- Former call signs: KORQ (1984–1993); KYYD (1993–1999)

Technical information
- Licensing authority: FCC
- Facility ID: 73682
- Class: C
- Power: 1,000 watts unlimited
- Repeater: 101.7 KTJK-HD3 (Hawley)

Links
- Public license information: Public file; LMS
- Webcast: Listen Live
- Website: www.foxsportsabilene.com

KWKC (1340 AM) is a sports radio station in Abilene, Texas, United States. The station is owned by Radio Abilene, through licensee WesTex Telco, LLC, and originates from studios in northeast Abilene and a transmitter on the city's south side.

KWKC is the second-oldest radio station in Abilene, beginning operations in 1948. It broadcast a news talk format from 1998 to 2022.

== History ==
On December 30, 1947, the Federal Communications Commission (FCC) granted a construction permit to the Citizens Broadcasting Company for a new 250-watt radio station in Abilene. The decision ended a year of fighting between Citizens Broadcasting and a competing applicant, the Abilene Broadcasting Company. Citizens got the nod because it had more local residents in its composition and because one Abilene Broadcasting shareholder, Gene Cagle, was involved with the Texas State Network, affiliated with KRBC, then the city's only station.

KWKC began operating on June 19, 1948, from studios at 25th and Butternut streets; it was an affiliate of the Mutual Broadcasting System. Four years later, Citizens announced its intention to file for a construction permit for a television station; at the time, just one VHF channel was allocated to the city, channel 9. However, KRBC also filed, which posed the prospect of Abilene waiting years for television. The FCC was processing television station applications in a priority order based on city, and Abilene was 89th in line. Citizens opted to withdraw its bid and leave KRBC uncontested such that television could come faster to the city; it also petitioned for another channel to be assigned.

After upgrading to 1,000 watts in 1963, KWKC had applied for an FM station when it started in 1948 but abandoned the construction permit. In 1964, Citizens was approved to build a station at 105.1 MHz, which signed on as KWKC-FM on January 1, 1965. Later that year, Citizens sold KWKC-AM-FM to Steve Gose Enterprises of Wichita Falls for $400,000. Nearly immediately, Gose made a second filing for a KWKC-aligned television station, this time on UHF channel 32.

By February 1968, however, Gose had experienced financial reverses and declared bankruptcy, seeking permission to sell off his radio holdings, the KWKC stations and KNTO-FM in Wichita Falls. An offer for the AM station only was made by Ben Barnes, then the Texas Speaker of the House, alongside state representative Ralph Wayne and two Austin broadcasters. The bankruptcy court accepted the offer; Texas Communications, Inc., was approved as the buyer by the FCC in March 1969.

KWKC, a country music station at the time, was sold in 1973 to Mithun Enterprises, which purchased its first broadcast property for $500,000. Frontier Broadcasting, the subsidiary of Mithun that acquired the station, then filed to build another FM outlet in town. The construction permit for this outlet was granted in March 1974 and went on air as KORQ (100.7 FM) on September 2.

Adams-Shelton Communications of Amarillo acquired KWKC and KORQ in 1980. The call letters of KWKC were changed to KORQ in late 1984, and the station adopted an adult contemporary format similar to that of KORQ-FM; the move got KWKC out of the country music game, with six stations in the format. Adams-Shelton sold the stations to George Bakke, who in turn declared bankruptcy and sold its five stations for $4.9 million to Adcomm IV, Inc., in 1990. Adcomm filed for bankruptcy two years later, with both stations being purchased by Bourdon Wooten.

Wooten changed the AM to KYYD ("Kid AM"). in 1993, briefly trying a children's format from Radio AAHS. The station even aired some local children's programming in the form of Planet Waycoo, which was an extension of the "Camp Waycoo" children's program that aired weekly on KTXS-TV. In January 1994, citing a lack of advertiser support, KYYD abandoned the format and switched to sports; Wooten then sold off the FM to Dynamic Broadcasting in 1996, having leased the station to Dave Martin and Dave Boyll the year before. Boyll operated KHXS (106.3 FM), an easy-listening station; the format moved to KYYD during the daytime hours after Boyll lost the ability to run the FM.

KYYD switched to talk in 1998 and reclaimed its traditional KWKC call letters the next year, seeking to appeal to the audience that once had grown up with the station. Canfin Enterprises purchased KWKC and KZQQ (1560 AM) for $850,000 in 2005.

In 2022, Canfin Enterprises reached a deal to sell its Abilene radio cluster to WesTex Telco, LLC, owner of KTJK (101.7 FM), for $350,000.
