= My Night at the Grammys =

American former TV special

My Night at the Grammys was an American televisual special that CBS aired on November 30, 2007. It was part of NARAS' 50th anniversary celebration and featured the top 25 moments in Grammy history as voted by viewers. The show was hosted by Alicia Keys, Faith Hill and Melissa Etheridge, and featured appearances by Christina Aguilera, Green Day's Billie Joe Armstrong, Beyoncé, Mary J. Blige, Bono of U2, Elvis Costello, Celine Dion, Alan Jackson, Elton John, Ricky Martin and Usher.

The top 25 Grammy performances are (the year is indicated in brackets):

- 1. Mariah Carey, "Fly like a Bird" (2005)
- 2. Celine Dion, "My Heart Will Go On" (1998)
- 3. Christina Aguilera, "It's a Man's Man's Man's World" (2007)
- 4. Whitney Houston, "I Will Always Love You" (1994)
- 5. Shania Twain, "Man! I Feel Like a Woman!" (1999)
- 6. Michael Jackson, "Man in the Mirror" (1988)
- 7. Prince & Beyoncé, "Crazy In Love/Let's Go Crazy" (2004)
- 8. Alan Jackson, "Where Were You (When the World Stopped Turning)" (2002)
- 9. Tina Turner, "What's Love Got to Do with It" (1985)
- 10. U2, "Beautiful Day" (2001)
- 11. Faith Hill, "Breathe" (2001)
- 12. Ricky Martin, "La Copa De La Vida" (1999)
- 13. Paul McCartney, Jay-Z, & Linkin Park, "Numb/Encore/Yesterday" (2006)
- 14. Eric Clapton, "Tears in Heaven" (1993)
- 15. Madonna & Gorillaz, "Hung Up" (2006)
- 16. Marvin Gaye, "Sexual Healing" (1983)
- 17. Eminem & Elton John, "Stan" (2001)
- 18. Elvis Costello, Bruce Springsteen, Dave Grohl, & Tony Kanal, "London Calling" (2003)
- 19. Usher & James Brown, "Caught Up/Get Up (I Feel Like Being a) Sex Machine" (2005)
- 20. Bruce Springsteen, "Streets of Philadelphia" (1995)
- 21. Mary J. Blige, "No More Drama" (2002)
- 22. Jamie Foxx & Alicia Keys, "Georgia on My Mind" (2005)
- 23. Barbra Streisand & Neil Diamond, "You Don't Bring Me Flowers" (1980)
- 24. Melissa Etheridge & Joss Stone, "Piece of My Heart" (2005)
- 25. Aretha Franklin, "Nessun Dorma" (1998)
