= KHXS =

Coordinates: 32.411°N 100.108°W

- Merkel, Texas; United States
- Broadcast area: Abilene, Texas
- Frequency: 102.7 MHz
- Branding: 102 The Bear

Programming
- Format: Classic rock
- Affiliations: Westwood One

Ownership
- Owner: Cumulus Media; (Cumulus Licensing LLC)
- Sister stations: KBCY; KCDD; KTLT

History
- First air date: May 3, 1982
- Former call signs: KMIO-FM (1982–1984); KIXK (1984–1985); KFQX-FM (1985–1992); KCWS (1992–1997); KFQX-FM (1997–1998)
- Former frequencies: 102.3 MHz (1983–1988)
- Call sign meaning: "Kicks", as in the country format used with these call letters on the 106.3 frequency when it started

Technical information
- Licensing authority: FCC
- Facility ID: 50790
- Class: C1
- ERP: 99,200 watts
- HAAT: 227 meters (745 ft)

Links
- Public license information: Public file; LMS
- Webcast: Listen live; Listen live (via iHeartRadio)
- Website: www.102thebear.com

KHXS (102.7 FM, "102 The Bear") is a radio station broadcasting a classic rock format. It serves the area of Abilene, Texas, United States. The station is under ownership of Cumulus Media.

== History ==
On April 3, 1978, the Federal Communications Commission (FCC) granted the Big Country Broadcasting Company, owned by Gaylon Christi and Ted Connell, a construction permit to build an FM radio station on 102.3 MHz in Merkel, where the two owned KBGG (1500 AM). The station began May 3, 1982, as KMIO-FM. KBGG became KMIO and primarily simulcast the new FM's format of beautiful music and adult standards. The change came ahead of a sale of both properties in 1983 to Bob Hanna, a Dallas media broker. The station had flipped to country by the time the simulcast was broken up in October 1983. The next year, with no change in format, the call sign was changed to KIXK for "Kicks", which the owners thought sounded better.

Bill Fox purchased KRBC (1470 AM), which he rebranded as KFQX "K-Fox", in 1984. The next year, he acquired KIXK, renaming it KFQX-FM; operations moved to Abilene and the station changed formats to adult contemporary. The transmitter was moved closer to Abilene in 1988 with a frequency change to 102.7 MHz; alleging that the move had been made without FCC permission and that Fox had failed to timely notify the FCC, a competing station complained, and the FCC's Dallas field office instructed it to go off the air for what turned out to be four hours and 34 minutes before the issue was resolved.

Esprit Communications bought KFQX-AM-FM in 1988 by assuming $1.05 million in debts; it then filed to sell the station to Ovation Broadcasting in 1989. After a surprise drop from second place in the local radio ratings, the FM flipped from contemporary hit radio to "young country" in 1992 and became KCWS "West 102". The format flip, at a time when country music was surging in popularity, helped the station increase its ratings out of the gate. However, operational changes led to a wheel of formats. Ovation sold KCWS back to Esprit and then leased it out to George Chambers and Jim Christofferson, owners of KCDD (103.7 FM), who immediately switched to a "Rockin' Country" blend of country and rock and roll. In October 1994, country was replaced completely with oldies, only to return in March 1996.

In 1997, KCWS reverted to its KFQX-FM designation and format with the blessing of KFQX television in Grand Junction, Colorado. By this time, the station was operated—but not owned—by the Abilene Radio Group, most of which was sold to Sunburst Media in 1998. However, Sunburst could not buy KFQX-FM, as its other acquisitions put it at the market limit for FMs. Instead, KFQX went to Cumulus, the other major radio player in town. After being acquired by Cumulus, it then switched call signs and formats with KHXS (106.3 FM).
