= 1870 (magazine) =

Magazine in Columbus, Ohio

- The May 23, 2007 front page of UWeekly
- Type: Student magazine
- Format: Compact
- Owner: University Media Group
- Founded: September 21, 2005
- Headquarters: 1029 Dublin Rd. Columbus, Ohio 43215; USA
- Circulation: 10,000 (2007)
- Website: uweekly.com

1870 Magazine (formerly UWeekly) is a monthly magazine based in Columbus, Ohio that primarily serves the central portion of Columbus and the Ohio State University community. Its first issue was published on September 21, 2005. The paper's writing staff is largely students from Ohio State, which are also its main audience; it is considered a student magazine in this regard, though it has no official affiliation with the university. Wayne T. Lewis is the publisher and founder. Madi Task is the Editor-In-Chief.

== History ==
The magazine published its first issue as UWeekly on September 21, 2005. At the time, it was met with a chilly reception from Ohio State's official daily student newspaper, The Lantern, where faculty adviser Sonya Humes instituted a policy banning any members of The Lantern from writing for UWeekly. Despite this initial hostility, both publications continue to co-exist relatively peacefully on the Ohio State campus.

In 2014, UWeekly became the country's only weekly college publication to publish in a glossy, magazine format.

In January 2016, the magazine was renamed to 1870 Magazine. The January 2016 issue was labeled the "Inaugural Issue"; however, the magazine's website, 1870 Now, remains at uweekly.com.

== Content ==
The sections of UWeekly include Campus News, Ohio State Sports, The Hookup (Entertainment) and Music and are included in the paper weekly. Each edition of the paper also includes an Opinion page, Instagram photos #asseenoncampus, an event calendar and a Fashion column.
