= KTJK =

KTJK-FM
- Abilene, Texas; United States
- Frequency: 106.3 MHz (HD Radio)
- Branding: 106.3 The Raider

Programming
- Format: Variety hits
- Subchannels: HD2: Rhythmic top 40 "Infinity FM"

Ownership
- Owner: Radio Abilene; (WesTex Telco, LLC)
- Sister stations: KABT, KWKC, KZQQ

History
- First air date: October 6, 1989
- Former call signs: KHXS (1989–1998); KFQX-FM (1998–1999); KKHR (1999–2023)

Technical information
- Licensing authority: FCC
- Facility ID: 64056
- Class: C2
- ERP: 50,000 watts
- HAAT: 56 meters (184 ft)
- Transmitter coordinates: 32°25′14.00″N 99°43′54.00″W

Links
- Public license information: Public file; LMS
- Website: www.theraiderabilene.com; www.infinityfmradio.com

KTJK-FM (106.3 FM, "The Raider") is a radio station broadcasting a variety hits format in Abilene, Texas, United States. The station is one of eight Abilene-area stations owned by Radio Abilene. In addition to its standard format, it broadcasts a rhythmic contemporary format on its HD Radio subchannel.

The 106.3 frequency was established by SURE Broadcasting and went on the air as KHXS "Kicks 106" with a country music format on October 6, 1989. The station then adopted a Tejano music format in 1991, only for the ownership to change formats to easy listening music the next year in order to make more money. In 1992, SURE Broadcasting declared bankruptcy, and it remained in receivership for nearly four years.

Taylor County Broadcasting began leasing KHXS in 1996, after it was sold by the receiver, and programmed a conservative talk format before switching to classic rock. Cumulus Media acquired the Taylor County Broadcasting stations and KHXS in 1997; it switched the programming of KHXS and KFQX-FM 102.7 in 1998, moving contemporary hit outlet Fox FM and the KFQX-FM call sign to 106.3. Nearly immediately, Cumulus traded KFQX-FM to Powell Meredith Communications Corporation, which moved KKHR and its Spanish-language contemporary hit radio format to the 106.3 frequency. Canfin Enterprises acquired KKHR in 2004, retaining the format.

Canfin Enterprises sold its three Abilene radio stations to Radio Abilene in 2022. The long-running Spanish-language format was relaunched and then dropped on August 1, 2023, allowing WesTex to move its "The Raider" variety hits format from 101.7 MHz.

== History ==
=== SURE Broadcasting ownership and receivership ===
On February 18, 1988, a construction permit was granted to SURE Broadcasting, owned by Susan Lundborg, for a new 3,000-watt radio station on 106.3 MHz in Abilene. A classic country format under the name "Kicks 106" and the call letters KHXS were selected, and the station rented space on the tower of KACU. The station began at 1:06 p.m. on October 6, 1989.

In 1991, KHXS switched to a Spanish-language format of Tejano music. The station's management and airstaff came from KKHR (98.1 FM), which simultaneously converted to oldies. This new format lasted less than 18 months; the same core group moved on August 1, 1992, to KEYJ (1560 AM) because the station was not making enough money for its owner. After nearly two months, businessman Dave Boyll became the new operator, adopting an easy listening format. Most of the songs the station played were from Boyll's own collection.

In November 1992, just as KHXS's easy listening format got underway, Sure Broadcasting declared bankruptcy, and its stations were transferred to a receiver. After nearly four years, the receiver found a buyer: Larry Hickerson, whose IQ Radio owned WPIQ in Brunswick, Georgia. The transaction forced Boyll to move his easy listening programming to daytime hours on KYYD (1340 AM), a sports radio station that Boyll had begun leasing in January 1995. Hickerson, for his part, already had a contract in hand to sell KHXS to another Abilene radio station owner.

=== Taylor County, Cumulus, and Powell Meredith operation ===
After the easy listening programming moved out, Taylor County Broadcasting—a related company to the owners of KBCY and KCDD—began leasing the frequency from Hickerson and operated it with a conservative talk format, "The Talk of the Town at 106.3", with nationally syndicated hosts including Don Imus, Rush Limbaugh, and Laura Schlessinger. This lasted just seven months, and in August, it was replaced with classic rock as "The Bear". That November, Cumulus Media—which simultaneously purchased KBCY and KCDD—acquired KHXS by exercising a purchase option with Hickerson.

Cumulus also took over KFQX-FM 102.7 and switched the formats of the two stations in 1998, with 106.3 inheriting the contemporary hits "Fox FM" that had been revived on the 102.7 frequency the year prior. It then traded with Powell Meredith Communications Company, which owned KKHR at 98.1; a format and call sign swap resulted, bringing the Spanish-language music programming of KKHR to the 106.3 frequency. Powell Meredith not only brought over KKHR's music to the frequency, it also brought a running dispute with the American Society of Composers, Authors and Publishers. Since 1995, the station had not paid for an ASCAP license, and it played ASCAP-registered songs under a de facto license that expired at the end of 2000. From 2001 to 2003, ASCAP contacted Powell Meredith five times and advised them not to play its songs without a license; the owners of the station rebuffed proposals to settle the dispute. In October 2002 and again in July 2003, ASCAP sent an agent to Abilene to record the station's broadcasts. An ASCAP-employed musician confirmed that the station had aired eight compositions represented by the performing rights society without permission, such as Santana's version of "Oye Como Va" and Juan Gabriel's "Se Me Olvidó Otra Vez" (I Forgot Again). In 2005, a court awarded $8,000 in statutory damages to ASCAP and the rightsholders of the compositions.

=== Canfin and WesTex Telco ===
Canfin Enterprises, a company owned by Parker Cannan, purchased KKHR in late 2004 for $684,000. In 2022, Canfin Enterprises reached a deal to sell its Abilene radio cluster to WesTex Telco, LLC, owner of KTJK (101.7 FM). On November 7, 2022, KKHR began stunting, promising "something new" and a "Great Flip" for a new format to debut on November 10; on that date, KKHR relaunched as "My 106.3", continuing to air Spanish-language hit music in a bilingual presentation.

On August 1, 2023, WesTex Telco began simulcasting KTJK's "The Raider" variety hits format on KKHR, migrating it to the higher-power 106.3 frequency. It then swapped the two stations' call signs; 101.7 changed again to become KABT after switching to a blend of Americana and red dirt known as The Patriot on August 21, 2023. The Raider was named after the Northrop Grumman B-21 Raider, a heavy bomber under development and to be housed at nearby Dyess Air Force Base.
