= Showbiz India =

Showbiz India is a television program that focuses on entertainment from South Asia, specifically from the Indian subcontinent. The show has been on the air since 1998 and its hostess and producer is Reshma Dordi, who was crowned the first Miss L.A. India in 1988.
