= Ed Burke (musician) =

American musician

- Born: Edward Burke; January 13, 1909; Fulton, Ohio, U.S.
- Died: April 19, 1988 (aged 79) East Elmhurst, Queens, New York, U.S.
- Genres: Jazz
- Instruments: Trombone, violin

Edward Burke (January 13, 1909 – April 19, 1988) was an American jazz musician.

== Career ==
Burke was adept at both violin and trombone, and played both professionally in jazz bands. He worked with Walter Barnes late in the 1920s, then with Cassino Simpson and Ed Carry in the early-1930s. He worked with Kenneth Anderson in 1934 before joining Erskine Tate's band through the end of 1935. Following a stint with Horace Henderson, he joined Earl Hines's band in 1938.

In the 1940s he played with Walter Fuller and Coleman Hawkins, and later in the decade with Duke Ellington and Cootie Williams. In the early 1950s, he joined Cab Calloway's band, then worked with Buddy Johnson a few years later.

In the 1960s and 1970s, Burke played less frequently, though he occasionally performed with musicians such as Lem Johnson and Wally Edwards.
