= KZQQ =

Coordinates: 32°27′21.4″N 99°48′0.3″W

- Abilene, Texas; United States
- Frequency: 1560 kHz
- Branding: NewsTalk 1560

Programming
- Format: News/talk; Solid Gold Oldies
- Affiliations: Fox News Radio; Texas State Network; Townhall News; Westwood One

Ownership
- Owner: Radio Abilene; (WesTex Telco, LLC)
- Sister stations: KABT, KTJK, KWKC

History
- First air date: 1948 (as KWKC)
- Former call signs: KCAD (1962–1980); KBER (1980–1983); KFMN (1983–1986); KKSL (1986–1987); KEYJ (1987–1993); KBBA (1993–1997); KMPC (1997–2000)
- Call sign meaning: Similar in appearance to "zoo"

Technical information
- Licensing authority: FCC
- Facility ID: 17803
- Class: D
- Power: 500 watts day; 45 watts night

Links
- Public license information: Public file; LMS
- Webcast: Listen Live
- Website: www.newstalk1560.com

KZQQ (1560 AM) is a radio station with a news/talk format licensed to and serving the area around Abilene, Texas. On March 29, 2010, KZQQ dropped the sports format for classic rock. The format flip brought in Dave Andrews for mornings, and Ben “Candy Man” Gonzalez hosting afternoons.

On December 28, 2010, KZQQ changed their format back to sports.

In 2022, Canfin Enterprises reached a deal to sell its Abilene radio cluster to WesTex Telco, LLC, owner of KTJK (101.7 FM).

As of October 1, KZQQ was playing solid gold oldies in advance of a transition to a reworked news-talk format previously found on sister KWKC.
