= KBCY =

Coordinates: 32.411°N 100.108°W

- Tye, Texas; United States
- Broadcast area: Abilene, Texas
- Frequency: 99.7 MHz
- Branding: 99.7 FM KBCY

Programming
- Format: Country
- Affiliations: Nash FM; Westwood One

Ownership
- Owner: Cumulus Media; (Cumulus Licensing LLC)
- Sister stations: KCDD, KHXS, KTLT

History
- First air date: 1983 (as KTYE)
- Former call signs: KTYE (1982–1985); KTLC (1985–1991)
- Call sign meaning: KBCY = Best CountrY, K could maybe stand for Kountry

Technical information
- Licensing authority: FCC
- Facility ID: 68642
- Class: C1
- ERP: 100,000 watts
- HAAT: 227 meters (745 ft)

Links
- Public license information: Public file; LMS
- Webcast: Listen live
- Website: kbcy.com

KBCY (99.7 FM) is a commercial radio station located in Tye, Texas, broadcasting to the Abilene, Texas area. KBCY airs a country music format.
