= KCDD =

Radio station in Hamlin–Abilene, Texas

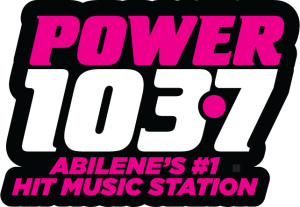
- Hamlin, Texas; United States
- Broadcast area: Abilene, Texas
- Frequency: 103.7 MHz
- Branding: Power 103

Programming
- Format: Top 40 (CHR)
- Affiliations: Westwood One

Ownership
- Owner: Cumulus Media; (Cumulus Licensing LLC)
- Sister stations: KBCY, KHXS, KTLT

History
- First air date: 1987 (as KWZD)
- Former call signs: KRRS (1984–1986, CP); KWZD (1986–1992)

Technical information
- Licensing authority: FCC
- Facility ID: 64656
- Class: C0
- ERP: 100,000 watts
- HAAT: 300 meters (984 feet)
- Transmitter coordinates: 32°43′31″N 100°04′21″W

Links
- Public license information: Public file; LMS
- Webcast: Listen live
- Website: power103.com

KCDD (103.7 FM, "Power 103") is a radio station that serves the Abilene, Texas, area with a top 40 (CHR) music format. The station is under ownership of Cumulus Media.

== History ==
Ray F. Silva won the construction permit for a new radio station at 103.7 in Hamlin in 1984. After Silva sold the permit to B&D Communications, the station came to air in 1987 as KWZD "Wizard 103", with a country music format. MHHF Media acquired KWZD in 1987, shortly after signing on. When MHHF went into receivership in 1991, B&D Communications bought back the station for $265,000 and sold it to Taylor County Broadcasting for $320,000; the new owners relaunched it as KCDD "CD103", which was originally a soft rock station but flipped to CHR in late 1992. Big Country Broadcasting acquired KCDD in 1995; Cumulus bought the station in 1998.

Previous logo
