= KABT =

KABT-FM
- Hawley, Texas; United States
- Broadcast area: Abilene, Texas
- Frequency: 101.7 MHz (HD Radio)
- Branding: 101.7 The Patriot

Programming
- Format: Texas country Mainstream Rock; Americana
- Subchannels: HD2: News/Talk "NewsTalk1560" (KZQQ); HD3: Sports "Fox Sports Abilene" (KWKC)
- Affiliations: Texas Rangers (baseball) Dallas Cowboys McMurry War Hawks football

Ownership
- Owner: Radio Abilene; (WesTex Telco, LLC)
- Sister stations: KTJK, KWKC, KZQQ

History
- First air date: December 3, 2018
- Former call signs: KTJK (2018–2023); KKHR (2023)
- Call sign meaning: "Abilene, Texas"

Technical information
- Licensing authority: FCC
- Facility ID: 198731
- Class: A
- ERP: 6,000 watts
- HAAT: 95 meters (312 ft)
- Transmitter coordinates: 32°30′38″N 99°44′30″W
- Repeater: KLBY-FM

Links
- Public license information: Public file; LMS
- Website: www.thepatriotabilene.com

KABT-FM (101.7 FM), "The Patriot" is an Americana/Texas country/southern rock radio station serving the Abilene, Texas, area and licensed to nearby Hawley, Texas. The station is owned by Radio Abilene.

The 101.7 facility went on the air at the end of 2018 as KTJK, with a variety hits format. Radio Abilene acquired the station in 2021 and relaunched it as "The Raider" with the same music format. In 2023, The Raider moved to 106.3 MHz, and 101.7 was relaunched with its present format.

== History ==
Then operating under the call sign KTJK, the station began airing content under a new commercial license in late winter 2018, adopting a variety hits format after a seasonal broadcast of all Christmas music. The license and equipment was purchased in early 2021 by WesTex Telco, which operated KTJK as variety hits 101.7 The Raider. The station was named after the Northrop Grumman B-21 Raider, a heavy bomber under development and to be housed at nearby Dyess Air Force Base.

In 2022, Radio Abilene acquired KKHR (106.3 FM) and the other Abilene stations owned by Canfin Enterprises; it began moving The Raider and the call sign to the higher-power 106.3 facility with a simulcast on August 1, 2023. On August 8, the KKHR call letters briefly moved to 101.7 MHz; on August 21, the station debuted a new format mixing Texas red dirt country music with mainstream rock and Americana music, known as The Patriot, plus Texas Rangers baseball. New KABT call letters were adopted on September 1, 2023. KABT became the Big Country affiliate for the Dallas Cowboys Radio Network in 2025.
