= Blow (Beyoncé song) =

2013 single by Beyoncé

Single by Beyoncé

from the album Beyoncé
- Released: December 13, 2013
- Studio: Jungle City (New York City); Oven (New York City)
- Genre: Dance-pop; disco; funk; R&B
- Length: 5:09
- Label: Parkwood; Columbia
- Songwriters: Pharrell Williams; Beyoncé; James Fauntleroy; Timothy Mosley; Jerome Harmon; Terius Nash; Justin Timberlake
- Producers: Beyoncé; Pharrell Williams

Beyoncé singles chronology
"End of Time" (2012)	"Blow" (2013)	"XO" (2013)

Music video
- "Blow" on YouTube

"Blow" is a song by American singer Beyoncé from her fifth studio album, Beyoncé (2013). It was written and produced by Beyoncé and Pharrell Williams; additional writers were Timbaland, J-Roc, James Fauntleroy, and Justin Timberlake. "Blow" was set to be released as one of the album's lead singles alongside "Drunk in Love", but its release was cancelled in favor of "XO". It was only released as a radio single in Italy. A remix featuring Pharrell Williams was included in the album's 2014 reissue Platinum Edition.

"Blow" is a disco-influenced R&B and funk song which has several other musical influences and elements featured in it. It received comparison to songs from the 1970s and 1980s mostly by Prince and Janet Jackson. Lyrically it talks explicitly about oral sex and cunnilingus through heavy innuendo in line with Beyoncé's sexual tone. Thanks to several promotional remixes of the song, "Blow" peaked at number one on the US Hot Dance Club Songs chart.

An accompanying music video for the song was directed by Hype Williams and released on the album on December 13, 2013. It was filmed at a roller skating rink in Houston and it features Beyoncé's sister Solange Knowles, her background dancers and her female band. The singer's style received comparisons to 1980s fashion and music videos in a similar way to the song itself. "Blow" was included on the set list of the European leg of Beyoncé's The Mrs. Carter Show World Tour (2014) and The Formation World Tour (2016). It was also performed during the 2014 MTV Video Music Awards as part of a medley of Beyoncé's self-titled album.

== Background and production ==
"Blow" was written by Beyoncé, Pharrell Williams, James Fauntleroy, Timbaland, J-Roc and Justin Timberlake. It was produced by Beyoncé and Pharrell, with co-production by Timbaland and J-Roc. Beyoncé produced her vocals, which were recorded by Stuart White, Chris Godbey, Bart Schoudel and Andrew Coleman at Jungle City Studios and Oven Studios. White and Coleman also digitally arranged and edited the track. White handled the mixing at the Mix room in North Hollywood, California. The track was engineered by Justin Hergett with help from James Krausse, Paul Pavao and Edward Valldejuli. The track features backing vocals by Williams and Timbaland. The horns are performed by Katty Rodriguez, Adison Evans and Crystal Torres and arranged by Derek Dixie. When Beyoncé was released on December 13, 2013, Billboard reported that "Blow" would be released as a contemporary hit radio single both in the US and worldwide, and "Drunk in Love" was reported to be sent to urban radio in the US only; "XO" was reportedly scheduled to be released as the second worldwide contemporary hit radio single in 2014. However, the US release of "Blow" was cancelled, reportedly due to the song's racy lyrics, and "XO" was issued to radio in that country instead. "Blow" was eventually only serviced to Italian radio.

== Composition ==
"Blow"
A 30-second sample of "Blow", a song with a disco-thumping beat and a "retro-flavoured" arrangement different from the electronic R&B songs with mid-tempo rhythm on Beyoncé. It has a throwback vintage and retro sound with a "distinct disco edge" which was noted to be similar with 1970s disco funk.

"Blow" is a five-minute and nine-second disco-influenced, R&B, funk, retro-soul song with an electro-funk groove and a jazz-influenced opening. Critics also found elements of "chilly" neo-disco in the groove with Rolling Stone writer Rob Sheffield further noting that it created an "air of melancholy". Instrumentally it is complete with a heavy bass, sparse piano chords and guitars altogether creating a blipping, marching and parping beat. Kevin Fallon from The Daily Beast described the song's production as "so bouncy it's almost coyish and flirty" and added that it was a counterbalance to the "raunchy" lyrics.

An ode to oral sex, "Blow" stands in line with the explicit theme of the album about frank female sexuality and eroticism. Lyrically, it refers to cunnilingus through heavy innuendos omitting subtlety; the lines "Can you lick my Skittles, it's the sweetest in the middle/ Pink is the flavor, solve the riddle" are sung "flirtatiously" by Beyoncé. It opens with a breathy atmosphere and Beyoncé singing the lines, "I kiss you and you lick your lips/ You like it wet and so do I/ I know you never waste a drip/ I wonder how it feels sometimes". The chorus lines are "pleaded" by the singer as stated by Fallon: "Keep me coming, keep me going, keep me humming, keep me moaning". The second half of the song contains a tempo change with a funkier beat and the singer singing verse-chorus-verse trajectories. Chris Richards of The Washington Post compared this type of songcraft with Maxwell, Erykah Badu and Frank Ocean's work. It starts with Beyoncé declaring "I'm about to get into this girls. This for all my grown women out there". During this part, Timbaland's vocals can be heard in the background as part of a call and response. It follows with Beyoncé singing the lines "I can't wait 'til I get home so you can turn that cherry out" to her man; according to Caitlin White of the website The 405, these line "exhibit deep assurance of her usual freedom". During the second part, the lines "turn that cherry out" are repeatedly sung followed by the lyrics "I'm-a let you be the boss of me". She finishes the second part by delivering, "Don't slip off when it drip off on top of you... Gimme that daddy-long stroke". The second part was further described as a "masterful recreation of mid-'80s First Avenue funk". At the end "Blow" features a French-language interlude.

The song's composition mostly drew comparisons to Prince, Janet Jackson and Timberlake. Whitney Phaneuff from the website HitFix wrote that "Blow" sounded like it was written by Prince; Writers of Spin and Variety compared it with his song "Dirty Mind" (1980) which was being used as a template for creating "Blow" and its minimalist new-wave sound with the song's parent album. The Verge's Trent Wolbe noted similarities to his song "Erotic City" (1989). Joey Guerra of the Houston Chronicle described it as a "disco-fueled ode to oral sex that erupts into a Prince-inspired funk groove". Greg Kot from the Chicago Tribune compared the song's electro-funk groove with Jimmy Jam's collaboration with Janet Jackson during the 1980s while Sheffield also compared it with Jackson's album The Velvet Rope (1997). Julia Leconte of Now magazine opined that Beyoncé "manages a Janet Jackson delivery over a Michael Jackson beat" with the song. Evan Rytlewski of The A.V. Club compared the pace of "Blow" with the songs on Timberlake's albums FutureSex/LoveSounds (2006) and The 20/20 Experience (2013). Andrew Hampp and Erika Ramirez of Billboard found similarities between "Blow" and Beyoncé's previous work with Williams on the songs "Kitty Kat" and "Green Light" from her album B'Day (2006). Tom Breihan from Stereogum compared the "organic breezy joy" of the song with the one found on Solange Knowles' extended play True (2012). It also received comparisons with "Blurred Lines" (2013), Rick James's Cold Blooded album (1983) and its guitar riff with Mtume.

== Critical reception ==
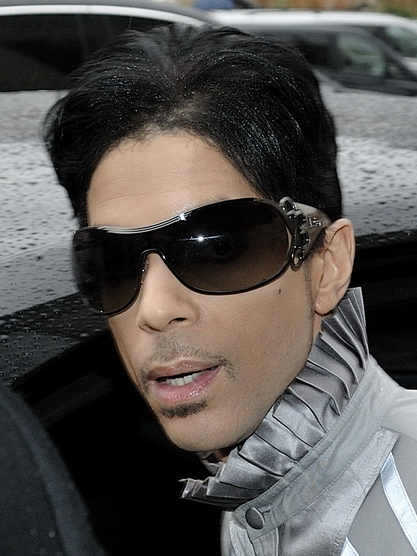
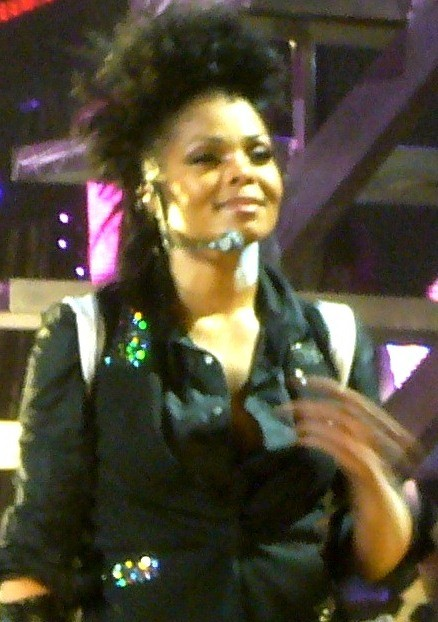
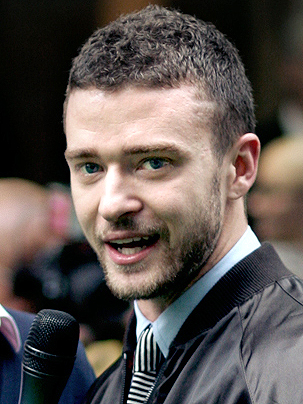
"Blow" was compared to the music of Prince (left), Janet Jackson (center) and Justin Timberlake (right), who also co-wrote the song.

Writing for Rolling Stone, Rob Sheffield called the song the best one on the album. Jon Dolan of the same website described it as the "hottest slinky Seventies electro-soul jammy". The A.V. Club's Evan Rytlewski thought that the song was "the last great disco song" of 2013. AllMusic's Andy Kellman chose the song as the best one on the album, writing that it is a "playfully risqué boogie loaded with instantly memorable lines". Emily Mackay of NME wrote: "[The] Most gleefully brazen of all [on the album]... is the soft-focus disco-tinged romp 'Blow'". Mesfin Fekadu of the Associated Press wrote that "the old school-flavored" song was one of the best on the whole album. Melissa Locker of Time described it as "one of the better tracks on the album". While reviewing the album Jody Rosen of Vulture hailed the song as "beatific" and added that it had potential to become a future hit. In another review he wrote that it "find[s] a sweet spot between nostalgia trip and future shock". Chris Talbott and Mesfin Fekadu of the Associated Press described "Blow" as "addictive". Digital Spy's Robert Copsey wrote in his review that the "hipster funk" song was the closest one to being a single from the album and one of "the most obvious chart contenders". Under the Radar editor Ryan E.C. Hamm felt that the song "could skyrocket up the charts". USA Today's Amanda Dobbins felt that the song should have been released during the summer of 2014 as "It has that feel-good '70s sound that's very popular right now".

Andrew Hampp and Erika Ramirez of Billboard magazine praised Beyoncé's "sexy" vocals on the track which they hailed as a "slinky club banger". The Washington Post writer Chris Richards described "Blow" as a "strutting, moaning disco vamp". Sal Cinquemani, writing for Slant Magazine described it as a "post-disco slink". The Quietus writer Mof Gimmers wrote, "The cocaine soul bears down again, with the excellent 'Blow' which grooves along like Kelis on a Friday night, before gnashing its teeth into the gonzo pop of Cameo or Parliament." The Guardian's Michael Cragg described it as a "delicious throwback funk" song. Mikael Wood of Los Angeles Times felt that the "sumptuous" song allowed Beyoncé "to flex her impressive stylistic chops". Spin's Anupa Mistry praised the collaboration of Timbaland and Pharrell on the "nimble and funky" track "Blow" as "mighty" and "genius". Similarly, Claire Lobenfeld from Complex who felt that Justin Timberlake and Timbaland "lost their ability to make their distinctive, infectious love-pop" on Timberlake's album The 20/20 Experience, noted that "Blow" proved the opposite: "The two have reinvigorated the overused private-parts-as-candy trope by writing one of Bey's friskiest songs ever. Add some Pharrell production... and you have one of the smoothest pieces of filth of the year." Ryan Dennehy from AbsolutePunk found "trademark" Timbaland production in "Blow" and opined, "Bey[oncé] wisely co-opts Timbaland himself to deliver a steamy hook that interlocks with her own vocals." Cosmopolitan writer Alex Rees deemed "Blow" an "awesome disco moment".

Carrie Battan of the website Pitchfork described the song's innuendo as "bawdy and overblown" but praised the singer for being sincere. She concluded, "Monogamy has never sounded more seductive or less retrograde as when dictated on Beyoncé's terms." Janice Llamoca of the website HipHopDX found "straight-to-the-point raunchiness" in the song. Philip Matusavage from the website musicOMH noted that the lyrics of the song sounded "more saucy than salacious". Ryan B. Patrick of Exclaim! felt that the text of the song "lays the sex kitten shtick a bit thick". He further described it as a "weird '80s Prince/Vanity 6 roller-skating throwback". Una Mullally from The Irish Times gave a mixed review for "Blow", saying that the album "falls off a little" with the song. Similarly, Stereogum's Tom Breihan criticized Timbaland's vocals featured in the song. In the annual Pazz and Jop mass critics poll of the year's best in music in 2013, "Blow" was ranked at number 228.

== Commercial performance ==
Despite no single release, "Blow" debuted at number 48 on Billboard's US Dance Club Songs chart in the US for the week ending February 8, 2014. After seven weeks of ascending the chart, the track went on to top the chart for the week ending March 22, 2014 after its position at number two the previous week. Promotional remixes by Dirty Pop, CJay Swayne and Romeo Blanco helped the song top the chart. This gave Beyoncé her 19th number-one single on the chart and tied her with Janet Jackson for third on the all-time list. At the end of 2014, it was placed at number 23 on the Billboard year-end chart. "Blow" also debuted at 118 on South Korea's international South Korea's international Gaon Music Chart, for the week ending December 22, 2013; that position also became its peak.

== Music video ==
=== Background ===
A still from the music video for "Blow" in which Beyoncé is seen dancing a choreography with female dancers. Their style has been noted for referencing 1970s and 80s videos.

The music video for "Blow" was directed by Hype Williams and produced by Tony McGarry. It was filmed in September 2013 at the roller skating rink Fun Plex in Houston, Texas which the singer frequently visited during her childhood. Beyoncé described the filming of the video as beautiful due to the location and added, "I was really happy to work with him [Williams] again because, growing up, he created the music video for hip-hop artists and R&B artists." Todrick Hall served as the choreographer for the video alongside Beyoncé's long-time collaborator Frank Gatson Jr. and Chris Grant. During an interview with MTV News, Hall acknowledged the singer's involvement in the filming of the video saying that she would watch the playback of the filmed scenes several times. The clip was released on December 13, 2013 to iTunes Store in addition to a clip for every other track on the parent album. On November 24, 2014 it was uploaded to the singer's Vevo account.

=== Synopsis ===
The video features appearances by Beyoncé's younger sister Solange, her background dancers, including French dancing duo Les Twins, and her all-female band. Houston-located rapper Nosaprise also makes a cameo appearance. The video opens with Beyoncé and her sister riding lowrider bicycles, getting to a roller rink where several people are already gathered. Shots of people roller-skating inside the rink with disco balls hanging from the ceiling follow. The singer is then seen performing a dance with several background dancers as they hold rollers in their hands and enter a place called "Roller City USA". Beyoncé starts skating and performing dance moves in slow-motion with several of her dancers dressed in shorts and T-shirts. Several scenes which are shot in bright black light follow as Beyoncé performs another dance sequence along with her dancers on their rollers. The second, more uptempo part of the song starts and the singer is seen arriving with a vehicle in front of a place called "Cherry". She dances atop the car and dances with her background band as they play the song on their keytars. As the song progresses, smoke starts appearing out of the car and on the scene where she is with her band. During the end of the video, Beyoncé and her sister are seen going away on the same path by which they came. Close-up shots of Beyoncé lip-syncing the song are intertwined in the video with her lips covered with a shiny lipstick.

=== Reception ===
Brent DiCrescenzo of the magazine Time Out listed the video as the album's second best further describing it as a "candied and cool disco cut stuffed with '80s cheese". James Montgomery of MTV News chose the video for the song as one of the best on the album. Jocelyn Vena of the same publication wrote that the "colorful" video which was "all about fun" and included "sexy moves", paid homage to the disco-era of the 1970s and the 1980s dance show Solid Gold. Writing for Spin magazine, Anupa Mistry found references of Hype Williams' previous collaborations with Faith Evans on "Love Like This" (1998) which was also filmed at a roller rink and Belly's blacklighting that he worked on. Lindsey Weber, writing for Vulture felt that with the video for "Blow", the singer paid homage to "Cherry Pie" (1990), a song by the band Warrant. Erin Donnelly of the website Refinery29 described the video as tongue-in-cheek and compared the singer's look with Mariah Carey during the 1990s. He described her outfits as "[t]rash-glam" and found "gratuitous booty wiggles". Jody Rosen of Vulture simply described the video and its atmosphere as "fun".

Joe Lynch of Fuse felt that the music video channeled the retro R&B vibe of the song and praised Beyoncé for "looking like a gorgeous '70s disco diva". Phaneuf of the website HitFix reviewed the music video for the song positively by writing, "'Blow' takes Beyonce back to the 80s heyday of big hair, booty shorts and roller discos. It's kitschy eye-candy, perfectly stylized". Bronwyn Barnes of Entertainment Weekly commented that Beyoncé was "the center of attention in the video" partly due to a neon tiger-print mink coat from Versace that she wore. Melissa Locker of Time magazine wrote that the singer managed to channel her inner rollergirl. Vanity Fair's Michelle Collins compared the video with the film Boogie Nights (1997) and went on to describe the scene where the singer dances on a car as a "Cinemax After Dark". In 2014, Michael Cragg writing for The Guardian ranked the video in the ten best of Beyoncé's career. He deemed it a "70s-referencing visual feast that looks like its [sic] been shot through a filter called Strawberry Hubba Bubba". He also praised the singer's "kitsch" dance moves and concluded, the clip was "[p]retty standard".

== Live performances ==
In 2014, "Blow" was added to the set list of the last, European leg of The Mrs. Carter Show World Tour. The song was merged with "Naughty Girl" (2003) with a burlesque and disco-era theme. During the end of the performance a projection of Pac-Man, the character of the game with the same name, eating cherries was projected on an LED screen on the stage. Kitty Empire of The Observer who hailed the song as one of the most explicit on the album described the projection as "funny rather than risible". Digital Spy's Robert Copsey similarly wrote that he enjoyed the projection, writing that it managed to turn "a family friendly computer game into something very different". While reviewing a tour concert, Graeme Virtue of The Guardian felt that the song along with "Partition" and "Naughty Girl", "make[s] a persuasive case for Mrs Carter, the unstoppable sex machine". Similarly BBC News' Mark Savage described the middle of the show which included the most explicit songs, including "Blow", as a "raunchy sequence". Writing for MTV News, Sidney Madden praised the dance performed by the singer along with her background dancers. Describing the singer as a "model of power", David Pollock from The Independent praised Beyoncé's "grinding through the disco-soaked majesty" of the song. In June 2014, a live recording of the song aired on Beyonce: X10, an HBO series documenting performances of the song during The Mrs. Carter Show World Tour; it was also included on platinum edition of Beyoncé (2014). In 2016, the song was performed during the set list of The Formation World Tour.

At the 2014 MTV Video Music Awards on August 25, Beyoncé performed "Blow" as part of a medley consisting of songs from her fifth studio album. For the performance of the song, she wore a bejeweled bodysuit and was accompanied by her background dancers performing a cabaret-styled choreography. Throughout the performance, the word "cherry" was lit up on the screen behind her in neon letters. In a review of the performance, Nadeska Alexis of MTV News felt that "things started to heat up" with the rendition of the song. She further praised the fact that the lights illuminated her bodysuit being "nothing short of mesmerizing". Caitlin White of the same publication found "rainbow neon sexiness" in the song's performance. Mike Wayers writing for The Wall Street Journal noted that "[t]hings started to heat up beat-wise" during "Blow".

== Remixes and other versions ==
On April 8, 2014, remix versions of "Blow" and "XO" by French musician Monsieur Adi premiered on Out's official website along Beyoncé's appearance on the cover of the magazine. The remix for "Blow" was influenced by electro house music and was described as "infectious" by the editors of the magazine. Complex magazine writer Lauren Nostro described the version as "fantastic". A remix with previously unreleased lyrics done by Country Club Martini Crew was released on January 1, 2015.

An official remix of "Blow" featuring Pharrell Williams was included on Beyoncé: Platinum Edition (2014). Allan Raible, an ABC News writer, deemed it redundant due to the minimal new addition to the original version. Lindsay Zoladz from the Vulture, panned the "inexplicable" remix as "a poorly assembled cut-and-paste job", further criticizing Williams's vocals as "awkward, labored, and even a little off-key". Critic Robert Christgau, writing for Cuepoint, was more positive towards the remix, deeming it "cuter".

== Credits and personnel ==
Credits are adapted from liner notes of Beyoncé.

Song credits

- Beyoncé Knowles – production, vocal production, vocals
- Pharrell Williams – production, backing vocals
- Timbaland – co-production, backing vocals
- J-Roc – co-production
- Katty Rodriguez – horns
- Adison Evans – horns
- Crystal Torres – horns
- Derek Dixie – horn arrangements, mix consultation
- Stuart White – recording, digital editing and arrangement, mixing
- Andrew Coleman – recording, digital editing and arrangement
- Chris Godbey – recording
- Bart Schoudel – recording
- Ramon Rivas – second engineering
- Matt Weber – assistant engineering
- Justin Hergett – mix engineering
- James Krausse – mix engineer assistant
- Paul Pavao – mix engineer assistant
- Edward Valldejuli – mix engineer assistant
- Tom Coyne – mastering
- Aya Merrill – mastering

Video credits

- Featuring – Solange Knowles, Ingrid Burley
- Director – Hype Williams
- Director of photography – Jefrey Kelly
- Executive producer – Erinn Williams
- Producer – Tony McGarry
- Production company – HW Worldwide LLC, Parkwood Entertainment
- Choreography – Frank Gatson, Jr., Chris Grant, Todrick Hall
- Dancers – Denee Baptiste, Sarah Burns, Hannah Douglass, Ashley Everett, Hajiba Fahmy, Amandy Fernandez, Kim Gingras, Kimmie Gipson, KSYN, Les Twins
- Band – Cora Coleman-Duhman, Adison Evans, Dani Ivory, Bibi McGill, Katty Rodriguez, Lauren Taneil, Crystal Torres, Rie Tsuji
- Stylists – Lysa Cooper
- Additional styling – Ty Hunter, Raquel Smith, Tim White
- Art director – Maggi Poorman
- Editor – Jeremiah Shuff
- Brand manager – Melissa Vargas
- Hair – Kim Kimble
- Make-up – Francesca Tolot
- Nails – Lisa Logan
- Color correction – Ron Sudul
- Visual effects – Kroma
- Assistant editors – Jonatan Lopez, Joe Sinopoli
- Photography – Mason Poole

== Charts ==
=== Weekly charts ===
Chart (2013–14)	Peak position
Netherlands (Dutch Top 40 Tipparade)	23
South Korea (Gaon International Chart)	118
US Hot R&B/Hip-Hop Songs (Billboard)	48
US Dance Club Songs (Billboard)	1

=== Year-end charts ===
Chart (2014)	Position
US Dance Club Songs (Billboard)	23

== Certifications ==
Region	Certification	Certified units/sales
United States (RIAA)	Platinum	1,000,000^{‡}
^{‡} Sales+streaming figures based on certification alone.

== See also ==
- List of number-one dance singles of 2014 (U.S.)
