= Suga Mama (band) =

Live Performance band

- Genres: R&B; pop; funk; jazz; soul
- Years active: 2006–2014
- Labels: Sony Music Urban (Former); Columbia Records (Former); Parkwood (Former)
- Past members: Tiffany Monique Ryan (Vocalist); Montina Cooper-Donnell (Vocalist); Crystal Collins (Vocalist); Crystal Torres (Trumpet); Katty Rodriguez-Harrold (Saxophonist); Tia Fuller (Saxophonist); Divinity Roxx (MD) (Bass Guitarist); Adison Evans (Saxophonist); Rie Tsuji (Keyboardist); Brittani Washington (Keyboardist); DANiiVORY (Keyboardist); Nikki Glaspie (Percussionist); Marcie Chapa (Percussionist); Venzella Joy (Percussionist); Kimberly Thompson (Percussionist); Cora Coleman-Dunham (Percussionist); Bibi McGill (Guitarist); Lauren "LT" Taneil Robinson (Bass Guitarist)

Suga Mama was an American all-female live performance band formed by Beyoncé Knowles in 2006. Named after Knowles' song from her 2006 album B'Day, and ranging from nine to twelve members at various times, the band contained percussionists, guitarists, saxophonists, keyboardists, and The Mamas: a trio of background vocalists. Various members of the band have appeared in music videos for "Irreplaceable", "Blow", "Countdown", and "Green Light", as well as multiple live performance DVD releases, award show performances, various TV Specials/appearances, and the Super Bowl XLVII Halftime Show. Several band-members continue to work alongside Knowles.

Following On the Run Tour (2014), the band has been disbanded, with only a select few members continuing to feature in Beyoncé's tour bands, including her most recent Cowboy Carter Tour (2025).

== History ==
=== Formation ===
Prior to the release of sophomore studio album B'Day in 2006, Beyoncé's creative director Kim Burse announced a nationwide audition for female musicians. The auditions, held in Atlanta, Burbank, Chicago, and Houston (with final call-backs occurring in New York's Sony Music Studios), searched for female keyboard players, bassists, guitarists, horn players, percussionists and drummers. The musicians were asked to re-create the performance of "Work It Out" from the live album Live at Wembley (2004) and be able to perform at least a one-minute solo. Knowles stated that her goal was to get together a group of "fierce, talented, hungry, beautiful" women and form an all-female band. Speaking about her tour and the decision to form a band, Knowles said, "I'm all about female empowerment... I know it's my responsibility to do something different. I said, 'I want a band, I want something different.'"

She further described the process of choosing the contestants during an interview, saying: "I had worldwide auditions; people flew in from Atlanta, Houston, Israel, all over the world. It was extremely difficult [choosing the winners]. [There are] so many talented women. I wanted only a nine-piece band, but the girls were so amazing, I couldn't decide. I think I'm going to wind up having 12 people so I have two [people playing] certain instruments, because [some of the contenders] were just brilliant. It's a thing called star quality, it's a thing you can't put your finger on, can't describe. When they were playing, I said, 'I want to see y'all battle.' I brought in two of every instrument and that's how I chose. You see the one that really wants it. It was so entertaining, the energy, seeing the girls battle ... God, it was the best. It was magical." The first performance of the group was "Deja Vu" at the 2006 BET Awards.

=== Members ===
- Tiffany Monique Ryan (Vocalist) (2006–Present) - Ryan, a native of Hermitage, Tennessee, is an esophageal cancer survivor, and appears in Academy Award-winning documentary 20 Feet from Stardom, as well as on 2019's Homecoming: The Live Album. A former member of now-defunct vocal group OnPoint before performing background vocals for Mariah Carey, Christina Aguilera, and Regina Belle, she graduated from William Paterson University with a degree in journalism, and is currently Beyonce's assistant vocal arranger, lead background vocalist, and choir director. Ryan recently vocally-arranged the 2025 GAP Give Your Gift Christmas Campaign commercial. (1/3 of "The Mamas", and now 1/4 of "Pure Honey" - the background vocalists for Renaissance World Tour)

Last Tour Appearance: Renaissance World Tour (2023) (Vocal Director of Cowboy Carter Tour (2025)).

- Katty Rodriguez-Harrold (Saxophonist) (2006–Present) - Rodriguez is a graduate of LaGuardia High School for the Performing Arts and the Mannes Jazz Program at the New School University in New York City, where she received a full scholarship and graduated with a BFA in Jazz Saxophone and Composition. In 2019, she received a master's degree in Music Education from Lehman College. She is currently an Adjunct Assistant Professor and Big Band Director at Brooklyn College. Rodriguez-Harrold is credited for horns on 2013 BEYONCE album track "Blow" alongside Torres and Evans.

Last Tour Appearance: Cowboy Carter Tour (2025)

- Crystal Rovél Torres (Trumpet) (2006–Present) - Torres, a native of Philadelphia, is a singer-songwriter, mental health advocate and wellness guru who writes and produces music in her downtime. Torres was also a credited trumpet player on Jhene Aiko's "Brave" from 2014 album Souled Out, as well as a credited singer on "Adoration of the Magi" from Lupe Fiasco's 2015 album Tetsuo & Youth. Torres has multiple appearances on Fiasco's 2018 album Drogas Wave and rapper Logic's The Incredible True Story, alongside additional work with Steve Lacy. Torres is credited for horns on 2013 BEYONCE album track "Blow" alongside Rodriguez-Harrold and Evans, trumpet/flugelhorn accompaniment on Jay-Z's 2017 4:44 single "Bam", as well as horns on "Summer" and "Boss" from 2018 The Carters album Everything Is Love, trumpet on 2020 single "Black Parade", and brass on "Amen" from Cowboy Carter.

Last Tour Appearance: Cowboy Carter Tour (2025)

- Rie Tsuji (Keyboardist) (2006–2018) - Tsuji, a piano prodigy originally from Saga, Japan, composed a piece at the age of twelve that was selected to become a requirement for all Yamaha piano teacher auditions. She completed a music degree from Tokyo College of Music, before coming to the United States to study Jazz Performance at Berklee College of Music (Class of 2002). Tsuji was originally Eric Benet's performance pianist before auditioning, and had to miss the Formation World Tour as she was pregnant. She was formerly Beyonce's assistant musical director, and appears on her 2019 project Homecoming: The Live Album.

Last Tour Appearance: Beyoncé 2018 Coachella performance (2018)

- Crystal Collins (Vocalist) (2006-2016) - Collins (credited as "Crissy Collins"), a frequent featured vocalist in Tyler Perry stage productions (including Madea's Family Reunion, Madea Goes to Jail, and Madea's Big Happy Family), is a former backup vocalist for Fantasia, and also appears as a credited backing vocalist on Beyonce's "Sorry" from her 2016 project Lemonade. (1/3 of "The Mamas")

Last Tour Appearance: The Formation World Tour (2016)

- Montina Cooper-Donnell (Vocalist) (2006-2016) - Cooper-Donnell, originally from Houston, Texas, vocally-arranged the 2006 Destiny's Child NBA National Anthem performance, and has subsequently vocal-produced for Kelly Rowland's 2006 Ms. Kelly album. She was featured prominently on Sailin' Da South, the 1995 sophomore album of Houston rapper E.S.G. She also appeared as a contestant on Season 10 of The Biggest Loser. (1/3 of "The Mamas")

Last Tour Appearance: The Formation World Tour (2016)

- Bibi McGill (Guitarist) (2006-2014) - McGill, a Denver, Colorado native, has a degree in Music Scoring and Arranging from University of Colorado and also accompanied Pink, Paulina Rubio and the Latin pop group La Ley in various touring and performance capacities.

Last Tour Appearance: On the Run Tour (2014)

- Lauren "LT" Taneil Robinson (Bass Guitarist) (2013-2018, 2023) - Robinson was recruited by Burse for the Black Girls Rock! concert. She also appeared in Beyoncé's 2018 Coachella performance.

Last Tour Appearance: Renaissance World Tour (2023)

- Divinity Roxx (Music Director) (Bass Guitarist) (2006-2011) - an Atlanta, Georgia native, is currently a Trustee for the Recording Academy. She recorded and toured with Victor Wooten before joining Suga Mama. She was the bass guitarist for BET's Black Girls Rock! house-band, and toured with Fantasia Burrino in 2019. In 2021, Roxx released her debut children's music album Ready Set Go!, which was nominated for the Best Children's Music Album Grammy in 2023. Scholastic Inc., the Childrens' book publisher, published two of her songs as full picture books and her second children's music album, World Wide Playdate was nominated for the Best Children's Music Album in 2025. Divinity composed, performed, and co-produced the theme song for the PBS Kids show Lyla in the Loop. which premiered on PBS Kids Television on February 5, 2024. Roxx appeared in the HBO Documentary Happy and You Know It in 2025, where she talks about her journey into making children's music.

Last Tour Appearance: I Am... World Tour (2010)

- Venzella Joy Williams (Percussionist) (2014–2018) - Williams, a Buffalo, New York native, auditioned for Diddy's Making His Band alongside friend and fellow musician Derek Dixie. When Dixie became Beyonce's music director and required a touring drummer, he contacted Williams. Williams also appeared as Evermoist drummer "Charity" in American comedy film Pitch Perfect 3, and appeared in the music video for Ed Sheeran's single "Blow".

Last Tour Appearance: On the Run II Tour (2018)

- Tia Fuller (Saxophonist) (2006–2010) - Fuller is currently a faculty member in the ensembles department at Berklee College of Music, and was a Featured Jazz Musician in Pixar's full length computer-animated feature Soul. Additionally, she served as assistant musical director for Esperanza Spalding’s Radio Music Society Tour, and has recorded five albums: Healing Space, Decisive Steps, Angelic Warrior, Pillar of Strength, and Diamond Cut, which received a Grammy nomination for Best Jazz Instrumental Album.

Last Tour Appearance: I Am... World Tour (2010)

- Nikki Glaspie (Percussionist) (2006-2010) - Glaspie, a 2005 graduate of Berklee College of Music, relocated to New York at the conclusion of her program, where she responded to an open call for Beyoncé's all-female band. After five years as a band member and several other touring opportunities, Glaspie broke out on her own in 2012 with band Dumpstaphunk, and the Nth Power, a funk, jazz, and soul collective from New Orleans. Glaspie is credited for drumming on singles "1+1" and "Love On Top", as well as "Lay Up Under Me" from Knowles' album 4.

Last Tour Appearance: I Am... World Tour (2010)

- Marcie Chapa (Percussionist) (2006-2010) - Chapa, a Houston native, began pursuing her career at twelve, winning school competitions and contests that financed her way to the New School for Jazz and Contemporary School of Music in New York City. After leaving the group, she became a high school music educator by day and professional percussionist on weekends. She is currently the principal percussionist for Stephanie Mills’ band, and also played recently with CeeLo Green.

Last Tour Appearance: I Am... World Tour (2010)

- Kimberly Thompson (Percussionist) (2006-2010) - Thompson, a native of Los Angeles, CA, graduated from the Manhattan School of Music in 2003 with a bachelor's degree in jazz composition, teaching and performing internationally in over 33 countries.

Last Tour Appearance: I Am... World Tour (2010)

- Brittani Washington (Keyboardist) (2006-2010) - Washington, a Port Arthur, Texas, native and backing-band fixture at the annual BET Black Girls Rock! Awards Ceremony, has accompanied many artists including (but not limited to) Mary Mary, Kanye West, Gladys Knight, Tyrese, and Erykah Badu, and is a backing vocalist for CeeLo Green.

Last Tour Appearance: I Am... World Tour (2010)

- DANiiVORY (Keyboardist) (2012-2014) - Theresa Danielle Flaminio Romack, a Pittsburgh, Pennsylvania, native, graduated from Miami University (Ohio) with a degree in Zoology and a minor in Music Composition. After completing post-graduate work in vocal performance at Duquesne University, she was awarded a scholarship from Berklee College of Music, receiving an additional Music Bachelor's Degree in Contemporary Writing, Production, and Performance. She toured with the band from 2012-2014, and has also toured with Imagine Dragons and CeeLo Green, among others.

Last Tour Appearance: The Mrs. Carter Show World Tour (2014)

- Cora Coleman-Dunham (Percussionist) (2013-2014) - Coleman-Dunham graduated as valedictorian of her senior class and received her Bachelor of Arts degree at Howard University. She is most recognized for her drumming with artist Prince, but was also the 2013 band-leader for The Mrs. Carter Show World Tour.

Last Tour Appearance: The Mrs. Carter Show World Tour (2014)

- Adison Evans (Alto Saxophonist) (2013-2014) - Evans, a Juilliard School graduate, debuted in the band during the 2013 Super Bowl Halftime Show. She worked with the group for two and a half years, appearing in the “Mrs Carter Show World Tour” as well as the “On The Run” Tour. She has released two albums, Hero (2016) and Meridian (2018). Evans is credited for horns on 2013 BEYONCE album track "Blow" alongside Rodriguez-Harrold and Torres.

Last Tour Appearance: On the Run Tour (2014)

== Timeline ==
Tiffany Monique Riddick (The Mamas - Vocals)
Crystal "Crissy" Collins (The Mamas - Vocals)
Montina Cooper-Donnell (The Mamas - Vocals)
Katty Rodriguez-Harrold (Saxophone)
Crystal "Rovel" Torres (Trumpet)
Rie Tsuji (Keyboard / Piano)
Bibi McGill (Guitar)
Divinity Roxx (Bass Guitar)
Tia Fuller (Saxophone)
Nikki Glaspie (Percussion)
Marcie Chapa (Percussion)
Kimberly Thompson (Percussion)
Brittani Washington (Keyboard / Piano)
DANiiVORY (Keyboard / Piano)
Lauren "LT" Taneil (Bass Guitar)
Cora Coleman-Dunham
Adison Evans (Alto Saxophone)
V. Joy
│
2006
│
2007
│
2008
│
2009
│
2010
│
2011
│
2012
│
2013
│
2014
│
2015
Band members and live performance/tour appearances

== Tours & Residencies ==
- The Beyoncé Experience (2007)
- I Am... Yours (2009)
- I Am... (2009-2010)
- 4 Intimate Nights with Beyoncé (2011)
- Revel Presents: Beyoncé Live (2012)
- The Mrs. Carter Show World Tour (2013-2014)
- On the Run Tour (2014)
