= Tiffany Monique =

American singer

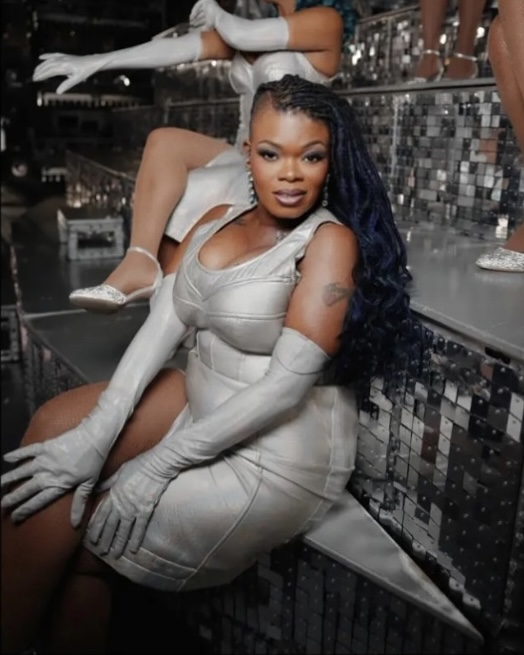
- Monique in 2023

Background information
- Born: Tiffany Monique Marshall; Nashville, Tennessee, U.S.
- Genres: R&B; Soul; Gospel
- Occupations: Singer, songwriter, background vocalist
- Years active: 1995–present
- Website: tiffanymonique.com

Tiffany Monique Ryan is an American singer, songwriter, and performer. She has performed as a background vocalist for several artists including Mariah Carey, Christina Aguilera, Brandy and Beyonce. She has performed with Beyoncé as her lead background vocalist since 2007, as one of "The Mamas", as "Sweet Tea" with Beyonce's group, "Pure Honey", and as the vocal director for the Renaissance World Tour. Tiffany released an EP, Nemesis in June 2010 and followed with various single releases in 2011 and 2016. She is an esophageal cancer survivor.

== Early life ==
Tiffany was born to Martha Marshall (née Johnson) and Jerry Marshall in Hermitage, Tennessee. She was musically influenced at an early age by her aunt, Beverly, who was a singer, musician and a former backing vocalist for Chaka Khan. At the age of three, Monique sang her first church solo in church, launching her love for music. She later moved to Newark, New Jersey and began attending Tabernacle Baptist Church in Newark, joining the children's choir.

Tiffany attended Immaculate Conception High School in Montclair, New Jersey. She was later awarded a full scholarship to Morgan State University in Baltimore, Maryland, where she majored in music education. Tiffany also received a Bachelor of Arts degree in Journalism from William Paterson University in Wayne, New Jersey 2004.

== Background vocalist ==
While attending Morgan State University, Monique was a part of a girls group, OnPoint and was featured on K-Ci & JoJo's "Fee Fie Foe Fum" Remix on MCA Records in 1998. The group disbanded in 1999 citing creative differences.

After college, Tiffany worked as an administrative assistant from 2002 to 2006 at a pharmaceutical company, while continuing to pursue music part time. During that period, she expanded her resume as a professional singer by performing as a backing vocalist for Mariah Carey, Christina Aguilera, Regina Belle, and Jeff Fox. In March 2007, while working at the pharmaceutical company, Monique was contacted by Beyoncé's music director and asked to join the band for Beyoncé's upcoming tour, The Beyoncé Experience. Monique immediately resigned from the pharmaceutical company and joined the band. She has performed with Suga Mama for a total of seven tours, including the Beyoncé Experience Tour (2007), I Am...Sasha Fierce Tour (2009), the I Am... Yours performance in Las Vegas, Mrs. Carter Show World Tour, On The Run Tour and The Formation World Tour. She also performed with her for the 2013 Super Bowl halftime show and several other iconic performances.

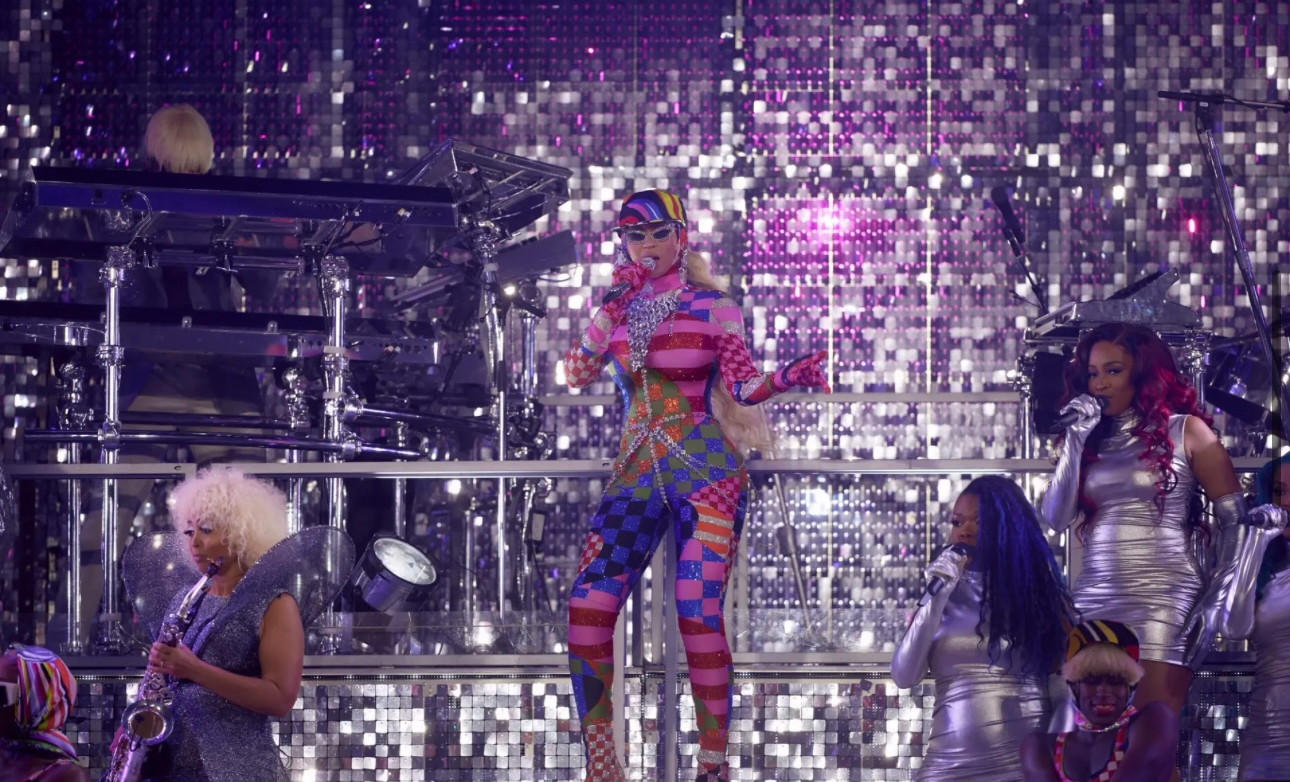
Tiffany performing with Beyonce at the Renaissance World Tour in 2023

Monique became the assistant vocal arranger and lead background vocalist for Beyoncé in 2018. Since her promotion, she trained and arranged the choir that was assembled for Beyoncé's Coachella "Beychella" performances in Palm Springs, CA. She was also the lead background vocalist for Beyonce and Jay-Z's "On The Run 2" World Tour and performed as lead background vocalist and assistant vocal arranger with the singer for Kobe Bryant's memorial at the Staples Center in 2020. Tiffany was elevated to Vocal Director for the Renaissance World Tour in 2023 and performed as one of Beyonce's background vocalists, Pure Honey.

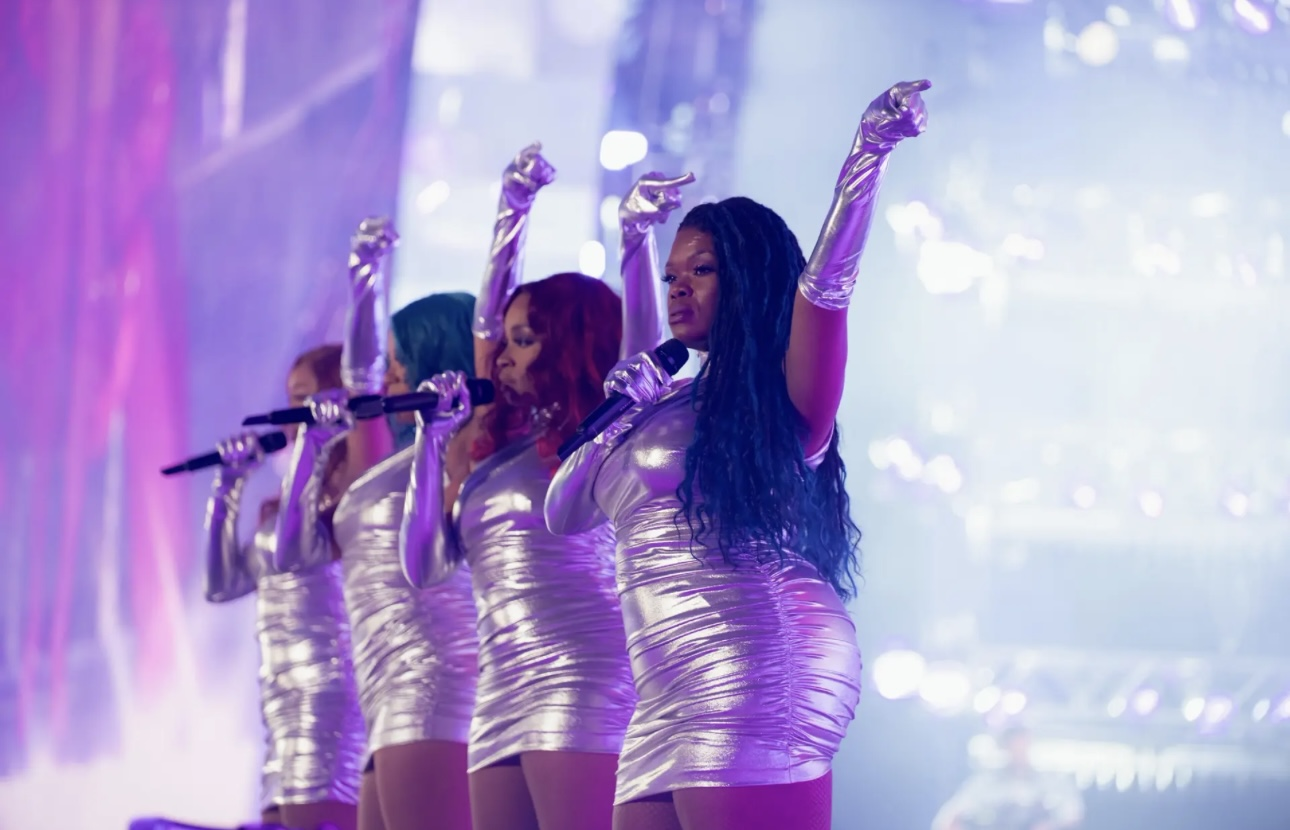
Tiffany Monique performing with other background vocalists, Pure Honey, at the Renaissance World Tour in 2023.

As a long time background vocalist for many recording artist, Tiffany's story as a background vocalist was highlighted in in 20 Feet From Stardom, which won Best Music Film in 2014 for the Grammy Awards and an Academy Awards for Best Documentary Feature.

== Solo career ==
Following the I Am...Sasha Fierce Tour, Monique began her career as a solo recording artist. She released the EP Nemesis" in June 2010, which featured five songs written by her and produced by her then friend and producer, Kwiz. In July of that same year, Monique released her first music video, "Nemesis", via YouTube and social media. She released her second single and video, "Anytime", the following year.

Tiffany underwent a dramatic brand overhaul following the release of her debut EP, including an almost 100-lb weight loss. She became a spokespoerson for Sparkpeople and was also featured in the book Beyond Sugar Shock by Connie Bennett, which focused on persons who experienced improved health and fitness after conquering sugar addiction.

In March 2016, in celebration of her 1-year cancer treatment anniversary, Monique released "Braving The Storm", with proceeds from the song being donated to the American Cancer Society. In September 2016, Tiffany's husband, producer/composer Kwiz, released a socially-charged album entitled Blacklight Chronicles, which featured Monique on two of its best performing songs: "Pushin' On" and "After Amen".

In 2019, Monique's song "Nemesis", from her debut EP of the same title, regained success after being featured by the NBA during a James Harden highlight reel in March.

== Personal life ==
Tiffany has one son, Jordan, from her first marriage. She is currently married to music producer Kevin "Kwiz" Ryan. She is also a long-time esophageal cancer survivor, after being diagnosed and treated in 2015.

Tiffany is a member of Alpha Kappa Alpha sorority.

== Discography ==
- Nemesis (EP) (2010)
- "I Feel A Spark" (single) (2011)
- "Braving The Storm" (single) (2016)
- "Your Love" (single) (2022)
- "Magic Moment" (single) (2024)

== Filmography ==
Year	Film	Role
2007	The Beyonce Experience Live	Background Vocalist
2009	I Am... Yours: An Intimate Performance at Wynn Las Vegas	Background Vocalist
2010	Beyonce Live At Roseland: Elements of 4	Background Vocalist
2013	20 Feet from Stardom	Herself
2013	Beyonce: Life Is But A Dream	Background Vocalist
2014	On The Run Tour: Beyonce and Jay-Z	Background Vocalist
2018	Homecoming: A Film By Beyonce	Assistant Vocal Arranger / Lead BGV
2023	Renaissance: A Film by Beyoncé	Vocal Director / Sweet Tea (Pure Honey - BGVs)
