= Carol Duboc =

American singer

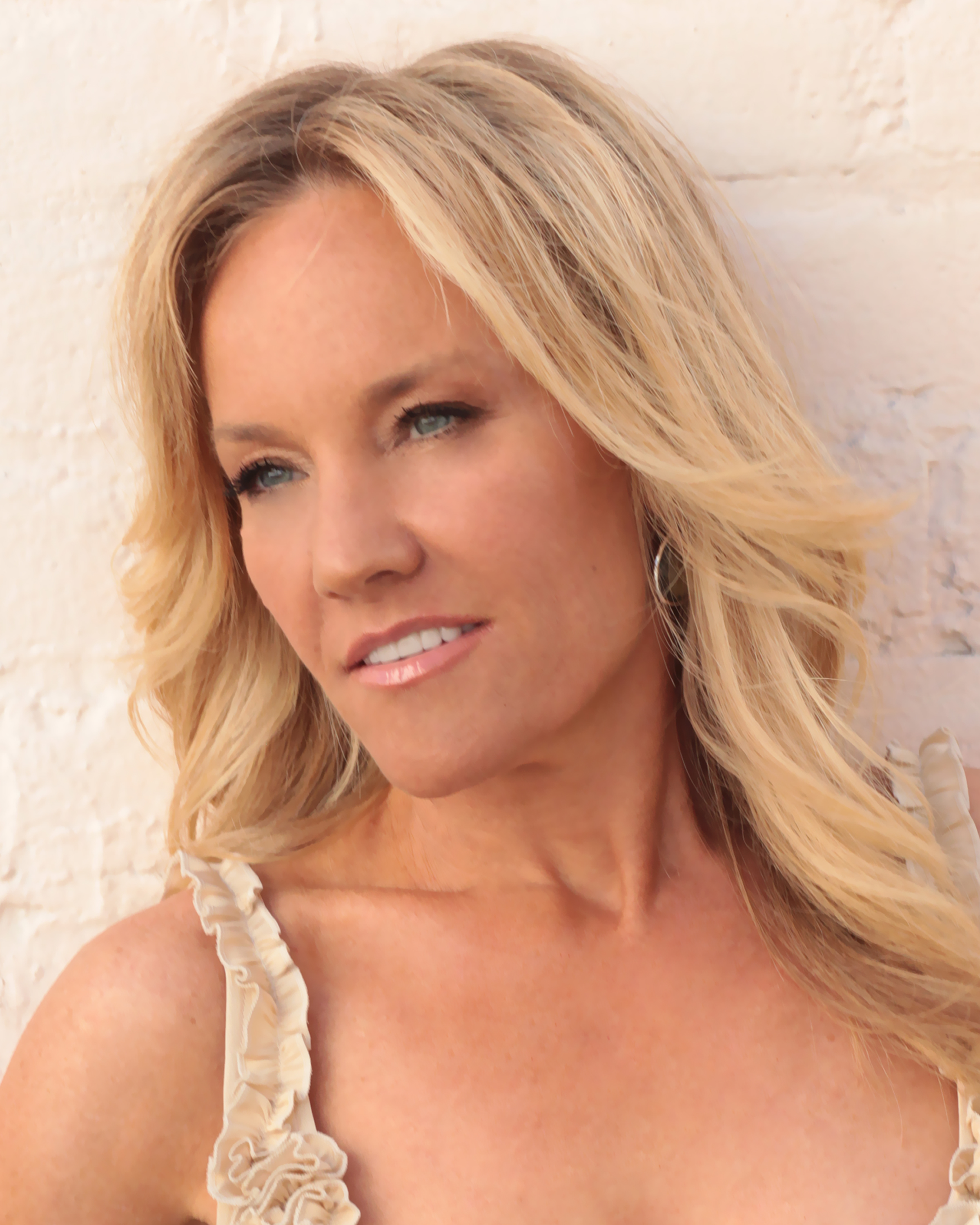
- Duboc in southern California, 2014

Background information
- Born: Kansas City, Missouri, U.S.
- Genres: Vocal jazz, smooth jazz, R&B
- Occupations: Musician, singer, songwriter
- Instruments: Piano, vocals
- Years active: 2000
- Label: Gold Note
- Website: carolduboc.com

Carol Duboc is a singer and composer.

She has co-written several hit songs, including "Precious", sung by Chanté Moore, which was certified gold in 1994 and reached No. 20 on the Billboard R&B chart in 1993; "That Boy" by Jade (platinum, 1994); "This World Is All" by Patti LaBelle (gold, 1994); Billboard R&B chart, No. 7); "Never Do You Wrong" by Stephanie Mills (Billboard R&B chart, No. 34); and "Fly Away" by Tom Jones (Billboard UK, No. 11).

Duboc appeared in the movie Be Cool (2005) and on the soundtrack for the songs "Best of My Love" and "Lady Marmalade". She was a guest artist on the compilations albums Ladies Jazz Vol. 4 and 5.

Her first solo album, With All That I Am, appeared in 2001, and was followed by Duboc (2002), All of You (2005), Songs for Lovers (2008), Burt Bacharach Songbook (2009), Smile (2013), Colored Glasses (2015), and Open the Curtains (2016).

She co-wrote and co-produced Smile with keyboardist Jeff Lorber. "Elephant" was the first single and it peaked at No. 28 on the Billboard Smooth Jazz chart. She also co-wrote and co-produced Colored Glasses with Jeff Lorber.

In 2016, she released Open the Curtains, which consisted of an all-female ensemble that included Mindi Abair, Jennifer Batten, Sheila E., Bibi McGill, Patrice Rushen, and Rhonda Smith.
