= Bam (song) =

2017 single by Jay-Z Featuring Damian Marley

Single by Jay-Z featuring Damian Marley

from the album 4:44
- Released: June 30, 2017
- Studio: [No I.D.'s studio (Hollywood, California)
- Genre: Fusion: Hip-Hop / Dub / Dancehall
- Length: 3:55
- Label: Roc Nation
- Songwriters: Shawn Carter; Dion Wilson; Winston Riley; Ophlin Russell; Damian Marley; Jacob Miller; Roger Lewis
- Producer: No I.D.

Jay-Z featuring Damian Marley singles chronology
"4:44" (2017)	"Bam" (2017)	"Top Off" (2018)

Music video
- "Bam" on YouTube

"Bam" is a song by American hip hop artist Jay-Z from his thirteenth studio album, 4:44 (2017). The song prominently features Damian Marley and samples verses from works by Sister Nancy, Jacob Miller (musician), and Inner Circle (band). "Bam" was accompanied by a six minute documentary-style video filmed in Jamaica. The song originally received mixed reviews despite later certifying Gold in the United States.

== Conception ==
No I.D., the producer of the album 4:44, stated that he felt "Bam" was "the most difficult" song on the album to assemble, and credits Jay-Z's wife Beyoncé with spurring the completion of the track: ". . . she was like, 'Man, just give me that beat. You messing around.' And I saw the smoke coming out Jay’s nostrils, and the next morning he had the raps.'"

Marley recalled that his appearance on the track resulted from a meeting in California where Jay-Z asked Marley to drop by the studio and listen to the album:

"[Jay-Z] had the idea for the hook for the song already. He knew what he wanted for the hook, so I did that for him. And then he said, 'OK can you just freestyle over the beat?' So they played the beat down and looped it out for like 15 minutes. So I'm just freestyling, singing all kind of garbage. And then they edited my freestyles and made my verse. So it was kind of cool, yeah. Easy work."

== Samples and Collaborations ==
The song's title references a sample of "Bam Bam" by Jamaican musician Sister Nancy, who described her participation on the track as "a blessing."

The song's hook, sung by Damian Marley, is an interpolation of the 1976 song "Tenement Yard'' by Jacob Miller and Inner Circle, with Marley singing "Gangsta cant live inna tenement yard" in place of the original "Dreadlocks cant live inna tenement yard."

"Bam" also samples "Prerogative" (1991) by Nicodemus, Super Cat, and Junior Demus.

Additional artists who appear on the song include: RØVÉL (Trumpet and Flugelhorn); Kenneth Whalum III (Tenor Saxophone); Nate Mercereau (French Horn); Jona Levine (Trombone); Michael “Law” Thomas (Additional Recorder); and Casey (Assistant Engineer).

Steve Wyreman, No I.D.'s Cocaine 80s collaborator, plays guitar and keyboards on the track.

Jay-Z and Damian Marley introduced the song on Saturday Night Live in October 2017 as the first musical guests of the show's 43rd season.

The song was performed on the lead night of Jay-Z and wife Beyoncé's On the Run II Tour tour in Cardiff, UK in 2018.

Marley is a co-owner of Tidal, the music streaming service acquired by Jay-Z in 2015.

== Meaning and Lyrics ==
=== "Sometimes you need your ego / Gotta remind these fools" ===
Jay-Z described the song, in part, as an internal dialogue between his private and public personae: ". . . it’s secretly Shawn Carter saying, ‘Man, you need a bit of ego.’ It was because of me and the things that I’ve done, this is Jay-Z saying you needed a bit of ego for us to arrive at this point."

The 'ego-building' sentiments expressed in the song serve as a counterpoint to a separate song on the same album called "Kill JAY Z," which is about killing off the ego, "so we can have this conversation in a place of vulnerability and honesty."

=== "What a Bam Bam / I don't give a goddamn" ===
The song's title references "Bam Bam," a Jamaican Patois term which often refers to a ruckus or commotion, the meaning ascribed to Sister Nancy's use of the term on her 1982 record of the same name.

=== "Gangsta nuh live in a tenement yard ...Too much watchie watchie watchie / Too much su-su su-su su" ===
The interpolation of Jacob Miller's "Tenement Yard" highlights the lack of privacy found in a Jamaican Tenement yard, a traditional high-density, low-income housing arrangement similar to urban Projects found in the United States.

=== "Y'all be talkin crazy under them IG pictures" ===
The reference to "IG pictures" reportedly references negative comments about Jay-Z which appeared under archival photos of '90s hip-hop artists posted on Instagram by user "tellemblancosentya."

== Video ==
In June 2017 the video "Bam (ft. Damian Marley)" was filmed on location in West Kingston, Jamaica. The video features Jay-Z and Marley visiting Trenchtown, Hellshire Beach, and Tuff Gong studios. The six minute documentary-style video was directed by Rohan Blair-Mangat, produced by Natan Schottenfels, and includes footage of Sister Nancy discussing her art and creative process.

About the video's production and meeting Jay-Z, Sister Nancy recounted, "I spent three days down there with him. It was nice, but a man is just a man. Jay-Z is just a man, same as you. He’s no different.”

Joshua James Richards was the Director of Photography of the video, which was released on August 24, 2017.

== Reception ==
"Bam" certified Gold in the United States on December 4, 2023.

Vibe (magazine), presented a critical review of the song, noting that although "the song itself is one of the most boisterous offerings [on the album], 'Bam' falls short when compared to the more refined compositions by No I.D. that made the final cut [of the album]."

== Charts ==
Chart (2017)	Peak position
UK Singles (OCC)	93
UK Hip Hop/R&B (OCC)	33
US Billboard Hot 100	47
US Hot R&B/Hip-Hop Songs (Billboard)	21

== Certifications ==
Region	Certification	Certified units/sales
United States (RIAA)	Gold	500,000^{‡}
^{‡} Sales+streaming figures based on certification alone.

== Release history ==
Region	Date	Format	Label	Ref.
United States	September 26, 2017	Rhythmic contemporary radio	Roc Nation	
United States	September 26, 2017	Urban contemporary radio	Roc Nation	
