= 4:44 (song) =

2017 single by Jay-Z

Single by Jay-Z

from the album 4:44
- Released: July 11, 2017
- Genre: Conscious hip hop
- Length: 4:44
- Label: Roc Nation; Def Jam
- Songwriters: Shawn Carter; Dion Wilson; Kanan Keeney
- Producer: No I.D.

Jay-Z singles chronology
"Biking" (2017)	"4:44" (2017)	"Bam" (2017)

Music video
- "4:44" on YouTube

"4:44" is a song by American hip hop artist Jay-Z, released as the lead single from his thirteenth studio album of the same name. It was written by Jay-Z and its producer No I.D. The song contains a sample of "Late Nights and Heartbreak", written by Kanan Keeney—who is credited as a songwriter—and performed by Hannah Williams and The Affirmations, along with an uncredited interpolation from "(At Your Best) You Are Love" by the Isley Brothers. The title of the song is the same as the song's length. 4:44 received universal acclaim for Jay-Z’s lyricism about his regret of infidelity to Beyoncé and the sample-based production. Following the release of the album, the song charted in Belgium, Canada, France, the United Kingdom, and the United States. It received nominations for Song of the Year and Best Rap Performance at the 60th Annual Grammy Awards.

== Personnel ==
- Kim Burrell – additional vocals
- James Fauntleroy – Kim Burrell vocal production
- Gimel "Young Guru" Keaton – recording
- Jimmy Douglass – mixing
- Dave Kutch – mastering

== Charts ==
Chart (2017)	Peak position
Belgium (Ultratop 50 Flanders)	84
Canada (Canadian Hot 100)	69
France (SNEP)	84
UK Singles (OCC)	73
UK Hip Hop/R&B (OCC)	18
US Billboard Hot 100	35
US Hot R&B/Hip-Hop Songs (Billboard)	15

== Certifications ==
Region	Certification	Certified units/sales
New Zealand (RMNZ)	Gold	15,000^{‡}
United Kingdom (BPI)	Silver	200,000^{‡}
United States (RIAA)	Platinum	1,000,000^{‡}
^{‡} Sales+streaming figures based on certification alone.

== Awards ==
Award	Date of ceremony	Category	Result
Grammy Awards	January 28, 2018	Song of the Year	Nominated
Grammy Awards	January 28, 2018	Best Rap Performance	Nominated

== Release history ==
Region	Date	Format	Label(s)	Ref.
United States	July 11, 2017	Rhythmic contemporary	Roc Nation; Def Jam	
