= XO (song) =

2013 single by Beyoncé

Single by Beyoncé

from the album Beyoncé
- A-side: "Drunk in Love" (double A-side)
- Released: December 16, 2013
- Recorded: 2013
- Studio: Trackdown (Sydney); Tritonus (Berlin); Jungle City (New York City); Oven (New York City)
- Genre: Pop; electro-rock
- Length: 3:36
- Label: Parkwood; Columbia
- Songwriters: Ryan Tedder; Beyoncé Knowles; Terius Nash
- Producers: Ryan Tedder; Beyoncé Knowles; The-Dream

Beyoncé singles chronology
"Blow" (2013)	"XO" / "Drunk in Love" (2013)	"Part II (On the Run)" (2014)

Music video
- "XO" on YouTube

"XO" is a song by the American singer Beyoncé from her fifth studio album, Beyoncé (2013). Columbia Records released it to US pop radio on December 16, 2013. Beyoncé, Ryan Tedder, and Terius "The-Dream" Nash wrote and produced "XO", a mid-tempo pop and electro-rock ballad that is instrumented by synthesizers and drums. It incorporates elements of hip-hop and dancehall and has a call and response chorus. A love song, its lyrics detail a narrator's plea for a lasting and stable romance amidst the ups and downs of life.

Music critics generally acclaimed the radio- and stadium-friendly production and the intimate lyricism of "XO". The track's beginning contains an audio sample from the Space Shuttle Challenger disaster, which was criticized by the families of the lost crew and NASA. Beyoncé released a statement saying that the sample was meant to be a tribute to the Challenger crew. "XO" charted and received platinum certifications in Australia, Canada, New Zealand, and the UK. In the US, the single peaked at number 45 on the Billboard Hot 100 and has been certified double platinum.

Terry Richardson directed the music video for "XO", filmed in Coney Island in late August 2013. It was made available on iTunes on December 13, 2013 and released online three days later. On the Mrs. Carter Show World Tour, Beyoncé performed the song during the last stops of the North American leg in December 2013 and the second European leg in early 2014. She also performed the song at the Brit Awards 2014 and the 2014 MTV Video Music Awards. In 2014, Haim covered the song during their several concerts, and John Mayer released his cover version as a single.

== Production and release ==
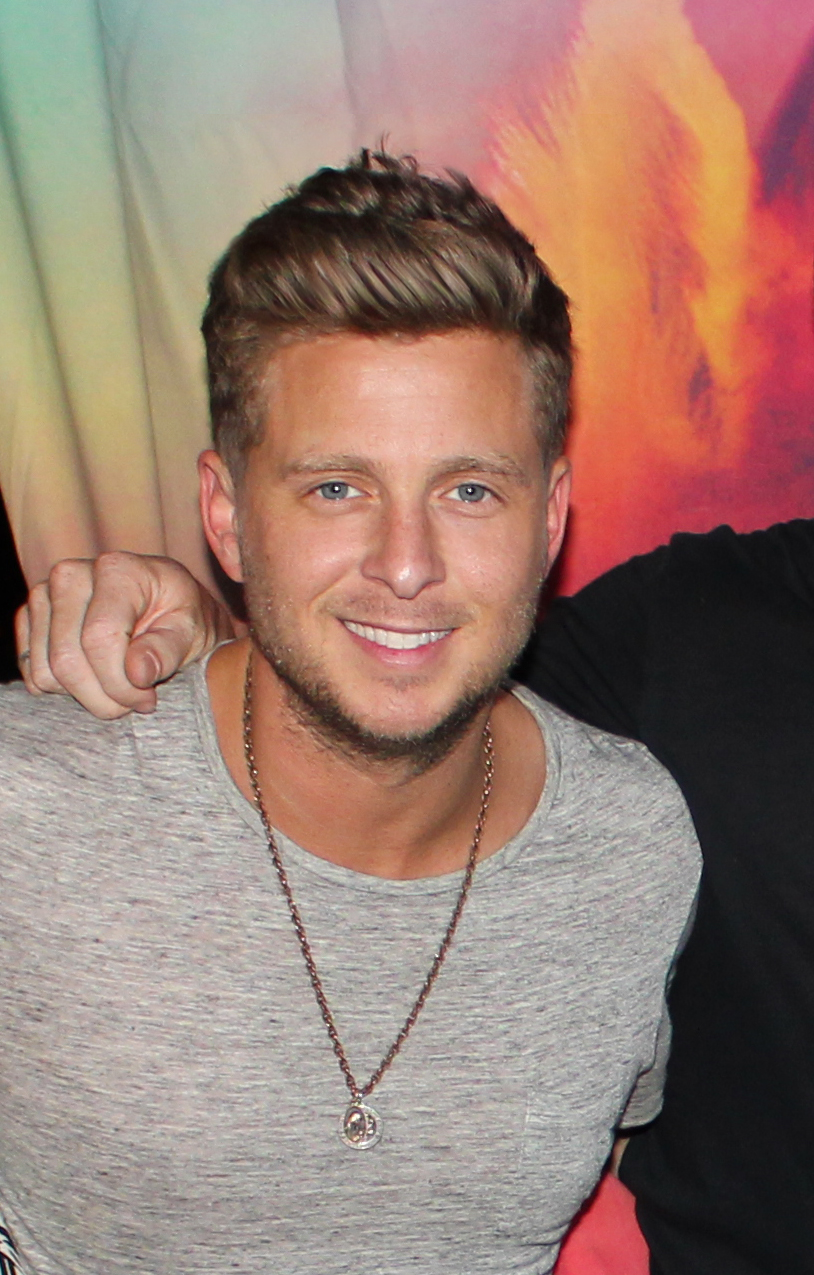
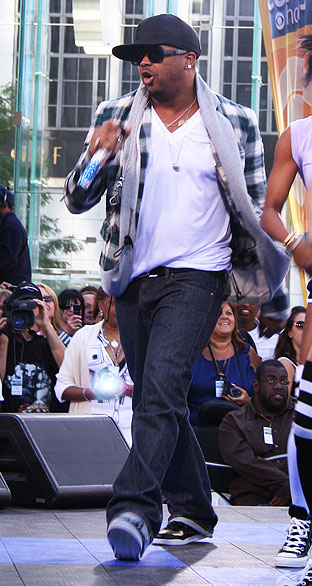
Ryan Tedder (left) served as writer of "XO" and composed and produced along with Terius "The-Dream" Nash (right) and Beyoncé.

"XO" was written by Beyoncé, Terius "The-Dream" Nash and Ryan Tedder while the production was helmed by the aforementioned group as well as Chauncey "Hit-Boy" Hollis and HazeBanga. Ramon Rivas engineered the song, with assistance from Justin Hergett. Beyoncé's vocals were recorded by Stuart White and Bart Schoudel while all instrumentation and programming was carried out by Tedder. The song was finally mixed by Andrew Scheps. "XO" was recorded in four studios: Jungle City Studios and Oven Studios, both in New York City, Trackdown Studios in Sydney and Tritonus Studios in Berlin.

During an interview with Australian radio station Nova in November 2013, Tedder revealed that he had collaborated with Beyoncé on a song for her then-upcoming album along with The-Dream, further saying, "Personally the song we did I like more than 'Halo'. I think it's a bigger, better song". However, he acknowledged that he did not know when the singer planned to release new material for her fifth album. The previous month, it was reported by a source to the Daily News that Beyoncé planned to release a new single and video on December 3, 2013. The publication further speculated that the single was expected to be the song whose music video was filmed in August of the same year – "XO". Later, when Beyoncé was released, Billboard reported that "Blow" would be released as the contemporary hit radio single both in the US and worldwide, and "Drunk in Love" would be sent to urban radio in the US only; "XO" was scheduled to be released as the second worldwide radio single in 2014. However, radio programmers reportedly pushed back against the release of "Blow" to mainstream stations, finding its lyrics to be very explicit for the format and proposing that "XO" be released in its place. The release of "Blow" was therefore scrapped and "XO" impacted contemporary hit radio in Italy and adult contemporary radio in the US on December 16, 2013. It was also sent to US mainstream, urban and rhythmic radio on December 17. A digital single, with "Drunk in Love" as a double A-side, was released to streaming services such as Spotify, where the full Beyoncé album was not yet available to stream.

== Composition ==
"XO" is a midtempo pop and electro-rock love power ballad that strongly resembles Beyoncé's own 2008 song "Halo", also produced by Tedder, and contains influences of the electronic rock and reggaeton genres. The sheet music for "XO" was published in common time in the key of C major, with a tempo of 85 beats per minute. It carries a "celebratory, bumping Caribbean" groove and a marching-drum beat with shuffling dancehall influences. The instrumentation includes jittery keyboards, synthesizers, percussion and electronic musical instruments. The song also consists of electronic flourishes and looped riff patterns brought about by an organ instrument. "XO" was also noted for departing from the album's minimalistic sexual nature, due to its pure pop sound. Jordan Sargent of Complex magazine wrote that "XO" contains influences of Jamaican singer Tanya Stephens. Chris Bosman from Consequence of Sound described the song as a blend of "cinematic reach of modern Top 40 pop with the patience and melancholy of post-808s & Heartbreaks [sic] hip-hop." Kevin Fallon from The Daily Beast compared the song's stadium sound to tracks by the band U2.

"XO"
Beyoncé uses "subtly exhausted" vocals and the croakiness in her soulful voice complements the uplifting chorus lines, "Baby love me, lights out", as noted by music critics. The song gives the impression to have been recorded in a stadium full of fans due to its celebratory groove and call and response chorus lines.

Beyoncé's vocals in the song span from the note of A_{3} to the note of C_{5}. When asked about her raw vocals in the song previously unheard on her material and the song's less polished sound, Beyoncé revealed that "XO" was recorded when she had a bad sinus infection and that it was recorded as a demo in several minutes. The original demo vocals were kept for a year without being re-recorded as the singer "really loved the imperfections" and wanted to focus on the album's music instead of the vocals.

The lyrics of "XO" cheerfully celebrate love and life as Beyoncé attempts "to create light from darkness". It has been described as a universal love song which describes different types of relationships. The singer emphasizes how important living in the present with a person's loved one is as life is unpredictable, as well as how both tragic and magnificent life can be. Throughout the song, the singer adopts a hopeful attitude and seems to have gone in trance with love, a state further augmented by her usage of a generally low register. Caitlin White from the website The 405 interpreted the song's lyrics in depth:

In the darkest night of hate and intolerance we see impossible love stories conquering what our governments and societies declare is legally 'allowed' to be love... It is for love that transcends the romantic conception of man and woman and stretches out into the impossibilities of the cosmos. It leaves room for failure but hopes for success.

The opening lines of "XO" are echo-laden and unlike other songs on Beyoncé, the ballad contains several hooks. Beyoncé starts the song by asking a loved one to kiss her. Some of the ascending chorus lines are call and response; backed by a sing-along crowd, Beyoncé sings about how her lover's face enlightens her "darkest nights": "In the darkest night hour / I search through the crowd / Your face is all that I see / I give you everything". The chorus ends with her adding, "Baby love me, lights out", with a croak in her voice.

== Sampling controversy ==
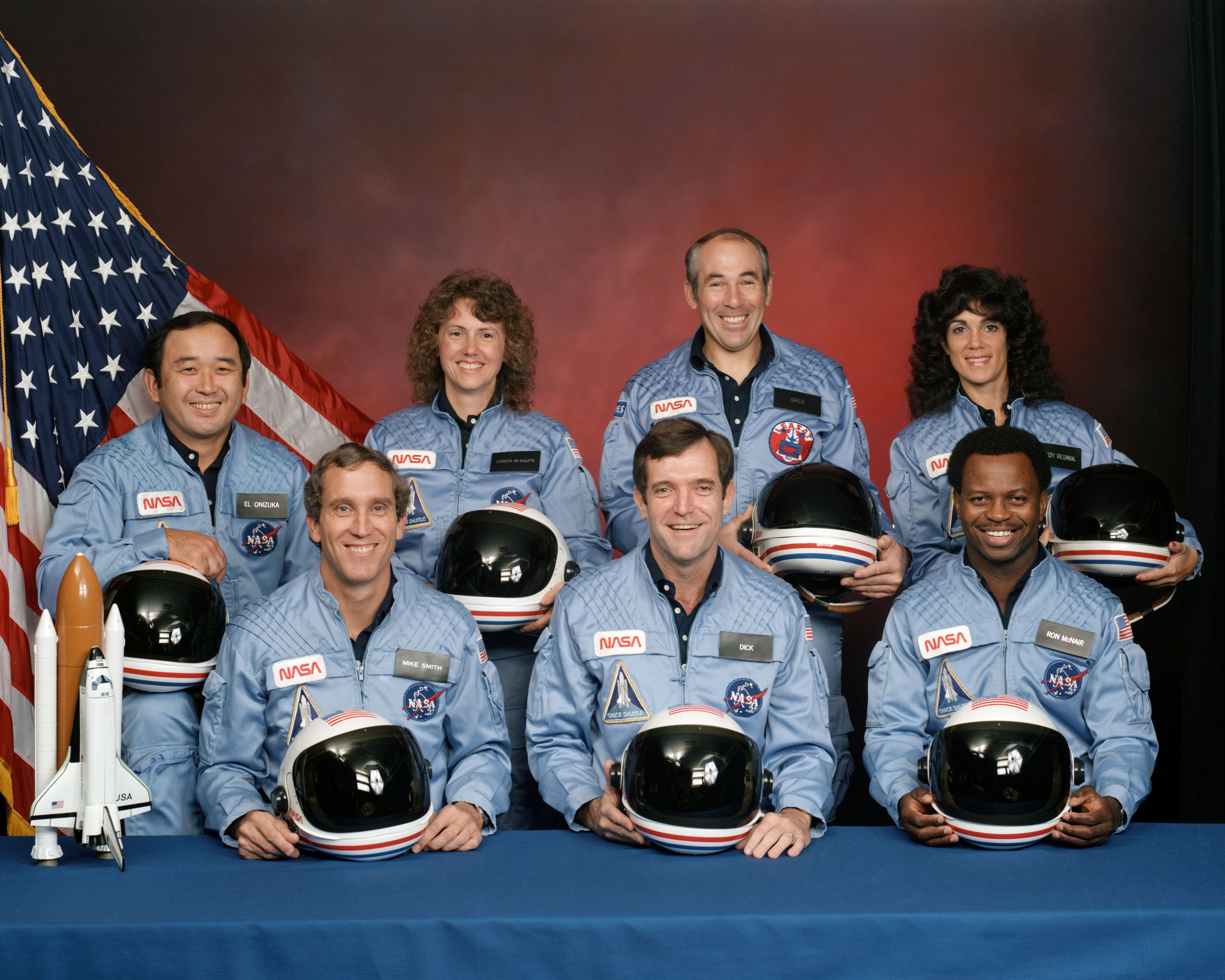
STS-51-L crew who died during the Space Shuttle Challenger disaster.

The song begins with a six second-long sample of former NASA public affairs officer Steve Nesbitt, recorded moments after Space Shuttle Challenger disaster on January 28, 1986: "Flight controllers here looking very carefully at the situation. Obviously a major malfunction." The use of the sample has been criticized in the media, including Hardeep Phull of the New York Post, who described its presence in the song as "tasteless". Former NASA astronauts and families were also dismayed and labeled the use of the sample as "insensitive". Keith Cowing of NASA Watch suggested that the use of the clip ranged from negligence to repugnance.

On December 30, 2013, NASA criticized the use of the sample, stating: "The Challenger accident is an important part of our history; a tragic reminder that space exploration is risky and should never be trivialized. NASA works every day to honor the legacy of our fallen astronauts as we carry out our mission to reach for new heights and explore the universe." Earlier on the same date, Beyoncé had issued a statement to ABC News in response to the families, explaining why she and her co-songwriters decided to include the audio sample in "XO":

My heart goes out to the families of those lost in the Challenger disaster. The song 'XO' was recorded with the sincerest intention to help heal those who have lost loved ones and to remind us that unexpected things happen, so love and appreciate every minute that you have with those who mean the most to you. The songwriters included the audio in tribute to the unselfish work of the Challenger crew with hope that they will never be forgotten.

Forrest Wickman of Slate magazine defended Beyoncé's choice to use the sample, and criticized the media reports for their "dismissive" interpretation of the song's "vague" lyrics as being about "a girl in a relationship". According to Wickman, the lyrics of the song refer to mortality and "the urgency of spending time with the ones you love before you lose them, because you never know when that could be"; this is shown in the hook lines, "Baby kiss me / Before they turn the lights out / You better kiss me / Before our time has run out." A similar interpretation was voiced by Douglas Wolk of Wired, who challenged the notion of the sample being simply a "trivialization", instead describing it as "a swift, understated and brutal reminder that everything can go horribly wrong before anyone understands what's happening, and that the light could be extinguished at any moment". Wickman concluded, "If there's anything anyone should know by now about Beyoncé Knowles, it's that there's nothing in her self-presentation that isn't carefully chosen."

Caitlin White from the website The 405 noted that there was a reason for the song being "couched in warnings" of malfunction and tragedy elaborating, "As far controversy, denying Beyonce the ability to embrace the intertextuality of incorporating a historical recording like the Challenger explosion is an attempt to relegate her art to a lower form of political discourse, one that's not 'worthy' of interacting with an event of cultural significance like this. But this is not just a 'pop album,' it's a woman holding forth on the role of women in our society, how they should approach the nuances of their life and most importantly, how they can choose to value relationships... That isn't just the work of a diva, that is the work of a political figure."

== Critical reception ==
"XO" received generally positive reviews from music critics. Vanity Fair writer Michelle Collins described it as "the most upbeat and catchiest song of the lot" on the album. Ryan Dennehy from the website AbsolutePunk opined that "XO" was a guaranteed, triumphant hit. Andrew Hampp and Erika Ramirez of Billboard magazine described "XO" as "magical" further calling it the most radio-friendly song on the entire album with its traditional pop structure. Peter Tabakis from the website Pretty Much Amazing listed the "magnificent power ballad" as one of the "potential chart-toppers" of the album. Michael Cragg of The Guardian called the track a "joyous, echo-laden heart burst," and an immediate choice for a single. Stereogum's Tom Breihan found "an immediately apparent hit [in Beyoncé is]... the incandescent 'XO'". Rob Harvilla from Spin found "monster-single potential" in "XO". Marc Hogan of the same publication described the song as a potential radio hit "that looms largest" from the album. He further went on to praise its "grandly swaying hook that makes the one from Jessie Ware's 'Wildest Moments' sound understated". Lindsay Zoladz of Pitchfork Media praised the song's "big, boundary-obliterating" pop appeal and hailed it as a future blockbuster and hit. She went on to praise the singer's vocal performance in the song concluding "all of the flawlessness here is brilliantly undercut by that gravelly croak".

The song's pop and sing-along sound and production received praise by critics. Greg Kot from the Chicago Tribune described the song's production as "predictable" and opined that the audience sing-along chorus sounded like it was created specifically for being performed during an arena encore. Similarly, Nathan S. of the website DJ Booth wrote that the song was suitable for "ecstatic" fans to sing along without efforts during a stadium concert: "This is the kind of chorus that's going to be sung at full force in traffic jams for months to come, and while XO may be relatively more subdued, that call and response is destined to be a monster when performed live, right down to the way her voice shows a little wear, just like it would at the end of a show." Jody Rosen writing for Vulture found a "cavernous widescreen" anthemic pop sound in the song further saying that its chorus sounded like it was specifically made for an Olympics opening ceremony. Carrie Battan of Pitchfork described the song as a "stadium-filling" one and classified it as one of Beyoncé's "decorous moments". Joe Lynch from Fuse described "XO" as the "most uplifting" pop song since Florence and the Machine's "Shake It Out" (2011). He praised the electronic flourishes, saying that they managed to "keep the music from veering into banal territory" and concluded that the song has a "quirky" sound previously unheard on other material by Beyoncé. Philip Sherburne of Spin found "zero-G bounce... which, purely in terms of sonics, makes the most compelling argument for space tourism I have yet to come across".

Many critics considered "XO" to be a highlight on the album. Drowned in Sound's Robert Leedham opined in his review of the album, "Most glorious of all is 'XO', a supermassive, dumbstruck ode to being in love and caring about fuck all else. It's the one album track that's linear enough to withstand a drunken singalong." Lavanya Ramanthatan of The Washington Post described the song as a "swelling anthem" and one of the highlights of Beyoncé. Caitlin White from the website The 405, hailed "XO" as "the album's crowning track... [it] feels like even more of a triumph". Philip Cosores from Paste magazine noted that the song, along with several others in the closing portion of the album, was "probably the best of her career". Jordan Sargent from Complex magazine described "XO" as the "purest love song" on Beyoncé. However, a more mixed review came from Claire Lobenfeld of the same publication who felt that it was the only skippable track of the album due to its "mawkish" feel. Similarly, Chris Kelly of Fact magazine wrote that the song "reeks of Ryan Tedder's paint-by-number hitmaking".

=== Recognition and accolades ===
Under the Radar's Ryan E.C. Hamm argued that "XO" made "a strong case" for being included as song of the year on several year-end lists; however he noted that this was not possible as the lists had already been compiled and published when the song was released. However, Rob Sheffield of Rolling Stone placed "XO" at number 8 in his year-end list of the 25 best songs of 2013. The song was further ranked at number 72 in the annual Pazz and Jop mass critics poll of the year's best in music. In 2014, Vulture's writer Jody Rosen listed the song at number 52 on his list of "The 150 Greatest Schlock Songs Ever" calling it "an instant classic": "The grand, sparkly production screams 2013; the theme — how love bears out to the edge of doom and all that — is timeless." The same year, he further included the song in his list of the best songs by Beyoncé published in The New York Times. In 2019, Pitchfork listed XO at number 182 on their greatest songs of the decade (2010s) list. "XO" is nominated in the category for Best Song at the 2014 World Music Awards.

=== Usage in media ===
Toyota featured the song, along with Beyoncé, in their 2014 commercial as part of the "Get Going" campaign.

In 2018, Louis Vuitton featured the song in the company's first fragrance film starring Emma Stone.

The TV series The Summer I Turned Pretty, featured the song in the eighth episode of its second season, during Isabel “Belly” Conklin and Jeremiah Fisher’s kiss.

== Chart performance ==
"XO" debuted at number 66 on the US Billboard Hot 100 for the week ending January 4, 2014. The song gradually ascended the chart and in its fifth week, on the chart issue dated February 1, 2014, it peaked at number 45. It spent five additional weeks on the Billboard Hot 100, being placed at number 83 in its last week before falling out of the chart. On the Mainstream Top 40 airplay chart it debuted at number 32 for the week ending January 11, 2014. The next week, "XO" moved to number 24 on that chart and it eventually peaked at number 18 spending a total of eight weeks on the Mainstream Top 40. On the US Hot R&B/Hip-Hop Songs chart, the single reached number 12 in its total of eighteen weeks spent on the chart. As of June 6, 2014, "XO" has sold 356,000 downloads in the US. In Canada, "XO" has peaked at number 36 on the Canadian Hot 100 chart and was certified gold by Music Canada for sales of 40,000 copies in that country.

In the UK, "XO" debuted at number 23 on the UK R&B Chart on December 28, 2013 and number 84 on the UK Singles Chart on January 11, 2014. Following Beyoncé's performance of "XO" at the 2014 BRIT Awards in February 2014, sales of the song in the country increased by 96% within the first two hours, and were up by 252% the following day. Following the performance, the song moved ten positions up on the UK R&B Chart at number 5 the next week, and on March 8, 2014 it moved to a peak position of 4. It also peaked at number 22 on the singles chart on the same date and spent 13 weeks in total. On October 17, 2014, the British Phonographic Industry (BPI) certified it silver for sales of 200,000 copies. On the Irish Singles Chart, "XO" debuted at 70 for the week ending December 26, 2013. It set a peak of 15 on the chart for the week ending January 30, 2014 and further remained on the chart until April 3.

For the week ending December 21, 2013, "XO" debuted at number five on the South Korea Gaon International Chart with digital sales of 13,731 copies and later peaked at number four. For the week of December 30, 2013, "XO" debuted at number 44 on the Australian Singles Chart and number 5 on the Australian Urban Singles Chart. On January 26, 2014, it set a peak of number 16 on the singles chart and was certified gold by the Australian Recording Industry Association (ARIA) for shipment of 35,000 copies. On the New Zealand Singles Chart, "XO" debuted at number at number 38 on January 6, 2014 and it moved to 19 the following week. It peaked at number 10 on the chart issue dated January 20, 2014 and gradually descended the chart before falling off on March 17, 2014 after last being seen at 33.

== Music video ==
=== Background ===
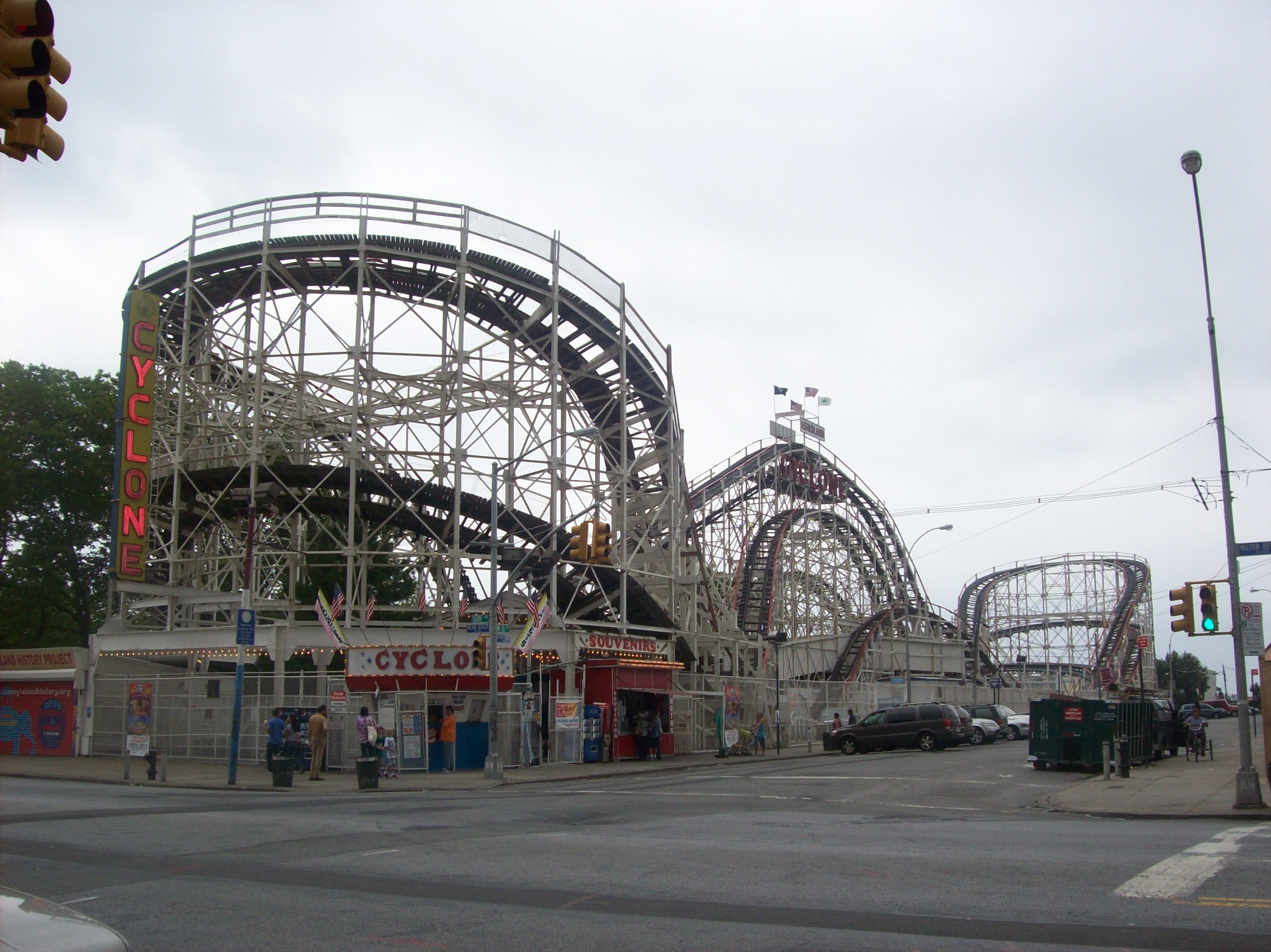
The Coney Island Cyclone served as the filming location for the music video

The music video for "XO" was directed by Terry Richardson. It was filmed on August 29, 2013 on Coney Island's Cyclone roller coaster. On that same day, Beyoncé was spotted at that location. It was later confirmed by several publications that Beyoncé was filming a video for a then-upcoming song titled "XO" from her upcoming fifth album. The Daily Telegraph further reported that fashion models Jourdan Dunn, Jessica White and Diandra Forrest were present during the filming of the video. Several scenes for the video were also filmed during Beyoncé's concert at the Brazilian festival Rock in Rio at Rio de Janeiro in 2013 where the singer asked the crowd to make X and O shapes with their hands; the hand movement choreography was created by Lee Anne Callahan-Longo, the general manager at Parkwood Entertainment. During a behind-the-scenes video, Richardson described the process for the filming of the clip for "XO",

"You know, it's amazing cause in one point we were like in the arcade and I said to Beyoncé let's just do this. You wanna open the door and you're gonna perform and we're just gonna walk out and see what happens and she was like 'Yeah, let's go for it'. And literally we came out the door and it was like just hundreds of people sort of coming around us. People everywhere, cameras, people yelling her name. It was incredible, I have never experienced anything like that. It was really reportage, loose, not planned, we went with feeling, we went with instinct... It's a beautiful cycle of energy."

Beyoncé further described the filming of the video as "insanely chaotic" before adding that it captured "raw, fun and being in the moment". In order to prevent snippets of the song being leaked online, the singer wore earbuds during the filming of the video instead of playing the music loud and lip synced the lyrics. The music video for "XO" was first released on the iTunes Store on the visual album itself on December 13, 2013, which contained a previously filmed music video for every song. It was later released to Vevo on December 16, 2013 along with the video for "Drunk in Love".

=== Synopsis ===
The video opens with scenes of Beyoncé standing in front of a wall made of flashing multi-coloured light bulbs. Several scenes of people riding bumper cars follow as Beyoncé also goes riding one. She then continues playing carnival games and rides the Cyclone roller coaster with her stylist Ty Hunter while wearing a baseball cap emblazoned with Notorious B.I.G.'s face and white tank top with jeans. Several scenes show Beyoncé walking along the boardwalk, while paparazzi take pictures of her; during one scene a TMZ cameraman Adam Glyn makes a cameo appearance. Several other scenes show the singer dancing with fans and street performers while sporting a light bow on her head. Beyoncé also dances a choreographed dance with several female background dancers on a skee ball game. Scenes of love couples and instances of various iconic establishments are also featured throughout. Footage of Beyoncé leading a crowd for the choreography at a concert is also featured as well as the singer appearing with a bat made of money.

=== Reception ===
A writer of Rap-Up magazine wrote Beyoncé was "spread[ing] the love" with the "feel-good clip". Idolator's Mike Wass said "Happily [it] is as gorgeous as the song with Terry Richardson simply filming Bey living it up at Coney Island. It's almost too perfect." In another review, he also hailed it as "carefree, neon-drenched" and one of the best clips on the whole album adding that it looked more like a home movie than a music video which was "part of its immense appeal". Rob Harvilla from Spin magazine described it as "the sweetest" video on the album. Chris Martins from the same publication wrote that the video is "all pretty huge and heartwarming". Neil McCormick from The Daily Telegraph found "happy innocence" in the clip. Kory Grow from Rolling Stone noted that the clip was a "fun video for a likewise song" further saying that the hand choreography was Beyoncé's version of a similar dance from the song "Y.M.C.A." (1978) by Village People.

Lindsay Zoladz from Pitchfork praised the appeal of the hand-movement choreography from the video, predicting "There will be a supercut of people all over the world lip-syncing and doing cute hand motions to 'XO'". Rachel Brodsky of MTV described the video as charmingly DIY-styled and praised Beyoncé's look and the dance choreography. Hardeep Phull from the New York Post commented that the video "captures the spirit of the song in a way that's sweet if not exactly original". Malene Arpe from Toronto Star described the video as a "happy-party-at-the-fair romp". Jordan Sargent of Complex magazine wrote in his review of the video that it recalls and showcases "the joyous adrenaline rush" of falling in love. He described the tone as "appropriate" and different from the rest of the videos on the album and noted that its director used pink and blue colors in the scenes to capture the feel of "budding romance". Tyler Hanan from the website Under the Gun Review wrote that the video has "all lights on blast and all ages included" and added that it was complete with "smiles, joy, and good-natured silliness".

Melinda Newman from the website HitFix described Beyoncé's look in the video as "sultry, slightly euphoric" and noted its main theme being about comparing love to a carnival. She concluded that the video for "XO" is "interesting... almost as if we're seeing her in some state of heightened reality enhanced by some mood-altering substance-- or maybe that's just what love does to Beyoncé." Joe Lynch from Fuse commented that the shots of Beyoncé's smiles, children dancing and roller coaster throughout the video made it "the most joyous music video of 2013". The same writer in another review said that the video shows Beyoncé "at her most flippant, casual best". Michelle Collins from the Vanity Fair described the singer's look as "young, carefree" further describing the video as "FOMO to the max". However, Whitney Phaneuf of the website HitFix gave a mixed review, comparing the video to Mariah Carey's "Fantasy" (1995) saying that the latter's clip made "the roller coaster look better". The video was nominated in the category for Best Video at the 2014 World Music Awards.

== Live performances ==
Beyoncé performed "XO" live for the first time on December 13, 2013, during a concert in Chicago as part of her The Mrs. Carter Show World Tour. Prior to the performance she revealed that the song was written for her fans and added, "This is the first time, something I'll never forget". She then performed the song as a call and response with the crowd. Molly Wardlaw of Fuse described the performance as "glorious" and a "heavenly thing to behold". Later, Beyoncé also performed the song during the remaining stops of the North American leg of the tour as a part of the encore dedicating it to her fans. While reviewing Beyoncé's performance in Washington, Lavanya Ramanthatan of The Washington Post noted that "XO" was one of the "most thrilling songs" of the concert. Stacey Anderson from Rolling Stone wrote that the song "was delivered with visible emotion, and seemingly with a spontaneity absent from the rest of the precise operation". "XO" was added to the set list and performed live during the second European leg of The Mrs. Carter Show World Tour in 2014 from February to March. Graeme Virtue of The Guardian reviewed the performances of "XO" and "Halo" positively, saying that she managed to transform "[the] monumental songs... into intimate miniatures through sheer force of will" while dancing and interacting with the crowd alone onstage.

The song's first televised performance was at the 2014 BRIT Awards on February 19, 2014, marking her first performance at the ceremony since the one held in 2004. The performance was confirmed by James Corden on BBC Radio 2 several hours prior to the ceremony, following rumours that circulated for several weeks. Beyoncé appeared on stage wearing a shimmering, floor-length sequin blue gown designed by Vrettos Vrettakos containing 140,000 blue zircon crystals and big earrings. The singer performed in front of a simple set of flashing neon lights along with fireworks and lasers on a screen as well as smoke surrounding her dedicating the performance to her fans. Sam Lansky of Time magazine praised the simplicity of the performance as "classy and spare" and wrote that the singer "more than did it justice" with her "pretty much peerless" vocals. MTV News' Emily Blake favorably reviewed the performance as more "subdued" in comparison with the other live shows by Beyoncé. Daily News' Kirthana Ramisetti said that the singer managed to stun at the awards show with the impassioned performance only with the "power of her voice". Vanity Fair writer Josh Duboff described the performance as "powerful and fairly straightforward, sedate even". E! Online's Bruna Nessif wrote that the singer "absolutely stunned as she belted the sweet ballad, giving the audience a memorable show. There was no extra glitz or glamour (not really necessary with a dress like that) or backup dancers and crazy antics. The singer's main focus were her powerhouse vocals". Mark Savage of BBC News opined, "[the] unbilled, stripped-back performance of XO was undoubtedly the night's most flawless vocal". Alexis Petridis of The Guardian described her as "clearly the star of the show". However, Mark Sutherland of the Rolling Stone gave a mixed review about the performance saying it was "a bit... dull". At the 2014 MTV Video Music Awards on August 25, Beyoncé performed "XO" live during a medley consisting of songs from her self-titled album. She performed the song dressed in a bejeweled bodysuit and dedicated it to her fans as the closing track of her performance, stating "This one is for my incredible fans. If it wasn't for you, I wouldn't be on this stage". Nadeska Alexis from MTV News felt that the singer kept the audience "lifted" with the performance of the song.

Beyoncé also performed the song along with "Halo" during the memorial service for Kobe Bryant on February 24, 2020. "XO" is reported to be Kobe's favorite song from Beyoncé.

== Credits and personnel ==
Credits adapted from the liner notes of Beyoncé.

Song credits

- Beyoncé Knowles – songwriting, lead vocals, music production, vocal production
- Terius Nash – songwriting, music production, additional piano, background vocals
- Ryan Tedder – songwriting, lyrics, music production, recording, other instruments, music programming, background vocals
- Hit-Boy – additional music production
- HazeBanga Music – additional music production
- Stuart White – recording
- Bart Schoudel – recording
- Ramon Rivas – engineering
- Justin Hergett – assistant engineering
- Andrew Scheps – mixing
- Tom Coyne – mastering
- Aya Merrill – mastering

Video credits

- Featuring – Jourdan Dunn, Jessica White
- Director – Terry Richardson
- Creative director – Todd Tourso
- Director of photography – Starr Whitesides
- Executive producer – Coleen Haynes
- Producer – Arrow Kruse
- Producer – Adam Baxter
- Production company – Black Dog Films
- Choreography – Lee Anne Callahan-Longo, Kwasi Fordjour, Sam Greenberg
- Stylist – Lysa Cooper
- Additional styling – TY Hunter, Raquel Smith
- Editor – Holle Singer for Consulate LTD.
- Brand manager – Melissa Vargas
- Hair – Neal Farinah
- Make-up – Francesca Tolot
- Nails – Lisa Logan
- Color correction – Light Iron
- Visual effects – Kroma
- Photography – Mason Poole

== Charts ==
=== Weekly charts ===
Weekly chart performance
Chart (2013–2014)	Peak position
Australia (ARIA)	16
Australia Urban (ARIA)	4
Belgium (Ultratip Flanders)	3
Belgium (Ultratop Flanders Urban)	18
Belgium (Ultratip Wallonia)	5
Brazil (Billboard Brasil Hot 100)	69
Canada (Canada CHR/Top 40)	21
Canada Hot 100 (Billboard)	36
Canada (Canada Hot AC)	22
Denmark Airplay (Tracklisten)	8
Europe (Euro Digital Songs)	20
Finland Airplay (Radiosoittolista)	35
France (SNEP)	99
Germany (GfK)	68
Hungary (Stream Top 40)	10
Iceland (RÚV)	19
Ireland (IRMA)	15
Italy (FIMI)	70
Japan (Billboard Japan Hot 100)	15
Mexico (Billboard Ingles Airplay)	14
Netherlands (Dutch Top 40)	24
Netherlands (Single Top 100)	37
New Zealand (Recorded Music NZ)	10
Scottish Singles Sales (Official Charts)	17
Slovenia (SloTop50)	27
South Africa Airplay (EMA)	5
South Korea International Singles (Gaon)	4
Spain (Promusicae)	35
Sweden (Sverigetopplistan)	50
UK Hip Hop/R&B (Official Charts)	4
UK Singles (Official Charts)	22
US Billboard Hot 100	45
US Hot R&B/Hip-Hop Songs (Billboard)	12
US Pop Airplay (Billboard)	18
US Rhythmic Airplay (Billboard)	28

=== Year-end charts ===
Annual chart rankings
Chart (2014)	Peak position
Australia Urban (ARIA)	19
Belgium (Ultratop Flanders Urban)	51
Japan Adult Contemporary (Billboard)	61
US Hot R&B/Hip-Hop Songs (Billboard)	60

== Certifications ==
Certifications for "XO"
Region	Certification	Certified units/sales
Australia (ARIA)	2× Platinum	140,000^{‡}
Canada (Music Canada)	Platinum	80,000^{‡}
New Zealand (RMNZ)	Platinum	15,000^{*}
United Kingdom (BPI)	Platinum	600,000^{‡}
United States (RIAA)	2× Platinum	2,000,000^{‡}
^{*} Sales figures based on certification alone.^{‡} Sales+streaming figures based on certification alone.

== Release history ==
Release dates for "XO"
Country	Date	Format	Label
France	December 16, 2013	Radio airplay	Sony Music Entertainment
Italy	December 16, 2013	Radio airplay	Sony Music Entertainment
United States	December 16, 2013	Hot adult contemporary radio	Parkwood Entertainment • Columbia Records
United States	December 17, 2013	Contemporary hit radio	Parkwood Entertainment • Columbia Records
United States	December 17, 2013	Urban contemporary radio	Parkwood Entertainment • Columbia Records
United States	December 17, 2013	Rhythmic contemporary radio	Parkwood Entertainment • Columbia Records

== John Mayer version ==
"XO"

Single by John Mayer
- Released: May 27, 2014
- Genre: Pop
- Length: 3:36
- Label: Columbia Records
- Composers: Ryan Tedder; Terius Nash; Beyoncé Knowles
- Lyricist: Ryan Tedder
- Producer: John Mayer

John Mayer singles chronology
"Who You Love" (2013)	"XO" (2014)	"Love on the Weekend" (2016)

On April 15, 2014, John Mayer covered "XO" during a concert in Adelaide, Australia. Three days prior to the performance, he used his Twitter account to praise the song, writing, "The best thing about Beyoncé? The break in her voice on the first 'baby, love me lights out' in XO. Real and raw." One month later, on May 22, he released a studio version of the song on his SoundCloud account. It was made available for digital download by Columbia Records on May 27, 2014 through the iTunes Store.

Mayer's version is an acoustic stripped-down rendition complete with guitar and accentuated by piano and harmonica. Kelcey Shipley from MTV News praised his version for its "simplicity" while Killian Young of Rolling Stone shortly described it as "sweet". Spin's Marc Hogan noted that "XO" was a "perfect song for him" and described it as "a person-to-person romantic exchange, transferred over to acoustic instruments but no less stadium-sized – or pop – for it." Lauren Nostro writing for Complex deemed Mayer's live rendition of the song "impressive" before adding that the harmonica, "will tug at your heart strings almost as much as the original song".

For the week ending June 1, 2014, Mayer's version debuted at number 90 on the US Billboard Hot 100 chart and number 13 on the US Hot Rock Songs chart, selling 46,000 copies. On the Canadian Hot 100, "XO" peaked at a position of 76. The single also debuted and peaked at number 81 on the Australian Singles Chart on June 7, 2014. On June 28, 2014, "XO" peaked at number 95 on the Dutch Singles Chart and it fell off the following week. In the UK, it peaked at 115 on the UK Singles Chart on June 7, 2014.

=== Charts ===
Chart (2014)	Peak position
Australia (ARIA)	81
Canada Hot 100 (Billboard)	76
Netherlands (Single Top 100)	95
UK Singles (Official Charts Company)	115
US Billboard Hot 100	90
US Hot Rock Songs (Billboard)	13

=== Certifications ===
Certifications for Xo
Region	Certification	Certified units/sales
Australia (ARIA)	Platinum	70,000^{‡}
Denmark (IFPI Danmark)	Platinum	90,000^{‡}
New Zealand (RMNZ)	Platinum	30,000^{‡}
United States (RIAA)	Gold	500,000^{‡}
^{‡} Sales+streaming figures based on certification alone.

== Cover versions ==
The song was covered for the first time by the American band Haim on February 24, 2014 during a Live Lounge at BBC Radio 1. Their cover version featured vocals by Este Haim and was musically similar to the original version complete with a slow beat, synthesizer flourishes, guitar rift, drum-kick and callback harmonies during the song's chorus. The rendition was noted for containing elements of vintage soft rock and its stripped-down sound was praised highlighting the melody and lyricism of the original "with sincerity" as stated by Whitney Phanuef from HitFix. Billboard writer Jason Lipshutz described their rendition as a "highly unique presentation". Time magazine's Melisa Locker described the cover as "stellar" and "unsurprisingly awesome". Stereogum's Chris DeVille hailed it as a "reverent take" noting that the band managed to "capture the grandeur" of the original by using less musical layers. Slate's Aisha Harris commented that the vocals featured in the cover were not "quite so flawless" as in the original version but praised their version for being pleasant to listen to. Later, the song was added to the band's set list as part of the encore during their tour in 2014. They also performed it at the 2014 Glastonbury Festival with a writer from The Daily Telegraph describing their cover as "reflective".

On April 8, 2014, remix versions of "XO" and "Blow" by French musician Monsieur Adi premiered on Out's official website along Beyoncé's appearance on the cover of the magazine. The remix for "XO" was influenced by electro house music and it was noted for being transformed as a "club-friendly power pop ballad" by the editors of the magazine. Complex magazine writer Lauren Nostro described the version as "fantastic".

On July 1, 2016, Anna Elizabeth Laube released a folk version as a single. It was then released as a part of her album, Tree, on September 9, 2016. No Depression writer Alan Harrison described the track as being "...worthy of Joni Mitchell circa Blue."
