= 4:44 =

Studio album by Jay-Z
- Released: June 30, 2017
- Recorded: December 2016 – June 2017
- Studios: No I.D.'s studio (Hollywood, California)
- Genres: Hip-hop; conscious hip-hop; East Coast hip-hop
- Length: 36:11; 46:16 (with bonus tracks)
- Labels: Roc Nation; UMG
- Producers: No I.D.; Dominic Maker; James Blake

Jay-Z chronology
Magna Carta Holy Grail (2013)	4:44 (2017)	Everything Is Love (2018)

Singles from 4:44
- 1. "4:44" Released: July 11, 2017; 2. "Bam" Released: September 26, 2017

4:44 is the thirteenth studio album by American rapper Jay-Z, released on June 30, 2017, through Roc Nation as an exclusive to Sprint and Tidal customers. The album was the first in a planned series of music exclusives from the Sprint–Tidal partnership, which never came to fruition due to Sprint's demise in 2020. On July 2, the album was made available for free digital download on Tidal's site for a limited time. A physical edition was released on July 7, including three additional tracks. On the same day, the album was made available to other streaming platforms, such as Apple Music, Google Play Music and Amazon Music.

Like Jay-Z's previous album, Magna Carta Holy Grail (2013), 4:44 was not preceded by any singles. The album was recorded from December 2016 to June 2017, and produced by No I.D., with additional contributions by Jay-Z himself. James Blake and Dominic Maker also contributed production to the album's bonus tracks. It features guest appearances from Frank Ocean, Damian Marley, Jay-Z's wife Beyoncé, and his mother, Gloria Carter. It also has additional vocal contributions from his daughter Blue Ivy Carter, James Fauntleroy, Kim Burrell and The-Dream.

The album was widely acclaimed by critics, who praised its emotional and personal content. It debuted at number one on the US Billboard 200 with 262,000 album-equivalent units in its first week, making it Jay-Z's 14th album to top the chart. The album spawned two singles: "4:44" and "Bam", as well as several music videos, directed by a variety of high-profile collaborators. On July 5, the album was certified platinum by the Recording Industry Association of America (RIAA), in recognition of one million copies purchased by Sprint and offered to consumers as free downloads. At the 60th Annual Grammy Awards, the album received a Grammy Award nomination for Album of the Year, while the title track was nominated for Song of the Year and "The Story of O.J." was nominated for Record of the Year.

== Background and recording ==
In June 2017, 4:44 posters in New York City, Los Angeles, and Miami, as well as internet banner ads, teased the release of the album. A one-minute teaser ad was aired during the NBA Finals on June 7 featuring actors Mahershala Ali, Lupita Nyong'o, and Danny Glover, ending with "4:44 – 6.30.17, Exclusively on Tidal". On June 18, Father's Day, a clip titled "Adnis" was posted on Sprint's YouTube page. Adnis was Jay-Z's father's name. A second teaser trailer was released on June 27 titled "Kill Jay Z", which featured a young man with a "Stay Black" T-shirt. A third teaser followed on June 28 titled "ManyFacedGod", featuring Lupita Nyong'o crying "hysterically" on the floor.

No I.D. says Jay-Z approached him about working together, and initially declined. He cited feeling "uninspired" and "didn't think [he] had anything at the time". However, he researched Quincy Jones as inspiration to begin work with Jay-Z. No I.D. states he "began to play the samples like I would play an instrument." To get inspiration for 4:44, No I.D. pointed to albums such as What's Going On by Marvin Gaye, Confessions by Usher, The Blueprint by Jay-Z, Illmatic by Nas, and My Beautiful Dark Twisted Fantasy by Kanye West, saying he "analyzed the mistakes and tried not to make those mistakes." The album was largely recorded in No I.D.'s home studio in Hollywood. Its recording began in late December 2016, according to No I.D. It was finished shortly before the album's release. "4:44" was written when Jay-Z woke up one morning at 4:44 am, and recorded at his house using Beyoncé's microphone.

== Composition ==
"4:44"
A 24-second sample of "4:44" that illustrates the soulful production from No I.D. and Jay-Z's rapping about his past regrets and mistakes of infidelity, being common characteristics of the album.

4:44 is a hip-hop and conscious hip-hop album. It contains samples from many genres, like funk, progressive rock, reggae, hip-hop and soul. These include Stevie Wonder's "Love's in Need of Love Today", The Clark Sisters's "Ha Ya (Eternal Life)", Donny Hathaway's "Someday We'll All Be Free", Fugees's "Fu-Gee-La", and Nina Simone's "Four Women" and "Baltimore". While most of the samples span previous decades, the title track to 4:44 is sampled from the 2016 record 'Late Nights and Heartbreaks' from independent British group Hannah Williams and The Affirmations. Complex Networks premiered the official music video to the original record, directed by British Hip-Hop video director Nick Donnelly

Elia Leight of Rolling Stone notes 4:44 is "sample-heavy at a time when so much of rap has moved away from that sound". Jay-Z and No I.D. created a playlist based on Jay-Z's taste, and sampled some songs of it in the album. Later, Jay-Z posted the playlist, titled 4:44 Inspired By, on Tidal.

On the album, Jay-Z touches on a wide array of topics, such as the ongoing hip hop culture, his family life, his relationships, stereotypes and racism. Many critics have noted that 4:44 is a response to Lemonade, with Jay-Z referencing lines from the album. For example, the "You better call Becky with the good hair" line on Beyoncé's "Sorry", with Jay-Z retorting, "Leave me alone, Becky" in "Family Feud". However, No I.D. said that to make the entire album a response to Lemonade was not the intention. Instead, Jay-Z wanted to focus on an album "where I talk about the things that I've never talked about".

"Kill Jay Z" is about "killing" his ego Jay Z (without hyphen), featured in his previous album Magna Carta Holy Grail. The song references his friendship with Kanye West, as well as an incident in which he shot his brother. He also references his rumored extramarital relationships. "The Story of O.J." references racism, stereotypes and the experience of being a black person in America. "Smile" discusses his mother being a lesbian, while featuring a poem from her. "Caught Their Eyes" references Prince; before his death, Prince befriended Jay-Z, giving exclusive streaming rights for his catalog to Tidal. "4:44", the album's title track, is "one long, tearful, soul-ripped-open apology" dedicated to Beyoncé.

"Family Feud" is about a "separation within the culture" and "tensions in the black community and at home". The track also references his infidelity. The "reggae-tinged" song "Bam" features Damian Marley's vocals, with a four-piece horn section and guitar. Jay-Z said about the track: "it's just jammin', it's just like the song. But it's secretly Shawn Carter saying, 'Man, you need a bit of ego.'" "Moonlight" references two films nominated to the 2017 Oscars for Best Picture, Moonlight and La La Land, as a "commentary on the culture and where we're going".

== Release and promotion ==
Jay-Z held listening parties for the album at participating Sprint stores on June 29, 2017. 4:44 was released as an exclusive to Tidal and Sprint subscribers on June 30, the first in a planned series of music exclusives from the Sprint–Tidal partnership. Through an iHeartRadio and Roc Nation partnership, 4:44 was played on a loop on various rap stations until July 1. Jay-Z provided song commentary via iHeartRadio upon the album's release. On July 7, a physical version of the album featuring three additional tracks was released, and the album was made available to other streaming platforms, such as Apple Music, Google Play Music and Amazon Music.

Music videos were released for every song on the album except "Caught Their Eyes". An animated music video for "The Story of O.J." was uploaded on Tidal soon after the album's release. The video was directed by Mark Romanek and Jay-Z and shows a character named Jaybo, based on The Story of Little Black Sambo. This was followed weekly by "4:44" directed by TNEG, "Bam" directed by Rohan Blair-Mangat, "Kill Jay Z" directed by Gerard Bush and Christopher Renz, "Adnis" directed by Romanek, "Moonlight" directed by Alan Yang, and "ManyFacedGod" directed by Francesco Carrozzini. On November 24, three further videos were released: "Legacy" directed by Jeymes Samuel, "Smile" directed by Miles Jay and "Marcy Me" directed by Ben and Joshua Safdie. On December 29, an all-star video for "Family Feud" was released (featuring actors Jessica Chastain, Michael B. Jordan, Janet Mock, and David Oyelowo among many others), directed by Ava DuVernay and scored by Flying Lotus, followed on January 7, 2018, by "Blue's Freestyle", directed by Maurice Taylor of Artlife Studios.

=== Singles ===
The album's title track, "4:44", was released as the lead single to rhythmic contemporary radio on July 11, 2017.

The song "Bam", was released as the second single to rhythmic contemporary radio on September 26, 2017.

=== Tour ===
On July 10, Jay-Z announced the 32-date North American 4:44 Tour beginning on October 27 at the Honda Center in Anaheim, California. The tour concluded on December 21 at The Forum in Inglewood.

== Critical reception ==
Professional ratings
Aggregate scores
Source	Rating
AnyDecentMusic?	7.8/10
Metacritic	82/100
Review scores
Source	Rating
AllMusic	4/5 stars
The A.V. Club	A−
The Daily Telegraph	5/5 stars
The Guardian	3/5 stars
NME	4/5 stars
The Observer	4/5 stars
Pitchfork	8.4/10
Rolling Stone	4/5 stars
The Times	4/5 stars
Vice (Expert Witness)	A−

According to the review aggregator Metacritic, 4:44 received "universal acclaim" based on a weighted average score of 82 out of 100 from 29 critic scores. Many critics praised its emotional and personal content. Neil McCormick of The Daily Telegraph gave the album a perfect score, stating "It's a highly personal work bravely opening up the artist's very human flaws as an example to others, locating in his own suffering a path towards forgiveness, redemption and, ultimately, a better world. There is little braver than admitting your mistakes and trying to change your ways. By embracing vulnerability, Jay Z has taken a step towards genuine wisdom."

Brittany Spanos of Rolling Stone called the album "a stunning, raw and mature apology that's as much an ode to partnership and family as it is an example of how vulnerability can make for truly excellent art." Spanos states "4:44" is "the most specific and touching" song on the album. 4:44 was named "Best New Music" by Pitchfork, with reviewer Sheldon Pearce writing, "The most crafty and evasive MC lays bare his complicated life. This late-career gem is personal and diamond-sharp, confronting the failings and legacy of Shawn Carter and America." He also calls the album a "historical artifact".

Select rankings of 4:44
Publication	List	Rank
The Atlantic	The 10 Best Albums of 2017	10
Esquire	The Best Albums of 2017	3
Exclaim	Exclaim!'s Top 10 Hip-Hop Albums of 2017	3
The Independent	The 30 Best Albums of 2017	15
People	People Picks The 10 Best Albums of 2017	5
Pitchfork	The 50 Best Albums of 2017	13
The Ringer	The Best Albums of 2017	1
Rolling Stone	50 Best Albums of 2017	12
Slant Magazine	The 25 Best Albums of 2017	5
Uproxx	All The Best Albums of 2017	7

== Commercial performance ==
4:44 debuted at number one on the US Billboard 200 with 262,000 album-equivalent units (of which 174,000 copies were pure album sales) in its first week, according to Nielsen Soundscan. This became Jay-Z's 14th number one album. The album was a Tidal exclusive for the first week and the streaming numbers on Tidal were not reported. On July 5, 2017, the album was certified platinum by the Recording Industry Association of America (RIAA) for sales of over a million units. The album was certified only a week after its release. During this period, it was reported that mobile company Sprint, a major share-holder in Tidal, had bought a million copies of 4:44 and provided subscribers free downloads of the album. In its second week, the album remained at number one on the chart, earning an additional 87,000 units. In its third week, the album dropped to number seven on the chart, earning 45,000 more units. In its fourth week, the album climbed to number five on the chart, earning 33,000 units. By the end of 2017, the album had accumulated 639,000 album-equivalent units in the United States, with 399,000 as pure sales, not including the one million copies given away. In 2017, 4:44 was ranked as the 36th most popular album of the year on the Billboard 200.

== Track listing ==
Credits adapted from digital booklet.

4:44 track listing
No.	Title	Writer(s)	Producer(s)	Length
1.	"Kill Jay Z"	Shawn Carter; Dion Wilson; Alan Parsons; Eric Woolfson	No I.D.	2:58
2.	"The Story of O.J."	Carter; Wilson; Nina Simone; Gene Redd; Jimmy Crosby	No I.D.; Jay-Z^{[a]}	3:51
3.	"Smile" (featuring Gloria Carter)	Carter; Wilson; Stevie Wonder	No I.D.; Jay-Z^{[a]}	4:49
4.	"Caught Their Eyes" (featuring Frank Ocean)	Carter; Wilson; Frank Ocean; Randy Newman; Nina Simone; Joseph N. Welch	No I.D.; Jay-Z^{[a]}	3:26
5.	"4:44"	Carter; Wilson; Kanan Keeney	No I.D.	4:44
6.	"Family Feud" (featuring Beyoncé)	Carter; Wilson; Elbernita Clark; Beyoncé Knowles-Carter	No I.D.	4:11
7.	"Bam" (featuring Damian Marley)	Carter; Wilson; Winston Riley; Ophlin Russell; Damian Marley; Jacob Miller; Roger Lewis	No I.D.	3:54
8.	"Moonlight"	Carter; Wilson; Lauryn Hill; Wyclef Jean; Pras Michel; Salaam Gibbs; Mary Brockert; Allen McGrier	No I.D.; Jay-Z^{[a]}	2:23
9.	"Marcy Me"	Carter; Wilson; José Cid; Tozé Brito; Terius Nash	No I.D.	2:54
10.	"Legacy"	Carter; Wilson; Edward Howard; Donny Hathaway	No I.D.; Jay-Z^{[a]}	2:57
11.	"Adnis" (bonus track)	Carter; James Blake; Wilson	Blake; No I.D.^{[b]}	2:26
12.	"Blue's Freestyle / We Family" (featuring Blue Ivy Carter; bonus track)	Carter; Wilson; Sonia Bazanta; Ron Gilmore Jr.	No I.D.; Jay-Z^{[a]}	4:23
13.	"ManyFacedGod" (featuring James Blake; bonus track)	Carter; Wilson; Blake; Dominic Maker; Sylvia Robinson; Michael Burton; Dwight T. Ross; Jerry Peters; Anita Poree; Beyoncé; Justin Timberlake; Terius Nash; Timothy Mosley; Mike Dean; Jerome Harmon; Dwane Weir	Blake; Maker; No I.D.^{[b]}	3:18
Total length:				46:16

=== Notes ===
- ^{^[a]} signifies a co-producer
- ^{^[b]} signifies an additional producer
- "4:44" features background vocals by Kim Burrell
- "Family Feud" originally didn't feature credited vocals by Beyoncé
- "Marcy Me" features additional vocals by The-Dream
- "Legacy" features intro vocals by Blue Ivy Carter and background vocals by James Fauntleroy
- "ManyFacedGod" is stylized as "MaNyfaCedGod"

=== Sample credits ===
- "Kill Jay Z" contains a sample and portions from "Don't Let It Show", written by Alan Parsons and Eric Woolfson, and performed by The Alan Parsons Project.
- "The Story of O.J." contains elements and excerpts from "Four Women", written and performed by Nina Simone; elements from "Kool is Back", as performed by Funk, Inc.; and excerpts from "Kool Back Again", written by Gene Redd and Jimmy Crosby, and performed by Kool & the Gang.
- "Smile" contains elements and excerpts from "Love's in Need of Love Today", written and performed by Stevie Wonder.
- "Caught Their Eyes" contains a sample and excerpts from "Baltimore", written by Randy Newman, and performed by Nina Simone; and an excerpt from the Army–McCarthy hearings.
- "4:44" contains samples of "Late Nights and Heartbreak", written by Kanan Keeney, and performed by Hannah Williams and The Affirmations; and an interpolation of "(At Your Best) You Are Love" written by Ernie Isley, Marvin Isley, Chris Jasper, Rudolph Isley, O'Kelly Isley, Jr. and Ronald Isley, and performed by The Isley Brothers.
- "Family Feud" contains portions of "Ha Ya (Eternal Life)", written by Elbernita Clark, and performed by The Clark Sisters.
- "Bam" contains elements from "Bam Bam", written by Winston Riley and Ophlin Russell, and performed by Sister Nancy; and elements from "Tenement Yard", written by Roger Lewis, and performed by Jacob Miller. R. Henry Gordon, N. N. McCarthy and Frederick "Toots" Hibbert hold the copyright to the original version of the song "Bam Bam" (of which the Sister Nancy version is a cover). The original songwriters were not credited or issued royalties for use of the song by Sister Nancy or Jay-Z.
- "Moonlight" contains a sample of "Fu-Gee-La", as performed by The Fugees.
- "Marcy Me" contains elements from "Todo o Mundo e Ninguém", written by José Cid and Tozé Brito, and performed by Quarteto 1111; and an interpolation of "Unbelievable", as performed by The Notorious B.I.G., from the album Ready to Die.
- "Legacy" contains a sample and excerpts from the recording "Someday We'll All Be Free", written by Edward Howard, and performed by Donny Hathaway; and an interpolation of "Glaciers of Ice", written by Corey Woods, Dennis Coles, Robert Diggs, and Elgin Turner, and performed by Raekwon.
- "Blue's Freestyle / We Family" contains elements and portions of "La Verdolaga", written by Sonia Bazanta, and performed by Totó la Momposina.
- "ManyFacedGod" embodies portions of "Pillow Talk", written by Michael Burton, and performed by Sylvia Robinson; a sample of "Going in Circles", written by Jerry Peters and Anita Poree, and performed by Dwight T. Ross; and an interpolation of "Partition", written by Terius Nash, Dimitri Jay, Beyoncé, Justin Timberlake, Timothy Mosley, Jerome Harmon, Dwane Weir and Mike Dean, and performed by Beyoncé.

== Personnel ==
Adapted from digital booklet.

Musicians

- Steve Wyreman – guitar (tracks 2, 7, 9, 12), bass (tracks 2, 7, 12), celeste (track 2), CS-80 (tracks 2, 12), electric piano (tracks 2, 7, 12), synths (tracks 7, 9), Hammond organ (track 9)
- Jonah Levine – trombone (track 7)
- Crystal Rovél Torres – trumpet and flugelhorn (track 7)
- Kenneth Whalum – tenor sax (track 7)
- Nathan Mercereau – French horn (track 7), guitar (track 9), piano (track 9), Moog (tracks 9, 12), ARP String Ensemble (track 12), celeste (track 12)
- Ron Gilmore Jr. – vocoder (track 9)
- James Blake – piano (tracks 11, 13)

Technical

- Gimel "Young Guru" Keaton – recording
- Jimmy Douglass – mixing
- Dave Kutch – mastering
- James Fauntleroy – vocal production (Kim Burrell on track 5)
- Stuart White – vocal recording (Beyoncé on track 6)
- Mike Miller – vocal recording (The-Dream on track 9)
- Michael Law Thomas – additional recording engineering (track 7)
- Casey Cuayo – assistant engineering (track 7)

Artwork

- Willo Perron – creative direction
- Brian Roettinger – art direction

== Charts ==
=== Weekly charts ===
Chart (2017)	Peak position
Australian Albums (ARIA)	3
Austrian Albums (Ö3 Austria)	11
Belgian Albums (Ultratop Flanders)	14
Belgian Albums (Ultratop Wallonia)	63
Canadian Albums (Billboard)	1
Czech Albums (ČNS IFPI)	38
Danish Albums (Hitlisten)	18
Dutch Albums (Album Top 100)	11
French Albums (SNEP)	43
German Albums (Offizielle Top 100)	15
Irish Albums (Official Charts)	8
Italian Albums (FIMI)	69
Japanese Albums (Oricon)	88
New Zealand Albums (RMNZ)	10
Norwegian Albums (VG-lista)	11
Polish Albums (ZPAV)	27
Portuguese Albums (AFP)	33
Scottish Albums (Official Charts)	6
Slovak Albums (IFPI)	32
Spanish Albums (Promusicae)	61
Swedish Albums (Sverigetopplistan)	16
Swiss Albums (Schweizer Hitparade)	5
Swiss Albums (Romandie)	1
UK Albums (Official Charts)	3
US Billboard 200	1
US Top R&B/Hip-Hop Albums (Billboard)	1

=== Year-end charts ===
Chart (2017)	Position
US Billboard 200	36
US Top R&B/Hip-Hop Albums (Billboard)	15

== Certifications ==
Region	Certification	Certified units/sales
United Kingdom (BPI)	Silver	60,000^{‡}
United States (RIAA)	2× Platinum	2,000,000^{‡}
^{‡} Sales+streaming figures based on certification alone.

- By July 2, the album was offered as a free download, sponsored by Sprint, via the website 444.tidal.com. Those album downloads—which were free to the consumer but purchased by Sprint for distribution—were counted by the RIAA towards the Platinum certification. Roc Nation told Billboard that the certification reflects those 1 million downloads, and no streams were applied towards the certification.

== See also ==
- List of Billboard 200 number-one albums of 2017
- List of Billboard number-one R&B/hip-hop albums of 2017
- List of number-one albums of 2017 (Canada)
