= Bibi McGill =

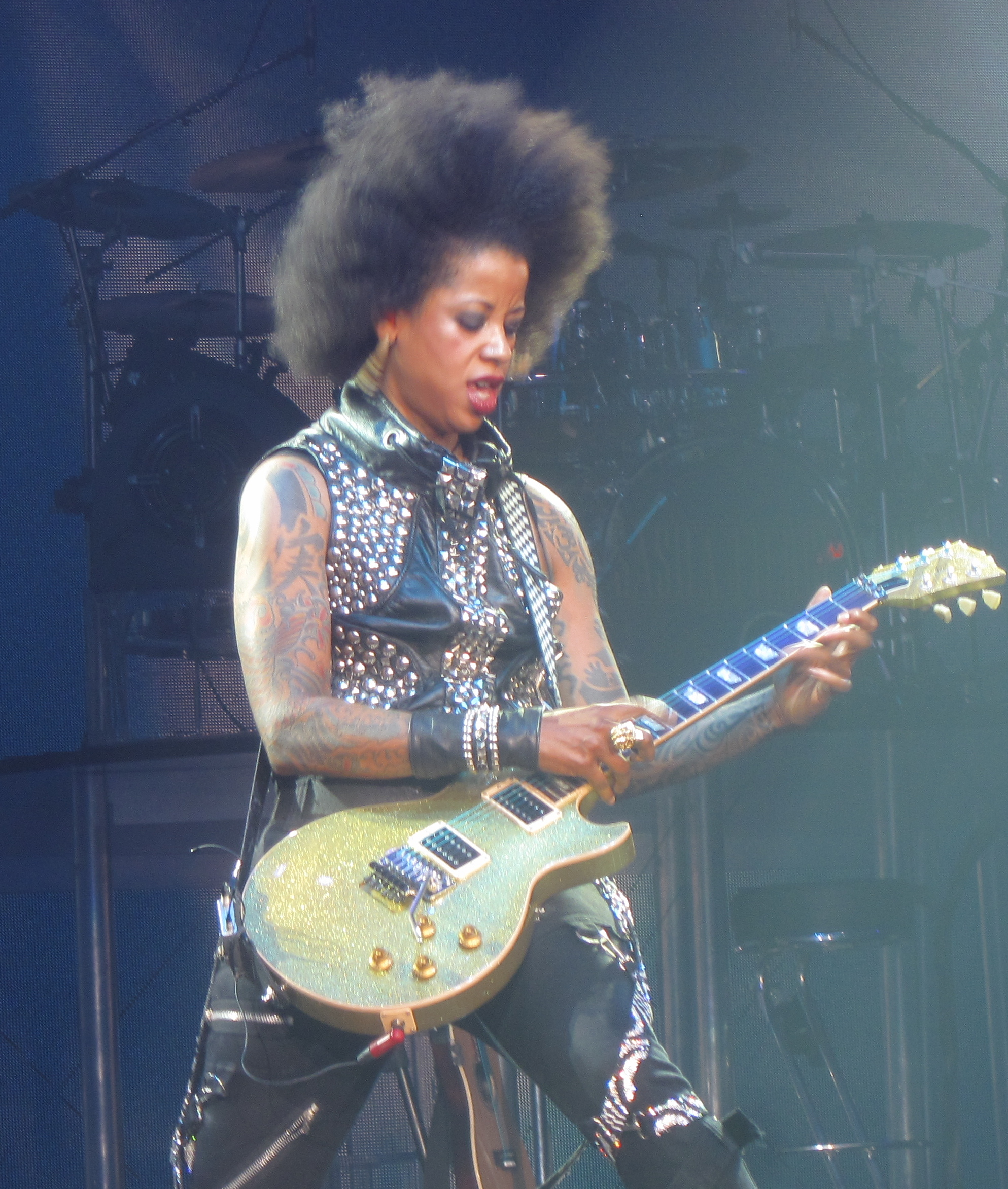
- McGill performing on the I Am... Tour

Background information
- Born: Belinda McGill; November 15, 1964 (age 61); Denver, Colorado, U.S.
- Genres: Rock; pop; R&B
- Occupation: Musician
- Instrument: Guitar
- Years active: 2000–present

Bibi McGill (born Belinda McGill) is an American guitarist, yogi, producer and DJ best known as the lead guitarist and musical director of Beyoncé's backing band, the Suga Mamas, as well as for her work with P!nk, Paulina Rubio and Chilean rock group La Ley.

== Early life and career ==
McGill grew up in Denver, Colorado. She began playing guitar after her father witnessed her pretending to play guitar with a pool stick. He enrolled her in private lessons at age 12. In an interview with the Denver Post, McGill's mom recalled her playing guitar in the style of blues musician B. B. King. Her parents gave her the nickname of BB when she was born. When she started playing guitar, everyone kept calling her BB Queen but she didn't like the name so she changed the spelling to Bibi McGill. She played for the jazz band in school, her own punk band and the Denver Citywide Marching Band. She graduated from the University of Colorado with a degree in music scoring and arranging. When she saw that there were limited opportunities in the music scene in Denver, McGill moved to Los Angeles and began playing gigs in small clubs such as the Whiskey and The Viper Room. In the late 1980s, McGill was a part of a Christian metal band called Ezra. In 1988, they released a demo titled The Choice. The band was very well known in the Denver area. Before getting the gig with Pink, she auditioned for Courtney Love and was waiting for Mick Jagger to return to the United States because he was looking for a female guitarist. She recalls in an interview with Ebony Magazine getting a call from Pink's team to perform with her on Saturday Night Live based on her notoriety from her performances in clubs around Los Angeles. She has also done modeling on the side and appeared in commercials for Heineken, Motorola and Nike.

== Pink, Paulina Rubio, and La Ley (2001–2005) ==
In 2001, she was hired by Pink for her promotional tour and appeared with her on Saturday Night Live, Total Request Live, the Billboard Music Awards, The Tonight Show and Top of the Pops. Along with appearing in Pink's music video for Don't Let Me Get Me, she performed with her on Dick Clark's New Years Rockin' Eve to ring in the year 2002. In 2002, she went on tour with Paulina Rubio's band on Enrique Iglesias's tour that year. She also performed with her on the 1st annual Los Premios MTV Latinoamerica previously known as the MTV Video Music Awards Latinoamerica where she performed a cover of the Kiss song, "I Was Made For Loving You" with Rubio. From 2003-2005, McGill toured with the Chilean Rock group La Ley. She performed the songs Hombre and Aqui at the Vina del Mar International Song Festival in 2005.

== Beyoncé and Suga Mamas (2006–2014) ==
After getting tired of the physical demands of touring, she decided to give it up and commit to living a peaceful life. In 2006, pop recording artist Beyoncé was looking for an all -female band to empower women. A member of Beyonce's team called McGill's father who was a barber at the time and has cut his hair for years. He called her to encourage her to go to the audition. The team member heard about McGill through her father and recommended her when Beyoncé did a worldwide press release for auditions. McGill first told her dad no but then regretted the decision and decided to go to tell him that she went. McGill got the gig during a call back after the first audition for Beyoncé's 10-piece, all-female band, the Suga Mamas in 2006 as lead guitarist, later becoming musical director for the Beyoncé Experience and I Am...World Tour. With Beyoncé's band she has toured around the world in four of Beyoncé's tours, The Beyoncé Experience (2007), The I Am...World Tour (2009-2010), Mrs. Carter World Tour (2013-2014), and the On The Run Tour (2014) with Beyoncé and Jay-Z. She also played in three specials: I Am...Yours live at the Wynn Las Vegas (2009), Live At Roseland Ballroom (2011) and Beyonce Live in Atlantic City (2012). While playing for Beyonce, she performed at various awards shows, TV shows and variety shows such as Good Morning America, the Today show, the Grammys, American Music Awards, World Music Awards, The Oprah Winfrey Show and the BET Awards. McGill has also performed with Beyonce at the White House for President Barack Obama and Michelle Obama's 50th birthday party and also played at various festivals such as the Glastonbury Festival in 2011. McGill's has had some of her most memorable solos during the Beyonce era. On the Beyoncé Experience and I Am...World Tour, she performed a solo during Freakum Dress and was known for the phrase "Bibi Take Me Higher" after Beyoncé shouted it before her solo. McGill's Freakum dress solo is known for its Randy Rhoads style. She has also done solos for If I Were A Boy and I Care. In 2013, at the Super Bowl halftime show in 2013, Bibi performed a "pyrotechnic guitar solo" where fireworks shot out of her Randy Rhoads signature Jackson guitar. The pyrotechnic stunt was performed during the song Crazy In Love. The solo went on to become the greatest and most notable solo of McGill's career and was praised by many including Rob Sheffield of Rolling Stone Magazine calling the performance a "ready-made obligatory-Slash cameo guitar solo. Along with the Beyoncé gig itself, the Super Bowl also gave McGill even more mainstream attention. Beyoncé's halftime show became the fourth most watched halftime show with 110.8 million viewers after Madonna's Super Bowl XLVI halftime show which was watched by 112.5 million viewers, Bruno Mars' Super Bowl XLVIII halftime show with 115.3 million viewers and Katy Perry's Super Bowl XLIX halftime show with 118.5 million viewers. McGill received a lot of positive attention from both social media and music critics for the solo. McGill reprised her pyrotechnic solo on Beyoncé's Mrs. Carter Show World Tour that same year.

== Style, influences and instruments ==
McGill is known for her aggressive, funky and soulful rock style of guitar playing that has been often compared to Jimi Hendrix and Randy Rhoads. She grew up listening to Earth, Wind, and Fire and The Isley Brothers and went to see both bands in concert with her family. Once she branched out into rock, she listened to Led Zeppelin, Heart, The Eagles, Black Sabbath, and Iron Maiden. McGill has listed Randy Rhoads as her main influence for her style and is her all-time favorite guitarist. Along with her guitar playing style, McGill is also known for her signature Afro and tattoos which has made her stand out in her performances. The look also helped her get a lot more gigs because she stood out and brought attention. McGill stated in an interview with Curlynikki that first became inspired to wear an afro when she wanted something lower maintenance and less costly. McGill takes a lot of pride in her natural hair. She said that it makes her feel free and it feels good to know that it is her own texture. She said that her afro has also raised her confidence. Her artistic interests inspired her to get tattoos. McGill got her first tattoo at age 17 and continued from there. McGill described her tattoos as very personal. They include a Chinese Dragon, a scorpion for her zodiac sign of Scorpio, a female samurai which represents strength, a Japanese coy fish which represents peace and tranquility. One arm is in full color and has Japanese imagery and the other is black and white with Polynesian tribal tattoos. McGill stated in an interview with Curlynikki that they are inspired by creativity, art, images, and ideas that she thought were beautiful and meaningful. McGill has been sponsored by Gibson guitars and has used Gibson Les Pauls throughout her career from 2001-2013. She is also known for playing a Gibson SG standard with a Stetsbar Tremolo system while playing for Pink, and Flying V. In 2013, she played a Randy Rhoads Jackson signature at both the Super Bowl and Mrs. Carter Show World Tour. Currently, McGill uses Japanese FGN, Fender, and ESP guitars. She also uses Line 6 mod amps live and Quilter Amps and analog pedals in the studio. In 2017, McGill began a sponsorship by D'Angelico guitars.

== Bibi Kale Chips ==
In 2011, McGill was inspired to start her own line of organic, gluten free, vegan Kale Chips when growing her own food in her garden. She had a hard time finding kale chips in her area and decided to make her own but the recipes that she came by were not interesting to her. Her recipe included cashews, red peppers, and spices. Her method of preparing the chips included dehydration to keep the nutritional value and ingredients. She shared them with her friends and Beyoncé bandmates and they loved it. She booked a commercial kitchen and started selling them in local Portland stores and online. McGill is the CEO of Bibi Food Enterprises.

== Yoga, wellness, music and business ventures (2015–present) ==
After McGill's last tour with Beyoncé, the On The Run Tour in 2014, McGill's contract with her ended and she decided to officially end her gig with Beyoncé to focus on other things that she is passionate about. One of those passions is teaching yoga. McGill discovered yoga in 1996. In an interview with Curlynikki, McGill stated that she was always drawn to a holistic lifestyle since she was young. She always had an interest in living in a more natural way and eat healthier than how she ate growing up. After taking her first yoga class, McGill knew that it was something that she wanted to incorporate into her lifestyle. She became certified to teach yoga in 2004 in Koh Samui, Thailand with Paul Dallaghan, an Ashtangi from Ireland, and studied meditation, Sanskrit, history and philosophy. In between touring with Beyoncé, McGill has been teaching yoga at Root Whole Body in Portland, Oregon since moving there in 2007 when she wanted a more peaceful environment. McGill loved the outdoor beauty, laid-back people and consciousness of the city and that is what encouraged her to move there. McGill also performs as a DJ and teaches both yoga and performs DJ sets at various festivals such as the Wanderlust Festival and Arise Festival in Loveland, Colorado. Along with Yoga and DJing, McGill has also hosted tea ceremonies. McGill's interest in nature and plants has drawn her to tea. She was inspired to host her own tea ceremonies after attending them in Portland. She was drawn to the medicinal properties of tea and the fact that it can heal different aspects of your biological and physical body, digestion and energy. She has also been playing with different Kirtan artists such as Simirit Kaur, Gurunam Singh Shantala who are local Portland artists. McGill is also a producer. She has produced Gurunam Singh's 2015 single "Gobinday" and a "Believe" a song featuring the students of Open School North in Portland during her artist residency. McGill can also be heard on composer Carol Duboc's 2016 album "Open The Curtains" featuring other well known female musicians such as Sheila E., Patrice Rushen, Mindi Abair, Rhonda Smith and Jennifer Batten and Venzella Joy's "Orange Moon EP" who was a fellow Beyoncé bandmate.

== Impact ==
McGill has become one of the most notable and popular female guitarists of all time and in 2017, Guitar Player Magazine has named her one of the 50 most sensational female guitarists of all time. In 2015, she made the cover of "She Shreds", a magazine that celebrates female guitarists.
