= Live in Atlantic City (Beyoncé video) =

2013 live video album by Beyoncé

Video by Beyoncé
- Released: November 22, 2013
- Recorded: May 25–28, 2012
- Venue: Revel Casino Hotel (Atlantic City)
- Genre: R&B
- Length: 75:09
- Labels: Columbia; Parkwood
- Directors: Beyoncé; Ed Burke

Beyoncé chronology
Live at Roseland: Elements of 4 (2011)	Live in Atlantic City (2013)	Beyoncé (2013)

Live in Atlantic City is the eighth video album by American singer-songwriter Beyoncé. It was released on November 22, 2013, by Columbia Records and Parkwood Entertainment.

Released as a part of the home video for her autobiographical television film Life Is But a Dream, Live in Atlantic City contains footage from Beyoncé's four-night residency show at Revel Casino Hotel in Atlantic City, Revel Presents: Beyoncé Live (2012). The concert film was directed by Ed Burke and Beyoncé herself. It encompasses live performances of 21 songs, while the album includes Beyoncé's previously unreleased "God Made You Beautiful" as a bonus audio track.

A commercial success, Live in Atlantic City peaked atop the US Top Music Videos alongside Life Is But a Dream, becoming Beyoncé's fourth number-one album on the chart. Furthermore, it reached the top ten in numerous other countries, being certified platinum in the United Kingdom. To promote the album, Beyoncé premiered videos for performances of "Schoolin' Life", "Dance for You" and "Party" via her YouTube channel.

== Background ==
On February 16, 2013, Beyoncé released Life Is But a Dream, an autobiographical television film. It premiered on HBO, garnering 1.8 million viewers for the initial broadcast, becoming the largest audience for a documentary since Nielsen Media Research revised its method of measuring viewership in 2004. However, critical commentary towards Life Is But a Dream was mixed with divided opinions by critics.

== Film synopsis ==
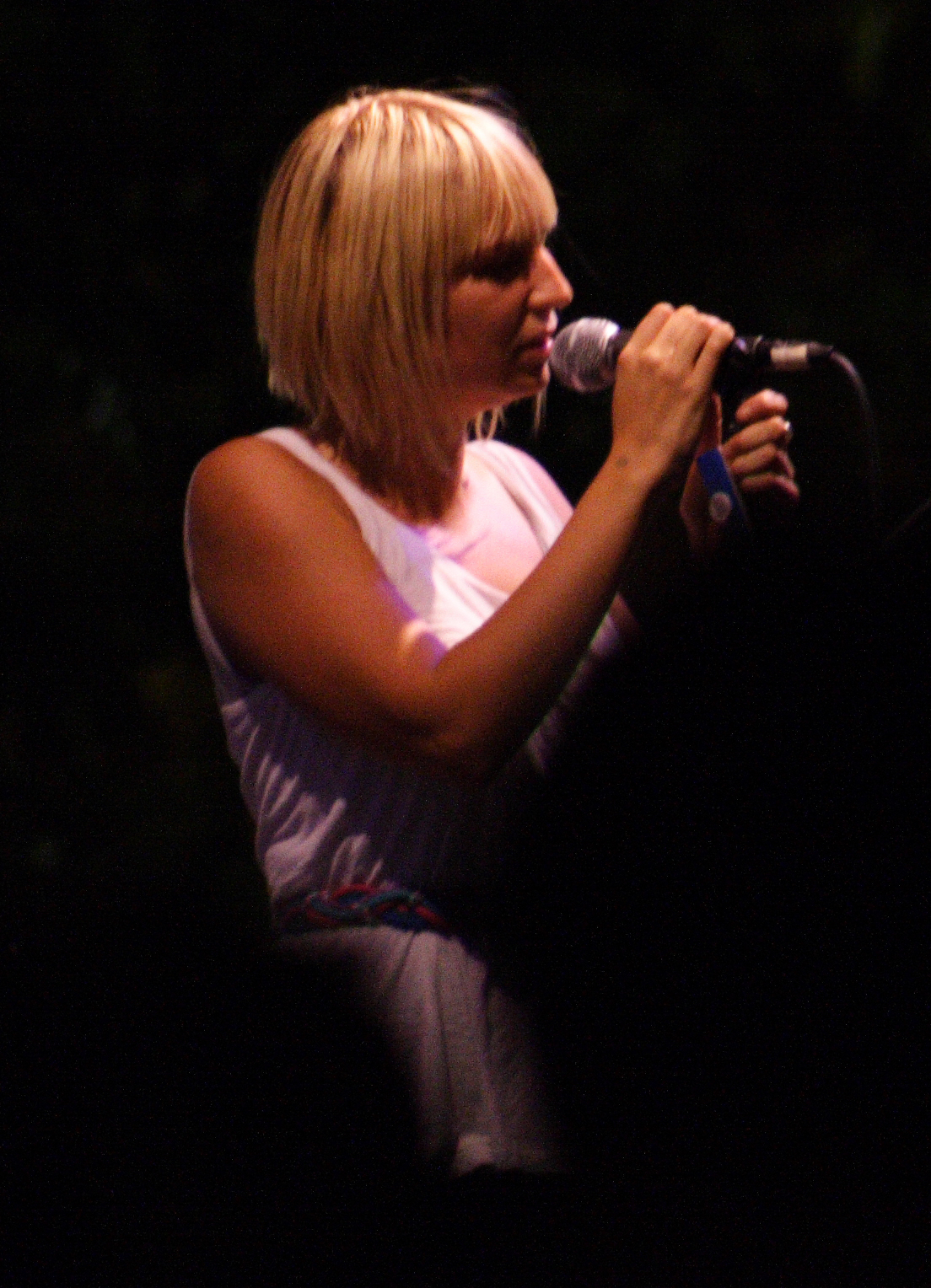
Australian singer-songwriter Sia (pictured) wrote "God Made You Beautiful"

Live in Atlantic City contains live performances of twenty-one songs along with a new song "God Made You Beautiful", written by Australian singer-songwriter Sia. Several short excerpts of the performances found on the film are also featured in Life Is But a Dream itself. The film opens with Beyoncé appearing in front of a large screen with her silhouette being seen. As the music of "End of Time" starts, she performs a choreography with her female dancers and French duo Les Twins on stage further singing the song's lyrics. "Get Me Bodied" follows with a similarly choreographed performance and for the third song "Baby Boy", the singer dances with her background dancers in front of a holographic background performing a Dutty Wine dance at the end. "Crazy in Love" and "Diva" are featured as the fourth and fifth song, respectively. "Naughty Girl" is preceded by a video projection with a voice-over by Beyoncé talking about female sexuality. A snippet of Donna Summer's "Love to Love You Baby" is interpolated within it and the singer performs the song with her female dancers. She continues with "Party" for which a prominent Las Vegas showgirl theme is featured.

Prior to starting "Dance for You", Beyoncé announces to the audience that she is going to dance to the song without singing it. "Freakum Dress" opens with a short interlude during which several dancers appear onstage dancing with long dresses. Beyoncé appears and performs the song, interacting with her guitarist towards the end. "I Care" is performed by the singer alone on stage and during "Schoolin' Life" a laser show is displayed for a choreographed dance. "1+1" sees Beyoncé singing the song atop a piano and "Flaws and All" follows. "Run the World (Girls)" is preceded by a video interlude set to the music of "Countdown", shown on the screen onstage. A video featuring various footage from Beyoncé's life follows as she recites the lyrics from her song "I Was Here". After that, she performs the opening lines of "I Will Always Love You" a cappella as a tribute to Whitney Houston and continues with her own song "Halo". "Single Ladies (Put a Ring on It) is performed afterwards with the same choreography from its music video and "Green Light" is used as the encore. "Love on Top" is the last song on Live in Atlantic City, performed by Beyoncé and her dancers as the credits for the concert film are shown.

"God Made You Beautiful" is featured as a bonus audio song on the album and it premiered online on November 22, 2013. It is a down-tempo ballad, with a staccato beat and a gospel-tinged chorus. Instrumentally, it consists of drums, strings, pianos, runs and hand claps. It opens with an "echoey" a cappella choir and it lyrically talks about Beyoncé and Jay-Z's daughter Blue Ivy as the singer tells that she "brought me back to life/you bring me back to life."

== Release ==
Live in Atlantic City's home video release for DVD and Blu-ray formats was announced on October 30, 2013 along with a trailer. During the video, it was revealed that the release included a two-disc set, with the second part, Live in Atlantic City, being bonus concert footage filmed during Beyoncé's four-night residency show Revel Presents: Beyoncé Live at Revel Atlantic City between May 25–28, 2012. A new song, titled "God Made You Beautiful", was also featured on the concert film and heard as the background music in the trailer. The home media release was made available for pre-order on November 1, 2013. Live in Atlantic City was first released in Germany and the Netherlands on November 22, 2013 as part of the two-disc set of Life Is But a Dream. Three days later, the DVD was also released in the United States, Canada and the United Kingdom, and the Blu-ray edition was released in the latter country the same day. In the United States, the Blu-ray edition was released on December 17, 2013.

After the film was released, videos of the performances of three songs were released online. The performance of "Schoolin' Life" from the film was previewed on Beyoncé's official YouTube channel on November 25, 2013. A writer of Vibe magazine felt that the laser light show from the performance "brighten[ed] up Atlantic City". The performance of "Dance for You" was also uploaded to the singer's channel two days later. The live rendition of "Party" was the final uploaded video from the concert film on December 2. John Walker of MTV reviewed it positively writing: "The sparkling, goddess-like centerpiece in a swirling sea of pink feathers, Beyoncé shines like a true showgirl on stage. Thankfully, unlike the 1995 camp classic, none of her backup dancers look nefarious enough to try anything funny". Walker further praised Beyoncé's vocals and dance moves as "on point as always" and the "flawlessly areolicious bustier" she wore.

== Commercial performance ==
On November 30, 2013, Live in Atlantic City debuted at number four on the Dutch Music DVD Chart and later peaked at number two. (Note: The positions and sales of Live in Atlantic City are of Life Is But a Dream because the concert film is a part of it.) The same week it also debuted at number ten on the Belgian Music DVD Chart in Flanders and at number thirty on the French Music DVD Chart. The next week, the album moved to number nine on the French Music DVD Chart, setting a new peak position in that country. On the Spanish Music DVD Chart it peaked at number eleven on November 25, 2013, which became its only placement outside of the top ten on a DVD chart.

The album debuted at number one in the United Kingdom on December 7, 2013, becoming Beyoncé's first UK Music Video Chart number-one. It remained at the top in its second week, before falling to number two by One Night at the Palladium (2013) by Robbie Williams the following week. It spent six more weeks within the top five on the chart and it was seen for the last time on May 31, 2014 at number forty, having spent a total of twenty-six weeks on the chart. On December 27, 2013 the British Phonographic Industry (BPI) certified the album platinum for shipments of 50,000 copies in the United Kingdom. In the United States, Live in Atlantic City became Beyoncé's fourth number-one album on the Top Music Videos chart, debuting on top for the week of December 14, 2013. In Australia, the album peaked at number two on the chart and was certified gold by the Australian Recording Industry Association (ARIA) for shipments of 7,500 copies.

== Track listing ==
Live in Atlantic City – Standard edition
No.	Title	Length
1.	"End of Time"
2.	"Get Me Bodied"
3.	"Baby Boy"
4.	"Crazy in Love"
5.	"Diva"
6.	"Naughty Girl"
7.	"Party"
8.	"Dance for You"
9.	"Freakum Dress"
10.	"I Care"
11.	"Schoolin' Life"
12.	"1+1"
13.	"Flaws and All"
14.	"Countdown"
15.	"Run the World (Girls)"
16.	"I Was Here"
17.	"I Will Always Love You"
18.	"Halo"
19.	"Single Ladies (Put a Ring on It)"
20.	"Green Light"
21.	"Love on Top" (End credits)

Live in Atlantic City – Bonus song download
No.	Title	Writer(s)	Length
1.	"God Made You Beautiful"	Beyoncé; Chris Braide; Sia Furler	4:41

== Personnel ==
Credits for Live in Atlantic City taken from the album's liner notes and Beyoncé's official website.

- Creative director – Beyoncé
- Director of choreography – Frank D. Gatson Jr.
- Musical director – Kim Burse, Derek Dixie
- Visual content directors – Beyoncé, Ed Burke
- Lighting designer – LeRoy Bennett
- Band – Rebecca Buxton, Cora Coleman-Dunham, Kiku Collins, Bibi McGill, Katty Rodríguez-Harrold, Lauren Taneil Robinson, Rie Tsuji, Britanni Washington
- Background vocals – Crystal Collins, Montina Donnell, Tiffany Riddick
- Dance captain – Ashley Everett
- Dancers – Larry Bourgeois, Laurent Bourgeois, Sarah Burns, Anthony Burrell, Tanesha Cason, Olivia Cipolla, Hannah Douglas, Amandy Fernández, Kimmie Gipson, Christina Owens, Ryan Ramírez
- Co-choreographers – Chris Grant, JaQuel Knight
- Assistant choreographer – Danielle Polanco
- Contributing choreographers – Beyoncé, James Aslop, Larry Bourgeois, Laurent Bourgeois, Anthony Burrell, Rhapsody James, Jonte Moaning, Sheryl Murakami, Christian Owens, Michelle Robinson, Ebony Williams
- Assistant to choreographers – Kristopher Mohfanz
- Director of wardrobe – Tina Knowles
- Head stylist – Ty Hunter
- Stylist – Raquel Smith
- Wardrobe assistants – Enid Gayle, Amber Glaspie, Taneka McLeod, Kwasi Fordjour
- Designers – Swarovski Crystals provided by Ralph & Russo, Dolce & Gabbana, David Koma, The Blonds, Stuart Weitzman and Scott Nylund, Timothy White and Enid Gayle for Tina Knowles
- Make-up artist – Francesca Tolot
- Hair stylist – Neal Farinah
- Nail stylist – Lisa Logan
- Band/dancers make-up – Crissy Gómez, Erica Martínez, Rashad Taylor, Yuki Ara
- Band/dancers hair – Yolanda Ward, Nikki Nelms, Eric Williams
- Additional show content – Alexander Hammer, Melina Matsoukas
- Show content writer – Angela Beyincé
- Additional content assistant – William Boisture
- Light board operator – Cory Fitzgerald
- Image director – Kevin Carswell
- Video server operation – Marc Andre Tremblay
- Digital media operator – Kevin Ryan
- Guitar tech – Sean O'Brian
- Keyboard tech – Cody Orell
- Drum tech – Marco Zambrano
- Crew chief/FOH cam – John Dennis Bedell
- LED tech/FOD cam – Russell Wingfield
- LED tech/dolly cam – Jeffrey Michael Gainer
- LED tech – Chad McClymonds
- Projectionist – Craig Leibowitz
- Projectionist/handheld cam – Christopher Alan Campbell
- LED/KI pro recording tech – Tyler Munson
- Engineer – Randall Schaffer
- LED engineer – Dustin King
- Project manager video – Barry Claxton
- FOH engineer – Christopher Rabold
- Band monitor engineer – Chauncey Burney
- Beyoncé monitor engineer – James Berry
- System engineer – Christopher Berry
- Monitor tech – John Switzer
- RF/P.A. – Victor Arko
- Head electric – David Bergeron
- Electricians – Antoine Malette, Scott Allan Walsh, Jean Francois Malette, Alex Boldue, Eric Cere
- Automation operator – Eric Pelletier
- Head rigger – Pat Ryan
- Head carpenter – William Shewmaker
- Project manager set & props – Tim Fallon
- Sets – Bryan Alexander Schluntz, Kevin William Levasseur, Bobby Lee Marshall
- Production assistant – Ashlee Senser
- Venue security – Pete Beattle
- Tour manager – Alan Floyd
- Visual content – Breathe Editing Inc.
- Show production manager – Alex Miasnikof
- Assistant show production manager – Shari Weber
- Set designer – Florian Weider
- Supervising art director – Talyn Wright
- Stage manager – Terry Cooley
- Theatrical director – Jennita Russo

== Charts ==
=== Weekly charts ===
Chart (2013–14)	Peak position
Australian Music DVD (ARIA)	2
Belgian Music DVD (Ultratop Flanders)	10
Brazilian Music DVD (PMB)	4
Dutch Music DVD (MegaCharts)	2
French Music DVD (SNEP)	9
German Music DVD (GfK Entertainment Charts)	10
Japanese Music DVD (Oricon)	104
Spanish Music DVD (PROMUSICAE)	11
UK Music Videos (Official Charts)	1
US Music Video Sales (Billboard)	1

=== Year-end charts ===
Chart (2013)	Position
Australian Music DVD (ARIA)	27
Belgian Music DVD (Ultratop Flanders)	37
Brazilian Music DVD (PMB)	5

Chart (2014)	Position
Belgian Music DVD (Ultratop Flanders)	16
Belgian Music DVD (Ultratop Wallonia)	29
Dutch Music DVD (MegaCharts)	18
US Music Video (Billboard)	5

== Certifications ==
Certifications for Life Is But a Dream
Region	Certification	Certified units/sales
Australia (ARIA)	Gold	7,500^{^}
France (SNEP)	Gold	7,500^{*}
United Kingdom (BPI)	Platinum	50,000^{*}
^{*} Sales figures based on certification alone.^{^} Shipments figures based on certification alone.

== Release history ==
List of release dates, showing region, format(s), label(s) and reference(s)
Region	Date	Format(s)	Label(s)	Ref.
Netherlands	November 22, 2013	DVD	Sony Music	
Germany	November 22, 2013	DVD	Sony Music	
Canada	November 25, 2013	DVD	Sony Music	
United Kingdom	November 25, 2013	DVD; Blu-ray	RCA	
United States	November 25, 2013	DVD	Columbia; Parkwood	
Poland	November 26, 2013	DVD	Sony Music	
Australia	November 29, 2013	DVD	Sony Music	
Turkey	December 5, 2013	DVD	Sony Music	
United States	December 17, 2013	Blu-ray	Columbia; Parkwood	
