= Live in Atlantic City =

Live in Atlantic City may refer to:

- Live in Atlantic City (Beyoncé video), 2013
- Live in Atlantic City (Heart album), 2019
