= Dance for You =

2011 song by Beyoncé

Song by Beyoncé

from the album 4
- Released: June 28, 2011
- Recorded: 2011
- Studio: MSR (New York City); Real World (Box, Wiltshire)
- Genre: R&B
- Length: 6:17
- Label: Columbia
- Songwriters: Terius Nash; Beyoncé Knowles; Christopher Stewart
- Producers: The-Dream; Beyoncé

Music video
- "Dance for You" on YouTube

"Dance for You" is a song by American singer Beyoncé from the deluxe edition of her fourth studio album, 4 (2011). It was written by Beyoncé, Terius "The-Dream" Nash and Christopher "Tricky" Stewart, while production was handled by the former two. "Dance for You" is a midtempo R&B song, in which Beyoncé adopts sensual vocals. The instrumental elements used on it include echoing drum patterns and clapping synthesizers. In "Dance for You", Beyoncé, as the female protagonist, speaks of the love she has for her man and about all the things she will do to show him her appreciation.

"Dance for You" was well received by contemporary music critics, who noted its similarity to songs by Janet Jackson and the Weeknd; they also praised its production and Beyoncé's vocals. Following the release of 4, "Dance for You" charted at number 200 on the South Korean International Singles Chart, and at number 147 on the UK Singles Chart. Though the song was never released as a single, it appeared on several charts in the United States based on radio support. "Dance for You" reached number 78 on the Billboard Hot 100 chart, and number six on the Hot R&B/Hip-Hop Songs chart.

Its music video was directed by Beyoncé and Alan Ferguson. The clip debuted on November 25, 2011 and was placed on the concert DVD Live at Roseland: Elements of 4 (2011). Inspired by 1940s film noir, the video is shot in black-and-white and captures Beyoncé dancing and flipping her hair in a detective's office to seduce him. Critics wrote that the video contains some of Beyoncé's best and most sensual moves, called her a femme fatale, and commented that its concept effectively matched the song's lyrics. The song was part of Beyoncé's set list during her residency show Revel Presents: Beyoncé Live (2012) and her world tour the Mrs. Carter Show World Tour (2013).

== Background and composition ==
'Dance for You' is about giving yourself fully to one person, it’s about being able to lose control with the person you’re meant for. Both the melody and the lyrics make it one of my most intimate songs.

— Knowles on the song's concept

"Dance for You" was written by Beyoncé, Terius "The-Dream" Nash and Christopher "Tricky" Stewart, with production by Beyoncé and Nash. The song was recorded at MSR Studios in New York City and Real World Studios at Box, Wiltshire. It was made available on the deluxe edition of 4, which was available for purchase at Target Corporation until January 2012. The deluxe edition was released to iTunes Stores on January 2, 2012. It includes two additional tracks, "Schoolin' Life" and "Lay Up Under Me", and three remixes of "Run the World (Girls)" (2011). "Dance for You" is a midtempo R&B song with a sensual vibe. In the song, Beyoncé sexifies her vocals and sings over echoing drum patterns, an electric guitar, a bluesy guitar, church organs, and clapping synthesizers. "Dance for You" bears resemblance to Janet Jackson's work. Thematically, the song is similar to Beyoncé's "Speechless" (2003) and Destiny's Child's "Cater 2 U" (2005); it is about showing appreciation and gratitude.

"Dance for You"
A sample of the bridge of "Dance for You", a sensual number, which makes use of pipe organs, clapping synthesizers, a bluesy guitar, and an electric guitar. Knowles sexifies her vocals over echoing drum patterns and a lap-dance theme.

In "Dance for You", Beyoncé, as the female protagonist, expresses her feelings to her man and tells him how devoted she is to him. Jocelyn Vena of MTV News wrote that the song is "about keeping things hot with her man". Echoing Vena's sentiments, Marc Hogan of Spin magazine described the lyrics as detailing a "triumphantly monogamous relationship". In the first verse, Beyoncé sings about how understanding, loyal, and patient her man is. She further states that she really cares about his heart, she has a lot of valuable things to say, and that for all these reasons, she is going to dance for him.

After telling her love interest to "sit back and watch", Beyoncé sings the chorus, where she states the things she will do to show her appreciation to her love interest, "Tonight I'm gonna dance for you / Tonight I'm gonna dance for you / Tonight I'm gonna put my body on your body / Boy, I like it when you watch me / Tonight it's going down." In the second verse, she sings: "You'll never need two, because I will be your number one / Them other chicks are superficial / But I know you know I'm the one / That's why I'm all into you / Cuz I can recognize that you know that / That's why I’m backin' this thing back / Pop poppin' this thing back". Before the song ends, Beyoncé repeatedly chants "yes" in the background as the electric guitar crescendos into a piercing subliminal sound.

On October 20, 2012, a remix of the song featuring a rap verse from American rapper T.I. was released online. His rap appears at the three and a half minute mark of the song as he sings about "how he loves it when his lady gives it to him dirty when no one is around" and "lives out his fantasy with candlelight (for a little ambiance), lingerie and Louis Vuitton". He later adds, "I just want to watch the moon glisten off your body... I really just want to peel you out dem clothes and show you how excited I am to lay you down right now." The remix was well received by music critics. A writer of Vibe magazine commented that it "is sultry and will steam up any club, bedroom or wherever you like to get dirty". A writer of Rap-Up magazine described the remix as "amazing", adding that "[t]he bedroom will be banging to this remix". Similarly, X. Alexander of the website Idolator praised the remix, writing that T.I.'s vocals make the "smooth, bedroom-ready R&B track that much sexier".

== Critical reception ==
Carrie Batta of Pitchfork Media commented that the song is an "impeccable slow jam". Describing the song as "saucy", Pip Ellwood of Entertainment Focus wrote that "Dance for You" is the best of the three deluxe tracks. Natalie Finn of E! Online described the song as a "come-hither love letter to the man in her life, set to a sultry beat". By contrast, Joshua Glossner of The Daily Collegian found the song to be too lengthy, adding, "Well I hope she hurries up and shows him how much she loves him before the eternity-long track is done." He further noted that "Dance For You" immediately reminded him of Ciara's "Promise" (2006). Marc Hogan of Spin magazine found "Dance for You" to be "a sort of strip-club jam set, as with the rest of the album". He added that the song would fit squarely on a track by The Weeknd, owing to "the bluesy guitar and smoky organ". However, he concluded that "it's not exactly worth plunking down another 32 bucks for". Danielle Cheesman of MSN Music showed high favoritism for "Dance for You", writing:

'Dance for You' puts [Beyoncé] in the bedroom. Clocking in at over 6 minutes, the song of seduction plays as if it was being undressed, much like [Beyoncé] is, piece by piece, lyric for lyric. As with'Speechless' and 'Cater 2 U', [she] often forgoes the independent woman anthems and beautiful power ballads to remind us that she is a real sexual being rather than a formulated sex symbol. It is breathy, but not boring. It does not chronicle innocent lovemaking with sugarcoated terms, but the grittier things that really go down when you are completely comfortable (and overly confident) with, as she puts it, the person 'you'd like to thank, in case you don't thank them enough'.

At the 2013 ASCAP Rhythm & Soul Awards "Dance for You" was one of the songs to win in the category for Award-Winning R&B/Hip-Hop Songs.

== Chart performance ==
For the week ending July 30, 2011, "Dance for You" debuted at number 200 on the South Korean International Singles Chart, selling 3,142 digital downloads. For the week ending March 29, 2012, the song became the sixth song from 4 to chart on the US Billboard Hot R&B/Hip-Hop Songs as it debuted at number 76. "Dance for You" entered the top ten of the chart issue dated September 29, 2012 at number 10. It became Beyoncé's nineteenth top 10 as a soloist and extended her lead for the most top 10s among female artists since 2000. "Dance for You" marked the third time Beyoncé had claimed a quartet of top 10s from a single album. "Dance for You" continued its ascension on the Hot R&B/Hip-Hop Songs chart until it reached its peak position at number 6. On the US Mainstream R&B/Hip-Hop Airplay chart, the song marked Beyoncé's fifth top 10 - the first time she has claimed five top 10s on that tally from one album. For the week ending September 22, 2012, "Dance for You" debuted at number 100 on the US Billboard Hot 100. It later reached a peak at number 78.

== Music video ==
=== Background and concept ===
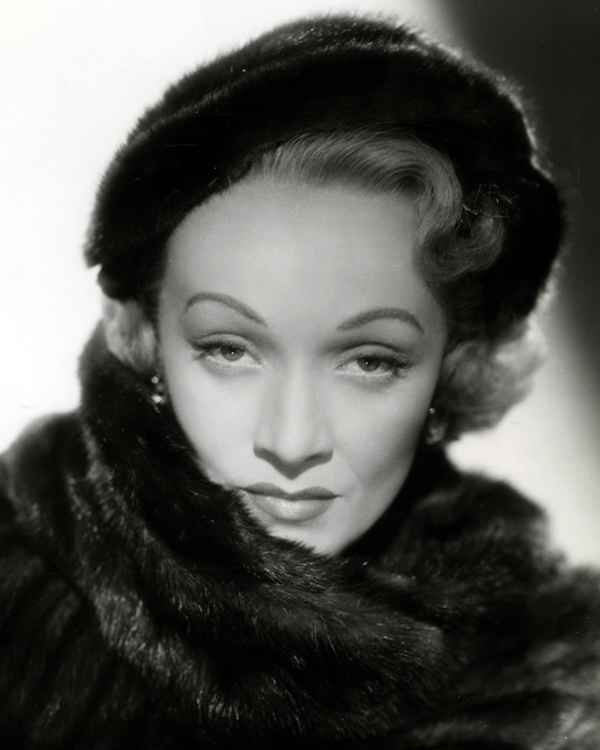
Beyoncé channels Marlene Dietrich (pictured) in the music video.

An accompanying music video for "Dance for You" was co-directed by Beyoncé and Alan Ferguson. It was filmed in a vintage New York City-styled office before Beyoncé's baby bump started showing. Two previews of the video were posted online on November 21, 2011. In the first preview, Beyoncé wears pants, garters and a wrap dress as she performs a sexy dance routine on a desk while a man (the late actor Brett G. Smith) watches her dance. In the second preview, she wears the same outfit and dances seductively in front of a chair in an office as the camera cuts to the same man, who is watching her. Beyoncé pays homage to German-American actress and singer Marlene Dietrich in the video as she channels a 1920s-inspired look and stars as a screen siren. In the behind-of the-scene of the video, Beyoncé said:

I wanted the video to have the same rawness that both the melody and the lyrics of the song have because "Dance for You" is one of my most intimate songs. I wanted the video to have a classic feel; to be seductive but still keep the sense of mystery. When I write, when I perform, and when I make music videos, I don’t hold anything back. 'Dance for You' is about that same passion; to be free and unrestrained.

Many critics, including Jocelyn Vena of MTV News and Erika Ramirez of Billboard magazine, noted that the clip was inspired by 1940s film noir. Similarly, The Improper Bostonian wrote that the setting looks like a Humphrey Bogart movie, further calling it "a clear take-off" on mid-20th Century film noir due to its utilization of sharp camera angles and deep shadows. Although initially planned to debut on November 27, 2011, the release of the video was changed to November 25, 2011. However, it premiered online before its official release on E! Online. "Dance For You" is the seventh video from 4. It was included on the deluxe edition of Live at Roseland: Elements of 4 (2011), which was released on November 29, 2011. The video was digitally released to iTunes Stores on November 27, 2011.

=== Reception ===
Many reviewers have commented on the sexiness displayed in the video. Erika Ramirez of Billboard magazine commented that the video was "sexy" and that "Beyoncé pops it back for a mysterious detective." Lewis Corner of Digital Spy wrote that Beyoncé dances "seductively" in the office. Andrew Martin of Prefix Magazine wrote: "To anyone who finds Beyoncé attractive or has ever wanted her to dance for them, we bring you her latest video. The visuals for 'Dance for You' are more or less a chance for her to show off why so many of you think her husband, Jay-Z, is the luckiest man alive." Leah Collins of Canadian magazine Dose wrote, "It's all very sultry and intimate to a point—that point being the moment she unveils a line-up of back-up dancers." Similarly, a writer of the website Idolator commented, "'Dance for You' doesn't compare to the spectacle of say, the 'Run the World (Girls)' clip, but it is effective. [...] It's a mostly private dance—until all those other ladies show up." The writer also called Beyoncé a femme fatale in the video. Likewise, Sarah Anne Hughes of The Washington Post wrote that Beyoncé "goes full on femme fatale" and concluded that the concept of the video "is about as straightforward as can be". Marc Hogan of Spin magazine noted, "The video follows pretty literally from the song's theme, with Mrs. Jay-Z grinding sensuously." A writer of Vibe magazine noted that Beyoncé was "keeping things sexy" with the video for the song.

Michael O'Connell of The Hollywood Reporter noted that the video contains Beyoncé's "trademark moves". Likewise, Ben Kaye of the website Consequence of Sound wrote, "[In the clip], we witness the always mesmerizing songstress seducing a private detective with a sultry version of the twisting and twerking she's famous for. Essentially, it's just what you'd expect from the track's lyrics, and that's in no way a bad thing." Contessa Gayles of The Boombox wrote that "Beyoncé rocks the racy shoot in satin hot pants, garters and a slinky wrap dress", further describing her look and the set as "sexy". Matt Donnelly of Los Angeles Times described the video as "sultry" and further found "a Jessica Rabbit vibe". Donnelly also wrote, "The video carries the standard Bey DNA—wind machines, plunging necklines and lots of hair. Not that we're complaining." Derek Johnson of Long Island Press commented that the video is "heating up the Internet and we're pretty sure we know why", referring to Beyoncé's figure. He further commended Beyoncé for taking viewers back to the days of black and white television and "into the office of a lonely detective on a rainy day. We've all seen that show before, but not like this." Natalie Finn of E! Online compared the video with the one for "Single Ladies (Put a Ring on It)" (2008), adding that it "sticks with the power of black and white", and describing the set as "naughty". Katie Hasty of the website HitFix praised Beyoncé's look in the video but commented, "If you're a hetero sexual lady detective, however, this is sort of boring."

== Live performances ==
Beyoncé performed the song for the first time as a part of her residency show Revel Presents: Beyoncé Live in Revel Atlantic City. The performance featured Beyoncé leading a group of ten dancers to perform a choreographed bump and grind dance. While performing the choreography, Beyoncé did not sing the song live, but was accompanied vocally by her three backup vocalists, the Mamas. The performance of "Dance for You" was later included on the live album Live in Atlantic City (2013) which was filmed during the revue. "Dance for You" was also performed during the opening shows of the first leg of Beyoncé's Mrs. Carter Show World Tour.

== Charts ==
=== Weekly charts ===
| Chart (2011–12) | Peak position |
|---|---|
| South Korea Gaon International Chart | 200 |
| UK Singles Chart (Official Charts Company) | 147 |
| US Billboard Hot 100 | 78 |
| US Hot R&B/Hip-Hop Songs (Billboard) | 7 |
| US R&B/Hip-Hop Airplay (Billboard) | 6 |

=== Year-end charts ===
| Chart (2012) | Position |
|---|---|
| US Hot R&B/Hip-Hop Songs (Billboard) | 33 |

== Certifications ==
| Region | Certification | Certified units/sales |
|---|---|---|
| Australia (ARIA) | Gold | 35,000^{‡} |
| Brazil (Pro-Música Brasil) | 2× Platinum | 120,000^{‡} |
| New Zealand (RMNZ) | Platinum | 30,000^{‡} |
| United Kingdom (BPI) | Silver | 200,000^{‡} |
| United States (RIAA) | 3× Platinum | 3,000,000^{‡} |
^{‡} Sales+streaming figures based on certification alone.
