= Revel Presents: Beyoncé Live =

2012 concert residency by Beyoncé

- Residency by Beyoncé
- Location: Atlantic City, New Jersey, U.S.
- Venue: Revel Atlantic City
- Associated album: 4
- Start date: May 25, 2012
- End date: May 28, 2012
- No. of shows: 4

Beyoncé concert chronology
- 4 Intimate Nights with Beyoncé (2011); Revel Presents: Beyoncé Live (2012); The Mrs. Carter Show World Tour (2013–14)

Revel Presents: Beyoncé Live (also called Back to Business) was the third concert residency by American singer-songwriter Beyoncé. Announced in March, and held during four consecutive nights in May 2012 in Atlantic City, New Jersey, the concerts were part of the opening of the new entertainment resort, hotel, casino and spa, Revel. Beyoncé stated that her alter ego Sasha Fierce was brought back to life for the performances and the main concept was that the birth of her first baby made her more grounded. She promoted the shows by projecting images and releasing behind-the-scenes footage on her official website.

The stage included several LED screens and the singer was backed by female background vocalists, all-female band and dancers. The set list contained songs from Beyoncé's four studio albums as well as several covers and "Jumpin', Jumpin'", which she recorded with her former girl group Destiny's Child. She collaborated on outfits with several fashion designers including Ralph and Russo, Swarovski, Dolce & Gabbana, David Koma and her mother, designer Tina Knowles. Critics praised the costumes and Beyoncé's look during the shows.

Revel Presents: Beyoncé Live received positive reviews from music critics who praised Beyoncé's vocals and dance abilities during the concerts calling it her post-pregnancy comeback show. Commercially, the shows were also successful with the tickets for all three shows being sold out in one minute on April 6, 2012, after they were made available for purchase. Later, when the fourth show was announced, it eventually sold out as well. Footage of the concert was used in Beyoncé's 2013 HBO documentary Life Is But a Dream; a concert recording, Live in Atlantic City, was included as part of the home video release of Life is But a Dream.

== Background and development ==
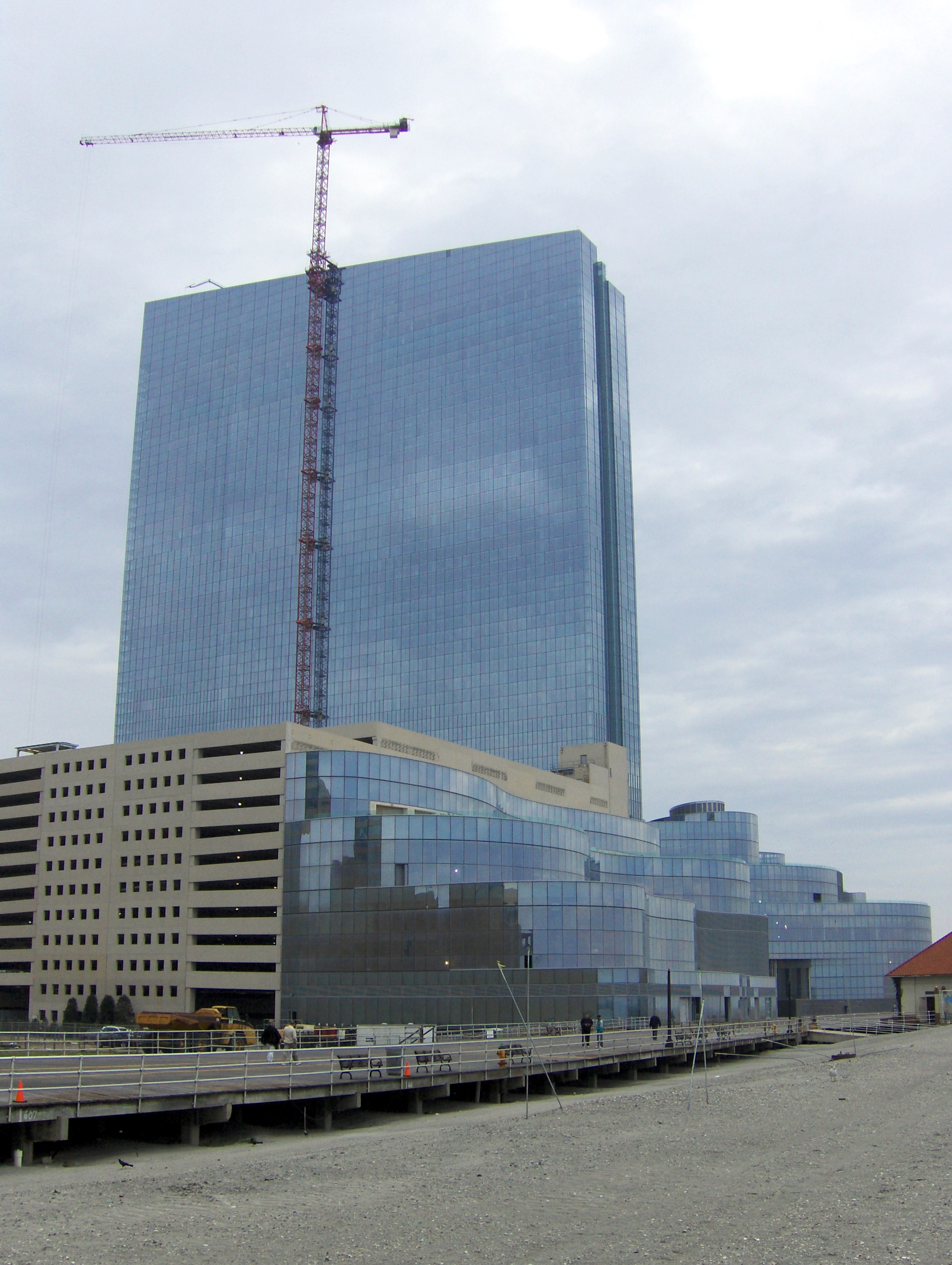
The residency concerts were held at Revel Atlantic City (pictured) to celebrate its opening.

On March 19, 2012, Beyoncé's publicist Yvette Noel-Schure announced that the singer would perform three shows (May 25–27, 2012) at Revel Atlantic City to inaugurate the resort and its Ovation Hall, a 5,050-seat concert venue. The concerts were noted as the singer's first performances since giving birth to her daughter, Blue Ivy Carter, in January of the same year and her first shows since the 4 Intimate Nights with Beyoncé residency in August 2011. Rehearsals began in March, two months prior to the date of the concerts as Beyoncé had to lose sixty pounds for the show after her pregnancy. James Dinh of MTV News wrote that it was further expected from the concerts to be "much more of a grand spectacle" in comparison with 4 Intimate Nights with Beyoncé, with high-tech LED display, intense choreography and video backdrops.

"Getting this show together and learning choreography and directing something so huge... For me to do all of this four months after giving birth, I feel like I went from zero to ten and it was really hard, but I did it so I'm hoping that somebody out there can be inspired by that."

— Beyoncé Knowles in Making of Revel, Behind the Scenes (Part II)

On March 20, 2012, several billboards by Beyoncé were projected on the Big Screen of the NASDAQ on Times Square advertising her show in Revel Atlantic City. On May 24, 2012, the first half of a behind-the-scenes video detailing the event premiered. It showed rehearsals and preparations for the show and a performance of "Halo". In it, Beyoncé stated that she is excited, yet nervous about the shows. She said "[Performing at Revel is] like going back to my old job and it's a little strange." She continued saying that it was vital for her not to lose herself and still have her own passion even after she became a mother, something she was accomplishing with the shows. Director/Choreographer Frank Gatson Jr. said that the show had the potential of being the greatest show of Beyoncé's career. The second behind-the-scenes video detailing the event premiered the next day, on May 25, 2012. During the video, Beyoncé stated that she tried to bring back to life her alter ego Sasha Fierce for the show. She further said that she is anxious about the show as her team was doing it in two weeks, unlike her previous shows which were prepared in two months. Beyoncé further revealed the concept of the show saying, "What I'm trying to say with the show ... yes, I had a baby, but it just made me more grounded". The concert was also called Back to Business referencing Beyoncé's song "Run the World (Girls)".

== Stage and set list ==
Onstage, Beyoncé was backed by her all-female band consisting of eleven members, background vocalists and ten dancers including the French duo Les Twins. The stage included several LED screens on which grainy-color videos were shown as well as several black and white geometric patterns. Video interludes with voice-overs recorded by Beyoncé were also shown. Dawn Fallik of The Wall Street Journal noted that the stage set offered "a seemingly endless number of screens and levels" for Beyoncé's all-female band. Jim Farber of the Daily News praised the look of the graphics saying that they were elegant and classic like a zebra's stripes. The light shows during the performances were "modest" as described by Ben Ratliff of The New York Times.

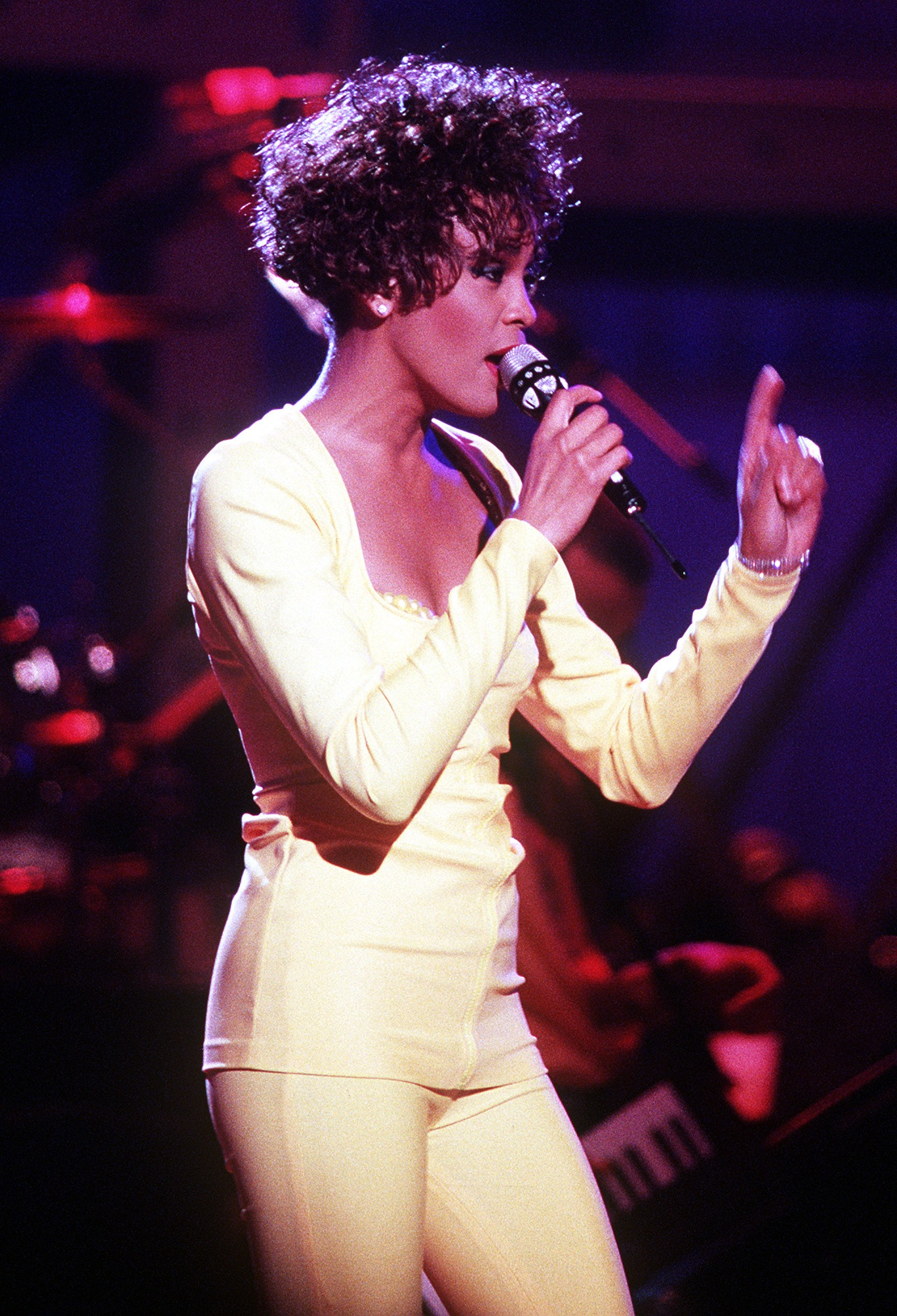
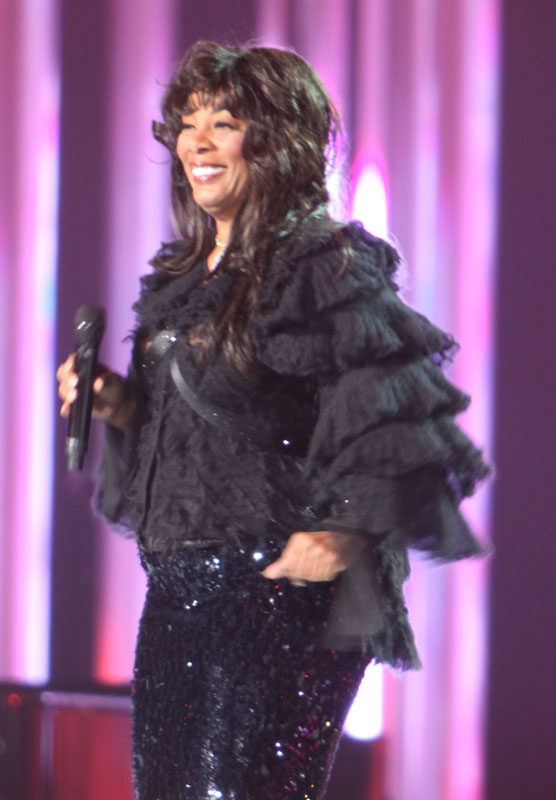
The show featured covers of "I Will Always Love You" by Whitney Houston (left) and Donna Summer's "Love to Love You Baby" as a tribute to the singers following their deaths.

Glenn Gamboa of Newsday wrote that the stage set of massive cubes was similar to the Watch the Throne Tour by Jay-Z and Kanye West and noted that the "complicated" system of screens which was used to leave an impression that Beyoncé and her dancers were stepping in and out of black-and-white images was influenced by the opening credits of James Bond films. He further noted, "There were so many striking visual images both on stage and on screen, the show felt like a Pinterest board come to life -- packed with bold colors and graphics, elegant modern dance positions and video clips." Tris McCall of The Star-Ledger also compared the light-up platforms on the stage with the towering cubes used during the Watch the Throne Tour. In another review, he noted, "The light show was as hypnotic as Laser Floyd, the costumes glittered like mirror balls, and the bass at Ovation Hall was so booming that I often felt like I was standing in a stiff wind." Chuck Darrow of the Philadelphia Media Network wrote,

"Beyonce's name might have been the one on the ticket for the two-hour, 27-song program, but those responsible for its design and staging deserve as much credit as anyone. The show's visual centerpiece was a stage-spanning video display screen offering an endless array of multi-hued shapes and geometric patterns, not to mention crystal-clear wide shots and close-ups of the star. The result was a dramatic presentation befitting a performer of Beyonce's magnitude."

The set list contained songs from Beyoncé's four studio albums as well as "Jumpin', Jumpin'", which she recorded with Destiny's Child. In addition to performing her songs, Beyoncé also covered Whitney Houston's version of "I Will Always Love You" (1992) during the performance of "Halo", Donna Summer's "Love to Love You Baby" (1975) during the performance of "Naughty Girl", Goo Goo Dolls' "Iris" (1998) during "If I Were a Boy" and Lauryn Hill's "Ex-Factor" (1998). Caryn Ganz of Spin magazine noted that Beyoncé's up-tempo songs were performed at the beginning of the concert. Fallik of The Wall Street Journal noted that the show "relied too much on lesser-known, slower songs that lulled the crowd into their seats instead of bringing them to their feet" and added that "only a couple songs called for much movement".

== Fashion and wardrobe ==
The shows featured couture costumes designed by fashion house Ralph and Russo. Designer Tamara Ralph said Beyoncé asked them to be "really creative" while creating items with "an ultra-glamorous feel to them". The duo's inspiration was "modern showgirl", paying attention to the "comfort and flexibility of each outfit and the ease of getting in and out of the pieces with quick costume changes". All the crystals for the show were provided by Swarovski; a team of 20 couturiers worked to complete the looks, which were embellished with more than 500,000 crystals from Swarovski Elements in four weeks. Beyoncé wore shoes by Stuart Weitzman. The dancers were dressed in Dolce & Gabbana and David Koma clothes. The band wore Alexander Vauthier clothes while The Mamas wore pin-up girl clothing. Some clothes for the show were also designed by Beyoncé's mother Tina Knowles. Beyoncé also worked with David Koma who designed a panelled bodysuit with lace detailing. Koma described his collaboration during an interview with Vogue, saying, "I absolutely love to work with Beyoncé and her team and I'm very happy that she is back... She looks more beautiful than ever and it's always a pleasure to work with her!". Co-designer Michael Russo further described his collaboration with Beyoncé, "Beyoncé always delivers energetic performances... It was an absolute pleasure to work with her to create exquisite pieces that dazzle on stage."

Beyoncé changed costumes five times during the show. Her looks ranged from a sparkling fringed set to a red leotard. Her fashion during the shows received praise from critics. Celia L. Smith of Essence magazine described Beyoncé's look as "fabulous" while further calling her costumes "dazzling" and "fierce". A writer of Vogue magazine noted that Beyoncé's show "required something a little more spectacular than her recent dressed-down chic". Dawn Fallik of The Wall Street Journal commented that Beyoncé was "shedding costumes like a chameleon changing colors" during the show. He went on saying, "There were fashion montages with Beyonce in 1950s cat glasses, 1960s headbands and 1970s mod form" further concluding that the fashion was "all well and good". Chuck Darrow of the Philadelphia Media Network wrote in his review that the "shape-hugging, leg-baring costumes in which she was garbed were, by today's standards, [were] almost demure." Dan DeLuca of Philadelphia Inquirer noted that her "barely-there" outfits were designed to call attention to Beyoncé's physique "from the derriere down".

== Concert synopsis ==
Beyoncé opened the shows with a performance of "End of Time" as her silhouette appeared in front of a large screen. The performance contained triple-time drumbeats and background vocals from her background singers. A retro-soulful performance of "Love On Top" followed with Beyoncé saying "Atlantic City, snap your fingers". As she was performing a New Edition-inspired choreography and sang the song's modulations in an extended vocal showcase the crowd sang along with her. Afterwards, "Get Me Bodied" was performed with Bob Fosse-style swing and formations. Beyoncé performed the reggae dancehall song "Baby Boy" and during a "giddy" version of "Crazy in Love" she wore a cropped, spangled top and a mini skirt. During the performance of the song, pre-recorded vocals by Jay-Z who is featured on it were played. "Diva" was performed as the sixth song of the set.

Prior to the performance of "Naughty Girl", a spoken-word segment about female sexuality was shown with Beyoncé saying "Harnessing the power of your body requires responsibility". During the performance of the song she also included a sample of the groans and coos from Donna Summer's "Love to Love You Baby" and sang a snippet of it as a tribute to the singer following her death. During the performance of the eighth song, "Party", confetti were dropped on stage from the roof and dice-shaped beach balls were being tossed through the crowd as dancers in large feathered headdresses performed a choreography in the aisles. During "Dance for You", Beyoncé did not sing live but was accompanied vocally by her three backup vocalists and performed a choreographed bump and grind dance. She was wearing a black leotard during the performance of "Freakum Dress" which featured a strut-heavy footwork. During the performance of "I Care", Beyoncé matched the notes of her guitarist's solo and "Schoolin' Life" followed. "1+1" saw her singing the song seated on top of a piano and the performance focused on the singer and individual members of her band.

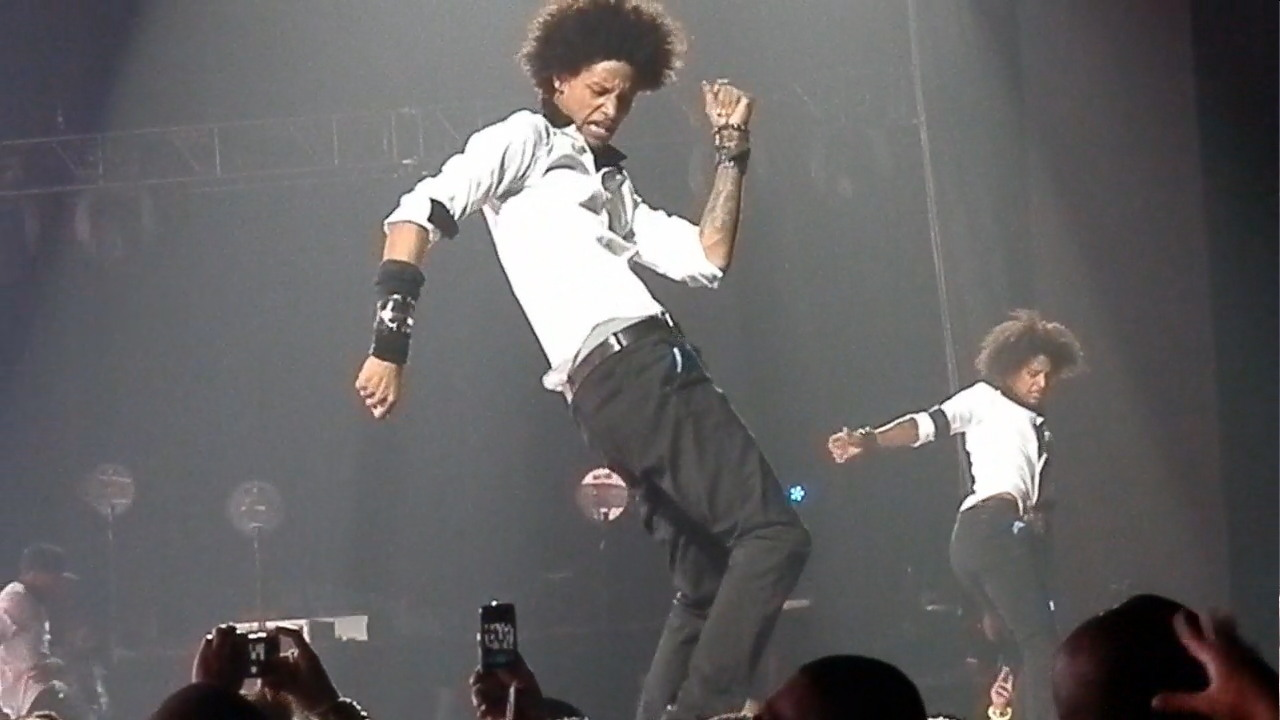
Dancing duo Les Twins performing during a concert of Revel Presents: Beyoncé Live

The ballad "I Miss You" was performed in front of an electronic backdrop in which a male dancer was silhouetted in kinetic, black-and-white stripes. A re-arranged version of "Resentment" followed with an acoustic guitar used for its musical backbone. Beyoncé opened the performance of "If I Were a Boy" saying "We all know how it feels to be hurt and lied to" and later turned it into a guitar-pop song, in which elements of Goo Goo Dolls' adult-alt ballad "Iris" were used. An acoustic cover of "Ex-Factor" originally performed by Lauryn Hill followed. "Flaws and All" featured Beyoncé making facial expressions as she dedicated the song to her fans, singing the lines, "I don't know why you love me/And that's why I love you."

During the performance of "Irreplaceable", she asked from the crowd to sing the lines "to the left" along with her and made a competition in singing between sections. The first verse and the chorus were sung solely by the crowd. The intro of "Countdown" began with Beyoncé's ululations and moans, the Boyz II Men sample used in the song, and the opening drum crack and continued with the song's music video being projected on the screen. Brief snippets of Beyoncé performing Destiny's Child's "Jumpin', Jumpin'" (2000) followed. "Run the World (Girls)" was performed with a march choreography and a funky version of "Why Don't You Love Me" followed. During the end, the song's beat got transformed into an extended outro. Prior the end of the show a home-video sequence showing Beyoncé biking, drinking a pint of Guinness, going whale-watching and holding her daughter Blue Ivy Carter with a voice-over was shown. Referencing her song "I Was Here" which was played in the background, she said "When I leave this world I'll leave no regrets. I will leave my mark, so everyone will know I was here". Beyoncé went on to perform "Halo" in a red dress which she opened with a performance of Whitney Houston's "I Will Always Love You" as a tribute to her following her death. The show ended with a performance of "Single Ladies (Put a Ring on It)" which featured a Bob Fosse-inspired choreography and a singalong with the crowd.

== Critical response ==
The concerts received positive response from music critics who praised Beyoncé's post-pregnancy performing abilities. A writer of Rap-Up described the show as a "triumphant" return to the stage. Adelle Platon of Vibe magazine described the show as post-pregnancy comeback to the stage and added that "it was her amazing set of throwbacks that cemented the fact that Bey[oncé] still runs the game." The Village Voice's Maura Johnston wrote that the Revel concerts showed how serious Beyoncé was about picking up her career exactly where she'd left it pre-maternity leave. Melinda Newman of the website HitFix praised Beyoncé's "incredible" performance even after she gave birth to her first child. Cathy Rainone of WVIT commented that Beyoncé was "fiercer than ever" during the shows. Glenn Gamboa of Newsday described it as her "most ambitious live show yet" and noted that "the reason for the shows... was to test herself, as a new mother and an artist." USA Today's Elysa Gardner praised the show, saying that "The singer was all business — that is to say, warm and gracious, glamorous and relentless. Backed by an all-female band and a tireless posse of dancers and backup vocalists, Beyonce reasserted her unique pop persona; she was at once angel and seductress, cool diva and woman of the people." She noted that with the performance of the concerts, Beyoncé reaffirmed "her solidarity with all her fans" and confirmed that she plans on "sticking around for a good long time."

"But right now Beyoncé is owning her brilliance like a boss. The Revel show highlighted how she's become an accomplished multi-instrumentalist — her arsenal includes her powerhouse voice, her toned thighs, her whipping hair, her Vaudevillian eyes, and of course, her wind machine. And now she's become even more adept at playing our emotions, too, eliciting Beatlemania screeches by revealing a mere glimpse of Blue Ivy during a video montage. She's unlocked the secret to balancing her super-human talent with über-humanizing rhetoric like another megastar who only requires one name: Oprah."

— Caryn Ganz, Spin

Caryn Ganz of Spin wrote: "Beyoncé is the greatest performer of her generation and she knows it well. Her Revel concerts were more Liza with a Z than MTV — predicated on nothing but the tour de force of its creator. Saturday night's two-hour show featured no gimmicks, no backing tracks, no hard-to-follow narratives, no whipped cream cannons. It was old school Vegas-style Entertainment with a capital E: singing, dancing, and charisma wrapped up in a few sparkly Ralph & Russo outfits." Dan DeLuca of Philadelphia Inquirer praised Beyoncé's singing with earnest commitment and impassioned intensity further writing that the concert was a "relentlessly entertaining, highly energetic two hours". Jim Farber of Daily News was positive about the show, praising the performance of the ballads as well as the up-tempo songs, adding that she was "shimmying, sashaying and gyrating like she had everything to prove." He further said, "Beyoncé didn't shirk on the razzle or the dazzle in this two-hour event. In fact, this run of shows featured the flashiest lighting, fiercest dancing and most animated theatrics of her starry career... The assurance of the performance, as well as the enormity of the production, makes it unlikely that Beyoncé's latest show will die with this weekend." Ben Ratliff of The New York Times commented that "The show lasted two hours and allowed a dip in the middle for ballads, but otherwise ran rampant, functioning as an almost continuous high point". Celia L. Smith of Essence magazine wrote that, "She sang, danced and put on a show like no other". A writer for Rap-Up noted that Beyoncé didn't miss a step during the choreography and added that "Sasha Fierce is alive and well". Writing that she didn't disappoint, a journalist of Black Entertainment Television described the concert as "phenomenal" further praising the high-energy performance of her up-tempo songs and adding that she "dazzled" her fans. The journalist added that "Though she made it look easy, keeping up to the beat of the vibrant tunes was no easy task" and marked it as "[the] pop queen's return to her throne". Dawn Fallik of The Wall Street Journal praised Beyoncé's dancing and voice during the show saying that they were in "enviable form". Rebecca Thomas of MTV News described the performances as a "spectacular fitting her [Beyoncé's] rising icon status".

Erika Ramirez of Billboard magazine noted that there were two highlights of the night, aside from the choreography and vocal prowess; the dynamic between Beyoncé and her fans and the video montages from her personal life. Kyle Anderson of Entertainment Weekly wrote that Beyoncé was in a "fighting shape, breezing through four nights of wickedly aggressive modern R&B" and added that the most "attention-grabbing" moments of the night were the covers of other artists that she performed during the concert. Chuck Darrow of the Philadelphia Media Network noted that "Beyonce and her small army of supporting singers, dancers and musicians... conjured an impressive onslaught of sight, sound and motion." He further noted that unlike Lady Gaga and Madonna who used "sartorial extremism" to call attention to themselves, "It is testament to Beyonce's star-power that her stage incandescent presence never allowed the visual pyrotechnics behind her or the hyperkinetic dancers beside her to rise above the peripheral." Praising the feminism showcased during the show, Tris McCall of The Star-Ledger wrote in his review that Beyoncé gave everything she had for the concert pulling them out as vigorously as she could. He further added "The star gave Ovation Hall exactly what it wanted, and left the new theater smoking. The problem for Revel now: following it up." In another review, he described the concert as "spellbinding", wrote that everything onstage was perfectly choreographed, down to the "goofy mid-song mugging" that added so much character to her performances. He concluded that no other pop artist sounds "quite as awake" as Beyoncé does.

Beyoncé's performance also received positive response from celebrities and fans. US First Lady Michelle Obama, who attended the show said, "Beyoncé stepped up in a way that so many of our celebrities and athletes are stepping up on behalf of this issue, so I love her to death and was glad to be out there moving my body with her." Governor of New Jersey Christopher J. Christie used his Twitter account to write that everything about the show was "great". Beyoncé's husband and rapper Jay-Z, also wrote on Twitter that Beyoncé was the "best performer in the world". A writer of Complex magazine further discussed his statements, "Sure, he's married to her... But upon further reflection, he just might have a point. What other artist out there gives the type of live performance she does on a nightly basis? Who can give you that incredible voice singing power ballads and up-tempo dance cuts—while dancing?... In a world with hotshots like Lady Gaga, legends like U2, and even Jay-Z and Kanye West's The Throne bodying stages worldwide, is Beyoncé best performer on earth?".

== Commercial performance ==
Tickets for the concerts were made available on April 6, 2012, 10 a.m. EST through Ticketmaster after an exclusive pre-sale one day earlier on Beyonce.com, Beyoncé's official website. Within one minute, all three shows were sold out. On May 7, 2012, an additional concert was scheduled for May 28, 2012 because of high demand. Tickets were sold in a similar fashion, with an exclusive pre-sale on Beyonce.com and a Ticketmaster general sale taking place on May 11, 2012, 10 a.m. EST and May 14, 10 a.m. EST respectively. The fourth date would eventually sell-out as well. Listed for sale at $95 – $495, ticket prices took a hike up to $1,700 through ticket resale companies like StubHub. According to Jim Farber of Daily News, the tickets were sold for high prices because the Revel Presents: Beyoncé Live was the only show by Beyoncé announced that year.

== Broadcasts and recordings ==
A sixty-second preview of the performance of "End of Time" at Revel, premiered online on Beyoncé's website on May 27, 2012. Jacob Moore of Complex magazine wrote that Beyoncé "prove[d] she's still got it" during the footage of the performance. A writer of Rap-Up commented that "Sasha Fierce busts out some ferocious moves with her female dancers". Footage of the concert was also used in Beyoncé's HBO documentary film, Life Is But a Dream, that aired on February 16, 2013. Gerrick D. Kennedy of the Los Angeles Times described the performances included in the film as "dazzling". A DVD from the concert titled Live in Atlantic City was released as a bonus disc with the home media release of the documentary on November 25, 2013. The DVD was available for pre-order on November 1, 2013.

== Opening act ==
- Luke James

== Set list ==
1. "End of Time"
2. "Love On Top"
3. "Get Me Bodied" / "Baby Boy"
4. "Crazy in Love"
5. "Diva"
6. "Naughty Girl"
7. "Party"
8. "Dance for You"
9. "Freakum Dress"
10. "I Care"
11. "Schoolin' Life"
12. "1+1"
13. "I Miss You"
14. "Resentment"
15. "If I Were a Boy" / "Ex-Factor"
16. "Flaws and All"
17. "Irreplaceable"
18. "Countdown"
19. "Jumpin', Jumpin'"
20. "Run the World (Girls)"
21. "Why Don't You Love Me"
22. "I Will Always Love You" / "Halo"

Encore

23. "Single Ladies (Put a Ring on It)"
