= Schoolin' Life =

Song by Beyoncé

from the album 4
- Recorded: 2011
- Studio: MSR Studios (New York City)
- Genre: R&B
- Length: 4:53
- Label: Columbia
- Songwriters: Beyoncé Knowles; Terius Nash; Shea Taylor; Carlos McKinney
- Producers: Beyoncé Knowles; The-Dream; Los Da Mystro

"Schoolin' Life" is a song that was recorded by American singer Beyoncé for the deluxe edition of her fourth studio album, 4 (2011). It was written by Beyoncé, Terius Nash, Shea Taylor as well as Carlos McKinney while production was handled by Beyoncé, The-Dream, and Los Da Mystro. Jordan Young, also known by his stage name DJ Swivel, mixed the song at New York's Jungle City Studios. Containing elements of disco and dance-pop music, "Schoolin' Life" is an uptempo R&B song, in which Beyoncé employs guttural vocals and uses her head voice. Having a retro nature, the song is built on a 1980s-inspired dance beat, and is instrumentally complete with old school synthesizers, drum kits, electric guitars, and horns.

Lyrically, the song features Beyoncé schooling everyone from their 20s to their 50s. She gets feisty as she reflects on lessons she learned in her own life and affirms that she has not certified as a teacher, preacher, or doctor, but is willing to perform their various duties regardless. "Schoolin' Life" was well received by contemporary music critics, who noted its aural resemblance to Prince's prime work, praised its production, and coined it as one of the catchiest upbeat songs Beyoncé has ever recorded. It appeared on several critics' lists of the best songs of 2011. Following the release of 4, "Schoolin' Life" charted at number 155 on the South Korean International Singles Chart. The song was used in the eighth season of the American television reality program and dance competition So You Think You Can Dance. It was part of Beyoncé's set list during her residency show Revel Presents: Beyoncé Live.

== Production and mixing ==
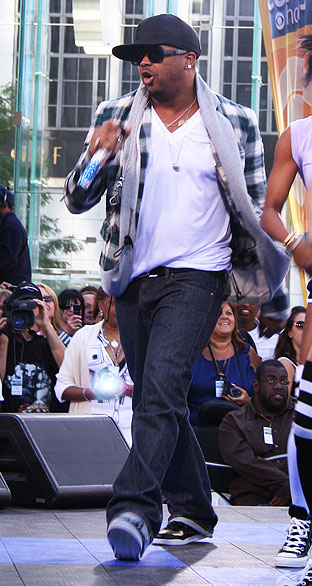
The-Dream (pictured) was one of the co-writers of "Schoolin' Life".

"Schoolin' Life" was written by Beyoncé, Terius Nash, Shea Taylor, and Carlos McKinney. Production was handled by Beyoncé, The-Dream, and Los Da Mystro. It was made available on the deluxe edition of 4, which was sold exclusively at Target until that edition was released to iTunes Stores on January 2, 2012. The deluxe edition consists of an additional two deluxe only tracks, "Dance for You" and "Lay Up Under Me" and three remixes of "Run the World (Girls)" (2011). Jordan Young aka DJ Swivel mixed the song at New York's Jungle City Studios. Describing "Schoolin' Life" as his favorite track on the album, Swivel told Sound on Sound that he was adamant about mixing the song:

I spent a lot of time after [Beyoncé] left the studio tightening up the rough. In fact, I'm sure she let me mix it just because I loved the track so much! I mixed this in the fantastic penthouse room in Jungle City. This record was, of course, about the vocals — but a lot of it was about the production elements too. Everything had to be audible; there's some interesting percussion, and the hook had to feel nice and big.

Around 100 tracks were used on "Schoolin' Life"; they were roughly split with 50 for the music and 50 for the vocals. As stated by Swivel, musically the aim of the mix was to take a large number of tracks and create a perfect balance. So, he used Waves’ Metaflanger on the percussion and some of the snares, and spent some time EQ’ing. Swivel explained that there was much parallel processing on the lead vocal. The lead-vocal bus was muted to a second bus, and one of them was entirely crushed on a 50:1 compression ratio which was totally limited and with a very low threshold. He elaborated, "It creates a very gritty distorted sound in there, really low to taste, and it fills in the lead vocal very nicely. The crushed vocal runs quietly underneath."

After completing the lead vocals, Swivel decided to rework the 1980s sound on the snares as they were originally very tight. He therefore added a gated reverb for the snap sound which was long and drawn‑out snap sound. He also subbed in an additional kick underneath to add some real oomph to the bottom. Owing to the work Swivel had accomplished during production, the final mix took only a few hours. He said: "There were a lot of tracks, but I just enjoyed it, to be honest. I knew how I wanted it to sound, and it was pretty much the last song we cut; a lot of the mixing was nailed in the production as well, which helped. Dream did a great job producing this track." The bar one guitar track of "Schoolin' Life" was entirely programmed. Similarly, the live drum section in the hook was actually done with programmed drums. Once the mixing was over, Swivel's impression were as follows:

['Schoolin' Life] absolutely had to have its own space. There are percussion elements and a few random sounds in there too, plus the nice guitar track, but certainly the main challenge was for all of these tracks to be well balanced and individually audible. It really is very easy to overlook something like that, which can potentially completely change the sound of a record.

== Composition and lyrical interpretation ==
"Schoolin' Life" is an uptempo R&B, which contains elements of disco and dance-pop. Built on a 1980s-inspired beat, the song's instrumentation includes old school synthesizers, 1980s-sounding drum kits wailing electric guitars, and horns. Music critics, including Jamie Peck of MTV noted that "Schoolin' Life" was inspired by the prime work of Prince, particularly because of its lyrical content, the instruments used, and Beyoncé's style of singing on it. Lyrically, the song finds Beyoncé detailing her experiences as she was growing up. In the first verse, she employs guttural vocals to address many life lessons to "20-somethings", "30-somethings", "40-somethings", and "50-somethings". Beyoncé warns them against some consequences, affirming "time really moves fast" and that growing up fast will leave them wanting more. Beyoncé also talks about still excelling in a world where parents try to shield everything, "Mom and dad tried to hide the world / Said the world's just too big for a little girl / Eyes wide open can't you see / I had my first heels by the age of 13".

"Schoolin' Life"
"Schoolin' Life" is an R&B song, on which Beyoncé adopts guttural vocals as she confesses that she is great at writing physical love letters, before asking: "Who needs a degree when you're schoolin' life?

In the chorus, Beyoncé gives listeners a flashback to her friskier days and admits that she is certified neither as a teacher, a preacher nor a doctor, but is willing to perform their various duties regardless. She also sings, "I'm great at writing physical love letters", and "I'm a freak, all day all night". After asking, "Who needs a degree when you're schoolin' life?", Beyoncé echoes, "Oh oh oh oh oh oh woah oh oh". In the second verse, she continues to sing about the ins and outs of life to the "pretty somethings", "sexy somethings", "bitter somethings", and "little somethings": "Living in a fastlane, see you when you crash babe", "That body ain’t always gonna get you out of everything", and "Stop living in regret, it’s not over yet". In the bridge, she commands, "Make your life what you decide / Baby, party till the fire marshal shuts this sucker down". The song ends with Beyoncé giving one her final lessons, "Don’t stop running until it’s finished — it’s up to you, the rest is unwritten".

== Critical reception ==
"Schoolin' Life" received positive reviews. Jamie Peck of MTV described "Schoolin' Life" as "[a] feisty lesson in fun... It's the perfect soundtrack for dancing on a fire escape or... playing in a busted open fire hydrant... Whatever, it's hot!". He concluded that Prince would be proud of the song's musical style and lyrical content. John Mitchell of the same publication found the song to be single-worthy. Choosing "Schoolin' Life" as one of the three best tracks on 4, Tyrone S. Reid of Blogcritics commented that the song offers a proper lesson in how "to make the old and new schools boogie together". He also noted that it is reminiscent of Prince's work. Ryan Dombal of Pitchfork Media viewed the song as an irresistible Prince tribute, which he considered to be much more motivational than "I Was Here". He called "Schoolin' Life" as one "among the proper album's finest moments". Daniel Koren of PMA noted that the song recalls some of The-Dream's most Prince-esque tracks, "Fast Car" and "Yamaha". Ian Walker of AbsolutePunk wrote:

'I Miss You' and bonus track 'Schoolin' Life' both showcase opposite sides of that magnificent decade's musical spectrum. The former is a stripped down track carried mostly by a hollow beat and dismal synthesizers, allowing Beyoncé and her morosely beautiful voice center stage ... The latter picks up the pace, peppered liberally with old-school horns and crashes. Beyoncé details her experiences growing up, but parallels can be drawn to the maturation she's going through on this very album. More than any song, 'Schoolin' Life' literally oozes confidence, providing an endearing edge to an already catchy track.

Casey Hamilton of the Boston website Gather wrote that credit for the song's "retro-radical nature" goes to producer The-Dream, but it is Beyoncé herself who "truly delivers the shock value, managing to make a lightly introspective, loosely insightful, and largely entertaining tune", before adding that it contains the sexiest lyrical content she has ever attempted. Hamilton concluded that Beyoncé's vocals effectively match the funky and fun vibe of "Schoolin' Life", and concluded that the latter showcases "a side of the singer that is nice to see and even nicer to hear". Duncan Cooper of The Fader magazine wrote that the song is "lyrically inspired, tough as hell and easily the best thing" on 4. Danielle Cheesman of MSN Music commented that "'Schoolin' Life' steals the whole entire spotlight", further noting that it channels the "trademark friskiness" of Prince. He commended how Beyoncé "unleashes her inner (and innate) freak singing". Cheesman concluded "how this isn't on the original is beyond me", before adding that there "maybe one extra single [on the deluxe edition of 4]".

=== Recognition ===
The Guardian's critic Tom Ewing ranked "Schoolin' Life" at number nine on his list of The 10 Best Tracks of 2011. Priya Elan of NME placed the song at number five on her list of the 10 Best Pop Songs Of The Year, writing that it is the "most excellent, time-defying look at Beyonce's life so far". He added that if viewed from a stylistic perspective, "Schoolin' Life" may not have fit with 4 mature tone, but as a stand-alone track "it was one of the most fun of the year". The staff members of the website Popdust ranked "Schoolin' Life" as the 87th best song of 2011, commending Beyoncé for having pastiched it together "from decades-musty synths and rip-roar over it until it sounds completely current with a wink and a smirk."

== Live performances ==
In May 2012, Beyoncé performed "Schoolin Life" during her revue show Revel Presents: Beyoncé Live in Revel Atlantic City. The performance of the song was placed on the album Live in Atlantic City (2013) chronicling the concerts. It was previewed on Beyoncé's official YouTube page on November 25, 2013. A writer of Vibe magazine felt that the laser light show from the performance "brighten[ed] up Atlantic City". E! News' Natalie Finn praised Beyoncé for "tearing it up" onstage during the performance of the song with her backup dancers adding that her fans "are in for quite the education".

== Chart performance ==
For the week ending July 30, 2011, "Schoolin' Life" debuted at number 155 on the South Korean International Singles Chart, selling 4,006 digital downloads.

Chart (2011)	Peak position
South Korea Gaon International Chart	155

== Certifications ==
Certifications for "Schoolin' Life"
Region	Certification	Certified units/sales
United States (RIAA)	Gold	500,000^{‡}
^{‡} Sales+streaming figures based on certification alone.
