= Party (Beyoncé song) =

Song by Beyoncé

Single by Beyoncé featuring André 3000

from the album 4
- Released: August 30, 2011
- Recorded: 2010
- Studio: Avex Honolulu (Honolulu); MSR (New York City); Strong Mountain (Stone Mountain)
- Genre: R&B
- Length: 4:05
- Label: Parkwood; Columbia
- Songwriters: Beyoncé Knowles; Kanye West; Jeff Bhasker; André Benjamin
- Producers: Beyoncé Knowles; Kanye West

Beyoncé singles chronology
"Lift Off" (2011)	"Party" (2011)	"Love On Top" (2011)

André 3000 singles chronology
"Dedication to My Ex (Miss That)" (2011)	"Party" (2011)	"Play the Guitar" (2011)

Audio video
- "Party" on YouTube

Remix single cover
- Remix featuring J. Cole cover

J. Cole singles chronology
"Can't Get Enough" (2011)	"Party" (remix) (2011)	"Nobody's Perfect" (2012)

Music video
- "Party" (remix) on YouTube

"Party" is a song recorded by American singer Beyoncé for her fourth studio album, 4 (2011). It features guest vocals from American rapper André 3000 and background vocals from Kanye West and Consequence, and was released by Columbia Records as the fourth single from 4 on August 30, 2011. The song was written by Kanye West, Jeff Bhasker, Beyoncé, Dexter Mills, Douglas Davis and Ricky Walters and produced by Beyoncé and West and co-produced by Bhasker.

A midtempo R&B song, "Party" exhibits elements of the 1980s funk and soul music, and samples the 1985 song "La Di Da Di" performed by Doug E. Fresh and MC Ricky D. It recalls the work of New Edition, Prince, and Teena Marie among others. Built on an 808-retro beat, multi-tracked harmonies, and a smooth groove, the song's instrumentation includes slow-bouncing synthesizers, keyboard tones, and drums. In his rap verses, André 3000 references milk and gets philosophical about his own career.

"Party" was acclaimed by contemporary music critics, who praised André 3000's verses, as well as the production handled by West and Beyoncé's emphatic, yet sensual vocals. It was nominated for Best Rap/Sung Collaboration at the 54th Grammy Awards. Following the release of 4, "Party" charted at number 19 on the South Korea Gaon International Singles Chart. It debuted on the US Hot R&B/Hip-Hop Songs chart in July 2011, and peaked at number 2 on the chart for three consecutive weeks. The song reached number 50 on the US Billboard Hot 100 chart based on radio support. "Party" was part of Beyoncé's set list for her 4 Intimate Nights with Beyoncé and the Revel Presents: Beyoncé Live residency shows.

The official remix was released worldwide for digital download on October 24, 2011 with vocals from American rapper J. Cole, replacing those of André 3000, and an accompanying music video for "Party" was shot in New Jersey and was directed by Beyoncé with Cole also replacing André 3000 in the video.

== Background and development ==
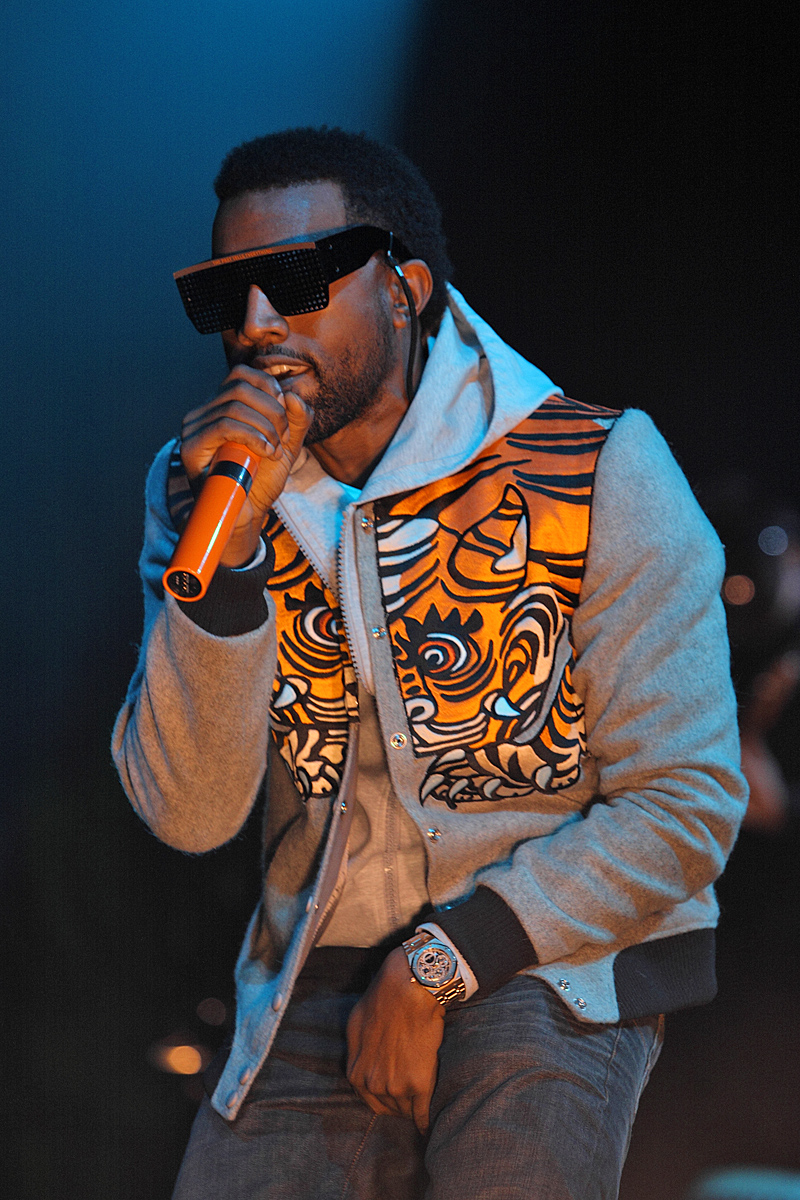
Kanye West (pictured) coined the phrase "swagu" in "Party".

"Party" was written by Kanye West, Jeff Bhasker, Beyoncé Knowles, André Lauren Benjamin, Dexter Mills, Douglas Davis and Ricky Walters. Production was handled by Beyoncé, West, and Bhasker. "Party" was the first song on which Beyoncé worked for her-then upcoming album, 4. In May 2010, Jordan Young aka DJ Swivel started working with Beyoncé at Rock The Mic Studio in New York City. They initially recorded the beginning stages of "Party" to see what kind of a working relationship might form. Young was introduced to Beyoncé by Omar Grant, who was an A&R at Epic Records and used to work with Destiny's Child. Beyoncé was satisfied with Young's work and commended him for being "a fast engineer". Beyoncé then decided to give him the opportunity to work with her through the whole production and recording processes of her album.

She later told Gabriel Alvarez of Complex magazine that she was very happy and keen to work with Kanye West who handled the production of "Party". This was because West's single "Runaway" (2010) drove her to the edge of tears the first time she heard. She further said: "The fact that he's belting out his pain, his confusion, and his anger, with no pre-written lyrics, was so moving. He's singing his heart out for five minutes. He is so vulnerable. I love when an artist can be so honest." On May 25, 2011, it was revealed by Rap-Up that American rapper André 3000, who had been keeping his features to a minimum in recent years, would appear as a featuring artist on fifth song featured on the track-listing of Beyoncé's then fourth upcoming studio album, 4. This was the only collaboration present on the final track-list of the record. Later on June 4, 2011, it was revealed that "Party" samples "La Di Da Di" (1985) as performed by Doug E. Fresh and the Get Fresh Crew featuring MC Ricky D., and written by Douglas Davis and Ricky Walters. The original record contains the lyrics, "La di da di, we like to party", which the songwriters included on "Party".

On June 6, 2011, "Party" leaked on the internet followed by the whole album, three weeks prior to its official release date, which was scheduled for June 28, 2011. Speaking of his collaboration with Beyoncé, André 3000 said: "I've always felt Beyoncé was one of the best performers of our time, so to collaborate with her was an honor and a pleasure." "Party" was added to United States urban contemporary radio by Columbia Records on August 30, 2011.

== Composition and lyrical interpretation ==
"Party"
A 24-second sample of "Party", which is reminiscent of the music Knowles was making with Destiny's Child in the 1990s. The 1980s musical styles heavily influenced its instrumentation, which includes 1980s slow-bouncing synthesizers, bubbly 1980s keyboard tones, and a vintage-sounding drum machine.

"Party" is a mid-paced R&B song that exhibits elements of funk and soul music. It is written in the key of B♭ major and set in common time with the sequence of Cm_{7}–Dm_{7}–F_{7(sus)}–G_{9(sus)}–Cm_{7}–Dm_{7}. According to David Amidon of PopMatters, the song's music "is largely reminiscent of late 1980s diva histrionics"; it is built on scooping and gliding multi-tracked 1990 girl-group harmonies, midtempo bounces, a 808-retro beat and a 1980s-style smooth hip hop groove. The instrumentation of "Party" consists of slow-bouncing synthesizers, bubbly keyboard tones, and a drum machine.

Gil Kaufman of MTV News commented that the synthesizers and drum machine used in "Party" create a groove reminiscent of "a New Jack Swing seduction." Jon Caramainca of The New York Times wrote that the production of "Party" recalls the early work of New Edition. James Reed of The Boston Globe commented that its music arrangement sounds like a parody by The Lonely Island or Flight of the Conchords. Roberts Randall of the Los Angeles Times found that "Party" sounds like a half-speed remix of a Human League song, and Kevin O'Donnell of Spin magazine found the song to be reminiscent of Prince in his 1980s prime. Priya Elan of NME commented that "Party" is the first indication that 4 was influenced by the likes of Teena Marie.

Lyrically, "Party" features Beyoncé as the female protagonist "in the mood for some loving" as she references to a get-together for two persons. West rhymes about "swag sauce" and "swagu" in the introductory lines, "You a bad girl, your friends bad too / You got the swag sauce, you're drippin' Swagu", before passing the torch to Beyoncé, who begins to sing the first verse slowly and steadily, "I may be young but I'm ready / To give you all my love / I told my girls you can get it / Don't slow it down, just let it go / So in love / I'll give it all away / Just don't tell nobody tomorrow". In the chorus lines, she harmonizes over the sample from "La Di Da Di", "Cause tonight's the night that I give you everything / Music knocking until the morning light / 'Cause we like to party". In the second verse, Beyoncé belts out "in a thick stack of smooth, layered vocals". After chanting the chorus for a second time, André 3000 surfaces around the 2:15 mark with "some very naughty references" to milk on the verses he raps, "... another homeboy, that nigga named Cheese / Fuck wit' me baby, I make it milk 'til it drip down yo' knees", before switching gears altogether and getting philosophical about his own career, "Kiddo say he looks up to me, this just makes me feel old / Never thought that we could become someone else's hero / Man, we were just in the food court eating our gyros", and finally adopting a "multi-syllabic tongue twister" to rap some of the finishing lines. The song runs out with Beyoncé reiterating the lines, "Cause we like to party, hey, hey, hey, hey, hey", and West then reprises the opening lines.

== Critical reception ==
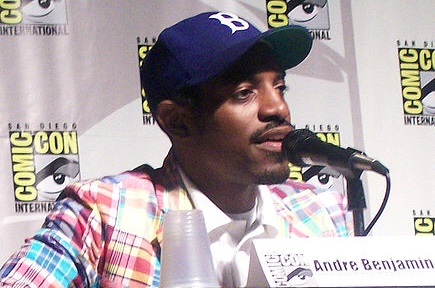
André 3000 (pictured), whose rhymes were described as "a blue moon, rare and pretty amazing" by Erika Ramirez of Billboard magazine.

Matthew Perpetua of Rolling Stone appreciated André 3000's performance and the song itself, writing: "André 3000 is sharp and effortlessly charismatic on his rapped verse, but the real attraction here is the track itself." Similarly, David Amidon of PopMatters commented that the song features "one of those rare 'look how effortless rapping is for me'." This was echoed by Ryan Dombal of Pitchfork Media, who wrote that "[4's] carefree retro sensibility pops up on three more highlights, including 'Party', which combines a pitch-perfect André 3000 guest verse, a Slick Rick sample, [...] while its bounce provides prime summer barbecue background." Rich Juzwiak of The Village Voice was also positive: "'Party' sounds right out of The SOS Band's catalog (its plodding tempo is the only thing that lets you know she isn't quoting a particularly poetic, desperately meth-seeking craigslist m4m ad [...])". Jon Caramainca of The New York Times wrote that Beyoncé sings the song "in her best impression of naughtiness." Chris Coplan of Consequence of Sound praised the minimal production and simplistic lyrics of "Party" further describing the song as being as "simple as a Beyoncé song gets: a low-key, synth-y beat paired with inspired vocals by Beyoncé and a killer, fluid verse by Mr. Benjamin [André 3000]."

Cameron Adams of the Herald Sun called "Party" the most throwaway moment on 4. Adam Markovitz of Entertainment Weekly wrote that "the promisingly named 'Party' [...] turns out to be a slow-jam invitation to an after-work mixer with light refreshments." Thomas Conner of the Chicago Sun-Times complimented the "scooping, gliding multi-tracked harmonies that almost make moot the idea of a Destiny's Child reunion." Gil Kaufman of MTV News was also positive, writing that "[...] unlike the at-points frantic 'Run the World (Girls)' [Party] takes its time, lyrically and musically, with Beyoncé luxuriating over her vocals and singing about the beauty of nice and slow." Describing "Party" as "a proudly retro slice of R&B", James Reed of The Boston Globe wrote that the song is "an irresistible summer jam that I haven't been able to stop humming for a week straight." Jim Farber of Daily News echoed Reed's sentiments, writing that "Party" would surely be "a top-down anthem for months to come." Similarly, Joanne Dorken of MTV UK described "Party" as a "dance-floor filler ... with that Sasha Fierce edge", before adding that is bound to be a "monster hit" and is a "stand out tune on the album". Ricky Schweitzer of One Thirty BPM also applauded "Party", writing:

The majority of 4 consists of mid-tempo pieces, but unlike the filler that might have occupied this pacing on previous albums, many of this album’s greatest strengths lie in this realm. Perhaps best exemplifying this spirit is the André 3000 and Kanye West assisted, 'Party' in which Beyoncé relaxes into a beat that, while not be easy to grind to, still works perfectly as a party anthem. Beyoncé reminds us that a party is not only meant for dancing. It is a place where you go to enjoy the company of others and oftentimes, that involves real human conversation and interaction. Echoing this sentiment, André’s verse is tranquilized from his customarily rapid-fire delivery to a drawl more reminiscent of Lil’ Wayne than his traditional work with Outkast. 'Party' like much of 4, is a conversation, and André 3000 wants to be heard.

However, Matthew Horton of BBC Online viewed "Party" as one of the "less successful interruptions" on 4. Similarly, Embling of Tiny Mix Tapes gave the song a mixed review, writing: "[...] the less said about the phrase 'swag goo' the better; 'Party', the song on which those unfortunate words appear — Kanye West providing that unfortunate pun — is otherwise wonderful, but yet some errors are too grievous to forgive." Andy Kellman from Allmusic stated, "[...] What's most surprising is that a song titled 'Party' quickly settles into a low-watt groove and remains there." Bill Lamb from About.com added, "Kanye West and Andre 3000 provide interesting vocal color for 'Party' but the song itself is just a variant on the 'this is my night to be bad' theme." A negative review came from Al Shipley of The Village Voice who wrote that "Party" and "Best Thing I Never Had" were "among the album's worst and most unrepresentative songs".

On The Village Voice's year-end Pazz & Jop singles list, "Party" was ranked at number 177 and 439 in 2011 and 2012 respectively. The writers of Rap-Up included the song at number 8 on their list of 10 Best Songs of 2011. "Party" was nominated for Best Rap/Sung Collaboration at the 54th Grammy Awards, which was held on February 12, 2012, but lost to Kanye West's "All of the Lights". At the 2013 ASCAP Rhythm & Soul Awards "Party" was one of the songs to win in the category for Award-Winning R&B/Hip-Hop Songs.

== Chart performance ==
Without being released as a single, the album version "Party" debuted at number 29 on the South Korea Gaon International Singles Chart for the week ending July 2, 2011, selling 17,460 digital downloads. The following week, it sold 17,995 downloads, which enabled it to ascend to number 19 where it peaked. The album version also debuted at number 90 on the US Hot R&B/Hip-Hop Songs chart issue dated July 21, 2011. The following week, "Party" moved to number 72 on the chart, and one week later, it climbed to number 57. For the week ending September 10, 2011, "Party" moved from number 55 to number 50 on the Hot R&B/Hip-Hop Songs chart. 31 US urban radios added "Party" to the playlist for the week ending October 1, 2011. As a result, "Party" was the most played song on US urban radios, gaining 517 spins in seven days, as reported by the Nielsen Broadcast Data Systems (BDS) urban airplay chart issued dated October 8, 2011. Subsequently, the song received the airplay greatest gainer title and moved from number 33 to number 20 on the Hot R&B/Hip-Hop Songs chart. The following week, "Party" debuted at number 71 on the US Radio Songs chart and subsequently moved to number 16 on the Hot R&B/Hip-Hop Songs chart.

For the week ending October 1, 2011, the album version of "Party" debuted at number 25 on the US Bubbling Under Hot 100 Singles chart. After two weeks, it ascended from number 11 to number 4 on the chart. For the week ending October 22, 2011, "Party" debuted at number 95 on the US Billboard Hot 100 chart. It also moved to number 9 on the Hot R&B/Hip-Hop Songs chart, receiving the airplay gainer title for the second non-consecutive time. "Party" escalated to number 87 on the Hot 100 chart and to number 7 on the Hot R&B/Hip-Hop Songs chart issued dated October 29, 2011. For the same week ending, Nielsen Broadcast Data Systems reported that "Party" was the most played song on Urban radios for the second non-consecutive time, gaining 464 spins in seven days. It ascended to number 5 on the Hot R&B/Hip-Hop Songs chart and to number 75 on the Hot 100 chart for the week ending November 5, 2011. "Party" surged to number 57 on the Hot 100, climbing 18 places, for the week ending November 12, 2011. For the week ending November 19, 2011, it further ascended to 54 on the Hot 100 chart and moved from number 5 to number 4 on the Hot R&B/Hip-Hop Songs chart.

For the week ending November 26, 2011, "Party" remained at number 54 on the Hot 100 chart and climbed to number 2 on the Hot R&B/Hip-Hop Songs chart. The following, Nielsen Broadcast Data Systems reported that "Party" reached the top spot of the BDS Urban National airplay chart, having amassed 4862 spins, which transitioned into 31.288 million listener impressions. It later peaked at number 50 on the Hot 100 chart and maintained its high point of number 2 on the Hot R&B/Hip-Hop Songs chart for four consecutive weeks.

== Remix ==
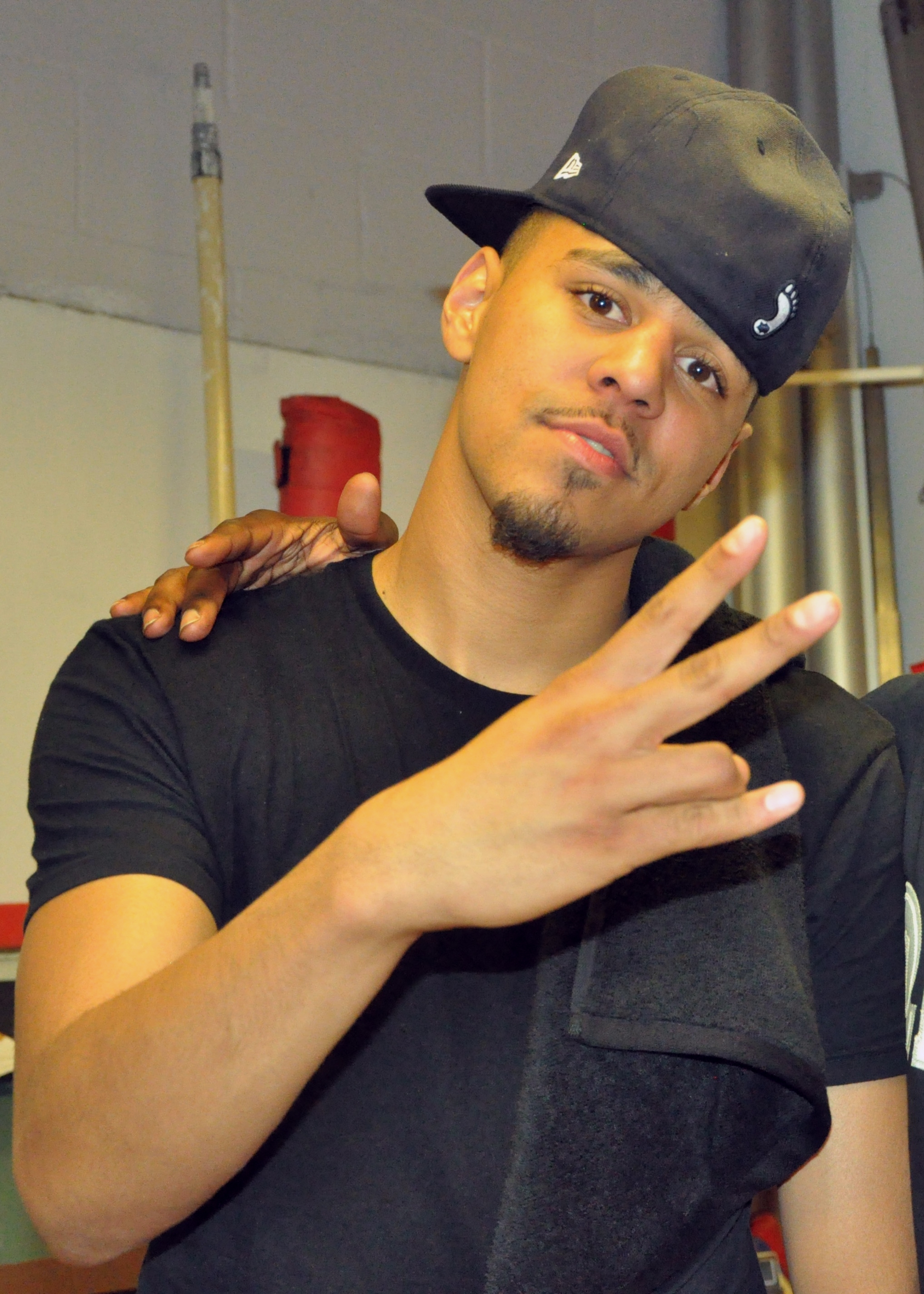
Andre 3000's verse is supplanted on the remix by a different verse from J.Cole (Pictured).

It was reported on October 8, 2011, that Cole would feature on the official remix of "Party". It premiered online on October 21, 2011 and its cover art was unveiled the same day. The remix of "Party" was released as a digital download on October 24, 2011; as a single it was released in the United States and several other European countries. It was not made available for purchase in Oceania and Germany, among others. Cole's verse, which replaces André 3000's from the original, is much shorter; all other elements of the remix are identical to the original. In his verse, Cole thanks God and Ice Cube for Friday, references Sade and Petey Pablo and name-drops the Bugatti brand.

"Party"
A 24 second sample of the remix featuring Cole's verse.

During an interview with WWKX (106.3 MHz FM "Hot 106") Rise & Grind Morning Show, Cole revealed that he was originally supposed to appear on the album version and that Beyoncé later enlisted him when she was ready to release "Party" as a single. He also explained why his verse was cut short and recalled his "unforgettable" experience of working with Beyoncé:

You know how many verses I did for that song. I did a version of that before her album [4] even came out. I did two verses. I love these verses too, but they ended up going with André's verse and André killed it. [...] Then [Beyoncé] reached out to me and she wanted me to get on the remix. I did two more verses. Out of the second set that I did, she picked the first verse. But my second verse, I just gotta say for the record… It was just too long, I think she was looking for something shorter and more to the point. [...] It's just a blessing to even be able to work with [Beyoncé]. I'm on my defensive rapper, like yo man. When you follow in André's 3000's shoes, you're expected to really go in. Just the fact to even be on the song with her and shoot the video with her and just be in her presence. She's such a hard working, incredible artist. I’ll never forget that day we shot the video, I'll never forget being able to be on that song, and hopefully we got more as time goes on. [...].

Andrew Martin of Prefix Magazine complimented the remix stating: "[The remix] might replace André 3000's typically great guest feature with one from J. Cole, but hey, anyone can sound good over this beat. And not only that, but Cole's vocals, however brief, are a welcome complement." Making reference to its music video, Entertainment Weekly's Erin Strecker commented: "I'm assuming it was shot mid-summer, which is when this really should have been put out. Releasing this track at the end of October seems like an odd choice, as the video involves a grillout and trailer-park pool party that would have sparkled mid-July." The remix was nominated in the category for Best Collaboration at the 2012 BET Awards. For the week ending November 5, 2011, "Party" debuted at number two on the South Korean International Singles Chart, selling 85,143 digital downloads. It became the seventy third best-selling single in South Korea in 2011.

== Music video ==
=== Filming and release ===
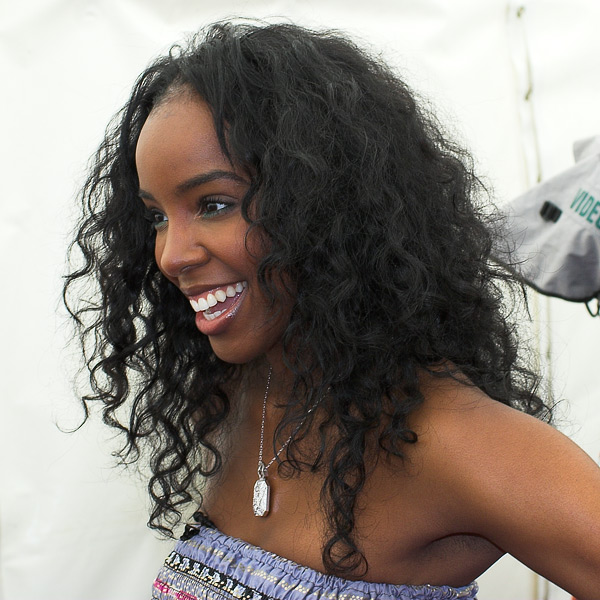
Kelly Rowland (pictured) makes a cameo appearance.

The music video for "Party" was directed by Beyoncé and Alan Ferguson. As reported by Rap-Up, Beyoncé filmed the clip in the Oakdale Mobile Home Park in South Brunswick Township, New Jersey, on August 2, 2011. The video shoot called for multiple flashy fashions, a red muscle car, and colorfully dressed dancers. Solange Knowles, Beyoncé's younger sister, and Kelly Rowland, former Destiny's Child member, both made cameos. Rowland elaborated a bit about her role in the video in an interview with NeonLimelight: "I'm just doing a cameo. We just had a really good time [...] While filming the video, we noticed that we were doing certain stuff that we used to do as kids. We kinda felt a little goofy for a second, so we stopped. But we just had a good time.". Model Shaun Ross also makes a cameo in the video.

As the video uses the remix featuring Cole, André 3000 did not appear in the video; Cole, who replaced him, shot his cameo on October 7, 2011; Beyoncé also came to the set that day to film extra scenes with Cole. A 32-second preview of the music video was shown on BET's 106 & Park on October 24, 2011. The retro-themed visuals showed Beyoncé throwing a backyard party with her friends. Wearing bikinis, girls, including rapper Dai Burger, were lying in the sun and splashing in the pool as Beyoncé's sister Solange was working the turntables. Cole swept through in his blue Bugatti car to join the old school parties. Although it was reported that the full music video would premiere on October 25, 2011, it premiered on October 26 during an episode of 106 & Park and on Beyoncé's Vevo account. "Party" is the sixth video released from 4.

On November 22, 2011, the behind-the-scenes footage of the video was leaked online. In the footage, her stylist said that the inspiration for the video was "trailer-trash, ghetto fabulous, out-there, [and] edgy." During the footage Beyoncé said "I like this video. It's no choreography, no pressure. All I have to do is party and have a good time." She also revealed that the video is supposed to reflect her simplistic childhood, adding: "Growing up, I had really amazing parents and I had a great childhood. We went from nicer homes to being in apartments with our lights cutting off. It didn't matter where we were 'cause we had love and we had so much fun. It's great when you don't have as much how you improvise and you have more fun."

=== Synopsis ===
Criticized by James Dinh of MTV News, "[The music video for] 'Party' takes viewers back to an old-school backyard celebration full of colorful bikinis, freestyle dancing and a few familiar faces. Throughout the video, [Beyoncé] lets loose, playing a sort of party host. If she is not lounging in beach chairs, she is dancing among her friends or mowing the lawn." The video is centered around a trailer park hood and a subsequent soiree. It starts with a dog barking behind a fencing, followed by multiple intercut scenery, which includes two men engaged in a conversation, a woman leaning against a car, a little girl riding a bicycle and a saucepan caught in fire. Then, Beyoncé appears, dressed in bright colored as well as flashy outfits, wearing neon-colored, oval-shaped nails, and bright-colored lipstick. She is grilling in a skillet while one of her neighbors drinks from a hose. As she sings, looking into the camera, she highlights and plays with her hair. The action shifts from the double wide to a sunny summer backyard BBQ, where Beyoncé and her friends dance as Solange is DJing. This is followed by scenes of Beyoncé, floating in an above ground pool while singing and entertaining her guests. She is wearing a pink one-piece swimsuit, jeweled drop earrings and her hair looks crimped. Other girls lie in the sun and splash in the pool as Solange works the turntables.

Once outside the pool, Beyoncé, now in a ruffled blue and white bikini, is sitting on a chaise longue and licking a lollipop. Beyoncé then shifts to another chaise longue where she relaxes with a bowl of snack food in her hand. Now wearing sunglasses, a black butterfly turban, and a furry green vest, Beyoncé lounges on a plastic chair around an inflatable pool toys next to lawn flamingos and beer bottle-filled kiddie pools. As she sings, she throws some snack food towards the camera. Cole arrives in a blue Bugatti car to rap his verse in the parking lot. In a different scene, he sits on the bumper of a truck with Beyoncé on his left hand-side. They swing by the parties once they hit the hotel room for a short after-hours. Later, Beyoncé is seen doing a retouch of her makeup, sitting on the toilet. Kelly Rowland and Beyoncé are then shown, propped up against a red muscle car. Beyoncé wears in a canary bird style, yellow feather coat while Rowland wears a short maroon dress, and they are both seen smiling and dancing. Beyoncé then mows the lawn and the video ends when Rowland and Beyoncé smiling into the camera.

=== Reception ===
Marc Hogan of Spin magazine wrote that the video for "Party", isn't "Beyoncé's best video recently" adding that it had a lot of competition. A writer of Daily Mirror compared the set in the video with American series Baywatch and described Beyoncé's look as "sexy". Amanda Dobbins of New York magazine wrote that Beyoncé "host[s] a trailer-park fiesta in crazy technicolor fur getups and still look[s] amazing." Matt Donnelly of Los Angeles Times concluded: "In a glorious mess of fanny packs, headpieces, blender drinks, dice-throwing and dance circles, Beyonce reminds us that even without elaborate choreography, high fashion or cinematic elements she brings one heck of a party." That was somehow echoed by Entertainment Weekly's Erin Strecker who wrote that "Beyoncé isn't dancing this time around. Instead, she's strutting her stuff with neon makeup and costumes straight out of the Day-Glo '90s." Nakisha Williams of BET praised the "flashy looks Beyoncé chose to get her 'Party' on". Sarah Anne Hughes of The Washington Post praised the "pretty glamorous trailer park affair" and the party in the video saying that it's a "party you wish you were invited to." A writer of VH1 found a "delectable, candy-colored, bling-adorned party scene" with "retro-ghetto fab outfits" and a very simple throughline.

Marina Galperina of AOL's The Boombox said "from her neon nails, scintillating bathing suits, sequined mini-dresses, big hair, bright make-up to the sexy shimmying of her still slim physique, all eyes are on Beyonce as she serenades a promise to 'give it all away, just don't tell nobody tomorrow.'" Jenna Gregory of Marie Claire wrote that Beyoncé shows an "amazing bod in parely-there clothes which you definitely wouldn't find in the maternity section." Chris Coplan of Consequence of Sound found a 1980s vibe similar to the song's sound, adding that the only thing the "family affair is missing is Jay-Z wearing sunscreen on his nose and a shirt from Tommy Bahama." Ted Maider of the same publication, noted that Beyoncé "adds some luster to the rusty surroundings, shining through as the beautiful pop icon that she has become. It just goes to show it doesn't matter where Beyonce is, or where her music is playing, she can turn any spot into a rager." A writer of OK! said that Beyoncé "don[s] an unbelievable amount of cool oufits, all of which we need in our lives." Rap-Up commented "Summer may be over, but Beyoncé gives us another reason to celebrate with the vibrant video" adding "This is one party you won't want to miss." Andrew Martin of Prefix Magazine described "Party"'s video as a "fittingly shindig-centric affair." Jessica Misener of The Huffington Post praised the fashion used in the video saying that Beyoncé had a lot of "chic looks". Another writer of the same publication praised the decision to make a simple party set. He further described the video as "a gorgeous boast of her beauty as well as a helpful reminder that, even in these down economic times, one can party like a rock star." At the 2012 BET Awards, Beyoncé and Alan Ferguson won in the category for Video Director of the Year after they collaborated on the music video for "Party".

== Live performances ==
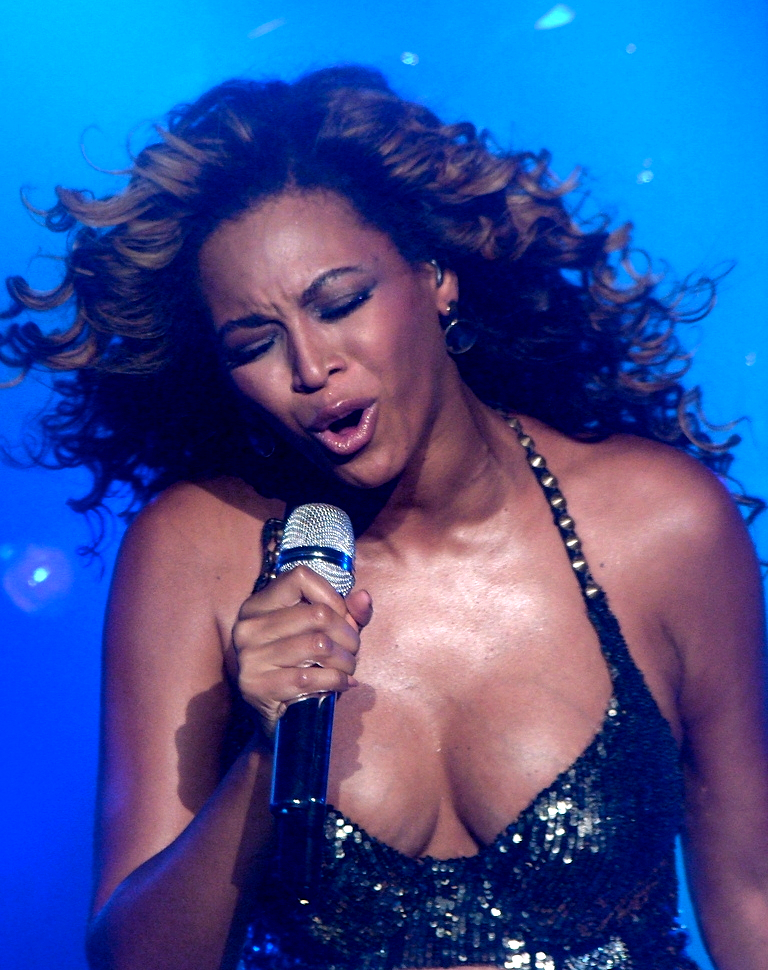
Beyoncé performing during the 4 Intimate Nights with Beyoncé revue.

Beyoncé performed the song live for first time on August 14, 2011, during her 4 Intimate Nights with Beyoncé in Roseland Ballroom, New York City. Wearing a gold dress, she performed the song in front of 3,500 people and she was backed by her all-female band and her backing singers, called the "Mamas". Erika Ramirez of Billboard magazine commented that "[Beyoncé] slow-winded to 'Party' as the crowd swayed their arms back and forth and stretched out the 'y' to every other verse." Jody Rosen of Rolling Stone said that the live performance of "Party" was "beatific and lovely."

Jon Caramanica of The New York Times, who apparently had not received "Party" positively while reviewing 4, however wrote that "[Beyoncé] is an outrageously nimble entertainer, enough so that it compensated for this album’s awkward or halfhearted choices: the too-goofy Kanye West hook on 'Party'." Yolanda Sangweni of Essence magazine stated that "on songs like 'Rather Die Young' and 'Party', [Beyoncé] reminds us her vocal chops are what got her here." Brad Wete of Entertainment Weekly stated that "Party" was among the several highlights of the show. Jocelyn Vena of MTV News concluded that "it was [Beyoncé's] ability to throw a party during faster jams like 'Party', 'Countdown', 'End of Time' and 'Run the World (Girls)' that put on full display her range as a performer, dancing and singing live the entire night." During the ITV special A Night With Beyoncé which aired on December 4 in the United Kingdom, Beyoncé performed "Party" to a selected crowd of fans.

In May 2012, Beyoncé performed "Party" during her Revel Presents: Beyoncé Live revue at Revel Atlantic City. Rebecca Thomas of MTV News described the performance, "For one of our favorite numbers, 'Party,' the 4 singer donned full-on showgirl regalia in a heady rendition that saw confetti coming from the roof and dice-shaped beach balls being tossed through the crowd as dancers in large feathered headdresses magically turned up in the aisles." Both Maura Johnston of The Village Voice and Tris McCall of New Jersey On-Line noted that the confetti should have been dropped during the first or the last song. Dan DeLuca of The Philadelphia Inquirer wrote that "Party" was one of the "beat-savvy booty-shaking workouts" performed during the show. "Party" was on the setlist of The Formation World Tour (2016).

== Cover versions ==
On October 11, 2011, English singer–songwriter Eliza Doolittle posted a video of herself covering "Party", on her official website and other online media. In January 2012, American rapper Common sang a freestyle rap over the instrumental of Beyoncé's "Party" adding the lyrics, "We can put it all together/ You know the weather/ Me and Jasmine we can find forever". In February 2012, American band Chairlift and Kool A.D. covered the song on Triple J's Like a Version series.

== Credits and personnel ==
Credits for the album version of "Party" are adapted from 4 liner notes.

- Beyoncé Knowles – vocals, producer, songwriter
- Alex Asher – trombone
- André 3000 – vocals, songwriter
- Jeff Bhasker – producer, songwriter
- Consequence – background vocals
- Douglas Davis – songwriter
- Andrew Dawson – recorder
- Edwin Delahoz – engineer assistant
- Serban Ghenea – mixer
- Cole Kamen-Green – trumpet
- John Hanes – mix assistant
- Gaylord Holomalia – engineer assistant
- Christian Mochizuki – engineer assistant
- Serge Nudel – engineer assistant
- Morgan Price – tenor, baritone saxophone
- Drew Sayers – tenor, baritone saxophone
- Phil Seaford – mix engineer assistant
- Nick Videen – tenor, alto saxophone
- Ricky Walters – songwriter
- Kanye West – background vocals, producer, songwriter
- Josiah Woodson – trumpet
- Jordan "DJ Swivel" Young – engineer, vocal engineer

== Charts ==
=== Weekly charts ===
Chart (2011–2012)	Peak position
South Korea International (Gaon)	19
South Korea International (Gaon) Remix	2
US Billboard Hot 100	50
US Hot R&B/Hip-Hop Songs (Billboard)	2
US R&B/Hip-Hop Airplay (Billboard)	2
US Rhythmic (Billboard)	18

=== Year-end charts ===
Chart (2011)	Position
South Korea International (Gaon) Remix	73
US Hot R&B/Hip-Hop Songs (Billboard)	60

Chart (2012)	Position
US Hot R&B/Hip-Hop Songs (Billboard)	17

== Certifications ==
Region	Certification	Certified units/sales
Australia (ARIA)	Gold	35,000^{‡}
Canada (Music Canada)	Gold	40,000^{‡}
New Zealand (RMNZ)	Platinum	30,000^{‡}
United States (RIAA)	2× Platinum	2,000,000^{‡}
^{‡} Sales+streaming figures based on certification alone.

== Release history ==
Release dates and formats for "Party"
Region	Date	Version(s)	Format(s)	Label(s)	Ref.
United States	August 30, 2011	Original	Urban contemporary radio	Parkwood; Columbia	
Austria	October 24, 2011	Remix	Digital download	Sony Music	
Canada	October 24, 2011	Remix	Digital download	Sony Music	
Ireland	October 24, 2011	Remix	Digital download	Sony Music	
United States	October 24, 2011	Remix	Digital download	Parkwood; Columbia	
