= 1+1 (Beyoncé song) =

2011 song by Beyoncé

Promotional single by Beyoncé

from the album 4
- Released: May 25, 2011
- Recorded: 2010
- Studio: Studio at the Palms (Las Vegas, Nevada); Triangle Sound Studio (Atlanta, Georgia)
- Genre: Soul; R&B
- Length: 4:33
- Label: Columbia
- Songwriters: Terius Nash; Corey-Jackson Carter; Christopher Stewart; Beyoncé Knowles
- Producers: The-Dream; Tricky Stewart; Beyoncé

Music video
- "1+1" on YouTube

"1+1" is a song by American singer Beyoncé from her fourth studio album, 4 (2011). It was released by Columbia Records in the United States on May 25, 2011, as a promotional single. Serving as the opening track on 4, it was written and produced by The-Dream, Tricky Stewart and Beyoncé. "1+1" was originally titled "Nothing But Love" and The-Dream had initially planned to include it on his second studio album, Love vs. Money (2009). A slow-tempo R&B and soul power ballad, "1+1" lyrically discussing her endless love to her soul mate; the lyrics make strong statements about the power of the relationship.

"1+1" garnered acclaim from music critics, who noted its resemblance to the work of American singers Prince and Sam Cooke. It was also complimented for its subtle instrumentation, which provides emphasis on Beyoncé's vocals. "1+1" peaked at number 82 on the Canadian Hot 100 chart and at number 57 on the US Billboard Hot 100 chart. Its accompanying music video was directed by Beyoncé herself, alongside Lauren Briet and Ed Burke, and it premiered on August 26, 2011. The video was a "different" direction in the sense that it does not incorporate the heavy dance routines Beyoncé is known for, and that it experiments with psychedelic visual effects as well as innovative lighting, which give the clip a cinematic feel. The clip met with generally positive reception from music critics, who praised its aesthetic and sexual theme and claimed that it will be remembered as one of Beyoncé's most iconic visuals.

Soon after Beyoncé's performance on American Idol, a video that surfaced online received considerable coverage from different media. It was filmed by Jay-Z with a camera phone and shows Beyoncé rehearsing "1+1" backstage at American Idol. The ballad was included on Beyoncé's set list for a free concert as part of Good Morning America's Summer Concert Series, the ITV special A Night With Beyoncé, and her revue, 4 Intimate Nights with Beyoncé, held at the Roseland Ballroom in New York City. Beyoncé's live performances of "1+1" have received positive reception; a writer from HuffPost described her live performance on American Idol as "an epic, emotionally-charged [one]." American singers Dondria and Tiffany Evans have performed covers of the ballad, with lyrical modifications.

== Conception and release ==
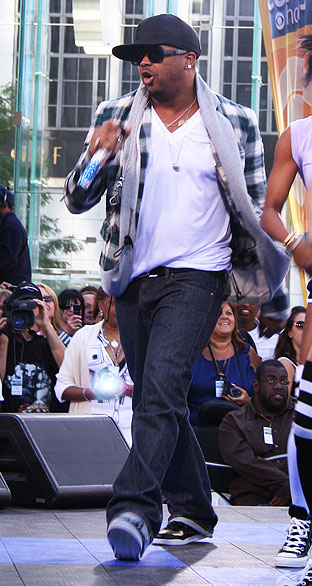
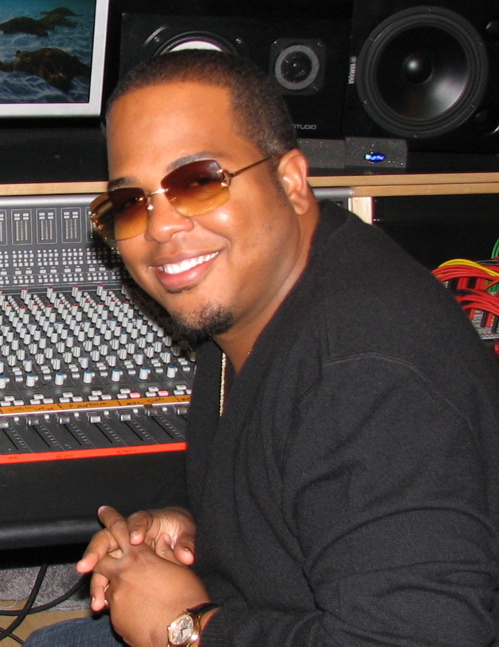
The-Dream (left) and Christopher Stewart (right) composed "1+1"

"1+1" was initially written and titled "Nothing but Love" for Terius "The-Dream" Nash, who intended to include it on his second studio album, Love King (2010). He later gave it to Beyoncé Knowles for her fourth studio album 4, where she and Christopher "Tricky" Stewart did some additional writing. The song was produced by the trio at the Studio at the Palms in Paradise, Nevada and Triangle Sound Studio in Atlanta, Georgia, where Beyoncé recorded the song. The-Dream and Stewart did the musical arrangements and Beyoncé worked on arranging the vocals. Lee Blaske, Nikki Glaspie and Pete Wolford played the instruments, while Brian Thomas alongside Pat Thrall assisted in recording the music. Jordan Young then recorded Beyoncé's vocals. Tony Maserati mixed the track with assistance from Val Brathwaite, and Jason Sherwood, Mark Gray, Steven Dennis and Wolford all assisted in the audio engineering.

Shortly after "1+1" was released online, Beyoncé debuted the ballad by performing a piano version on the finale of the tenth season of American Idol on May 25, 2011. "1+1" was made available for download only a few hours after her performance; its cover art was photographed by Anthony Duran. The song was released through the iTunes Store as a promotional single from 4 in the United States. People who pre-ordered 4 at the iTunes Store received a free download of "1+1". The song was not sent for airplay in the US as "Best Thing I Never Had" was favored as the second single, following the release of the lead single "Run the World (Girls)".

== Composition and lyrical interpretation ==
"1+1"
A 27-second sample of the chorus of "1+1", an emotional declaration of love and co-dependency. Knowles allows her voice to soar on the power ballad that instrumentally includes a guitar-dripped melody, a discreetly piping organ and a few piano chords.

"1+1" is a slow-tempo R&B and soul power ballad with influences of indie rock. The song features "a soft, almost non-existent" beat and makes use of a guitar and a piano as its foundation, while wind chimes, sprinkling strings, synthesizers, funk-influenced bass and a pipe organ are also present. "1+1" is set in 12/8 time with a slow tempo of 50 beats per minute and was written in the key of G♭ major. Beyoncé's voice spans from the low note of F_{#3} to the high note of C_{6}. "1+1" essentially demonstrates her "urgent" and "raw" vocals; in an interview with Ray Rogers of Billboard magazine, Beyoncé stated that she wanted to use her album 4 to showcase this side of her vocal abilities: "I used a lot of the brassiness and grittiness in my voice that people hear in my live performances, but not necessarily on my records." Nadine Cheung wrote that the subtle instrumentation allows Beyoncé's voice to emphasise the emotional lyrics Amos Barshad of New York magazine and Tim Finney of Pitchfork Media described the vocals as similar to those of Whitney Houston's work.

Several critics including Matthew Perpetua of Rolling Stone noted that "1+1" is comparable to Sam Cooke's 1960 song "Wonderful World" and Prince's 1984 song "Purple Rain". Brandon Soderberg of Pitchfork explained that "Wonderful World"'s line, "don't know much about algebra", was retained during the conception of "1+1" by its producers, who however accentuated its "love song sentiment". Soderberg further wrote that "1+1" bears resemblance to "Purple Rain" as they both have similar "delicate guitars, melodramatic piano, and [Beyoncé affects Prince's] high-register whimper a few times". Jillian Mapes of Billboard magazine wrote that the guitar solo is similar to the ones in Bon Jovi's power ballads.

"1+1" begins with a low fidelity indie rock arrangement which is brought about by distorted guitar arpeggios and a discreet pipe organ. Beyoncé sings a meandering melody as she alternately references the pleasures of love and sex. Using simple arithmetic to describe her undying love for her partner, she begins the first verse as she affirms to her romantic interest that the only thing she is sure about are her feelings for him, "I don't know much about algebra, but I know that one plus one equals two ... If I ain't got something, I don't give a damn / 'Cause I got it with you". In the pre-chorus lines, Beyoncé expresses her reliance on her man without whom she believes to be incomplete as she sings, "And it's me and you, that's all we'll have when the world is through / Because baby we ain't got nothing without love / Darling, you got enough love for the both of us".

Brandon Soderberg of Pitchfork commented that Beyoncé mixes "vulnerability and confidence" while singing the chorus lines, where she repeatedly pleads her romantic interest, "Make love to me when my days look low / Pull me in close and don't let me go / Make love to me when the world's at war / That our love will heal us all", while the music stays steady and soft with only a few piano chords and a baseline plucked guitar riff. As she continues to chant about having sex in apocalyptic circumstances, "So when the world's at war / Let our love heal us all", she projects a universal "all you need is love" feeling, as noted by Jillian Mapes. In the second verse, Beyoncé sings, "Hey! I don't know much about guns but I ... I've been shot by you", as she pushes the final word "you" up at a full octave. She then continues: "Hey! And I don't know when I'm gonna die, but I hope that I'm gonna die by you / Hey! And I don't know much about fighting, but I, I know I will fight for you / Hey! Just when I ball up my fist, I realize that I'm laying right next to you". According to Thomas Conner of the Chicago Sun-Times, these lines are intended to show that love conquers all. The song ends with an intense electric guitar solo.

== Critical reception ==
"1+1" was lauded by music critics, who complimented the effective display of Beyoncé's emotive vocals due to the use of light instrumentation, and approved that the ballad was the opening song on 4. AOL Music's Contessa Gayles called it "an achy, screechy ballad – in the best way possible" and Nadine Cheung from AOL Radio noted that the minimal instrumentation highlights the song's lyrics, and effectively show Beyoncé's "powerful voice and impressive control", further writing, "The professions are so intense that there's no need for a complicated bridge or dramatic key change." Brandon Soderberg from Pitchfork wrote, "she really digs in and sells the song's knotty qualities, and when that over-the-top guitar break appears exactly when it should, it's cathartic. At that precise moment, this passionate pastiche of timeless pop becomes a classic all its own." Ryan Dombal, writing for the same music webzine, commented that Adele's 'Someone Like You' is the only recent pop ballad which comes close to "the power" of "1+1". Michael Cragg of The Guardian called the song a "loved up ballad" and praised Beyoncé for showcasing her raw vocals. Describing "1+1" as "[having] no interest in [Beyoncé'ss] typical pursuit of forward-thinking, energetic fare, preferring to throw the emphasis on her radio-destroying vocal chords", David Amidon of PopMatters wrote that the song "is the best result of this, finally providing Beyoncé a song that can compete with the favorites of this generation's parents."

Jocelyn Vena of MTV News wrote, "Beyoncé may not know a thing about algebra, but when it comes to the math of power ballads, she totally gets it." Matthew Perpetua of Rolling Stone wrote that "the album [4] opens with its most tender ballad, a slow-burning number that calls back to both Sam Cooke's 'Wonderful World' and Prince's 'Purple Rain' without sounding like a retread of either tune [...] it sounds best in the context of the album, where its slow, steady build to a cathartic guitar break is the perfect introduction to a set of mostly low-key tracks about love and heartbreak." Similarly considering "1+1" to be "the perfect opener" of 4, Joanne Dorken of MTV UK wrote that it exposes a more vulnerable side of Beyoncé and that it will remain "a classic stripped-back slow jam from the diva." Praising Beyoncé's vocals, Jon Caramainca of The New York Times stated that "['1+1'] requires a vocal muscle few singers possess, and even fewer would care to deploy." Writing for The Baltimore Sun, Wesley Case included "1+1" in his list of Five Great Songs and praised song's concept, writing that he began crying when he heard the album version and called it "gut-wrenching" and "gorgeous". Case appreciated Beyoncé's sensitivity and concluded that it "fades to black like an ellipsis and it's so damn beautiful."

Cameron Adams of the Herald Sun wrote that "1+1" is an "amazing [and] arguably the most honest and tender Beyoncé has sounded, singing 'help me let my guard down, make love to me'". Similarly, Claire Suddath of Time magazine commented that "1+1" is probably the finest ballad Beyoncé has delivered in years. Amos Barshad of New York magazine described "1+1" as "a big grand love ballad". Andy Kellman of AllMusic picked "1+1" as one of the album's top songs, describing it as "a sparse and placid vocal showcase, [which] fades in with a somber guitar line, throws up occasional and brief spikes in energy, and slowly recedes." Chris Coplan of Consequence of Sound commented that in contrast to the geometry taught at school, there is something interesting in "1+1"; he further wrote that ballad focuses on Beyoncé's "amazing vocal range" as it is not upbeat like most of her previous offerings. Leah Collins of Canada's Dose described the song as a "melodramatic soul ballad". A reporter from The Huffington Post stated that "1+1" is a departure from "Run the World (Girls)", noting that "Beyoncé replaces the defiance of 'Run the World (Girls)' with devotion [in '1+1']". He added that it is one of the first representations that "Beyoncé is keeping her promise that a whole new array of sounds will make their way into 4." Similarly, Rap-Up favored the track stating that "If 'Run the World (Girls)' wasn't your thing, this should do the trick." By contrast, Katy Hasty from HitFix criticized the song's lyrics and wrote that it "seem[s] the lyrics to '1+1' were penned by a second-grader."

=== Recognition ===
The Guardian's critic Sean Michaels ranked "1+1" at number one on his list of The 10 Best Tracks of 2011. The song was also ranked on The Guardian's writers' year-end list of Best Songs of 2011 at number 30. Allison Stewart of The Washington Post placed the ballad at number one on her list of the Special Year-End Best-of Edition, writing that Beyoncé "just kills this otherwise unremarkable ballad. Her obvious pride in her abilities, in her Beyonce-ness, informs every note, but it doesn't seem showoff-y. It's just sweet." On The Village Voice's 2011 year-end Pazz & Jop singles list, "1+1" was ranked at number 77. The staff members of Pitchfork placed the "1+1" at number 26 on their list of The Top 100 Tracks of 2011, writing:

Following Beyoncé's work on "1+1" is like a journey to the center of her craft, a stripping away of every distraction until all that's left is her voice. Without it, "1+1" would be a muted ballad: Its simple guitar line and stardust-sprinkled strings serve no purpose other than to evoke a sense of familiar romantic intimacy, and then to elegantly step aside while Beyoncé delivers one of her most wonderfully impassioned performances ever. "1+1" possesses that slightly scary intensity that has been R&B's worst-kept secret weapon since Whitney Houston's "I Have Nothing", but it also demonstrates perfectly how Beyoncé stands apart from every other big-chested diva getting her Whitney on. She lets the song sing through her with a clarity that is never clinical, a strength that never sabotages, and an expressiveness that is precisely as sentimental as its subject matter requires. Beyoncé is R&B's field marshal, demanding of her listeners and herself an absolute fidelity to the music's emotional possibilities, with a perfectly modulated vehemence that is as captivating as it is tyrannical.

In 2019, Pitchfork listed "1+1" at number 157 on their greatest songs of the decade (2010s) list. In 2024, Rolling Stone named the record the 27th best R&B song of the 21st century.

Writing for The New Yorker, Jody Rosen credited the jarring timbral and tonal variations on the song for giving a new musical sound that didn't exist in the world before Beyoncé. He further wrote, "If they sound 'normal' now, it's because Beyoncé, and her many followers, have retrained our ears."

== Chart performance ==
"1+1" entered the US Hot Digital Songs chart at number 33 on June 11, 2011, having sold 57,000 downloads in the previous week. As a result, the song also appeared at number 57 on the US Billboard Hot 100 chart. The following week, it fell to number 89 on the Hot 100 chart. Overall, it charted for only two weeks. For the week ending June 11, 2011, the song charted on the US Bubbling Under R&B/Hip-Hop Singles at number 5. That same week, "1+1" entered the Canadian Hot 100 chart at number 82. Following the release of 4 and based solely on digital downloads, "1+1" appeared on the UK Singles Chart at number 67 and on the UK R&B Chart at number 23 in the July 9, 2011 issue. After the release of its music video, "1+1" moved from number 125 to number 71 on the UK Singles Chart on September 11, 2011. The following week, it reached a high point of number 21 on the R&B chart. Selling 18,263 downloads, the song opened at number 25 on the South Korea Gaon International Singles Chart for the week ending July 2, 2011.

== Music video ==
=== Background and synopsis ===
An image of Beyoncé in the video for "1+1", which is given a cinematic feel by experiments with lighting and symmetrical filming photography.

It was reported in early August 2011 that Beyoncé was recording new music videos for several songs from 4, including "1+1" which was shot by August 3, 2011. The video premiered on August 26, 2011, on E! News at 7:00 pm EST/PST and it was posted on Beyoncé's website one hour later. It was directed by Beyoncé herself, alongside Laurent Briet and Ed Burke. The video was described by her official website as "the story of love at its best. It's about commitment and fulfillment and it's Beyoncé at her most beautiful. The video experiments with psychedelic visual effects and innovative lighting that gives the clip a cinematic feel." The music video for the song is four and a half minutes long. The director's cut of "1+1" was released on November 1, 2011. It features slightly different scenes to the original.

The song's video features close-up shots of Beyoncé and incorporates psychedelic light effects and symmetrical filming photography. As the acoustic guitar begins playing, Beyoncé's face comes into view. She stands with her blond hair draped just below her exposed shoulders. As she intently stares into the camera, her skin glistens as though it has been coated with a honey-like and glittery substance. Turning her head from right to left, with her eyes fixed off-camera, Beyoncé starts belting out the first verse. As the chorus is reached, scenes of Beyoncé in a darkened room are shown. Additionally, she places her face delicately against dripping water, gently brushing it with her lips and palms. The scenery changes and Beyoncé is back in the darkened chamber, where she removes her dress.

A quick shot of the "IV" tattoo inked on Beyoncé's left ring finger is shown (a reference to her album's title, 4), before she bathes in a tub of flowers as well as berries and blows billows of smoke. As she continues to caress her upper-body, an array of light imagery is projected behind her, serving as a backdrop. During the second verse, the video begins to use symmetrical visual arts. Beyoncé appears standing in front of a purple background, draped by large and billowing garments. As the song progresses, her emotions are heightened; zoomed shots of tears trickling down her cheeks are shown. A man appears behind Beyoncé and begins closely embracing her in endearment. The man is nondescript, and his muscular arms grip Beyoncé's body before taking her through a series of dips and bends, while he remains mostly in the background. With tears still rolling down her cheeks, Beyoncé chants to her love interest to have sex with her on the song's vocal finale. As the guitar melodies close the song, Beyoncé is seen engulfed by the colorful light and special effects. The video ends with the camera returning to a glistening Beyoncé with blackened scenery in the background.

=== Reception ===
Jennifer Cady of E! News found the video "sexy" and "pretty stripped down", further writing: "There are no catchy choreographed dances or freakum dresses, just Queen Bey looking gorgeous in lingerie and belting out her love and devotion to her man." Cady added that the video was entertaining because of Beyoncé "seriously magical hair" and her skin, which was sparkling like Edward Cullen. Tanner Stransky of Entertainment Weekly concluded that although the video was different from the previous "heavily produced spectacles" Beyoncé has made, "it's hard to take your eyes off it". Spencer Kornhaber of The Atlantic criticized the sex appeal which was used in the videos for Lady Gaga's "You and I" (2011) and Katy Perry's "Last Friday Night (T.G.I.F.)" (2011) but felt that "Beyonce's game is unique in its reliance on pure visual magnetism". He wrote that even when Beyoncé is "inhabiting apocalyptic warzones or Mad Men-era domestic scenes", she is always classical. Kornhaber concluded that the video for "1+1" is "catchy, fun dance, pretty face, pretty body", which according to him, is what "Beyonce [has] always been about". Melinda Newman from the website HitFix found "some lovely kaleidoscopic shots and billowing sheets". She added that "we never see her '+1' other than an arm and back shot, but that works to the video's advantage".

Similarly, Willa Paskin of New York magazine praised the final minute of the video in which "we are treated to what is supposed to be the instrumental equivalent of an orgasm", illustrated by split-screen kaleidoscope effects and capped off by Beyoncé staring into the camera "in postcoital contentment". Mawuse Ziegbe of The Boston Globe noted that Beyoncé'ss sex appeal was at its maximum in the video for "1+1". She compared the kaleidoscope effects with Lady Gaga's "Born This Way" (2011) and finished her review by writing, "ultimately, the clip shows the diva doesn't need the elaborate costumes, club-anthem rhythms and booty-quivering grooves to bring the heat. But a lustrous, fling-ready mane is always handy." Similarly, a writer for MTV UK praised the video's "light effects and symmetrical camera tricks" which "[sell] sex as art". Leah Collins of the Canadian magazine Dose commented that Beyoncé was "gifted with seemingly supernatural powers of hotness" in the video. A writer for Rolling Stone found the video for "1+1" to be "the moistest music video ever made", adding that it "perfectly matches the sultry, romantic tone of the song". Maura Johnston of The Village Voice found a "'What D'Angelo's 'Untitled (How Does It Feel)' Feels Like For A Girl' vibe" in the video for "1+1" and compared it to the one for "Sweet Dreams" (2009).

Rob Markman of MTV News wrote that the choreography is very different from the Beyoncé's standard dance routines, which feature high-powered steps, swaying hips and "her patented bootylicious shake". He commented, "Instead, Beyoncé settles for ballet-style steps, moving in a leotard and long, flowing cape." Markman added that the video will most likely remain "under the radar" in comparison to the highlights in her high-budgeted reel, which includes clips like "Single Ladies (Put a Ring on It)" (2008) and "Crazy in Love" (2003). He concluded that "much like the song, the visuals for '1+1' shouldn't be measured in terms of size, but rather in emotive presentation and subdued sexiness". A writer for The Huffington Post wrote that the music video for "Single Ladies (Put a Ring on It)" was Beyoncé'ss most iconic visual work, but added that after the premiere of the video for "1+1", "it may now have company". David Malitz of The Washington Post stated that Beyoncé looks like Hurricane Irene at the beginning of the video, but added that she looks like "any number of chillwave videos" at the end. A more mixed review was given by OK! magazine, which described the video as cheesy. L Magazine's Mike Conklin was unsatisfied with the video, writing that since Beyoncé is rightfully considered to be among "the absolute best [artists]", she can do better."

== Live performances ==
Beyoncé first performed "1+1" live on American Idol on May 25, 2011. Wearing a purple gown, she sang the song surrounded by smoke and red lighting, declaring, "This is my favorite song". Towards the end of the performance, she fell to her knees and shook the hands of audience members. The performance earned her a standing ovation from the judges and members of the crowd. A writer from The Huffington Post called it "an epic, emotionally-charged performance" and praised the fact that Beyoncé "channel[led] every particle of the room's energy into her lung-bursting calls and cries." Jillian Mapes of Billboard magazine noted, "The sheer force of the ballad literally brought [Beyoncé] to her knees during the performance."

Shortly after Beyoncé's performance on American Idol, a video that surfaced online received considerable coverage from music critics. It became an instant viral video as soon as it hit the web. The clip was filmed using a camera phone and it shows Beyoncé rehearsing "1+1" backstage at American Idol with no microphone and simple keyboard accompaniment. The video was filmed by Beyoncé's husband, Jay-Z. In an introduction to the video on his Life + Times website he wrote: "Sometimes you need perspective. You've been right in front of greatness so often that you need to step back and see it again for the first time." In 2013, John Boone and Jennifer Cady of E! Online placed the video at number eight on their list of Beyoncé's ten best videos, writing that she sounds "perfect". While reviewing 4, Pitchfork's Ryan Dombal complimented the video, writing:

"One of the year's best music videos was directed by Jay-Z and cost about zero dollars to make. The video has a similar impromptu charm to the many intimate, one-shot performance clips popularized by Vincent Moon's Take-Away Shows, its appeal compounded by the shock of seeing such a notoriously manicured superstar without embellishment. It's all quite endearing and personal – two words one might not often associate with this superhumanly talented and famous couple."

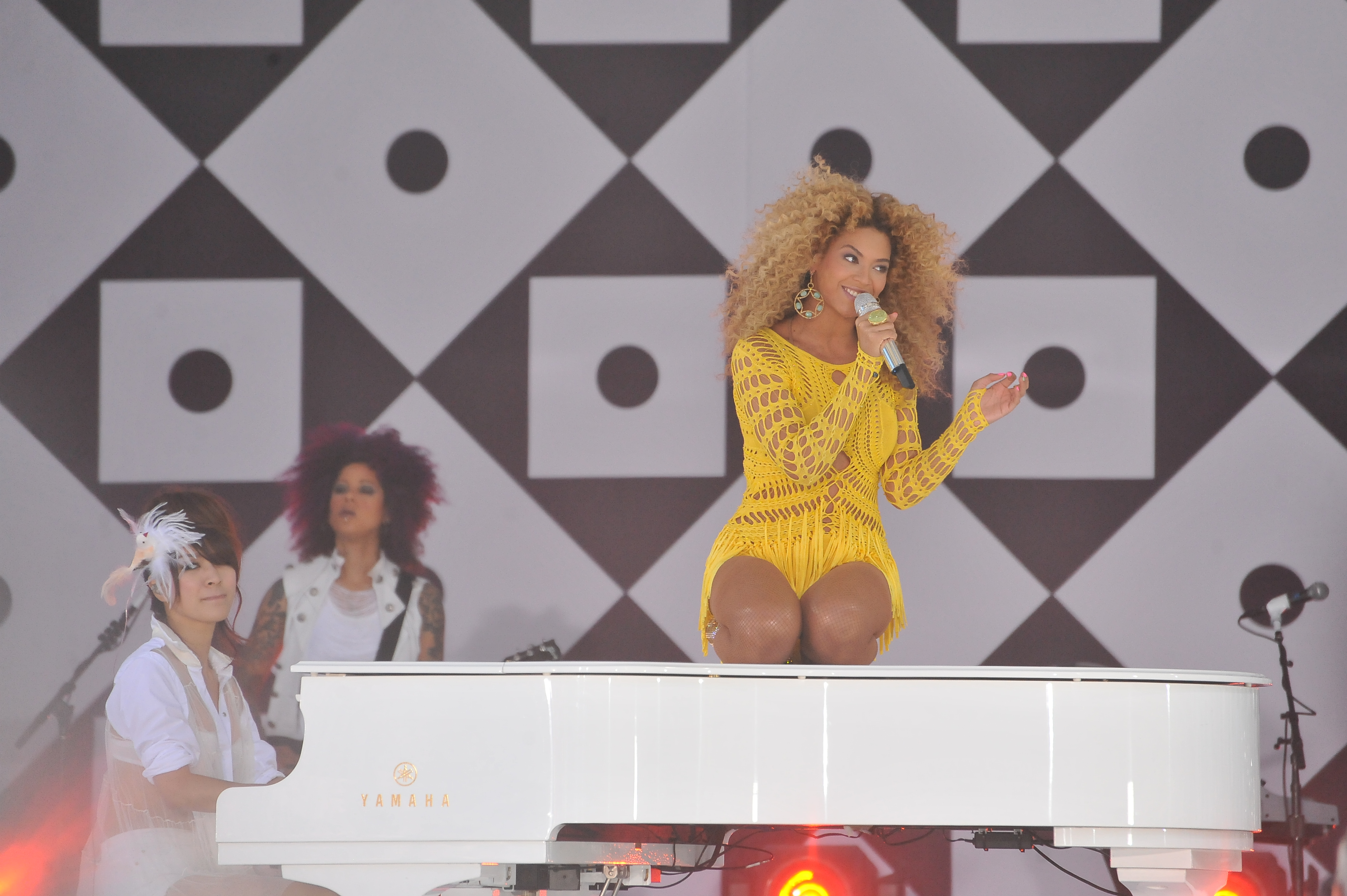
Beyoncé performing "1+1" on Good Morning America's Summer Concert Series

On July 1, 2011, Beyoncé performed a free concert as part of Good Morning America's Summer Concert Series. She sang "1+1" while kneeling on top of a white grand piano. Beyoncé also performed the song live on the TV show, The View. She sang "1+1" live on August 14, 2011, during 4 Intimate Nights with Beyoncé, held in Roseland Ballroom, New York City. Wearing a gold dress, she performed the song in front of 3,500 people while her band and orchestra were watching on. During the performance, Beyoncé climbed on top of a piano and sang on her knees. Erika Ramirez of Billboard magazine wrote that Beyoncé performed "1+1", "wrapped up in smoke and red hued lights, reminiscent of her live performance on the American Idol finale." Ramirez stated that Beyoncé sang the ballad with "impeccability." Entertainment Weekly's Brad Wete wrote that Beyoncé's voice "rang soulfully, only breaking to let the crowd fill in gaps for a sing-along feel." Joycelyn Vena of MTV News commented that on "1+1", Beyoncé's vocal abilities "outshined it all." On September 14, 2011, Beyoncé stopped at Target perform at the managers meeting. Wearing a red dress, she sang "1+1" accompanied by three backup singers and a pianist. During the ITV special A Night With Beyoncé which aired on December 4 in the United Kingdom, Beyoncé performed "1+1" to a selected crowd of fans.

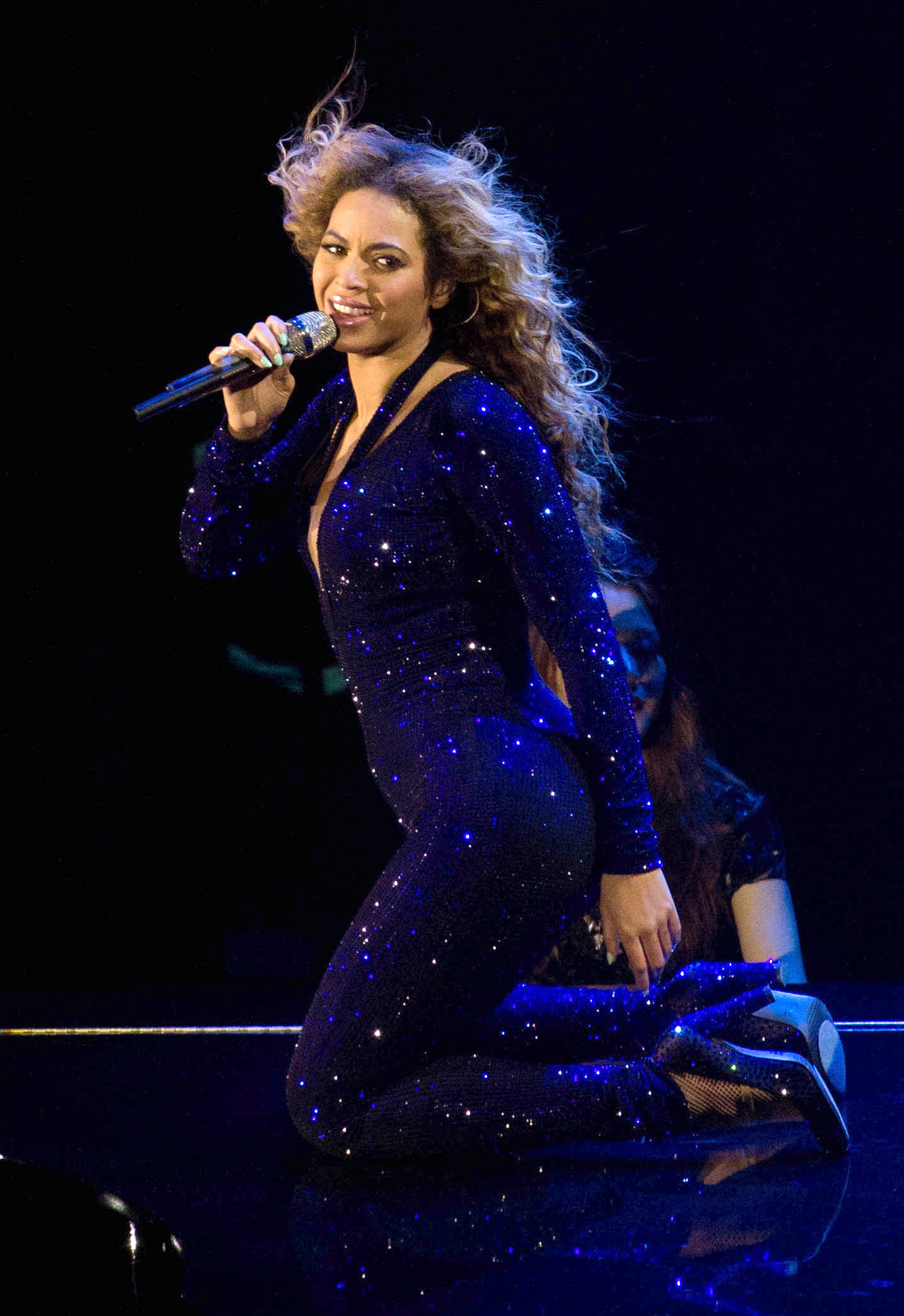
Beyoncé performing "1+1" on the Mrs. Carter Show World Tour in 2013

In May 2012, Beyoncé performed "1+1" during her Revel Presents: Beyoncé Live revue in Revel Atlantic City. She performed the song while kneeling on the piano. Jim Farber of Daily News commented that the song was sung with "precision and sweep, she tipped the balance decidedly softer, giving her power grounding". According to Chuck Darrow of The Philadelphia Inquirer, the acoustic performance of the ballad, "proved a nice respite from the relentless thump-thump-thump of the many dance-pop numbers". Tris McCall of New Jersey On-Line complimented the "magnificent run through the slow-burning" song. Ben Ratliff of The New York Times mentioned "1+1" in the "almost continuous high point" of the concert. Brad Wete of Complex magazine wrote that "B[eyoncé]'s voice was stellar" during the performance of the song on the revue.

The song has also been included on the setlists for the 2013 and 2014 shows of The Mrs. Carter Show World Tour, The Formation World Tour, and the Renaissance World Tour.

== Other versions and usage in media ==
The-Dream's demo of "1+1", originally titled as "Nothing but Love", leaked onto the Internet in late May 2011. Michael Cragg of The Guardian found it to be "Prince-esque". In late June 2011, American recording artist Dondria posted a video of herself, singing "1+1" while seated in front her computer. On July 12, 2011, Rap-Up reported that the American singer, Tiffany Evans, who had previously covered "Speechless" from Beyoncé's first studio album, Dangerously in Love (2003), had also covered "1+1", with some lyrical modifications. Miss Murphy covered the song during the second series of Australian The Voice on May 20, 2013. Murphy's version peaked at number 49 on the Australian Singles Chart.

Beyoncé appeared on Entertainment Tonight on June 16, 2011, to promote the exclusive-to-Target deluxe edition of 4 and gave fans a sneak preview of its television commercial. The 30-second commercial, which features "1+1" and "Countdown" playing in the background, began airing in the United States on June 24, 2011.

Rapper Pusha T sampled the song on for the track "Rock N Roll" from his fourth studio album It's Almost Dry (2022).

== Credits and personnel ==
Credits adapted from 4 liner notes.

- Lee Blaske – strings
- Val Brathwaite – mixer assistant
- Steven Dennis – engineer assistant
- Mark Gray – engineer assistant
- Nikki Glaspie – drums
- Beyoncé Knowles – vocals, producer, songwriter
- Tony Maserati – mixer
- Terius "The-Dream" Nash – producer, songwriter
- Jason Sherwood – engineer assistant
- Christopher "Tricky" Stewart – producer, songwriter
- Brian "B- LUV" Thomas – recorder
- Pat Thrall – recorder
- Pete Wolford – engineer assistant, guitar
- Jordan "DJ Swivel" Young – vocals recorder

== Charts ==
Weekly chart performance for "1+1"
Chart (2011)	Peak position
Canadian Hot 100	82
Portuguese Ringtone Chart	14
South Korea Gaon International Singles Chart	25
UK Singles Chart	71
UK R&B Chart	21
US Billboard Hot 100	57
US Bubbling Under R&B/Hip-Hop Singles	5

== Certifications ==
Certifications and sales for "1+1"
Region	Certification	Certified units/sales
Australia (ARIA)	Gold	35,000^{‡}
Brazil (Pro-Música Brasil)	Gold	30,000^{‡}
New Zealand (RMNZ)	Gold	15,000^{‡}
United Kingdom (BPI)	Silver	200,000^{‡}
United States (RIAA)	Platinum	1,000,000^{‡}
^{‡} Sales+streaming figures based on certification alone.
