= Heaven (Beyoncé song) =

Song performed by Beyoncé

Song by Beyoncé

from the album Beyoncé
- Released: December 13, 2013
- Recorded: 2013
- Studio: Westlake Recording Studios (West Hollywood, California); Jungle City Studios, Oven Studios (New York City)
- Genre: Gospel; pop
- Length: 3:50
- Label: Parkwood; Columbia
- Songwriters: Beyoncé Knowles; Jordan "Boots" Asher
- Producers: Beyoncé Knowles; Boots

Music video
- "Heaven" on YouTube

"Heaven" is a song recorded by American singer Beyoncé for her self-titled fifth studio album (2013). It was written and produced by the singer along with musician Boots who collaborated on the majority of the tracks on the album. Although speculation hinted the song to be inspired by the singer's miscarried child and recorded as a tribute, it was revealed that she drew inspiration from her mother Tina, losing her best friend. "Heaven" is a piano ballad with gospel and pop elements and emotional vocals which received comparisons to Beyoncé's 2008 song "Halo". The personal lyrics describe the protagonist mourning the death of a beloved person by repeating a sentimental hook. Music critics provided positive reviews for the track, praising its placement on the album and Beyoncé's vocal performance.

The music video for "Heaven" was directed by Todd Tourso and Beyoncé and was released alongside the album on December 13, 2013. It was filmed in Puerto Rico and New York City and stars Ashley Everett, the singer's long-time dance collaborator for her concerts. The clip shows important moments from the life of Beyoncé and Everett, who portray two best friends. During the end, it is made clear that one of them has died and the other is seen mourning her at the church and cemetery. Like the song, the video was praised for its emotional scenes and acting as well as the religious undertones. "Heaven" was performed live by Beyoncé during the European leg of The Mrs. Carter Show World Tour in 2014 as the concerts' closing song.

== Background ==
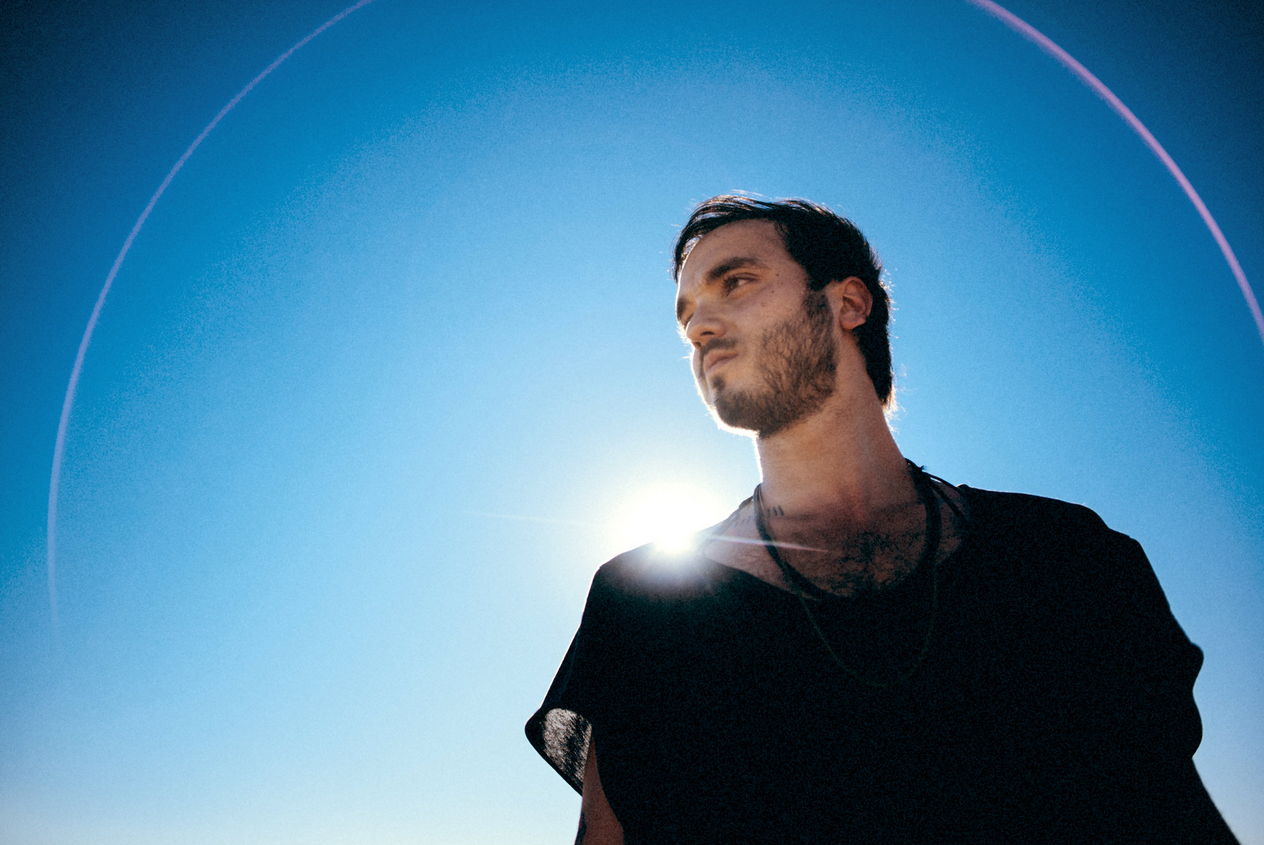
Boots (pictured) served as the co-producer and co-writer of "Heaven" along with Beyoncé.

"Heaven" was written and produced by Beyoncé and Boots. It was recorded with the guidance of Boots, Stuart White and Rob Cohen at three studios: Westlake Recording Studios in West Hollywood, California as well as Jungle City Studios and Oven Studios, both located in New York City. The audio engineering was finished by Ramon Rivas with assistance from Christian Humphreys. All instruments in "Heaven" are played by Boots. Tony Maserati and Stuart White mixed the song at Mirrorball Studios in North Hollywood, California. James Krausse engineered the mix with the assistance of Justin Hergett. The audio mastering was completed by Tom Coyne and Aya Merrill at Sterling Sound in New York City. The song was recorded following the shooting for the music video of "XO", in August 2013. Beyoncé recorded it the same night and the song was finalized in a week.

Upon the release of "Heaven", fans and media speculated that it was dedicated to the child Beyoncé lost during a miscarriage. The singer publicly talked about the miscarriage which happened before the birth of Blue Ivy during an appearance on The Oprah Winfrey Show and her HBO documentary Life Is But a Dream (2013). Beyoncé also wrote and recorded a song called "Heartbeat" to cope with the loss, which did not make it on the album. Her husband, rapper Jay Z, had also mentioned the miscarriage in his song "Glory" (2012) released after the birth of Blue Ivy. The experience made her doubt whether she would have children in the future, and she described it as "one of the hardest things" she had to endure.

Boots explained that there were multiple connotations to the lyrics of the song. With website Genius, he clarified that he was not in a position to confirm the subject matter, further noting that each listener could interpret it in their own way. He elaborated, "The main point was to ease the hearts and minds of anyone who have suffered from an unthinkable loss. I also originally wrote the song as comfort to the idea that death is a part of the cycle of life and a loved one's life should be celebrated. In New Orleans, a funeral in some ways is a parade. They march through the streets with the casket and play jazz. Think of it as one final celebration." Beyoncé explained on her iTunes Radio channel that "Heaven" was about "death and finding the strength in knowing that someone had an incredible life and that giving you some type of closure". Todd Tourso, the director of the song's music video, stated that "Heaven" was inspired by the death of her mother's best friend and its impact on her life.

== Composition ==
"Heaven" is a mournful, understated slow-tempo ballad with gospel and pop overtones. It is instrumentally complete with a hymn-like simple piano. According to the sheet music published on the website Musicnotes.com, it is composed using time signature of common time in the key of A Major with a slow tempo of 52 beats per minute. Beyoncé's vocals range from the low note of C#_{3} to the higher note of E_{5}. It contains the sequence of A–C_{#m}–F_{#m}–C_{#m} as its chord progression. Chris Bosman from Consequence of Sound described the song as a blend of "cinematic reach of modern Top 40 pop with the patience and melancholy of post-808s & Heartbreaks [sic] hip-hop". Paste reviewer Philip Cosores noted how the song sounded as if it "work[ed] together" with other Boots-produced material on the album, including "Blue" and "Haunted". A writer from Fuse, opined that the song sounded slightly like a second part of the singer's own ballad "Halo" (2008). Similarly, Lindsey Weber from Vulture deemed it an "answer" to "Halo". Variety journalist Andrew Barker likened the song to Rihanna's "Stay" (2012) while adding that it succeeded in "improving on it in every way".

"Heaven" lyrically talks about the protagonist saying a final goodbye to a deceased beloved person. It contains emotional lyrics which offer comfort to the protagonist. The ballad opens with the line "I fought for you the hardest, it made me the strongest, So tell me your secrets — I just can't stand to see you leaving" sang with emotional and touching vocals by the singer. The hook "Heaven couldn't wait for you / No heaven couldn't wait for you / So go on, go home" is continuously repeated. BET'a Latifah Muhammad described Beyoncé's vocal rendition as "heartbreaking yet optimistic". "Heaven" closes with a spoken 20-second snippet outro of the Lord's Prayer (Spanish: "Padre Nuestro") recited in Spanish by Melissa Vargas, the singer's brand manager. Many critics noted how the song may have been inspired by the singer's miscarriage. Clare Lobenfeld from Complex magazine concluded that the song featured Beyoncé's coping mechanisms for the loss of her child, which included using humor to hide pain. According to Spin writer Anupa Mistry, it is in line with one of the themes touched on in the parent album, motherhood. On the album, "Heaven" is placed before "Blue", as the penultimate track. It was noted by critics that both songs were antidotes to each other – while the former discusses notions of death, the latter celebrates birth. Joey Guerra from the Houston Chronicle found the inclusion of those songs as the last on Beyoncé as a metaphor for the entire album "Darkness always gives way to light, and heartbreak, if you hold on, is always followed by hope".

== Critical reception ==
We reach motherhood and the joys and heartbreaks that come along with it in the final pair of songs. "Heaven" is said to be about the miscarriage she suffered from before finally giving birth to Blue Ivy. It's the type of message that takes a lot of strength to express, especially for the woman who had to endure it. To follow it with a song named after and featuring her infant daughter is the most powerful moment of all, and showcases just how much one woman can overcome, another one of life's hurdles Yonce would not let stop her.

— The Village Voice's Brittany Spanos talking about "Heaven"

Latifah Muhammad from the BET called the ballad a "field of emotional land mines, which is fitting given the subject matter". The A.V. Club writer Evan Rytlewski wrote that the singer managed to convey "real, unfettered pain" on the "crushing tribute" to her miscarried baby. Korina Lopez from USA Today called the ballad "sweet" and one that offers a "peek into her family life". Mesfin Fekadu from the Associated Press noted the song to be more honest than Beyoncé's previous work. Anupa Mistry from Spin found a "moving story of a miscarriage" in the track. Tom Breihan from the website Stereogum lauded Beyoncé's decision to record a song about the important subject of miscarriage, calling it "an incredibly brave and real act" and noting how it acted as a "hug" to people with similar experiences. He concluded that "[p]eople are going to cry their eyes out to this" before naming "Heaven" and "Blue" "maybe the realest, most grown-up things Beyoncé has ever done".

Sputnikmusic's Conrad Tao praised the placement of "Heaven" and "Blue" as the closing two songs on Beyoncé, deeming it "hugely cathartic, like an extended and necessary epilogue... following an acceptance of death with a celebration of life isn't innovative so much as logically powerful". Similar sentiments were offered by Fact magazine's Chris Kelly, who praised the fact the album closed with three low-key ballads and added "The latter pair [the somber 'Heaven', and the joyful 'Blue' are two sides of the same coin: the heartbreaking 'Heaven' is most likely about her miscarriage, while 'Blue' celebrates (and features) daughter Blue Ivy". Philip Cosores of Paste felt that the closing portion of the album was "probably the best of her career", including "the unabashed, uncompromising tribute 'Heaven'". Ryan B. Patrick, in an album review for Exclaim! commented how the last two songs "drive things home on an intensely personal vibe". Joey Guerra from the Houston Chronicle wrote how among many confessional songs on the album, "Heaven" and "Blue" manage to "feel the most personal. Brandon Soderberg, in a review for Spin stated that Beyoncé's closing consisted of "what has got to be one of the bravest combinations of songs in often album-averse modern R&B".

Mike Diver from Clash praised Beyoncé's unleashed vocals on the ballad, hailing her "power and control" as "breathtaking". On a similar note, Julia Leconte from the newspaper Now deemed her vocals as "perfect" when unleashed on the ballad. A David Atlanta writer concluded how "Beyoncé, in her moments of vulnerability, with her emotive vocals, shows why she has been a force to be reckoned with in the music industry", something he noted in "Heaven". Greg Kot of the Chicago Tribune found some of the singer's "most unguarded and daring singing" in her career on the song. Clare Lobenfeld from Complex called "Heaven"'s hook "poetic and truly heartbreaking". Describing it as "wrenching", The Daily Beast's Kevin Fallon, noted how it finds the "polished singer absolutely raw, wailing over a faint ivory tinkle". Jon Pareles from The New York Times noted how the song "may be heard at funerals for years to come". Billboard journalists Andrew Hampp and Erika Ramirez opined that producer Boots helped the singer show her emotional and gentle side on the ballad. Neil McCormick of The Daily Telegraph deemed "Heaven" as the "only straight ballad" on the album and noted how despite the gospel elements and "tearjerking" vocals present, "Beyoncé keeps it tight and close rather than big and blousy". The Irish Times editor Una Mullally described "Heaven" as "simple but beautiful". Under the Radar writer Ryan E.C. Hamm was more negative towards the track, dismissing it as a "flaw" on Beyoncé along with "Pretty Hurts". He summarized them as "okay songs, but a little on the nose". Jody Rosen writing for Vulture.com called the ballad "pallid" and one of the album's "baggy moments".

== Music video ==
=== Background and development ===
A music video for "Heaven" was released on December 13, 2013 through the iTunes Store, in addition to a clip for every other track on the parent album. On November 24, 2014 the clip was also uploaded to the singer's Vevo account to coincide with the release of the platinum re-issue of Beyoncé. The clip was directed by Beyoncé and Tedd Tourso, the latter also serving as the creative director for the entire album; "Heaven" marked the first music video he directed. The music video features Ashley Everett, who has served as the singer's dance captain and back-up dancer on the singer's concerts. After Beyoncé recorded the song, she sent it to Tourso through email, saying that she would like to shoot its video in Puerto Rico. Along with the track, she sent a script written for it, complete with various reference images and stories. Tourso further elaborated on the video,

"Originally, her main inspiration for that song and that video was watching her mother lose one of her best friends. So Beyoncé’s treatment — which was incredibly detailed and fleshed out, shockingly so, at seven in the morning — was juxtaposing this gut-wrenching sad song with really happy visuals of two girls who are best friends doing all these amazing things, and then at the end of the video you find out that it was one of the girls' bucket lists, and she’s actually dead. So we went out there to shoot that, and in shooting it, we realized that a lot of the more epic moments that we had originally wanted to capture came across as contrived, and a lot of the natural things that we had filmed looked very real and very beautiful."

A group of ten people was present for the shooting of the video, including the singer's stylist, hairdresser, makeup artist, security, director of photography, producers and Tourso. He described the shooting process saying, "we would just wake up and meet and just go shoot and kind of figure out scenarios on the fly". It was shot during the Latin American leg of The Mrs. Carter Show World Tour, with the crew traveling between set and concerts. Some of the scenes which included Everett and Beyoncé, were also filmed in locations across New York City, including Times Square. Beyoncé approached Everett with the concept of them acting two best friends in the video for "Heaven" while they were shooting the clip for "Blow". Everett agreed, calling the offer "an honor". During an interview with Vibe, she described the filming as secretive, with the song not being played in its entirety, in order to prevent staff from leaking it on the Internet.

Some of the scenes for the visual were also filmed in private jets, helicopters, and using zip-line, however, they were not included in the final version. During an interview with Out magazine, Tourso spoke about his collaboration with Beyoncé, calling her "open to mistakes" and praising her work ethic. He recalled that when they were watching the footage that had been filmed for "Heaven", "it was actually all the real stuff we shot that felt powerful and the other stuff we shot that felt kind of corny". While discussing it with the singer, she agreed and the concept behind the clip slightly changed: "It's the same concept [with the bucket list], but it's not quite as literal and defined. Instead, we had happy vignettes of these two girls throughout their life and it'll just end with her walking through a cemetery. Kind of abstract and less literal in the end. I think it made it much more powerful."

=== Synopsis and reception ===
A still from the music video for "Heaven" in which Beyoncé is seen together with Ashley Everett. In the scenes where the two are seen together praying at the church, Everett has already died and Beyoncé mourns her.

The video for the song is meant to illustrate two best friends, completing things from their bucket list before they die, wanting to know that they lived a happy life. It opens with the two of them taking a picture in a photo booth. Beyoncé is then seen walking in a church, sitting next to Everett and starting to pray with her. The two are later seen doing various activities together: skinny dipping, having a bonfire by the beach, celebrating, getting matching tattoos (a cross between their breasts), getting married, driving a car and passing time with their babies. All these scenes showing them together turn out to be flashbacks experienced by the friend who is alive. At one point, when the two females are seen together praying at church, it is implied that Everett is dead, and Beyoncé is the one mourning her at the cemetery. The video shows a tearful Beyoncé crying throughout for her friend; she lights candles and brings flowers to her grave. Everett is also seen alone in various scenes, performing dance moves in the church. Beyoncé is dressed in a Chanel dress with a ruffled cardigan and pumps by Dior for the scenes filmed at the cemetery.

Kristine Kowalski from the website Hollywoodlife.com felt that the singer appeared heartbroken, mourning and recalling the happy moments she had with a beloved person. El País journalist Marcos Carlos felt that it underlies the singer's religion as she is seen praying in a church. Ranking the video at number 11 on his list of the best clips from the visual album Beyoncé, Brent DiCrescenzo of the magazine Time Out compared the usage of religious imagery to Madonna. Whitney Phaneuf from the website HitFix, ranked it at number 16 on a similar list, writing how the video literally interpreted the song and it sentimentally portrayed "Beyonce coping with loss". Sharifa Daniels of Vibe magazine deemed it the "most touching song and video" by Beyoncé. Michelle Collins from Vanity Fair wrote in her review that the video was "very sad", "serious" and "haunting" comparing some of the scenes with Instagram videos. Michael Zelenko from The Fader praised the video as an "appropriately sentimental fare, full of nostalgic scenes of better days gone by against shots of Bey mourning, but looking beautiful as ever". Randal Roberts of Los Angeles Times noted that the singer looked "refreshed" in the clip. A writer of Billboard commented that she looks peaceful and prepared to say goodbye for the last time. A writer of Fuse, praised the singer's "high-fashion look" as well as the "gorgeous" church which served as a filming location. He pointed out the scene where the two friends jump in a pool as "hot". A writer of The New York Times described the singer's look in the video as "ladylike". Sharing what he perceived to be "key" moments in each of the seventeen music videos on the album, John Walker of MTV News identified one for "Heaven" where Beyoncé "breaks down in the church". Vice magazine's Brandon Soderberg called it a visualization of "grief and acceptance by way of shots of a dancer contorting in church, as if she were ecstatic and in pain at the same time". Deeming it as a "serene tribute", Billy Johnson, Jr. from Yahoo! Music noted how it finds Beyoncé "paying her respects" to a deceased friend.

== Live performances ==
"Heaven" was part of the setlist during the European leg of Beyoncé's worldwide The Mrs. Carter Show World Tour which took place in February and March 2014. The song was performed as the last one on the set, with Beyoncé singing it alone on stage. A writer of Digital Spy criticized her decision to replace "Halo" with "Heaven" as the closing song, noting that "it [is] a bit of a downer to end things on". On the other hand, Idolator's Mike Wass was positive of its addition to the setlist. In 2014, a live performance video of the song aired on Beyonce: X10, an HBO series documenting performances of the song during The Mrs. Carter Show World Tour; it was also included on the platinum edition of Beyoncé.

== Credits and personnel ==
Credits are adapted from the liner notes of Beyoncé and the singer's official website.

Song credits

- Writing – Boots, Beyoncé
- Production – Boots, Beyoncé
- Vocal production – Beyoncé
- Recording – Boots, Stuart White, Rob Cohen; Westlake Recording Studios, West Hollywood, California; Jungle City Studios and Oven Studios, New York City
- Second engineering – Ramon Rivas
- Assistant engineering – Christian Humphreys
- Instruments – Boots
- Audio mixing – Tony Maserati, Stuart White; Mirrorbal Studios, North Hollywood, California
- Mix engineering – James Krausse
- Assistant mix engineering – Justin Hergett
- Sampling – "Lord's Prayer"; recited by Melissa Vargas
- Audio mastering – Tom Coyne, Aya Merrill; Sterling Sound, New York City

Video credits

- Featuring – Ashley Everett
- Director – Beyoncé, Todd Tourso
- Director of photography – Jackson Hunt
- Executive producer – Erinn Williams
- Producer – Brian Turner, Shane Brown
- Production company – Parkwood Entertainment
- Stylist – Ty Hunter, Raquel Smith
- Additional styling – Tim White
- Editor – Adam "Zuk" Zuckerman
- Brand manager – Melissa Vargas
- Hair – Neal Farinah
- Make-up – Sir John, Francesca Tolot
- Color correction – Tom Poole
- Visual effects – Nice Shoes
- Photography – Robin Harper

== Certifications ==
Region	Certification	Certified units/sales
United States (RIAA)	Gold	500,000^{‡}
^{‡} Sales+streaming figures based on certification alone.
