= Ashley Everett =

American dancer and actress

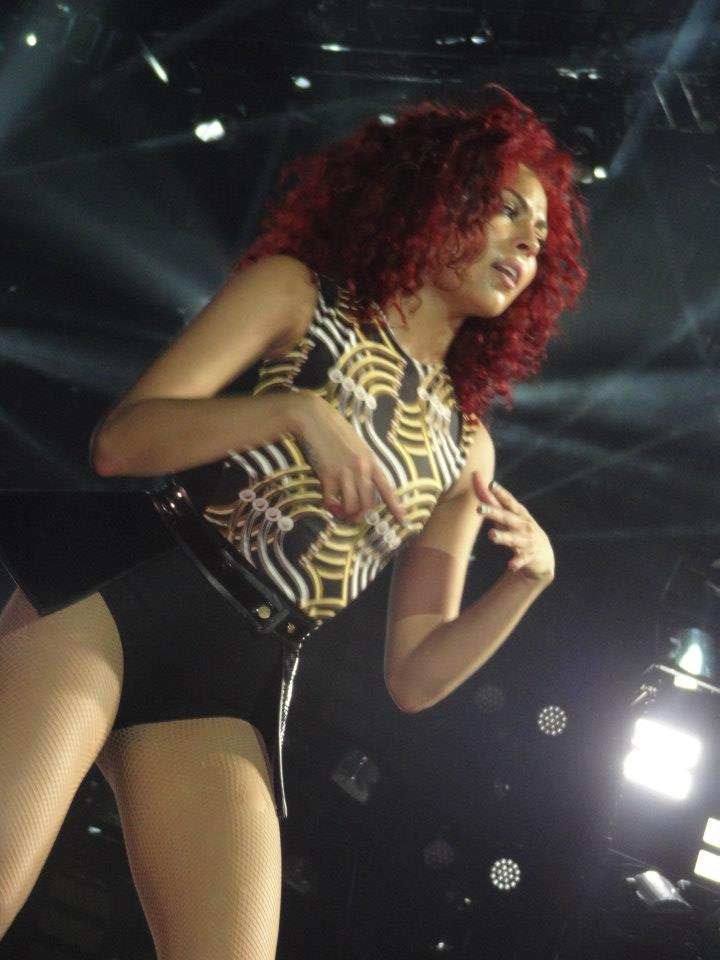
- Everett performing during The Mrs. Carter Show World Tour (2013-14)
- Born: Ashley Chrisha Marie Everett; April 19, 1989 (age 37); Chico, California U.S.
- Occupations: Dancer; Actress
- Years active: 2006–present
- Musical career
- Genres: Contemporary ballet; modern; jazz; street; hip-hop
- Website: www.ashleyeverett.com

Ashley Chrisha Marie Everett (born April 19, 1989) is an American dancer and actress. She is best known as lead backup dancer and dance captain for Beyoncé, and has worked with such artists as Taemin, Usher, Jennifer Lopez, Ne-Yo, Tina Turner, Ciara, Sean Paul and Anitta. She frequently features in high-profile music videos, television commercials and concert tours.

Everett's career began at age 16 when she met Beyoncé's choreographer Frank Gatson, Jr. while studying at the Alvin Ailey American Dance Theater in 2007. Later that year, Gatson Jr. gave Everett the chance to audition for Beyoncé. At age 17, she dropped out of the Juilliard School to join The Beyoncé Experience Tour, and in 2009 at the age of 19, she became dance captain. Everett has worked with Beyoncé on every major concert tour, many TV commercials, and has danced or acted in over 20 music videos with the singer. She also began to work with other music artists, and expanded her career into acting with a role in the third season of the VH1 series Hit the Floor, which aired in 2015.

In 2008, Everett was one of two featured dancers in the music video for "Single Ladies (Put a Ring on It)", which amassed over 685 million YouTube views and became known for its dancing and choreography. Other notable performances with Beyoncé include the 2013 Super Bowl XLVII halftime show, the 2016 Super Bowl 50 halftime show, and Coachella 2018. Distinguishable on stage by her curly, red afro, Everett has amassed a large following among Beyoncé's fan base. She trained as a contemporary ballet dancer as a child, and has also mastered various styles including tap, ballroom, jazz, and hip hop.

== Early life ==
Everett was born and raised in Chico, California. She is mixed race with her mother being African American and her father being White. Everett has stated that growing up in Chico was a challenge for her being mixed race, as "you don't fit in with White people because you're too dark and you don't fit in with the Black people because you're too light."

== Dance career ==
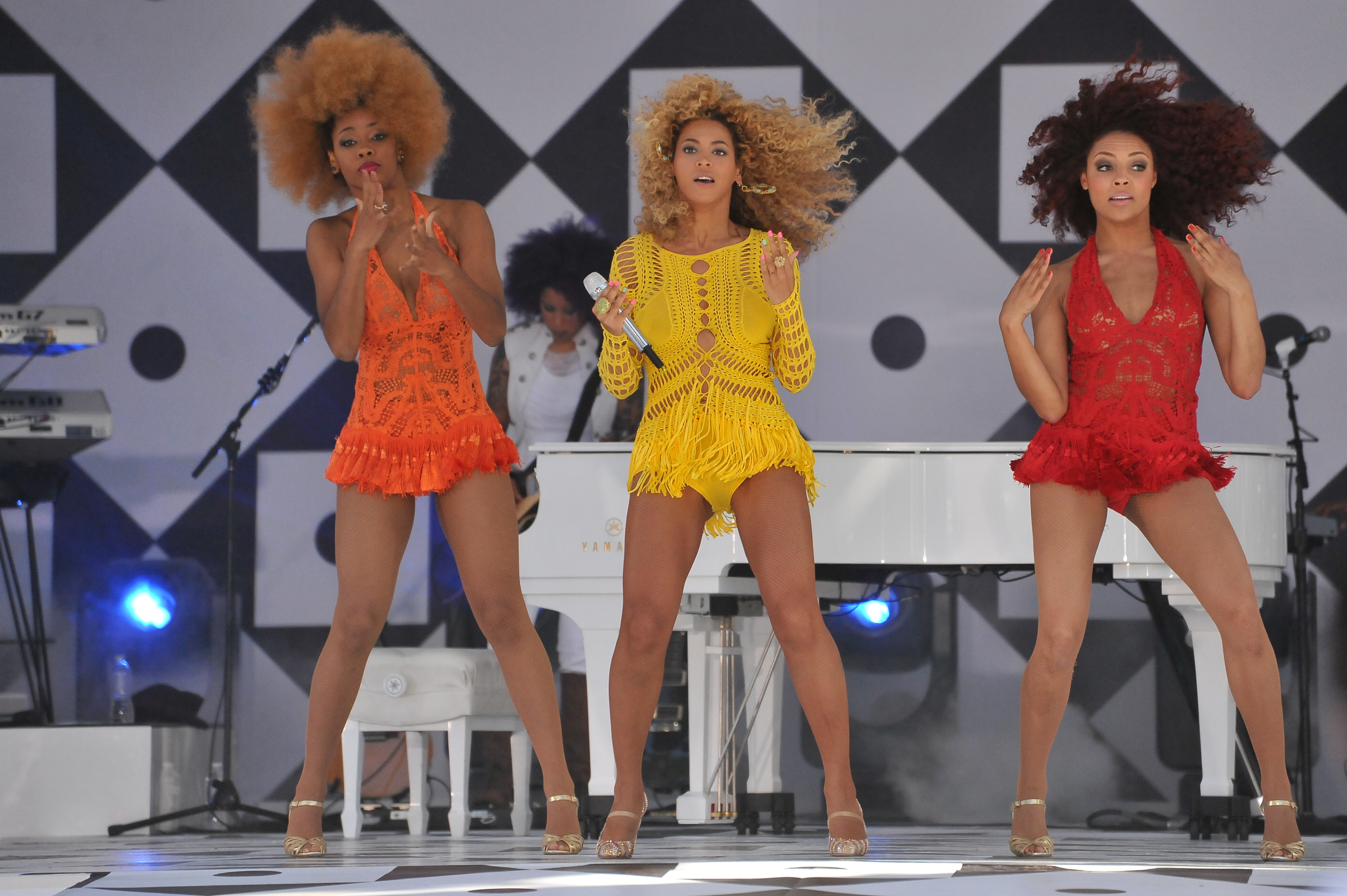
Everett (right) performing "Single Ladies (Put a Ring on It)" with Beyoncé on Good Morning America

Everett began dancing at the age of three years, originating in ballet, but also training in tap and jazz. At the age of sixteen, Everett moved to New York City to train at the Alvin Ailey American Dance Theater. During a training session here, Everett met Beyoncé's choreographer at the time, Frank Gatson, Jr. Around two months later, Everett attended an open audition for Beyoncé. Gatson remembered Everett and ultimately ended up landing her a job with Beyoncé.

At seventeen Everett started working with Beyoncé by dancing in music videos. Beyoncé was working on a video anthology album for B'Day (2006), and was filming multiple videos. Everett danced in "Green Light" and "Get Me Bodied". Following this, Everett began her first worldwide concert tour with The Beyoncé Experience (2007). Everett performed as a backup dancer for 96 shows. Prior to The Beyoncé Experience, Everett was accepted and enrolled into the Juilliard School, but ultimately decided against going, due to touring with Beyoncé and wanting to pursue her dance career this way.

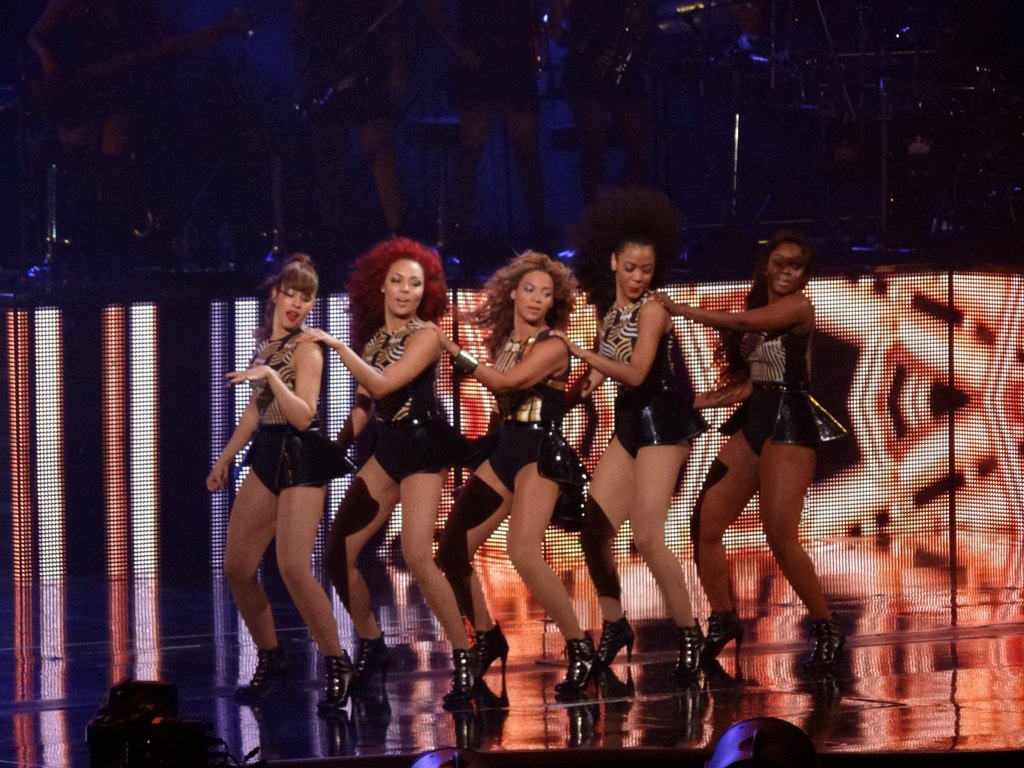
Everett (second from left) performing "Crazy in Love" with Beyoncé during The Mrs. Carter Show World Tour.

In 2008, Everett started by performing with one of her idols, Tina Turner, at the 2008 50th Annual Grammy Awards with Beyoncé. She featured in the video for "Love in This Club" by Usher and began a working relationship with him. In October of the same year, the video for "Single Ladies (Put a Ring on It)" was released, which featured a J-Setting choreography and contained only Beyoncé, Everett and dancer Ebony Williams. It has since gone viral, amassing over 580 million views and has been recreated thousands of times. It also won the MTV Video Music Award for Video of the Year. Everett featured in videos for both "Ego" and "Sweet Dreams" from I Am... Sasha Fierce (2008), and begun her second worldwide tour with Beyoncé, on the I Am... World Tour (2009–10). Here, Everett performed as the female Dance Captain for the entire tour. In 2010, Everett begun a working relationship with Ne-Yo and featured in three of his music videos from his album Libra Scale (2010); "One in a Million", "Champagne Life" and "Beautiful Monster". In 2011, Everett featured in three videos from Beyoncé's 4 (2011).

In 2012, Everett was also one of the dancers on Glee in season 4, episode 16 during Naya Rivera's performance of Cold Hearted Snake.

On February 3, 2013, Everett served as a lead backup dancer to the Super Bowl XLVII halftime show with Beyoncé. The performance was watched by 110.8 million Americans. Following the performance, Beyoncé announced The Mrs. Carter Show World Tour (2013–14), in which Everett would act as head Dance Captain for 132 shows. In the buildup to the tour, Everett featured in Life Is But a Dream, and television commercials airing worldwide for H&M and in the United Kingdom for O2. Everett appeared in six videos from Beyoncé's self-titled visual album, including a lead acting role in "Heaven". Two months after The Mrs. Carter Show concluded, Everett was announced as the lead Dance Captain for Jay-Z and Beyoncé's all stadium On the Run Tour (2014). Everett performed as a backup dancer for the majority of Usher's The UR Experience Tour (2014–15), however missed some shows due to filming Hit the Floor. In February 2016, Everett joined Beyoncé at the Super Bowl for a second time during the Super Bowl 50 halftime show, with Beyoncé and Bruno Mars acting as special guests for Coldplay's headlining performance. The performance was watched by 115.5 million people in America. Following the performance, The Formation World Tour was announced, a 49 date all stadium tour with Everett again serving as dance captain for Beyoncé.

Everett has also danced and worked with Robin Thicke, Ciara, La Toya Jackson and Jennifer Lopez.

== Acting ==
Everett featured in the pilot episode of Hit the Floor, as character Peyton. In late 2014 Everett stated she was filming for the upcoming third season of the series. In 2012 Everett featured in the finale episode of the second season of Shake It Up. In 2013, Everett starred with Beyoncé in the video to "Heaven" from the album Beyoncé (2013). The video is Everett's first non-dancing role with Beyoncé, and features Everett acting out a variety of "bucket list" scenarios with her on-screen best friend, Beyoncé. Everett has stated how she wants and hopes to get into more acting, including non-dancing roles. She stated in 2014, "Film and cinematography and stuff lasts forever and that's something that is really really great and really special to me. It'll last longer than I'm alive and my kids and my grandkids and their kids and their grandkids can always see me and that's what creates your legacy."

Outside of acting, Everett has appeared on television networks such as Fox 32 and WCIU-TV to be interviewed and teach news anchors dance moves, as well as promoting the relevant concert tours she was performing at on said interviews dates.

== Artistry ==
=== Dance style ===
Everett is professionally trained in contemporary ballet, and also trained in tap and jazz whilst growing in her craft. Her work with popular music artists such as Beyoncé and Ciara often sees Everett performing to a more hip-hop and street style of dance, although some elements of ballet are implemented into certain performances.

=== Public image ===
Everett is mostly recognized for her bright red hair, often styled as an afro. Everett stated that it was Beyoncé who originally asked her to dye her hair, and that although the continuous dying is damaging, it has become so recognized that it would be missed by fans if she changed it.

=== Influences ===
Everett has stated that her greatest dancing influence and most desired artist to work with is Janet Jackson. She also has named Michael Jackson if he was still alive and Justin Timberlake as other artists she would want to dance with. Everett also stated she is influenced and inspired by Beyoncé's work ethic.

== Videography ==
=== Music videos ===
All videos listed feature Everett either dancing or acting within them.

Year	Music video	Artist(s)	Director(s)	Reference(s)
2007	"Green Light"	Beyoncé	Melina Matsoukas	
2007	"Get Me Bodied"	Beyoncé	Anthony Mandler	
2008	"Love in This Club"	Usher	Brothers Strause	
2008	"Single Ladies (Put a Ring on It)"	Beyoncé	Jake Nava	
2009	"Ego" + Remix feat. Kanye West	Beyoncé	Beyoncé and Frank Gatson, Jr.	
2009	"Sweet Dreams"	Beyoncé	Adria Petty	
2010	"One in a Million"	Ne-Yo	Wayne Isham	
2010	"Champagne Life"	Ne-Yo	Wayne Isham	
2010	"Beautiful Monster"	Ne-Yo	Wayne Isham	
2011	"Run the World (Girls)"	Beyoncé	Francis Lawrence	
2011	"Countdown"	Beyoncé	Adria Petty and Beyoncé	
2011	"Dance for You"	Beyoncé	Beyoncé and Alan Ferguson	
2012	"Got Me Good"	Ciara	Joseph Kahn	
2012	"Make Love to Me"	Luke James	Frank Gatson Jr.	
2013	"Haunted"	Beyoncé	Jonas Akerlund	
2013	"Blow"	Beyoncé	Hype Williams	
2013	"Mine"	Beyoncé (feat. Drake)	Pierre Debusschere	
2013	"Superpower"	Beyoncé (feat. Frank Ocean)	Jonas Akerlund	
2013	"Heaven"	Beyoncé	Beyoncé and Todd Tourso	
2013	"Grown Woman"	Beyoncé	Jake Nava	
2015	"Feeling Myself"	Nicki Minaj (feat. Beyoncé)		
2016	"Formation"	Beyoncé	Melina Matsoukas	
2016	"Sorry"	Beyoncé	Beyoncé and Kahlil Joseph	
2016	"Don't Hurt Yourself"	Beyoncé	Various	
2016	"Love Drought"	Beyoncé	Various	
2016	"Freedom"	Beyoncé	Various	
2016	"All Night"	Beyoncé	Various	
2018	"Apeshit"	The Carters	Ricky Saiz	
2019	"Fuego"	DJ Snake, Sean Paul, Anitta and Tainy	Colin Tilley	
2021	"How Will I Know"	Whitney Houston, Clean Bandit	Ezra Hurwitz	

=== Television/Documentary ===
Year	TV show	Role	Notes
2008	50th Annual Grammy Awards	Herself	Backup dancing for Beyoncé and Tina Turner
2008	The Ellen DeGeneres Show	Herself	Lead backup dancer for the performance of "Single Ladies (Put a Ring on It)"
2009	2009 MTV Video Music Awards	Herself	Lead dancer for the performance of "Single Ladies (Put a Ring on It)"
2009	2009 MTV Europe Music Awards	Herself	Backup dancer for the performance of "Sweet Dreams"
2011	Beyoncé: Year of 4	Herself	Everett is seen in behind the scenes rehearsal and video footage for "Run the World (Girls)".
2011	X Factor France	Herself	Backup dancer for the performance of "Run the World (Girls)".
2011	Good Morning America: Summer Concert Series	Herself	Lead backup dancer to a variety of performances with Beyoncé.
2011	Glastonbury Festival	Herself	Everett is a lead backup dancer for the duration of the 90 minute performance.
2011	A Night with Beyoncé	Herself	ITV music special, in which Everett is a lead backup dancer.
2012	Shake It Up		Role in the finale episode of season 2, ""Made in Japan".
2013	Super Bowl XLVII halftime show	Herself	Everett performed as a lead backup dancer for the halftime show. The performance was viewed by 110.8 million Americans.
2013	Life Is But a Dream	Herself	Everett is seen in multiple scenes of the documentary, including during and behind the scenes of performances.
2013	Hit the Floor	Peyton	Pilot episode and has filmed for the upcoming third season.
2013	You and Me This Morning	Herself	Interview on You and Me This Morning to talk about the at the time upcoming Mrs. Carter Show World Tour show in Chicago.
2014	Good Day Chicago	Herself	Interview on Good Day Chicago with fellow dance captain Kimberly Gipson, to talk about the at the time upcoming On the Run Tour show in Chicago.
2014	2014 MTV Video Music Awards	Herself	Lead backup dancer. Performed as part of a 15-minute medley of Beyoncé (2013).
2014	On the Run Tour: Beyoncé and Jay-Z	Herself	HBO special that aired on September 20, 2014. Everett is seen multiple times and acts as lead backup dancer for the duration.
2015	Crazy Ex-Girlfriend	Dancer	Everett performed as a backup dancer in one of the show's musical numbers.
2016	Super Bowl 50 halftime show	Herself	Everett performed as a backup dancer to Beyoncé, who was a guest appearance to Coldplay who were headlining.
2018	Coachella	Herself	Everett performed as dance captain.

=== Commercials ===
Year	Commercial	Notes
2013	O2	Promoting The Mrs. Carter World Tour in the United Kingdom. Everett is seen backup dancing.
2013	H&M	Filmed in the Bahamas, to promote Beyoncé's 2013 H&M summer collection. Everett is seen backup dancing.
2015	Target	Everett is seen dancing in the commercial for Target to promote their denim-wear clothing line.
2016	Ivy Park	Everett is seen working out and exercising in a variety of non-dancing scenarios, along with Beyoncé and others, sporting Beyoncé and Topshop's athletic wear clothing line, Ivy Park.

== Tours and residencies ==
Year	Tour/residency name	Number of shows	Role
2007	The Beyoncé Experience	96	Backup dancer
2009-10	I Am... World Tour	107	Female Dance Captain
2009	I Am... Yours	4	Female Dance Captain and additional choreographer
2011	4 Intimate Nights with Beyoncé	4	Female Dance Captain
2012	Revel Presents: Beyoncé Live	4	Female Dance Captain
2013-14	The Mrs. Carter Show World Tour	132	Female Dance Captain
2014	On the Run Tour	21	Dance Captain
2014-15	The UR Experience Tour	50	Backup dancer
2016	The Formation World Tour	49	Dance Captain
2018	On the Run II Tour	48	Dance Captain
