= The Mrs. Carter Show World Tour =

2013–2014 concert tour by Beyoncé

- World tour by Beyoncé
- Promotional poster for the tour
- Location: Europe; North America; Oceania; South America
- Associated albums: Beyoncé (Note: 2014 European leg only)
- Start date: April 15, 2013
- End date: March 27, 2014
- No. of shows: 132
- Box office: $229.7 million ($312.39 million in 2025 dollars)

Beyoncé concert chronology
- Revel Presents: Beyoncé Live (2012); The Mrs. Carter Show World Tour (2013–14); On the Run Tour (2014)

The Mrs. Carter Show World Tour was the fourth concert tour by American singer-songwriter Beyoncé. Announced in February 2013 with initial dates in Europe and North America, the tour contained seven legs and 132 shows. It began in Belgrade, Serbia, on April 15, 2013, and concluded in Lisbon, Portugal, on March 27, 2014.

The tour featured royal themes with Beyoncé emulating different queens through her fashion for which she collaborated with numerous designers and fashion houses. The set list of the shows in 2013 included songs from all four studio albums of Beyoncé's solo career. After the release of her eponymous fifth studio album, the 2014 shows were changed to incorporate tracks from the album. The tour was lauded by music critics who praised Beyoncé for her energetic performances, dancing and vocal abilities. The show was directed and choreographed by Frank Gatson Jr.

Following the announcement of the tour, all the tickets made available for the shows sold out, which prompted more dates to be added to the itinerary. The tour grossed $188.6 million in 2013 and the 2014 shows grossed $41.1 million, bringing the tour's total gross revenue to $229.7 million. This made The Mrs. Carter Show World Tour the highest-grossing female and solo tour of 2013. Performances of a number of songs from the tour were broadcast and behind-the-scenes footage was released.

== Background ==
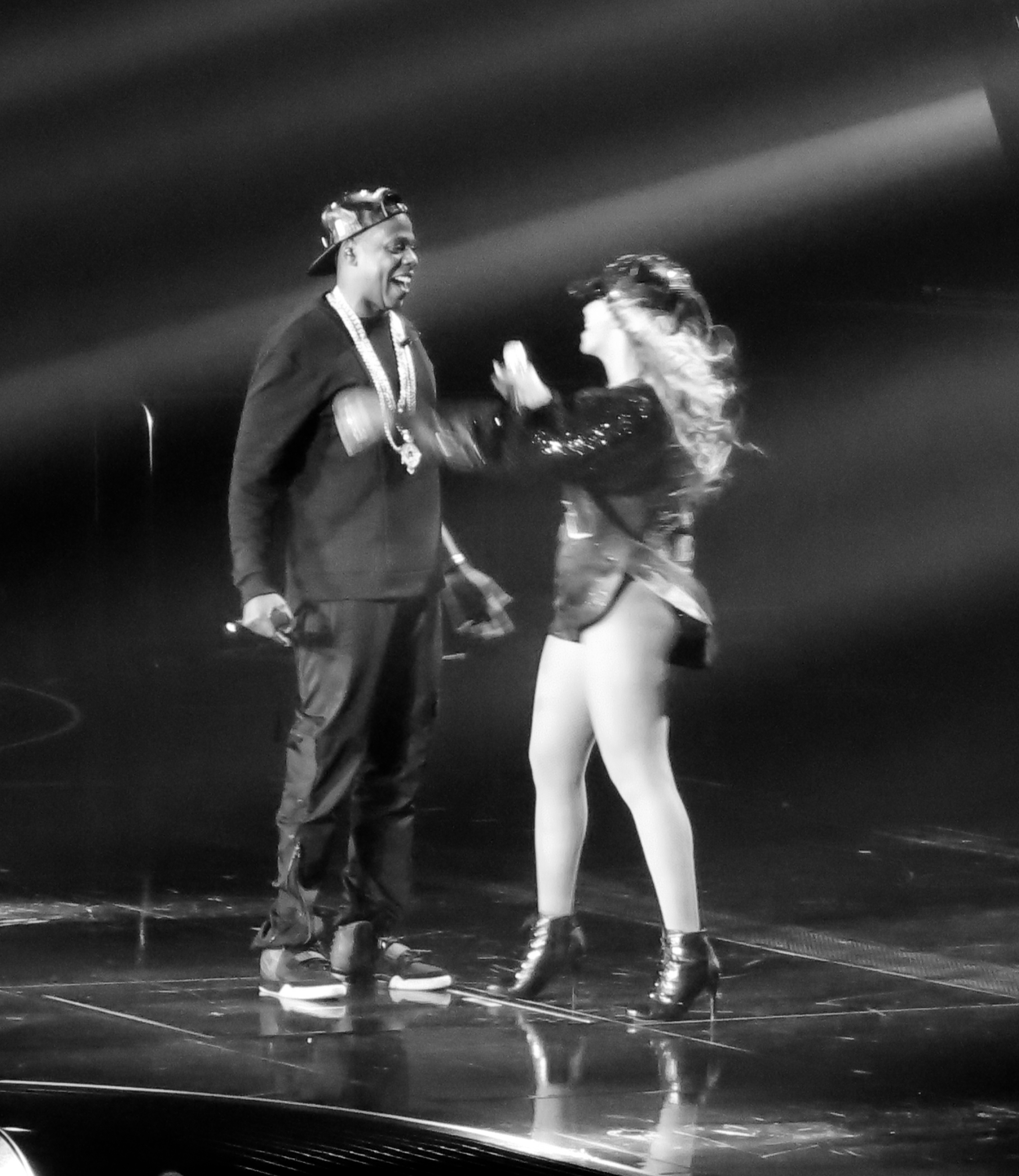
Beyoncé's husband Jay-Z (real name Shawn Carter) served as an inspiration for the title of the tour.

During a press conference for Super Bowl XLVII on January 31, 2013, Beyoncé revealed that she would make an announcement after her performance at the halftime show and added that "fans should just stay tuned to see". Beyoncé announced the tour and its name after her performance the Super Bowl XLVII halftime show on February 3. The tour's title refers to her marriage with Shawn 'Jay-Z' Carter. However, the official poster of the tour with the name written on it was leaked on the ticket's website Live Nation prior to the official announcement. It shows Beyoncé wearing a Victorian golden royal top and a crown, referencing Queen Elizabeth I. Rosie Swash of The Guardian described it as a "visual stamp of authority". Along with the tour's name, initial dates in Europe and North America were announced, and later more were added in Latin America, Australia, and New Zealand.

Following the announcement of the tour's title, Beyoncé was criticized by several critics and feminists alike for entitling it after her husband's name as she has been regarded as a feminist. Questions were raised about how Beyoncé agreed to be known as a bride of another celebrity person. During an interview with Vogue, Beyoncé described herself as a "modern-day feminist" and further spoke about her decision to reference her husband's name: "I feel like Mrs. Carter is who I am, but more bold and more fearless than I've ever been..... It comes from knowing my purpose and really meeting myself once I saw my child. I was like, 'OK, this is what you were born to do'. The purpose of my body became completely different." After the second European leg was announced on December 11, 2013, a new poster was revealed and used for the promotion of all the newly added shows.

== Development ==
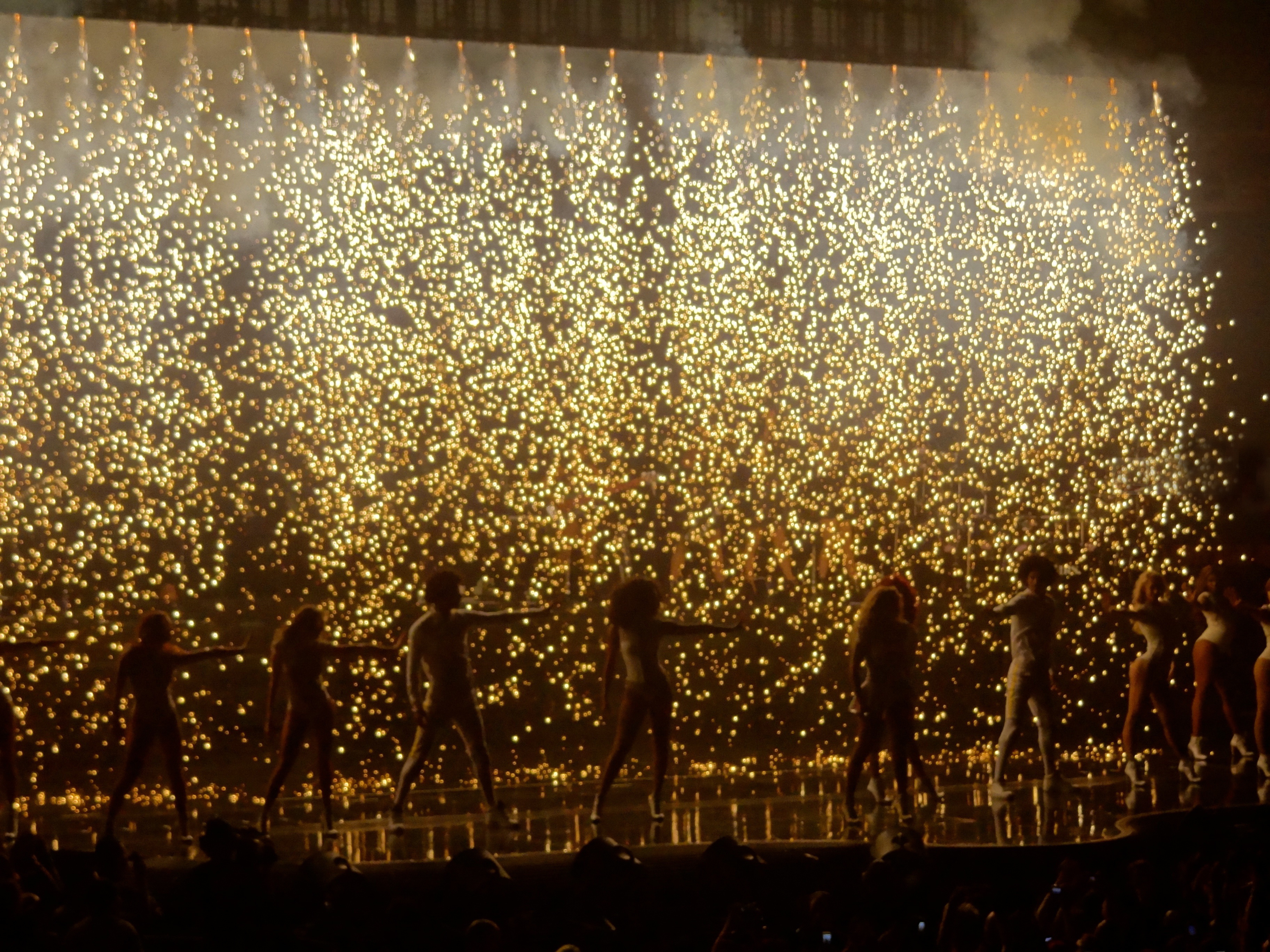
Beyoncé performing "End of Time" with the French dancing duo Les Twins and her background dancers as pyrotechnics fall on stage

The concert at The O_{2} Arena in London was announced on February 3, along with a short advertisement for the tour; an extended version of the clip appeared in late February. Beyoncé was dressed in a golden corset and a royal gown to whoo the crowd. She is seen walking into a dance hall in slow-motion with several servants and a DJ, dressed as a jester tries to distract her. The end of the advertisement shows black-and-white snippets of behind-the-scenes footage of the video. Alexis L. Loinaz of E! compared her aristocratic look in the video to Marie Antoinette, Queen Elizabeth I, and Lady Gaga. In March 2013, Beyoncé posted a new poster for the tour on her official Facebook page showing her striking four different poses, wearing a blond wig, a white top and blue shorts. In May 2013, Beyoncé launched an online store for the tour in which different clothes were available for purchase. The following month, she added a limited edition to her Heat line of perfumes, titled Heat: The Mrs. Carter Show World Tour. Inspired by the tour, Beyoncé stated that the fragrance was meant to "give them [fans] a special remembrance of this tour and... reflect the power, passion and playfulness I put into my performances".

On April 24, 2013, it was announced by Beyoncé's publicist that all photographers except Beyoncé's personal photographer Frank Micelotta, were banned from the tour stating that "no photo credentials" will be present. The ban was interpreted as a reaction to the "unflattering" pictures from Beyoncé's Super Bowl XLVII halftime performance showing her "jubilant exertions", that appeared on websites such as Gawker and BuzzFeed. The pictures were not removed even after her publicist Yvette Noel-Schure asked the websites through an e-mail to change their articles, using "some better photos". On May 13, 2013, the general counsel of the National Press Photographers Association (NPPA) Mickey H. Osterreicher, wrote a letter to Noel-Schure on behalf of 19 other organizations requesting from him to "immediately revise your guidelines to restore photo credentialing" for the rest of the tour in Europe and the US. For the tour, the singer took part in "Miss A Meal", a food-donation campaign and supported the charity Goodwill during her tour, where fans were asked to bring food, clothes and household goods at the stops. Throughout the tour, an auction for the campaign was held by Beyoncé and her mother, Tina Knowles, on the website Charitybuzz in which the auction value was $25,000. The winner got a chance to work behind the scenes of Beyoncé's concert in Los Angeles and assist Knowles in the wardrobe department, got a VIP ticket for the concert and had a personal meeting with the singer.

Eight hundred dancers auditioned to be included in Beyoncé's performance at the Super Bowl XLVII halftime show and a selected group of them, consisting only of females, were chosen for the performance as well as for the tour. French dancing duo Les Twins also accompanied Beyoncé on stage performing street dances. Three backing singers The Mamas, and an eleven-piece female band who had also supported the singer during her previous tours performed during the concerts. Two stages were used during the performances: a main stage where the singer performed throughout most of the concert and a B-stage closer to the audience where she was transferred with a rope, flying over the crowd midway through the set, performing three songs there. The set list of the 2013 portion of the tour included approximately twenty five songs from Beyoncé's four solo studio albums: Dangerously in Love (2003), B'Day (2006), I Am... Sasha Fierce (2008), and 4 (2011). The majority of the songs originated from 4 – seven songs were performed from that album. Many elements from the 2012 Revel Presents: Beyoncé Live residency, such as the stage design, visual interludes and musical arrangements, were adapted for use on this tour. For the 2014 shows, many previously performed songs were removed from the set list, and were replaced with eight new songs from Beyoncé's self-titled fifth studio album.

== Fashion ==
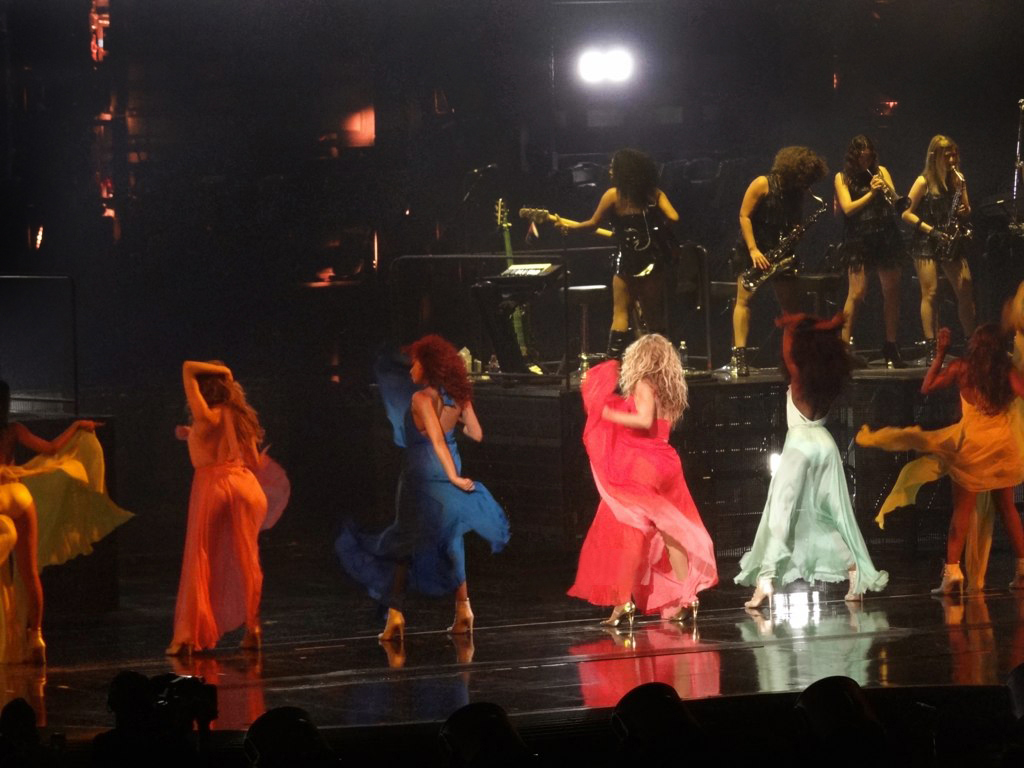
Beyoncé and her female dancers performing "Freakum Dress" during a concert. For the performance of the song they wore long dresses in different colours.

For the 2013 shows, Beyoncé worked with multiple designers for the tour's costumes including Emilio Pucci, Riccardo Tisci from Givenchy, The Blonds, Julien MacDonald, Dean and Dan Caten (DSQUARED^{2}), creative director Tamara Ralph of Ralph & Russo who was personally requested by the singer to design an outfit, David Koma, Alon Livne, Vrettos Vrettakos designers from Kenzo, Gucci, Roberto Cavalli and Dennis Kolpodinos. For the performance at the 2013 Made in America, Beyoncé wore a new costume designed by Timothy White, accompanied with shoes made by Reed Krakoff. The outfit designed by DSQUARED^{2} was from their spring/summer 2013 collection at the Glamazon catwalk show and was inspired by models of the '90s. Several costumes were also designed by Emilio Pucci's Peter Dundas who described them as a "modern take on glamour", taking them from his fall/winter 2013 collection. He focused on the singer being able to perform the choreography during her performances. Stuart Weitzman designed the shoes for Beyoncé, her back-up dancers and band collaborating with stylists Ty Hunter, Raquel Smith, and Beyoncé's mother Tina Knowles. Weitzman created them in different colors with military elements. Beyoncé wanted Weitzman to focus on her being able to dance wearing the shoes without noticing they were on her feet.

One of Beyoncé's costumes which was worn during the first concerts was a gold bodysuit, designed by The Blonds, embellished with golden breast-cups with a complete nipple detail. The costume was a collaboration between the designers, Beyoncé herself, her mother, and Hunter. It was hand embroidered in 600 hours with approximately 30,000 Swarovski crystals. According to The Blonds, it was meant to give the illusion of being covered in crystallized honey and reflect Beyoncé's personality for the tour. They were inspired by Beyoncé's songs of female empowerment and female nudes painted by Tamara de Lempicka. The costume received wide media and fan attention and divided critics' opinions. InStyle's Meghan Blalock described the costume as the "most scandalous" that the singer has worn in her career. For the 2014 shows, the singer wore numerous new designs collaborating again with DSQUARED^{2}, Givenchy, Pucci and Weitzman as well as with new designers such as Tom Ford, Versace and Karen Langley.

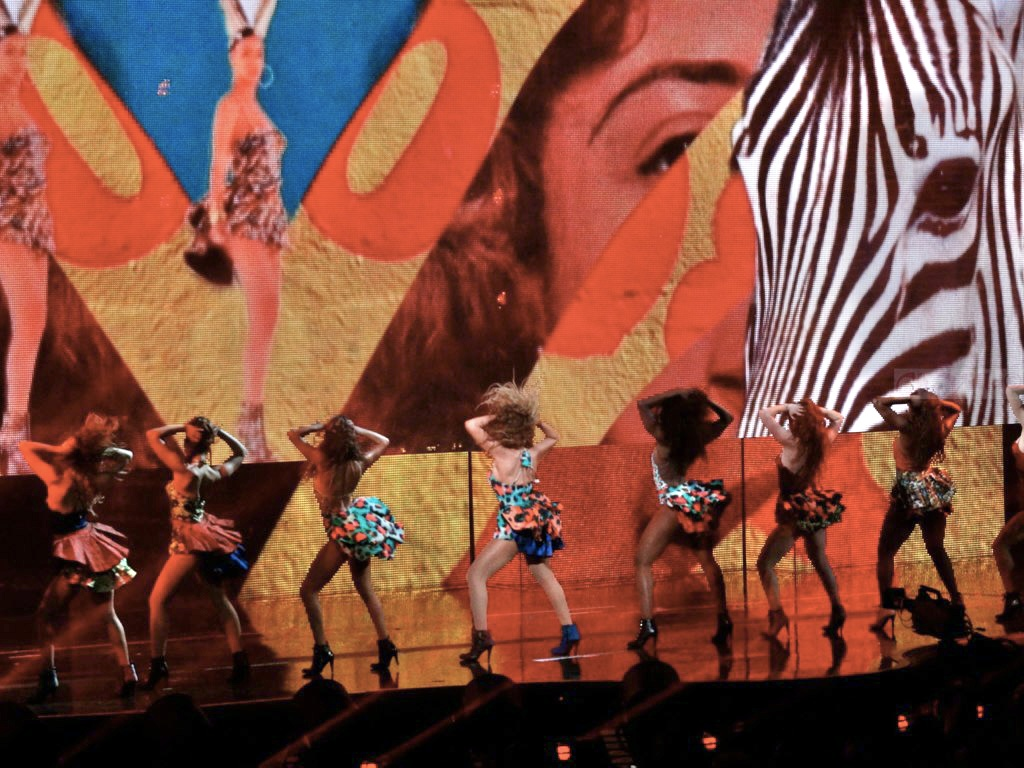
Beyoncé performing "Grown Woman" with her female dancers, in various animal-print dresses (such as zebra, leopard and giraffe-inspired prints). The video screens also featured African scenery, wildlife and fashions.

Beyoncé's makeup for the tour focused on trying to emulate cosmic stars with the underlying themes based on the stratosphere. Other references used as inspiration for the makeup included: film noir, 60's London, cyber beauty, cosmic constellations, and felines. The tourbook for The Mrs. Carter Show was meant to artistically illustrate all the different visual aspects of the tour through multi-media collage and image manipulation. By using collage, Beyoncé's team created images inspired by the singer and her songs and image manipulation was explored, with photos being solarized, layered and stacked. With the tourbook, fans had an opportunity to "bring a part of the tour home with them", as Beyoncé's team stated. A dress created by Amato Haute Couture's Furne One which was worn by Beyoncé for the tour book was originally designed and worn by Estonian singer-songwriter Kerli during her Utopia EP photoshoot, who praised the look after seeing it.

The concert included many costume changes during which video interludes were projected on the screen during the singer's absence. An 18th Century France influence was found in the white-powder makeup and the opening costume as well as a Louis XVI theme throughout the show with oversized wigs and bustiers. The dresses and looks were also noted to channel queens Marie Antionette, Cleopatra, and Elizabeth I by several critics. The Observer's Kitty Empire described the concert as a fashion show with a regal, Dangerous Liaisons theme. Jocelyn Vena of MTV News described the costumes as "Eye-catching... dazzling... [and] provocative". Rosa Silverman of The Daily Telegraph commented that Beyoncé was "mesmerizing the crowds with her showstopping outfits... she took to the stage in a series of racy costumes that made no attempt to hide her famous curves." Erika Ramirez of Billboard commented that most of Beyoncé's "stunning" costumes were dazzled with sequins.

== Concert synopsis ==
=== 2013 shows ===
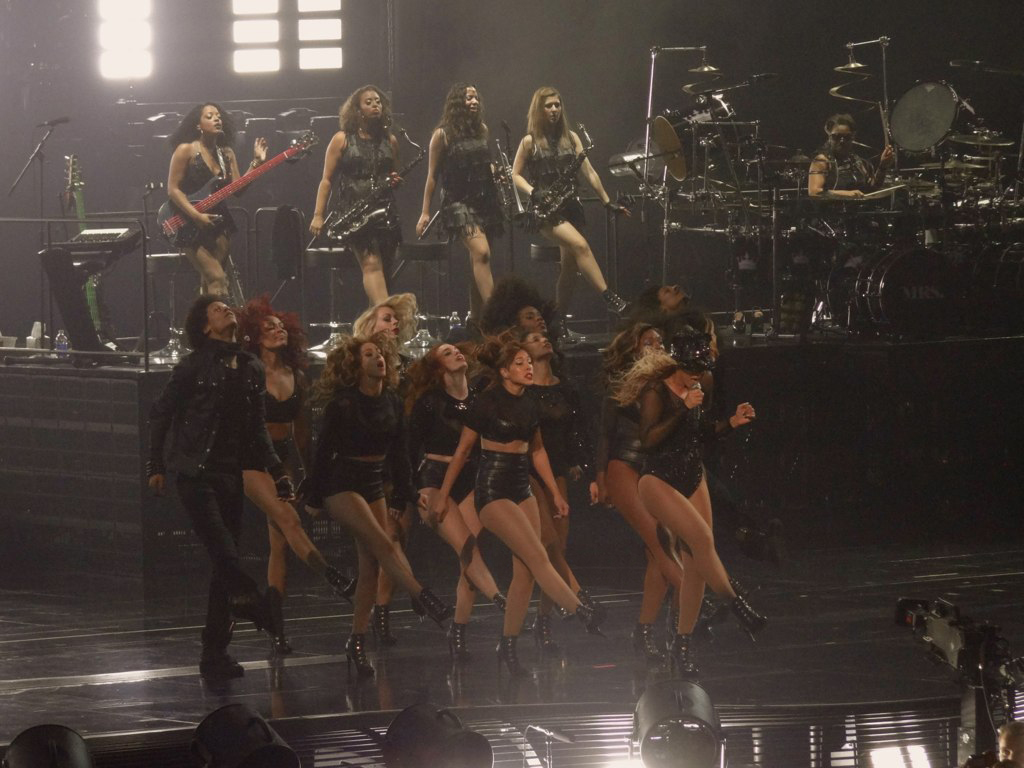
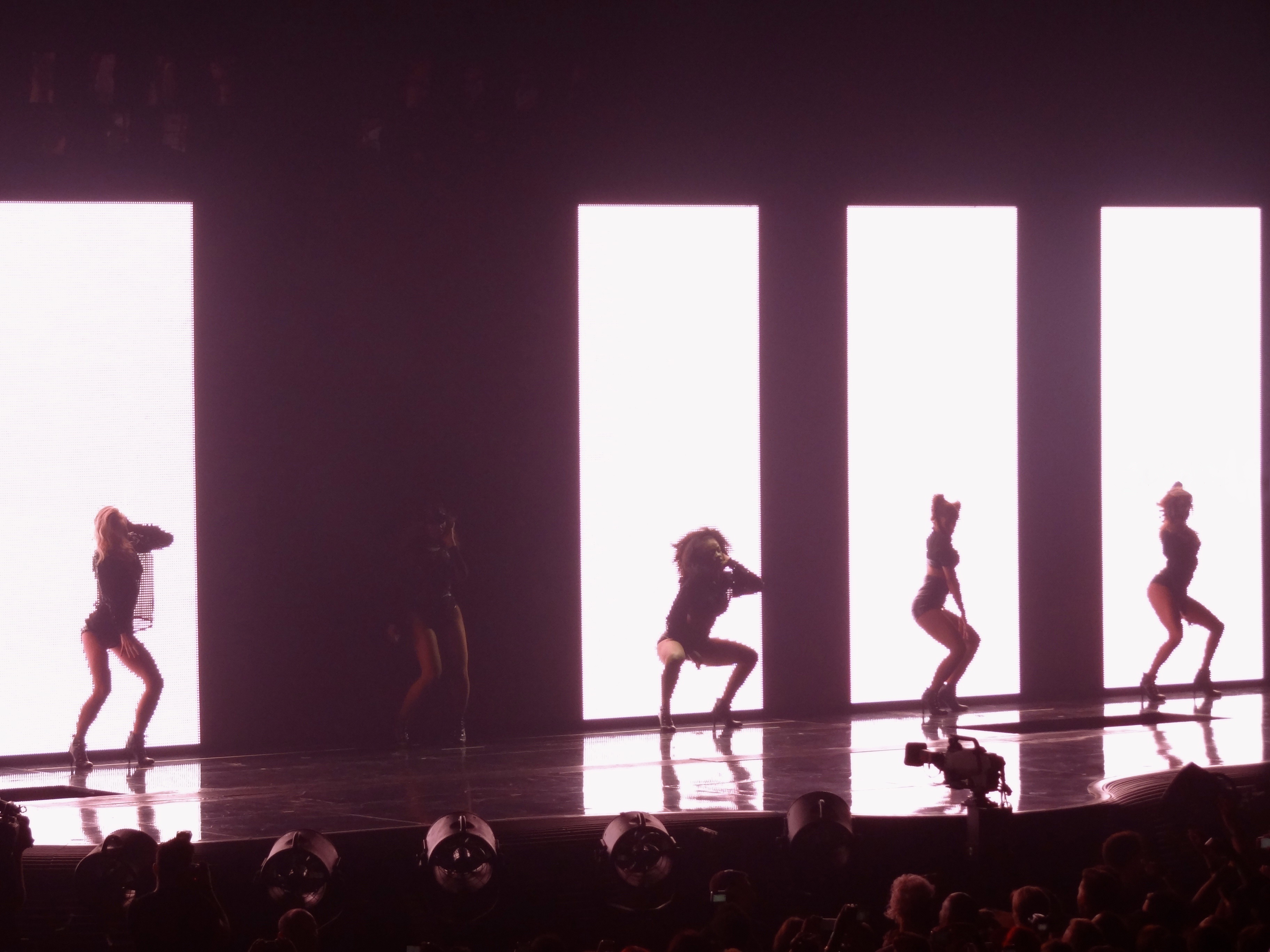
Immediately after Beyoncé finished the performance of "Get Me Bodied" with her background dancers (left), they moved in front of a holographic background, continuing with "Baby Boy" (right).

The concert opened with a pre-recorded video montage showing black and white footage of gothic architecture as well as dancers dressed in white, marching across a stage length screen, preparing to crown Beyoncé who was dressed as a queen. The montage continued as female dancers wearing hoop-skirt cages and masks started appearing on stage. The video wall raised afterwards and a brief pyrotechnics display began as Beyoncé appeared onstage standing for several seconds prior to the performance of "Run the World (Girls)" preceded by an extended timpani interlude. She sang the song while performing a choreography which included a routine of faux kicking her male dancers. "End of Time" followed with Beyoncé dancing as fireworks were also displayed on stage. "Flaws and All" was performed as the third song on the set list with Beyoncé dedicating it to her fan group, the BeyHive. "If I Were a Boy" was mashed with The Verve's song "Bitter Sweet Symphony" taking the latter's string motif and incorporating several lines. "Get Me Bodied" saw Beyoncé interacting with the audience through call and response, asking them to repeat "Hey, Mrs. Carter". "Baby Boy" was performed against a holographic background as Beyoncé and several female dancers performed synchronised moves in front of the screen which flashed realistic images of more identical dancers. The singer concluded the song with a Dutty Wine dance at the end of the performance, before immediately continuing with "Diva" which was set to the groove of "Clique". "Naughty Girl" was later performed into a neon strip-lit with a snippet of Donna Summer's "Love to Love You Baby" interpolated within it. Beyoncé also performed a seductive dance in front of an open fire display onstage. "Party" was performed after with a prominent Las Vegas showgirl theme. For "Freakum Dress" two ballerinas appeared on stage and performed a choreography along with a video projection on the screen. Beyoncé later appeared in a deep-plunging, thigh-high split long red dress performing the song along with her dancers.

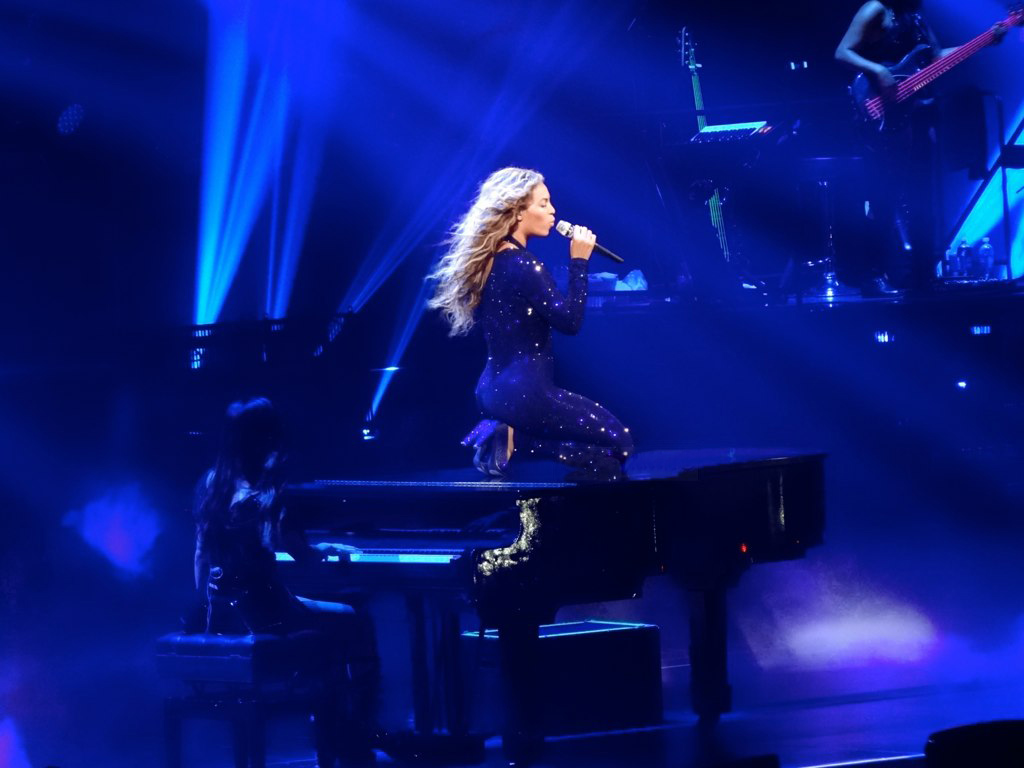
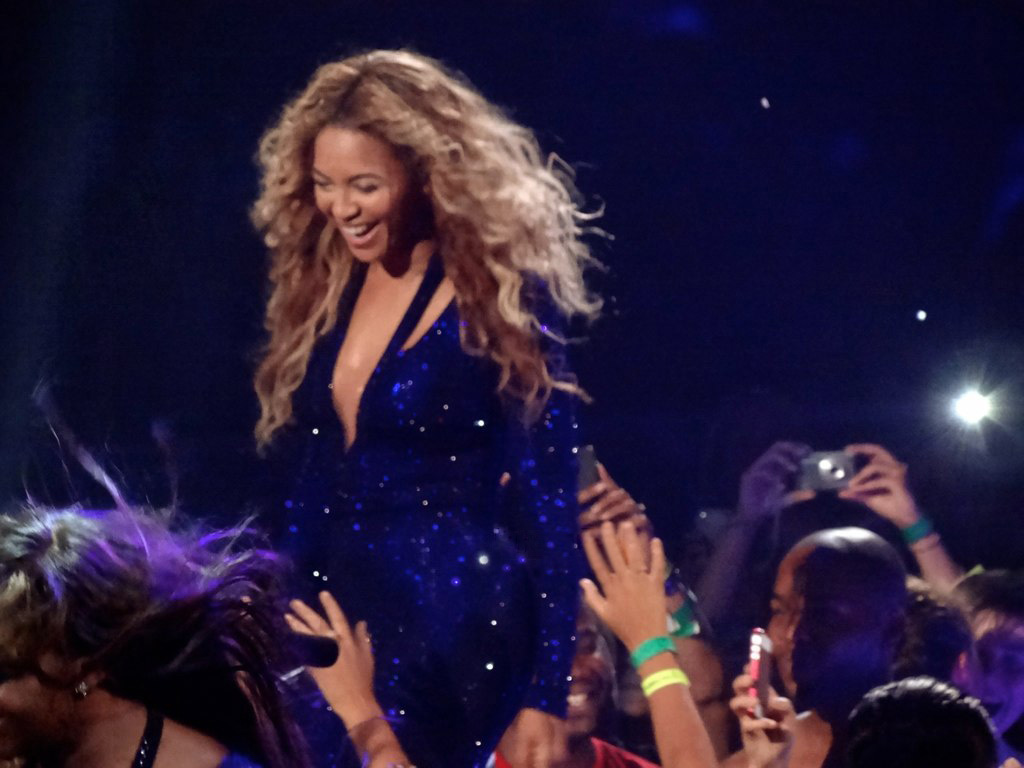
Beyoncé performing "1+1" seated on a piano. After the performance of the song, she flew with a wire to a B-stage, closer to the people in the crowd (right).

For "I Care" the singer was dressed in a black leather fedora, seated on a bar stool. Beyoncé sang "I Miss You" while shadow dancing was illustrated on the screen behind her. "Schoolin' Life" was performed with a light show complete with '80s neon lights while she performed a dance routine with her dancers. An uptempo version of "Why Don't You Love Me" with a choreography by Beyoncé and Les Twins was preceded by a video projection showing a vintage montage of her. The singer performed the song with a call and response interaction between her and the audience dressed in a 1920s fringed dress. The performance of "1+1" saw Beyoncé in a blue cat-suit kneeling and laying atop a grand piano. During the end of "1+1", she was transformed from the main stage to the "Bey-stage", located closer to the crowd with a wire through a cloud of glitter. "Irreplaceable" was performed after that with an audience sing-along. "Love on Top" and an abbreviated version of Destiny's Child's "Survivor" followed; Beyoncé dedicated the latter song to the members of the aforementioned girl group, Kelly Rowland and Michelle Williams. Beyoncé was taken back to the main stage being transferred with the same wire. "Crazy in Love" was the first song performed on the main stage with a new brassy arrangement, different from Beyoncé's other live performances of the song. During "Single Ladies (Put a Ring on It)", she integrated a snippet from the song "Movin' on Up". Images of pyramids, animated lions and elephants and a portrait of the singer wearing a Nefertiti-style crown were displayed on the screen before the performance of "Grown Woman", keeping in line with the song's African influence. During the performance, the singer and her dancers wore African-inspired costumes. A montage was shown with the song "I Was Here" being played in the background showing footage of the singer with Barack Obama, taking part in charity work, during a vacation with Jay-Z and excerpts of her 2013 performance at the Super Bowl. An a cappella performance of the opening lines of "I Will Always Love You" preceded "Halo" as the closing song of the concert. "Green Light" and "Suga Mama" were used for the encore of the concert at numerous stops.

=== 2014 shows ===
The performances of the songs that had already been performed during the 2013 shows remained the same; however some of them were shortened and mixed together. Many new songs from the singer's fifth album were added to the set list with a specific staging and theme. The projections shown on the stage followed the concept behind the singer's visual album. The performance of "Flawless", the second song on the set, opened with the words from Chimamanda Ngozi Adichie's TED talk projected with big letters on the screen and later Beyoncé performed a choreography with her female dancers similarly to the song's music video. A performance of "Yoncé" followed with a new choreography with her dancers. "Blow" was merged with "Naughty Girl" (2003) and featured a burlesque and disco-era theme. During the end of the performance a projection of Pac-Man, the character of the game with the same name, eating cherries was projected on an LED screen onstage. "Partition" was performed in a similar fashion to its music video with Beyoncé appearing with a silhouette, dancing on a couch in front of a purple light. For "Drunk in Love", the singer performed a choreographed chair dance. During "Haunted", strobing lights and dancers were present on stage. "Heaven" and "XO" were performed as the concert's last songs along with "Halo".

== Critical reception ==
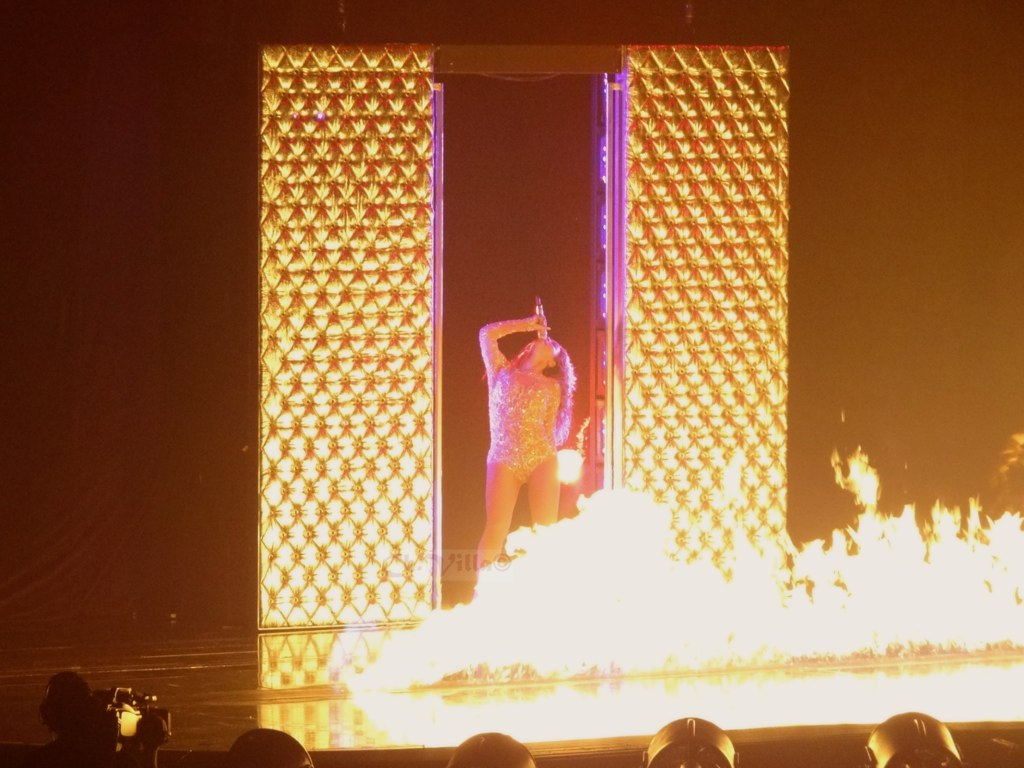
Beyoncé performing "Naughty Girl" with onstage pyrotechnics

Mike Wass from the website Idolator called the show a "concert extravaganza in the style of Michael Jackson or Madonna" praising the fact that the singer made a progress in the production values compared with her previous performances, mostly due to the expensive and high-quality visual projections which "create atmosphere and add another layer to the production". He further praised the singer's "extraordinary talent" during the performances hailing her as "the greatest entertainer of her generation" after seeing the show which showcased "an icon at top of her game". Tiffany Poole from The Oklahoman praised the fashion, video backdrops and "some of the most impersonated dance moves on YouTube" concluding, "To say that Beyoncé puts on a good show would be grossly understated." Billboard writer Gail Mitchell hailed the concert as a "musical and visual extravaganza" complete with a kaleidoscope of colorful imagery and dancing, which according to him enhanced the music complete with the singer's strong vocals, rather than overshadowing it. He concluded that the tour claimed "the multi-talented artist's intent to join the rarefied ranks of ultimate entertainer".

Nick Hasted of The Independent wrote that the tour followed the stadium trends containing "big-budget movie clips and Broadway musical dance moves, with platoons of backing singers and dancers acting as extras" further hailing it as a "Cecil B. DeMille spectacle". He finished his reviews by concluding, "what makes this show's largely enervating juggernaut breathe is Beyoncé's tireless physical effort. She has created a literal body of work". Alexis Petridis of The Guardian who compared the singer's performance with Tina Turner praised the show's "bombastic" opening and wrote that "there's something powerful and relentless" about it. He concluded "while onstage Beyoncé feels weirdly unassailable". Mikael Wood of Los Angeles Times noted, "What left the deepest impression was something far more elemental: Beyoncé's ability to make self-aggrandizement seem like an expression of humility... [Her] ambition seemed in proportion with her fans' expectations; she came by the sense of scale honestly." The Observer's Kitty Empire highlighted the art direction of the show as "nothing short of breathtaking, making awesome and repeated use of silhouette, of great white blocks of video screens, of live dancers interacting with video". She praised the singer's "fierce" tireless dancing and concluded, "But for all the hauteur here, in couture and bearing, Beyoncé delivers genuine warmth at close range." Bernadette McNulty from The Daily Telegraph found "air of an ancient goddess worship ceremony... [and] of an expensive revue show" in the concert. Although she felt that the choreographies often outshined the music, McNulty concluded: "Yet Beyonce was never less than compelling to watch, and often blistering in her vocal attack".

Philip Matusavage of musicOMH praised Beyoncé's abilities to perform live, calling her "insanely talented" and considered the performance at the B-stage a show highlight; however he commented that the production values of the show, consisting solely of a video screen were "relatively low-key" compared to other pop arena concerts. Matusavage further criticized the repetition of the songs and dance routines which had been previously performed during the singer's other concerts as the tour's "most notable problem". Shirley Halperin of The Hollywood Reporter felt that the singer "tore through her... set with the ferocity of a grown woman who has something to prove" and felt that she tried "her damnedest to win the crowd over with an equal dose of sex appeal and good old-fashioned hyping" further showcasing "unequaled showmanship and those killer vocals" which placed her at the top of R&B music.

However Halperin criticized the show's set list mainly due to the majority of the songs from the album 4, writing, "Bey sounded terrific on all, of course, but with a... ready-to-party audience angling to groove in the aisles, rather than sway with their hands to the heavens, overall it missed the mark." Digital Spy's Robert Copsey praised the high-energy nature of the show with vigorous dancing and "blistering" pace but felt that there was a lack of hits performed in the show's first half. NME editor Emily Mackay echoed his statements giving a mixed review for the tour, further criticizing the lack of hits in the set list and adding that only a "paucity of material" was incorporated in the set. She further dismissed the placement of interlude films in the show. A negative review came from San Jose Mercury News' Jim Harrington who called the tour "flawed", criticized its set list consisting of "plenty of filler[s]" and the many dissipating costume changes she went through for the show. He further noted that the singer looked and sounded well but blamed the way the show and the production were choreographed.

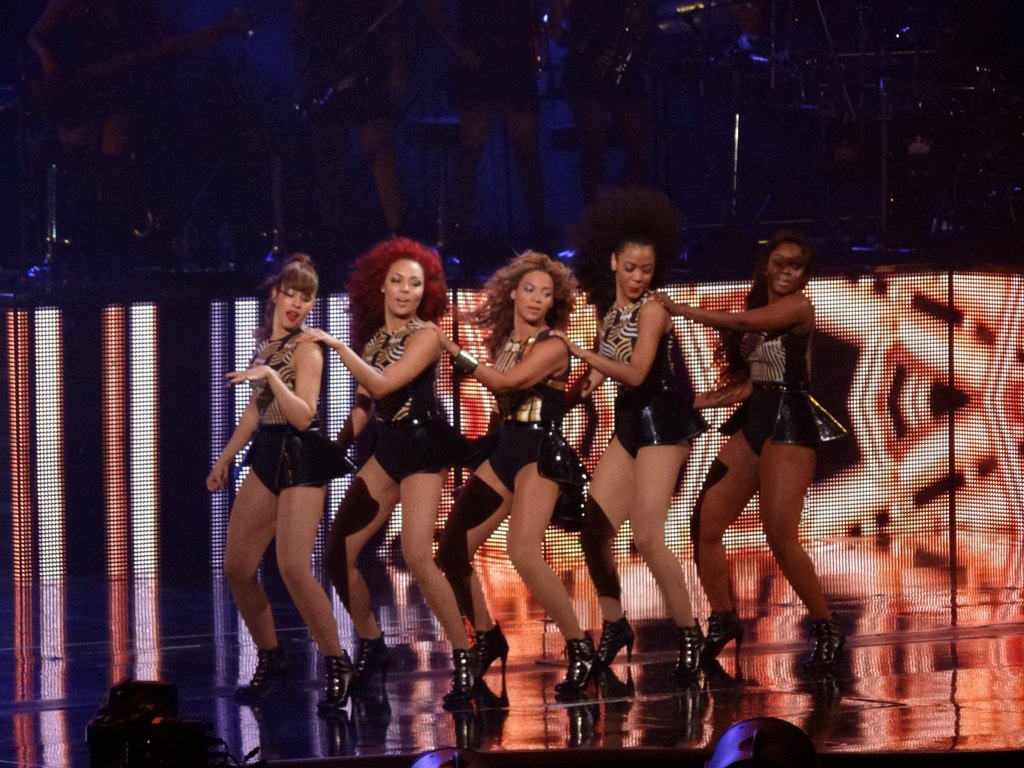
Beyoncé and her background dancers performing during "Crazy in Love"

The revamped show in 2014 received acclaim by critics. Isabel Mohan from The Daily Telegraph acclaimed the revamped show praising the singer's sex appeal and noted that although the set included many new songs, the singer "remained strikingly composed and confident throughout a show which proved her talent, charisma and awe-inspiring thighs". Sidney Madden who praised the upgraded set list further commended the show's fashion. Digital Spy's Robert Copsey felt that the show's set list was better than the original one, describing the tour as "wall-to-wall amazing Beyoncé". He concluded in his review, "The relentless pace, ever-changing visuals and sheer amount of songs crammed into the set is a lot to take in, let alone the fact that Beyoncé delivers the entire thing with power yet impeccable ease. When it comes to putting on a show of this calibre, these days she's really only competing with herself." The Observer's Kitty Empire praised the singer's raunchiness during the tour different from the other performers and concluded by writing, "There is no question as to Beyoncé's own powers. She can stop and start her all-female band... with a click of her fingers, and keep climbing octaves until you think her lungs are about to jump out of her chest. She sings (with a range that only gets wider and deeper with every tour) and dances (flawlessly) for more than one and a half hours." David Pollock of The Independent felt that, "this near two-hour epic is a ferocious distillation of musical styles old and new and a stunning declaration of intent that Knowles intends to be recognised as the defining pop artist of her era. It was, at the very least, one of the hardest working shows likely to be witnessed on a stage this year, and with barely a drop of minutely-choreographed sweat to be seen."

The tour received a nomination in the category for Choice Summer Tour at the 2013 Teen Choice Summer Tour losing to One Direction's Take Me Home Tour. It was also nominated for Concert Marketing & Promotion Award and Eventful Fans' Choice Award at the 2013 Billboard Music Awards. The tour is nominated in the category for Best Tour at the 2014 Billboard Mid-Year Music Awards.

== Commercial performance ==
Following the general on-sale of tickets, tour stops in several cities across America sold out in minutes after being announced. Due to the high demand, one extra show was added in Amsterdam, one extra show in Antwerp, two extra shows in London and a third date in Manchester. In North America, extra dates were added in Washington, D.C. Los Angeles and New York City. Phone firm O2, which was behind the pre-sale of the UK shows, said it could have sold out London's O_{2} Arena 150 times with the number of website hits with a spokesman noting the "unprecedented level of demand from O2 customers looking to buy tickets". Following the frenzied rush for tickets during the general sale, the UK tour had completely sold out within three minutes. Tickets for Rock in Rio became available for general sale on April 4, 2013, and within two hours, the first day of the festival, in which Beyoncé was headlining, had sold out all 65,000 tickets. 20,000 tickets had already sold out from the pre-sale a few months before. On July 7, 2013, Beyoncé's performance at the Essence Music Festival broke the attendance record with over 70,000 people in attendance. On June 24, 2013, a second wave of tour dates were announced via Beyoncé's official website. Included in this was a second US leg as well as a Latin American leg, containing multiple stadium dates in Brazil. It was revealed that Beyoncé set the record for the highest number of concert attendees in Brazil for the year 2013, with more than 230,000 fans attending her 5 shows in the country.

A second promotional poster for the tour was used to promote the 2014 shows in Europe.

On July 7, 2013, the Oceania leg of the tour was announced, with dates set for shows in Australia and New Zealand, where Beyoncé held a concert for the first time in her career. Fan club tickets for the October 18, 2013, show in Auckland, New Zealand sold out in 3 minutes. The general sale for the New Zealand shows became available to the public on July 19, 2013, and within 15 minutes all allocations of tickets were sold out for the three shows. A fourth and final Auckland show was then added. Promoter Live Nation confirmed The Mrs. Carter Show World Tour was officially the fastest selling tour of all time at Vector Arena. It also became the concert with the highest attendance at Vector Arena by a solo artist, with 44,596 tickets sold. Beyoncé's two shows at the Perth Arena went on to hold the number one and two spots for highest attendance in a single show, dethroning previous record holder Pink. It was then announced that Beyoncé's Australasian leg of the tour was one of the most successful tours in the continent from any artist, playing for more than 220,000 fans and earning 40 million Australian dollars.

On December 11, 2013, a second European leg through 2014 was announced bringing the total number of shows to 132, thus becoming Beyoncé's longest running tour to date. Similar to the first European leg, a frenzied rush for tickets, further enhanced by the release of the singer's self-titled fifth studio album three days before ticket sales began, resulted in extra dates being added for all United Kingdom shows, Dublin, Cologne, Amsterdam and Antwerp. For the second European leg, Beyoncé had beaten the record she herself had set earlier in the year, by selling 40,000 tickets in under one hour for the two 2014 concerts at Antwerp. Pollstar ranked The Mrs. Carter Show at number 2 on its year-end chart of the top twenty grossing worldwide tours with a gross of $188.6 million from the 2013 shows. Tickets were sold with an average gross of $2,449,248 per city. In April 2014, Billboard reported that Beyoncé's 2014 European shows grossed $41.1 million and played for an audience of 384,730. This brought The Mrs. Carter Show World Tour's total gross to $229.7 million when combined with the 107 shows performed in 2013, and the total attendance to 2,082,848, averaging 15,779 attendance and $1.74 million gross per night. The tour was Beyoncé's highest grossing to date before being surpassed by The Formation World Tour which grossed over $256 million.

== Broadcasts and recordings ==
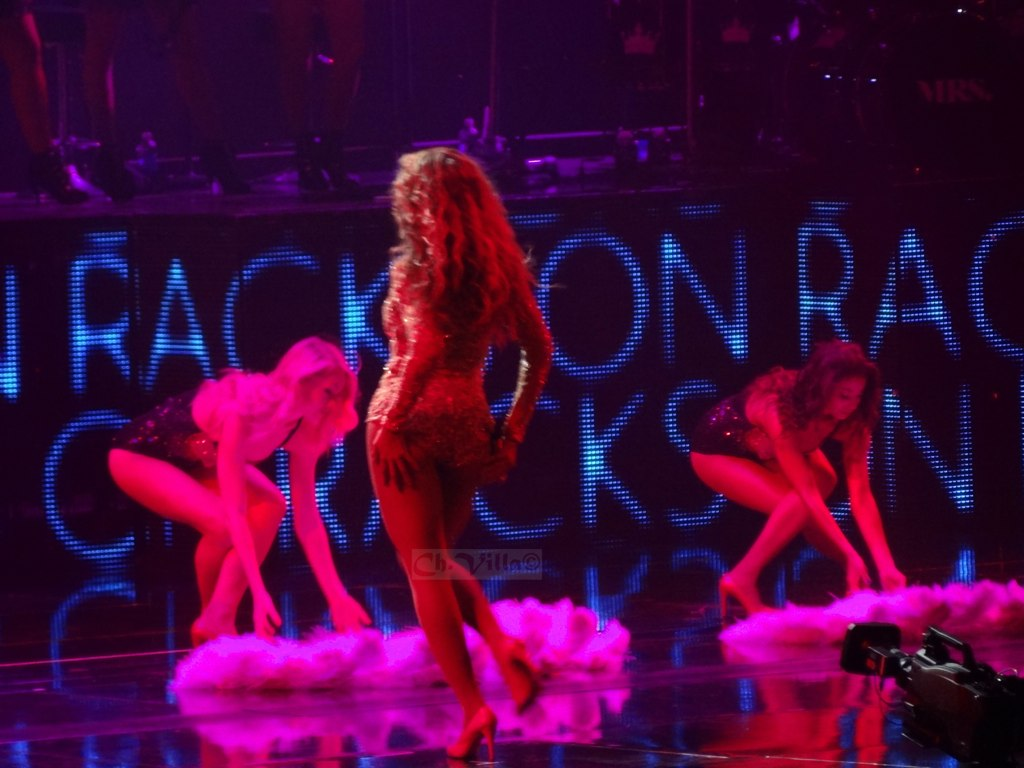
Beyoncé performing "Party", which featured a Las Vegas showgirl theme

Professional footage from the tour was officially released on April 22, 2013, through Beyoncé's YouTube channel and website. It showed the opening moments of the show and performances of "Run the World (Girls)", "Love on Top" and "Halo" during the first concerts. A series of eight behind-the-scenes footage of the rehearsals and preparations for the tour were released on Beyoncé's website on May 21, 2013. During "The Sound of Change Live" charity concert held at Twickenham Stadium in London on June 1, 2013, various clips and performances were broadcast worldwide to over 150 countries which were believed to have reached over 1 billion people.

A thirty-second trailer for the tour was released on June 24, 2013, containing live vocals of Beyoncé's "Get Me Bodied" and a dubstep audio mix. It showed footage from the tour's commercial and multiple snippets of live performances from the show. On August 29, 2013, Beyoncé posted a video titled "Bey Good" on her official website showing scenes of her with fans backstage and during the concerts. During Beyoncé's performance at the Made in America Festival, the two opening songs—"Run the World (Girls)" and "End of Time"—were streamed live via YouTube. Beyoncé's performance at Rock in Rio was broadcast in its entirety, and also streamed via YouTube. On August 22, 2013, Beyoncé released a black-and-white promotional retro video for the tour dates in Brazil. It was set to Frank Sinatra's version of the song "The Girl from Ipanema". The video featured the singer in a bikini swimming in the water, writing Brazil in the sand and relaxing on a hammock as well as various shots of the city.

In March 2014, a new promotional video was released midway through the second European leg and first leg of the 2014 tour. This was the first venture of the tour to include new performances and songs from Beyoncé's recently released self-titled fifth studio album. The video showed professional clips from some new performances and also featured a variety of backstage activity from the revamped tour. A video titled "Goodbye to The Mrs. Carter Show World Tour" was uploaded by the singer on her official YouTube channel on March 27, 2014, showing portions of live performances from the final leg of the tour, behind the scenes moments and visits to cities as "XO" was played in the background. In June 2014 it was announced that HBO would air Beyonce: X10, a 10-episode series of four-minute segments of concert performances debuting weekly before new episodes of True Blood starting June 29. The performances were captured in various cities during the tour. They are included on a bonus disc in the platinum edition release of Beyoncé's 2013 self-titled album, which was released on November 24, 2014.

== Set list ==
=== 2013 ===
1. "Run the World (Girls)"
2. "End of Time"
3. "Flaws and All"
4. "If I Were a Boy" / "Bitter Sweet Symphony"
5. "Get Me Bodied"
6. "Baby Boy"
7. "Diva"
8. "Naughty Girl"
9. "Party"
10. "Freakum Dress"
11. "I Care"
12. "I Miss You"
13. "Schoolin' Life"
14. "Why Don't You Love Me"
15. "1+1"
16. "Irreplaceable"
17. "Love On Top"
18. "Survivor"
19. "Crazy in Love"
20. "Single Ladies (Put a Ring on It)" / "Movin' on Up"

Encore

21. "Grown Woman"
22. "I Will Always Love You" / "Halo"

=== 2014 ===
1. "Run the World (Girls)"
2. "Bow Down" / "Flawless" / "Yoncé"
3. "Get Me Bodied"
4. "Baby Boy"
5. "Diva
6. "Naughty Girl"
7. "Blow"
8. "Partition"
9. "Haunted"
10. "Drunk in Love"
11. "1+1"
12. "Why Don't You Love Me"
13. "Irreplaceable"
14. "Love On Top"
15. "Crazy in Love"
16. "Single Ladies (Put a Ring on It)"
17. "I Will Always Love You" / "Heaven"
18. "XO"

Encore

19. "Halo"

=== Notes ===
- ”Dance For You” was removed from the setlist after the show on April 15, 2013.
- "Grown Woman" was performed for the first time in Paris on April 24, 2013, and was later permanently included to the set list for all future stops, until the second North American leg where the song was only performed in select cities.
- "Standing on the Sun" was performed live for the first and only time in Antwerp on May 31, 2013.
- On June 1, 2013, during The Sound of Change Live charity event at Twickenham Stadium, London, Beyoncé was accompanied by an 8-piece string ensemble. She was joined by husband Jay-Z on stage whilst performing "Crazy in Love". The show lasted for 45 minutes and contained unique, one-time only costumes designed by Gucci for the special event.
- "Bow Down" was performed for the first time during the concert in Beyoncé's hometown of Houston, Texas on July 15, 2013. During the beginning of the performance, images of Beyoncé's dancers as children with the words "Bow Down" flashed across the screen appeared as sound bites of gossip reports were heard in the background. Beyoncé addressed many rumors surrounding her throughout her career including faking her pregnancy with daughter Blue Ivy Carter, before appearing on stage and beginning the song along with a choreography.
- At the July 20, 2013, concert in Detroit, Beyoncé covered Sam Cooke's "A Change Is Gonna Come", following the city's file for bankruptcy. As Beyoncé performed, the screen behind her displayed photos of Detroit's landmarks and icons including Aretha Franklin, Aaliyah, Eminem, Anita Baker, Bob Seger, Kid Rock, The White Stripes, Berry Gordy, Jr and Joe Louis. The montage ended with the declaration "Nothing Stops Detroit!". A video of Beyoncé's cover of the song at the concert was released through her official YouTube channel on July 30, 2013.
- At the August 5, 2013, concert in New York City, Jay-Z appeared on stage unannounced after Beyoncé finished performing "Bow Down". Beyoncé took a seat on stage and Jay-Z performed his song "Tom Ford" (2013). During the end of the performance Beyoncé stood up and provided backing vocals for the song.
- At Beyoncé's shows in Colombia, México, Puerto Rico and Venezuela, much to the fans' enjoyment, she sang the first verse and chorus of "Irremplazable", the Spanish version of "Irreplaceable", before finishing the song in English as she walked close to the front rows of the audience.
- At the end of Beyoncé's performance at the 2013 Rock in Rio festival, after "Halo", Beyoncé and co. performed Brazilian funk choreography to the song "Passinho do Volante (Ah Lelek Lek Lek)".
- By the time the Australian tour began, on October 22, 2013, "Flaws and All", "I Care", "I Miss You" and "Schoolin' Life" were all cut from the set list.
- Beyoncé performed "XO" for the first time during her December 13, 2013, concert in Chicago, the day she unexpectedly released her fifth studio album, Beyoncé.
- On the opening night of the 2014 tour in Glasgow, "Haunted" was used as the opening song, "Drunk in Love" as the second, "If I Were a Boy" as the third, and "Run the World (Girls)" and "I Will Always Love You" was not performed.
- Jay-Z appeared on stage to perform "Drunk in Love" with Beyoncé at all six 2014 shows in London.
- Jay-Z appeared on stage to perform "Drunk in Love" with Beyoncé on the last show of the tour, in Lisbon.
- "Resentment" was performed on select dates in the 1st European leg.

== Shows ==
List of 2013 concerts, showing date, city, country, venue, opening acts, attendance and revenue.
Date (2013)	City	Country	Venue	Opening acts	Attendance	Revenue
April 15	Belgrade	Serbia	Kombank Arena	—N/a	16,719 / 16,719	$834,621
April 17	Zagreb	Croatia	Arena Zagreb	Franka Batelić	16,920 / 16,920	$932,089
April 19	Bratislava	Slovakia	Ondrej Nepela Arena	—N/a	8,770 / 8,770	$1,163,637
April 21	Amsterdam	Netherlands	Ziggo Dome	Eva Simons	30,897 / 31,600	$2,559,806
April 22	Amsterdam	Netherlands	Ziggo Dome	Eva Simons	30,897 / 31,600	$2,559,806
April 24	Paris	France	Palais omnisports de Paris-Bercy	Luke James	30,866 / 30,866	$2,338,754
April 25	Paris	France	Palais omnisports de Paris-Bercy	Luke James	30,866 / 30,866	$2,338,754
April 26	Birmingham	England	LG Arena	Luke James	29,046 / 29,450	$2,952,937
April 27	Birmingham	England	LG Arena	Luke James	29,046 / 29,450	$2,952,937
April 29	London	England	The O_{2} Arena	Luke James	97,082 / 98,212	$9,985,780
April 30	London	England	The O_{2} Arena	Luke James	97,082 / 98,212	$9,985,780
May 1	London	England	The O_{2} Arena	Luke James	97,082 / 98,212	$9,985,780
May 3	London	England	The O_{2} Arena	Luke James	97,082 / 98,212	$9,985,780
May 4	London	England	The O_{2} Arena	Luke James	97,082 / 98,212	$9,985,780
May 5	London	England	The O_{2} Arena	Luke James	97,082 / 98,212	$9,985,780
May 7	Manchester	England	Manchester Arena	Luke James	44,739 / 45,064	$4,650,150
May 8	Manchester	England	Manchester Arena	Luke James	44,739 / 45,064	$4,650,150
May 9	Manchester	England	Manchester Arena	Luke James	44,739 / 45,064	$4,650,150
May 11	Dublin	Ireland	The O_{2}	Luke James	25,536 / 25,536	$2,752,927
May 12	Dublin	Ireland	The O_{2}	Luke James	25,536 / 25,536	$2,752,927
May 15	Antwerp	Belgium	Sportpaleis	Luke James	34,785 / 34,793 (Note: This box office score data is representative of both shows at the Sportpaleis on May 15 and 31 respectively.)	$2,927,440
May 17	Zürich	Switzerland	Hallenstadion	Luke James	13,000 / 13,000	$1,154,980
May 18	Assago (Note: Promoted as Milan)	Italy	Mediolanum Forum	Luke James	9,964 / 9,964	$882,241
May 20	Montpellier	France	Park&Suites Arena	Luke James	11,993 / 11,993	$1,212,031
May 22	Munich	Germany	Olympiahalle	Luke James	11,857 / 11,857	$981,667
May 23	Berlin	Germany	O_{2} World	Luke James	27,632 / 27,632	$2,015,780
May 24	Berlin	Germany	O_{2} World	Luke James	27,632 / 27,632	$2,015,780
May 25 (Note: The May 25, 2013, concert in Warsaw was a part of the Orange Warsaw Festival.)	Warsaw	Poland	Warsaw National Stadium	Luke James	49,034 / 49,034	$3,651,304
May 27	Copenhagen	Denmark	Forum Copenhagen	Luke James	9,890 / 9,890	$1,052,082
May 28	Fornebu (Note: Promoted as Oslo)	Norway	Telenor Arena	LidoLido	21,989 / 21,989	$2,204,442
May 29	Stockholm	Sweden	Ericsson Globe	Luke James	13,934 / 13,934	$1,318,690
May 31 (Note: The May 31, 2013, concert in Antwerp, Belgium at the Sportpaleis was originally planned to take place on May 14 but was rescheduled to May 31 due to dehydration and exhaustion.)	Antwerp	Belgium	Sportpaleis	Luke James		
June 1	Twickenham	England	Twickenham Stadium	—N/a	45,060 / 45,060	$5,132,599
June 28 (Note: The June 28, 2013, concert was a part of BET Experience 2013.)	Los Angeles	United States	Staples Center	Melanie Fiona	14,045 / 14,045	$1,573,932
June 29	Paradise (Note: Promoted as Las Vegas)	United States	MGM Grand Garden Arena	Luke James	12,913 / 12,913	$1,856,203
July 1	Los Angeles	United States	Staples Center	Luke James	13,715 / 13,715	$1,798,782
July 2	San Jose	United States	SAP Center	Luke James	12,304 / 12,304	$1,414,075
July 5	Oklahoma City	United States	Chesapeake Energy Arena	Luke James	11,746 / 11,746	$1,277,715
July 6	Dallas	United States	American Airlines Center	Luke James	13,758 / 13,758	$1,427,075
July 7 (Note: The July 7, 2013, concert in New Orleans was a part of the Essence Music Festival.)	New Orleans	United States	Mercedes-Benz Superdome	—N/a	38,441 / 38,441	$5,766,150
July 9	Sunrise	United States	BB&T Center	Luke James	12,269 / 12,269	$1,328,330
July 10	Miami	United States	American Airlines Arena	Luke James	13,323 / 13,323	$1,444,290
July 12	Duluth (Note: Promoted as Atlanta)	United States	The Arena at Gwinnett Center	Luke James	10,662 / 10,662	$1,089,710
July 13	Nashville	United States	Bridgestone Arena	Luke James	14,233 / 14,233	$1,399,640
July 15	Houston	United States	Toyota Center	Luke James	11,935 / 11,935	$1,320,925
July 17	Chicago	United States	United Center	Luke James	14,154 / 14,154	$1,688,865
July 18	Saint Paul	United States	Xcel Energy Center	Luke James	14,187 / 14,187	$1,349,130
July 20	Auburn Hills	United States	The Palace of Auburn Hills	Luke James	13,901 / 13,901	$1,414,609
July 21	Toronto	Canada	Air Canada Centre	Luke James	14,610 / 14,610	$1,690,500
July 22	Montreal	Canada	Bell Centre	Luke James	14,609 / 14,609	$1,570,565
July 23	Boston	United States	TD Garden	Luke James	12,911 / 12,911	$1,574,130
July 25	Philadelphia	United States	Wells Fargo Center	Luke James	14,671 / 14,671	$1,491,320
July 26	Atlantic City	United States	Boardwalk Hall	Luke James	12,788 / 12,788	$1,646,832
July 27	Charlotte	United States	Time Warner Cable Arena	Luke James	14,355 / 14,355	$1,393,108
July 29	Washington, D.C.	United States	Verizon Center	Luke James	27,133 / 27,133	$3,110,937
July 30	Washington, D.C.	United States	Verizon Center	Luke James	27,133 / 27,133	$3,110,937
July 31	East Rutherford	United States	Izod Center	Luke James	14,264 / 14,264	$1,598,000
August 2	Uncasville	United States	Mohegan Sun Arena	Luke James	7,473 / 7,473	$702,825
August 3	New York City	United States	Barclays Center	Luke James	41,907 / 41,907	$5,357,970
August 4	New York City	United States	Barclays Center	Luke James	41,907 / 41,907	$5,357,970
August 5	New York City	United States	Barclays Center	Luke James	41,907 / 41,907	$5,357,970
August 17 (Note: The August 17–18, 2013 concerts in Chelmsford and Weston-under-Lizard were a part of the 2013 V Festival.)	Chelmsford	England	Hylands Park	—N/a	—N/a	—N/a
August 18	Weston-under-Lizard	England	Weston Park	—N/a	—N/a	—N/a
August 31 (Note: The August 31, 2013, concert in Philadelphia was a part of the Made in America Music Festival.)	Philadelphia	United States	Benjamin Franklin Parkway	—N/a	—N/a	—N/a
September 8	Fortaleza	Brazil	Arena Castelão	—N/a	27,847 / 40,000	$2,563,750
September 11	Belo Horizonte	Brazil	Mineirão Stadium	—N/a	22,023 / 40,000	$1,986,730
September 13 (Note: The September 13, 2013, concert in Rio de Janeiro was a part of Rock in Rio festival.)	Rio de Janeiro	Brazil	Parque dos Atletas	—N/a	85,000 / 85,000	—N/a
September 15	São Paulo	Brazil	Estádio do Morumbi	—N/a	37,346 / 50,000	$3,415,660
September 17	Brasília	Brazil	Estádio Nacional Mané Garrincha	—N/a	36,284 / 40,000	$2,444,810
September 20	Caracas	Venezuela	Estadio de Fútbol de la USB	DJ Kika	9,406 / 12,000	$4,737,070
September 22 (Note: The September 22, 2013, concert in Medellín was held to celebrate the 10th anniversary of W Radio.)	Medellín	Colombia	Estadio Atanasio Girardot	—N/a	42,000 / 42,000	$822,500
September 24	Monterrey	Mexico	Monterrey Arena	—N/a	11,810 / 11,810	$986,466
September 26	Mexico City	Mexico	Palacio de los Deportes	—N/a	19,027 / 19,107	$1,858,905
September 28	San Juan	Puerto Rico	José Miguel Agrelot Coliseum	Calma Carmona	14,358 / 14,358	$1,801,378
October 16	Auckland	New Zealand	Vector Arena	Stan Walker	44,760 / 47,200	$6,748,371
October 17	Auckland	New Zealand	Vector Arena	Stan Walker	44,760 / 47,200	$6,748,371
October 18	Auckland	New Zealand	Vector Arena	Stan Walker	44,760 / 47,200	$6,748,371
October 19	Auckland	New Zealand	Vector Arena	Stan Walker	44,760 / 47,200	$6,748,371
October 22	Melbourne	Australia	Rod Laver Arena	Iggy Azalea	47,320 / 47,320	$7,890,660
October 23	Melbourne	Australia	Rod Laver Arena	Iggy Azalea	47,320 / 47,320	$7,890,660
October 25	Melbourne	Australia	Rod Laver Arena	Iggy Azalea	47,320 / 47,320	$7,890,660
October 26	Melbourne	Australia	Rod Laver Arena	Iggy Azalea	47,320 / 47,320	$7,890,660
October 28	Brisbane	Australia	Brisbane Entertainment Centre	Iggy Azalea	22,214 / 22,536	$3,815,980
October 29	Brisbane	Australia	Brisbane Entertainment Centre	Iggy Azalea	22,214 / 22,536	$3,815,980
October 31	Sydney	Australia	Allphones Arena	Stan Walker	56,822 / 56,822	$9,422,280
November 1	Sydney	Australia	Allphones Arena	Stan Walker	56,822 / 56,822	$9,422,280
November 2	Sydney	Australia	Allphones Arena	Stan Walker	56,822 / 56,822	$9,422,280
November 3	Sydney	Australia	Allphones Arena	Iggy Azalea	56,822 / 56,822	$9,422,280
November 5	Adelaide	Australia	Adelaide Entertainment Centre	Iggy Azalea	15,330 / 15,330	$2,697,390
November 6	Adelaide	Australia	Adelaide Entertainment Centre	Iggy Azalea	15,330 / 15,330	$2,697,390
November 8	Perth	Australia	Perth Arena	Stan Walker	29,356 / 29,356	$4,994,010
November 9	Perth	Australia	Perth Arena	Stan Walker	29,356 / 29,356	$4,994,010
November 30	Vancouver	Canada	Rogers Arena	Luke James	13,590 / 13,590	$1,721,804
December 2	San Jose	United States	SAP Center	Luke James	11,972 / 12,618	$1,490,045
December 3	Los Angeles	United States	Staples Center	Luke James	13,982 / 13,982	$1,954,343
December 6	Las Vegas	United States	MGM Grand Garden Arena	Luke James	12,811 / 12,811	$1,872,823
December 7	Phoenix	United States	Talking Stick Resort Arena	Luke James	10,752 / 10,752	$1,299,545
December 9	Dallas	United States	American Airlines Center	Luke James	12,011 / 12,011	$1,336,055
December 10	Houston	United States	Toyota Center	Luke James	11,936 / 11,936	$1,414,525
December 12	Louisville	United States	KFC Yum! Center	Luke James	14,979 / 14,979	$1,746,575
December 13	Chicago	United States	United Center	Luke James	14,005 / 14,005	$1,859,745
December 14	St. Louis	United States	Scottrade Center	Luke James	14,079 / 14,079	$1,588,140
December 16	Toronto	Canada	Air Canada Centre	Luke James	14,785 / 14,785	$1,906,954
December 18	Washington, D.C.	United States	Verizon Center	Luke James	14,074 / 14,074	$1,605,612
December 19	New York City	United States	Barclays Center	Luke James	27,760 / 27,760	$3,695,080
December 20	Boston	United States	TD Garden	Luke James	13,003 / 13,003	$1,686,370
December 22	New York City	United States	Barclays Center	Luke James	(Note: The box office score data is representative of both shows at the Barclays Center on December 19 and 22 respectively.)	

List of 2014 concerts, showing date, city, country, venue, opening acts, attendance and revenue.
Date (2014)	City	Country	Venue	Opening acts	Attendance	Revenue
February 20	Glasgow	Scotland	SSE Hydro	Monsieur Adi	23,850 / 23,850	$2,898,560
February 21	Glasgow	Scotland	SSE Hydro	Monsieur Adi	23,850 / 23,850	$2,898,560
February 23	Birmingham	England	LG Arena	Monsieur Adi	29,006 / 29,006	$3,400,510
February 24	Birmingham	England	LG Arena	Sam Bailey	29,006 / 29,006	$3,400,510
February 25	Manchester	England	Phones 4u Arena	Monsieur Adi	30,119 / 30,119	$3,553,940
February 26	Manchester	England	Phones 4u Arena	Monsieur Adi	30,119 / 30,119	$3,553,940
February 28	London	England	The O_{2} Arena	Monsieur Adi	99,183 / 99,183	$11,385,400
March 1	London	England	The O_{2} Arena	Monsieur Adi	99,183 / 99,183	$11,385,400
March 2	London	England	The O_{2} Arena	Monsieur Adi	99,183 / 99,183	$11,385,400
March 4	London	England	The O_{2} Arena	Monsieur Adi	99,183 / 99,183	$11,385,400
March 5	London	England	The O_{2} Arena	Monsieur Adi	99,183 / 99,183	$11,385,400
March 6	London	England	The O_{2} Arena	Monsieur Adi	99,183 / 99,183	$11,385,400
March 8	Dublin	Ireland	The O_{2}	Monsieur Adi	51,100 / 51,100	$5,554,170
March 9	Dublin	Ireland	The O_{2}	Monsieur Adi	51,100 / 51,100	$5,554,170
March 11	Dublin	Ireland	The O_{2}	Monsieur Adi	51,100 / 51,100	$5,554,170
March 12	Dublin	Ireland	The O_{2}	Monsieur Adi	51,100 / 51,100	$5,554,170
March 15	Cologne	Germany	Lanxess Arena	Monsieur Adi	29,781 / 29,781	$2,875,770
March 16	Cologne	Germany	Lanxess Arena	Monsieur Adi	29,781 / 29,781	$2,875,770
March 18	Amsterdam	Netherlands	Ziggo Dome	Monsieur Adi	31,353 / 31,353	$2,912,550
March 19	Amsterdam	Netherlands	Ziggo Dome	Monsieur Adi	31,353 / 31,353	$2,912,550
March 20	Antwerp	Belgium	Sportpaleis	Monsieur Adi	36,972 / 36,972	$3,489,100
March 21	Antwerp	Belgium	Sportpaleis	Monsieur Adi	36,972 / 36,972	$3,489,100
March 24	Barcelona	Spain	Palau Sant Jordi	Monsieur Adi	17,315 / 17,315	$1,993,000
March 26	Lisbon	Portugal	MEO Arena	Monsieur Adi	36,051 / 36,051	$3,064,960
March 27	Lisbon	Portugal	MEO Arena	Monsieur Adi	36,051 / 36,051	$3,064,960
Total					2,049,692 / 2,104,844 (97%)	$221,989,791

== Personnel ==
Credits and personnel are taken from the Official The Mrs. Carter Show World Tour Program.

Creative direction

- Beyoncé – show direction, staging, choreography
- Frank Gatson – show direction, staging, choreographer, creative director
- Tina Knowles – creative consultant, stylist
- Ty Hunter – stylist

Tour management

- Alan Floyd – tour manager
- Justin Hylton-Williams – tour manager
- Marlon Bowers – assistant tour manager
- Larry Beyince – tour assistant
- Daniel Kernan – tour accountant
- Josh Katzman – tour accountant

Suga Mama Band

- Derek Dixie– music director
- Cora Coleman-Dunham – band leader, drummer (2013)
- Rie Tsuji – musical director, keyboards
- Bibi McGill – guitar
- Katty Rodriguez-Harrold – tenor saxophone
- Crystal J. Torres – trumpet
- Lauren Taneil – bass
- Adison Evans – alto saxophone
- Dani Ivory – additional keyboard
- Venzella Joy – drummer (2014)

The Mamas (background vocalists)

- Montina Cooper
- Crystal A. Collins
- Tiffany Moníque Riddick

Dancers

- Ashley Everett – female dance captain
- Kimberly "Kimmie" Gipson – female dance captain
- Amandy Fernandez
- Hannah Douglass
- Tanesha "KSYN" Cason
- Kim Gingras
- Denee (Dnay) Baptiste
- Sarah Burns (left after the 2013 leg)
- Hajiba Fahmy (left after the 2013 leg)
- Les Twins

Choreographers

- JaQuel Knight
- Chris Grant

Assistant choreographers

- Christian Owens
- Sean Bankhead
- Les Twins
- Dana Foglia
- Mishai Peyronelli
- Bianca Li
- Darrell Grand Moulfree
- Amy Hall Garner
- Sheryl Murakami
- Michelle Robinson
- Anthony Burrell
- Denee (Dnay) Baptise
- James Alsop
- Jefferey Page

Security

- Julius DeBoer – head security for Beyoncé
- Kelly Samlelen – security for Beyoncé
- Bob Fontenot – venue security

Tour book

- Milan Zrnic – creative director
- David Roemer – photographer

== See also ==
- List of highest-grossing concert tours by women
