= Life Is But a Dream (film) =

2013 documentary directed by Beyoncé

- Promotional poster
- Genre: Documentary film
- Directed by: Ed Burke; Beyoncé Knowles
- Starring: Beyoncé Knowles
- Narrated by: Beyoncé Knowles
- Theme music composer: Ben Salisbury; Robert Schaper (music editor)
- Country of origin: United States
- Original language: English

Production
- Producers: Bill Kirstein; Lee Anne Callahan-Longo
- Cinematography: Ed Burke
- Editor: Ilan Benatar
- Running time: 90 minutes

Original release
- Network: HBO
- Release: February 16, 2013

Life Is But a Dream is a 2013 autobiographical television film, co-directed and executive produced by American singer Beyoncé Knowles in her directorial debut. The film was released on February 16, 2013 on the HBO network, in conjunction with Parkwood Entertainment, Knowles' management company. The film uses a combination of professional camera footage, private videos from Knowles' laptop and from her May 2012 four-night revue at Revel Atlantic City. Upon its release, the documentary opened to mixed reviews from critics. It was nominated in the NAACP Image Award for Outstanding Documentary category for the 45th Annual NAACP Image Awards.

== Cast ==
- Beyoncé
- Jay-Z
- Blue Ivy Carter
- Tina Knowles
- Mathew Knowles
- Kelly Rowland
- Solange Knowles
- Michelle Williams
- Daniel Julez Smith, Jr.
- Letoya Luckett
- LaTavia Roberson

== Background and release ==
I wouldn't have released a film just for the sake of self documentation. I wanted it to express what I believe to be true about life – that it's not random, that everything has a reason and that we need to be conscious of life's little clues and how the dots all connect or we miss out.

— Beyoncé Knowles, press release

The project was the culmination of an entire career's worth of archive footage and photographs kept in a digital storage room in Knowles' offices. Since 2005 Knowles hired a "visual director" to film her life, and also used a video camera on her personal computer.

Knowles is known for insisting on privacy, and the media hailed the film as a rare glimpse into her private life. This included documenting the events of her marriage to Jay-Z, her miscarriage, birth of daughter Blue Ivy, as well as her professional split from her father and manager Mathew Knowles. Knowles addressed this in an interview with GQ magazine, saying "I always battle with: How much do I reveal about myself? How do I keep my humility? How do I keep my spirit and the reality? And how do I continue to be generous to — to my fans and to my craft? And how do I stay current? But how do I stay soulful? And it is the battle of my life. When I walk into a stage I'm able to come out of my shell and be as fabulous and over the top and strong and powerful as I want to be."

In the UK, Life Is But a Dream premiered on BBC One on March 28, 2013 at 10:35pm. The film was released in Australia through Village Cinemas on May 8, 2013. In Belgium Life is But a Dream premiered on the TV station Eén as Het verhaal van ... Beyoncé on May 9, 2013 at 10:30pm.

== Promotion ==
The film premiered at the Ziegfeld Theatre in New York City on February 12, 2013. Knowles (wearing an Elie Saab gown) was in attendance as was her husband Jay-Z, her mother Tina Knowles, her sister Solange Knowles, Oprah Winfrey, Russell Simmons and Doutzen Kroes. Knowles appeared on Winfrey's Oprah's Next Chapter, principally to discuss the content and making of the film, as well as her recent Super Bowl halftime show.

== Reception ==
=== Critical reception ===
Review aggregation website Metacritic, which assigns a weighted mean rating out of 100 to reviews from mainstream critics, gave the film an average score of 56 based on 14 reviews, which indicates "mixed or average" reviews. Oprah Winfrey, who attended the premiere and interviewed Knowles before its screening called it "fiercely empowering," and said "she shocked me, I was in tears. ... She did an amazing job ... I think this documentary is a game changer." Billboard also praised it, saying, "Life is But a Dream is a pleasant surprise of a watch ... The well-oiled, media-trained, hit-making machine has a heart. And it's huge." Ken Tucker of Entertainment Weekly gave a positive review saying, "What gives this film grit are the visual displays of her work ethic and her fierce determination to 'bring R&B music back' to the center of current pop music, to 'forget being cool' and reveal naked passion." Adam Markovitz of the same publication described the documentary as a "delicate mix of the calculated and confessional, designed to let us just far enough into Knowles' world to keep us interested in her next tour, album, soda allegiance, etc." Carrie Battan from Pitchfork wrote that "there's no unturned insight, no secret to be discovered in this documentary besides the fact that she's simply everything we want her to be." Tom Gliatto of People magazine described the documentary as "gauzy" and "pretty".

Gerrick D. Kennedy from the Los Angeles Times wrote that the documentary "remains a victory for her fans. Casual viewers will most likely glean the same sense of the superstar's life as one might from a magazine feature. But for serious fans of the fiercely private superstar, this remains a window into her life." The Hollywood Reporter's David Rooney said, "this is less a documentary portrait than a micromanaged video diary exploring the R&B superstar's relationship with her laptop. The HBO film will be candy to her fan base; just don't expect startling insights into the woman behind the talent." Tirdad Derakhshani of the Philadelphia Media Network wrote that Life Is But a Dream "is a carefully filtered snapshot of an artist who has enough power to become maker of her own myth." Writing for Zap2it, Geoff Berkshire called it a "vanity project and calculated act of image control. The only thing revealed by the film -- co-directed, co-written and co-executive produced by Beyoncé herself -- is a narcissistic inability to give up that desire for control." Television critic Alessandra Stanley from The New York Times gave a negative review for the film, writing, "[Life is But a Dream] is as contrived as Madonna: Truth or Dare, but probably for good reason it is neither daring nor entirely truthful. It's an infomercial, not just about Beyoncé's talent onstage but her authenticity behind the scenes. She is a people-pleasing diva and she wants to keep it that way."

=== Ratings ===
The documentary garnered 2.3 million viewers for the initial broadcast. It was the largest audience for an HBO documentary since Nielsen revised its method of measuring viewership in 2004. The episode of Oprah's Next Chapter in which Knowles appeared to discuss the film was watched by 1.3 million viewers.

== Home media ==
Life Is But a Dream was released on DVD and Blu-ray on November 25, 2013 in a 2-disc set with bonus concert footage filmed at Revel Atlantic City in 2012 titled Live in Atlantic City. It also featured the new song "God Made You Beautiful". The DVD became Beyoncé's first British chart-topper in her career on the UK Music DVD Chart and her fourth number-one video on the Billboard Top Music Videos chart. It was also successful in different countries across Europe, entering the top ten on several charts.

== Certifications ==
Region	Certification	Certified units/sales
Australia (ARIA)	Gold	7,500^{^}
^{^} Shipments figures based on certification alone.
