= Super Bowl XLVII halftime show =

2013 show headlined by Beyoncé

- Part of: Super Bowl XLVII
- Date: February 3, 2013
- Location: New Orleans, Louisiana, United States
- Venue: Mercedes-Benz Superdome
- Headliner: Beyoncé
- Special guests: Destiny's Child (Kelly Rowland and Michelle Williams)
- Sponsor: Pepsi
- Director: Hamish Hamilton
- Producer: Ricky Kirshner

Super Bowl halftime show chronology
XLVI (2012)	XLVII (2013)	XLVIII (2014)

The Super Bowl XLVII halftime show occurred on February 3, 2013, at the Mercedes-Benz Superdome in New Orleans as part of Super Bowl XLVII. Beyoncé headlined with special guests Kelly Rowland and Michelle Williams from Destiny's Child. Telecast live in the U.S. by CBS, it was critically acclaimed, becoming the then third most watched show in Super Bowl history with 110.8 million viewers, behind the Super Bowl XXVII halftime show, and the previous year's Super Bowl XLVI halftime show.

The show was produced by Ricky Kirshner, directed by Hamish Hamilton, and choreographed by Frank Gatson Jr. It received widespread acclaim, with critics commenting that Beyoncé once more proved her abilities during live performances. The performance, and the stadium blackout that followed, generated more than 299,000 tweets per minute, making it the most-tweeted moment in the history of Twitter. It was the first Pepsi sponsored halftime show since Prince's performance in Super Bowl XLI.

== Background ==
In October 2012, news sources confirmed Beyoncé would headline the halftime show at the Super Bowl XLVII. Prior to the NFL's confirmation, Beyoncé made the announcement on her website confirmation by posting an image of her face with the date of the game stenciled into eye black. Lisa de Moraes of The Washington Post quipped that she would become the first "female solo artist under the age of AARP eligibility" to headline the Super Bowl halftime show. Initial reports mentioned that Beyoncé's husband, Jay-Z was a potential collaborator on the show. However, he did not appear during the show, and a source told to Us Weekly that he changed his decision at the last minute as he wanted the performance "to be her moment and didn't want to take away from it".

== Development ==
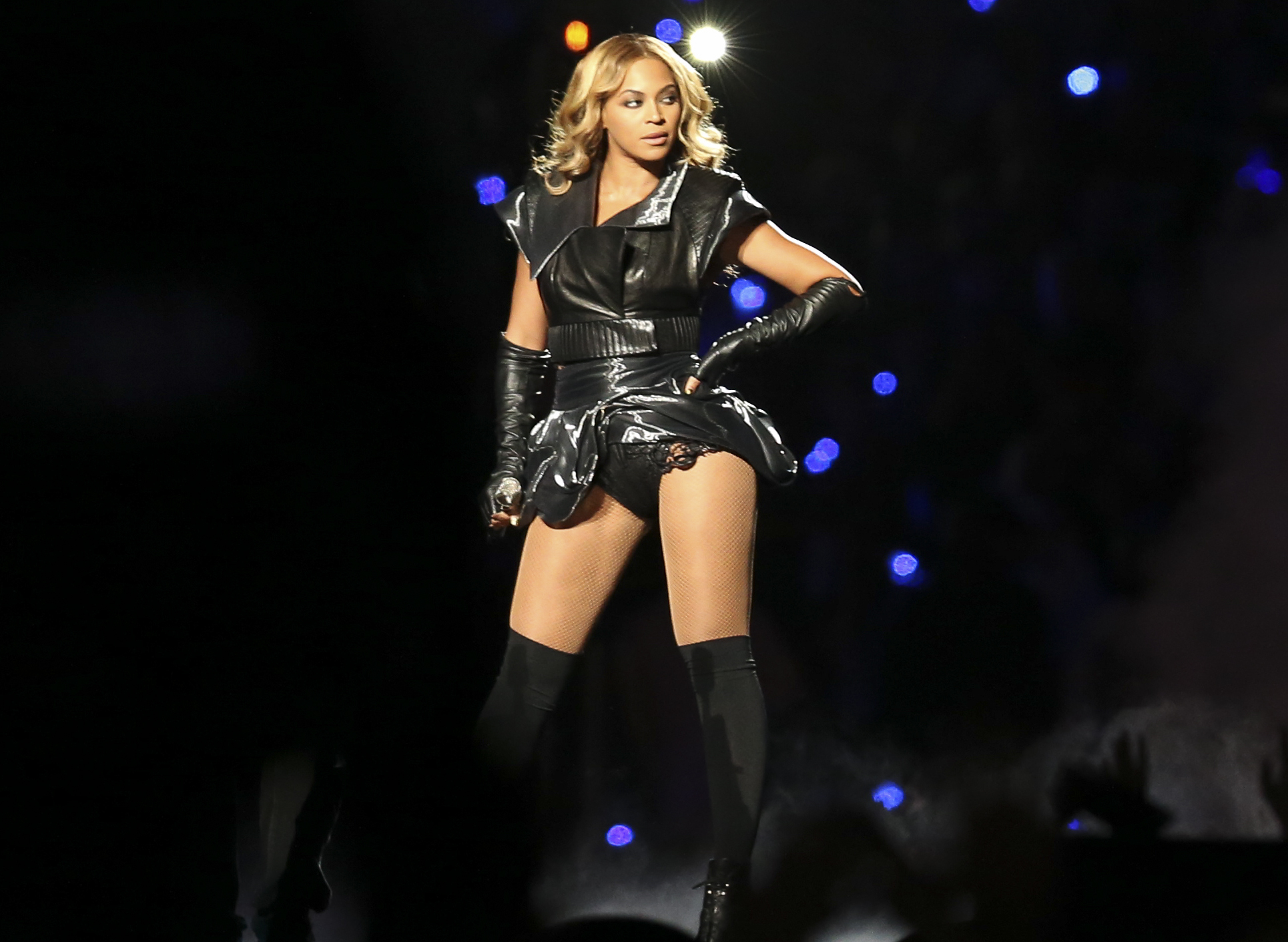
Beyoncé wearing an oversized black jacket over a lace-and-leather bodysuit, and thigh-high stockings for the halftime show.

The halftime show was produced by Ricky Kirshner and directed by Hamish Hamilton. During the performance Beyoncé was dressed in an oversized black jacket, lace-and-leather bodysuit and thigh-high stockings. Kelly Rowland and Michelle Williams were also dressed in a matching "black-leather dominatrix-wear", as stated by David Rooney of The Hollywood Reporter. Two logos of Beyoncé's portraits opposite each other were put on stage and the show began with Beyoncé emerging from the floor between them while a blaze of flames also appeared on stage. Throughout the performance, she was backed by her all-female band, her back-up dancers as well as the Saintsations, a 32-girl cheerleader troupe of host-city New Orleans team the Saints and a horn section made up of female musicians.

Following Beyoncé's performance of the American national anthem "The Star-Spangled Banner" at President Obama's second inauguration on January 21, 2013, she was accused for lip sync. During a news conference where she discussed her halftime performance, she admitted that she sang the song along with a pre-recorded track during the ceremony, but confirmed that she's going to sing live during the Super Bowl halftime show, saying "I will absolutely be singing live... This is what I was born to do, what I was born for. I've had a 16-year career. All the things I've done have prepared me for this." Following her performance at the halftime show, Jon Caramanica of The New York Times wrote that Beyoncé, who wasn't "used to having her reputation impugned", silenced the "doubters" who criticized her after the performance at the inauguration. Randall Roberts of the Los Angeles Times also wrote in his review: "As she danced and asked that the crowd clap along, her microphone hand made an audible thump. It was loud and obvious. And it proved something true: The mike was live, and our singer was too."

== Synopsis ==
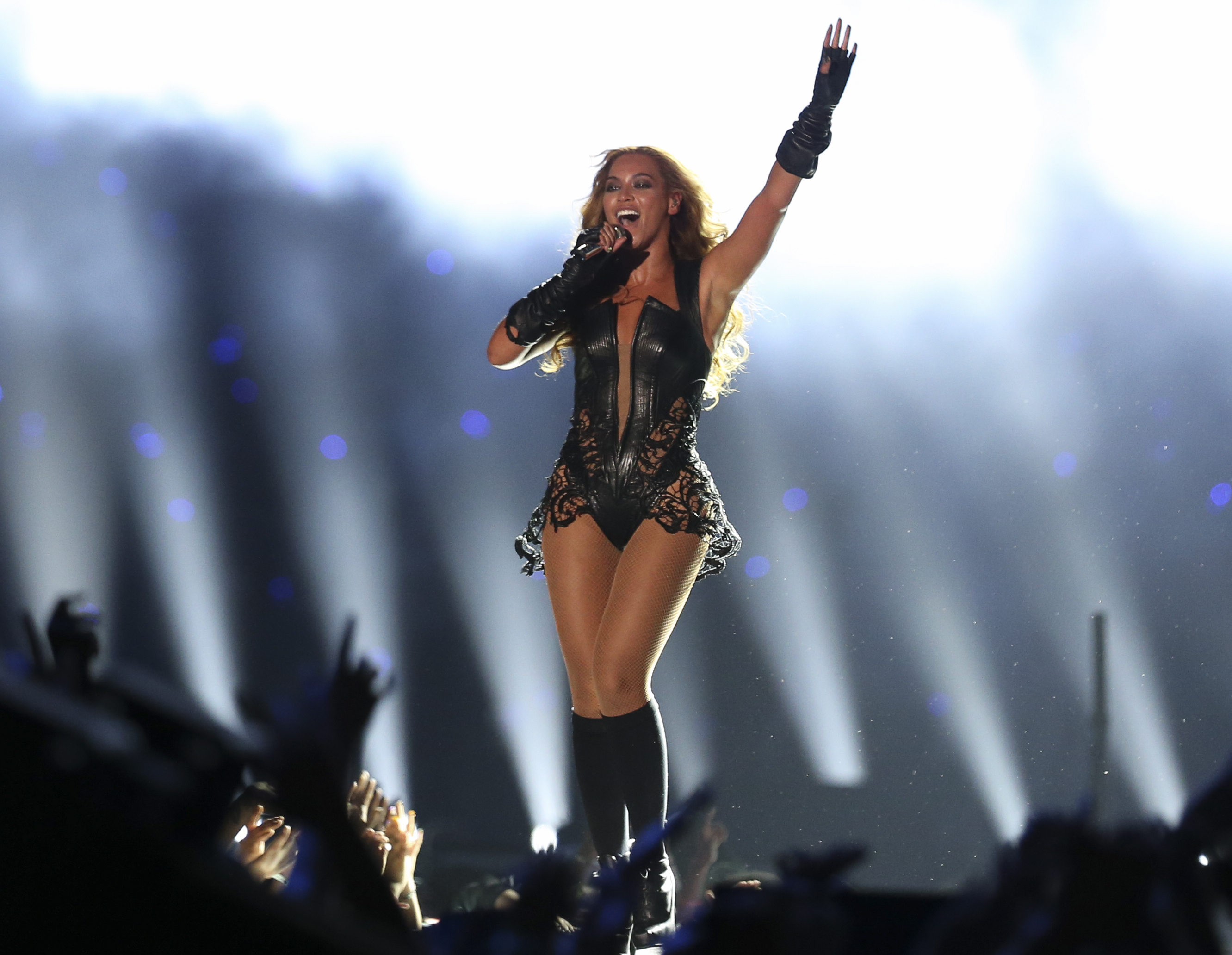
Beyoncé performing during the halftime show.

A countdown to the halftime show began under the music for "Countdown". It then opened with an instrumental portion of "Run the World (Girls)" and Beyoncé ascended on a stage lift while a Vince Lombardi speech was heard in the background:

"Excellence must be pursued, it must be wooed with all of one's might and every bit of effort that we have; each day there's a new encounter, each week is a new challenge. All of the noise and all of the glamour, all of the color all of the excitement, all of the rings and all of the money. These are the things that linger only in the memory. But the spirit, the will to excel, the will to win, these are the things that endure."

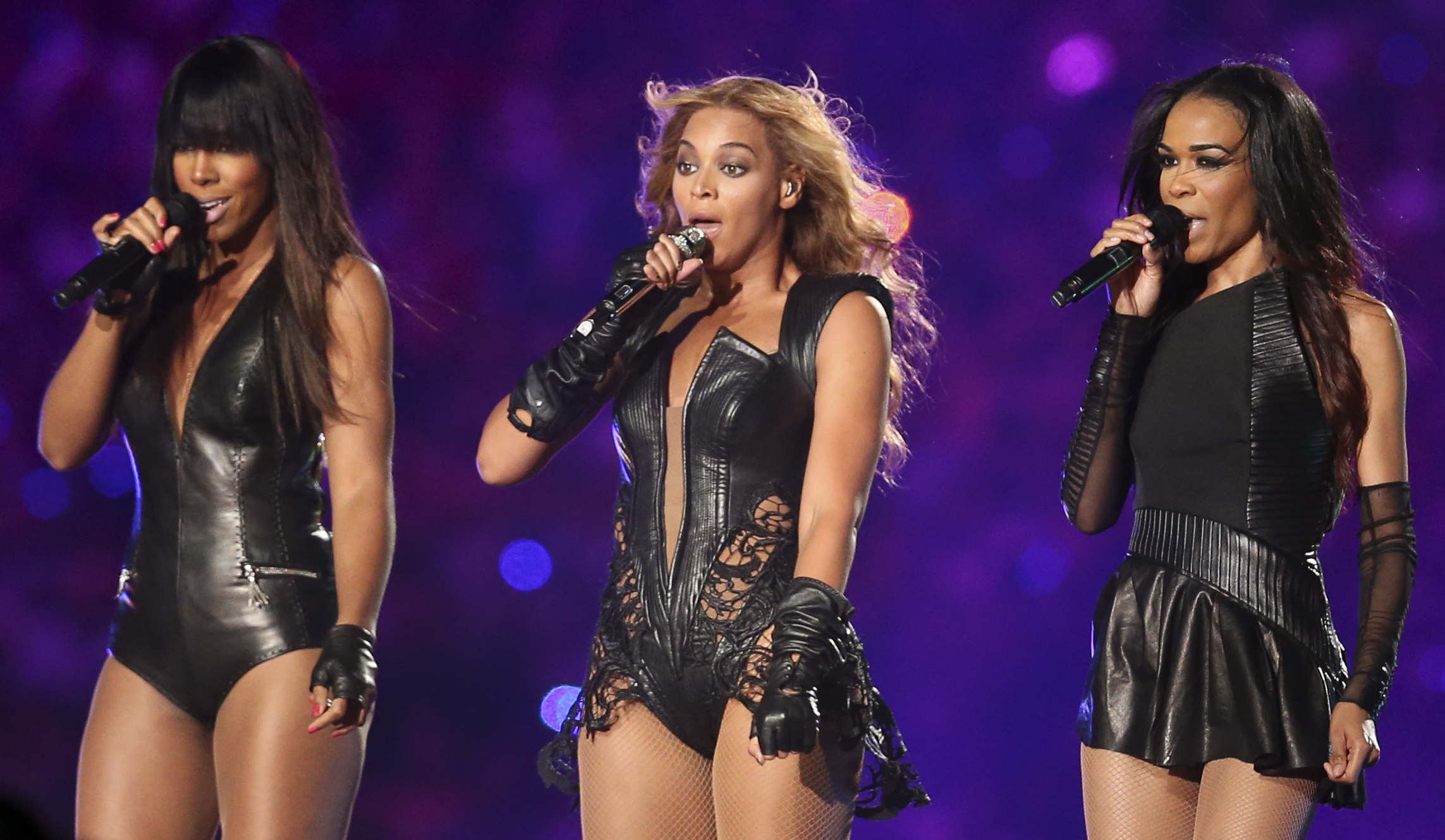
Beyoncé is joined by her Destiny's Child bandmates Kelly Rowland (left) and Michelle Williams (right).

Then Beyoncé started singing an a cappella version of the chorus of "Love on Top", which later led to a performance of "Crazy in Love" when as stated by Jon Caramanica of The New York Times Beyoncé was "virtually growling, giving that song a ferocity it has never before had". Beyoncé went on the perform "End of Time" which began with stomping dance. A performance of "Baby Boy" followed when Beyoncé danced while screens behind and below her projected clones of herself dancing the same choreography. Former Destiny's Child members Kelly Rowland and Michelle Williams joined her on stage, after being launched off the floor to perform "Bootylicious" and "Independent Women Part I" from the Charlie's Angels soundtrack which they finished with a pose in the form of the film's lead female characters. They continued with a version of Beyoncé's "Single Ladies (Put a Ring on It)". After they left the stage, Beyoncé said to the crowd, "Everybody put your hands toward me – I want to feel your energy!" and ended the show with an "emotional" rendition of "Halo". After her last song, Beyoncé told the crowd, "Thank you for this moment. God bless y'all".

== Reception ==
=== Critical ===
"Why would you ever have a Super Bowl without Beyoncé? Now that was a halftime show, and that is a star. This woman single-handedly blew out the power in the Superdome. No special guests, no costume changes – just Beyoncé, her heels, her thighs, her leather-and-lace corset and a freewheeling romp through her songbook, ignoring most of her proven crowd-pleasers just because she's Beyoncé and Beyoncé can get away with doing whatever Beyoncé feels like doing."

— Rob Sheffield, Rolling Stone

Beyoncé's performance was widely acclaimed by critics. Randall Roberts of the Los Angeles Times commented that Beyoncé's performance at the half time show "reconfirms her skills as a live performer, silencing anyone who might have wondered about them in the wake of a certain revelation." David Rooney of The Hollywood Reporter wrote: "Continuing in the vein of Madonna in 2012, [Beyoncé] steered the Super Bowl halftime show away from dad rock to embrace girl power." Melinda Newman of the website HitFix commented: "In a Super Bowl half-time performance that was as frenetic as it was fierce, [Beyoncé] delivered a sexy segment that was part Victoria's Secret fashion show, part tutorial on how to dazzle an audience." Jon Caramanica of The New York Times praised the performance at the show, commenting that "for 12 or so minutes... she balanced explosions and humanity, imperiousness with warmth, an arena-ready sense of scale with a microscopic approach to the details of her vocals. Amid all the loudness were small things to indicate Beyoncé was answering her skeptics, quietly but effectively." He finished his review with the conclusion that Beyoncé "the machine had made her point" and that the performance was "proof of life". Jim Farber of Daily News wrote in his review of the performance that "It's hard to think of a star better suited to the Super Bowl than she is". Dan Hyman of Rolling Stone magazine wrote in his review that Beyoncé "flaunted her supreme vocal and dancing chops throughout the halftime show" and added that the set's biggest moment was when she was joined on stage by her former bandmates. Rob Sheffield of the same publication praised the performance of Beyoncé's guitarist Bibi McGill during the show, commenting that it was a "ready-made obligatory-Slash-cameo guitar solo". He finished his review by writing, "The actual game wasn't bad, either. Sorry, 49ers. But there's no question who the night belonged to: Beyoncé."

=== Recognition ===
In March 2013, Michael Hogan of The Observer put the performance in his list of "The 10 best Beyoncé moments – in pictures". Beyoncé's performance at the Super Bowl XLVII halftime show received three nominations for the 65th Primetime Emmy Awards which took place on September 22, 2013. It was nominated in the categories for Outstanding Special Class – Short-Format Live-Action Entertainment Programs; Outstanding Technical Direction, Camerawork, Video Control for a Miniseries, Movie, or a Special; and Outstanding Lighting Design/Lighting Direction for a Variety Special eventually winning in the last category. In next year, the performance was nominated for Best Awards, Music, or Game Shows at 2014 Art Directors Guild.

=== Media ===
Nielsen ratings confirmed that the 2013 show was watched by 110.8 million viewers. Beyoncé's performance at the Super Bowl XLVII halftime show became the most tweeted-about moment in Twitter history with 268,000 tweets per minute.

In the week ending February 10, 2013, Beyoncé sold 220,000 digital song downloads in the US, while Destiny's Child sold 60,000; up 80% and 36% on the previous week, respectively.

== Set list ==
1. "Run the World (Girls)" (Intro) (Vince Lombardi "Excellence" speech voiceover)
2. "Love on Top"
3. "Crazy in Love"
4. "End of Time"
5. "Baby Boy"
6. "Bootylicious" (Destiny's Child)
7. "Independent Women Part I" (Destiny's Child)
8. "Single Ladies (Put a Ring on It)" (Destiny's Child)
9. "Halo"

Set list adapted from BBC.

== See also ==
- 2013 in American music
- 2013 in American television
