= End of Time (Beyoncé song) =

2012 single by Beyoncé

Single by Beyoncé

from the album 4
- Released: April 23, 2012
- Studio: MSR Studios (New York City)
- Genre: Afrobeat; latin jazz; dance-pop
- Length: 3:44
- Label: Columbia
- Songwriters: Beyoncé Knowles; Terius Nash; Shea Taylor; David Taylor
- Producers: Knowles; The-Dream

Beyoncé singles chronology
| "I Care" (2012) | "End of Time" (2012) | "Blow" (2013) |

Audio video
- "End of Time" on YouTube

"End of Time" is a song by American singer Beyoncé from her fourth studio album, 4 (2011). It was written by Beyoncé, Terius "The-Dream" Nash, Shea Taylor and David "Switch" Taylor while its production was handled by Beyoncé, Nash and Taylor. The song was initially promoted to be a follow-up to the lead single, "Run the World (Girls)" (2011). However, "Best Thing I Never Had" was ultimately chosen as the second single. "End of Time" was released as a single exclusively in the UK of April 23, 2012.

An uptempo song, "End of Time" exhibits the influence of Nigerian musician Fela Kuti; its bass line was inspired by the multi-instrumentalist's work. Also displaying elements of Afrobeat, the song's instrumentation includes marching band drums, percussion and horns. The high energy level provided by its instrumentation has similarities to several songs by Michael Jackson from the Off the Wall era (1979–80).

Following the release of 4, "End of Time" charted at number 62 on the UK Singles Chart and at number 20 on its R&B Chart, based solely on downloads. It also opened at number 26 on the South Korea Gaon International Singles Chart. The song peaked at number 13 on the US Billboard Bubbling Under Hot 100 chart. The song was part of Beyoncé's set list for her 4 Intimate Nights with Beyoncé, Revel Presents: Beyoncé Live and The Mrs. Carter World Tour revues.

The song was included in the Super Bowl XLVII halftime show set list.

== Development and recording ==
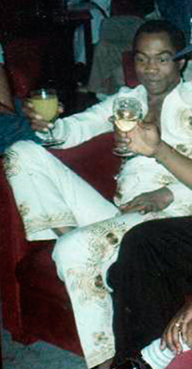
Beyoncé has said that "End of Time" was inspired by Fela Kuti (pictured)

From June 16 to 27, 2011, the songs from 4 were available to listen to in full each day on Beyoncé's official website, paired with its accompanying photo spread from the album packaging and a quote. On June 26, 2011, "End of Time" was the tenth song to be chosen. Beyoncé was motivated to record a song in the vein of "End of Time" after listening closely to the material of several rock musicians she saw at music festivals around the world; she analysed their lyrics and melodies, and the way they mixed different instruments at the same time. Beyoncé noted, "The instrumentation was just so beautiful. I felt I needed some classics like that." The bass line used in "End of Time" was inspired by the work late Nigerian music legend Fela Kuti, whom she appreciated for "the feel for the soul and heart of his music; it's so sexy, and has a great groove you get lost in. I loved his drums, all the horns, how everything was on the one. What I learned most from Fela was artistic freedom: he just felt the spirit." The song also uses a sample from "BTSTU" by Jai Paul.

"End of Time" was conceived at the MSR Studios in New York City, where Beyoncé and her team spent a few days with the band from Fela! - a Broadway musical based on Kuti's life. As stated Jordan "DJ Swivel Young, this period is accountable for the "Fela [Kuti] influence" in the song; this influence is further illustrated in its instrumentation that includes horns and percussion instruments. At the beginning, the production team played music with the band as they experimented with horns, percussion, drums, guitars and keys. DJ Swivel explained: "We'd be taking loops, like a section of percussion — congas for example — and then using them on a completely different record; and that record might be a completely different tempo or in a different key, so we'd literally be pitching it as we went. I used Elastic Audio [in Pro Tools] to fit and stretch it. Having fun is the best way I can put it; there were no rules."

Beyoncé, Terius Nash, Shea Taylor and Dave Taylor wrote the lyrics of the song while its production was handled by Beyoncé, The-Dream, Switch and Diplo. The-Dream and Switch incorporated elements of electronic music, modified some vocals, and created a synth intro sound, which is actually a vocal by the former producer. DJ Swivel noted, "The bass line is very musical, it's not just a plain [Roland TR-808] bass: It's got a vibe to it." The duo then arranged the music and Beyoncé worked on the vocal arrangements. Alex Asher, Johnny Butler, Jack Daley, Cole Kamen-Green, Drew Sayers, Nick Videen and Josiah Woodson played the instruments, and Pat Thrall recorded the music; Jordan Young recorded Beyoncé's vocals. Serban Ghenea then audio mixed the track before mix engineer did the final mixing with assistance from Phil Seaford, and audio engineers Chris Soper and Pete Wolford.

== Release and remix competition ==
At a private listening party for Beyoncé's fourth studio album was held on May 12, 2011; she offered a select group of fans previews of the music video for the lead single "Run the World (Girls)" and five other songs including, "End of Time". Several websites, including MTV News reported that there was speculation that it was a potential follow-up to "Run the World (Girls)". However a promotional single "1+1" was subsequently released on May 25, 2011. Columbia Records soon reported that "1+1" would not be sent for airplay as "Best Thing I Never Had" was favored to be the second single from 4. The song was released in the UK on April 22, 2012. It was reported by Digital Spy in early August 2011 that Beyoncé was filming new music videos for several songs from 4, including "End of Time" which had already been shot as of August 3, 2011.

On February 8, 2012, it was announced through Beyoncé's website and a press release issued by Parkwood Entertainment/Columbia Records that "End of Time" would be released as the fifth single from 4. It was added to the playlist of British national radio station BBC Radio 1 on March 28, 2012, and officially impacted UK contemporary hit radio on April 23, 2012. Preceding its release, Beyoncé called for a remix competition for the song in association with audio sharing site SoundCloud, which enabled votes on the submission of remixes by participants, who had to be at least 18 years of age. The contest, which was opened to entrants in 25 countries, lasted from February 8, 2012, to March 9, 2012; according to Beyoncé's website, the remix winner would win a cash prize of $4,000 and the remix would be included on her unspecified upcoming release.

Over two thousand entries have been uploaded to SoundCloud as of March 4, 2012, and the following day, another press release was issued, announcing the members of the international judging panel to choose the winner of the competition; the panel consists of Beyoncé, British musician Isabella Summers of Florence and the Machine, Dutch music producer and DJ Afrojack, the duo DJ and Polish producing team, WAWA, New York premier DJ Jus-Ske and Oscar-winning producer and composer Giorgio Moroder. After that the SoundCloud community have voted on entries, the top 50 ranked eligible remixes were reviewed by the announced panel of judges; the originality, creativity and musicality of these 50 remixes were taken into consideration while giving them corresponding scores that enabled the judges to choose the grand prizewinner. On April 17, the winner Radzimir "Jimek" Dębski, was announced through a press release. It was also announced that his remix will appear on Beyoncé's remix extended play (EP), 4: The Remix.

== Composition and lyrical interpretation ==
"End of Time" is an uptempo Afrobeat and Latin jazz song. The song consists of a bristling brass arrangement, and carries a heavy and ascending militaristic beat that is provided by marching band-style snare drums; other instrumentation includes a bass guitar, honking trumpets, staccato horns, a trombone, a tenor saxophone, a baritone saxophone and an alto saxophone. Thanks to the percussion instruments and the stomping beat that altogether provide a "towering sound", a high energy level is maintained throughout the song. Beyoncé adopts a "powerhouse voice" on "End of Time"; her vocals lines are supported by effects-laced backing vocals. She adopts a rapping-singing vocalization that bears resemblance to her vocals on the American R&B group Destiny's Child's 2000 song "Say My Name", a view shared by James Dihn of MTV News, who wrote that "End of Time" is reminiscent of "an older Destiny's Child cut".

Charley Rogulewski of AOL Music commented that "End of Time" channels American musician Quincy Jones and singer Michael Jackson's 1980 song "Off the Wall" with horns played midway through the song. Likewise, Brad Wete of Entertainment Weekly added that "End of Time" has some vibes of Jackson's 1983 song "Wanna Be Startin' Somethin'", the rhythm arrangement of which is a complex interweaving of drum machine patterns and horns. Adam Markovitz of the same publication noted that the horns used in "End of Time" are similar to those used during Jackson's Off the Wall (1979–80), before adding that it consists of a "bionic" beat, which recalls the work of American rhythm and blues vocalist Bo Diddley. Michael Cragg of The Observer also noted that the song channel the Off the Wall era. Priya Elan of NME noted that the chorus and the brass section of "End of Time" recall British musician Steve Winwood's 1982 song "Valerie". Matthew Horton of BBC Online said that the song was a "startling vision of Animal Collective covering Lionel Richie's All Night Long".

"End of Time"
A 22-second sample of the bridge "End of Time"; Beyoncé' voice looping over and over again in a fast and aggressive fashion.

Lyrically, "End of Time" is a declaration of co-dependence; Beyoncé professes her everlasting love to her romantic interest. As stated by Spencer Kornhaber of The Atlantic, "At the start, she's stricken by her own emotional vulnerability; by the end, she's empowered by it." The song opens with "spitfire drums" while Beyoncé sings in an almost distorted fashion, with her vocals layered underneath until a "dramatic explosion". As her vocals continue to build up, Beyoncé airily chants: "Come take my hand / I won’t let you go / I’ll be your friend / I will love you so deeply / I will be the one to kiss you at night / I will love you till the end of time." She continues her appeal as she sings to her love interest, "Take you away from here / There's nothing between us but space and time". On the bridge, Beyoncé belts her vocal lines over a shooting horn sequence; with her multiple-layered vocals, she commands, "Boy come to me", and towards the end, she repeatedly sings, "Say you’ll never let me go". Beyoncé "finds the strength in two" as she affirms to her romantic interest, "I just wanna be with you / I just wanna live for you / I'd never let you go!".

== Critical reception ==
"End of Time" was lauded by music critics, who appreciated its production, especially the beat; many of them noted it to be the outstanding track on the record. Noting that the song has "Fela Kuti vibes", Entertainment Weekly's Brad Wete commented that "End of Time" "sounds more like the new sound [Beyoncé] described" than "Run the World (Girls)". Likewise, Adam Markovitz of the same publication commended the song's "off-balance harmonies", before noting that "[it is] exactly the kind of genre-busting risk that few other current pop stars would even attempt, let alone pull off flawlessly with a no-big-thing shrug." Similarly, Charley Rogulewski of AOL Music wrote that "End of Time" reuses the "post-apocalyptic vibe" of "Run the World (Girls)", however with "more originality and a two-faced delivery". She also praised the way the "brash, marching militia-inspired beat is coupled to sweet lyrics". Priya Elan of NME commented that "End of Time" is "much more instantaneous" than "Run the World (Girls)", and added that its sneaky bassline, which is reminiscent of Lauryn Hill's work, "is the perfect counter-balance to those pesky military drums". He concluded that the song reminds listeners that Beyoncé is "a pretty stunning singer". Hamish MacBain of the same publication noted the Fela Kuti influence on the song and called it "the best thing" on the album.

Lewis Corner of Digital Spy rated the song with five stars out of five and wrote, "Add the star's sultry tones and a ludicrously addictive toe-trotting pre-chorus and it easily ranks as one of Bey[oncé]'s most colourful and fun cuts to date". In the review of 4, Corner also noted that the "carnival-styled brass sections stand out as the record's quirkier production elements, adding bursts of sass" to the song. Joanne Dorken of MTV UK wrote that the beat, which builds up throughout the song, gives it a "memorable sound" and makes it "insanely catchy". He concluded that "End of Time" is "guaranteed to fill a dance floor". Erika Ramirez of Billboard magazine called "End of Time" an addictive song, adding that it "hits strong from jump with the orchestration". In another review, she further praised The-Dream's production, the drums and said that it should have been released as the lead single from the album. Neil McCormick of The Daily Telegraph and Craig Jenkins of Prefix Magazine chose the song as a highlight of the album, with the later calling it "a joyfully vibrant collision of Afrobeat and Latin jazz". Jody Rosen of Rolling Stone commented that "End of Time" effectively shows that Fela Kuti was a big inspiration for Beyoncé while producing 4. Matthew Perpetua of the same publication commended the song for being one of the most adventurous cuts on 4; he noted that Beyoncé sings "lovey-dovey lyrics over an ecstatic, beat-heavy arrangement". Spencer Kornhaber of The Atlantic noted that the line "'Come take my hand, I will never let you go,' comes off as a reversal, an assertion of Beyoncé's own irreplaceability".

Greg Kot of the Chicago Tribune commented that "End of Time" is a glimpse of the "mad scientist" at work. Pitchfork Media's Ryan Dombal viewed the song as the "most strident declaration of co-dependence" on 4. He also wrote that it sounds like "En Vogue remixed by a high school pep band". Chris Coplan of Consequence of Sound commented that "End of Time" is a "grandiose track" that would adequately fit in Broadway musicals. Claire Suddath of Time magazine wrote that the song "is just screaming to be covered by an earnest high school a capella [sic] group and posted to YouTube". Ricky Schweitzer of One Thirty BPM noted that "End of Time" revisits "the kind of girl-power territory" that Beyoncé used to experiment with as a member of Destiny's Child. However, he wrote that "['End of Time'] is crisper, more tightly wound, and brimming with confidence that feels natural in a way that Beyoncé has never showcased before." Andy Gill of The Independent commented that "the vacuous lyric of 'End of Time' is just about salvaged by the syncopated marching-band shuffle groove". Tom Pakinkis of Music Week noted that "End of Time" lets Switch get his "stuttering vocal trickery and disco filters out". He further wrote, "The song starts off like a classic Switch production, with filters, sub bass and military drumming. It then sags a bit in the rather tune-free verses before a great chorus snatches victory." On The Village Voice's 2011 year-end Pazz & Jop singles list, "End of Time" was ranked at number 343.

== Chart performance ==
Before being released as a single, "End of Time" debuted at number 62 on the UK Singles Chart, and at number 20 on the UK R&B Chart on July 4, 2011. This debut was possible thanks to the 4,488 digital downloads the song sold during the week 4 was released. Selling 18,222 digital copies, the song opened at number 26 on the South Korea Gaon International Singles Chart for the week ending July 2, 2011. "End of Time" also charted at number 13 on the US Billboard Bubbling Under Hot 100 issue dated July 16, 2011.

== Live performances ==
"End of Time" was first performed by Beyoncé at Palais Nikaïa in Nice, France, on June 20, 2011, during a promotional concert in support of her then-upcoming album 4. The song was also part of her set list at her historic headlining Glastonbury Festival Performance on June 26, 2011. on June 26. The performance was taped and subsequently broadcast during the 2011 BET Awards on the same day. On August 14, 2011, Beyoncé performed "End of Time" in front of 3,500 fans during the 4 Intimate Nights with Beyoncé revue that was held at Roseland Ballroom in New York City. She was backed by her all-female band and her backing singers, called the Mamas. Flamboyant light displays were used to bring elaborate routines to the small stage. Jason Newman of Rap-Up commented that Beyoncé "viewed the reduced space as advantageous over limiting". Jon Caramanica of The New York Times wrote, "'End of Time' was the high point, a martial stomp with flamboyant drums, keening vocals and electrifying harmonies." Similarly, Brad Wete of Entertainment Weekly noted "End of Time" was among the several highlights of the show.

Jozen Cummings of The Wall Street Journal commented that "when [Beyoncé] went up-tempo on songs like 'End of Time', her virtuosic ability to engage in crisp choreography without cracking her huge voice took center stage." Dan Aguiliante of New York Post praised the performance of the song, noting that Beyoncé "shined" during "End of Time". Nekesa Mumbi Moody of ABC News wrote that the performance of the song was "infectious, marching-band inspired". Joycelyn Vena of MTV News concluded that "it was [Beyoncé's] ability to throw a party during faster jams like 'Party', 'Countdown', 'End of Time' and 'Run the World (Girls)' that put on full display her range as a performer, dancing and singing live the entire night." During the ITV special A Night with Beyoncé which aired on December 4, 2011, in the United Kingdom, Beyoncé performed "End of Time" to a selected crowd of fans.

In May 2012, "End of Time" was the opening song of Beyoncé revue show Revel Presents: Beyoncé Live held in Atlantic City, New Jersey, United States' entertainment resort, hotel, casino and spa, Revel. She was wearing a glimmering silver outfit and pink shoes designed by Ralph and Russo. According to Chuck Darrow of The Philadelphia Inquirer, "Among the most stunning examples of the optical wizardry were the blue-and-white columns of light that framed the curtain-raising 'End of Time'". During the beginning of the show, Beyoncé asked the crowd to stand up on their feet, and according to Caryn Ganz of Spin magazine, "quickly demonstrated her voice and hips are as limber as ever". Maura Johnston of The Village Voice reviewed the performance positively, saying: "The night started off with 'End of Time,' the militaristic yet ethereal paean to fidelity off her most recent album, 4. 'Say you'll never let me go,' a choir commands over a triple-time drumbeat, and as far as opening statements are concerned it was a convincing one; the small size of the venue and exclusivity of the gig ... also helped, as much of this audience was ready to eat out of the palm of her hand." A writer of Black Entertainment Television noted, "She dazzled fans with an assortment of high-energy performances of her upbeat hits like... 'End of Time.'" On February 3, 2013, Beyoncé performed the song during the Super Bowl XLVII halftime show. The song was also included to the set list during the 2013 shows of her Mrs. Carter Show World Tour.

=== Live videos ===
The live performance for "End of Time", which is on the DVD Live at Roseland: Elements of 4, premiered online on November 16, 2011, simultaneously with the live performance of "I Was Here". On the DVD, the performance of the song from the 4 Intimate Nights with Beyoncé revue was mixed with the performance of the song at the 2011 Glastonbury Festival and at the secret London gig at the O2 Shepherd's Bush Empire Beyoncé had in June 2011. While reviewing the live video, Gil Kaufman of MTV News called it the "opposite end of the spectrum, a red-laser-flashing uptempo dance marathon with Beyoncé and her four sexy backup dancers shaking it over the song's Brazilian drum beat". A sixty-second preview of the performance of the song at the Revel Presents: Beyoncé Live revue premiered online on Beyoncé's website on May 27, 2012. A writer of Rap-Up commented that "Sasha Fierce busts out some ferocious moves with her female dancers". Jacob Moore of Complex magazine wrote that Beyoncé "prove[d] she's still got it" during the footage of the performance. The video was also included in Beyoncé's first documentary Life Is But a Dream which aired on HBO on February 16, 2013.

== Flash mob and cover version ==
Several fans of Beyoncé swarmed Target, where the deluxe edition of 4 was exclusively available, for a flash mob on July 18, 2011. Led by former American Idol contestant and YouTube celebrity Todrick Hall, the dancers put down their red shopping baskets and started performing moves to "End of Time" as patrons snapped pictures on their cell phones. The dance crew, dressed in red, black, and white, grew in size as the performance carried on in the aisle of the retail store. Beyoncé's team showed their appreciation by posting the video on her website, writing that they were impressed. On April 13, 2012, Georgia McCarthy performed "End of Time" on the Australian talent show, Young Talent Time.

== Credits and personnel ==
Credits adapted from 4 liner notes.

- Beyoncé Knowles – vocals, producer, songwriter
- Alex Asher – trombone
- Johnny Butler – tenor saxophone
- Jack Daley – bass guitar
- Serban Ghenea – mixer
- Cole Kamen-Green – trumpet
- John Hanes – mix engineer
- Terius "The-Dream" Nash – producer, songwriter
- Wesley "Diplo" Pentz – additional production, songwriter
- Drew Sayers – tenor, baritone saxophone
- Phil Seaford – mix engineer assistant
- Chris Soper – engineer assistant
- David "Switch" Taylor – additional production, songwriter
- Shea Taylor – songwriter
- Pat Thrall – recorder
- Nick Videen – tenor, alto saxophone
- Pete Wolford – engineer assistant
- Josiah Woodson – trumpet
- Jordan "DJ Swivel" Young – vocals recorder

== Charts ==
| Chart (2011–12) | Peak position |
|---|---|
| Belgium (Ultratip Flanders) | 63 |
| Irish Singles Chart | 27 |
| South Korea International Singles Chart | 26 |
| UK R&B Chart | 13 |
| UK Singles Chart | 39 |
| US Billboard Bubbling Under Hot 100 Singles | 13 |
| US Hot Dance Club Songs (Billboard) | 33 |

== Certifications ==
| Region | Certification | Certified units/sales |
|---|---|---|
| Australia (ARIA) | Gold | 35,000^{‡} |
| Brazil (Pro-Música Brasil) | 2× Platinum | 120,000^{‡} |
| New Zealand (RMNZ) | Gold | 15,000^{‡} |
| United Kingdom (BPI) | Gold | 400,000^{‡} |
| United States (RIAA) | Platinum | 1,000,000^{‡} |
^{‡} Sales+streaming figures based on certification alone.

== Release history ==
| Region | Date | Format | Label | Ref. |
|---|---|---|---|---|
| United Kingdom | April 23, 2012 | Radio airplay | RCA | |
