= 4 Intimate Nights with Beyoncé =

2011 concert residency by Beyoncé

- Residency by Beyoncé
- Location: New York City, New York, U.S.
- Venue: Roseland Ballroom
- Associated album: 4
- Start date: August 14, 2011
- End date: August 19, 2011
- No. of shows: 4

Beyoncé concert chronology
- I Am... Yours (2009); 4 Intimate Nights with Beyoncé (2011); Revel Presents: Beyoncé Live (2012)

4 Intimate Nights with Beyoncé was the second concert residency by American singer-songwriter Beyoncé. Held during four non-consecutive nights in August 2011 at the Roseland Ballroom in New York City, the concerts were part of Beyoncé's campaign in support of her fourth studio album 4 (2011). All the songs on the standard version of the album, excluding "Start Over", were performed by her to a standing room-only audience of 3,200. Beyoncé also sang some of her previous hits from her three prior studio albums as well as songs she recorded with former girl group Destiny's Child in the 1990s and early 2000s. Wearing a linky gold sparkling mini-dress, she was backed by four female dancers and a 20-piece female band including a horn and orchestra section.

Tickets to the four concerts sold out in one minute. The first show, on August 14, 2011, received critical acclaim; Beyoncé's ability to perform under the circumstances of a smaller stage and a larger band was commended by contemporary music critics. A DVD of the show titled Live at Roseland: Elements of 4, which features performances from the concert, and never before seen personal footage from Beyoncé, including her times with Destiny's Child, traveling and partying with family, Beyoncé's rehearsal of "1+1" backstage at American Idol, other live performances and a sneak peek at her wedding dress, was released on November 21, 2011.

== Background ==
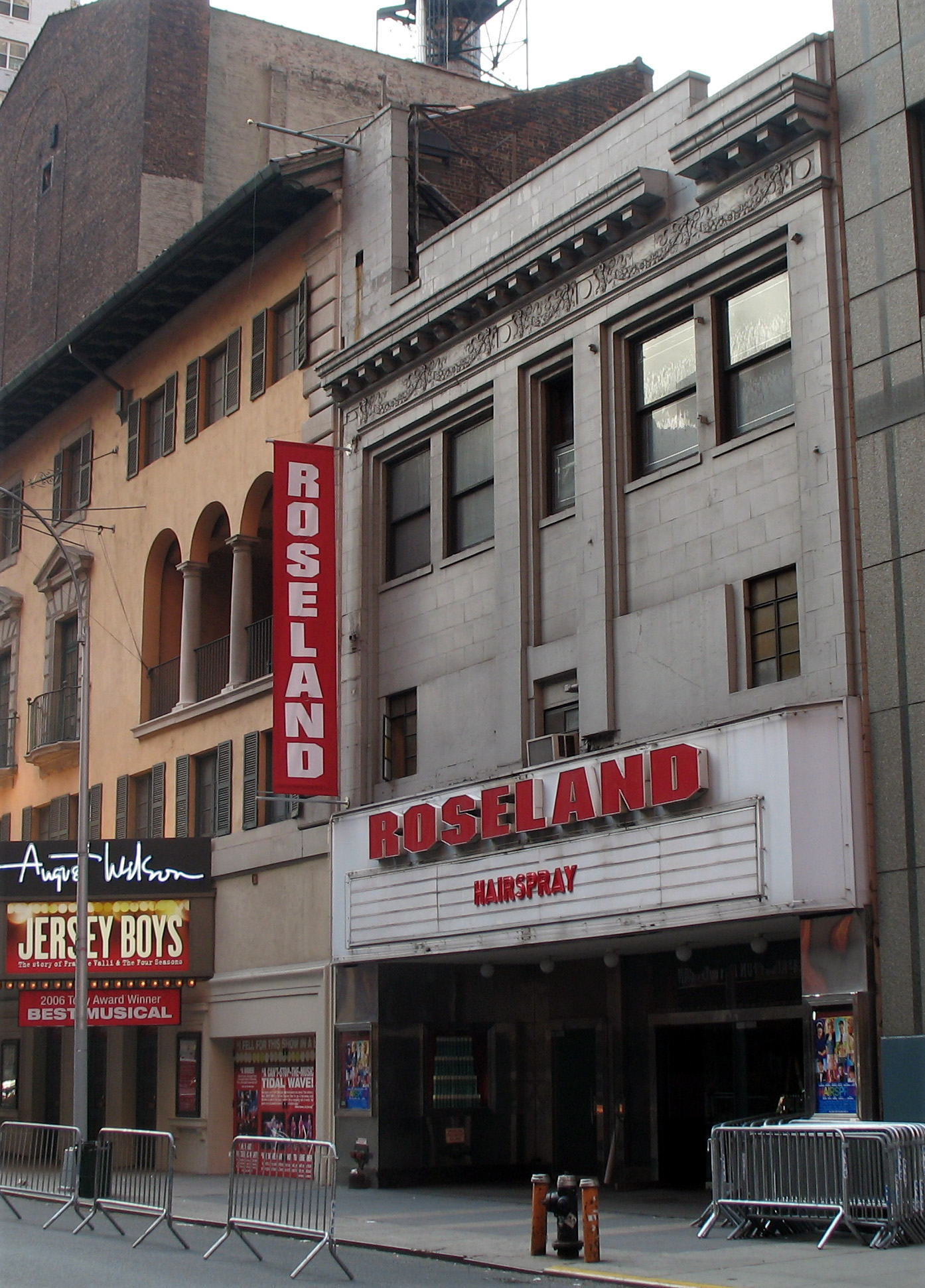
The concerts were held in New York City's Roseland Ballroom to a standing audience.

On August 5, 2011, Beyoncé's official website announced that she would be performing at New York City's Roseland Ballroom for four nights in the third week of August. The set on each night would be the entire collection of her fourth studio album, 4. Tickets for all four shows were available on August 10 on Ticketmaster. The first date went on sale to the general public at 1 p.m. EST, followed by the second show at 2 p.m. EST, third at 3 p.m. EST, and the final concert at 4 p.m. EST. Citi card-members were able to order tickets early with a pre-sale beginning at noon EST on August 10, 2011, through the Citi Private Pass Program. When tickets went on sale to the general public on August 10, 2011, for the first show of 4 Intimate Nights with Beyoncé on August 14, 2011, the date sold out in 22 seconds. Within the minute following the first sold out date, Columbia Records reported via Twitter that all four shows had sold out, stating "It's official @Beyonce's 4th & final show at Roseland Ballroom is SOLD OUT! Thats a total of 4 sold out shows next week!".

In a radio interview with Philadelphia's Power 99FM, Beyoncé's husband Jay-Z spoke in depth about the upcoming intimate shows and compared her to Michael Jackson stating, "I know that's blasphemy to compare the two because Mike was such an innovator, but I think she's like the second coming. You know, the hard work and dedication that she puts into her shows. It just makes you want to work harder at your own craft. She's like a machine."

== Development ==
"The concept is really smart and emotional and you see me as a human being more than just music and tells a story of how I got to this point and that's why I feel it's important —lets tell a story[...] I know that it's to do the record but I want it to be more of a show[...] It's more intimate —it's cooler than me just talking."

— Knowles in 4 Intimate Nights, Behind the Scenes (Part II)

On August 19, 2011, the first part of a concert's behind the scenes video was released. In the behind the scenes special, lead guitarist Bibi stated "She's listening to her inner voice right now and doing what she wants to do. I think she took risks. I think she's being more authentic and doing what she wants to do instead of doing what people expect, which is good." Kim, the show's musical director described the idea of the intimate concert, "This project is the most mature project for Beyoncé, because to be able to be in an intimate setting like this like the Roseland, which is a historic place, it's an amazing thing. I think the challenge of it is to be able to present your whole album as its own concept, as its own piece and it's a great way to educate the people about what this album means to her; It's for her, it's for the fans, it's for anybody."

The second part to the show's behind the scenes look was released on August 30, 2011. In the second part of the behind the scenes special, Beyoncé is shown calling the shots and rehearsing with her band, leading up to the sold-out shows and clips of fans waiting in line show appreciation and dedication for Beyoncé. The third part to the behind the scenes look was revealed on September 10, 2011. The behind the scenes third part showed the orchestra and back up dancers preparing for the performance as the instrumental to "I Was Here" plays in the background. Before Beyoncé takes to the stage, a clip of her praying with everyone involved in the concert is shown. On her way to the stage, Beyoncé describes in depth what she hopes to achieve during these 4 Intimate Nights stating, "I just want to give them everything I have. I'm so excited about performing the album, and it's just such a beautiful vibe inside people are just ready to dance and enjoy the music. —It's all good." The third part to the behind the scenes look ends with Beyoncé taking to the stage addressing the crowd with "Hello Roseland!" The fourth, and final, behind the scenes look into the intimate show was released exclusively through Citibank's Facebook page on September 14, 2011. The final part of the behind the scenes look was the commercial for the concerts' DVD release.

== About the show ==
=== Fashion and stage ===
During the show, Beyoncé performed in a gold lamé mini-dress courtesy of her mother, Tina, and shoes by Stuart Weitzman. She wore the slinky gold sparkling mini-dress throughout the entire show. Beyoncé was assisted on stage by four female dancers clad in shimmering black leotards. Georgette Cline of AOL's The Boombox stated that the metallic dress showed off her curves during the concert.

While on stage, Beyoncé was backed by a 20-piece all-female band and orchestra. The band consisted of a drummer, keyboarder, and guitarist and for the first time in Beyoncé's touring history, a horn section and an orchestra. The band additionally included, among others, two saxophonists, a guitar player, a seven-piece string section, a pianist and a conductor. Jon Caramanica of The New York Times noted that the all-female band plays an important spectacle to Beyoncé's performance, as she is both a part and in charge of the "army". Usually known for performing in arenas that hold 20,000 or more people, Beyoncé performed in standing-room-only Roseland, which holds a maximum capacity of 3,200 people.

During a behind the scenes look into the show, lighting designer Nick stated that the big moments of the album will be accompanied by big lighting from behind Beyoncé for the "epic big scenes", as opposed to performances such as "1+1", where Beyoncé is bathed in a single spotlight above a piano. In the second part of a behind the scenes look of 4 Intimate Nights with Beyoncé, it is revealed that Beyoncé was in charge of the orchestra's design and stage set-up, stating that a three level stage would be needed, allowing the back-up singers to be at the top and the orchestra to be on the same level as Beyoncé herself, as to allow viewers to see them.

=== Concert synopsis ===
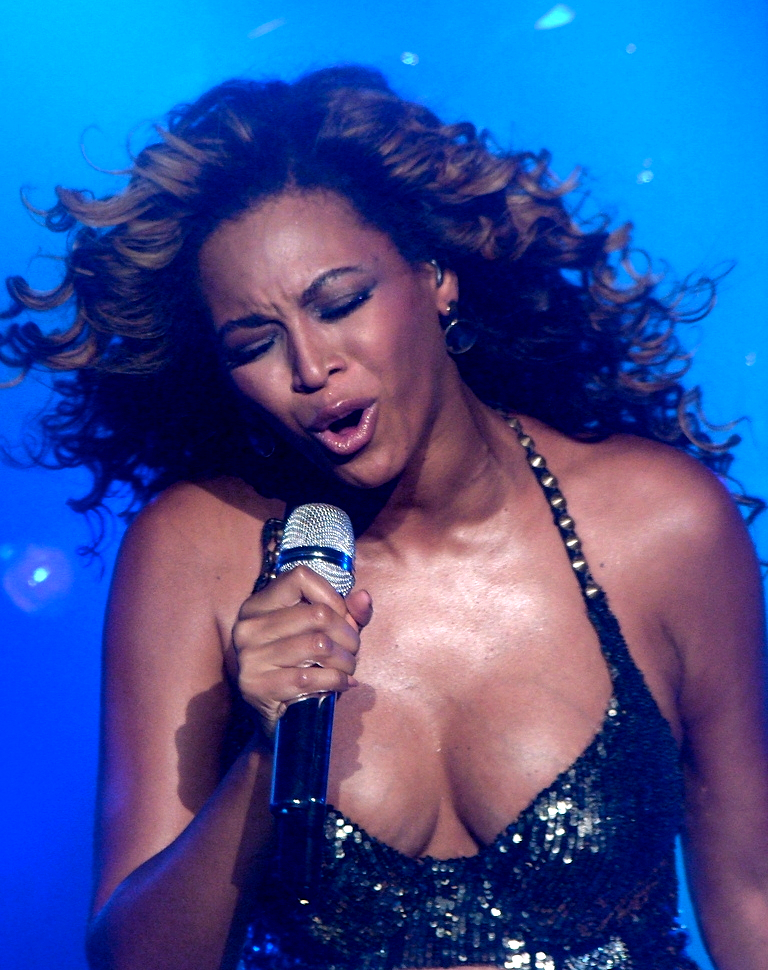
Beyoncé performing during the 4 Intimate Nights with Beyoncé.

The show begins with Beyoncé taking the stage stating "This is going to be a little different, y'all. It'll be more intimate" before she begins revealing multiple stories from her musical history including before—auditions with Destiny's Child starting at age nine, her father's early and frequent involvement managing his daughter's career and getting dropped by Elektra. After delving into her musical history, Beyoncé states "I just want to have a good time with y'all" before she begins the concert with her rendition of Michael Jackson's "I Wanna Be Where You Are". Following her rendition of "I Wanna Be Where You Are", Beyoncé begins a medley of past Destiny's Child songs, stopping each track to discuss her life and mindset during each stage of her career. During her performance of "Independent Women", she reveals how her father, Mathew Knowles, submitted the track to the Charlie's Angels (2000) soundtrack without permission, reveals that she wants to write a song "that celebrates a woman's curves" inspired by Stevie Nicks' guitar riff in "Edge of Seventeen" (1982) for "Bootylicious" and states "With a lot of success comes a lot of negativity...they were being nasty but it inspired me" before performing "Survivor".

After "'03 Bonnie & Clyde", the final song in the medley, Beyoncé began to tell the story of how her first album came to be, stating "[The label] told me I didn't have one hit song on my album. I guess they were kinda right. I had five!". Beyoncé then continued with a slowed-down, jazzier version of "Crazy in Love" allowing the orchestra to augment rather than transform the tracks. During the Ne-Yo penned "Irreplaceable", Beyoncé has the crowd assist her in her performance. After stating "On April 4, 2008, somebody put a ring on it," Beyoncé has the audience, which contained both men and women fliping their hands to "Single Ladies (Put a Ring on It)".

Beyoncé than begins to perform virtually all of 4, beginning with "1+1", where she is found kneeling atop a piano wrapped up in smoke and red hued lights, reminiscent to her performance on the American Idol finale. Beyoncé then continues down the original track listing of 4, following "1+1" with a rendition of "I Care" where she whipped her hair to the "brooding" brass and "ominous" beat of the song, while "bringing the song to life with an immaculate vocals". "I Miss You" begins with Beyoncé performing while seated, only to later be brought to her feet while altering the song's ending with additional vocals and instrumentation. "Best Thing I Never Had" follows afterwards, with a slight alteration in its melody. Beyoncé then sang "Party" as the crowd swayed their arms back and forth and stretched out the "y" to every other verse. Beyoncé than began harmonizing with the back-up singers for "Rather Die Young", before performing an up-tempo version of "Love On Top". Beyoncé would begin the countdown of "Countdown" later allowing the audience to finish the countdown from nine-to-one. "End of Time" and "Run the World (Girls)" had Beyoncé utilizing flamboyant light displays bringing elaborate routines to a smaller stage. The show ends with the last song — the self-empowering ballad "I Was Here" — with Beyoncé rephrasing the song's final chorus to say "Roseland, we were here."

== Critical response ==
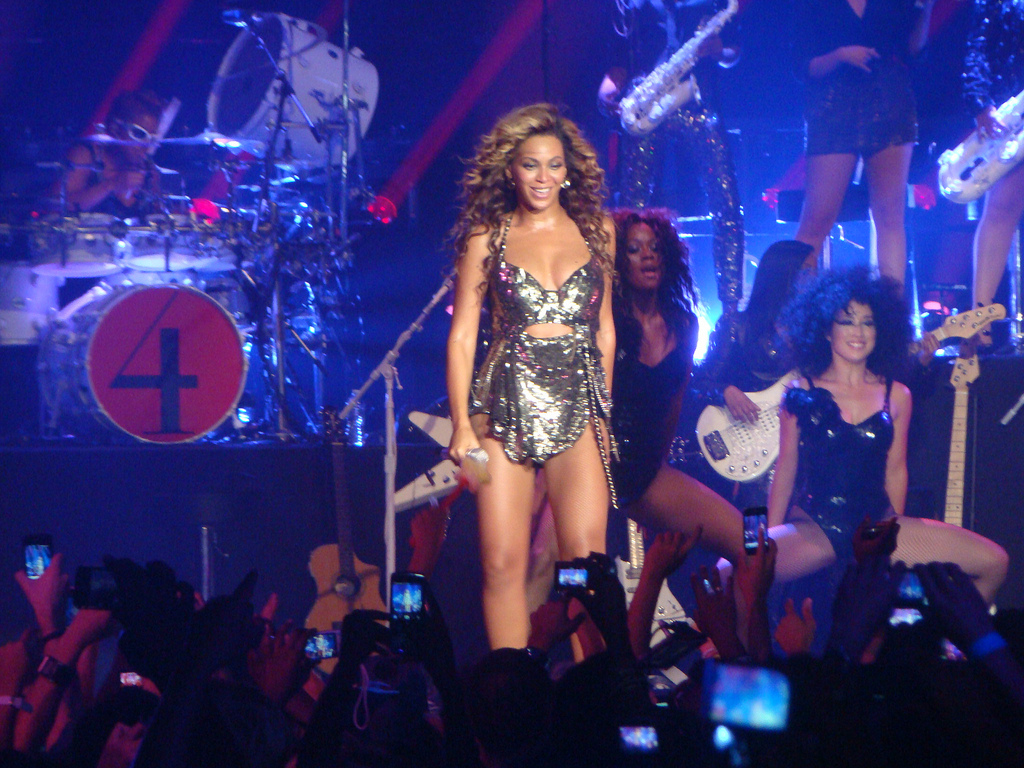
Although the song garnered mixed reviews from contemporary music critics, "I Was Here"'s live performance by Beyoncé was received with positive critical reception.

The concert residency received generally positive reviews from most music critics. Jason Newman of Rap-Up began his review, "For a singer long accustomed to stadiums, Sunday's show was the most intimate performance most fans would see from the ubiquitous superstar." He highlighted how she "split the difference between hushed torch singer and stadium belter", and favored her ability to display both "stamina and vigor, which make for a stadium-perfect show". Newman concluded, "The medley combined the quick blasts of a Las Vegas revue with the emotional candor of a singer-songwriter performing to a near-empty room. It was an odd, yet effective juxtaposition; a global superstar who could effortlessly shuffle between slick, bombastic R&B and awkwardly honest confessions of a tumultuous career. By the end of the set though, humility, as one expects from a singer with 16 Grammy awards and more than 75 million records sold worldwide, turned to sly confidence." Jon Caramanica of The New York Times was impressed by the show, complimenting Beyoncé's performances of "underdog tracks" such as "Party" and "Love on Top". He wrote:

In her performance it's always clear that a finely tuned engine is at work, but what was refreshing here was that it was in service of a surprisingly casual manner. She made funny, exaggerated faces; twirled her hair (when it was not floating); and spoke to the crowd like a knowing buddy. She was working off a teleprompter for her between-song patter, but improvising frequently, and for the better ... Beyoncé persevere[s], with a voice that skips up octaves and still gains power, with words that are as compelling as they are straightforward, with legs that treat the stage floor like an enemy in need of a thorough stomping. Even in moments of uncertainty, these are her constants. They survive her missteps.

Erika Ramirez of Billboard magazine wrote, "There aren't many artists in the world that can pull off a 90-minute set in Stuart Weitzman heels and leave a beyond packed audience satisfied to the point of not needing an encore." Nekesa Mumbi Moody of ABC News wrote that, "even queens need to show what it means to be royalty", and added that the show was a "dazzling rebuttal" to all negative chatter revolving 4. Moody concluded, "She put her track record up for display along with her new material with a subtle but undeniable message that she is not to be doubted, or counted against." Mike Wass of Idolator wrote that her "new depth and texture to quality material is almost as impressive as her uncanny knack for connecting with the audience on an emotional level".

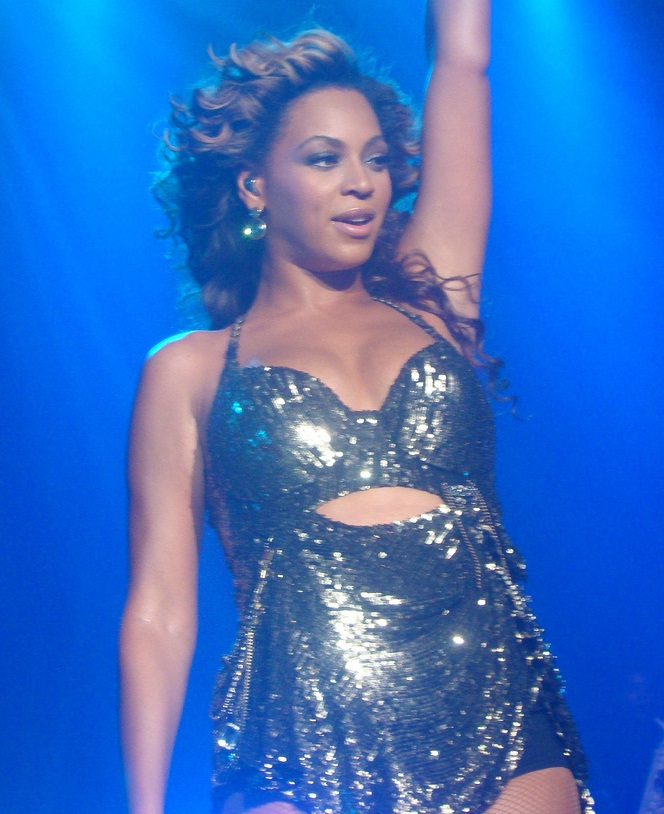
4 Intimate Nights with Beyoncé was commended by mainstream critics.

Entertainment Weekly's Brad Wete wrote that, "[Beyoncé's] excellence is undeniable", however stating "I'm looking forward to seeing her in a bigger venue, where there's more space for her voice to soar, elbow room for her band to play, and room for her wild-child fans to dance." Dan Aquilante of the New York Post stated that, "where tunes felt lackluster and flabby on the recording, Beyoncé injected a vibrancy in the new songs that boosted the material." Yolanda Sangweni of Essence magazine viewed the concert as a chance for Beyoncé to remind people that her "vocal chops" are what got her where she stands today as a singer.

Jocelyn Vena of MTV News praised Beyoncé for her "never-miss-a-note voice" and "razzle-dazzle dance moves", and for matching the crowd's energy with her enthusiasm during live performances. Jozen Cummings of The Wall Street Journal described the show as Beyoncé's "most intimate work to date", adding that it was "one in which there need not be a specific stand-out moment". Gavin DeGraw of VH1 noted that "there's no doubting Beyoncé's talent as a performer; her vocal ability, show(wo)manship, and charm." By contrast, Jody Rosen of Rolling Stone gave the show a mixed review, writing "a Beyoncé concert is a big, blowsy affair, a bit like a Las Vegas floor show crossed with a typhoon. 'Intimate' is not the adjective that leaps to mind." Rosen coined the live performance of "I Was Here" as "a hollow exercise in self-mythologizing". Maura Johnston of The Village Voice placed 4 Intimate Nights with Beyoncé on her list of The 10 Best Live Shows of 2011. In a review of the show, she commented "The serenity at her core is borne from a supreme amount of confidence; that it comes off as something generously given is a testament to her prodigious talents as a performer. At the very least, we can all learn breath control from her."

== Broadcasts and recordings ==
To promote the show, photographer Myrna Suarez photographed Beyoncé on stage during the first and second nights of the concert. The photos were then published and used in reviews by Rap-Up, The Wall Street Journal, Entertainment Weekly, Rolling Stone, and Billboard magazine.

A DVD of the show titled, Live at Roseland, was released exclusively to Walmart in the United States on November 21, 2011, and a two-disc DVD deluxe package re-titled, Live at Roseland: Elements Of 4, was released worldwide on November 29, 2011, worldwide. The collection features the full concert, bonus offstage personal footage by Beyoncé, a 20-page booklet and a video anthology that includes seven music videos from 4. The DVD was directed by Beyoncé, Ed Burke and Anthony Green, and was executively produced by Beyoncé. It features performances from the 4 Intimate Nights with Beyoncé concert. The album was commercially successful, debuting at number two on the Billboard Top Music Videos chart in the US on November 27, 2011, which also became its peak position. The standard edition of the album was certified gold while the deluxe edition was certified platinum by the Recording Industry Association of America (RIAA). It became the second best-selling DVD of 2011 in the US. It was also the second best-selling DVD worldwide in 2011.

In September 2011, Beyoncé posted several previews of the behind-the-scenes footage of the concert online. The live performances for "End of Time" and "I Was Here", which were added on the DVD, premiered online on November 16, 2011. The performances for "I Miss You" and "Independent Women", premiered online the next day via BET.com. The complete concert film premiered exclusively on Vevo on November 20 at 5:00 p.m. The live performance of "I Care" from the DVD was posted online on December 21, 2011. As part of the promotion, the concert was also aired on network televisions, being broadcast on December 25, 2011, on British television channel 4Music and on December 30 on Channel 4. The video for "Love on Top" premiered online in January 2012 and was released on the iTunes Store on January 11, 2012.

== Set list ==
1. "I Wanna Be Where You Are"
2. "No, No, No"
3. "Bug a Boo"
4. "Bills, Bills, Bills"
5. "Say My Name"
6. "Jumpin', Jumpin'"
7. "Independent Women"
8. "Bootylicious" / "Survivor"
9. "'03 Bonnie & Clyde"
10. "Crazy in Love"
11. "Dreamgirls"
12. "Irreplaceable"
13. "Single Ladies (Put a Ring on It)"
14. "1+1"
15. "I Care"
16. "I Miss You"
17. "Best Thing I Never Had"
18. "Party"
19. "Rather Die Young"
20. "Love On Top"
21. "Countdown"
22. "End of Time"
23. "Run the World (Girls)"

Encore

24. "I Was Here"

Additional notes

- "Bug a Boo" was added to the "Destiny's Child Medley" after the second concert on August 16.
