= Live at Roseland: Elements of 4 =

Video by Beyoncé
- Released: November 21, 2011
- Recorded: August 14–19, 2011
- Venues: Roseland Ballroom (New York City)
- Genres: Pop; R&B
- Length: 150 minutes
- Language: English
- Labels: Parkwood; Columbia
- Directors: Beyoncé Knowles; Ed Burke; Anthony Green

Beyoncé chronology
I Am... World Tour (2010)	Live at Roseland: Elements of 4 (2011)	Live in Atlantic City (2013)

Live at Roseland: Elements of 4 is a video album by American singer Beyoncé. It was released on November 21, 2011, through Parkwood Entertainment and Columbia Records. The album features a concert film which was filmed during Beyoncé's 4 Intimate Nights with Beyoncé revue, held at the Roseland Ballroom in New York City between August 14–19, 2011.

Sony Music Entertainment and Columbia Records promoted Live at Roseland: Elements of 4 by holding screenings of the film. The album was also promoted by posting teasers and live performances of some songs. Seven music videos which were placed on the album were also released prior to its official release. The complete concert film premiered exclusively on Vevo on November 20, the day prior to album's release. The same day, Beyoncé held a screening of the film at the Paris Theater in New York City, which was attended by fans. Live at Roseland received positive response from music critics who praised Beyoncé's live performances during the revue, the album's documentary style and the intimate footage from Beyoncé's personal life. The album was also included on several year-end lists of best DVDs of 2011.

Upon its release, the album charted on several international charts, topping the Dutch Music DVD chart and peaking at number two on the US Top Music Videos, charting within the top ten in almost every European country upon its release. The standard edition of the album was certified gold, and the deluxe edition was certified platinum by the Recording Industry Association of America (RIAA). It was also certified platinum by the Australian Recording Industry Association (ARIA) and gold by the Polish Society of the Phonographic Industry (ZPAV).

== Background and development ==
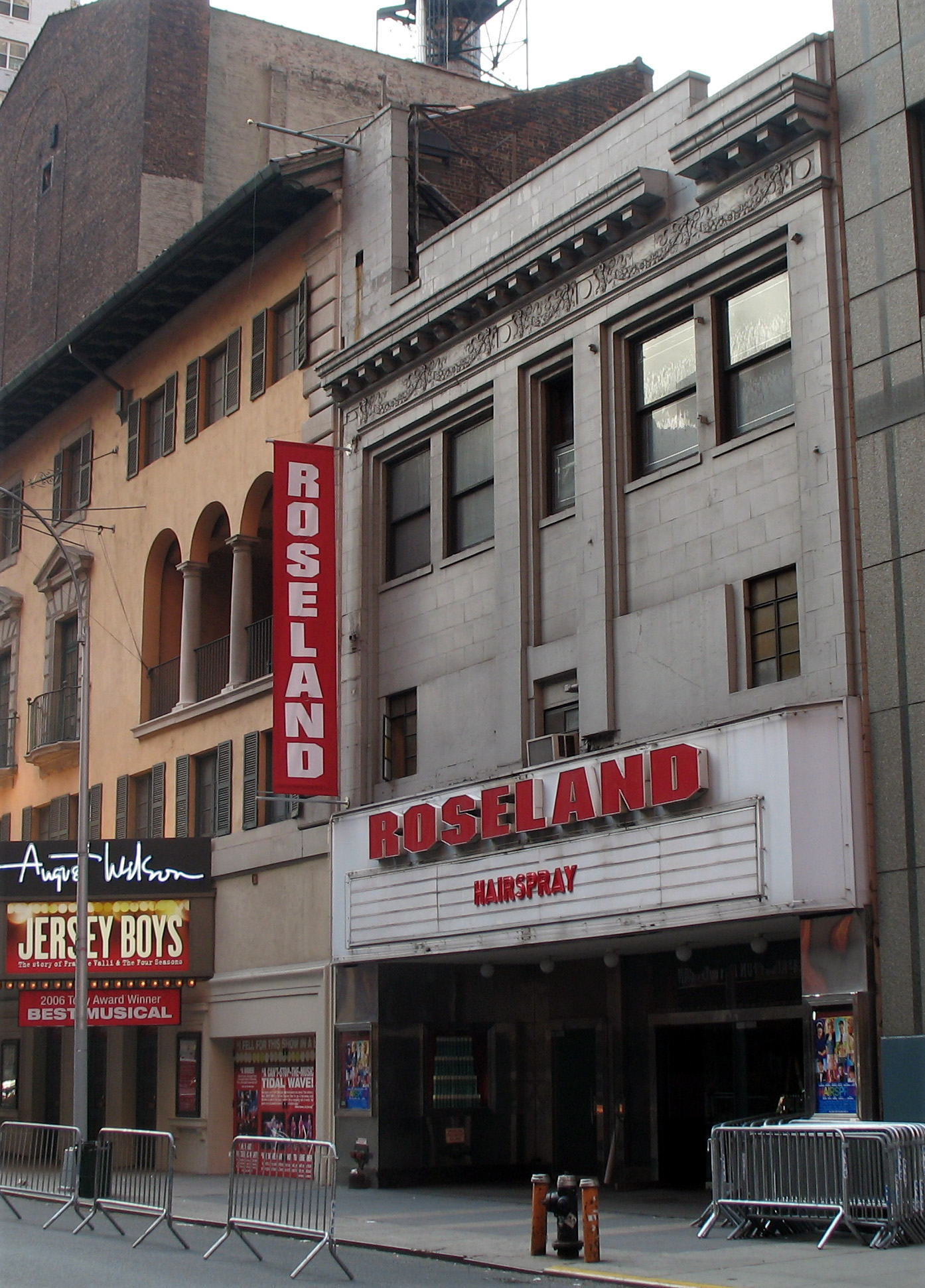
The revue was held at Roseland Ballroom in New York City to a standing audience.

Live at Roseland was directed by Beyoncé, Ed Burke and Anthony Green, and was executively produced by Beyoncé. The film features performances from Beyoncé's 4 Intimate Nights with Beyoncé revue, which was held at the Roseland Ballroom in New York City in August 2011. The concert was held on four non-consecutive nights, where Beyoncé performed songs from her fourth studio album 4 (2011), as well as her previous hits in prior albums and with former girl group Destiny's Child.

Backed by her all-female band, the performances included stories detailing Beyoncé's journey before the album 4, including her years before and with Destiny's Child. Live at Roseland also includes never before seen personal footage from Beyoncé, including her times with Destiny's Child, traveling and partying with family, Beyoncé's rehearsal of "1+1" backstage at American Idol which was filmed by her husband Jay-Z, other live performances and a sneak peek at Beyoncé's wedding dress. Some of the behind-the-scenes footage in the album was previously placed on Beyoncé's live album I Am... Yours: An Intimate Performance at Wynn Las Vegas (2009).

== Release ==
The standard edition of the album, titled Live at Roseland, was released exclusively through Walmart in the United States on November 21, 2011; it includes the concert film. The deluxe edition, titled Live at Roseland: Elements of 4 was released as a two-disc DVD on November 25, 2011, which additionally includes: "Roseland: Behind the Stage" - behind the scenes footage of the concert, Elements of 4 - music videos of seven tracks from 4, and a twenty-page booklet. It includes videos for "1+1", "Best Thing I Never Had", "Party", "Love on Top", "Countdown", "Run the World (Girls)" and "Dance for You". Beyoncé partnered with Treemo Labs to create the Beyoncé: Live at Roseland app, which was made available on January 5, 2012, for iPhones and iPads. The app features the entire concert and photo gallery of the performances during the 4 Intimate Nights with Beyoncé revue as well as the bonus contents "Behind the Stage" from the Roseland Ballroom and a "Behind the Camera" from Beyoncé's music videos. On March 22, 2012, Live at Roseland: Elements of 4 was made available worldwide.

== Promotion ==
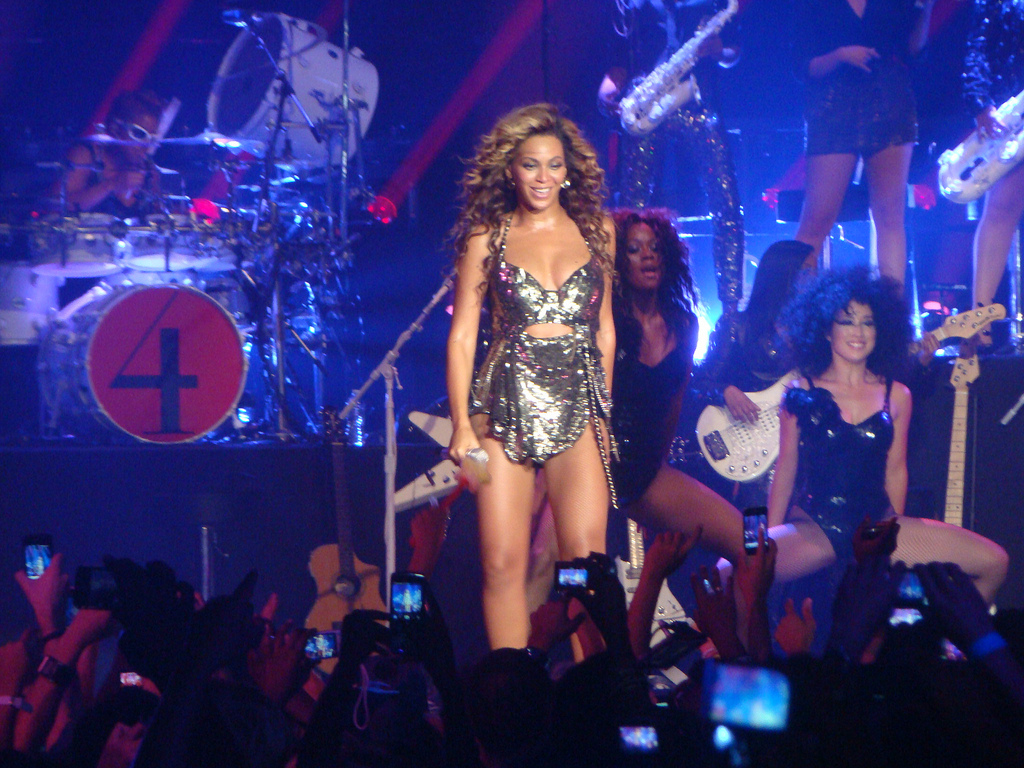
On the DVD, the performance of "End of Time" from the revue was mixed with the performance of the song at the 2011 Glastonbury Festival and at the secret gig at the O2 Shepherd's Bush Empire in London Beyoncé had in June 2011.

In September 2011, Beyoncé posted several previews of the behind-the-scenes footage of the concert online. On November 7, 2011, Sony Music held two screenings of the film at their New York City offices, in presence of staff from Rolling Stone magazine, Essence, Reuters, Billboard, British journalist Piers Morgan, Angel Laws of Concrete Loop and Kierna Mayo of Ebony. A one-minute promo trailer of Live at Roseland: Elements of 4 was released online on November 9, 2011. The live performances for "End of Time" and "I Was Here", which were added on the DVD, premiered online on November 16, 2011. The performances for "I Miss You" and "Independent Women Part I", premiered online the next day via BET.com. The complete concert film premiered exclusively on Vevo on November 20 at 5:00 pm. The same day, Beyoncé held a screening of the film at The Paris Theater in New York City, which was attended by fans. On November 16 and 17, 2011 respectively, Rap-Up and The Village Voice collaborated with Columbia Records and organized a contest on their official website where six readers of the magazines could win tickets for the screening of the film. At the screening, Knowles talked about her 4 Intimate Nights with Beyoncé revue with the Associated Press, saying:

"The whole time I definitely was thinking, 'Everyone knows, everyone can see.'... I just wanted to give everything I could ... When you're pregnant, it's a little bit harder to breathe, so it was hard doing all the choreography and singing at the same time. I just got my strength from all the love from the fans. I can see all of my super fans in the audience when I'm performing because they're doing the choreography harder than me. Some of the fans were like, 'B[eyoncé], you better put me in this DVD.' So I made sure I did."

She further explained the inclusion of videos in the DVD, stating: "I've always done video diaries. I don't Tweet, but it's still important people get a sense of who I am." The seventh music video from the video anthology, "Dance for You", premiered online on November 25, 2011. The live performance of "I Care" from the DVD was posted online on December 21, 2011. As part of the promotion, the concert was also aired on network televisions, being broadcast on December 25, 2011, on British television channel 4Music and on December 30 on Channel 4. The live video for "Love on Top" premiered online in January 2012 and was released on the iTunes Store on January 11, 2012.

== Film synopsis ==
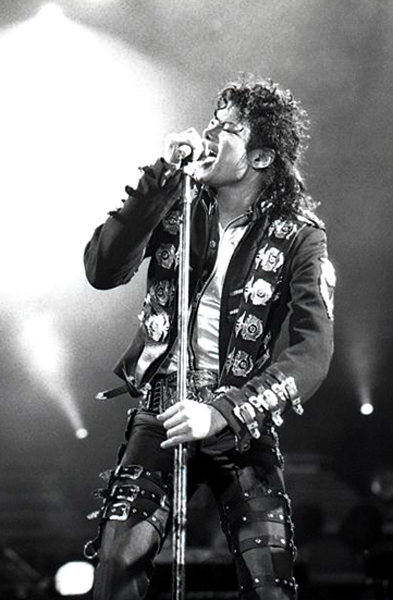
Beyoncé opened the show with "I Wanna Be Where You Are" by Michael Jackson (pictured) during the revue. She also covered the song during her revue I Am... Yours (2009).

The show begins with Beyoncé stating: "This is going to be a little different, y'all. It'll be more intimate" before she begins revealing multiple stories from her musical history including before—auditions with Destiny's Child starting at the age of nine, her father's early and frequent involvement managing his daughter's career and getting dropped by Elektra Records. After delving into her musical history, Beyoncé says "I just want to have a good time with y'all" before beginning the revue's set list with her rendition of Michael Jackson's "I Wanna Be Where You Are" (1972).

Following her rendition of "I Wanna Be Where You Are", Beyoncé begins a medley of past Destiny's Child hits, stopping each track to discuss her life and mindset during each stage of her career. During her performance of "Independent Women" she reveals how her father, Matthew Knowles, submitted the track to the Charlie's Angels soundtrack (2000) without permission, revealing that she wanted to write a song "that celebrates a woman's curves" inspired by Stevie Nicks' guitar riff in "Edge of Seventeen" (1982) for "Bootylicious" and states "With a lot of success comes a lot of negativity ... they were being nasty but it inspired me" before performing "Survivor".

After "'03 Bonnie & Clyde", the final song in the medley, Beyoncé began to tell the story of how her first album came to be, stating "[The label] told me I didn't have one hit song on my album. I guess they were kinda right. I had five!" Beyoncé than continued with a slowed-down, jazzier version of "Crazy in Love," allowing the orchestra to augment rather than transform the tracks. During "Irreplaceable", Beyoncé has the crowd assist her in her performance. After stating "On April 4, 2008, somebody put a ring on it", Beyoncé has the audience, which contained both men and women ranging from ages eight to thirty-eight, flip their hands to the Billboard Hot 100 number-one hit "Single Ladies (Put a Ring on It)".

Beyoncé then begins to perform virtually all of 4, starting with "1+1", where she is found kneeling atop a piano wrapped up in smoke and red hued lights, reminiscent to her performance on the American Idol season ten finale. Beyoncé than continues down the original track listing of 4, following "1+1" with a rendition of "I Care" where she whipped her hair to the brooding brass and ominous beat of the song, while bringing the song to life with immaculate vocals. "I Miss You" begins with Beyoncé performing while seated, only to later be brought to her feet while altering the song's ending with additional vocals and instrumentation. "Best Thing I Never Had" follows afterwards, with a slight alteration in the song's melody. Beyoncé then slow-winds to "Party" as the crowd swayed their arms back and forth and stretched out the "y" to every other verse. Beyoncé then began harmonizing with the back-up singers for "Rather Die Young", before following a heavily choreographed version of "Love On Top" which gave the song an uptempo overhaul.

Beyoncé would begin the countdown of "Countdown" later allowing the audience to finish the countdown from nine to one. "End of Time" and "Run the World (Girls)" had Beyoncé using flamboyant light displays bringing elaborate routines to a smaller stage. The show ends with the last song—the self-empowering ballad "I Was Here"—with Beyoncé rephrasing the song's final chorus to say "Roseland, we were here."

== Critical reception ==
Professional ratings
Review scores
Source	Rating
Daily Express	4/5 stars
Jam!	4/5 stars
People	3.5/4 stars
The New York Times	(favorable)
VH1	(favorable)

Live at Roseland received positive reviews by music critics, who praised the performances of the songs, Beyoncé's vocal abilities and its documentary style. Nate Chinen of The New York Times compared the DVD with the album Live at the Royal Albert Hall (2011) by British singer Adele which was also released on November 25, 2011. He noted that the albums "share some intriguing affinities", commenting: "Naturally there's the valorization of powerful, agile singing; there are explicit expressions of gratitude, amid an implicit air of conquest.

Pointedly, too, there's the suggestion of performance as testimony, the set list as personal narrative. In both cases the theme of female self-empowerment plays out, sometimes a bit awkwardly, against the fact of an unnamed but specific male partner." However, Chien commented that Live at Roseland "makes an airtight spectacle out of movement." USA Today's Elysa Gardner mentioned the DVD along with Adele's Live at the Royal Albert Hall as the leading DVDs for December 2011.

Kat George of VH1 gave a positive review for the album, describing the scenes as "moving, inspirational and infectious" while also calling them "immaculately produced." She further wrote that "Tight and succinct, there's no filler in the Live At Roseland DVD — it's high energy from the beginning to the end, and doesn't give you a chance to lag or lose interest." George went on to describe the album as "intimate", which according to her gives "the magic of Beyoncé — even when she's speaking to the masses, she's really speaking to you, and you alone." She finished her review saying that the album gives a personal evening with Beyoncé along with "absolute grace and ultimate humility." Sian-Pierre Regis of MTV described the album as a "glitzy doc-style flick" and noted that Beyoncé shows her "softer" side while also calling her a "gift that keeps on giving." Entertainment Weekly's Melissa Maerz wrote that "According to ... DVD Live at Roseland... [which] finds Beyoncé telling her life story through her songs ... [she] has done a whole lot of amazing things in her life."

Andrew Martin of Prefix Magazine noted, "It's [Live at Roseland] being called her most personal work to date, and from the looks of it, that assessment isn't too far off." Writing for The Wrap, Chris Willman compared the album with the American documentary show This Is Your Life. Willman also commented that the album was "highly impressive, and almost all a little annoying, if solipsism isn't your thing" and that "even at her most egotistical, she's [Beyoncé] strangely never less than utterly likeable. She might actually be the world's most good-natured megalomaniac." He also called Beyoncé "fairly glorious" and noted that "the live versions of the '4' material are more invigorating than the studio equivalents, with Beyoncé's eight-piece all-female band making everything sound like the great cross-pollination of contemporary urban and '70s soul you'd hope for."

Praising Beyoncé's "animal magnetism" during the performances of the songs, Simon Gage of Daily Express said that "Beyoncé shines when it comes to performing". Chuck Arnold of People magazine commented that the songs from 4 sound "even better" performed on the live album. Darryl Sterdan of the website Jam! said in his review, "With her usual blend of divatastic majesty, girl-next-door intimacy and boundless energy, B[eyoncé] ... rewinds her career and performs her latest CD at a NYC ballroom."

== Accolades ==
A writer of The Boston Globe put the album on the list of "Best DVDs for gifting this season" for 2011 saying: "For better or worse, Beyoncé's videos for her latest album, '4', have been buzzed about this year, and the double-disc deluxe edition gathers them all on one DVD." The writers of Billboard also put the album on their list of "Best Documentary & Live DVDs" for gifting in 2011. The writers commented that the DVD was "a chance to experience [her] recent sold-out concerts with a virtual front row courtesy". They further added that it contained "the best of her four night stand". Sasha Frere-Jones of The New Yorker mentioned the album on his list of "The Best Music of 2011: The American Singers" praising the "tightly corralled ecstasies" of the revue further commenting: "It was thrilling to watch [the album] not because the show was unusually clever—Beyoncé was simply born to be on stage, wear shiny clothes, and work a room—but because Beyoncé means it, wants it, has the voice, and knows whom to hire to flesh out her ideas." He added: "And this vision does seem to be hers, as it's too idiosyncratic a mesh of tastes and textures to reflect some timid P.R. plan." The live video of "I Was Here" from Live at Roseland received a nomination at the 43rd NAACP Image Awards presented on February 17, 2012, in the category for Outstanding Music Video.

== Commercial performance ==
Live at Roseland: Elements of 4 debuted at number three on the US Top Music Videos on December 10, 2011. The following week it climbed to number two, which also became its peak position, behind Adele's Live at the Royal Albert Hall (2011). It further spent various weeks on the chart. The standard edition of the album was certified gold while the deluxe edition was certified platinum by the Recording Industry Association of America (RIAA). It became the second best-selling DVD of 2011 in the United States, and the third in 2012.

In the United Kingdom, the album debuted at number eight on the UK Music Videos on December 7, 2011. In Australia, the album peaked at number three on the Australian Music DVD Chart. It was certified platinum by the Australian Recording Industry Association (ARIA) for selling over 15,000 copies. In Poland, the album was certified gold by the Polish Society of the Phonographic Industry (ZPAV) in its first week, selling more than 5,000 copies. On the German Music DVD Chart, Live at Roseland: Elements of 4 debuted at number ten on December 15, 2011. Live at Roseland: Elements of 4 debuted at number four on the Dutch DVD Chart on December 3, 2012.

On February 11, 2012, in its eleventh week on the chart, the album reached number one. It became the twenty-third and eleventh best-selling album in the country in 2011 and 2012, respectively. On the Oricon DVD chart in Japan, the album peaked at number sixty-two on January 1, 2012. It became the second best-selling music DVD of 2011 in the world.

== Track listing ==
=== Standard edition ===
Live at Roseland - The Journey B 4...
No.	Title	Length
1.	"Intro"	1:54
2.	"I Wanna Be Where You Are"	2:37
3.	"No, No, No Part 1"	1:30
4.	"No, No, No Part 2"	1:19
5.	"Bug a Boo"	0:32
6.	"Bills, Bills, Bills"	0:45
7.	"Say My Name"	0:46
8.	"Jumpin', Jumpin'"	0:30
9.	"Independent Women Part I"	2:27
10.	"Bootylicious"	1:50
11.	"Survivor"	2:16
12.	"'03 Bonnie & Clyde"	1:01
13.	"Crazy in Love"	6:01
14.	"Dreamgirls"	1:02
15.	"Irreplaceable"	2:02
16.	"Single Ladies"	3:34

Live at Roseland - 4
No.	Title	Length
17.	"I Care"	4:05
18.	"I Miss You"	3:23
19.	"Run the World"	2:55
20.	"1+1"	5:37
21.	"Party"	3:09
22.	"Love on Top"	4:22
23.	"Best Thing I Never Had"	5:12
24.	"Countdown"	3:10
25.	"Rather Die Young"	3:44
26.	"End of Time"	3:45
27.	"I Was Here"	8:46

=== Deluxe edition ===
Live at Roseland
No.	Title	Length
28.	"Roseland: Behind the Stage"	6:29

Elements of 4
No.	Title	Director(s)	Length
1.	"1+1"	Beyoncé; Lauren Briet; Ed Burke	4:27
2.	"Best Thing I Never Had"	Diane Martel	4:13
3.	"Party" (featuring J. Cole)	Beyoncé; Alan Ferguson	3:40
4.	"Love on Top"	Beyoncé; Burke	3:15
5.	"Countdown"	Beyoncé; Adria Petty	3:33
6.	"Run the World (Girls)"	Francis Lawrence	4:55
7.	"Dance for You"	Beyoncé; Ferguson	5:11
8.	"Beyoncé: Behind the Camera"		20:00

== Personnel ==
Credits adapted from album's liner notes.

- Mathieu Asselin – contributing photographer
- Susannah Benjamin – contributing photographer
- Ed Burke – director
- Francesco Carrozzini – contributing photographer
- Patrick Demarchelier – contributing photographer
- Tony Duran – contributing photographer
- Greg Gex – contributing photographer
- Anthony Green – director
- Sharif Hamza – contributing photographer
- Ty Hunter – stylist
- Beyoncé – director, executive producer
- Adam Larson – art director
- Alexi Lubomirski – contributing photographer
- Julie Platner – contributing photographer
- Shaul Schwarz – contributing photographer
- Raquel Smith – stylist assistant
- Myrna Suárez – contributing photographer
- Jenke-Ahmed Tailly – creative director
- Ellen von Unwerth – contributing photographer

== Charts ==
=== Weekly charts ===
Chart (2011)	Peak position
Australian Music DVD (ARIA)	3
Belgian Music DVD (Ultratop Flanders)	6
Belgian Music DVD (Ultratop Wallonia)	9
Dutch Music DVD (MegaCharts)	1
French Music DVD (SNEP)	8
German Music DVD (GfK Entertainment Charts)	10
Greek Albums (IFPI)	54
Hungarian Music DVD (MAHASZ)	13
Irish Music DVD (IRMA)	8
Italian Music DVD (FIMI)	2
Japanese Music DVD (Oricon)	62
Portuguese Music DVD (AFP)	9
Spanish Music DVD (PROMUSICAE)	4
Swedish Music DVD (Sverigetopplistan)	8
Swiss Music DVD (Schweizer Hitparade)	8
UK Music Video (OCC)	8
US Music Video (Billboard)	2

=== Year-end charts ===
Chart (2011)	Position
Australian Music DVD (ARIA)	29
Belgian Music DVD (Ultratop Wallonia)	26
Brazilian Music DVD (PMB)	15
Dutch Music DVD (MegaCharts)	23

Chart (2012)	Position
Belgian Music DVD (Ultratop Wallonia)	37
Dutch Music DVD (MegaCharts)	11
French Music DVD (SNEP)	48
US Music Videos (Billboard)	3

Chart (2013)	Position
US Music Videos (Billboard)	26

== Certifications ==
Region	Certification	Certified units/sales
Australia (ARIA)	Platinum	15,000^{^}
France (SNEP)	Gold	7,500^{*}
Poland (ZPAV)	Gold	5,000^{*}
United States (RIAA) (Deluxe)	Platinum	100,000^{^}
United States (RIAA) (Standard)	Gold	50,000^{^}
^{*} Sales figures based on certification alone.^{^} Shipments figures based on certification alone.

== Release history ==
List of release dates, showing region, edition(s), format(s), label(s) and reference(s)
Region	Date	Edition(s)	Format(s)	Label(s)	Ref.
United States	November 21, 2011	Standard	DVD (Walmart exclusive)	Parkwood; Columbia	
Belgium	November 24, 2011	Deluxe	DVD	Sony Music	
Netherlands	November 24, 2011	Deluxe	DVD	Sony Music	
France	November 28, 2011	Standard; deluxe	DVD	Sony Music	
Canada	November 29, 2011	Deluxe	DVD	Sony Music	
United States	November 29, 2011	Deluxe	DVD	Parkwood; Columbia	
Australia	December 2, 2011	Deluxe	DVD	Sony Music	
Germany	December 2, 2011	Standard; deluxe	DVD	Sony Music	
Poland	December 5, 2011	Standard; deluxe	DVD	Sony Music	
United Kingdom	December 5, 2011	Deluxe	DVD	RCA	
Philippines	December 10, 2011	Deluxe	DVD	Sony Music	
Japan	December 21, 2011	Deluxe	DVD	Sony Music	
