= Start Over (Beyoncé song) =

Song by Beyoncé

from the album 4
- Recorded: 2011
- Studio: MSR, New York City; Jungle City, New York City
- Genre: Pop • R&B
- Length: 3:19
- Label: Columbia
- Songwriters: Shea Taylor; Beyoncé Knowles; Ester Dean
- Producers: Taylor; Knowles

"Start Over" is a song recorded by the American singer Beyoncé from her fourth studio album, 4 (2011). It was written by Shea Taylor, Beyoncé Knowles and Ester Dean and produced by Taylor and Knowles. The song's development was motivated by the fact that Knowles traveled around the world and experienced different cultures which inspired love and purity inside her. A mid-tempo pop, pop rock and soul-influenced R&B ballad, "Start Over" finds the female protagonist affirming her individuality and expressing her love for a man with whom she attempts to start a relationship all over again. Knowles' vocals are accompanied by electric and enticing beats; the song's instrumentation includes drums and synthesizers.

"Start Over" received mixed to positive reviews from music critics, who noted that the song was quite similar to Knowles' older material. The placement of the song on the track-listing was criticized by critics, who thought that it made "Start Over" barely distinguishable. However, the beats arrangement and the vulnerability of Knowles' vocals were highlighted by many critics. Following the release of 4, "Start Over" charted at number 43 on the South Korea Gaon International Chart based on downloads alone.

== Conception ==
"Start Over" was written by Shea Taylor, Knowles and Ester Dean and produced by the Knowles and Taylor. It was recorded at MSR Studios and Jungle City Studios in New York City. "Start Over" was mixed by Serban Ghenea with further assistance from Phil Seaford and it was engineered by John Hanes with further assistance from Ramon Rivas and Pete Wolford. Beginning on June 16 to June 27, 2011, the songs from 4 were available to listen to in full each day on Knowles' official website, paired with its accompanying photo spread from the album packaging and an insightful quote. On June 22, 2011, "Start Over" was the fourth song to be chosen. The quote found Knowles elaborating on what motivated her to record a song like "Start Over": "For the first time in my life I was able to travel the world, hear different influences, see different types of dance and choreography and taste different types of food. It was important that I was able to digest everything: It inspired purity, more heart and more love."

== Composition ==
=== Music and lyrical content ===
"Start Over"
A 20-second sample of "Start Over", featuring Knowles singing over synthesizers, a piano and electric as well as enticing beats, which according to Joanne Dorken of MTV UK, gives the song a "futuristic feel". Adopting heartfelt emotion as well as raspy and husky growls, Knowles delivers the highest musical notes while singing "Let’s start over" as the pounding drum beats continue to catch up, finally reaching their peak in the chorus.

"Start Over" is a midtempo R&B ballad, which contains elements of pop, soul and "angst-ridden" pop rock and is built on hollow electric beats. The song's instrumentation consists of gleaming synthesizers, a piano, loud and echoing drums, and minimal percussion instrument. According to Amanda Hensel of Pop Crush, the arrangement of the synthesizers is reminiscent of the Destiny's Child era. Jenna Hally Rubenstein of MTV Buzzworthy compared the song with Knowles' own "1+1" (2011) from the same album. Andrew Unterberger of the website Popdust compared the song with Ryan Tedder-produced songs like Jordin Sparks' "Battlefield" and Kelly Clarkson's "Already Gone". Priya Elan of NME felt that the piano parts in "Start Over" were similar to songs by rock band Evanescence because of its processed drums and piano riffing.

"Start Over" finds Knowles affirming her individuality and expressing her love for a man with whom she attempts to start a relationship all over again rather than losing it. Jon Caramanica of The New York Times added that Knowles' emotional radar "is set to loyalty, for better or worse — sometimes that loyalty is rewarded, and sometimes it has been betrayed, but over all, she operates on the axis of faithfulness". Her vocals throughout the song are "so vulnerable that they're almost tortured" as stated by Rubenstein. Lewis Corner of Digital Spy further noted that the "raspy and husky growls" that Knowles adopts occasionally on "Start Over", show an "offering moments of raw, heartfelt emotion".

=== Song structure ===
The song begins with Knowles singing: "I feel weak / We've been here before / 'Cause I feel we keep going back and forth / Maybe it's over, maybe we're through / But I honestly can say I still love you." The introduction is skeletal as it contains only atmospheric synthesizers and insistent drum tapping, which have been further described as "warbly [and] lighthearted". Throughout the song, the swaths of reverb occasionally pierce through the production. In the pre-chorus lines, Knowles sings: "Maybe it's over, maybe we're through, but I honestly can say I still love you / Maybe we reached a mountain peak and there’s no more left to climb / and maybe we lost a magic piece and we're too blind to find" while her vocals are followed by background sounds. The beat steadily grows from the verses to the bridge and, finally, to the chorus, with pounding drums coming into the loop during the refrain as Knowles sings: "Let’s start over / Let's give love their wings / Let’s start over / Stop fighting bout the same old thing". As she belts the high notes and the drum beats continue to catch up, she urges her man to "give love another life". During the bridge, Knowles sings: "I know I called you selfish / But that’s a lie", over a simple piano line.

== Critical reception ==
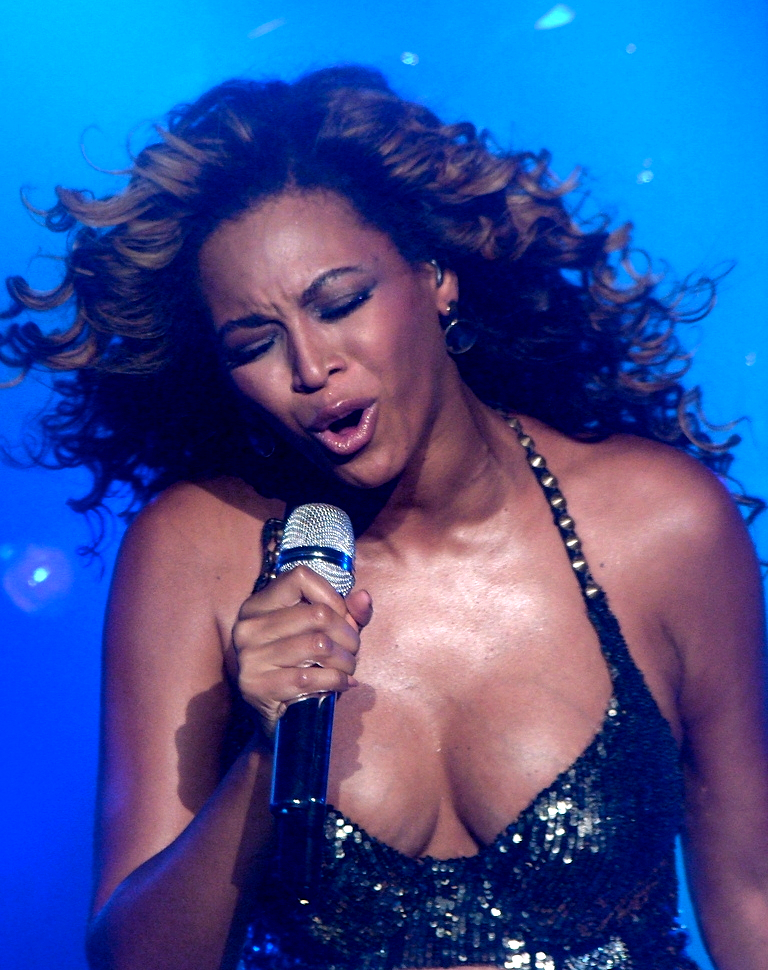
Knowles performing during her 4 Intimate Nights with Beyoncé revue

"Start Over" earned mixed to positive reviews from critics, some of whom felt it was too similar to Knowles's older material. MTV's Jenna Hally Rubenstein wrote that in the song, Knowles shows her best side, which according to her were the "larger-than-life, emotionally tortured, breathy ballads." Writing for MTV UK, Joanne Dorken concluded that the song was "stonking and dramatic" but also "single-worthy." Dorken added: "Knowles shows off that big voice of hers, leaving us wanting more from the lady herself." While reviewing 4, Gary Graff of Billboard magazine noted that several songs on the album, including "Start Over", were talking about "the gray areas in between". Erika Ramirez of the same magazine said: "Again honest when it comes to love, Bey[oncé]' won't surrender till she and beau 'give love another life.' Bey[oncé]'s roar matches the song's fight." Ben Cardew of Music Week stated that "Start Over" was the first indication that Knowles might have picked "some leftfield influences during those nine months off", making reference to the way the song starts, as he wrote, "with what sounds like – but most probably isn't – distorted pan pipes before kicking into a massive R&B number."

Robert Copsey of the website Digital Spy found similarities between the song and Knowles' older material. Chad Grischow of IGN commented that the chiming blend of synth and piano over a hollow beat on "Start Over" showcase the vulnerability in Knowles' vocals effectively. Amanda Hensel of the website Pop Crush graded the song with three out of five stars and called it one of the "begging and pleading love songs, but it also has that element of 'Yeah, it's probably time to call this off.'" She added that: "This feels like more of a filler track than a chart-topping single, and because she's the best of the best, it's easy for her to knock out a killer song without really trying." Hensel finished her review by saying "'Start Over' is good, but it's not amazing, and we know she can do better." Cristin Maher of the same publication in his review of 4 wrote:

"Although it is easy for some to get sick of the repetitive lovesick theme B seems to gravitate towards, the music in this song nothing short of epic, as is Beyonce's vocal performance. The beat steadily grows from the verses to the bridge and, finally, to the chorus, with pounding drums coming in to the loop during the refrain as B[eyoncé] sings, 'Let's start over / Let's give love their wings / Let's start over / Stop fighting bout the same old thing.'"

A mixed review was given by Andy Gill of The Independent who said that "the vocal editing on 'Start Over' is far too sloppy, confirming again that a series of individual flourishes doesn't pass muster as a performance." David Amidon of PopMatters also gave a mixed review for "Start Over" and "Countdown" saying that they "just don't seem to be listening to themselves, and will get by on listenability more than lyrical wizardry if they get by at all." Matthew Perpetua of Rolling Stone also gave a mixed review for the song, saying: "While the other songs on 4 all have a distinct flavor and give Beyoncé an opportunity to try something new in some way or another, 'Start Over' just kind of sits there at the middle of the disc not doing much of anything." He also noted that "Start Over" was an "inoffensive ballad that doesn't do much for the record aside from break its momentum at the halfway point."

NME's Hamish MacBain classified the song as one of the "barely distinguishable slowies" and added that the "will to continue listening [the album] departs." Andrew Unterberger of the website Popdust gave a negative review for "Start Over" grading it with two out of five stars. Comparing it with Knowles' older material, Unterberger concluded: "Beyoncé tries her best to imbue them with legitimate emotion, especially on the chorus, but it's just not happening this time around." Ricky Schweitzer of the website Beats Per Minute concluded that songs like "I Miss You" and "Start Over" would earn deserved spots in "the Beyoncé pantheon" once fans take the time to grow attached to them. Elan Priya of NME wrote that the song was a "trouble-in-paradise tune" with an "overblown chorus with hair-rock aspirations". However, he commented that the song was "rather buried under sonic bluster".

== Promotion ==
Although set to showcase Knowles' fourth album 4, "Start Over" was noticeably missing from her set list for the 4 Intimate Nights with Beyoncé revue. Elementary school chorus PS22 chorus covered the song in March 2012. Their cover appeared on Knowles' official website. A remix of the song from Polish house band WAWA premiered online on July 8, 2013.

== Credits and personnel ==
Credits adapted from 4 liner notes.

- Ester Dean – songwriter
- Serban Ghenea – mixer
- John Hanes – engineer mixer
- Beyoncé Knowles – vocals, songwriter, producer
- Ramon Rivas – assistant engineer
- Phil Seaford – assistant mixer
- Shea Taylor – songwriter, producer
- Jordan "DJ Swivel" Young – engineer
- Pete Wolford – assistant engineer

== Chart performance ==
For the week ending July 2, 2011, "Start Over" debuted at number 43 on the South Korean International Singles Chart, selling 14,192 digital downloads.

Chart (2011)	Peak position
South Korea Gaon International Chart	43
