= 4 (Beyoncé album) =

2011 studio album by Beyoncé

- Standard edition cover

Studio album by Beyoncé
- Released: June 24, 2011
- Recorded: March 2010 – May 2011
- Studios: Jungle City; KMA; MSR; Roc the Mic (New York); Triangle Sound (Atlanta); Strong Mountain (Stone Mountain, Georgia); Conway Recording; Enormous; Record Plant (Los Angeles); Studio at the Palms (Las Vegas); Avex (Honolulu); Real World (Wiltshire); Germano Studios The Hit Factory (New York City)
- Genre: R&B
- Length: 46:28
- Labels: Parkwood; Columbia
- Producers: Beyoncé Knowles; Antonio Dixon; Babyface; Brent Kutzle; Jeff Bhasker; Kanye West; Kaskade; Ryan Tedder; Shea Taylor; Skyz Muzik; Switch; Symbolyc One; The-Dream; Tricky Stewart

Beyoncé chronology
Heat (2011)	4 (2011)	4: The Remix (2012)

Singles from 4
- 1. "Run the World (Girls)" Released: April 21, 2011; 2. "Best Thing I Never Had" Released: June 1, 2011; 3. "Party" Released: August 30, 2011; 4. "Love On Top" Released: September 12, 2011; 5. "Countdown" Released: October 4, 2011; 6. "I Care" Released: March 23, 2012; 7. "End of Time" Released: April 23, 2012

4 is the fourth studio album by the American singer and songwriter Beyoncé. It was released on June 24, 2011, by Parkwood Entertainment and Columbia Records. Recorded from March 2010 to May 2011, the album was produced by Beyoncé alongside Babyface, Jeff Bhasker, Kanye West, Kaskade, Brent Kutzle, and Ryan Tedder of OneRepublic, Switch, and The-Dream, among others. The album features a single lead guest appearance, from André 3000 of Outkast. Following a career hiatus that reignited her creativity, Beyoncé conceived 4 as a record rooted in traditional rhythm and blues that stood apart from contemporary popular music.

4 was Beyoncé's first album after she ended her working relationship with her father and manager Mathew Knowles. She conceived 4 as an intimate album that departed from the commercially oriented music of her past releases. Her collaborations with songwriters and record producers The-Dream, Tricky Stewart, and Shea Taylor resulted in a more subdued tone that incorporates vocal styles and influences from 1970s and 1980s funk, hip-hop, and soul music. The lyrics address monogamy, female empowerment, and self-reflection, reflecting Beyoncé's effort to convey a more mature message and assert artistic credibility.

Beyoncé promoted 4 in mid-2011 through television and festival performances, including a headlining set at the Glastonbury Festival. The album received generally positive reviews by music critics; several publications included it on their year-end lists. In the United States, it became Beyoncé's first album to spend multiple weeks atop the Billboard 200 and has been certified quadruple platinum. The album also peaked at number one in Argentina, Croatia, Ireland, Spain, South Korea, Switzerland, and the United Kingdom. Five of its singles reached the Billboard Hot 100: "Run the World (Girls)", "Best Thing I Never Had", "Party", "Love On Top", and "Countdown". At the 55th Annual Grammy Awards (2013), "Love On Top" won Best Traditional R&B Performance.

== Background and development ==
Following the release of her third album I Am... Sasha Fierce (2008) and the ensuing world tour, Beyoncé took a career hiatus in 2010 "to live life [and] to be inspired by things again". During her hiatus, she "killed" Sasha Fierce, the aggressive stage alter-ego used in I Am... Sasha Fierce, as she felt she could now merge her two personalities. She severed professional ties with her father and manager Mathew Knowles, who had guided her career since the 1990s with Destiny's Child, noting that the decision made her feel vulnerable.

It was a time where [sic] everyone was doing pop/dance music, and R&B and soul were getting lost. It was popular and fun, but it wasn’t my thing. It was not where I was going with my music career at that time. I was yearning for something deeper with more musicality. That’s when I put out "1+1" and "Love On Top."

— Beyoncé reflecting on 4 for GQ in 2024

In an interview for Complex, Beyoncé expressed dissatisfaction with contemporary radio. She intended 4 to help change that status, commenting, "Figuring out a way to get R&B back on the radio is challenging ... With 4, I tried to mix R&B from the '70s and the '90s with rock 'n' roll and a lot of horns to create something new and exciting. I wanted musical changes, bridges, vibrata, live instrumentation and classic songwriting." On her website she wrote, "The album is definitely an evolution. It's bolder than the music on my previous albums because I'm bolder. The more mature I become and the more life experiences I have, the more I have to talk about. I really focused on songs being classics, songs that would last, songs that I could sing when I'm 40 and when I'm 60." Beyoncé also sought to make more artistic music, rather than purely commercially oriented songs.

"End of Time"
"End of Time" uses horns and percussion inspired by late Nigerian musician Fela Kuti.

Although much of 4's inspiration came from "touring, traveling, watching rock bands and attending festivals", the album's early musical direction was influenced by Nigerian Afrobeat musician Fela Kuti, whose passion for music motivated Beyoncé. She worked with the band from Fela!, the Broadway musical based on Kuti's life. DJ Swivel, one of 4's engineers, later described how Kuti's use of percussion and horns influenced the track "End of Time". In 2015, The-Dream revealed that he and Beyoncé had composed a whole album based on Kuti's music, although it was scrapped in favor of creating 4, explaining how "End of Time" became so heavily influenced.

She also found additional influences in Earth, Wind & Fire, The Stylistics, Lauryn Hill, Stevie Wonder, and Michael Jackson. She used hip-hop for a "broader sound" and looked to bring soul singing back, stating, "I used a lot of the brassiness and grittiness in my voice that people hear in my live performances, but not necessarily on my records."

== Recording and production ==
I said I'm going to take a risk and I'm going to bring R&B music back and I'm going to add bridges to songs and chord changes. I'm going to sing about love and do the opposite of what I thought I was going to do. I'm not going to try to be cool, forget being cool, I'm going to be honest, I'm going to be sad, I'm going to be passionate, I'm going to be vulnerable, I'm going to sing from my heart.

— Beyoncé, Life Is But a Dream, 2013

Three months into her hiatus, in March 2010, Beyoncé began recording at her husband Jay-Z's Roc the Mic Studios in New York City. One song—"Party"—was recorded because she wanted to see what working relationship would develop with engineer DJ Swivel. Kanye West assisted the production of "Party" after Beyoncé was impressed by his work on My Beautiful Dark Twisted Fantasy (2010). André 3000, the only featured artist on 4, contributed a rap verse to the song, which he recorded in Georgia.

Six weeks later, in May 2010, she asked Swivel to work on the entire project. Concerning his working relationship with Beyoncé, he commented, "There was no 'We're doing this today.' It was a very kind of open project, where whatever she felt like recording at that time was what we'd work on. It was based on how she felt, her mood, and also her listening to the demos that writers would give us." With Swivel, she experimented with horns, drums, guitars and percussion instruments. Mostly inspired by the Fela! sessions, Swivel began to formulate beats using their own recordings and those from Fela! The project was moved to KMA Studios for a week and a half because Roc the Mic was not large enough. There, they began recording "I Care", "Best Thing I Never Had" and "Rather Die Young", and completed "Party". They recorded the songs "Schoolin' Life", "1+1" and "Start Over" at Jungle City Studios in New York.

MSR Studios was the final New York City-based studio used, and where most of 4 was recorded—only "Party" and "I Was Here" were recorded entirely at other studios. At MSR, Beyoncé emphasized the use of live instruments on songs such as "I Care" and "End of Time". Consequently, most of the instruments, including drums, keyboards, guitar and bass work, were recorded there and were performed by Jeff Bhasker and Shea Taylor. Beyoncé asked Frank Ocean to write and record "I Miss You" at MSR, saying to Complex, "[Jay-Z] had a CD playing in the car one Sunday when we were driving to Brooklyn. I noticed his tone, his arrangements, and his storytelling. I immediately reached out to him—literally the next morning. I asked him to fly to New York and work on my record."

After listening to each song, Beyoncé often requested the addition of specific instruments, leaving her production team to make the sounds cohesive. Her vocals were recorded through an Avalon Design 737 preamp and compressed in a 1176 Peak Limiter with a 4:1 ratio. After recording the lead vocals for a track, Swivel cut them in different ways and he and Beyoncé picked the best, before recording the backing vocals. Beyoncé composed her own vocal arrangements and harmonies for each song. Her microphones were carefully placed to achieve a blend of sounds with a clear quality. Swivel spoke of her work ethic in an interview for Sound on Sound:

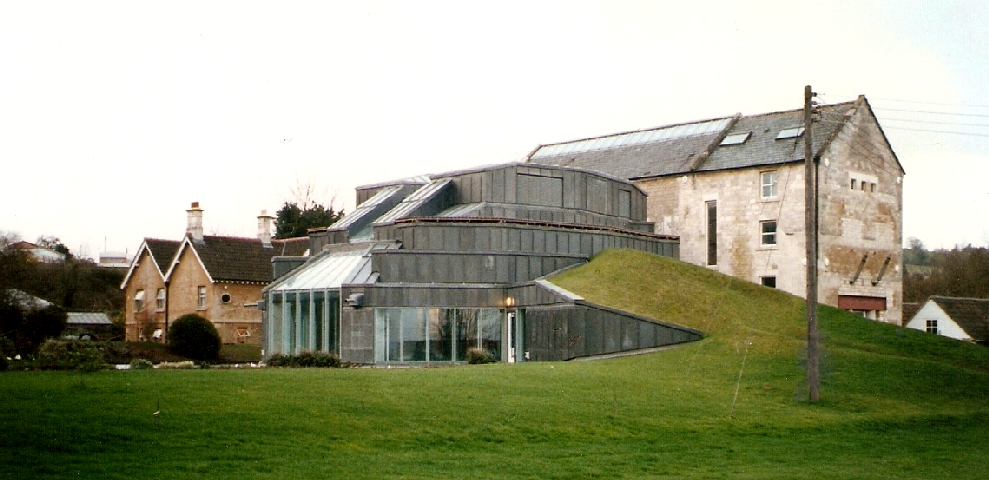
Beyoncé recorded at various locations, including Peter Gabriel's Real World Studios in Wiltshire, England.

She's so fast and good at what she does that you can't afford to waste time on anything, so if we're ready to record drums, for example, we're going to work with whatever we have available right there and then. That's why we worked in such great studios, because we know they have great gear, and we don't need to worry about renting gear. Part of my job as an engineer is to make sure the sessions are not only moving along, but moving along at her pace.

After the move to MSR, Beyoncé and her production team began traveling internationally. In the United Kingdom, they worked at Peter Gabriel's Real World Studios in Wiltshire—particularly using Gabriel's multi-instrument room—to create "Love On Top". Soon after, Beyoncé joined Jay-Z in a Sydney mansion, as he was working on his collaboration album Watch the Throne (2011) with Kanye West. There they created a "primitive studio" using a microphone, an outboard rig, and Pro Tools software to record. Sessions were also held in Las Vegas, Los Angeles, Atlanta and Honolulu.

In February 2011, MTV reported the project was nearing completion. 4 was mixed mostly at MixStar Studios in Virginia and mastered at Sterling Sound in New York City. The audio mastering was delayed by a week following the unexpected recording of "I Was Here". Diane Warren had played the song to Jay-Z during a telephone conversation, leading him to put Warren and Beyoncé in contact. In May 2011, Beyoncé submitted seventy-two songs in preparation for the album's release. According to Swivel, an eclectic range of songs were recorded, including ballads, "weird ethereal things" and 1990s R&B and Afrobeat-inspired songs.

== Music and lyrics ==
The final version of 4 comprises twelve tracks on the standard edition and eighteen on the deluxe edition—three of which are remixes of "Run the World (Girls)". Critics viewed 4 as a major departure from Beyoncé's previous catalog, with a distinctive more subdued sound. The album consists mostly of mid-tempo R&B songs, with 1970s funk, 1980s pop and 1990s soul influences. The second half is more eclectic, exploring a variety of genres including hard rock, reggae and adult contemporary. The Guardian wrote that the album's divergence from the "layering [of] Euro-synths on pop-step woomphs" set it apart from the music of Beyoncé's contemporaries.

The balladry of the first half of 4 combines diverse vocal styles with the use of live instrumentation. "1+1" demonstrates Beyoncé's vocal-flexing over "magnificent guitar bombast" and a soft backing beat, while "Start Over", a mid-tempo R&B ballad, uses a futuristic rhythm with electric elements and synthesizers. "I Miss You", with its "layers of atmospheric keyboards", ambient synthesizers and tinny 808 drums was sung in a half-whisper to convey intense emotion. "I Was Here", an understated pop-R&B ballad with indie rock inflections, primarily concerns self-reflection and features dramatic vocals.

On other songs, Beyoncé explores womanhood. "Best Thing I Never Had", 4's fourth track, has been described as a moment of self-realization and a "female call to arms". With vocals that allude to a "wounded bird turned resilient lioness", the song is built on a "winkly piano riff and beefy bass drums". "Dance for You" conveys a more sexual tone through breathy vocals and blaring electric guitars. It forgoes Beyoncé's typical empowerment themes in favor of sensual imagery and comfort with one's partner. "Run the World (Girls)", a female empowerment anthem reminiscent of Beyoncé's more contemporary work on I Am... Sasha Fierce, uses an energetic sample of Major Lazer's "Pon de Floor". The song incorporates "layered melodics", most prominently a military marching drumbeat, while Beyoncé's near-chanted delivery encompasses her full vocal range.

"Countdown"
Beyoncé viewed "Countdown" as one of her most experimental songs. Using a variety of genres, including dancehall, it features a brass arrangement. Beyoncé sings the chorus—a countdown from the number ten—with a sample of Boyz II Men's "Uhh Ahh".

The tracks "Countdown" and "End of Time" were distinguished by their musical and lyrical experimentalism. "Countdown" was described as "everywhere on the genre map", although predominantly dancehall-led with a "bristling brass arrangement". Its chorus describes a relationship by counting backwards from ten, using a sample from Boyz II Men's "Uhh Ahh". "End of Time"'s pulsating, brass sound—reminiscent of a marching-band—was heavily influenced by Afrobeat musician Fela Kuti. Kuti's use of horns and percussion instruments was recreated and combined with elements of electronic music and synthesizers. "Lay Up Under Me" is also built on retro horns, featuring upbeat vocals, a sound Ryan Dombal of Pitchfork associated with Michael Jackson's 1979 album Off the Wall.

Other tracks were noted for their retro stylization. "Rather Die Young" is a throwback to 1960s doo-wop and Philadelphia soul, with a slow tempo and modern drums. "Party" achieves a vintage aesthetic through minimalistic production, replete with heavy synthesizers and a 1980s smooth-funk groove. The song is unique for its conversation-like structure, in which Beyoncé and guest-vocalist André 3000 sing verses that allude to socialization at parties. Elements of Prince's style were identified on "Schoolin' Life" and "1+1". "Schoolin' Life" is an uptempo funk song, with lyrics that advise the listener to live life to the fullest while cautioning them about the consequences of excess. The chorus of "1+1" was compared to "Purple Rain", with themes of sadness and resentment; the song uses soft background vocals and dense percussion. "Love On Top" was noted for its energetic key changes with a joyful tone, evoking the work of Michael and Janet Jackson. Its retro sound is marked by a melding of horns as well as sweet backing harmonies that are most prominent on its bridge and chorus.

== Release and promotion ==
In an interview for Billboard, Beyoncé stated that despite having another concept for the album, she was ultimately influenced by her fans to name the album 4. She described the number four as "special" to her because her birthday, Jay-Z's birthday, several other family and friends' birthdays, and her wedding anniversary fall on the fourth day of their respective months. The cover of the standard edition was revealed on Beyoncé's website on May 18, 2011. Shot on the rooftop of the Hôtel Meurice in Paris, Beyoncé is looking into the distance with her arms raised over her head, wearing smokey eye makeup, thick gold cuffs and a fox-fur stole by cult French designer Alexandre Vauthier, embellished with Swarovski crystals by the Lesage embroidery house. The cover of the deluxe edition was shown on June 16, in which Beyoncé is dressed in a tight-fitting blue-purple dress by French designer Maxime Simoens, holding her hands in her hair. For its artwork, she opted for clothing made by lesser-known designers. The promotional and interior-package images for 4 were shot at the same time.

On May 18, 2011, 4's United States release date was confirmed as June 28. On June 7, the album was leaked online in full; Beyoncé's legal representatives issued warnings to infringing websites and leaked tracks were soon removed from such sites. On June 9, Beyoncé responded to the leak through Facebook, commenting, "My music was leaked and while this is not how I wanted to present my new songs, I appreciate the positive response from my fans. When I record music I always think about my fans singing every note and dancing to every beat. I make music to make people happy and I appreciate that everyone has been so anxious to hear my new songs." Following this, reports circulated that Columbia Records executives hoped to protect their investment amid fears that the album might be a commercial failure. Rumors suggested that the label asked Beyoncé to make changes to the record and reunite Destiny's Child, claims Columbia denied. In August 2013, NME reported that Sony Music was suing a 47-year-old man from Gothenburg for US$233,000 concerning the leak of 4. A deluxe version of the album was released simultaneously with the standard edition in several countries; in the United States, it was available exclusively through Target stores.

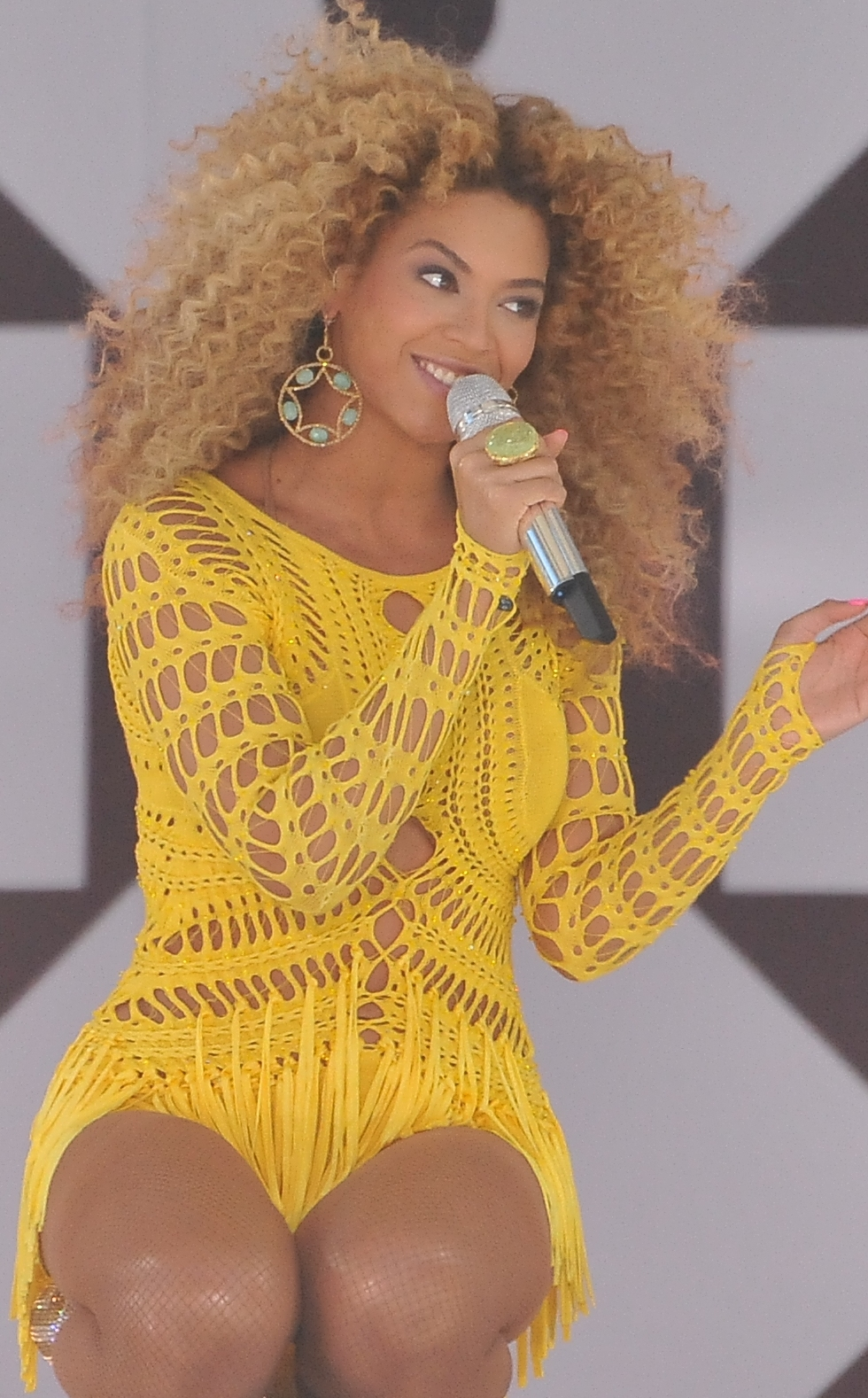
Beyoncé performing as part of Good Morning America's "Summer Concert Series" on July 1, 2011

Beyoncé made several appearances on television and in live shows to promote 4. She performed "Run the World (Girls)" for the first time on May 17, 2011, on Surprise Oprah! A Farewell Spectacular at the United Center in Chicago. She also performed the song at the 2011 Billboard Music Awards. On May 25, "1+1" was made available for download through the iTunes Store in the United States. The same day, "1+1" was performed at the American Idol final; she introduced it as her favorite song. In June, she performed at the Palais Nikaïa in Nice, Zénith de Lille, and the Galaxie in Amnéville. On June 26, Beyoncé was the closing act at the Glastonbury Festival 2011 in the United Kingdom. She was the first solo female artist to headline the Pyramid stage at the Glastonbury Festival in more than twenty years. A pre-taped performance of "Best Thing I Never Had" and "End of Time" at the Glastonbury Festival was broadcast during the 2011 BET Awards. The following day, Beyoncé's exclusive hour-long interview with Piers Morgan in London was broadcast on Piers Morgan Tonight. She also appeared on the finale of France's X Factor to perform "Run the World" and "Best Thing I Never Had". An MTV television special, Beyoncé: Year of 4, premiered on June 30, documenting Beyoncé's life during 4's production.

On July 1, Beyoncé appeared on Good Morning America as part of its "Summer Concert Series" in New York City. She also projected images from 4 on a number of London's landmarks, including Madame Tussauds and Battersea Power Station. She then traveled to Scotland to perform at the T in the Park Festival on July 9, 2011. The next day, she performed at the Oxegen Festival in Ireland. On July 28, 2011, Beyoncé performed "1+1" and "Best Thing I Never Had" on The View; the latter was also performed on Late Night with Jimmy Fallon the same day. From August 16–19, Beyoncé held the 4 Intimate Nights with Beyoncé concerts at the Roseland Ballroom to a standing-room-only audience. Subsequently, the Live at Roseland: Elements of 4 DVD was released in November. "Love On Top" was sung at the 2011 MTV Video Music Awards on August 28, Beyoncé finished the performance by unbuttoning her blazer and rubbing her stomach to confirm her pregnancy. A live performance of "Countdown" recorded in July was broadcast on Late Night with Jimmy Fallon in November. Following the completion of her pregnancy, the album received additional promotion via the Revel Presents: Beyoncé Live residency in 2012, and songs from the album were prominently featured on The Mrs. Carter Show World Tour (2013–14).

4 was Beyoncé's first album that did not feature any single that reached number one or the top ten of the US Billboard Hot 100 chart. "Run the World (Girls)" was released internationally as the lead single from 4 on April 21, 2011. It reached number twenty-nine on the US Billboard Hot 100 chart and number eleven on the UK singles chart. "Best Thing I Never Had" followed on June 1, 2011. It reached number sixteen on the US Billboard Hot 100, number five on the New Zealand singles chart, and number three on the UK singles chart. "Party" was released as an urban contemporary single in the United States on August 30, 2011; a remix featuring J. Cole was released for download on October 24, 2011. "Love On Top" was released as a single, first in Australia in September 2011, and later in Italy, Belgium and the United States; It topped the US Billboard Hot R&B/Hip-Hop Songs for seven consecutive weeks. "Countdown" followed on October 4, 2011; "I Care" was released exclusively in Italy on March 23, 2012; and "End of Time" was released exclusively in the United Kingdom on April 23, 2012.

== Reception and legacy ==
Professional ratings
Aggregate scores
Source	Rating
AnyDecentMusic?	6.6/10
Metacritic	73/100
Review scores
Source	Rating
AllMusic	3/5 stars
The A.V. Club	B−
Entertainment Weekly	B
The Guardian	3/5 stars
Los Angeles Times	3/4 stars
NME	4/10
Pitchfork	8.0/10
Rolling Stone	3.5/5 stars
Spin	8/10
Uncut	4/5 stars

4 received positive reviews from music critics. At Metacritic, which assigns a weighted mean rating out of 100 to reviews from mainstream critics, the album received an average score of 73, based on 36 reviews. Michael Cragg of The Observer called it Beyoncé's "most accomplished album yet". Slant Magazine's Eric Henderson believed 4 succeeds vocally as an album of mostly intimate and slow-tempo ballads. Mikael Wood of Spin magazine applauded its ballads, mid-tempo songs, and evocations of late 1970s and early 1980s pop-soul. In his review for Rolling Stone, Jody Rosen wrote that Beyoncé eschews contemporary production styles for a more personal and idiosyncratic album. Jon Caramanica of The New York Times viewed it as a good showcase for Beyoncé as a torch singer, because she convincingly sings about heartbreak and the strong emotional effect of love. Pitchfork's Ryan Dombal found it easygoing, retro-informed, and engaging because it shows "one of the world's biggest stars exploring her talent in ways few could've predicted". AllMusic's Andy Kellman said that the quality of Beyoncé's singing and the songwriting compensate for the assorted arrangement of the songs. Uncut viewed it is an exceptional album in spite of occasionally trite lyrics.

In a less enthusiastic review, Adam Markovitz of Entertainment Weekly said the first half of 4 is marred by boring ballads and the songwriting in general are not on-par with Beyoncé's vocal talent. In his review for The Guardian, Alexis Petridis was ambivalent toward the album's 1980s influence and argued that, despite well written songs, it is not very consequential. Time magazine's Claire Suddath said the songs lack lyrical substance, even though they are performed well. Greg Kot, writing in the Chicago Tribune, called 4 inconsistent, short, and unfinished. NME magazine's Hamish MacBain felt Beyoncé did not progress from her past work and that "even the OK bits here" sounded "uninspired". Tom Hull was more critical and gave the album a "C", lamenting the second half of songs' "overkill production" and believing the first half's ballads show that, while "every soul diva of her generation has dreamed of singing like Aretha Franklin ... only Beyoncé has had the ego to think she's done it."

=== Accolades ===
4 was included on various publication's year-end lists. It was ranked as the best album of the year by The New Yorker, and came in the runner-up spot on lists produced by Spin and Amazon. The album was ranked within the top ten by MSN, where it came in at number three, The Guardian and MTV, which placed it at number four, and the Chicago Sun-Times, which placed it at number six. The BBC ranked it at number seven, while The New York Times listed it as the 10th best album of the year. The album was placed at number 13 by Consequence of Sound, number 18 by Stereogum, number 25 by Rolling Stone, number 39 by Spin, number 10 by Club Fonograma, number 34 by Pretty Much Amazing, and number 27 by Pitchfork. 4 was included in NPR's Top 50 Favorite Albums of 2011, and was ranked at number 26 in the Pazz & Jop's critics poll.

Rob Sheffield ranked the album at number 37 on Rolling Stone's 2012 list "Women Who Rock: 50 Greatest Albums of All Time". On 2010s-decade-end lists, 4 was named the greatest R&B album by Rated R&B and the second-greatest pop album by Uproxx. Pitchfork ranked 4 at number 31 on their list of the 200 best albums of the 2010s decade, and BrooklynVegan placed it 29th on their ranking of the best R&B/rap albums of the same period. The album was included on Consequence of Sound's list "The 10 Best Summer Albums of All Time". In 2025, Paste named the project the 138th best album of the 21st century so far.

4 won R&B Album of the Year at the 2012 Billboard Music Awards. It received nominations at the 2011 American Music Awards, the 2011 Soul Train Music Awards, the 38th People's Choice Awards, the 43rd NAACP Image Awards and the 2012 Grammis. At the 55th Annual Grammy Awards, "Love On Top" won the Best Traditional R&B Performance Award.

== Commercial performance ==
4 peaked at number one on the albums charts of Ireland, Spain, Switzerland, and the United Kingdom, where it spent two weeks atop the UK Albums Chart. Across other markets, it peaked at number two in Australia, France, the Netherlands, and Poland; and number three in Canada and New Zealand. The album has been certified double platinum in Australia, Canada, and Sweden; triple platinum in Brazil, New Zealand, and the United Kingdom; and quadruple platinum in Denmark. As of November 2016, 4 had sold 5 million copies worldwide. In February 2018, 4 made Beyoncé the first female artist to have three albums each surpass one billion streams on Spotify.

In the United States, 4 debuted at number one on the Billboard 200, with first-week sales of 310,000 copies. This gave Beyoncé her fourth consecutive solo number-one debut. She became the second female artist, after Britney Spears, to have her first four studio albums debut atop the Billboard 200. According to Keith Caulfield of Billboard, 4 had a modest opening week compared to Beyoncé's previous albums because it was not released during the holiday season and its singles were less commercially successful. 4 became Beyoncé's first album to top the Billboard 200 albums chart for more than one week, spending two weeks at the number-one position. The album had sold 1.5 million copies in the United States by December 2015, and it was certified quadruple platinum by the Recording Industry Association of America (RIAA) in August 2022.

== Track listing ==
=== Original version ===
Standard edition
No.	Title	Writer(s)	Producer(s)	Length
1.	"1+1"	Beyoncé Knowles; Terius Nash; Christopher Stewart	Knowles; The-Dream; Tricky Stewart	4:33
2.	"I Care"	Knowles; Jeff Bhasker; Chad Hugo	Bhasker; Knowles^{[a]}	3:59
3.	"I Miss You"	Knowles; Frank Ocean; Shea Taylor	Knowles; S. Taylor	2:59
4.	"Best Thing I Never Had"	Knowles; Kenny "Babyface" Edmonds; Antonio Dixon; Patrick "J. Que" Smith; S. Taylor; Larry Griffin, Jr.; Caleb McCampbell	Knowles; Babyface; Dixon; Taylor; S1; McCampbell	4:13
5.	"Party" (featuring André 3000)	Knowles; Kanye West; Bhasker; Dexter Mills; Douglas Davis; Ricky Walters	Knowles; West; Bhasker^{[a]}	4:05
6.	"Rather Die Young"	Knowles; Bhasker; Luke Steele	Bhasker; Knowles^{[a]}; Steele^{[a]}	3:42
7.	"Start Over"	Knowles; S. Taylor; Ester Dean	Knowles; Taylor	3:19
8.	"Love On Top"	Knowles; Nash; S. Taylor	Knowles; Taylor	4:27
9.	"Countdown"	Knowles; Nash; S. Taylor; Dean; Cainon Lamb; Julie Frost; Michael Bivins; Nathan Morris; Wanya Morris	Knowles; Taylor	3:32
10.	"End of Time"	Knowles; Nash; S. Taylor; David Taylor	Knowles; The-Dream; Switch^{[b]}	3:43
11.	"I Was Here"	Diane Warren	Ryan Tedder; Brent Kutzle; Knowles^{[c]}; Kuk Harrell^{[c]}	3:59
12.	"Run the World (Girls)"	Knowles; Nash; Wesley Pentz; D. Taylor; Adidja Palmer; Nick van de Wall	Switch; The-Dream; Knowles^{[a]}; S. Taylor^{[a]}	3:56
Total length:				46:33

Japanese bonus track
No.	Title	Writer(s)	Producer(s)	Length
13.	"Dreaming"	Knowles; Edmonds; Dixon; Smith	Knowles; Babyface; Dixon	4:39
Total length:				51:12

Deluxe edition disc two
No.	Title	Writer(s)	Producer(s)	Length
1.	"Lay Up Under Me"	Knowles; Mikkel Eriksen; Tor Erik Hermansen; Sean Garrett; Taylor	Knowles; Taylor	4:13
2.	"Schoolin' Life"	Knowles; Nash; Carlos McKinney	The-Dream; Knowles^{[a]}; Los Da Mystro^{[a]}	4:52
3.	"Dance for You"	Knowles; Nash; Stewart	Knowles; The-Dream; Stewart	6:15
4.	"Run the World (Girls)" (Kaskade Club Remix)	Knowles; Nash; Pentz; D. Taylor; Palmer; van de Wall	Switch; The-Dream; Knowles^{[a]}; S. Taylor^{[a]}	5:02
5.	"Run the World (Girls)" (Redtop Club Remix)	Knowles; Nash; Pentz; D. Taylor; Palmer; van de Wall	Switch; The-Dream; Knowles^{[a]}; S. Taylor^{[a]}	6:02
6.	"Run the World (Girls)" (Jochen Simms Club Remix)	Knowles; Nash; Pentz; D. Taylor; Palmer; van de Wall	Switch; The-Dream; Knowles^{[a]}; S. Taylor^{[a]}	6:19
Total length:				37:26

=== Revised version ===
Expanded edition
No.	Title	Length
1.	"Love On Top"	4:27
2.	"Party" (featuring André 3000)	4:04
3.	"Schoolin' Life"	4:52
4.	"Countdown"	3:33
5.	"I Miss You"	2:58
6.	"Dance for You"	6:15
7.	"I Care"	3:59
8.	"Rather Die Young"	3:43
9.	"1+1"	4:34
10.	"End of Time"	3:44
11.	"Run the World (Girls)"	3:58
12.	"Best Thing I Never Had"	4:13
13.	"Start Over"	3:19
14.	"I Was Here"	3:58
Total length:		57:38

=== Notes ===
- ^{^[a]} signifies a co-producer
- ^{^[b]} signifies an additional producer
- ^{^[c]} signifies a vocal producer
- ^{^[d]}signifies a remixer
- "I Care" features background vocals by Billy Kraven
- "Party" features background vocals by Kanye West and Consequence
- "Rather Die Young" features background vocals by Luke Steele and Billy Kraven
- "I Was Here" features background vocals by Ryan Tedder
- CD deluxe edition contains an exclusive version of the music video for "Run the World (Girls)".

==== Sample credits ====
- "Party" contains a sample of "La Di Da Di" as performed by Doug E. Fresh and the Get Fresh Crew featuring MC Ricky D. and written by Douglas Davis and Ricky Walters.
- "Countdown" contains a sample of "Uhh Ahh" as performed by Boyz II Men and written by Michael Bivins, Nathan Morris and Wanya Morris.
- "End of Time" contains an uncredited sample of "BTSTU" as performed and written by Jai Paul.
- "Run the World (Girls)" contains a sample "Pon de Floor" as performed by Major Lazer and written by Afrojack, Vybz Kartel, Diplo and Switch.

== Personnel ==
Credits adapted from the liner notes of 4.

=== Performance credits ===
- Beyoncé – vocals, background vocals
- André 3000 – vocals, background vocals
- Luke Steele – background vocals
- Kanye West – background vocals
- Consequence – background vocals
- Ryan Tedder – background vocals
- Billy Kraven – background vocals

=== Visuals and imagery ===
- Tony Duran – photography
- Neal Farinah – glam team
- Greg Gex – photography
- Ty Hunter – fashion director
- Kimberly Kimble – glam team
- Lisa Logan – glam team
- Adam Larson – art director
- Melina Matsoukas – creative consultant
- Raquel Smith – stylist
- Jenke Ahmed Taily – creative director
- Francesca Tolot – glam team
- Ellen Von Unwerth – photography

=== Instruments ===
- Pete Wolford – guitar
- Nikki Glaspie – drums
- Lee Blaske – strings
- Drew Sayers – baritone, tenor
- Chad Hugo – rhythm guitar
- Kanye West – drums, keyboards, programming
- Jeff Bhasker – keyboard, guitar solo, keyboards and drum programming
- Rob Suchecki – guitar
- Cole Kamen-Green – trumpet
- Josiah Woodson – trumpet
- Nick Videen – tenor, alto saxophone
- Alex Asher – trombone
- Morgan Price – baritone saxophone, tenor
- Shea Taylor – alto saxophone, horns arrangement
- Luke Steele – guitar
- Robert "R.T." Taylor – guitar
- Pat Thrall – guitar
- Johnny Butler – tenor saxophone
- Jack Daley – bass guitar
- Ryan Tedder – drums, piano, additional programming
- Brent Kutzle – cello, guitar, additional programming
- Skyz Muzik – drums, piano, additional programming

=== Technical and production ===
- The-Dream – production
- Tricky Stewart – production
- Beyoncé – production, vocal production
- Jeff Bhasker – production
- Shea Taylor – production
- Babyface – production
- Antonio Dixon – production
- Symbolyc One – production
- Caleb McCampbell – production
- Kanye West – production
- Luke Steele – production
- Tom Coyne – mastering
- Switch – production
- Ryan Tedder – production
- Brent Kutzle – production
- Kuk Harrell – vocal production, vocal recording
- Diplo – production
- Carlos McKinney – production
- Kaskade – mix, additional production
- Jens Bergmark – mix production
- Julian Napolitano – mix production
- DJ Swivel – recording, vocal recording, mixing
- Mark Gray – engineering assistant
- Jason Sherwood – engineering assistant
- Steven Dennis – engineering assistant
- Pete Wolford – engineering assistant
- Scott Barnett – engineering assistant
- Tony Maserati – mixing
- Val Brathwaite – mixing assistant
- Ryan Kelly – engineering assistant
- Serge Nudel – mixing assistant, engineering assistant
- Gloria Kaba – engineering assistant
- Şerban Ghenea – mixing
- John Hanes – mixing engineer
- Phil Seaford – mixing assistant
- Gaylord Holomalia – engineering assistant
- Christian Mochizuki – engineering assistant
- Edwin Delahoz – engineering assistant
- Justin Hergett – engineering assistant
- Jon Castelli – engineering assistant
- Ramón Rivas – engineering assistant
- Chris Soper – engineering assistant
- Smith Carlson – engineering assistant
- Eric Aylands – engineering assistant
- Jon Sher – engineering assistant

== Charts ==
=== Weekly charts ===
Weekly chart performance for 4
Chart (2011–2012)	Peak position
Australian Albums (ARIA)	2
Australian Urban Albums (ARIA)	1
Austrian Albums (Ö3 Austria)	13
Belgian Albums (Ultratop Flanders)	4
Belgian Albums (Ultratop Wallonia)	4
Canadian Albums (Billboard)	3
Croatian International Albums (HDU)	2
Czech Albums (ČNS IFPI)	2
Danish Albums (Hitlisten)	5
Dutch Albums (Album Top 100)	2
Finnish Albums (Suomen virallinen lista)	24
French Albums (SNEP)	2
German Albums (Offizielle Top 100)	5
Greek Albums (IFPI)	5
Hungarian Albums (MAHASZ)	8
Irish Albums (IRMA)	1
Italian Albums (FIMI)	4
Japanese Albums (Oricon)	10
Mexican Albums (Top 100 Mexico)	31
New Zealand Albums (RMNZ)	3
Norwegian Albums (VG-lista)	4
Polish Albums (ZPAV)	2
Portuguese Albums (AFP)	3
Scottish Albums (Official Charts)	1
Slovenian Albums (IFPI)	6
South Korean Albums (Circle)	7
South Korean International Albums (Circle)	1
Spanish Albums (Promusicae)	1
Swedish Albums (Sverigetopplistan)	13
Swiss Albums (Romandie)	1
Swiss Albums (Schweizer Hitparade)	1
Taiwan International Albums (G-Music)	2
UK Albums (Official Charts)	1
UK R&B Albums (Official Charts)	1
US Billboard 200	1
US Top R&B/Hip-Hop Albums (Billboard)	1

=== Monthly charts ===
Monthly chart performance for 4
Chart (2011)	Peak position
Argentine Albums (CAPIF)	1

=== Year-end charts ===
2011 year-end chart performance for 4
Chart (2011)	Position
Australian Albums (ARIA)	26
Australian Hip-Hop/R&B Albums (ARIA)	3
Belgian Albums (Ultratop Flanders)	61
Belgian Albums (Ultratop Wallonia)	81
Brazilian Albums (ABPD)	11
Brazilian International Albums (ABPD)	2
Danish Albums (Hitlisten)	93
Dutch Albums (Album Top 100)	29
French Albums (SNEP)	77
French Digital Albums (SNEP)	40
Hungarian Albums (MAHASZ)	77
Hungarian Albums & Compilations (MAHASZ)	67
Italian Albums (FIMI)	99
New Zealand Albums (RMNZ)	41
Polish Albums (ZPAV)	36
Russian Albums (2M)	52
South Korean International Albums (Circle)	64
Swiss Albums (Schweizer Hitparade)	57
UK Albums (Official Charts)	18
UK R&B Albums (Official Charts)	4
US Billboard 200	21
US Top R&B/Hip-Hop Albums (Billboard)	7
Worldwide (IFPI)	12

2012 year-end chart performance for 4
Chart (2012)	Position
Australian Hip-Hop/R&B Albums (ARIA)	24
UK Albums (Official Charts)	79
US Billboard 200	91
US Top R&B/Hip-Hop Albums (Billboard)	13

2013 year-end chart performance for 4
Chart (2013)	Position
Australian Hip-Hop/R&B Albums (ARIA)	29
US Top R&B/Hip-Hop Albums (Billboard)	73

2014 year-end chart performance for 4
Chart (2014)	Position
Swedish Albums (Sverigetopplistan)	86

2015 year-end chart performance for 4
Chart (2015)	Position
Australian Hip-Hop/R&B Albums (ARIA)	89

2016 year-end chart performance for 4
Chart (2016)	Position
Swedish Albums (Sverigetopplistan)	79

2017 year-end chart performance for 4
Chart (2017)	Position
Australian Hip-Hop/R&B Albums (ARIA)	84

2018 year-end chart performance for 4
Chart (2018)	Position
Australian Hip-Hop/R&B Albums (ARIA)	84

2019 year-end chart performance for 4
Chart (2019)	Position
Australian Hip-Hop/R&B Albums (ARIA)	77

=== Decade-end charts ===
2010s-end chart performance for 4
Chart (2010–2019)	Position
UK Albums (Official Charts)	79
US Billboard 200	123

=== All-time charts ===
All-time chart performance for 4
Chart	Position
UK Female Albums (Official Charts) 21st century	95

== Certifications ==
Certifications for 4
Region	Certification	Certified units/sales
Australia (ARIA)	2× Platinum	140,000^{‡}
Brazil (Pro-Música Brasil)	3× Platinum	120,000^{‡}
Canada (Music Canada)	2× Platinum	160,000^{‡}
Denmark (IFPI Danmark)	Platinum	20,000^{‡}
France (SNEP)	Gold	50,000^{*}
Germany (BVMI)	Gold	100,000^{‡}
Ireland (IRMA)	Platinum	15,000^{^}
Italy (FIMI)	Gold	25,000^{*}
New Zealand (RMNZ)	3× Platinum	45,000^{‡}
Poland (ZPAV)	Platinum	20,000^{*}
Russia (NFPF)	Gold	5,000^{*}
Sweden (GLF)	2× Platinum	80,000^{‡}
United Kingdom (BPI)	3× Platinum	900,000^{‡}
United States (RIAA)	4× Platinum	4,000,000^{‡}
^{*} Sales figures based on certification alone.^{^} Shipments figures based on certification alone.^{‡} Sales+streaming figures based on certification alone.

== Release history ==
Release dates and formats for 4
Initial release date	Edition	Format(s)	Ref.
June 24, 2011	Standard	CD; digital download	
June 24, 2011	Deluxe	CD; digital download	
July 24, 2012	Expanded	CD; digital download	

== See also ==
- List of number-one albums of 2011 (Ireland)
- List of number-one albums of 2011 (Spain)
- List of number-one hits of 2011 (Switzerland)
- List of UK Albums Chart number ones of the 2010s
- List of UK R&B Albums Chart number ones of 2011
- List of Billboard 200 number-one albums of 2011
- List of Billboard number-one R&B albums of 2011
