= I Miss You (Beyoncé song) =

Song by Beyoncé

from the album 4
- Released: June 28, 2011
- Recorded: 2011
- Studio: MSR Studios (New York City)
- Genre: R&B
- Length: 2:59
- Label: Columbia
- Songwriters: Beyoncé Knowles; Frank Ocean; Shea Taylor
- Producers: Beyoncé Knowles; Shea Taylor

"I Miss You" is a song that was recorded by American singer Beyoncé for her fourth studio album, 4 (2011). It was written by Beyoncé, Frank Ocean and Shea Taylor, while production was handled by Beyoncé and Taylor. The song's development was motivated by the fact that Beyoncé wanted to focus on songs being classics, songs that would last, and songs that she could sing when she becomes old. A mid-paced R&B ballad, "I Miss You" is influenced by the ballads of the 1980s. Its instrumentation consists essentially of synthesizers and keyboards. "I Miss You" finds Beyoncé, as the protagonist, thinking deeply over her relationship with her love interest from whom she parted; however, she still pines for him and feels self-conscious for doing so.

"I Miss You" was generally praised by music critics who complimented its very sparse production as well as its aurally remarkable 1980s influence. Some of them also described the song as a "haunting" ballad and called it the highlight of the record. Critics also complimented how Beyoncé's vocals keep on alternating from desperate and calm throughout the song, and highlighted the vulnerability in her voice. Following the release of 4 in early July 2011, "I Miss You" charted at number 184 on the UK Singles Chart and at number 34 on the South Korea Gaon International Singles Chart, based on downloads alone. The song was part of Beyoncé's set list for her 4 Intimate Nights with Beyoncé residency, held in Roseland Ballroom, New York City in August 2011.

== Background and development ==
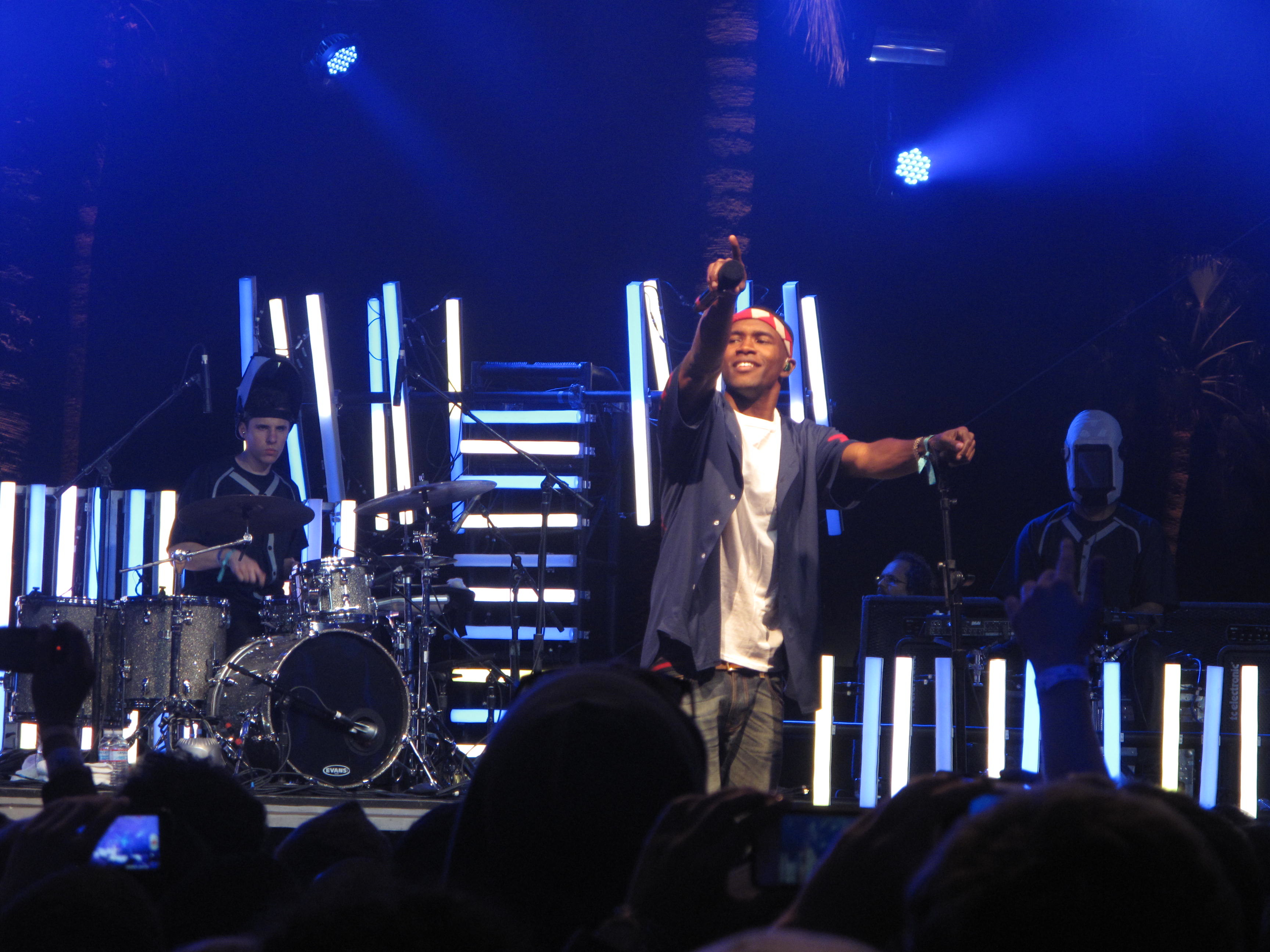
Frank Ocean (pictured) co-wrote "I Miss You".

"I Miss You" was written by Beyoncé, Odd Future collective member Frank Ocean, and Shea Taylor while production was handled by Beyoncé and Taylor themselves. In early March 2011, Ocean made known that Beyoncé was back in the studio working on her then upcoming fourth studio album, 4. Ocean posted a snap of Beyoncé in his studio on Twitter, fuelling reports that he had worked with Beyoncé on the new record. As well as posting a picture of Beyoncé recording new material, he also accompanied the image with the comment: "This is the room i am working in this day. not to brag but man, this is surreal. like [...] she is singing my songs. If time were to stop right now, the past couple weeks would be near the top of the highlight reel for my short time on earth [sic]."

In July 2011, Beyoncé sat for an interview with Gabriel Alvarez of Complex magazine, where she elaborated on how she came to know about Ocean: "Jay[-Z] had a CD playing in the car one Sunday when we were driving to Brooklyn. I noticed his tone, his arrangements, and his storytelling. I immediately reached out to him—literally the next morning. I asked him to fly to New York and work on my record." In this way, Ocean ended up co-writing "I Miss You". Beginning on June 16 to June 27, 2011, the songs from 4 were available to listen to in full each day on Beyoncé's official website, paired with its accompanying photo spread from the album packaging and an insightful quote. On June 18, 2011, "I Miss You"" was the third song to be chosen. The quote found Beyoncé elaborating on what motivated her to record a song like "I Miss You":

[4] is definitely an evolution. It is bolder than the music on my previous albums because I’m bolder. The more mature I become and the more life experiences I have, the more I have to talk about. I really focused on songs being classics, songs that would last, songs that I could sing when I’m 40 and when I’m 60.

== Composition ==
"I Miss You" is a ballad that draws from the genres of R&B and contains elements of pop music and trip hop. Michael Cragg, writing for both The Guardian and The Observer, noted that it is heavily influenced by the 1980s ballads. This was further noted by Charles Ubaghs of The Quietus and Priya Elan of NME, who commented that "I Miss You" is influenced by the 1980s electro soul and neo soul music styles respectively. A generally low-key song, "I Miss You" is built on a simple puttering metronomic beat, The song's instrumentation consists of "layers of atmospheric keyboards", ambient synthesizers, and tinny 808 drums The synthesizers expand and contract as they progress through their chords, maintaining an even level of intensity throughout.

"I Miss You"
An 18-second sample of part of the chorus lines of "I Miss You", demonstrating how Knowles' voice is doubled, with her regular tone voice singing softly over the ambient synthesizers, while her more prominent and higher pitched vocals are laid over it.

Additionally, Rich Juzwiak of The Village Voice commented that Martika's 1991 song "Love... Thy Will Be Done" is conjured in "I Miss You". Matthew Horton of BBC felt that "I Miss You" features "the kind of subtle tension" achieved by Alicia Keys' Try Sleeping with a Broken Heart (2010). Jim Farber of Daily News added that "'I Miss You' contrasts a soft bed of synth[esizers] and heavily echoed drums" in a way similar to Phil Collins' 1981 song "In the Air Tonight".

Described by Matthew Horton as a song that "tug[s] heartstrings", "I Miss You" finds Beyoncé, as the female protagonist, ruminating over her relationship with her ex-love interest without firm verdicts; she is "confused, conflicted, very human", as stated by the Chicago Sun-Times's Thomas Conner. Even though they have parted, Beyoncé "still cannot let go and her needs are vexing her", according to Melinda Newman of HitFix. Also, Matthew Perpetua of Rolling Stone added that the song features Beyoncé "at her most understated". Throughout the song, her phrasing is "cool, calm and collected". Ian Walker of AbsolutePunk stated that the lyrics of "I Miss You" are a mixture of "hopeful longing and loneliness."

In the chorus lines, Beyoncé questions herself, "I miss you / But if I got with you, could it feel the same?" From the second verse and onwards, the song finds Beyoncé "vocalizing an internal battle, alternately desperate and calm", as stated by Joey Guerra of the Houston Chronicle. She starts to sing in a double voice; her lower vocal notes are set as the song's base, while her voice in a heightened key is played over it. In the second verse, she sings, "The words don’t ever seem to come out right / But I still mean [th]em", pining for her ex-love interest and feeling self-conscious for doing so, "It hurts my pride to tell you how I feel, but I still need to" before asking again, "Why is that?".

== Critical reception ==
"I Miss You" received highly positive reviews. David Amidon of PopMatters who stated that "1+1 provides Beyoncé a song that "can compete with the favorites of this generation’s parents", came to the conclusion that "1+1" and "I Miss You" are "equally competent, if safer, attempts at the same formula". He concluded that these songs make it clear that Beyoncé is "head and shoulders above her Clear Channel competition in R&B". Joanne Dorken of MTV UK who described "I Miss You" as "heartfelt ballad" with her vocals being "on point", as she delivers the song with "raw emotion". Ben Cardew of Music Week appreciated "the influence of Frank Ocean", which according to him, made it feel like "the first track on the album to have a modern feel". He went on praising the fact that the ballad is constructed from "a stripped down beat and washes of synth, making a very simple track but one that benefits from its simplicity". Describing "I Miss You" as a "gently pulsing, sci-fi ballad", Joey Guerra of the Houston Chronicle called the song "one of the most fascinating moments amid a dozen tracks". Cameron Adams of the Herald Sun wrote that "I Miss You" is a nocturnal and experimental ballad due to its synth washes. Michael Cragg of The Observer called "the minimal 'I Miss You' the highlight [of 4]". Brandon Lewis of Blogcritics found "I Miss You" both "haunting and gorgeous, with an ominous vocal and very sparse production". Showing high favoritism for "I Miss You", Roberts Randall of Los Angeles Times wrote:

Beyoncé Knowles is not worried chasing fads, though she is well aware of them. Over the years, she has learned how to harness them so effortlessly that they seem like her ideas. Take the standout track on her new album, 4, 'I Miss You', a slow-burn jam of desire co-written by Odd Future-affiliated crooner Frank Ocean. In its beginning moments, the song draws on the sparse wave of recent music by British band The xx by using silence as a weapon, a notion that extends across the 12-song album.

Adam Markovitz of Entertainment Weekly was also positive, writing that Beyoncé "pants and sweats and grunts (except, you know, sexy-like), her voice climbing ever higher in search of an octave big enough to hold it". Embling of Tiny Mix Tapes wrote that "[...]" if sung by anyone else, 'I Miss You' would be a thin wisp of a ballad, but Beyoncé allows her voice to crack at the right moments, moving tenuously, self-consciously through the soft, circular melody." He concluded that songs like "I Miss You" and "Start Over" would earn deserved spots in "the Beyoncé pantheon" once fans take the time to grow attached to them. Referring to "I Miss You", Alexis Petridis of The Guardian wrote that "the [19]80s influence is not always a bad thing." He considered the song to be "a woozy update of an old-fashioned slow jam", further stating that "it is probably pushing it a bit to call it an R&B equivalent of Ariel Pink's hypnagogic pop, but there's something enveloping and dream-like about it." Ian Walker of AbsolutePunk commented that "[the] hollow beat and dismal synthesizers, allow[ed] Beyoncé and her morosely beautiful voice center stage. [...] Beyoncé delivers a believable performance effortlessly." By contrast, Greg Kot of the Chicago Tribune was negative, writing that "['I Miss You' is] easily overlooked with its forlorn keyboard and beat-box chintziness." Similarly, Consequence of Sound writer Chris Coplan felt that the ballad is "too-saccharine-for-its-own-good." The Guardian's critics Ben Beaumont Thomas and Rebecca Nicholson ranked "I Miss You" at numbers four and nine respectively on their lists of The 10 Best Tracks of 2011. Mesfin Fekadu from the Associated Press dubbed "I Miss You" as a classic.

== Live performances ==
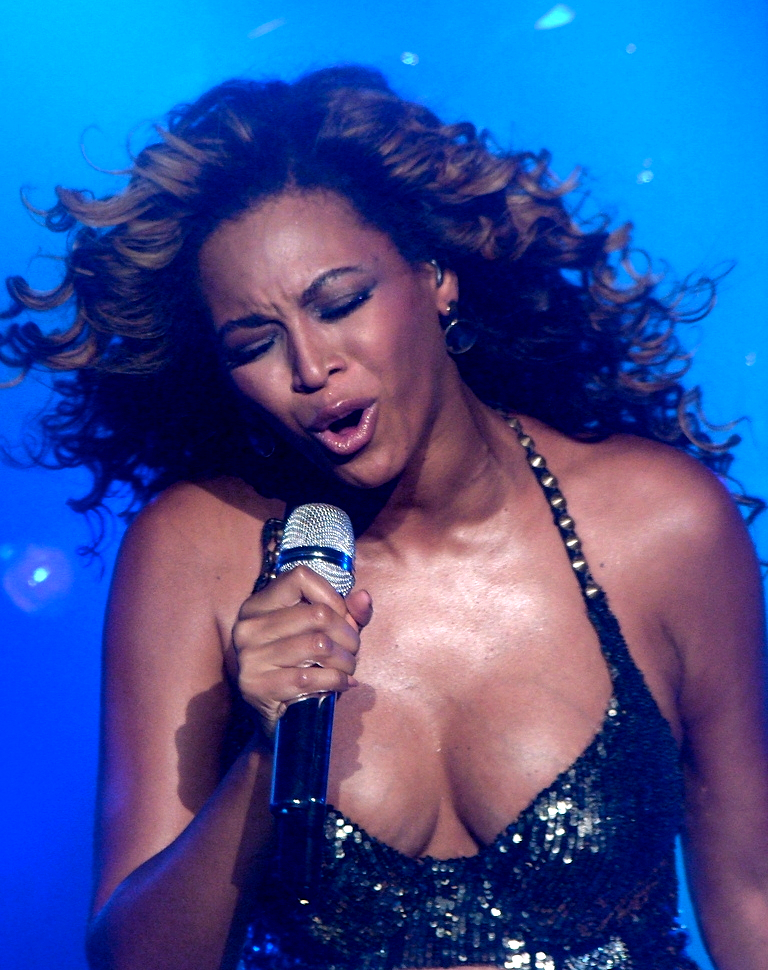
Beyoncé performing during the 4 Intimate Nights with Beyoncé revue.

Beyoncé performed "I Miss You" live for first time on August 14, 2011 during her 4 Intimate Nights with Beyoncé in Roseland Ballroom, New York City. She performed the song in front of 3,500 people wearing a gold dress and backed by her all-female band and her backing singers, called the Mamas. During the ITV special A Night With Beyoncé which aired on December 4 in the United Kingdom, Beyoncé performed "I Miss You" to a selected crowd of fans.

In May 2012, Beyoncé performed "I Miss You" during her Revel Presents: Beyoncé Live revue in Revel Atlantic City. An electronic backdrop behind Beyoncé and a male dancer in kinetic, black-and-white stripes accompanied Beyoncé on stage. Dan DeLuca of The Philadelphia Inquirer noted that "the set list tipped too heavily at times toward bombastic balladry like 'I Care' and 'I Miss You'". Jim Farber of Daily News commented that the song was sung with "precision and sweep, she tipped the balance decidedly softer, giving her power grounding". Tris McCall of New Jersey On-Line wrote, "Even 'I Miss You,' perhaps the least flashy song in her catalog, felt like a necessary breather, and an occasion for her to break out her conversational lower register."

== Cover versions ==
On November 5, 2011, Ocean performed "I Miss You" at the House of Blues in New Orleans. Dressed in a black suit with a red-and-white bandana around his head, he sat down at an electric piano to perform it live to end the evening. The crowd also sang along. Alex Rawls of Rolling Stone found his performance to be "warm and soulful". British indie pop band The xx covered the song on February 14, 2013 during their concert in Austin, Texas and later posted the cover on their official blog. Their cover of the song was a duet between Romy Madley Croft and Oliver Sim accompanied by spare guitar and bass. Their cover of the song was described as "great" by Jenn Pelly of Pitchfork Media, while Sam Weiss of Complex magazine praised the performance saying that the band made the song sound similar to their own material from the album Coexist (2012). Chris Martins of Spin magazine commented that "It's exactly what you'd expect to hear, and it's exactly as beautiful as you'd hope it would be."

== Chart performance ==
Selling 16,032 digital downloads, "I Miss You" opened at number 34 on the South Korea Gaon International Singles Chart for the week ending July 2, 2011. Following the release of 4, "I Miss You" also charted at number 184 on the UK Singles Chart on July 9, 2011, based on downloads alone.

Chart (2011)	Peak position
Portuguese Ringtone Chart	20
South Korea Gaon International Singles Chart	34
UK Singles Chart	184

== Certifications ==
Certifications for "I Miss You"
Region	Certification	Certified units/sales
United States (RIAA)	Gold	500,000^{‡}
^{‡} Sales+streaming figures based on certification alone.
