= Nekesa Mumbi Moody =

American editor and journalist

- Moody in 2024
- Born: New York, US
- Education: Columbia University (BA)
- Occupations: Editor, journalist
- Title: Editorial director of The Hollywood Reporter

Nekesa Mumbi Moody is an American journalist and editor. She is currently the editorial director of The Hollywood Reporter.

== Biography ==
Moody is a native of New York. She received her B.A. from Barnard College of Columbia University in 1992. At Barnard, she started as a political science major with an intention to pursue a career in law. She interned with the NAACP Legal Defense and Educational Fund in college and worked for the Columbia Daily Spectator.

Moody began her career in journalism in Albany, New York, as an intern for the Associated Press (AP). She later became a reporter, covering state news, politics, sports, and entertainment. She became an editor on the AP's national editing desk in 1998 and was appointed musical editor in 2000. As reporter, she covered the Grammy Awards, Super Bowl halftime shows, and the death of Michael Jackson. She was also the first to break the deaths of Whitney Houston and Prince.

In 2012, Moody was named the AP's global editor of entertainment and lifestyles. In April 2020, she was named the next editorial director of The Hollywood Reporter as it undergoes a transformation from a trade publication into a magazine-style publication. She is the first black woman to hold the top editor role at the publication.

Moody is a member of the National Association of Black Journalists.
