= TSAT =

Tsat or TSAT may refer to:

- Tsat language, a language spoken in Hainan, China
- Target start approval time, a facet of Airport Collaborative Decision Making
- Thinking Schools Academy Trust, a multi-academy trust in the United Kingdom
- Tarlac School of Arts and Trades, now Tarlac State University, Philippines
- Transformational Satellite Communications System
- Transferrin saturation in medicine, the ratio of serum iron and total iron-binding capacity
- Tsat, a Cantonese vulgar word
- Tilted single axis tracker, a type of solar tracker
- Target Startup Approval Times, see DMAN for further details
- Tactical Situational Awareness Test, a method to measure situational awareness at the small unit tactical level
- T_{sat}, the saturation temperature
