= CGSB =

CGSB is an abbreviation which may refer to a number of different things:

- Chatham Grammar School for Boys
- Simón Bolívar Guerrilla Coordinating Board
- Canadian General Standards Board
