= Les Twins =

Twin French hip-hop dancers (born 1988)

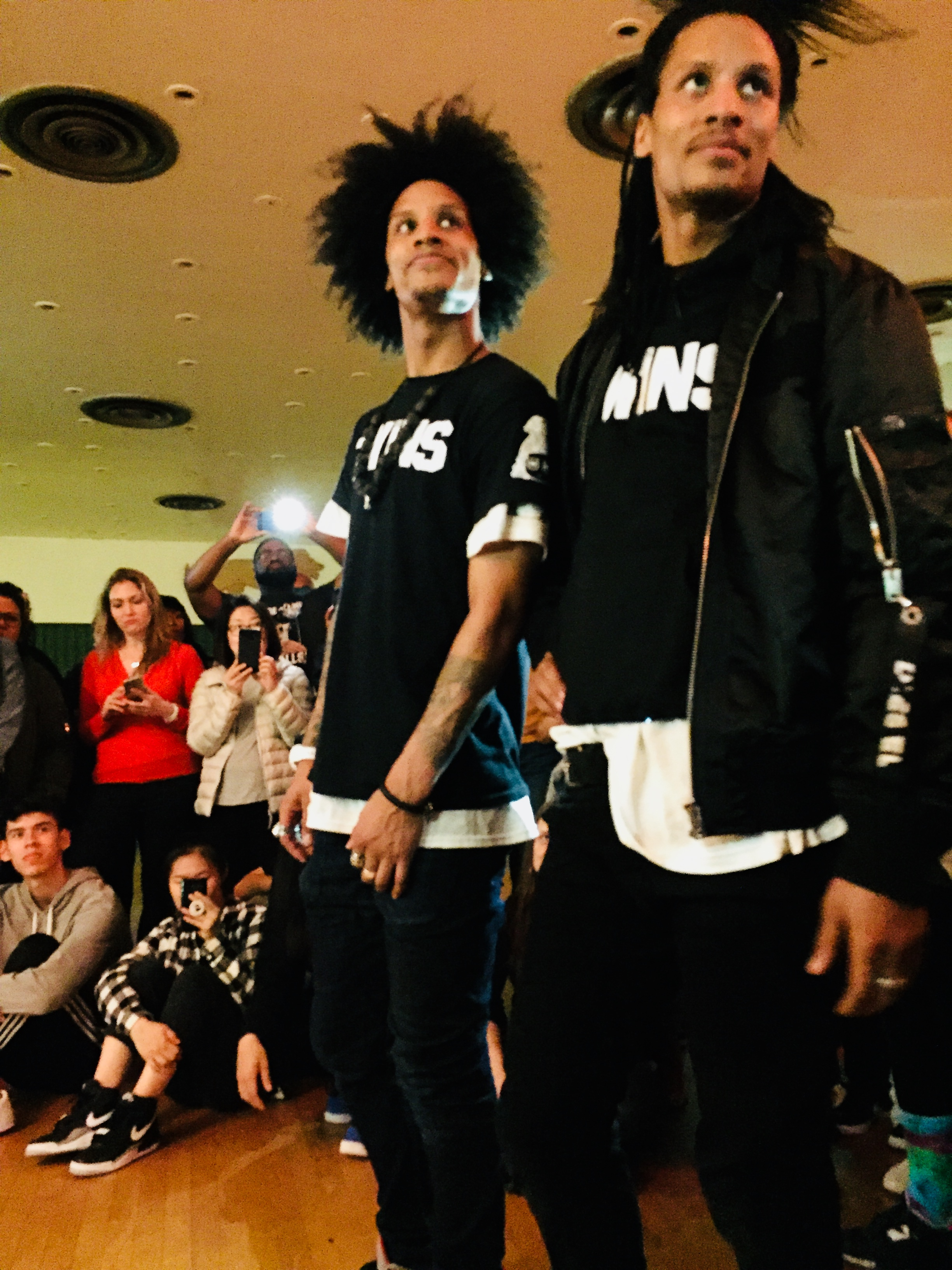
- Larry Bourgeois (left) and Laurent Bourgeois (right) at their San Francisco dance workshop in April 2019

Background information
- Born: 6 December 1988 (age 37); Sarcelles, France
- Genre: Hip-hop dance
- Occupations: Dancers; Choreographers; Models; Producers; Musicians; Designers; Entrepreneurs; Actors; Creative directors for "Eleven Paris"
- Members: Laurent Nicolas Bourgeois; Larry Nicolas Bourgeois

Laurent and Larry Nicolas Bourgeois (born 6 December 1988), professionally known as Les Twins, are French dancers, choreographers, producers, models, designers, and creative directors of their brand "Eleven Paris". Often referred to by their respective nicknames, "Lil Beast" and "Ca Blaze", they are recognized internationally for their talents in new style hip-hop dancing, and various dancing styles.

Born and raised in Sarcelles, France, the self-taught dance duo became the favorites of the French audience in 2008 as finalists on the popular television show Incroyable Talent. They quickly rose to prominence in the United States after a video of their performance on the San Diego leg of the 2010 World of Dance tour went viral on YouTube, with over 46 million views as of 1 December 2019. In 2011, they won the hip-hop new style division of the prestigious international street dance competition Juste Debout. In 2017, they won the American reality competition series World of Dance, executively produced by Jennifer Lopez. The series featured solo acts and larger groups, competing for a grand prize of US$1 million.

Les Twins have been featured dancers for various music artists, including, Jason Derulo, Big Sean, Beyoncé, Meghan Trainor, and Missy Elliott. Standing at a height of 6'4" (193 cm) tall, the brothers have modeled for French haute couture fashion designer Jean Paul Gaultier and appeared in many high-profile, commercial advertising campaigns, such as YSL, Chanel, Gucci, Prada, Versace, Jay-Z's Rocawear, Givenchy, Vouge, Emporio Armani, Jordan and Beats by Dre. They have also walked for many shows before becoming celebrities. In 2019 Les Twins also signed with The Jordan Family, where they collaborated on the Air Jordan 1 Retro High Les Twin – Fearless.

In addition to teaching their original choreography in workshops around the globe, they are also the founding members of the successful dance team Criminalz Crew and founding members of "Eleven Paris".

== Early life and career beginnings ==
The twins were born on 6 December 1988, in Sarcelles, a commune in the northern projects of Paris, France. They are the youngest in a large, Guadeloupean extended family of 9 children.

Neither Larry nor Laurent received any formal dance training. Instead, they learned by observing other breakers, lockers, and poppers and by teaching themselves classical ballet techniques. At the age of 12, they began performing in concerts and musicals. According to WAD Magazine, "They were born dancers. They walked at 5 months, seriously moved their bodies at 18 months old, and at 9 they showed off steps they had invented to youngsters twice their age in their neighborhood."

In 2005, the brothers recruited five members to form their own dance team called Criminalz Crew, spending the next few years competing in hip-hop tournaments and entertaining crowds as street performers and in clubs. In 2007, they danced to sold-out audiences in the musical Pas de Quartier at France's esteemed Avignon Festival.

== Dance career ==
In March 2008, Les Twins gained the attention of the dance community by defeating French street dancers Joseph Go and Meech Onomo at the semi-finals of the prestigious international dance competition Juste Debout. Following that success, they were finalists and audience favorites on Season 3 of Incroyable Talent (the French equivalent of Britain's Got Talent) aired on M6. On 13 November 2008, the twins were among the top twelve finalists competing on the Incroyable Talent finale show attended by Princess Stéphanie of Monaco and watched by over 4 million viewers. In 2009, they were contracted to perform the two-man hip-hop comedy stage revue Twins choreographed by their long-time coach Abibou "Playmo" Kébe at the Théâtre Trévise in Paris.

In August 2010, a video of their performance on the World of Dance tour in San Diego went viral on YouTube. On 9 November 2010, they made their U.S. television debut on The Ellen DeGeneres Show.

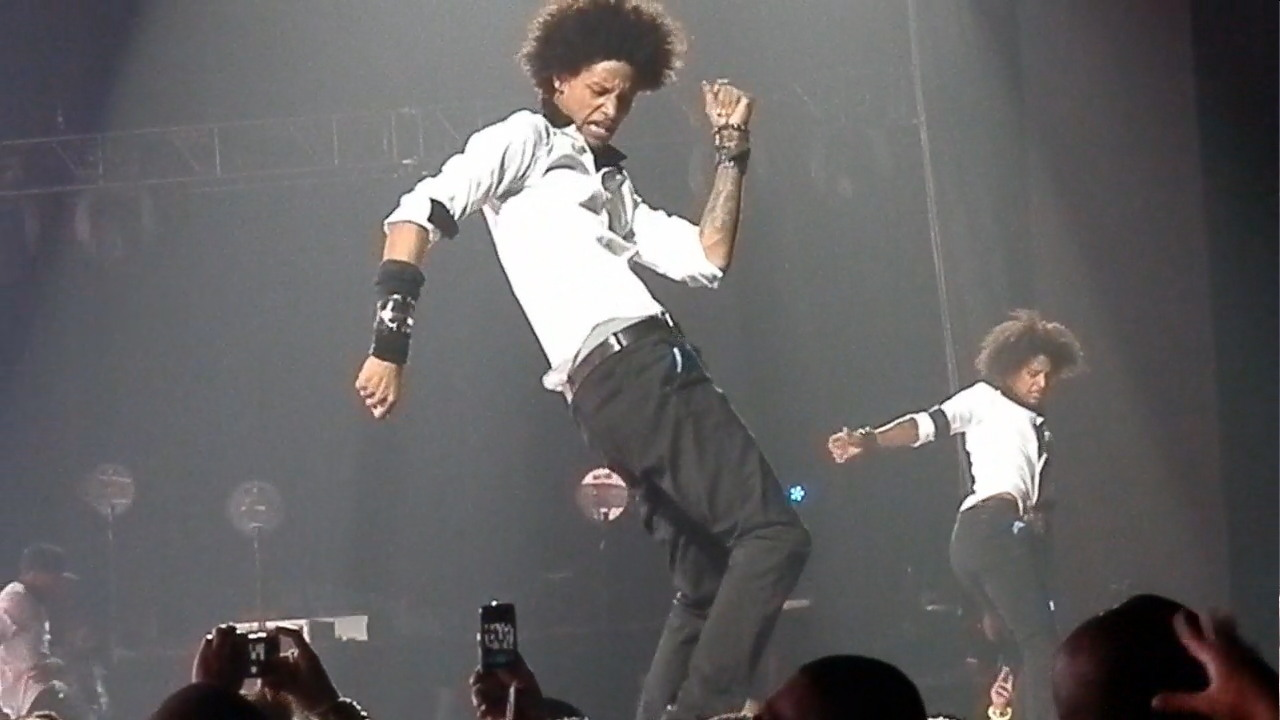
Les Twins performing at the Revel Presents: Beyoncé Live concert in Atlantic City on 28 May 2012

In March 2011, the twins won the Hip-hop New Style division at Juste Debout, beating out over 353 dancers. That same year they performed alongside Beyoncé at the 2011 Billboard Music Awards, the U.K.'s Glastonbury Festival, the BET Awards, and the Good Morning America Summer Concert Series, garnering even greater attention on the world stage. They also joined her on the French television shows X-Factor and Le Grand Journal to promote her then upcoming album 4, and were the only featured male dancers in the alternate version of her "Run the World (Girls)" music video. Their collaboration with Knowles would continue in May 2012 at the Revel Presents: Beyoncé Live concert series in Atlantic City.

Larry and Laurent were star dancers on the Michael Jackson: The Immortal World Tour by Cirque du Soleil until December 2011.

On 6 March 2012, the pair joined rapper Big Sean on-stage at the after-party for Kanye West's Fall 2012 fashion show at La Halle Freyssinet in Paris. One month later, they performed with Missy Elliott and Timbaland at Hennessy's "Wild Rabbit" campaign launch event in New York.

Les Twins debuted on Japan's largest television network Nippon TV on 24 July 2012.

During November 2012, they guest starred on the television dance competition Everybody Dance! in Ukraine and teamed up again with Missy Elliott at the Beats on the Beach event in Abu Dhabi and the Back2Black Festival in Rio de Janeiro, Brazil.

In December 2012, the twins began working on multiple projects with Sony Japan. In 2013, they toured with Beyoncé as the only male dancers on The Mrs. Carter Show World Tour. The duo was also featured in the music video of "Blow" and "Jealous" from Beyoncé's self-titled fifth studio album.

In 2012 and 2014, Les Twins appeared in episodes of Avengers of eXtreme Illusions, the revolutionary dance series by Welling Films. After the videos came out, Les Twins put their own cut of Welling's work on their own YouTube channel.

In 2014, Les Twins joined Beyoncé and her husband Jay-Z on their On the Run Tour. In 2015, Les Twins appeared in a special freestyle dance in the song "Tattoo" in Bollywood film ABCD 2, which was directed by Remo D'Souza. They were featured in Beyoncé's 2018 Coachella performance.

In 2023, Les Twins accompanied Jason Derulo on the "Friday Livez" tour.

In 2023, they joined Beyoncé on the European and North American legs of her Renaissance World Tour.

In 2024 Les Twins joined Jason Derulo on both his Nu King World Tour and his Vegas Residency.

In 2025, they joined Beyoncé during the European shows of her Cowboy Carter Tour.

== Modeling ==
Les Twins are signed with NEXT Model Management in Paris. In 2010, they walked the runway at Paris Fashion Week for the Jean Paul Gaultier Fall 2010 Men's Collection.

They have since been featured in numerous web, television, and print advertising campaigns, including for Jay-Z's viral video campaign "That's Rocawear", New Era, Benetton, Givenchy, H&M, Adidas, Pioneer Steez, EMOBILE, Emporio Armani, Hogan, Vouge, Hennessy, Jordan, 25 Magazine, Beats By Dre, and Hewlett-Packard.

== Choreography ==
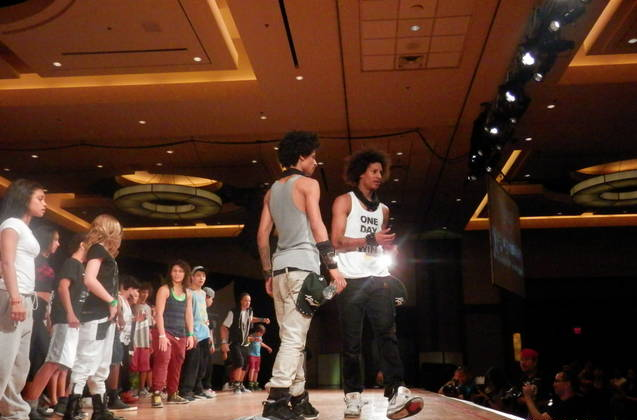
Les Twins teaching at the HHI Urban Moves Workshop in Las Vegas on 5 August 2012

Larry and Laurent have traveled the globe teaching their original choreography in countries including France, the U.S., Japan, Canada, Russia, Germany, Italy, Finland, Ukraine, Poland, Hungary, the Czech Republic, and Kyrgyzstan. Crowds of up to 5000 people have been in attendance at some of their international dance workshops.

In 2010, they choreographed the dance sequence to the song "Jump" by Kris Kross in the Wii video game Just Dance 2.

In June 2011, Fox broadcast a portion of the audition piece of contestants D*Day (Damon Bellmon and Deon Lewis) on Season 8 of the dance competition So You Think You Can Dance. Although they were accused by many of plagiarizing their choreography from Les Twins' World of Dance San Diego performance on YouTube, D*Day was allowed to proceed to the next stage of the competition. In 2012, Bellman and Lewis returned on the So You Think You Can Dance Season 9 Atlanta auditions show claiming (with archived footage from the Show) their prior year's routine was a homage to Les Twins’ work.

In 2018 Laurent helped choreograph for Luka and Jenalyn for their performance in the 2018 Blackpool Music Festival.

In 2024 Les Twins Choreographed the music video for KING & Jason Derulo - Bumpa

== Artistry ==
=== Dance style ===
Les Twins’ dance style is often categorized as New Style hip-hop, a commercial form of hip hop with a strong emphasis on isolations and musicality. However, the twins are known for having created a unique style from this dance which they refer to as "Twins-Style". Due to their ability to anticipate and finish each other's moves, the brothers quickly gained a reputation for their timing and skill at making freestyle dance look like choreography. Charlotte Guillemin of WAD Magazine wrote:

They have really created a form of hip-hop that is truly individual to them...They are in perfect symbiosis. They look totally disjointed with their very jerky movements, although at the same time displaying an amazing fluidity. They undulate, bend and twist, impossible to assess where their center of gravity lies: both phenomenal and unreal.

=== Influences ===
Larry and Laurent credit their major inspirations as Jim Carrey, Jackie Chan, Bruce Lee, Michael Jackson, their coach Abibou "Playmo" Kébe, cartoons, and their own siblings, all of whom are also dancers.

=== Public image ===
Les Twins are immediately recognizable for their large afros and trademark style of dress—backwards pants, neck warmers, and kneepads worn around the ankles. Regarding their tendency to adopt other unique accessories, such as beaded bracelets and necklaces, wristbands, watch chains, scarves, and ladies’ wear, Laurent stated: "We have changed consciousness about fashion."

== Television appearances ==
2008

- Oct 2 – Nov 13: Incroyable Talent (France) – contestants/finalists

2010

- Nov 9: The Ellen DeGeneres Show (U.S.) – guests
- Nov 12: ABC News (U.S.) – featured in interview on turfing dance style

2011

- May 22: 2011 Billboard Music Awards (U.S.) – performed with Beyoncé
- June 26: Glastonbury Festival 2011 (U.K.) – live televised BBC performance with Beyoncé
- June 26: 2011 BET Awards (U.S.) – pre-taped footage from Glastonbury performance with Beyoncé
- June 27: X Factor (France) – performed with Beyoncé
- June 28: Le Grand Journal (France) – performed with Beyoncé
- Nov 8: Dancing With the Stars (U.S.) – performed with the Michael Jackson: The Immortal World Tour
- Aug 17: Les Twins: Born to Dance (U.K.) – BET International documentary

2012

- May 24: The Making Of A Concert Part 1 of 2 (U.S.) – footage from Revel Presents: Beyoncé Live performance
- July 24: Star Draft Conference (Nippon TV/Japan) – guests/judges
- Nov 9: Everybody Dance! (Ukraine) – guests
- Nov 17: Dancer's World "Les Twins Special" (Japan) – Music On! TV interview with host Sam

2013

- Feb 3: Beyoncé O2 Priority TV Ad (U.K.) – promotion of The Mrs. Carter Show World Tour
- Feb 16: Life Is But a Dream HBO special (U.S.) – rehearsal footage from the 2011 Billboard Music Awards
- Feb 22: VH-1 Best Week Ever (U.S.) – commentary on Les Twins' appearance in Life Is But a Dream
- Mar 31: Vivement Dimanche (France) – actress Monica Bellucci discusses discovering Les Twins via footage from their final 2008 Incroyable Talent performance
- May 19: Beats By Dre Neon Mixr Commercial (U.S.) – promotion of Neon Mixr headphones for Target retail stores
- June 1: Chime For Change's "The Sound of Change Live" charity concert at London's Twickenham Stadium (broadcast to 150 countries) – performed with Beyoncé
- June 2: "The Women's Concert for Change: Live from London" (U.S.) – NBC 2-hour special with highlights from the live Chime For Change concert performance

2014

- Jan 29: The Arsenio Hall Show (U.S.) – guests
- Jan 31: 106 & Park (U.S.) – guests
- Apr 21: Encontro com Fátima Bernardes (Brazil) – guests
- Aug 24: MTV Video Music Awards (U.S.) – performed with Beyoncé
- Sep 3: So You Think You Can Dance Season 11 finale show (U.S.) – guest performers
- Nov 26: HP Pavilion x360 "Bend the Rules" Commercial (U.S.)

2015

- Feb 11: The Queen Latifah Show (U.S.) – guests
- Jun 10: The AppNexus Summit (Europe) (King's Place London, U.K.)
- Jun 11: Marrakech du rire (Morocco) – guests & performed with Jamel Debbouze

2017

- Les Twins competed and won the first season of the 2017 reality program World of Dance.
- Aug 24: Telemundo interview & "Premios Tu Mundo" (TV station) - Guests & Performed

2018

- Révolution (Canada) – Judges

2019

- Dance Plus 5 (India): guests

== Film appearances ==
Year	Film	Role	Language	Release	Ref.
2013	Live in Atlantic City	Themselves	English	22 November 2013	
2015	ABCD 2	Themselves	Hindi	15 June 2015	
2016	Zubaan	Themselves	Hindi	4 March 2016	
2019	Men in Black: International	The Twins, a shape-shifting alien duo seeking a dangerous artifact: Larry Bourgeois also portrays the human that the Twins kill and base their appearance on	English	11 June 2019	
2019	Cats	Plato and Socrates	English	20 December 2019	
2019	Homecoming: A Film by Beyoncé	Themselves	English	17 April 2019	
2023	Renaissance: A Film by Beyoncé	Themselves	English	1 December 2023	

== Music video appearances ==
- "Danse avec moi" by Les Déesses (2007)
- "Joie de Vivre (Zouglou Dance)" by Magic System (2008)
- "Ca fait mal Remix" by La Fouine (2008)
- "Dilly Dally" by Hakimakli featuring Jamie Shepherd (2009)
- "La Gloria" by French-Argentine band Gotan Project (2010)
- "Run the World (Girls)" alternate video by Beyoncé (2011)
- "End of Time: Live at Roseland" by Beyoncé (2011)
- "Play Hard" by David Guetta featuring Ne-Yo and Akon (2013)
- "Now Is The Time" by Wally Lopez featuring Jasmine Villegas for Pepsi (2013)
- "Blow" by Beyoncé (2013)
- "Jealous" by Beyoncé (2013)
- "Flawless (Remix)" featuring Nicki Minaj by Beyoncé (2014)
- "Bang It To The Curb" by Far East Movement (2014)
- "Lips Are Movin" by Meghan Trainor (2014)
- "Ayo" by Chris Brown and Tyga (2015)
- "Dope Walk" by A$AP Ferg feat. Cara Delevingne (2015)
- "Sapés comme jamais" by Maître Gims feat. Niska (2015)
- "WTF (Where They From)" by Missy Elliott featuring Pharrell Williams (2015)
- "Ándale" by Oryane & Jillionaire (Major Lazer) feat. Mical Teja (2021)
- "Stranger" by Les Twins (2021)
- Mirror by Les Twins (2021)
- Diamond Platnumz x Jason Derulo ft Khalil Harisson & Chley - Komasava Remix (2024)
- Jason Derulo & MIchael Bublé - Spicy Margarita (2024)
- Jason Cerda X Les Twins - Pa'Mi (2024)

== Awards and nominations ==
- Won – 2010 Battle of the Stylez - Germany
- Won – 2011 Juste Debout Japan (Preselections): Hip-hop New Style Division
- Won – 2011 Juste Debout Finals: Hip-hop New Style Division
- Won – 2011 Dance@Live Japan Hip-hop West Division (battled each other in the finals - Laurent won individually)
- Nominated – 2011 Youth Rocks Awards: Rockin' Dance Group of the Year
- Won – 2012 Hip Hop International: All Styles Final World Battle (Larry won individually)
- Won – 2012 Freestyle Session 15: Top Styles/All Styles Division
- Won – 2014 World of Dance Industry Awards - Simple Mobile Game Changer Freestyle Award
- Won – 2014 World of Dance All Styles 2 vs. 2 Final, Las Vegas
- Won – 2015 Full Force "7 to Smoke" All Styles Battle, Las Vegas (Larry won individually)
- Nominated – 2015 World of Dance Industry Awards - Simple Mobile Game Changer Freestyle Award
- Nominated – 2015 Teen Choice Awards - Choice Dancer
- Won – 2017 World of Dance
- Won – 2022 Fusion Concept Festival World Final
- Won - 2023 Juste Debout Gold - Hip Hop Final (Laurent won individually)

== Gallery ==
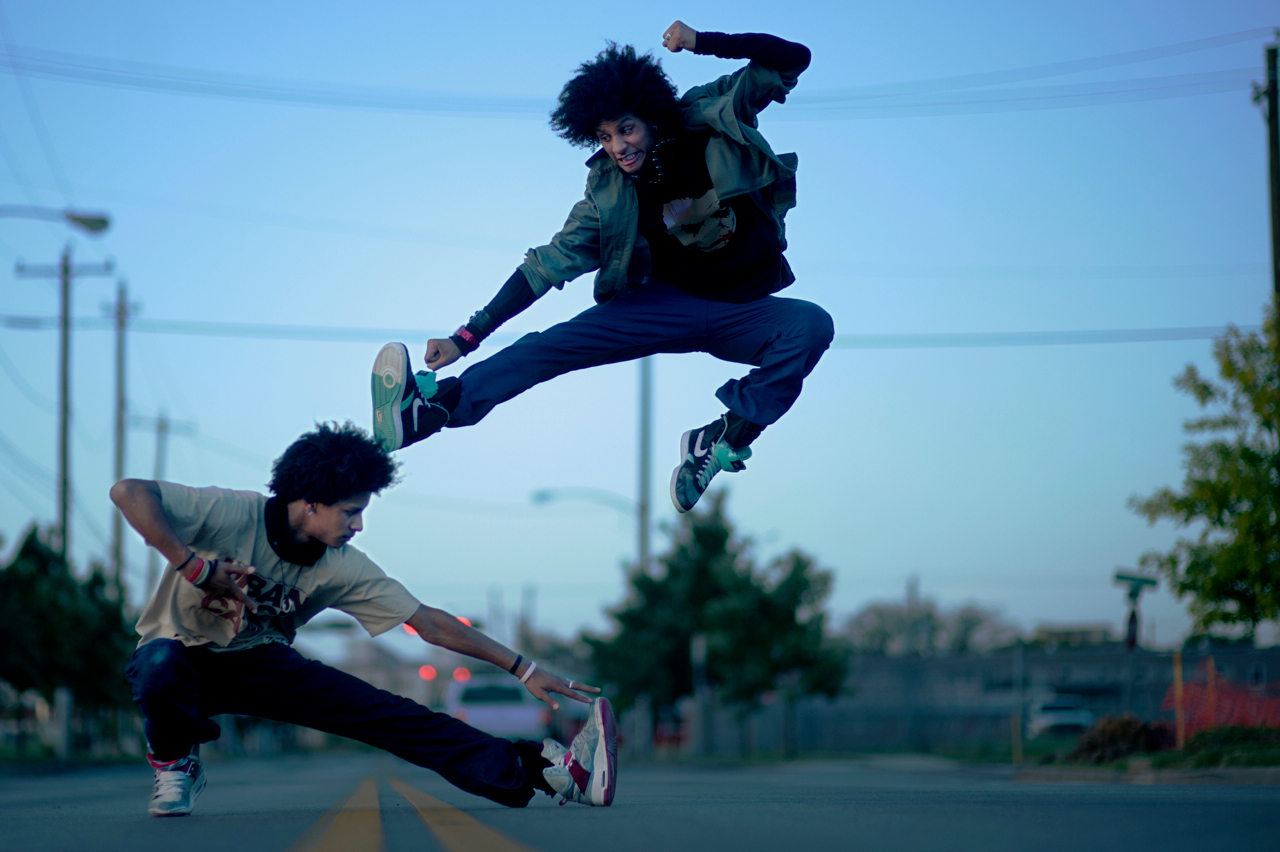
Les Twins photo shoot with Welling Films' Shawn Welling

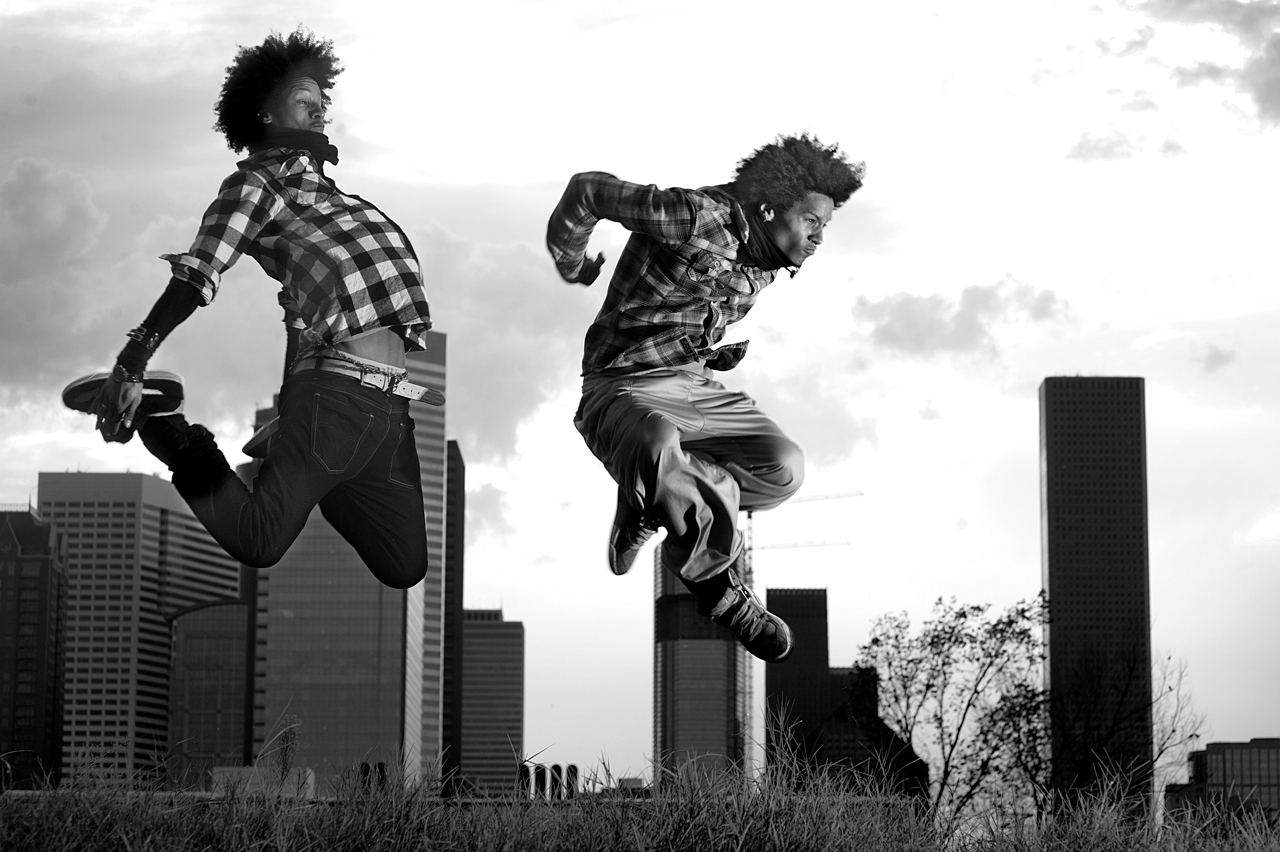
Les Twins in action

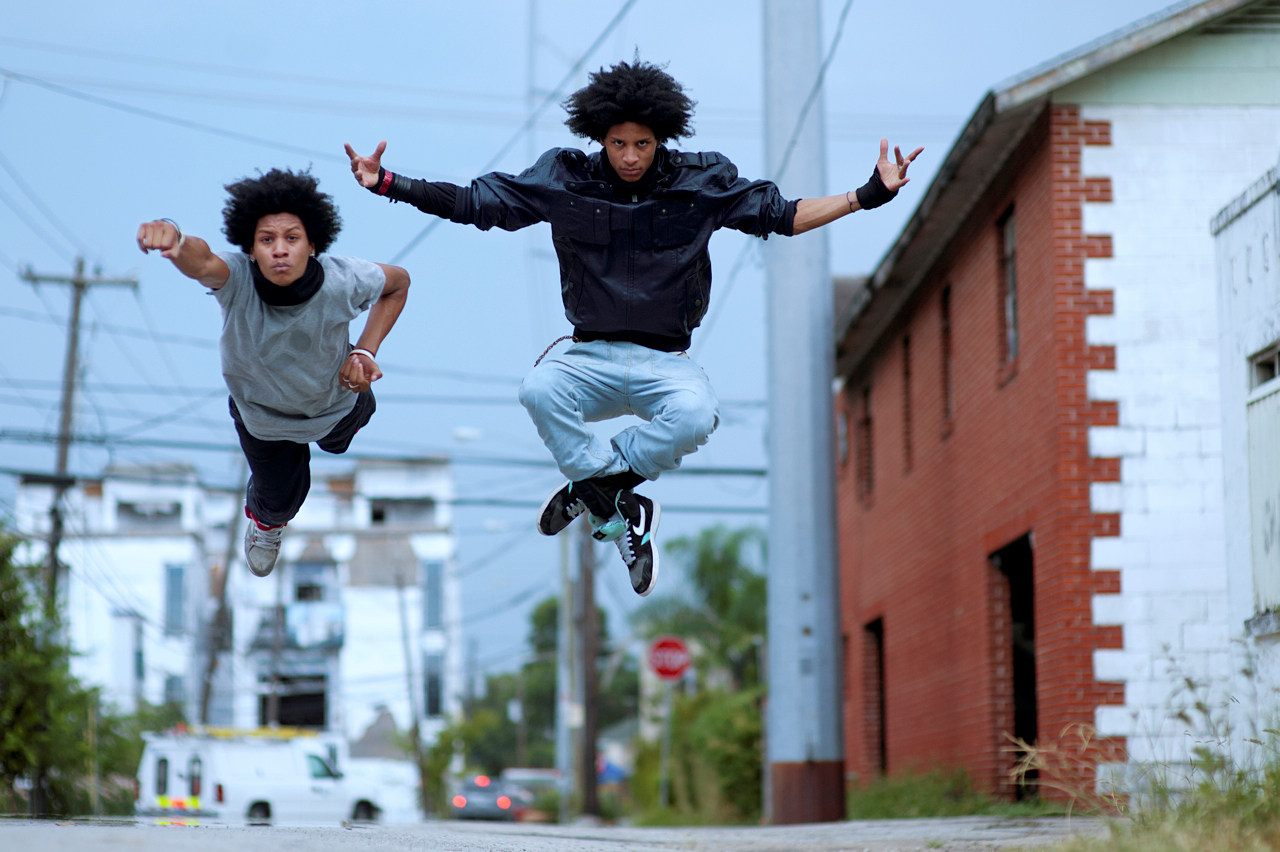
Les Twins mid-air during a shoot with Shawn Welling

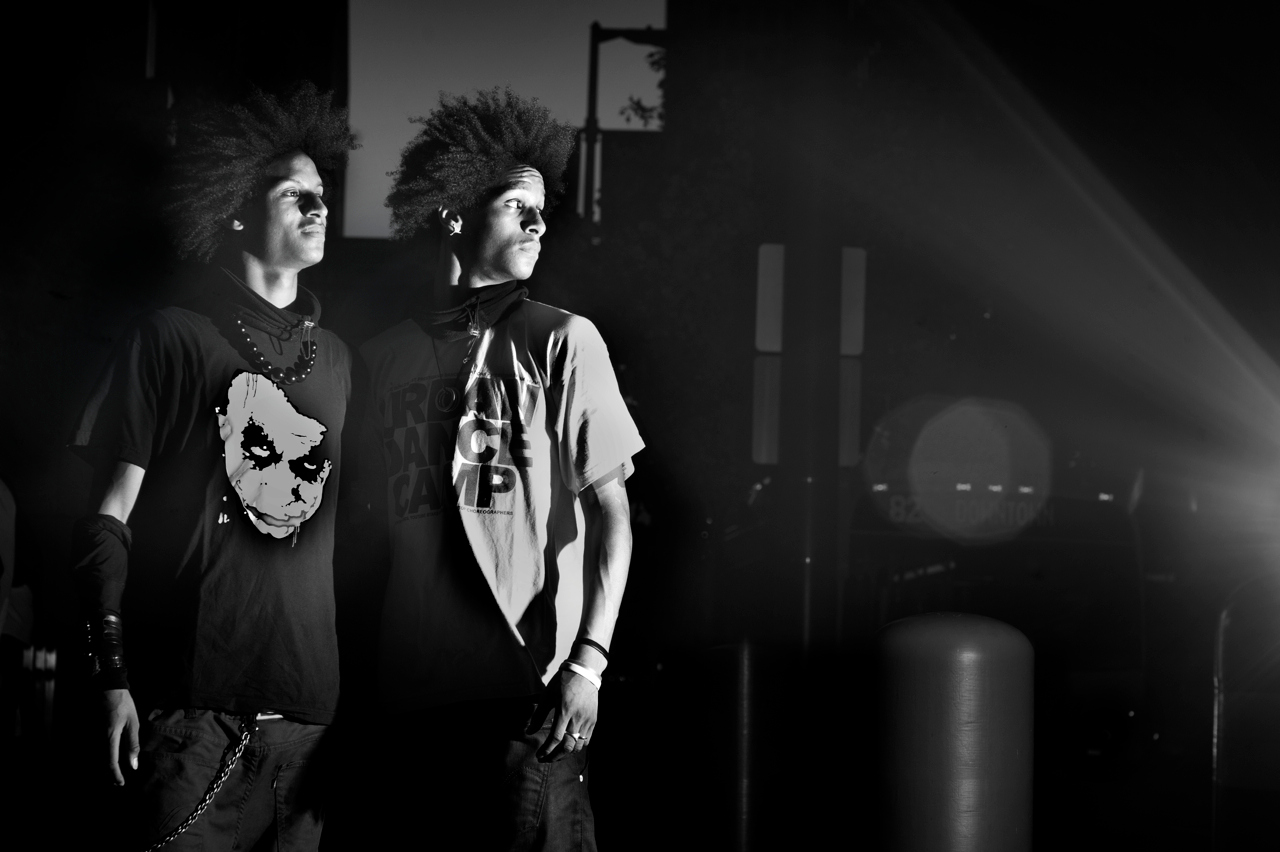
Les Twins at World of Dance 2010 in Vallejo, CA

== See also ==
- List of dancers
