= Portsmouth Academy =

The Portsmouth Academy

Location
- St Mary's Road; Portsmouth, Hampshire, PO1 5PF; England; 50.804°N 1.074°W

Information
- Type: Secondary, Academy
- Established: 1930
- Trust: Thinking Schools Academy Trust
- Department for Education URN: 139714 Tables
- Ofsted: Reports
- Principal: Natalie Sheppard
- Staff: +100
- Gender: Coeducational since 2017
- Age: 11 to 16
- Enrolment: 1200
- Capacity: 1250
- Houses: Hypatia; Socrates; Plato; Aristotle
- Website: www.theportsmouthacademy.org.uk

The Portsmouth Academy (formerly the Portsmouth Academy for Girls and before that City of Portsmouth Girls' School) is a secondary school with academy status, located in Portsmouth, Hampshire, England on St Mary's Road in the central district of Fratton near St Mary's Church. Originally established as a girls' school, it became co-educational in the 2017/18 school year.

== History ==
=== 1890–1975 ===
The original school building was St Mary's School, built circa 1890. It first became a school for girls in 1930 as the Junior Girls Department of the nearby Penhale Road Board School. The building became one of the early casualties of bombing in Portsmouth during World War II and was subsequently demolished. With post-war reorganisation resulting from the Education Act 1944, the Kingston Modern School for Girls was created in 1949. This was initially based at the Penhale Road site, rather than the St Mary's site, and had 250 girls on roll. This figure soon increased until it became impossible to accommodate the number of pupils. By 1954, with numbers still increasing, it became clear that a new building would be necessary at the St Mary's site.

The new Kingston Modern School for Girls building opened on its present site in 1957. It cost £105,821 to build and consisted of a main three-story block with 20 classrooms including specialist rooms for science, art, craft and domestic science and a library. There was also a hall, stage and a dining area (now the foyer), and a gymnasium (now the dining hall). The site was much smaller then, being surrounded to the north and west by houses that no longer exist today. Pupil numbers continued to increase and a new extension, which is now the current Science and Technology block, was completed in the 1960s.

=== 1975–1994 ===
In 1975 education in Portsmouth was again reorganised resulting in the creation of the City of Portsmouth Girls' School as a comprehensive school for girls between the ages of 12 and 16. As a result, the site increased in size again, with a large sports field (which used to be housing), a new sports hall, and another new complex, which is now the humanities block.

=== 1994–2001 ===
In 1994 education was once again reorganised in Portsmouth and the school became an 11–16 comprehensive school, taking girls from age 11. To accommodate additional numbers, another new block for teaching Modern Foreign Languages and Technology was added, together with the all-weather multi-sport pitch, completed in 1998. practice rooms, additional office space and a new changing room for the Dance Studio was completed in February 2001.

=== 2006–2017 ===
In 2006 the 'Training & Learning Centre' was built on the school grounds. This building is used by the school for lessons and other activities and is also open to bookings from the local council as well as private individuals and groups. The centre contains offices, a fully equipped Information Technology suite, classrooms and conference room. The school achieved specialist Humanities College status in 2008.

After a poor Ofsted, where it was declared to be a failing school, it converted to academy status in September 2013. The school was then renamed Portsmouth Academy for Girls. Its sponsor was the Thinking Schools Academy Trust

In its first inspection as an academy, in 2015, Ofsted found the girls only academy had very strong leadership. All middle leaders, teachers and governors had high expectations for students’ achievement and behaviour. This had led to significant improvements in the quality of teaching and students’ progress speeding up. Students behaved well in classrooms and corridors being polite and courteous and showing empathy for those in difficulties. They felt safe and had good attitudes to learning. Governors were using their skills, expertise and experience effectively to enforce accountability.

== Description ==
The Portsmouth Academy (for Girls) was a smaller than the average-sized secondary school with 533 students in 2017, that was given a fresh start and academy status in September 2013. It is sponsored by the Thinking Schools Academy Trust which is led by is Rochester Grammar School. A large number of the former school's staff have moved away. The proportion of disadvantaged pupils supported by pupil premium funding is well above the national average and the proportion of pupils who speak English as an additional language is also well above average. But the proportion of pupils who have special educational needs and/or disabilities is lower than in other schools.

The Academy opened in April 2013, replacing its predecessor school, which had been judged as inadequate by Ofsted.

The current principal is Natalie Sheppard, she is supported by the Director of Secondary, Gwynn Bassan, who is the former Principal of The Rochester Grammar School, Kent. Stuart Gardener is the CEO of the Thinking Schools Academy Trust. The school was accredited with International Thinking School status in July 2016, and became mixed (co-educational) name change with a slight name change in September 2017.

The last Ofsted inspection was in 2017, where it was recognised that the new management was outstanding and had successfully reversed the decline in English, and Maths and had the preparations in place to transform science teaching.

Most teachers have high expectations of their pupils and set challenging activities in lessons. In English and mathematics, teachers consistently plan focused activities which are pitched appropriately to challenge all pupils, irrespective of their starting points. In the less successful subjects the more able students are not sufficiently challenged, and subject teachers from other schools in the trust are assisting in producing a more suitable curriculum.

== Curriculum ==
Virtually all maintained schools and academies follow the National Curriculum, and are inspected by Ofsted on how well they succeed in delivering a 'broad and balanced curriculum'. Schools endeavour to get all students to achieve the English Baccalaureate (EBACC) qualification; this must include core subjects, a modern or ancient foreign language, and either History or Geography.

Since its inception Portsmouth Academy has been committed to the Thinking Schools philosophy, where students are supported to think for themselves through the development of a thorough understanding of purposeful thinking tools they can use to aid and monitor their own progress. Staff are encouraged to think accurately and reflectively about their practice and understand a range of thinking tools that can be used to support student motivation and progress.

Students in Years 7 and 8 (in Key Stage 3) study English, Science, Mathematics, Geography, History, Modern Languages, PE, RE, Art, Food Technology, and Drama.

In Year 9, choice is introduced and the GCSE syllabus will be started in core subjects. Students study English, Science, and Mathematics. They choose between History or Geography, and between French, Spanish, or Civics. There are also classes in Drama, Art, RE, PE, Technology, and Food.

Students in Years 10 and 11 (Key Stage 4) study a core of English, Science, Mathematics, and PE. They then have 4 other subjects. Each student has their own personalised pathway, and options are arranged so some may study for the EBACC.
