= Lattke =

Lattke is a German surname. Notable people with the surname include:

- John E. Lattke, myrmecologist
- Michael Lattke (1942–2023), German scholar of the New Testament and early Christianity
- Martin Lattke (born 1981), German tenor
