= Franzmann =

Franzmann is a German surname. Notable people with the surname include:

- Joelle Franzmann (born 1978), German triathlete
- Majella Franzmann
- Martin Franzmann (1907–1976), American Lutheran clergyman and theologian
- Tobias Franzmann (born 1990), German rower
- Vivienne Franzmann (born 1971), English playwright
