= Thinking Schools Academy Trust =

British multi-academy-trust

- Founded: 27 August 2010
- Type: Multi-academy trust
- Registration no.: 07359755
- Location: The Thinking Schools Academy Trust, Park Crescent, Chatham, ME4 6NR
- Website: www.tsatrust.org.uk

The Thinking Schools Academy Trust is a multi-academy trust serving a family of schools mainly in the Medway authority.

The Trust bases its philosophy on the work of Bob Burden and the University of Exeter Postgraduate School of Education. The schools teaching and learning is based on cognitive development and sees its duty as teaching children how to think rather than memorising content.

== Thinking tools ==
Children are taught to discuss their learning, this is done by using Thinking Tools and Strategies. These include:

- Thinking Maps
- Thinking Hats
- Thinkers’ Keys
- Habits of Mind
- CoRT Thinking Tools
  - Q-matrix
  - SMART targeting
  - Growth mindsets
- Philosophy for Children

== Accreditation ==
It is an objective of the trust that all its schools will receive Thinking School accreditation. It is a whole school process that starts with the planning:

- Thinking Skills
- Reflectional Questioning
- Visual Mapping
- Collaborative Networking
- Developing Dispositions
- Structuring the Environment

== Associated Schools ==
These schools are all in the Thinking Schools Academy Trust:

=== Secondary ===
- Goodwin Academy, Deal
- Holcombe Grammar School, Chatham
- Plymouth High School for Girls
- The Portsmouth Academy
- The Rochester Grammar School
- The Victory Academy, Chatham

=== Primary ===
- All Faiths Children's Academy, Strood
- Cedar Children's Academy
- The Gordon Children's Academy, Strood
- Isambard Brunel Junior School
- Meon Infant School
- Meon Junior School
- Moorings Way Infant School
- New Horizons Children's Academy
- Newbridge Junior School

=== Other ===
- New Horizons Teaching School Alliance
- Thinking Fitness

== Academies under construction ==
- Maritime Academy, Strood: After many delays, the school is projected to open in 2022. The site off Parsonage Lane and Berwick Way, Strood was purchased in 2020, after Medway Council unwrote the costs of overage. The construction consists of an all-through school with a 1150 place secondary school and sixth form with sports hall, parking, playing fields and hard-surfaced courts. They currently only have Year 7 & 8 students. Currently, the school is located in Twydall.

The Grade I listed Manor Farm Barn will be extended to provide a wedding/conference facility. Conversion and extension of a former cattle barn will provide overnight accommodation.

== Management issues ==
In April 2016 the chief executive officer of the Thinking Schools Academy Trust, Rochester Grammar School's former headteacher, Denise Shepherd was suspended due to allegations of snooping on staff emails, bullying staff and doctoring parts of an external inspection report. Shepherd has since resigned.
