= Gymnasium Schwertstraße =

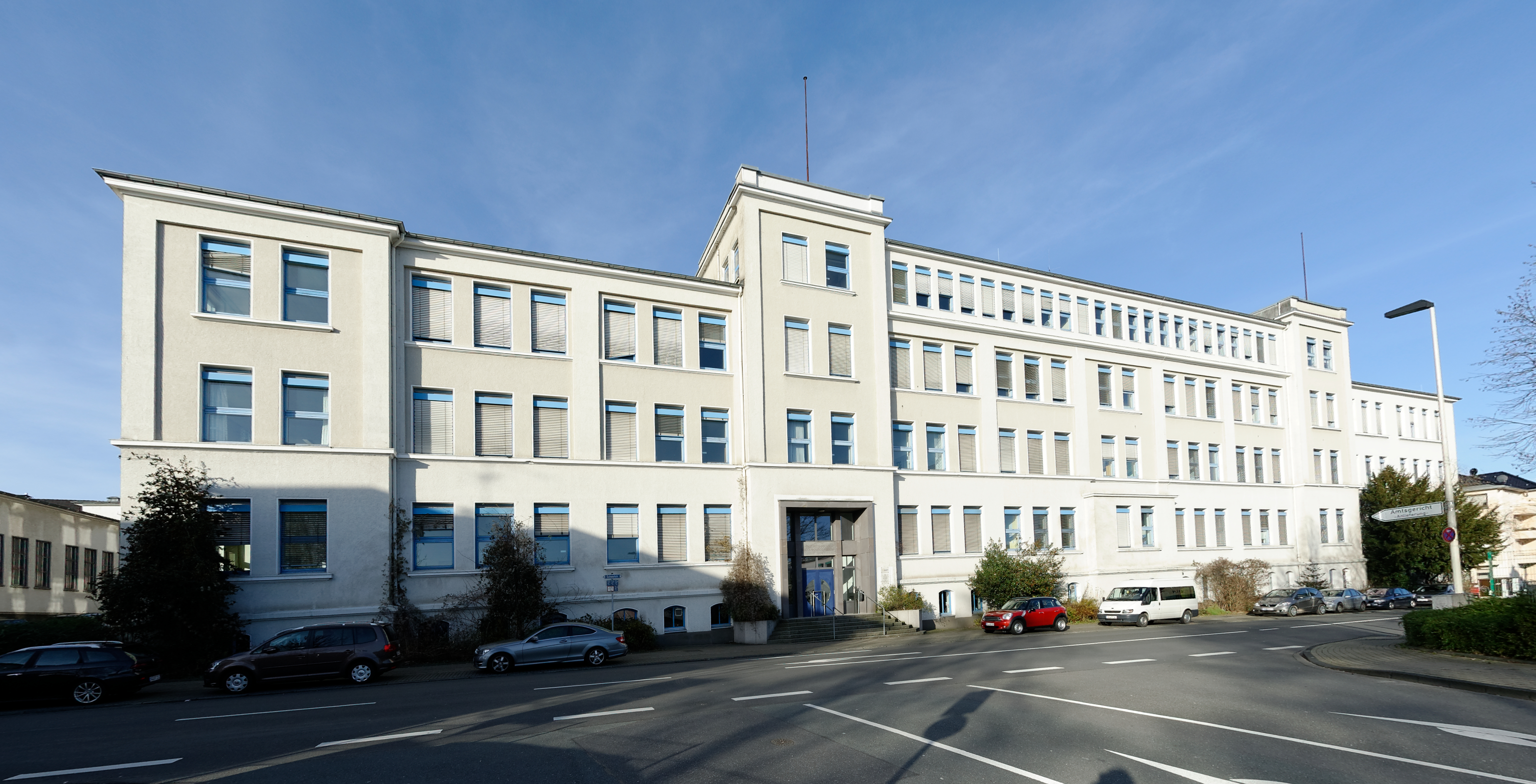
- Gymnasium Schwertstraße

Location
- Schwertstraße 19; Solingen, 42651; Germany
- Coordinates: 51°10′7.43″N 7°5′22.7″E

Information
- School type: Gymnasium (Grammar School)
- Established: 15 October 1841; 184 years ago
- Founder: Jacob Martin Philippi
- Gender: coeducational
- Enrollment: c. 1000 (2006)
- Website: www.gymnasium-schwertstrasse.de

The Gymnasium Schwertstraße in Solingen, North Rhine-Westphalia, Germany was established on 15 October 1841 as the Höhere Bürgerschule, and is the oldest and most traditional of the four gymnasiums in the city.

== History ==
The school opened with 23 pupils with lessons being held in the Rathaus, and later in the Catholic Pfarrhaus in the Brunnenstraße and the former Vollmannschen Lateinschule on the corner of Klosterwall and Neustraße. In 1859, it moved into its own building in Friedrichstraße, and in 1897 to the new building in Schwertstraße. In 1899, it changed to being a gymnasium, and in 1902, it had pupils completing the abitur for the first time. From 1918 to 1924, the school building was used to accommodate a Scottish regiment, and lessons were held in the local court and in a vocational school.

In 1930, 28 pupils from the school and from the Junior Technical School in Chatham each visited the other school. This is claimed to be the oldest proven instance of schools in Germany and England having a student exchange. In 1935, the school was renamed Moeller-van-den-Bruck-Schule. From 1943 to 1945, lessons were held in Salzungen und in Goethe-Schule in Ilmenau. The school building was destroyed in air strikes on 4 and 5 November 1944. From 4 October 1945, lessons were held in a shift system in Schule Zweigstraße an in nearby grammar school August-Dicke-Schule. A World War II Hochbunker still stands on Gymnasium Schwerstrasse's school grounds today. It was built on the same spot on which the Solingen Synagogue Malteserstrasse used to stand until it was destroyed during Kristallnacht on 9–10 November 1938. In January 1946, the school was renamed Gymnasium Schwertstraße. On 27 October 1952, the school moved into the rebuilt site in Schwertstraße. In 1971, the school became co-educational by accepting girls for the first time. Until this day, Schwerstrasse students are responsible for projects regarding the Old Synagogue as well as the upkeep of Solingen's old Jewish cemetery.

In addition to the boys' school exchange with Chatham Grammar School for Boys, Gymnasium Schwertstrasse also established a girls' student exchange with Stratford-upon-Avon Grammar School for Girls.

Gymnasium Schwertstrasse also has a French exchange programme with the Lycée Mathias in Solingen's sister city Chalon sur Saône.

== Bilingual Studies ==
In 1997 it became the first secondary school in Solingen to establish a bilingual "Anglo-German" stream. Two out of the four or five new classes every year are bilingual. Students enrolled in the bilingual stream have more English lessons per week. In Years 5 and 6, they have 7 English lessons per week instead of the regular 5. These extra lessons are used for creative projects like rewriting and performing sketches. From Year 7 onwards, Geography, History and Politics are taught primarily in English, using English study materials and text books. In Year 7, bilingual students also spend a 1-week class trip in England. At first, students stayed in host families in Canterbury, but this was later changed to Eastbourne. Bilingual students who want to study in German can switch to a regular class and forfeit their bilingual status. However, regular students who'd like to switch to bilingual can't do so due to the vocabulary discrepancy in History, Geography and Politics.

Students who choose to stay bilingual until they graduate with their Abitur need to take Advanced courses in English bili as well as advanced or intermediate courses in either History bili or Geography bili up until final exams. Students who graduate from bilingual classes receive an Additional Certificate of Anglo-German bilingual studies with their Abitur. Those first two bilingual classes from 1997 gained their Abitur in 2006.

== Notable alumni ==
- Rudolf Cronau
- Georg Meistermann
- Walter Scheel
- Klaus Dick
- Michael Lattke
- Jaqueline Wendel
- Michael Lesch
- Rüdiger Neitzel
- Richard David Precht
- Veronica Ferres
