= Plymouth High School for Girls =

Location
- St Lawrence Road; Plymouth, Devon, PL4 6HT; England

Information
- Type: Grammar school; Academy
- Motto: Non scholae sed vitae discimus (Latin:For life not school we learn)
- Established: 1874
- Founder: Frederick Temple
- Local authority: Plymouth
- Trust: Thinking Schools Academy Trust
- Department for Education URN: 148369 Tables
- Ofsted: Reports
- Chair of Governors: Gary Chapman
- Head teacher: Simon Underdown
- Gender: Girls
- Age: 11 to 18
- Enrolment: 835
- Houses: Anthony , Kendall , Latimer and Temple
- Website: https://www.phsg.org/

Plymouth High School for Girls (PHSG) is a girls' grammar school founded in 1874. It is located on St Lawrence Road in Plymouth, Devon, England, close to Mutley Plain and Plymouth city centre.

== History ==
In February 1874 the Devon and Cornwall Girls' School Company was formed, opening a school for girls in Sherwell House, North Hill (only a few hundred metres from the school's current location), on 14 September that year. It was intended that the school should move to other premises and for this purpose a fund had been set up to purchase a suitable site. Land surrounding a detached property known as 'North Hill' was chosen and the first part of these new premises were opened by the bishop of Exeter, Doctor Frederick Temple, on 21 January 1878. North Hill house became the home of the headmistress, Miss Kendall. A new building was designed by a Mr Paull and erected by Messrs Blatchford of Tavistock. £3,000 was expended on the purchase of the site and a further £10,000 on the buildings.

North Hill house was demolished in 1939 for the construction of a new wing.

By the 1960s the school was using rooms in the large building next door, known as 'The Annexe'. This had previously been The South Devon and Cornwall Blind Institute, built in 1876. The Annexe is believed to be located roughly where a fort stood during the siege of Plymouth in the Civil War of the 17th century, and before that to have been the location of The Maudlyn, a leper house. In around 1976 the school took over the whole building.

Plymouth High was once a fee-paying school, at least up until the 1940s.

During World War II an 'Emergency High School' was set up amalgamating Plymouth High School for Girls, Devonport High School for Girls and the now defunct Stoke Damerel High School for Girls with the PHSG Head Mistress, Miss Violet Turner, as its headmistress. The school was also one of the 19 food centres open in Plymouth by April 1941. The school was one of the three of these centres which served a two-course meal between noon and 2:30 pm and again between 5:30 pm and 7:30 pm for the price of 9d (nine old pence).

In recent times PHS has seen the building of the Newman Hall, the Science and PE blocks, the Metcalf building and a sixth Form centre.

Previously a community school administered by Plymouth City Council, in February 2021 Plymouth High School for Girls converted to academy status. The school is now sponsored by the Thinking Schools Academy Trust.

The school's motto is "Non scholae sed vitae discimus", a quotation from Seneca which translates as 'For life not school we learn', and forms the refrain of the old school song.

The School's crest which features on the uniform is made up of four symbols, which are displayed equally on a shield and include:

- An owl representing wisdom.
- A beehive representing a busy and productive community.
- An emblem of the school's initials PHS.
- The coat of Arms of the City of Plymouth since 1931, which depicts four towers (the old Plymouth Castle) in a cross of St Andrew (the dedication of the mother church of Plymouth) .

== Present day ==
Catering for pupils from year 7 (age 11) up to year 13 (age 18) PHSG is a single-sex grammar school (from ages 11 to 16) requiring pupils to pass the eleven plus exam in order to gain entry. Post 16 the school is co-ed with an increasing number of boys on roll from 2010. The school draws its pupils mainly from the city of Plymouth but about a third come from outlying areas of Devon and Cornwall.

The aim of the school is to "promote, achieve and celebrate the highest possible standards in all forms of achievement, throughout the school, and particularly in the specialist subjects: Mathematics, Science, Design Technology and Information Communication Technology". The school is also has Training School status.

Ms Utton became headmistress in January 2008 after the departure of Mrs. Martin, the head teacher from 1999 to 2007, who in turn was preceded by Mrs Stogall. During the interim periods the school was led by Mr Holden, the deputy head teacher (now retired). The school's 6th Form has been led by Mr Callaghan since April 2008 after the retirement of the previous head of 6th Form, Mrs Caroline Enock, who had taught at the school for 25 years.

In 2011 Ofsted graded the school as 'Good' with many outstanding features. The school has also won the Bar Mock Trial.

== Curriculum ==
Girls can choose from a wide range of subjects at GCSE level and generally take 11 or 12 subjects. In some subjects, especially able girls can choose to skip the GCSE and move straight to the AS level.

In 2009 Plymouth High School was chosen as the first state school in the city to offer the International Baccalaureate, an alternative to A Level awards.

== International links ==
Plymouth High School gained the full International Schools Award in October 2006. This is an award given to schools that have shown a commitment to international activities across the curriculum and have developed strong partnership with schools in other countries. PHSG has links with schools in Ghana (particularly Ahantaman Secondary School) as well as New Zealand, Germany, France, China and Russia. The school also runs an Amnesty International club for pupils.

== School houses ==
The school has four houses:

House	Colour	Info
Anthony	Green	Named after Alice Anthony, the school's first pupil
Kendall	Blue	Named after the school's first head mistress
Latimer	Yellow	Named after a regional press publisher who championed girls education in the city
Temple	Red	Named after the bishop who opened the school

Each house elects a house captain from the sixth form. The school houses play a large part in school life, for instance they compete in many annual house events:

- Sports day (usually taking place in the summer)
- Swimming gala (also usually occurring in the summer term)
- Music festival
- Science festival
- Drama festival
- Gym and dance festival (usually taking place in the winter term)
- Interhouse netball, tennis, science and hockey competitions

Junior house captains assist the house captains.

== Academic standards ==
Plymouth High School consistently ranks as one of the top performing schools in Plymouth (and ranks well amongst schools in the rest of Devon and Cornwall) in terms of examination results. In 2011 97% of pupils achieved 5 or more A*-C grade GCSEs, including English and Mathematics.

== Notable former pupils ==
- Rebecca Lenkiewicz, the first female playwright to ever have her play performed on the main stage of the National Theatre and step daughter of the painter Robert Lenkiewicz.
- Corinna Lawrence, Olympic fencer for Team GB who reached the last 32 in the women's individual épée at the 2012 Summer Olympics.

Plymouth High School for Girls has an Old Girls association with around 260 members. The association meets for a dinner in the spring and again at the school in the autumn for a buffet and AGM. The member of staff designated as the PHS link to the Old Girls is Mr Neve.
