= Rochester Grammar School =

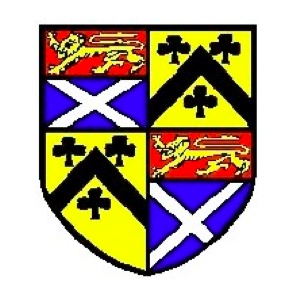
- The Rochester Grammar School Shield

Location
- Maidstone Road; Rochester, Kent, ME1 3BY; England
- Coordinates: 51°22′17″N 0°30′03″E

Information
- Type: Grammar school; academy
- Motto: Sub umbra alarum tuarum ("'Neath the Shade of Thy Wings")
- Established: 1888; 138 years ago
- Trust: Thinking Schools Academy Trust
- Department for Education URN: 136313 Tables
- Ofsted: Reports
- Executive Principal: G. Bassan
- Head teacher: C. Brinklow
- Gender: Girls, mixed 6th form
- Age: 11 to 18
- Enrolment: Over 1,100
- Houses: Byron Cassidy Fitzgerald Hildegard Somerville Tomlinson
- Website: www.rochestergrammar.org.uk

Rochester Grammar School (known as Rochester Grammar School for Girls until 2006) often abbreviated to RGS is a grammar school for the education of girls between the ages of 11 and 18. It has academy status. It is now known as just "Rochester Grammar School" following the introduction of boys into the sixth form, despite the rest of the school remaining single sex.

Rochester Grammar School is located on Maidstone Road, opposite the Sir Joseph Williamson's Mathematical School.

== History ==
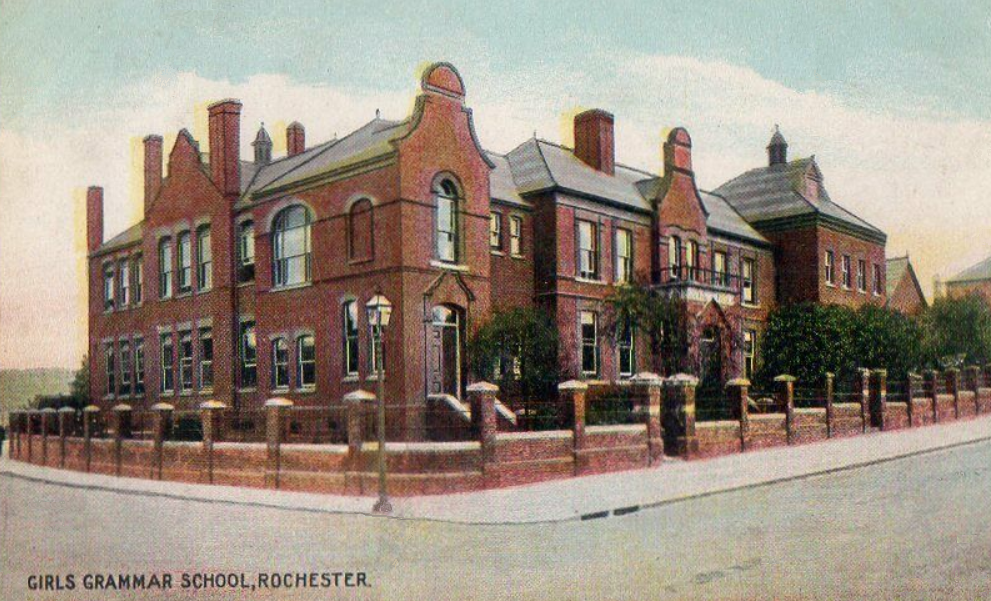
Original school building opened in 1889 and closed in 1990

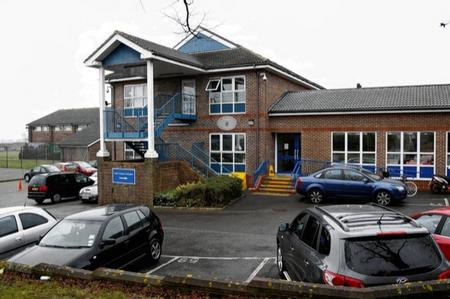
Front view of part of the current school

The Rochester Grammar School for Girls was established in 1888 under the powers of the Endowed Schools Act 1869, which allowed the charitable trustees of the Bridge Wardens to donate the necessary funds for a girls’ grammar school. This was seen as progressive as it pioneered education for girls. Each year the school celebrates its founding with a special service at Rochester Cathedral.

The school building, near the centre of Rochester, was opened in January 1889 by the Countess of Darnley. The school included a morning kindergarten, which closed in the late 1930s.

In 1939, after the outbreak of the Second World War, the school building was taken over by the Civil Defence and the pupils were evacuated to Canterbury, moving in 1940 to Pontypridd then Porthcawl in South Wales. Several bombs fell on the school site during an incendiary raid in 1941, the main school building suffering slight damage. From 1941 an increasing number of pupils began to return to live in Rochester, and in 1942 the school was reopened, although parts of the building remained occupied by the Civil Defence until mid-1944.

The first male teachers were appointed in the 1960s. In 1969 additional school buildings were opened 1.3 km south of the existing school on the outskirts of Rochester. The need for staff and pupils to commute between the two sites, overcrowding and the dilapidation of the old building eventually led to the decision to consolidate the school at one location, and in April 1989 work began on additional buildings on the newer southern site. The original school building was finally closed in 1990, and the site sold for housing and a health centre.

The move to the new site allowed for the school's expansion, and it has grown in size to more than 1,100 students, with almost 300 in the sixth form. Since 2004 male students have been admitted to the sixth form, resulting in a change in the school's title in 2006 to "Rochester Grammar School" – removing the words "for Girls".

The school became grant-maintained in 1993, with funding directly from central government. In November 2010 the RGS became an “Academy of Excellence” under the government's academy programme for outstanding schools, and is a combined Mathematics/ICT and Music specialist school, the first nationally. Facilities now include a sixth-form centre, a newly built and hi-tech teaching and training suite named after one of the school's famous ex-students, Evelyn Dunbar. Dunbar was the only woman commissioned as a war artist, and her pictures illustrating the home front during the Second World War decorate the suite.

== Subjects ==
The school's subjects include Anthropology, Art, Business Studies, Computing, Design and Technology, Drama, Economics, Film Studies, English, Geography, History, IT, Mathematics, Modern Languages (French, German, Japanese and Spanish), RS, PE, German, Sciences (Biology, Chemistry, Environmental Science and Physics), Philosophy, Politics, Psychology, Drama, Music, Sociology, and PSHE. The school describes itself as a 'Thinking School'; there is an emphasis on the use of Thinking Maps to support teaching and revision. Almost all lessons will include reference to the thinking maps, CoRT1 tools, thinking hats and Habits of Excellence.

=== Key stages ===
The school no longer operates an accelerated two-year Key Stage 3 curriculum, so all pupils enter Key Stage 4 at the beginning of Year 10, when students start to study for their GCSEs. All pupils are expected to aim to achieve the top grades in every subject; the school is well known for its exceptional GCSE and A level results.

== League tables and examination results ==
=== GCSEs & A-Levels ===
A 2010 BBC report ranked the school as having the best GCSE and second best A/AS-Level results in the South East of England.

In 2012 99% of students studying GCSEs attained 5 A*-C grades, including maths and English, and 99% of those studying A-levels (or equivalent qualifications) received at least three.

=== International Baccalaureate (IB) ===
In 2011, The Rochester Grammar School was the top-performing state school for International Baccalaureate nationally. Forty-one of their students completed the IB diploma and a third achieved a score of 40 or more, which is equivalent to four A* grades at A Level. One student achieved the maximum possible score of 45 in their International Baccalaureate examinations, which is achieved by fewer than 1% of students globally.

From 2020, all students entering the school's sixth form study the IB; A Levels are no longer offered. This change has neither been popular with parents nor students. The sixth-form intake fell from 147 in 2019 to 105 in 2020, with only 46% of the school's Year 11 girls opting to stay on rather than to transfer to another sixth form. In the years preceding this change, A Levels had a significantly higher uptake by students than the IB.

On 26 September 2024, the school announced that it was reverting to A Levels from September 2025 onwards.

== Sixth form ==
In 1999 a new sixth-form block, the Peggy Saxby Suite, was opened, with a large common room, a silent study area and several classrooms. This has been changed in the last few years and the common room is now home to a very large silent study hall, the Independent Learning Centre (ILC). The ILC has many computers and desks for students to use during study periods, and a teacher is present during lesson times to ensure the room stays silent. There is no common room, but sixth-form students have access to a separate café during break and lunch time. The sixth form accepts male pupils.

== Sport ==
The school has many girls and a few boys (in the sixth form) who represent the county, and sometimes the country, in a range of sports, including football, skiing, sailing, netball and athletics.

== Music ==
The school is known for the musical abilities of its pupils. There is an orchestra, a flute choir, a main (voice) choir, a gospel choir, a chamber choir, a year seven choir and 'NChant', a choir formed of students from years 9–13 who audition to become members. Year 8 students are also able to reach a bronze Arts Award.

== Notable alumni ==
- Lisa Butler (born 1962) makeup artist
- Natasha Brennan (born 1986), rugby player
- Gillian Chan (born 1954), children's author
- Kat Driscoll (born 1986), trampolinist
- Evelyn Dunbar (1906–1960), war artist
- Charlotte Evans (born 1991), Paralympic skier guide
- Caroline Feraday (born 1977), broadcaster
- Diane James (born 1959), former UK Independence Party leader-elect, and MEP
- Alice Oseman (born 1994), author
- Mildred Ratcliffe (1899–1988), painter, commercial artist & calligrapher
- Dame Sybil Thorndike (1882–1976), actress
- Sophia Webster (born 1985), fashion designer

== Controversies ==
In April 2016 the chief executive officer of the Thinking Schools Academy Trust, to which RGS belongs, and former headteacher Denise Shepherd were suspended due to allegations of snooping on staff emails, bullying staff and doctoring parts of an external inspection report. In July 2016, the Thinking Schools Academy Trust Chairman, Peter Martin paid tribute to Ms Shepherd, who had since resigned, stating that: "The Trust undertook a formal investigation, into allegations of misconduct made against Ms Shepherd. This has now concluded, with no further action required to be taken. It is extremely regrettable that these allegations were leaked to the press by an unknown source."

In July 2017 RGS received national media coverage when it was disclosed that the History Department, when teaching pupils about the 19th-century African slave trade, had provided a worksheet that invited Year 8 pupils to take part in a fictional slave auction, using stereotypical negative qualities about African people; the head of the History Department later apologised on behalf of the school.

In June 2018 the school lost an unencrypted memory stick containing data on more than 1,000 pupils.
