= Holcombe Manor =

Coordinates: 51°21′58″N 0°31′10″E

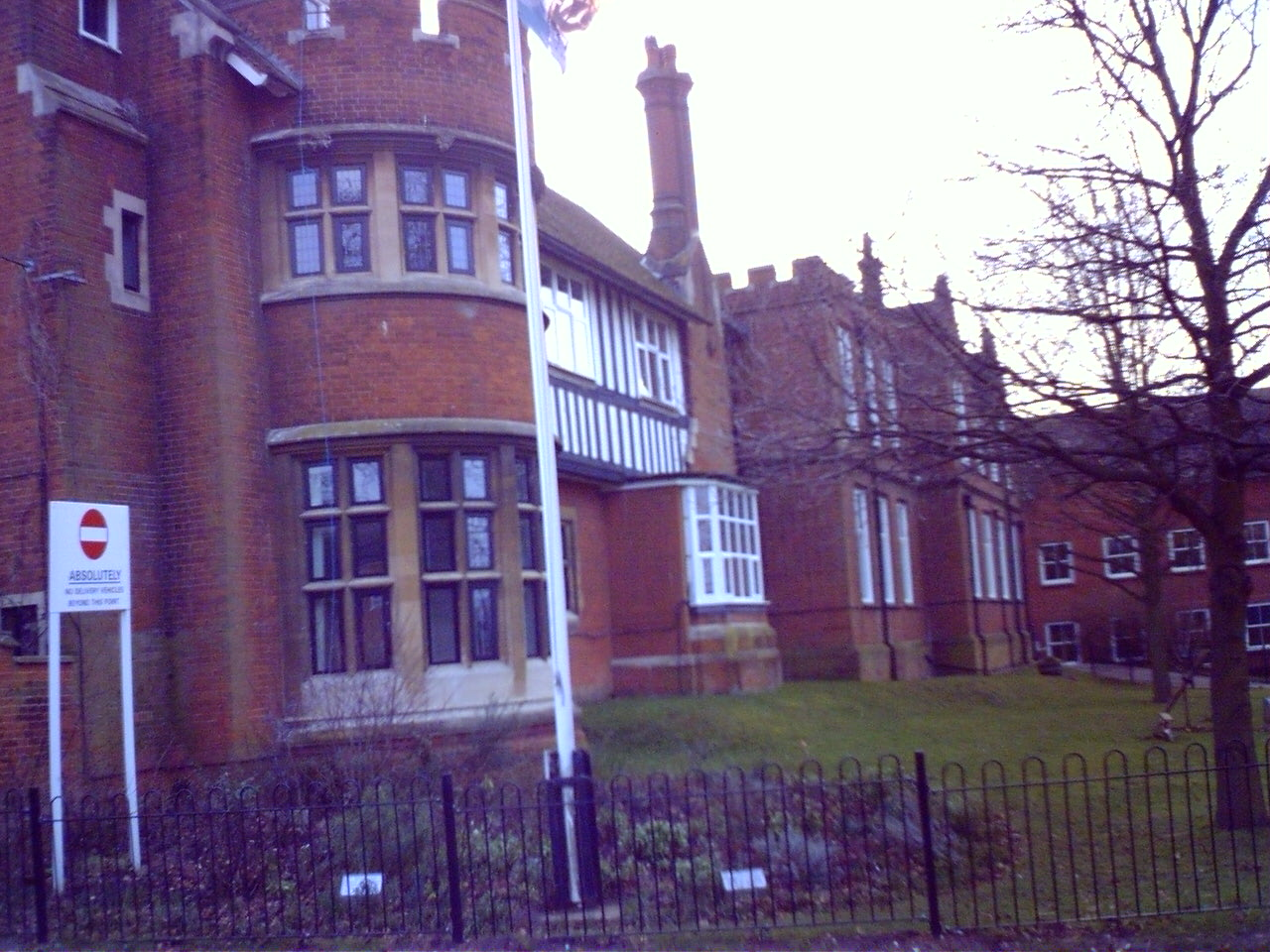
- Holcombe Manor, built 1887
- Interactive map of the Holcombe Manor area
- Former names: Holcombe

General information
- Type: House / School
- Architectural style: Modeled on Holcombe Court, Devon
- Location: Chatham, Kent, England
- Completed: 1887
- Opened: 1920 (as Chatham Grammar School for Boys)
- Client: George Winch

Holcombe Manor was built in 1887 as a house by the first mayor of Chatham, George Winch (September 20, 1842 – February 22, 1914), for him and his wife Mary Clarke Bluette to live in. Mary was brought up in the village of Holcombe Rogus, Devon. Winch built the new family house in a near-identical style to that of her childhood home, Holcombe Court in Devon, calling it Holcombe. There was a lake in the grounds, and a sunken Italian garden. The original building was later extended past the conservatories.

In 1909 Holcombe Manor was put up for auction. The lots were the house itself, the local football ground, Chatham Town F.C., and the surrounding woodland. This area is now occupied by houses, shops and so on.

In 1920 the house became home to Chatham Grammar School for Boys, after which more buildings were built to accommodate students. After 1945 it became a specialist technical school (Chatham Technical School for Boys) and in 1982 it became a grammar school, Chatham Grammar School for Boys.[4] In 2016 the school name was changed in preparation for the planned admission of girls throughout the school. After a consultation with pupils, staff and parents the name "Holcombe Grammar School" was selected. The local authority is now using this name. During the late fifties, pre-fabricated buildings were erected in the grounds to serve as classrooms. These temporary buildings remained on the site for many years. In 2000, construction of the Performing Arts block was started. The last remnants of the sunken garden were destroyed, steps leading out from the Manor's library down to the garden were demolished and the area bricked over. Today the English and Science ("B" Block") stands on the site of the lake.

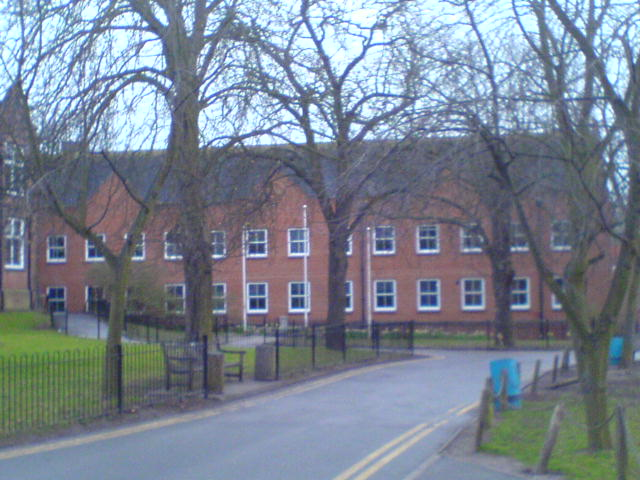
Atrium block opened in 1997 (2007)

The parent-teacher association of Chatham Grammar School for Boys is called the Holcombe Association - it is believed to be the oldest PTA in England. Students are known as "Holcombians".
