= Lisa Butler =

British make-up artist

- Born: Chatham, Kent
- Occupation: Make-up artist
- Years active: 1980s–present
- Notable work: 2008 Cover Shoot & 70-page editorial in Self Service, July 2013 Vogue UK Cover and Editorial with Helena Bonham Carter, January 2013 Cover and Editorial with Kate Moss for LOVE Magazine, Miu Miu Spring/Summer 2013 Campaign
- Website: lisabutlermakeup.com

Lisa Butler is a make-up artist in the fashion industry. She regularly works on advertising campaigns, catwalk shows, fashion films, and editorials. She is responsible for the execution and design of make-up looks that appear on the covers and in editorials of publications like Vogue Paris, American Vogue, Vogue Italia, Vogue Nippon, Vogue UK, Arena Homme +, i-D, Numéro, Harper’s Bazaar, W Magazine, and V Magazine. Butler has also contributed to developing H&M's new cosmetics line, & Other Stories.

== Career ==
Lisa Butler grew up in Chatham, Kent. In the early 1990s, Butler became known for her work in the advertising campaigns of Japanese designer, Yohji Yamamoto. Her looks have since appeared in fashion publications like Vogue, Times Style Magazine, Another Magazine, Interview, 25 Magazine, Self Service, LOVE Magazine, Vogue Korea, Vogue China, and Vogue Nippon Beauty. Her clients include luxury brands like Prada, Pucci, Missoni, Miu Miu, Lanvin, Isabel Marant, Balmain, Givenchy, Dior, Louis Vuitton, Juicy Couture, Nina Ricci, Bulgari, Ohne Titel, 3.1 Phillip Lim, Herve Leger, Roberto Cavalli, Zadig & Voltaire, Alexander McQueen, Jean Paul Gaultier, Yves Saint Laurent, and Chloé.

Butler has collaborated with TEMPTU utilizing specialized airbrushing tools to create subtly sculpted looks for contemporary fashion houses like Helmut Lang. This is a 'bare' aesthetic that Butler frequently applies for the catwalk in order to evoke a sense of modernity, and to draw attention to the clothing. Among her most notable works is a 70-page spread published in the 2008 Fall/Winter issue of Self Service magazine, for which Butler created multiple distinct looks drawing influence from Dalí and ancient Aztec and Incan gods.

Throughout her career, Butler has collaborated with photographers, such as David Sims, Inez and Vinoodh, Karl Lagerfeld, Mario Testino, Mert and Marcus, Mikael Jansson, Nathaniel Goldberg, Alasdair McLellan, Paolo Roversi, Sølve Sundsbø, Patrick Demarchelier, Daniel Jackson, François Nars, Mario Sorrenti, Peter Lindbergh, Ryan McGinley, Willy Vanderperre, Terry Richardson, and Tim Walker.
