= Goodwin Academy =

Location
- Mill Road; Deal, Kent, CT14 9BD; England
- Coordinates: 51.2165°N 1.3923°E

Information
- Type: Academy
- Trust: Thinking Schools Academy Trust
- Department for Education URN: 146624 Tables
- Ofsted: Reports
- Head teacher: Philip Jones
- Gender: Mixed
- Age: 11 to 18
- Houses: Brunel, Carter, Curie, Hawking, Nightingale
- Website: http://goodwinacademy.org.uk/

Goodwin Academy (formerly Castle Community College) is a mixed secondary school and sixth form located in Deal in the English county of Kent.

The school was converted to academy status on 1 October 2010. It was previously a community school administered by Kent County Council, however Goodwin Academy continues to coordinate with Kent County Council for admissions.

The school is sponsored by the Thinking Schools Academy Trust.

== History ==
Castle Community College was converted to academy status on 1 October 2010. was rated Outstanding by Ofsted in 2011 before dropping to Special measures three years later. In the interim it had merged and taken on 400 pupils from the former Walmer Science College, The SchoolsCompany Trust sponsored the school to help it improve and renamed it to SchoolsCompany Goodwin Academy. It was inspected again February 2016 and found to require improvement, then in March 2016, the SchoolsCompany trust collapsed, was disbanded and was stripped of all four of the schools it sponsored. The school, calling itself The Goodwin Academy, became independent before being sponsored by the Thinking Schools Academy Trust and was renamed to be Goodwin Academy.

== Overview ==
Ofsted in its report of 2016 describes the school as a calm smaller average secondary school with a very stable population. The levels of deprivation were high, and the effects of years of difficulty were still hampering progress.

== Buildings ==
The school is housed on a single site in a 3-storey building that opened in September 2017.

== Academics ==
Goodwin Academy offers GCSEs and BTECs as programmes of study for pupils, while students in the sixth form have the option to study from a range of A Levels, OCR Nationals and further BTECs.
