= SchoolsCompany Trust =

British multi-academy trust

- Founded: November 22, 2012
- Dissolved: 2018
- Registration no.: 08304460
- Location: C/O Williams Giles Accountants, Conqueror Court, Sittingbourne, Kent, England, ME10 5BH
- Website: schoolscompanytrust.com

The SchoolsCompany Trust was a multi-academy trust with academies in Devon and Kent. It was closed in June 2018.

During its existence it was subjected to multiple criticisms: financial irregularities, mis-reporting of attendance, and safeguarding issues in Keystage 4 and Keystage 2.

== Schools ==
- Central Devon Academy
- Goodwin Academy
