= Michael Lattke =

German religious scholar (1942–2023)

Michael Stephan Lattke (12 May 1942 – 19 February 2023) was a German scholar of the New Testament and early Christianity.

== Life ==
Lattke was born on 12 May 1942 in Stettin, Germany (now Szczecin in Poland). He was brought up in Solingen and, after attending the Volksschule Wittkuller Straße and Humboldt-Gymnasium before completing his Abitur at Gymnasium Schwertstraße, studied at Bonn, Tübingen, Münster, Augsburg and Munich. In spite of his Roman Catholic background, at Tübingen he also studied Protestant theology, especially under the leading Protestant New Testament scholar Ernst Käsemann. He received the Dipl.-Theol. from Tübingen in 1968, the Dr. theol. from Freiburg im Breisgau in 1974, and the Dr. theol. habil. from Augsburg in 1979.

In 1981 Lattke settled in Brisbane, Australia, and began teaching at The University of Queensland, where he also received a D.Litt. in 1992. In 1994 he became professor of New Testament and Early Christianity Studies, and in 1997 he became a senior research fellow of the Australian Research Council. In October 2007, he became emeritus professor at The University of Queensland.

Lattke has published widely on the New Testament, early Christianity, early Judaism, early Christian hymns, and Gnosticism, and he has established himself as the world's foremost authority on the pseudepigraphical Odes of Solomon. In his comprehensive study of the Odes of Solomon, he has argued that the Odes were written originally in Greek. His commentary on the Odes has been translated into English by Marianne Ehrhardt for the Hermeneia series (published 2009 by Fortress Press). He also wrote a commentary on the Apology of Aristides for the series "Kommentar zu frühchristlichen Apologeten" (published by Herder Verlag).

In 2001, the Australian Government awarded Lattke a Centenary Medal for his contribution to the field of early Christian studies. In 2007, he was presented with the Festschrift, I Sowed Fruits into Hearts (Odes Sol. 17:13): Festschrift for Professor Michael Lattke, edited by Pauline Allen, Majella Franzmann and Rick Strelan (Strathfield: St Pauls, 2007).

Lattke was a member of the Studiorum Novi Testamenti Societas (SNTS), a life member of the Society for the Study of Early Christianity (SSEC), and an Honorary Fellow in the Centre for Early Christian Studies at the Australian Catholic University (ACU). The University of Queensland has offered the Michael Lattke Studies in Religion Scholarship since 2020.

Lattke died on 19 February 2023 in Brisbane.

== Work ==
A comprehensive bibliography of Lattke's work is compiled in the Festschrift: I Sowed Fruits into Hearts (Odes Sol. 17:13): Festschrift for Professor Michael Lattke, ed. Pauline Allen, Majella Franzmann and Rick Strelan (2007).

- Einheit im Wort: Die spezifische Bedeutung von ἀγάπη, ἀγαπᾶν und φιλεῖν im Johannesevangelium (München: Kösel-Verlag, 1975), originally presented as the author's Dr. theol. thesis, Freiburg im Breisgau (1974).
- Die Oden Salomos in ihrer Bedeutung für Neues Testament und Gnosis, 4 vols. in 5 (1979–98).
- Register zu Rudolf Bultmanns Glauben und Verstehen, Band I-IV (1984).
- Hymnus: Materialien zu einer Geschichte der antiken Hymnologie (1991).
- Collected Studies in Early Judaism, the New Testament and the Odes of Solomon (1974-1991), (1992) University of Queensland D.Litt. thesis.
- Oden Salomos (1995).
- Herbert Leroy, Jesus: Überlieferung und Deutung, 3rd edition (1999), edited with an introduction and bibliography by Anne Dawson and Michael Lattke.
- Oden Salomos: Text, Übersetzung, Kommentar, 3 vols. (1999-2005).
- "Die Oden Salomos: Einleitungsfragen und Forschungsgeschichte", Zeitschrift für die neutestamentliche Wissenschaft 98 (2007) 277-307.
- "War der Apologet Aristides ein Mann von Bildung?", in Frühchristentum und Kultur, ed. Ferdinand R. Prostmeier (2007) 35-74.
- "Druckfehler, Ergänzungen und Verbesserungen im Kommentar zu den Oden Salomos".
- "Greek Words in the Syriac Text of the Apology of Aristides", in Malphono w-Rabo d-Malphone: Studies in Honor of Sebastian P. Brock, ed. George A. Kiraz (2008) 383-403.
- Odes of Solomon: A Commentary, Translated by Marianne Ehrhardt, Edited by Harold W. Attridge (Hermeneia; Minneapolis: Fortress, 2009).
- "Spuren des Römerbriefs in den Oden Salomos", in The Letter to the Romans, ed. Udo Schnelle (2009) 543-562.
- "Der Tod Jesu Christi in der Apologie des Aristides. Eine Fallstudie mit forschungsgeschichtlicher Einleitung und Bibliographie", Early Christianity 1 (2010) 575-601.
- Die Oden Salomos: Griechisch-koptisch-syrisch mit deutscher Übersetzung (Darmstadt: WBG, 2011).
- ""Taufe" und "untertauchen" in Aphrahats ܬܚܘܝܬܐ (taḥwyāṯā)”, in Ablution, Initiation, and Baptism: Late Antiquity, Early Judaism, and Early Christianity = Waschungen, Initiation und Taufe: Spätantike, Frühes Judentum und Frühes Christentum, ed. David Hellholm, Tor Vegge, Øyvind Norderval, Christer Hellholm (BZNW 176/I–III; Berlin/Boston: De Gruyter, 2011) 1115–38.
- "Eine bemerkenswerte syrische Lesart in Mk 14,25", Zeitschrift für die neutestamentliche Wissenschaft 104 (2013) 146.
- Paul Anton de Lagarde und das Judentum (E-Book; St Lucia: The University of Queensland, 2014), 152 pp.
- "Einsetzung und Vollzug der christlichen Paschafeier bei Aphrahat", in The Eucharist – Its Origins and Contexts: Sacred Meal, Communal Meal, Table Fellowship in Late Antiquity, Early Judaism, and Early Christianity, ed. David Hellholm and Dieter Sänger (WUNT 376/I–III; Tübingen: Mohr Siebeck, 2017) 1091–1119.
- Aristides ›Apologie‹ übersetzt und erklärt (Kommentar zu frühchristlichen Apologeten, Band 2; Freiburg, Basel, Wien: Herder, 2018).
