= Thinking School =

A Thinking School is an accreditation organised through the University of Exeter. Schools are noted for the use of thinking tools. Thinking schools are a fusion of work on cognitive development and the work on managing educational change in schools.

Thinking schools adopt two or more existing thinking strategies such as Feuerstein's theory of Structured Cognitive Modifiability, Lipman's Philosophy for Children, or De Bono's Six Hat Thinking. But Thinking schools must have the written backing of governors, management, ownership by the staff and to broadcast their adoption on the school website. They must appoint a senior manager to drive the changes. The problems are institutional and schools can slide back to a 'regurgitation of information by means of timed assessment tasks' approach.

The focus must embrace planning through lesson integration, assemblies, the reward system and the pastoral house system if one is in place. This develops and enhances the pupil/student's self confidence, increase motivation and ultimate academic achievement.

== Accreditation ==
It is a whole school process that starts with the planning.

- Thinking Skills
- Reflectional Questioning
- Visual Mapping
- Collaborative Networking
- Developing Dispositions
- Structuring the Environment

Accreditation is organised through the University of Exeter.

== Thinking tools ==
Thinking Tools and Strategies taught to and used by the students

- Thinking Maps
- Thinking Hats
- Thinkers’ Keys
- Habits of Mind
- CoRT Thinking Tools
  - Q-matrix
  - SMART targeting
  - Growth mindsets
- Philosophy for Children

They were worked up by Terry Heick in 2017 to describe strategies for classroom practice. These are not exclusive: there are many approaches one can use in the classroom with the aim of supporting the student.

=== Thinkers’ Keys ===
The Thinkers Keys consist of 20 strategies for generating intellectual rigour, and developing advanced learning strategies. These are usually shown as a set of twenty cards, which are divided into two groups:

- Critical /Organisational: perspectives, purpose, decisions, question, three whys, info, rubrics, action, consequences, reflection
- Creative /Innovative: improvements, brainstorming, predictions, in common, combination, BAR, initiative, brickwall, challenge, reverse
