= DMAN =

Planning tool in air traffic control

DMAN, also known as Departure Manager, is a planning tool developed to improve the departure flows at airports and increase the predictability. DMAN calculates the Target Take Off Times (TTOT) and the Target Startup Approval Times (TSAT) taking multiple constraints and preferences into account. As a result, the DMAN provides a planned departure flow with the goal to maintain an optimal throughput at the runway, reduce queuing at holding point and distribute the information to various stakeholders at the airport (i.e. the airline, ground handling and Air traffic control (ATC). EUROCONTROL have defined DMAN as:

"DMAN is a planning system to improve departure flows at airports by calculating the Target Take Off Time (TTOT) and Target Start-up Approval Time (TSAT) for each flight, taking multiple constraints and preferences into account."

== Benefits ==
The DMAN has several benefits which may vary depending on the local conditions at an airport. Generally the main benefits are:

=== Environmental ===
Reduced emissions since the Target Startup Approval Times (TSAT) from a DMAN calculation results in reduced queuing at the holding point at the runway. Aircraft can therefore reduce their overall taxi time from their gate/stand to their actual take off from the runway and minimise their fuel emissions.

=== Predictability ===
DMAN adds predictability to the departure flow resulting in optimised resource management for ground handling, airline operators etc. The DMAN builds upon the EUROCONTROL A-CDM process and is an enabler for improving the quality of the information shared by the stakeholders at the airport. By creating a stable departure sequence the different operators can plan their work more efficiently.

=== Reactivity ===
DMAN enables an improved reactivity of unforeseen events and can therefore reduce the negative impact of such an event (e.g. instantaneous runway closure due to suspected debris, weather changes etc.). By constantly monitoring and distributing information the DMAN can support the air traffic control (ATC) in an airport to make a new plan based on the current situation and quickly distribute the information to the different operators and stakeholders at the airport.

=== Safety ===
During peak hour operations the DMAN have shown a positive impact on ATC workload since the DMAN holds aircraft at gate and as a result reduces the amount of traffic taxiing simultaneously.
