= Holcombe Grammar School =

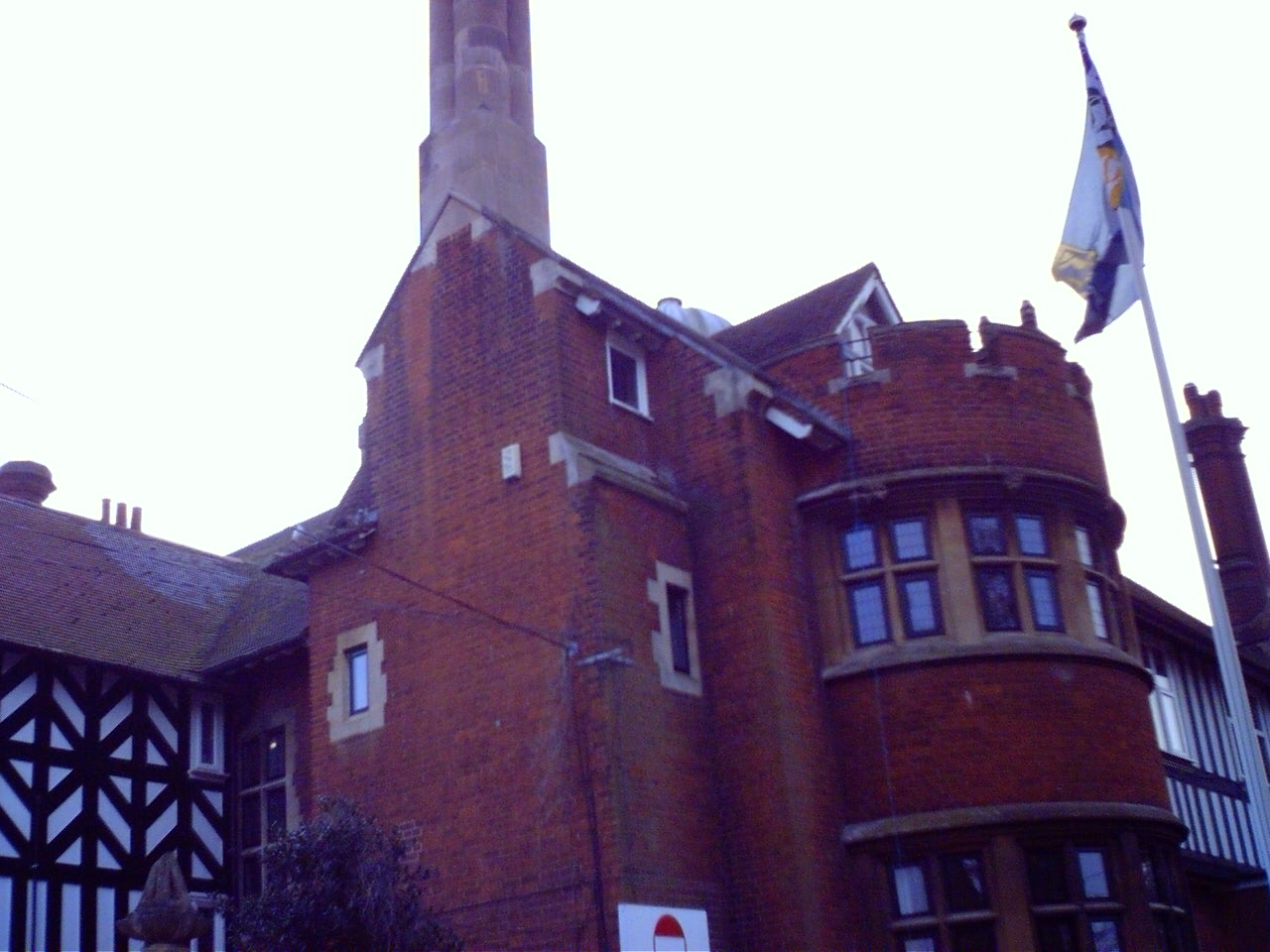

Location
- Maidstone Road; Chatham, Kent, ME4 6JB; England; 51.364895°N 0.520939°E

Information
- Former name: Chatham Grammar School for Boys
- Type: Grammar school Academy
- Motto: "Aspire and Achieve together"
- Established: 1913
- Trust: Thinking Schools Academy Trust
- Department for Education URN: 136594 Tables
- Ofsted: Reports
- Principal: Lee Preston
- Gender: Co - Educational Since 2026
- Age: 11 to 18
- Enrollment: 1079
- Houses: 6
- Website: www.holcombegrammar.org.uk

Holcombe Grammar School (formerly Chatham Grammar School for Boys) is a grammar school with academy status in Chatham, Kent, England. They are part of Thinking Schools Academy Trust. Holcombe is a selective school. From the 2017–18 academic year, the school planned to become co-educational and remain selective in the lower school. This was blocked – and later approved – by the Department for Education with co-educational admission desired for the 2018/19 school year. In September 2026, they will become mixed alongside Fort Pitt and Chatham Grammar, joining Rainham Mark as mixed grammar schools. The school has changed name in their advanced plans of becoming co-educational and plans to change all references from "Chatham Grammar School for Boys" to "Holcombe Grammar School" over academic year 2016/17.

== History ==
The school's history is believed to be from 1817, but its formal history began in 1913 with the establishment of Chatham Junior Technical School to train young men aged 13 – 16 for careers as artificers in the Royal Navy and in the Royal Dockyard School (later College) as engineers. The School evolved to become a centre of academic excellence as Chatham Grammar School for Boys, offering GCSE and A Levels as well as an Advanced Level Vocational Courses. The school moved to its current site in the 1920s, with its premises based around Holcombe Manor. After 1945 it became a specialist technical school (Chatham Technical School for Boys) and in 1982 it became a grammar school, Chatham Grammar School for Boys. In 2016 the school name was changed in preparation for the planned admission of girls throughout the school. After a consultation with pupils, staff and parents the name "Holcombe Grammar School" was selected. The local authority is now using this name.

== Ofsted reports ==
In September 2013 Ofsted delivered a report on their inspection carried out the previous June. The leadership and management were judged to be "inadequate" and as a result the school was placed in special measures. The previous report (2012) stated that the school was satisfactory, specifically because "students' achievement and the quality of teaching are not consistently good or better in all areas". English, in particular, was criticised as "although satisfactory, is slower than in other subjects". The 2013 report felt that the issues "have not been tackled effectively" and emphasised that the quality of teaching had not "improved quickly enough" Following a 2014 report the school has now been judged as being "Good" in all categories.

== Organisation ==
The pastoral structure of the school is based on three sections: Lower School (Years 7 and 8), Middle School (Years 9, 10 and 11), and the Sixth Form (Years 12 and 13).

The School Captains Team currently consists of eleven members of the sixth form. The Team consists of a Head Boy, a Head Girl, three Deputy School Captains and six School Captains, who serve from Christmas of Year 12 until the following Christmas of Year 13, or in effect, a calendar year. There are also approximately 50 prefects led by the Head Prefect, who is one of the eleven members of the School Captains Team, along with several senior prefects. Another one of the School Captains is the House Captain and is responsible for overseeing house events within the School as well as organising the events the students take part in outside of school

As of the 2026 year, “Music Prefects” Have been introduced to the school. These prefects are chosen based on students that strive to learn an instrument, or achieve exceptionally high grades in classes.

=== Houses ===
There are currently six school houses, which are named after ships constructed at the historic Chatham Dockyard located nearby.

The form ‘Phoenix’ was added for the 2025-2026 academic year.

- Guardian
- Shannon
- Conquest
- Barfleur
- Ardent
- Phoenix

Prior to the change of the school name, there were six school houses, also named after ships constructed at the nearby Chatham Dockyard:

- Achilles
- Blake
- Challenger
- Dryad
- Expedition
- Formidable

The houses compete against each other at events like the school's annual summer Sports Day, the autumn Cross Country, sports events such as rugby and hockey, and also at tasks like collecting the most 'rewards'. Ardent was called Hawkins before 2020, when Admiral John Hawkins's connection to the slave trade was highlighted; the school researched other more suitable Chatham-built ships and the students chose the name Ardent.

== Buildings ==
The school comprises several buildings, most notably the former Holcombe Manor. This was extended, replacing the conservatories, then expanded further with the construction of the atrium block, which currently houses the English faculty, opened in February 1997.

During the academic year 2001/2002 the school was extended out and up from the old Manor to facilitate English, Drama, Psychology and Music, as old mobile classrooms were removed from the site for refurbishment and a lease renewal.

In 2002 construction on a new Maths block ("M") began. The work was completed in August to be unveiled in the new academic year 2002/2003. This building houses one large first floor room used as an exam room and Sixth Form study area.

In December 2006 new accommodation for art students was finally ready and opened by local artist Billy Childish. Consisting of a Skylab-style structure, it was built on stilts above the existing design technology ("D") block, and includes a disabled lift, the first in the school.

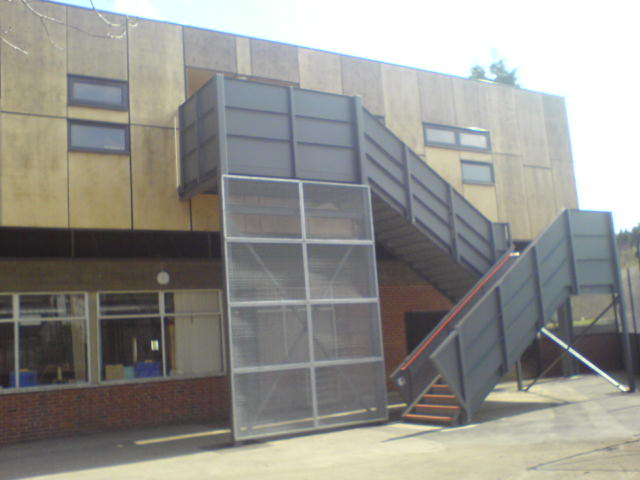
The new art block, and below, the DT block

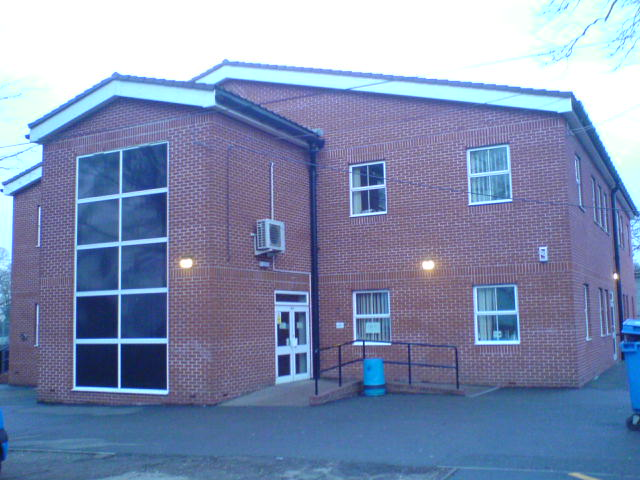
M block

== Former pupils ==
- Stel Pavlou, author, screenwriter
- Chris Smalling, footballer

== See also ==
- Gymnasium Schwertstraße Solingen that did pupil exchange visits in 1930
