= Majella Franzmann =

Professor and Fellow of the Australian Academy of the Humanities (FAHA)

- Born: 1952 (age 73–74)
- Occupations: academic, professor

Academic background
- Thesis: An Analysis of the Poetical Structure and Form of the Odes of Solomon (1990)

Academic work
- Discipline: Religious Studies
- Institutions: University of Sydney

Majella Franzmann is a professor in the Department of Studies in Religion at the University of Sydney and a Fellow of the Australian Academy of the Humanities (FAHA).

== Early life and education ==
Majella Maria Franzmann was born in 1952.

Franzmann completed her PhD at the University of Queensland in 1990 in the School of History, Philosophy, Religion and Classics. The title of her thesis was "An analysis of the poetical structure and form of the Odes of Solomon". While Franzmann was working on her doctorate, she also spent time at the University of Tübingen on a German Academic Exchange Service (DAAD) scholarship. After completion her doctorate, she was the recipient of a Humboldt Fellowship from 1992 to 1993. She renewed her Fellowship in 1995 and 2007.

== Career ==
Franzmann was Associate Dean (Research) and Chair of the Academic Board at the University of New England from 2004 to 2006. From 2008 to early 2010, she served as Pro Vice-Chancellor Humanities and Professor of Religious Studies at the University of Otago in New Zealand. She then returned to Australia to take up the position of Pro-Vice Chancellor Humanities at Curtin University from 2010 to 2015. Franzmann is now an Honorary Professor in the Department of Studies in Religion at the University of Sydney.

Franzmann was elected a Fellow of the Australian Academy of the Humanities in 2001 in the Classical Studies/Religion Section.

In 2001, Franzmann was awarded the Australian Centenary Medal for services to Australian society and the humanities in philosophy and religion.

In 2013, Franzmann was elected as a member of the Australian Council of Learned Academies for a three-year term.

Franzmann serves on the editorial board of the international journal published by Brill, Gnosis: Journal of Gnostic Studies.

== Honours ==
In 2006, the Australian Association for the Study of Religion (AASR) Women's Caucus invited Franzmann to give the annual Penny Magee Memorial Lecture. The title of her talk was, "Tehat the Weaver: Women's Experience in Manichaeism in Fourth-century Roman Kellis".

== Publications ==
=== Books ===
- Franzmann, Majella. (2003) Jesus in the Manichaean Writings, New York: T. & T. Clark. ISBN 9780567504142
- Franzmann, Majella. (2000) Women and religion, Oxford University Press, New York. ISBN 9780195107739

=== Edited books ===
- Gardner, I., Lieu, S., Eccles, L., Franzmann, M., Parry, K. (2012). Medieval Christian and Manichaean Remains from Quanzhou (Zayton). Turnhout, Belgium: Brepols Publishers. ISBN 978-2-503-52197-8

=== Book chapters ===
- Franzmann, M. (2019). Gender issues in the study of ancient Gnosticism. In Garry W. Trompf, Gunner B. Mikkelsen, Jay Johnston (Eds.), The Gnostic World, (pp. 118–123). Abingdon: Routledge.
- Franzmann, M., Gardner, I., Parry, K. (2012). The Indian Background: Connections and Comparisons. In S. N.C. Lieu, L. Eccles, M. Franzmann, I. Gardner, K. Parry (Eds.), Medieval Christian and Manichaean Remains from Quanzhou (Zayton), (pp. 215–242). Turnhout, Belgium: Brepols Publishers. ISBN 978-2-503-52197-8
- Franzmann, M. (2010). Gnostic Portraits of Jesus. In Delbert Burkett (Eds.), The Blackwell Companion to Jesus, (pp. 160–175). Chicester, United Kingdom: Louisiana State University Press. doi:10.1002/9781444327946.ch11

=== Journals ===
- Franzmann, M. (2015). The epitaph of Mar Solomon, bishop of south China, administrator of Manicheans and Nestorians. Open Theology, 1(1), 293–300. doi:10.1515/opth-2015-0014
- Bennett, D., Franzmann, M. (2013). Aristotle and the ERA: Measuring the immeasurable. Arts and Humanities in Higher Education, 12(4), 367–381. doi:10.1177/1474022213492441
- Franzmann, M. (2013). Augustine's view of Manichaean almsgiving and almsgiving by the Manichaean community at Kellis. Hervormde Teologiese Studies, 69(1). doi:10.4102/hts.v69i1.1356
- Franzmann, M. (2012). Personal and cosmic spaces of salvation in James and the Gospel of Judas. Rivista di Storia e Letteratura Religiosa, 48(1), 155–166.
- Franzmann, M. (2011). The treasure of the Manichaean spiritual life. Nag Hammadi and Manichaean Studies, 74, 235–243. doi:10.1163/ej.9789004189973.i-730.67
- Franzmann, M. (2010). 'God desires ease for you, and desires not hardship for you': A comparison of qur'anic and Judaeo-Christian law. Islam and Christian-Muslim Relations, 21(1), 1–9. doi:10.1080/09596410903481812
- Franzmann, M. (2009). Imitatio Christi: Copying the death of the founder and gaining paradise. Journal for the Study of Judaism. Supplement, 132, 367–383. doi:10.1163/ej.9789004173552.i-622.105
- Franzmann, M. (2008). Reading James and the Gospel of Judas in Codex Tchachos: The relationship of texts and their characters in a common codex. Rivista di Storia e Letteratura Religiosa, 44(3), 543–552.
- Franzmann, M., Gardner, I., Lieu, S. (2005). A living Mani cult in the Twenty-first century. Rivista di Storia e Letteratura Religiosa, 41(1), vii-x1.

=== Edited journals ===
- Franzmann, M. (2022). Papers from the International Symposium on Women in Manichaeism, Sorbonne 2014. Nag Hammadi and Manichaean Studies. ISBN 9004472215
