= 25 Magazine =

25 Magazine was an urban arts, entertainment and culture magazine headquartered in Washington, D.C.

== History ==
In January 2008, the magazine launched online as The Grind Magazine and covered careers, student life, entertainment, social issues and academics but later relaunched and rebranded in August 2008 as 25 Magazine, refocusing its content to cater to a niche audience of young urban professionals in metropolitan cities.

== Awards ==
In September 2009, 25 Magazine was the recipient of the "popular vote" award in the 2009 Black Weblog Awards in the "Best Post Series" category for their "Starving Artists" feature series which at the time featured artists U-N-I, Tanya Morgan, Gangsta L. Crisis, and producer and video blogger, Jabari Johnson.
