= Cultural impact of Beyoncé =

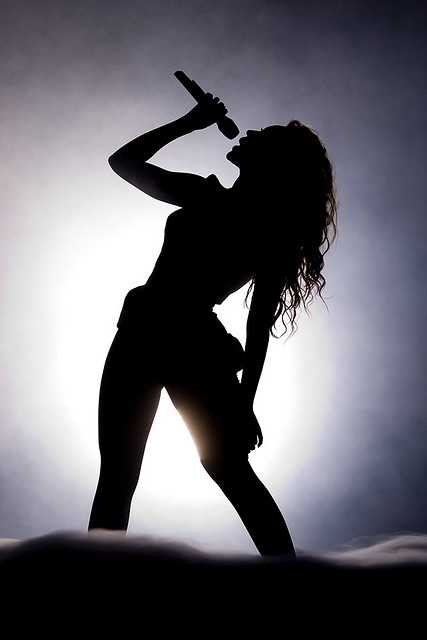
Beyoncé performing in Lisbon on her I Am... World Tour in 2009

Through her music, visuals, performances, public image, political engagement, and lifestyle, American singer-songwriter Beyoncé has had a significant impact on popular culture. She has received widespread acclaim and numerous accolades throughout her career, becoming one of the best-selling and most-awarded music artists of all time. Publications and academics widely regard Beyoncé as one of the most culturally significant figures of the 21st century and one of the greatest entertainers of all time.

Beyoncé has revolutionized the music industry, transforming the production, distribution, promotion, and consumption of music. She has been credited with reviving both the album and the music video as art forms, popularizing surprise albums and visual albums, and changing the Global Release Day to Friday. Her artistic innovations, such as staccato rap-singing and vocal manipulation techniques, including chopping and re-pitching, have become defining features of popular music within the 21st century. With her work frequently transcending traditional genre boundaries, Beyoncé has created new artistic standards that have shaped contemporary music, helped to renew subgenres of R&B, hip-hop, country, dance, and house, and brought Afrobeats to a global audience. Beyoncé has been recognized as setting the playbook for music artists in the modern era, with musicians from across genres, generations and countries citing her as a major influence on their career.

Beyond entertainment, Beyoncé has had a significant impact on socio-political matters. Her work celebrates women's empowerment and Black culture, while highlighting systemic inequalities and advocating for social justice. Through her music, public statements, and philanthropy, she has become a prominent voice in political conversations, with cultural critics crediting her with influencing political elections and mainstreaming sociocultural movements such as fourth-wave feminism and Black Lives Matter. Beyoncé's work and career is the subject of numerous university courses, cultural analyses and museum exhibitions around the world. Through the "Beyoncé Effect", she has ignited market trends and boosted the economies of various countries.

== Musical influence ==
=== Vocal impact ===
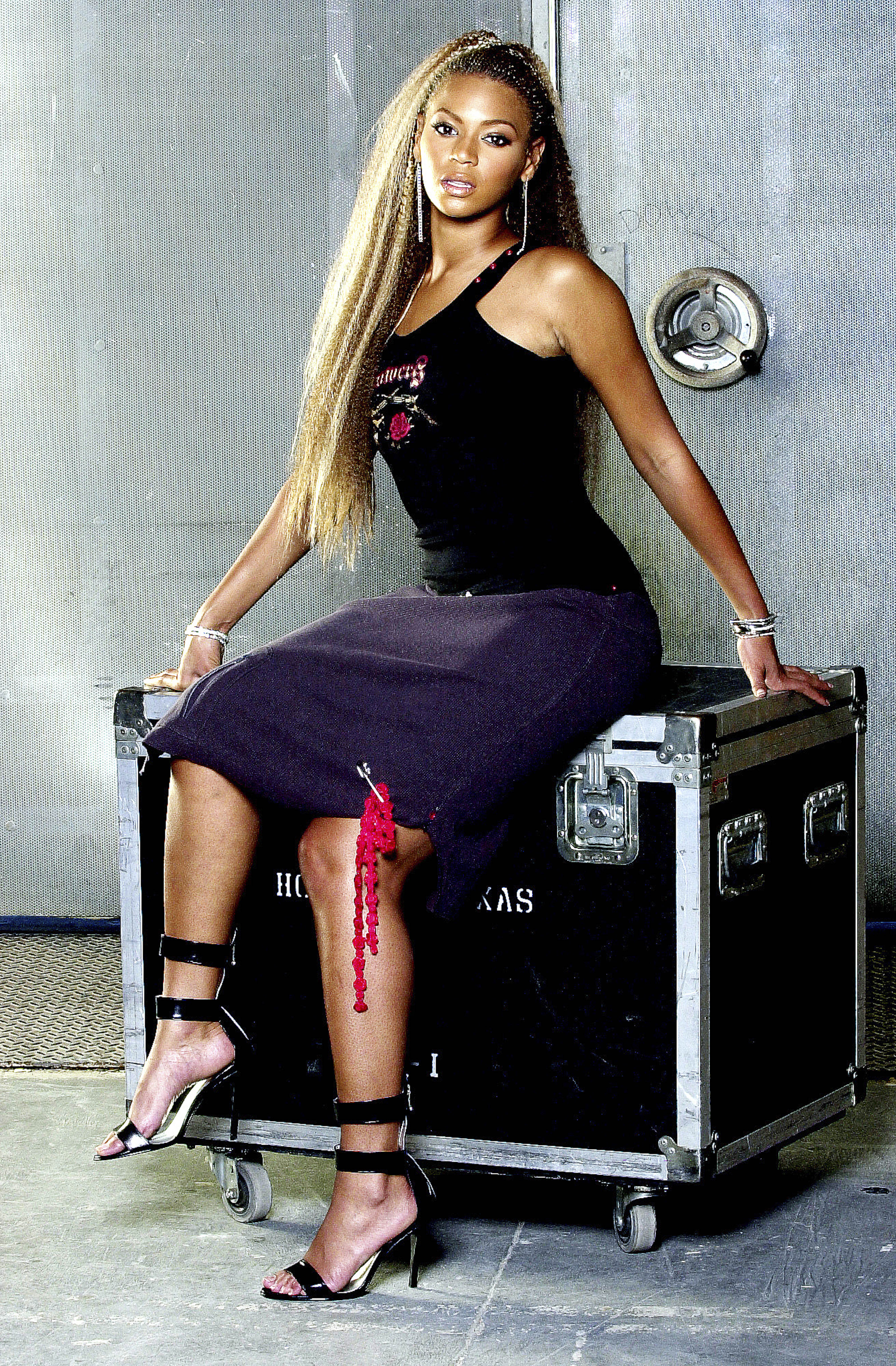
The staccato rap-singing style pioneered by Beyoncé in the late 1990s became a staple of 21st century music.

Beyoncé is largely credited by music critics for the invention of the staccato rap-singing style that has become popular in pop, R&B, and rap music. After Beyoncé first demonstrated staccato rap-singing throughout Destiny's Child's The Writing's on the Wall (1999), the style began dominating the music industry in the 2000s, becoming popular across contemporary R&B. The staccato rap-singing style continued to dominate the music industry throughout the 2010s and 2020s, paving the way for singing and rap to collide in novel ways.

The style was frequently implemented by many hip-hop artists including Drake and Kanye West, and it also "redefined the sound of pop radio", according to journalist David Opie, with usage by singers such as Taylor Swift, Miley Cyrus and Fergie. The phenomenon of mumble rappers, who saw widespread success in the late 2010s, also utilized the staccato rap-inflected vocal style cadence. American academic Michael Eric Dyson stated that Beyoncé "changed the whole genre" with the proliferation of rap-singing, adding: "She doesn't get credit for the remarkable way in which she changed the musical vocabulary of contemporary art."

The practice of chopping a vocal sample and re-pitching it to create a melody was brought into the mainstream by Beyoncé on "Run the World (Girls)", which sampled Major Lazer's "Pon de Floor". This helped chopped and re-pitched vocals take over popular music, being featured in songs such as Jack Ü and Justin Bieber's "Where Are Ü Now", Major Lazer's "Lean On", and DJ Snake and Lil Jon's "Turn Down for What". The practice became a prominent sound of 2010s music, with one-fifth of songs on the Billboard Hot 100 in 2016 featuring chopped and re-pitched vocals.

=== Genre boundaries ===
Beyoncé's music often moves between diverse musical styles, which has helped other artists to transcend genres. Music journalist Taylor Crumpton explained that Beyoncé ushered in a post-genre age by helping break down previously-rigid genre boundaries and enabling artists to explore musical styles in a fluid manner. Ann Powers of NPR said that Beyoncé's work has led the industry to a moment of "post-genre", while Robin Hilton viewed Beyoncé's blending of genres as having encouraged other artists to refuse to be confined to genre boundaries, "like she was setting out this table for and welcoming everybody to it". Aaron Williams of Uproxx wrote that Beyoncé's music cannot be confined to individual genres, adding: "At this point, Beyoncé is a genre."

In an article for NPR, Kiana Fitzgerald wrote that Beyoncé reclaimed the genres of rock and country, which originated from Black people. Brittany Spanos for Rolling Stone wrote that Beyoncé's reclamation of rock "is giving the genre a second life – and maybe what can save it". Upon release, Renaissance sparked conversations and essays on the history of dance music and its roots in Black culture, as did Cowboy Carter with country music.

==== Hip-hop revival ====
Beyoncé is credited with leading the revival of hip-hop in the 2000s. In the late 1990s and early 2000s, Eurodance became an increasingly popular musical genre, with international hits from artists such as Eiffel 65, Aqua and Scatman John. Other artists saw significant commercial success from Europop-inspired releases, such as the Spice Girls, Backstreet Boys and Take That.

In 2003, Beyoncé bucked this trend with the release of her debut album Dangerously In Love, which blended R&B with hip-hop and soul. As Dangerously In Love increased in popularity, Beyoncé helped to move popular music away from the Europop-sound and towards funk- and hip-hop-based music, according to Billboard. This aided the commercialization of hip-hop as a genre, and the infusion of hip-hop influences in mainstream pop. As a result, the Billboard charts became dominated by urban music, with all songs that topped the Hot 100 chart in 2004 being performed by Black artists.

==== R&B revival ====
Beyoncé is credited with leading the revival of R&B in the 2010s. In the early 2010s, popular music was dominated by EDM. EDM artists such as David Guetta, Calvin Harris and Skrillex found widespread success, while mainstream artists (such as Rihanna, Taylor Swift, Lady Gaga, Usher, Chris Brown and Nicki Minaj) forwent pop and R&B in favor of EDM-inspired sounds. According to CKWR-FM host and music director Steve Sobczuk, rhythmic radio had lost some of its agenda-setting power, with fewer R&B artists crossing over to Top 40 radio and Black artists not seeing the same commercial success as they had in the 2000s. A crisis ensued in the R&B field, with demand for R&B songwriters reaching an all-time low as record labels focused on EDM and dance music.

In 2011, Beyoncé released her album 4, which blended R&B and soul music from the '70, '80s and '90s. This helped to re-establish R&B as a mainstream concern, ultimately aiding an "R&B comeback". According to Billboard, Beyoncé remained a stalwart of R&B and hip-hop in the late '00s and early '10s, which meant that mainstream radio wanted to follow her lead when she released new music. Additionally, the R&B songwriters who received a co-sign from Beyoncé utilized her endorsement to demand the attention of publishers and A&Rs, ultimately securing successful publishing deals and becoming leading songwriters in the industry.

==== Country music revival ====
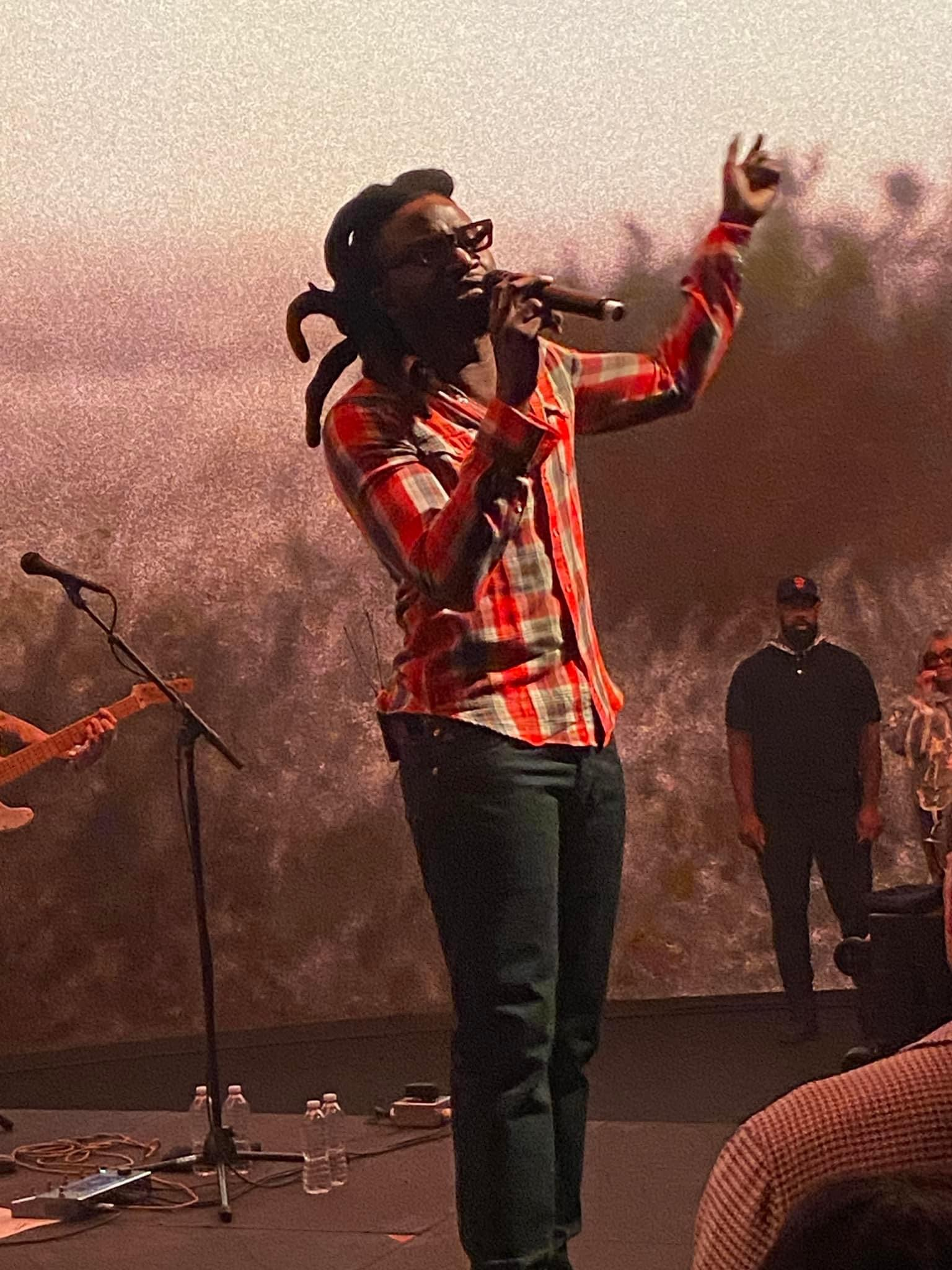
Beyoncé has boosted the careers of rising musicians such as Shaboozey, helping "A Bar Song (Tipsy)" become the longest-running number-one song in Billboard Hot 100 history.

Beyoncé is credited with leading the revival of country music in the 2020s. She increased public interest in the genre and made it more accessible to new audiences, with publications writing that Beyoncé triggered "a cultural shift", "a watershed moment" and "a tipping point" in the genre's history. The release of Cowboy Carter was credited by The Times as making country music become mainstream in the UK, with one survey finding that 60% of British respondents started listening to country music following the release of Cowboy Carter. A worldwide study found that over one-third of Gen Z respondents began listening to country music after Beyoncé entered the genre. There was a 38% increase in views of country music videos globally on Vevo following the album's release, as well as a 40% increase in Black 18–34 year olds listening to country radio. Cowboy Carter was said to redefine what it means to be a country artist, with Emi Tuyetnhi Tran from NBC News commenting that it will "open the floodgates" for other country musicians. Cowboy Carter sparked discourse on the boundaries of the country music genre and its roots within Black music, and drove cultural conversations on the inclusion of Black artists within the genre. (Note: Supported by multiple sources:)

Beyoncé boosted the careers of rising country acts. The listenership of Black female country musicians skyrocketed following the release of Cowboy Carter; for instance, Linda Martell, who was the first commercially successful Black female country artist, saw a 127,430 percent increase in streams. In The Tennessean, Andrea Williams wrote that Beyoncé opened the door for others in country music, proving Black songwriters, producers, and musicians belong in the genre. NPR's Amanda Marie Martínez wrote that the album revealed the "strong demand" for country music made by Black artists and a "growing community" of Black country fans. After featuring on the album, Shaboozey advanced the release of his single "A Bar Song (Tipsy)" to take advantage of his increased visibility. The song would peak at number one on the Billboard Hot 100 and Billboard Hot Country Songs, replacing Beyoncé's own "Texas Hold 'Em" and becoming the first time in history that two Black artists led the latter chart back to back; the song later tied the record for longest-running number-one song on the Billboard Hot 100 history. Shaboozey thanked Beyoncé for "changing [his] life" and "opening a door for us".

==== Popularization of afrobeats worldwide ====
Beyoncé is credited with helping popularize African music (most notably afrobeats) globally in the late 2010s. Historically, Afrobeats music had not found mainstream success in the U.S., with African artists' attempts at breaking into the market repeatedly being thwarted. In 2019, Beyoncé released The Lion King: The Gift, which featured numerous African musicians. The album was described as an "unprecedented" tipping-point moment for the global exposure of African music by the London School of Economics, with several featured artists receiving significant career boosts and African music being promoted to the forefront of global popular culture. Rolling Stone, Billboard and Bloomberg credited Beyoncé with boosting the awareness and popularity of Afrobeats within the global music industry, ultimately leading to the establishment of the Billboard U.S. Afrobeats Songs chart and African music becoming increasingly mainstream in American culture.

== Music industry influence ==
=== Surprise albums ===
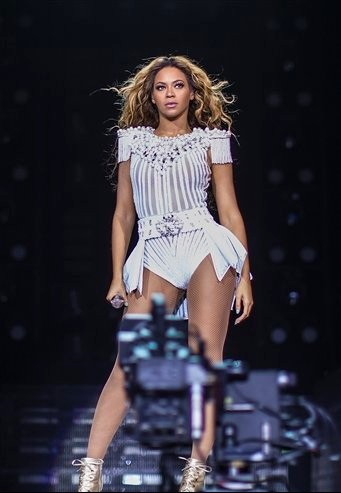
Beyoncé transformed how music is released through the invention of the surprise album in 2013.

Beyoncé is widely credited with the invention of the surprise album, which revolutionized how music is released and marketed in the 21st century. Prior to Beyoncé's innovation, music releases were typically formulaic, with a lead single, release date announcement and a traditional marketing campaign. On December 13, 2013, Beyoncé released her 2013 eponymous album with no announcement, singles or promotion. This move, which has been termed 'pulling a Beyoncé', was "arguably the single most pivotal moment in all of 21st-century pop music" according to Billboard, with Beyoncé reorienting the music market to unconventional promotional rollouts.

In an article for Teen Vogue, Philip Henry explained how Beyoncé's 2013 album "raised the bar for what we consumers expect", describing it as "one of the most important moments in music". Many artists would go on to adopt surprise rollouts, such as Drake, Taylor Swift, Frank Ocean, Rihanna and J. Cole, with MTV's Hilary Hughes writing in 2021 that "seven years after Beyoncé's arrival, its ripple effect across the industry is undeniable". The Guardian's Peter Robinson explained how Beyoncé "reinvented how to release an album", putting excitement back into the music industry. Robinson added that Beyoncé's release acts as "a masterclass in both exerting and relinquishing control", showing other artists how to effectively make a comeback. Brands outside of music, such as Nike and Apple, also began to do surprise releases, providing products direct-to-consumers without prior announcements.

=== Unconventional releases ===
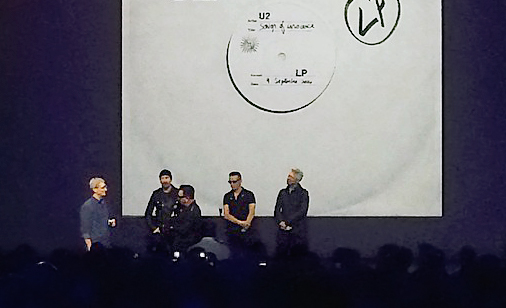
Beyoncé shifted the industry towards unconventional music releases, such as U2 and Apple's move to automatically add Songs of Innocence (2014) to all iTunes libraries.

Artists were also inspired by Beyoncé to attempt to create album releases that were unique cultural moments, such as U2's Songs of Innocence (2014), which was automatically added to the iTunes libraries of 500 million users, triggering unprompted downloads on many users' Apple devices. Beyoncé's marketing method has continued to inspire other artists to implement unconventional strategies, with artists seeking success by releasing songs without traditional promotion, such as Ariana Grande's "Thank U, Next". P. Claire Dodson of Fast Company wrote that with Lemonade, Beyoncé further transformed "the way music is created, distributed, and promoted".

Peter Robinson of The Guardian wrote that the power of Beyoncé's popularization of the surprise release "shouldn't be underestimated", as it stopped music critics from having a "meaningful role in an album's release", enabled "a frictionless exchange of celebrity energy between fan and artist", and increased interest in album campaigns. Fully digital releases of music, without physical albums, became standard in the music industry due to Beyoncé. Beyoncé released her 2013 eponymous album exclusively on iTunes for its first week, which set the precedent for the decline of radio and physical copies in the 2010s.

Harvard Business School studied the surprise release of Beyoncé in a case study authored by professors Anita Elberse and Stacie Smith. The study explores the marketing strategy that Beyoncé used and its place in the current music industry. Beyoncé has been considered a pioneer in leveraging streaming exclusivity, creating a scarcity model in the music industry that increases the long-term value of releases.

=== Music videos ===
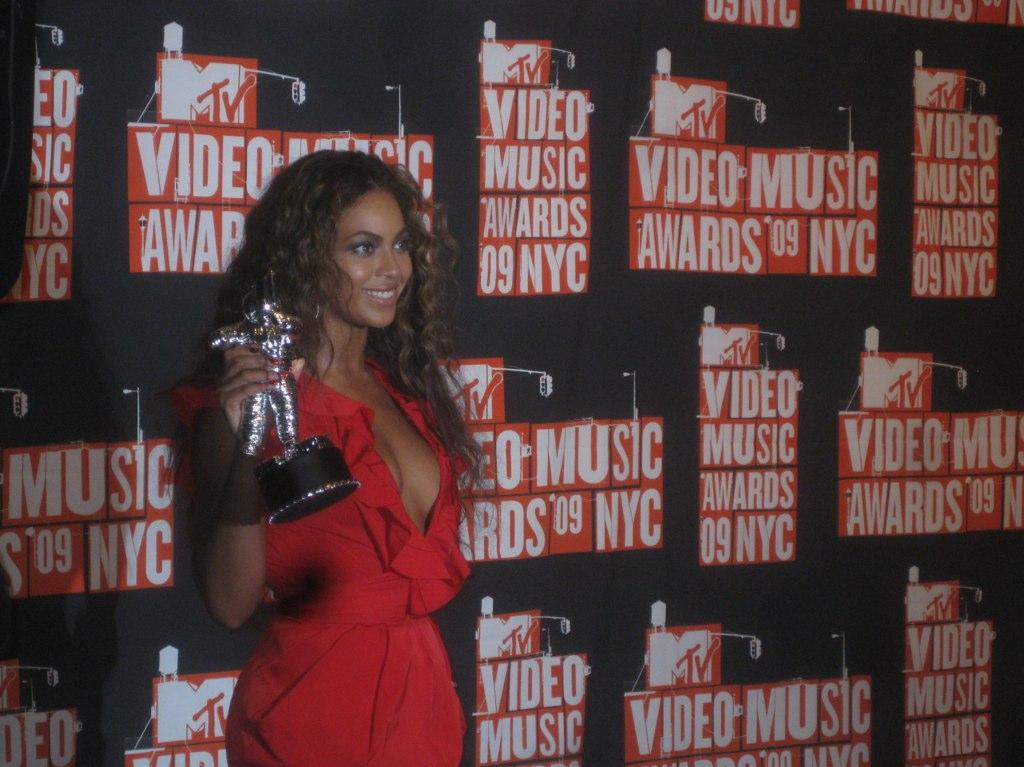
Beyoncé—who has won 30 MTV Video Music Awards—is credited with reviving music videos as an art form.

Beyoncé is credited with reviving the music video as an art form, with Rolling Stone writing that she is "almost singlehandedly keeping the art of the music video alive". Writing for Billboard, Andrew Unterberger explained how Beyoncé had been at the music video's forefront since 2003 and arguably since Destiny's Child, revived interest in the music video format (and resuscitated the MTV VMAs) with "Single Ladies (Put a Ring on It)", and restored relevance to the art form in the early 2010s, at a time where the concept of the music video was losing its relevancy. Unterberger wrote that she has since "evolved into unquestionably the brightest star of video" during the 2010s, creating the "exhilarating, artful and immaculate" Beyoncé and Lemonade visual albums "that became blockbuster releases equivalent to nearly any feature film released in either year".

In an article on the history of music videos for Crack Magazine, Simran Hans wrote that Beyoncé was an "early instigator" of the trend of implementing a dance craze into a music video with "Single Ladies (Put a Ring on It)". Hans added that the video also set the precedent for "the music video as meme genre", later adopted for songs such as Psy's "Gangnam Style", Miley Cyrus' "Wrecking Ball", and Drake's "Hotline Bling". Sonia Rao of The Washington Post credited Beyoncé with initiating the trend of using music videos to explore racial and sexual identity, citing Frank Ocean, Janelle Monáe and Donald Glover as examples of artists who followed the precedent that Beyoncé set.

=== Visual albums ===
Beyoncé is credited with the creation of the visual album. While there had been earlier examples of artists releasing music with visual counterparts, such as The Beatles' A Hard Day's Night (1964), Prince's Purple Rain (1984), and Beyoncé's own B'Day (2006), the term "visual album" was first used for Beyoncé's 2013 self-titled album to describe a release where the music and videos are designed to be consumed as a comprehensive and cohesive piece. Beyoncé continued to experiment with the format on Lemonade (2016) and Black Is King (2020).

Numerous popular musicians have followed Beyoncé's blueprint and created "high-concept mini-movies that can add artistic heft to projects", according to The New York Times. Artists' projects that have followed the precedent set by Beyoncé include Frank Ocean's Endless (2016), Drake's Please Forgive Me (2016), Janelle Monáe's Dirty Computer (2018), Lonely Island's The Unauthorized Bash Brothers Experience (2019), Thom Yorke's Anima (2019), Sturgill Simpson's Sound & Fury (2019), Kid Cudi's Entergalactic (2022), and Jennifer Lopez's This Is Me... Now: A Love Story (2024).

=== Album format ===
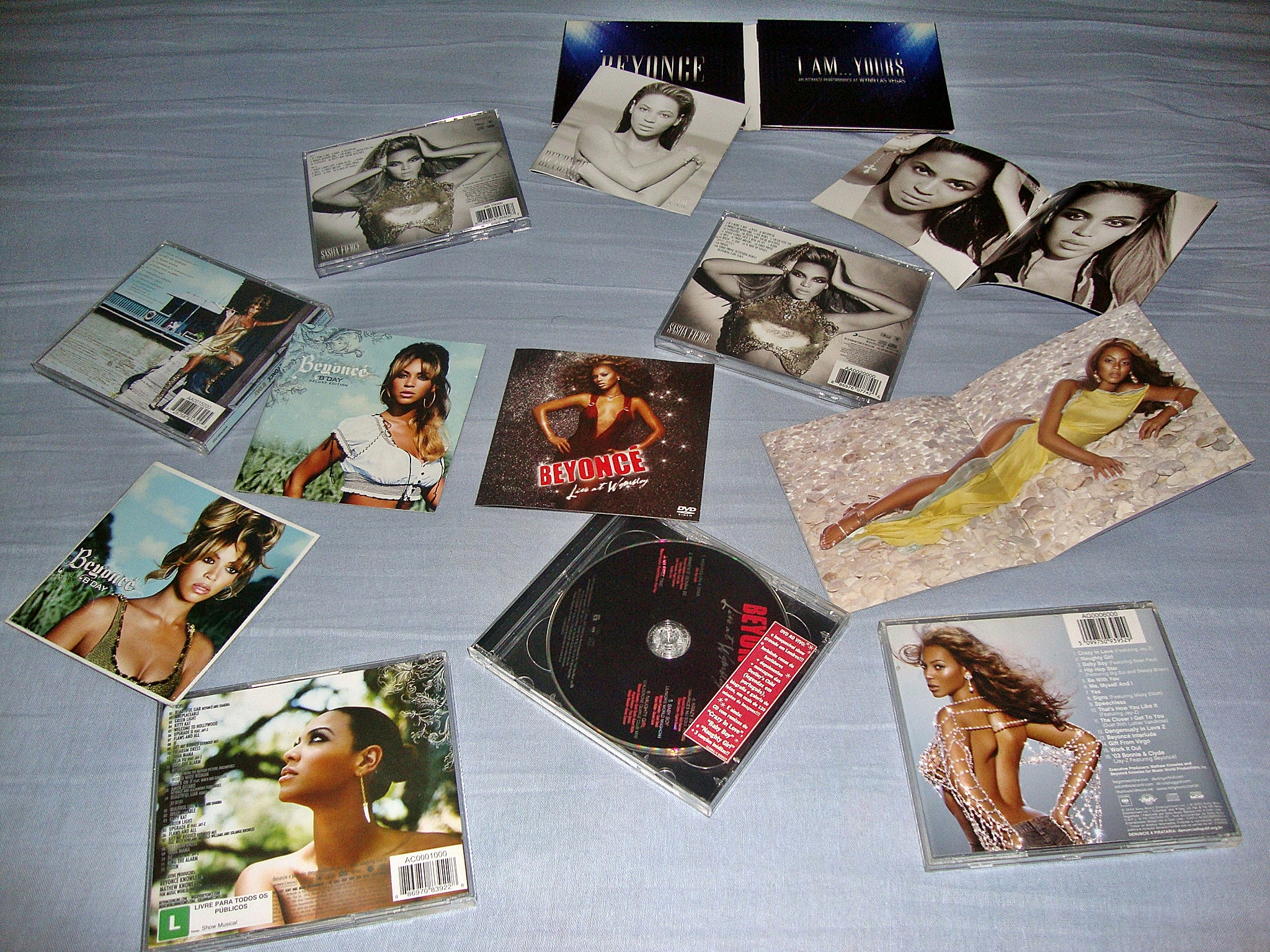
Beyoncé has been credited with reviving the album as an art form.

Beyoncé has been credited with reviving the album as an art form in an era dominated by singles and streaming. This started with her 2011 album 4; while mainstream R&B artists were forgoing albums-led R&B in favor of singles-led EDM, Beyoncé aimed to place the focus back on albums as an art form and re-establish R&B as a mainstream concern. This remained a focus of Beyoncé's, and in 2013, she made her eponymous album only available to purchase as a full album on iTunes, rather than being able to purchase individual tracks or consume the album via streaming. Kaitlin Menza of Marie Claire wrote that this made listeners "experience the album as one whole sonic experience, the way people used to, noting the musical and lyrical themes".

Jamieson Cox for The Verge described how Beyoncé's 2013 album initiated a gradual trend of albums becoming more cohesive and self-referential, and this phenomenon reached its endpoint with Lemonade, which set "a new standard for pop storytelling at the highest possible scale". Megan Carpentier of The Guardian wrote that with Lemonade, Beyoncé has "almost revived the album format" by releasing an album that can only be listened to in its entirety. Myf Warhurst on Double J's "Lunch With Myf" explained that while most artists' albums consist of a few singles plus filler songs, Beyoncé "brought the album back", changing the art form of the album "to a narrative with an arc and a story and you have to listen to the entire thing to get the concept".

=== Change of Global Release Day ===
Beyoncé is credited with the change of music release days from Tuesdays to Fridays. Until 2015, new music was released on Tuesdays in major markets such as the US and Canada, largely because the Billboard charts were published on Wednesday, and because retailers could prepare their stock ahead of the weekend. Smaller markets varied in their music release days, such as France and the UK where music was released on Mondays.

Beyoncé released her eponymous album on Friday, December 13, 2013, in a break with industry norms. The Friday release meant that fans across the world could experience the music at the same time, and new music on a Friday was seen as enabling listeners to enjoy the album over the weekend. This move set a trend of artists releasing their albums on Fridays. Due to increased piracy as a result of the rise of digital music and streaming, The International Federation of the Phonographic Industry (IFPI) decided to create a unified Global Release Day, on which music releases are made uniformly available around the world, to streamline global music consumption, minimize piracy, and create a culture-shaping moment each week. On June 11, 2015, the IFPI announced that the Global Release Day will be set for Fridays, known as New Music Fridays, as a result of the impact from Beyoncé's album.

=== Live performances ===
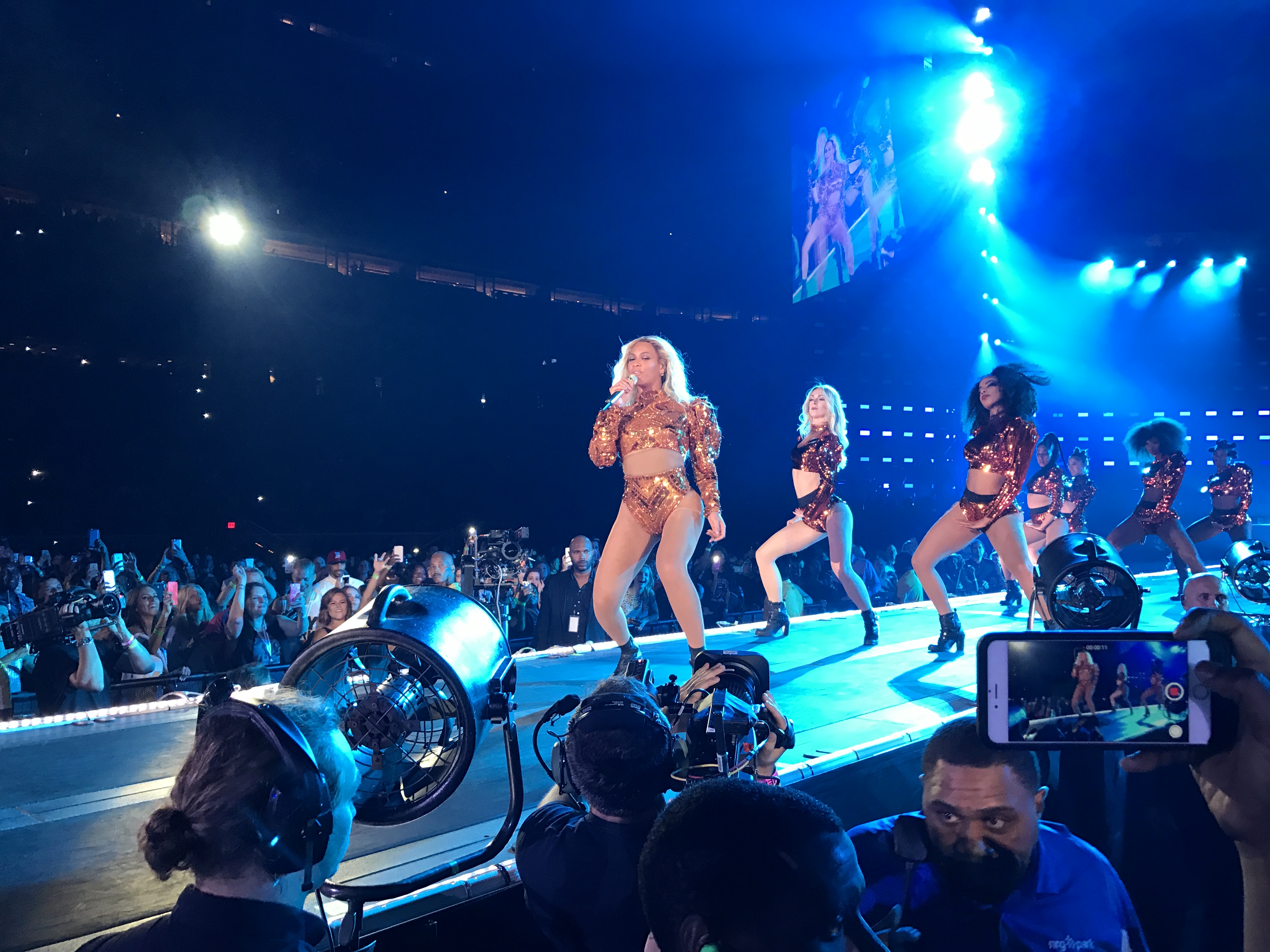
The Formation World Tour, which was announced without promotion or an associated album, was the first all-stadium tour by a female artist.

Beyoncé is considered to have set the standard for live performances in the 21st century. Revolt's Jon Powell said that "no artist has redefined the modern concert experience like Beyoncé", due to her innovative stage design, faultless vocal performance, energetic choreography, and use of story arcs reflected in the production. Kaniya Rogers of the same publication explained how several artists follow the blueprint set by Beyoncé and implement her signatures in their performances. This includes using costume changes to reinforce each track's narrative, alternating between solo spotlights and group choreography, incorporating fantasy elements in performances, and musical reinventions of songs.

Beyoncé helped concert tours become cultural events and artistic outputs in their own right, diverting from traditional promotional models where tours are merely seen as promotion for an album. Beyoncé became the first woman to headline an all-stadium tour in 2016 with The Formation World Tour. The tour was announced with no press run or traditional album rollout (Lemonade was surprise-released four days before the tour began), with all shows selling out and grossing $256 million from 49 shows. Beyoncé furthered this model with the Renaissance World Tour, in which she crafted an ultra-premium tour experience that became a cultural phenomenon and generated $580 million in revenue. Her Cowboy Carter Tour also became a cultural phenomenon and made over $407 million in revenue to become the highest-grossing country tour in history.

=== Concert films ===
Beyoncé is credited with turning concert films into cultural events and setting the blueprint for how artists can increase the long-term value of live performances. Beyoncé’s 2018’s Coachella headline performance was later immortalized in the 2019 Homecoming live album and concert film, the latter of which was part of a $60 million deal with Netflix. This extended the commercial lifespan of the performance and showed that one-off concerts could be multimedia properties. In subsequent years, artists such as Kendrick Lamar and Billie Eilish have utilized similar methods, turning live shows into long-term investments. Beyoncé also "proved [concert films] could be billion-dollar box office events", setting the standard for business moves in the industry by releasing Renaissance: A Film by Beyoncé directly in theaters through AMC, allowing Beyoncé to retain control over revenue and distribution.

=== Empowerment of artists ===
Time's Cady Lang wrote that Beyoncé's career moves have helped to "rewrite the playbook" for artists. Sidney Madden of NPR explained that Beyoncé's control over her work and career has set the tone for other artists. In an article for The Guardian, Tshepo Mokoena explained that by taking control of her career through Parkwood Entertainment, Beyoncé set the precedent for musicians, such as Janelle Monáe and Little Simz, to become more autonomous. Mokoena added that Beyoncé destroyed the idea of performers "just sticking to the music", instead leading a "creative revolution" that has allowed artists such as Kanye West, Donald Glover and Rihanna to explore new creative avenues and industries. Scarlett Harris wrote that Beyoncé has empowered artists to defy industry conventions and release their music in their intended manner, quoting Taylor Swift's re-recordings project. HuffPost's Daniel Welsh wrote that Beyoncé's forgoing of conventional promotional tactics, such as press interviews, has inspired other artists to take control of their own narrative, such as Rihanna and Taylor Swift. Beyoncé’s approach to music ownership has been a "masterclass in artist control", according to Jon Powell, renegotiating her Columbia Records deal in the 2000s to gain ownership of her masters, which enables her to dictate how her music is licensed, distributed and monetized.

=== Award shows ===
Beyoncé helped trigger conversations on genre boundaries and bias at the Grammy Awards. Historically, Black artists have been boxed into R&B and hip-hop categories, even when their work transcends those genres. The success of Renaissance in dance music and Cowboy Carter in country music helped shift the conversation, pushing the Recording Academy to rethink how it categorizes artists of color.

Beyoncé's work has influenced awards bodies to make significant rule changes, which have been met with both praise and criticism. After visual albums saw a rise in popularity following Beyoncé's use of the medium, MTV re-introduced the Breakthrough Long Form Video award for the first time in 25 years at the 2016 MTV Video Music Awards. After Lemonade and Black Is King both controversially lost the Grammy Award for Best Music Film to music documentaries, critics highlighted that the Recording Academy had a narrow view on music films and needed to adapt to the more contemporary approaches pioneered by artists such as Beyoncé. Consequently, in 2021, the Academy updated the eligibility criteria for the Best Music Film category, to include "individual music videos that together create a visual album (if videos are packaged and entered together as one cohesive film)", as a recognition of the validity of visual albums in the field.

Other Grammy rule changes have been seen as stemming from Recording Academy members' negative sentiments towards Beyoncé. In 2023, for the 65th Annual Grammy Awards, some Dance/Electronic screening committee members tried to remove Beyoncé's "Break My Soul" from the Best Dance/Electronic Recording category, claiming it was not legitimate dance music. This attempt was thwarted and the song ultimately won the award, prompting criticism from some dance musicians, including the committee's former chairman who questioned whether the song belonged in a pop category and thus whether the win was deserved. Four months later, the Academy created a new category titled Grammy Award for Best Dance Pop Recording, which the former chairman described as a move to segregate "traditional dance artists" and "commercial artists". Similarly, after Beyoncé became the first Black person to win Best Country Album (with Cowboy Carter at the 67th Annual Grammy Awards), the Recording Academy announced that the category would be renamed to Best Contemporary Country Album and a new Best Traditional Country Album category would be created. This move drew widespread criticism, with fans accusing the Academy of gatekeeping and trivializing certain awards in response to Beyoncé's success.

=== Social media usage ===
Beyoncé's use of social media has been described as a model for how it should be used by celebrities. Time's Cady Lang wrote that Beyoncé set the precedent for artists to promote their music using social media, rather than traditional media interviews that would accompany an album release. NPR's Ann Powers said that Beyoncé is the exemplar for other social media users, noting her ability to share moments that feel intimate and casual while still not invading her privacy. In Popular Music, Stars, and Stardom, Beyoncé's use of technology and social media to build connections with her fans and produce significant works of music is said to encourage other popular musicians to use such tools "to establish an audience base and then to operate more independently of the major industry players". Other celebrities have followed Beyoncé's lead of sharing looks on Instagram before emerging in the public eye, allowing them to control their image and narrative before photographers can publish photographs first.

== Socio-politics ==
=== Race ===
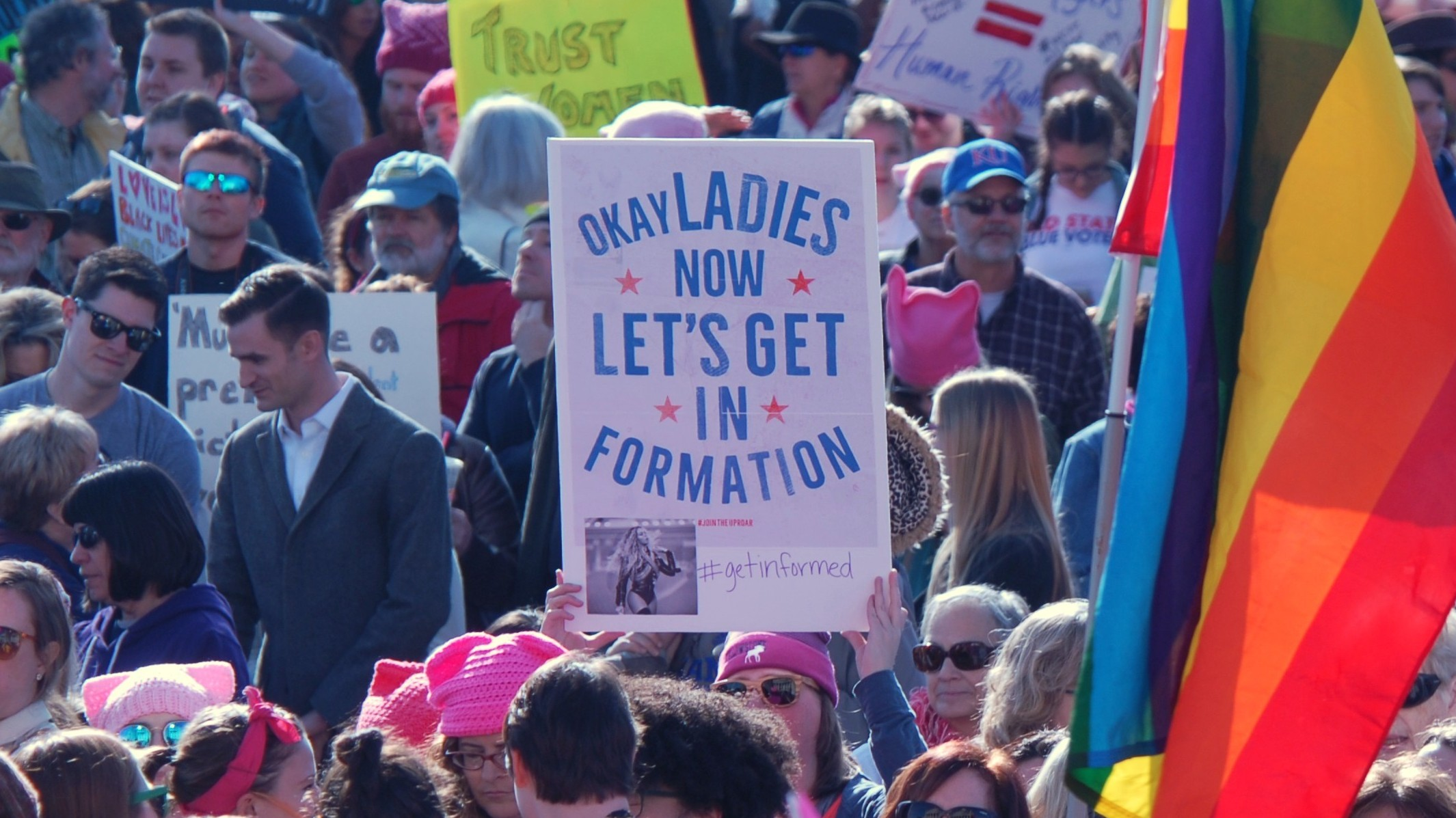
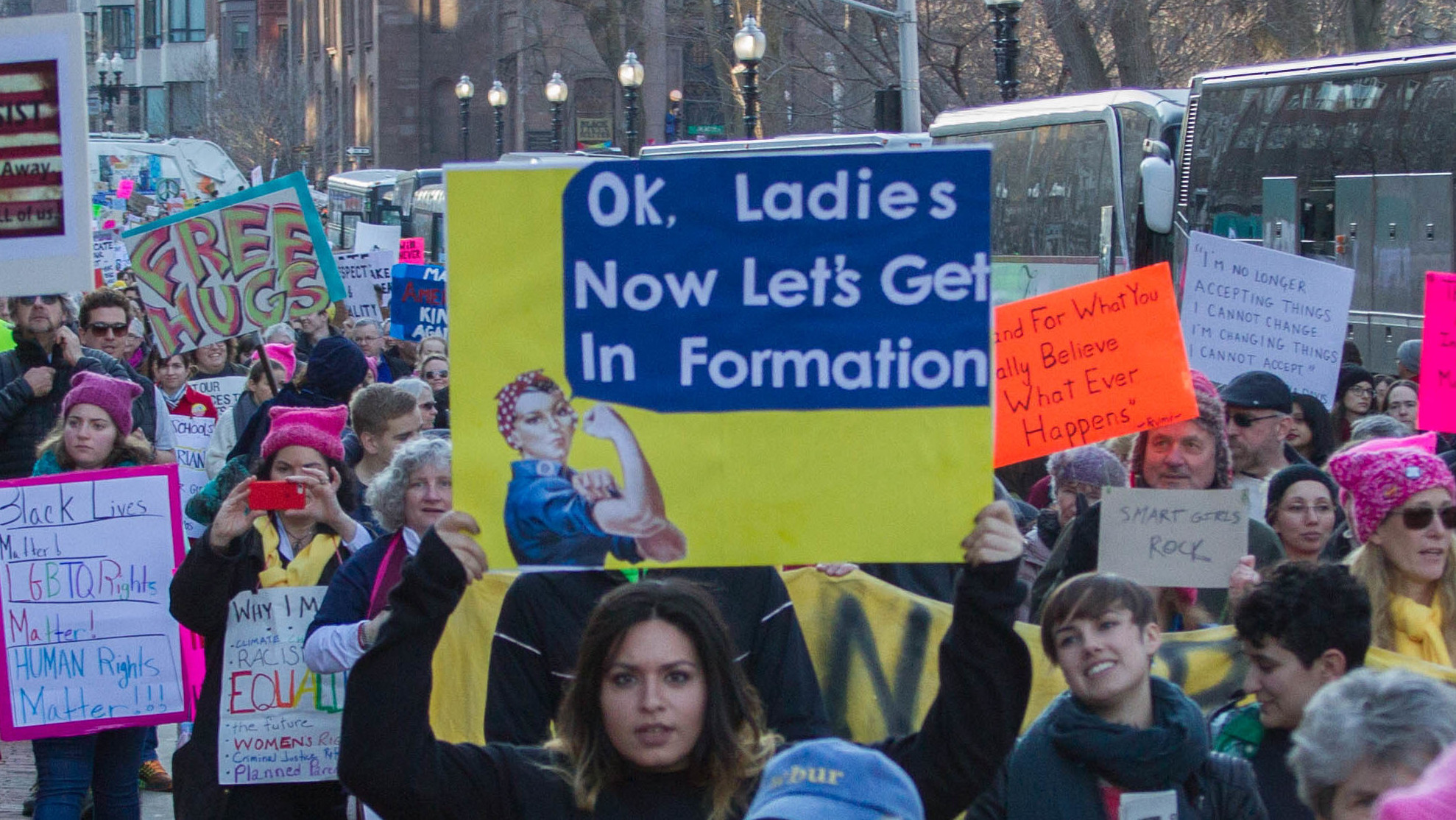
"Formation" has been used as an anthem for various socio-political movements, with its lyrics featuring signs at protests.

Former President of the United States Barack Obama, in a speech on racial inequality delivered to Howard University, explained how Beyoncé's dominance as a Black woman would not have been seen as possible when he was a graduate, with Beyoncé acting as a symbol for how the US is a "better place today". In Black Camera, Stephanie Li wrote that Beyoncé has "profoundly transformed images of [B]lackness" by "cultivating an air of astounding exceptionality" and "extraordinary talent and vision", in a manner that is only comparable to Obama. She also wrote that even though Beyoncé has raised money for Black Lives Matter groups and has rallied others against police brutality, her most powerful contribution to the Black Lives Matter movement has been Lemonade, "which tapped into a need for healing, strength, and hope among a [B]lack community devastated by an onslaught of men and women killed in police encounters". The Guardian's Syreeta McFadden noted that Beyoncé has depicted archetypal southern Black women "in ways that we haven't seen frequently represented in popular art or culture", while Miriam Bale for Billboard named Lemonade "a revolutionary work of [B]lack feminism". According to Andrea Peterson of The Washington Post, "Beyoncé has increasingly used her platform and her art to address racial inequality, especially in the wake of police-involved deaths of [B]lack men that have dominated headlines in recent years." Peterson also described her as a "powerful voice for the Black Lives Matter movement", noting that this has caused her to receive hatred and vitriol from conservative outlets.

Beyoncé and her Blackness have been the subject of various conversations throughout her career, including in her music and films, by music journalists and the media. Beyoncé has been called the "most politically divisive" celebrity in the United States and "Black America's great communicator". She has also consistently supported the Black Lives Matter movement, donating millions of dollars to various charities, bailed out several protesters who could not pay their bail following anti-police brutality demonstrations in Baltimore and Ferguson, Missouri, and publicly dedicated her BET Humanitarian Award to the movement. She has used her social media platform and celebrity status to highlight racial injustices on several occasions, including after the murder of George Floyd, issuing an open letter to Kentucky Attorney General Daniel Cameron, calling out the lack of arrests in the case of Breonna Taylor, and attending protests after the killing of Trayvon Martin. The latter resulted in a threat made by George Zimmerman, the man who fatally shot Martin.

Beyoncé's work has prompted significant discussions on race and Black history. Hunter Harris commented on this phenomenon for Refinery29, writing: "Beyoncé's work is often a battleground for these discussions about race, privilege, and culture because the musician has such a singular importance to Black women." She has released several songs largely considered to be anthems for the African American community, including "Black Parade", "Freedom", and "Formation". The lattermost dominated public conversation and ignited discussions on the topics of culture, racism, and politics. Several of Beyoncé's songs have since been used as an anthem for various socio-political movements. "Formation" became a Black Lives Matter anthem, being adopted by activists and played at protests worldwide. The song garnered attention for the Black Lives Matter movement and raised awareness for issues facing Black people before the 2016 US presidential election. Charles Hughes, professor and director of the Memphis Center at Rhodes College, said that music was one of the strongest influences on the 2016 presidential election and that "Formation" had the greatest influence of all songs. Hughes described the song as "invoking movement" and reminding listeners of the role of women in the Black Lives Matter movement. In Michael Moore in TrumpLand, American filmmaker Michael Moore said that Beyoncé's performance of "Formation" at the Super Bowl was the breaking point of the shifting gender balance in American society, at which straight white men realized they were losing their power to women.

“When I first started, 21 years ago, I was told that it was hard for me to get onto covers of magazines because [B]lack people did not sell. Clearly, that has been proven a myth.… It’s important to me that I help open doors for younger artists. There are so many cultural and societal barriers to entry that I like to do what I can to level the playing field, to present a different point of view for people who may feel like their voices don’t matter.”

— Beyoncé, Behind the Scenes of Vogue Cover Shoot.

In 2018, Beyoncé chose Tyler Mitchell to photograph her Vogue September issue, thereby making Mitchell the first Black photographer to shoot a cover for Vogue in its 126-year history. Additionally, a portrait from this editorial was acquired for the permanent exhibit at the Smithsonian National Portrait Gallery in Washington, D.C.

=== Feminism ===
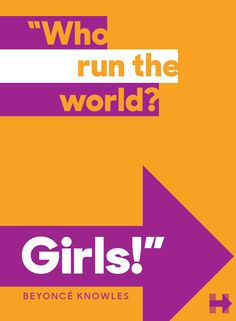
A Hillary Clinton campaign poster used a quote from Beyoncé's "Run The World (Girls)".

Beyoncé is credited with helping to popularize the feminist movement and mainstreaming intersectional feminism. Beyoncé was described as the most influential feminist in America by The Washington Post, citing how her form of feminism – which encompasses self-reliance, sexual confidence, representation, and economic empowerment – resonates with younger women. David DeNicolo and Meirav Devash of Allure wrote that "Beyoncé is often hailed a paragon and popularizer of the twenty-first-century women's movement". Writing for NPR, Ann Powers said that Beyoncé set the bar for the other women who have achieved success in the music industry, who followed Beyoncé's precedent by integrating messages related to feminism and liberation in their music.

Beyoncé has been credited with ushering in a new wave of feminism that embraces sexuality and motherhood, and with the introduction of feminist literature to the mainstream. Her performance of the song "Flawless" at the 2014 MTV Video Music Awards in front a giant backdrop reading "Feminist." was "a significant moment for fourth-wave feminism" according to Harry Fletcher of the Evening Standard. Jessica Bennett of Time commented that the broadcast of the definition of "feminist" by "the most powerful celebrity in the world" to 12 million Americans was the "holy grail" of feminist endorsements, while writer Roxane Gay added that the performance aided feminism in a way that had never been seen before. Rebecca Traister of The New Republic described the performance as the most powerful pop culture message of her lifetime, as a signal that "the women's movement is not only thriving but expanding."

Professor Kameelah L. Martin told Ms. that Lemonade was an "unprecedented" act in how Black women were centered in the project, adding: "We have not seen anything like that in pop culture, and she is a force that can bring more awareness to our culture, to the Black female experience." HuffPost's Daniel Welsh wrote that Destiny's Child were unprecedented in how they promoted financial independence for women. Her style of feminism has been critiquied by scholars and critics: Chimamanda Ngozi Adichie described Beyoncé's feminism as leaning toward heteropatriarchal ideals, while bell hooks called Beyoncé's critiqued her visual representation as reinforcing patriarchal norms through sexualized imagery.

=== Political elections ===
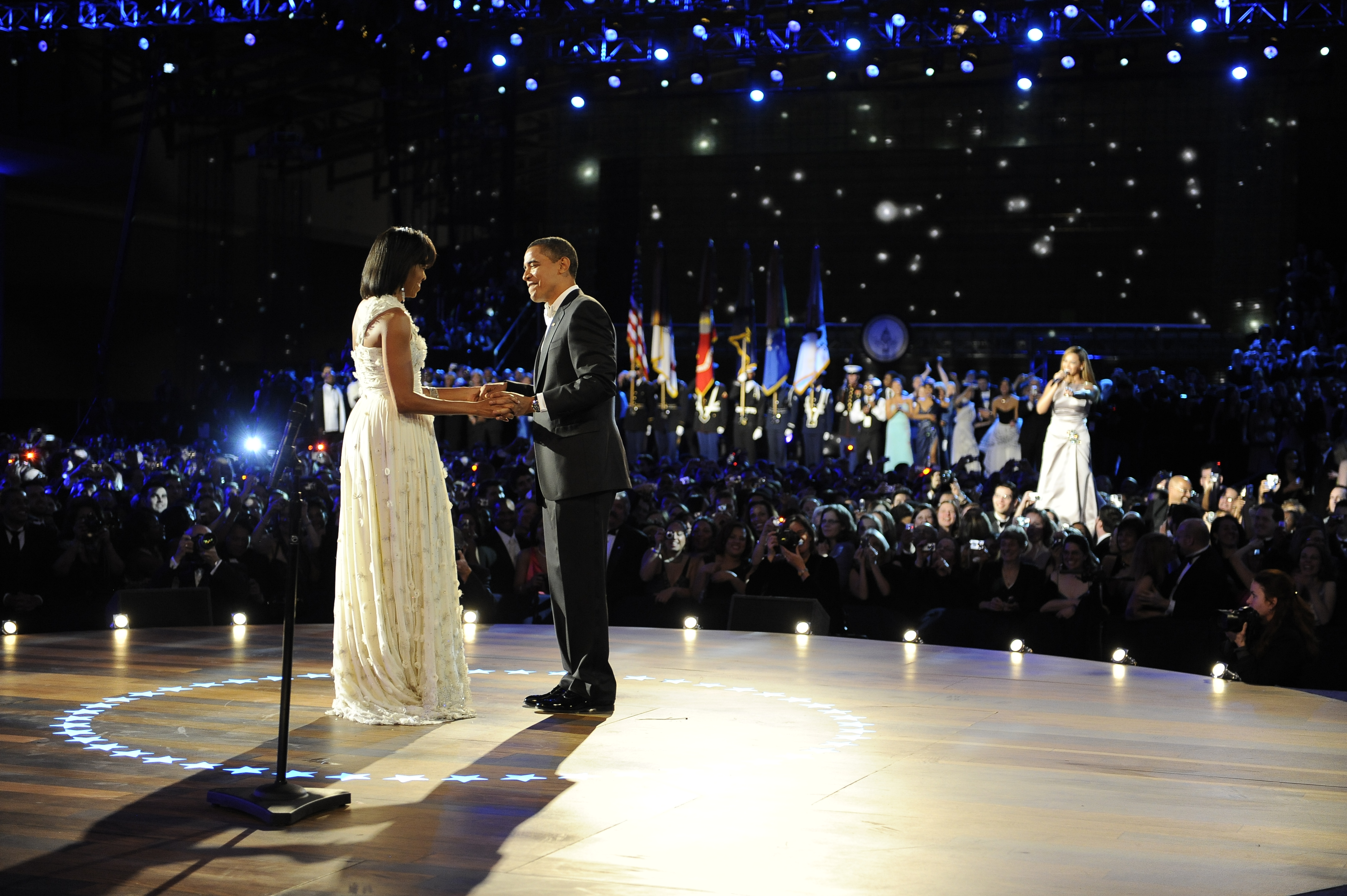
Beyoncé, who performed for Barack and Michelle Obama's first dance during his first inauguration, played a key role in mobilizing Black people to vote during the 2008 and 2012 presidential elections.

Beyoncé is credited with mobilizing the Black vote in the 2008 presidential election, contributing to Barack Obama's victory. Beyoncé also mobilized people to vote for Obama during the 2012 presidential election, with Beyoncé acting as a public face for Black women, who voted at a higher rate than any other group and were key to Obama's success. Trevor Nelson described Beyoncé mobilization of Americans, particularly marginalized communities, to vote for Obama in the elections as a "game-changer". An Instagram post by Beyoncé for the 2020 presidential election was cited by 80% of Gen Z voters as energizing them to vote.

According to Kevin Allred, Beyoncé "revolutionized the American political landscape", with her work being an essential tool to reinvigorate political education. In 2014, the term "Beyoncé voters" was coined by Fox News' Jesse Watters to describe single women who care about contraception, healthcare, and equal pay, and "depend on government because they're not depending on their husbands". The term went viral and sparked controversy, with critics condemning the characterization of women as a monolith and the factual inaccuracies in Watters' claims. Writing for The Atlantic, Spencer Kornhaber described how Beyoncé was on the frontlines of the culture wars of 2016, with her actions revealing "just how divided the country is".

== Fame and stardom ==
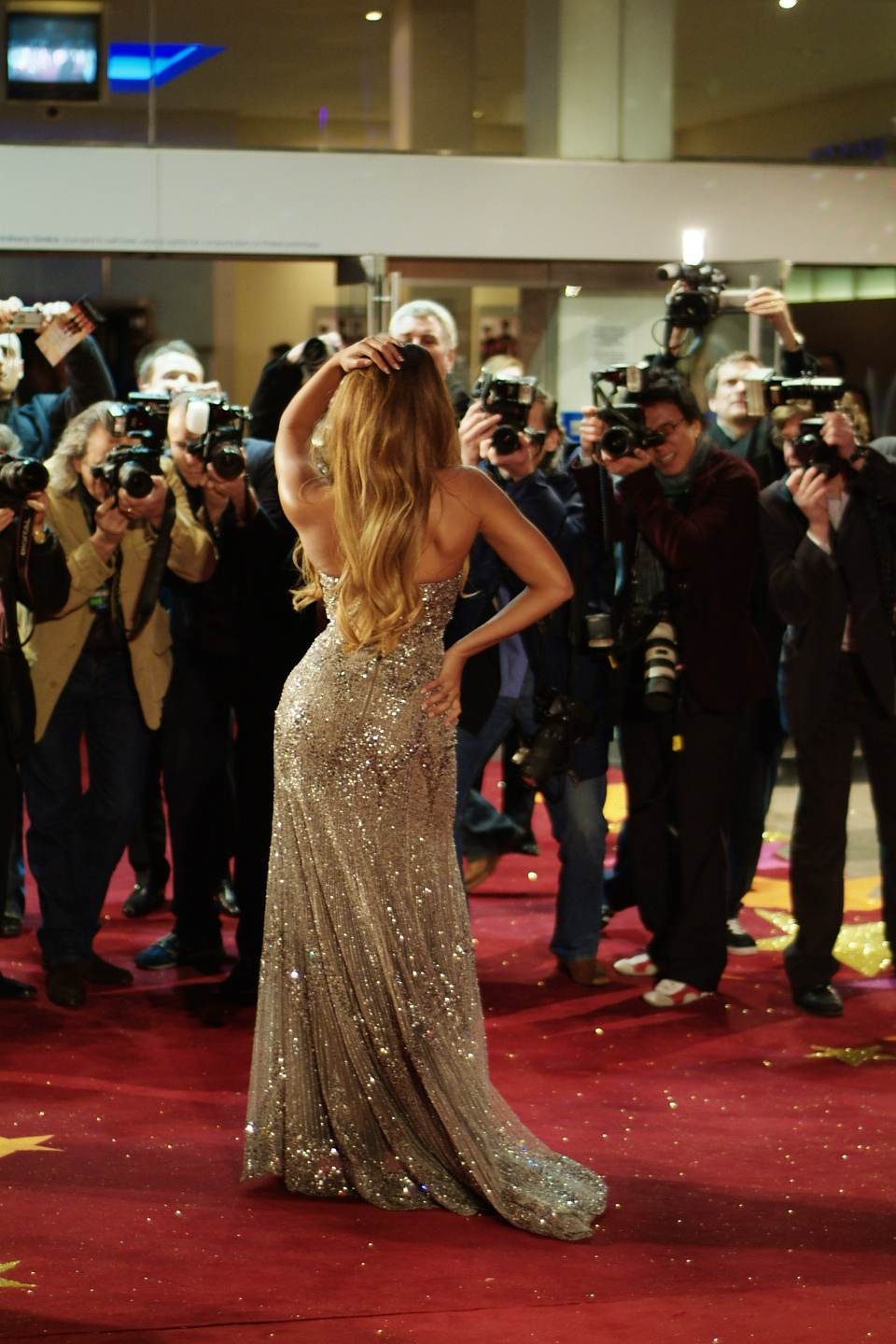
Critics regularly describe Beyoncé as possessing a level of cultural importance above other celebrities.

Beyoncé has commonly been referred to as one of the most famous or most powerful singers in the world by several media publications and popular figures, including Forbes, BBC, and YouGov. Time magazine featured her among a list of 100 women who defined the 21st century and named her one of the most influential person in the world in 2014. Due to her level of fame, Beyoncé has achieved a near omnipresence in pop culture. She has been referenced in numerous songs, TV shows and films over the course of her career. Entertainment Weekly's Alex Suskind noted that her "songs, album rollouts, stage presence, social justice initiatives, and disruptive public relations strategy have influenced the way we've viewed music since 2010." Stephanie Li wrote in Black Camera that Beyoncé's continued impact can be attributed to how she reinvents herself "again and again through record-setting albums, transformative songs and videos, and visionary marketing strategies.

Beyoncé has been recognized as one of the most influential figures in music history by numerous publications, including Rolling Stone and the Associated Press. She was named Billboard's Greatest Pop Star of the 21st Century, and topped NPR list of the "21st Century's Most Influential Women Musicians". She was repeatedly named a defining artist of both the 2000s decade and the 2010s decade. In The New Yorker, music critic Jody Rosen described Beyoncé as "the most important and compelling popular musician of the twenty-first century ... the result, the logical end point, of a century-plus of pop." James Clear, in his book Atomic Habits (2018), draws a parallel between Beyoncé's success and the dramatic transformations in modern society: "In the last one hundred years, we have seen the rise of the car, the airplane, the television, the personal computer, the internet, the smartphone, and Beyoncé."

Critics have described Beyoncé as possessing a status that is beyond the world of celebrity. Kiana Fitzgerald of NPR wrote that the title of "pop star" does not apply to Beyoncé any longer, with Beyoncé creating "an entirely new matrix of celebrity". Arwa Mahadi of The Guardian described how Beyoncé's projects aren't solely albums but cultural events, adding: "Beyoncé has risen to a rare level of fame where she has surpassed mere celebrity and become an archetype of achievement." In a profile for The New York Times, Jody Rosen wrote: "Beyoncé has become something more than just a superstar. She is a kind of national figurehead, an Entertainer in Chief; she is Americana. Someday, surely, her "Single Ladies" leotard will take its place alongside Mickey Mouse and the Model T Ford and Louis Armstrong's trumpet in a Smithsonian display case." In an article for The Guardian, Tshepo Mokoena asserted that Beyoncé destroyed the idea of performers "just sticking to the music", instead leading a creative revolution that has allowed artists such as Kanye West, Donald Glover and Rihanna to explore new creative avenues and industries.

The French encyclopedic dictionary Petit Larousse Illustré added Beyoncé's name as a proper noun in its 2024 update.

=== Subject of controversies ===
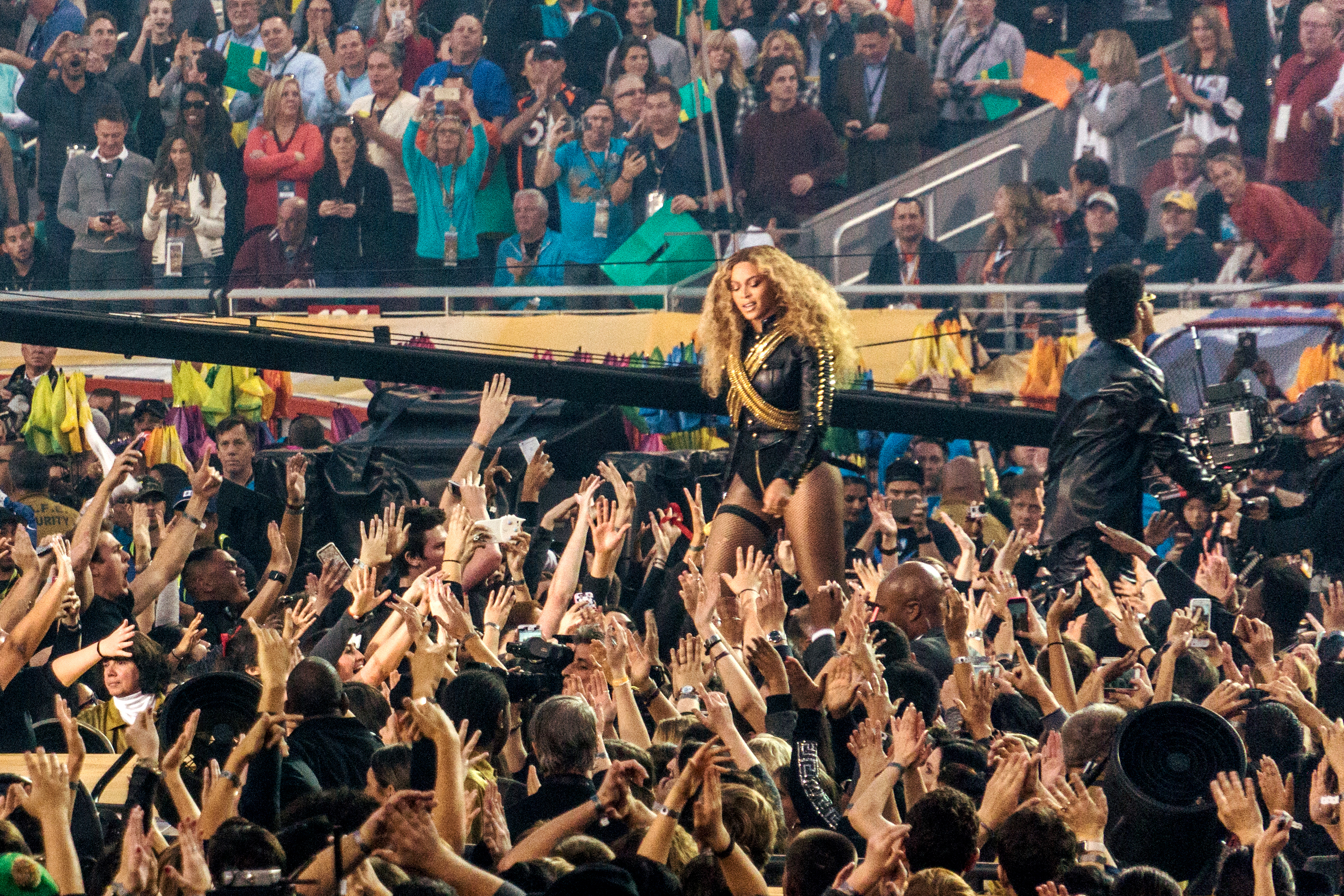
Beyoncé's performance at the Super Bowl 50 halftime show was both praised and castigated.

Beyoncé has been the subject of various protests and boycotts throughout her career. The Beyoncé Experience was scheduled to visit Kuala Lumpur, Malaysia on November 1, 2007; however, the show was ultimately canceled due to Malaysia's strict Islam-based laws surrounding the clothing that women in public, and women performers, can wear. Several publications reported that the news followed an uptick in protests by several conservative groups, including the National Union of Malaysian Muslim Students, urging the Ministry of Culture, Arts and Heritage to stop the concert from taking place. Several years later, Beyoncé attempted to return to Malaysia during her I Am... World Tour. She again was met with strong opposition from religious groups in Kuala Lumpur and agreed to tone down some parts of her performance. A spokesperson for the Pan-Malaysian Islamic Party stated: "We are against Western sexy performances; we don't think our people need that." He went on saying that Beyoncé should be regarded as a "role model" and an "embodiment of success" because of her philanthropic work, including campaigns against poverty and domestic violence. The Marctensia promoter further told the Associated Press: "We are confident that Beyoncé's concert will once and for all silence international critics and put Malaysia back on track and move up the ranks in presenting A-list international pop concerts in this region and further boost tourism."

Following her performance at the Super Bowl 50 halftime show, where Beyoncé and her dancers wore outfits widely perceived to be reminiscent of the Black Panther Movement, the Fraternal Order of Police said in a statement that it had voted to let its members boycott Beyoncé's upcoming concert at Miami's LoanDepot Park because it believed Beyoncé had used the Super Bowl halftime show "to divide Americans by promoting the Black Panthers." The group called for other law enforcement organizations to boycott her concerts as well. Police unions in Nashville and Tampa later urged officers not to volunteer to work security during Beyoncé's performances in those cities. Former New York City mayor Rudy Giuliani accused the performance of being anti-police and also criticized Beyoncé's use of Black Power and Black Panther Party symbolism in her dance routine. "This is football, not Hollywood, and I thought it was outrageous that she used it as a platform to attack police officers who are the people who protect her and protect us and keep us alive," he said. There were planned protest outside of the National Football League's headquarters, however, no one showed up. Nine months following her performance at the Super Bowl halftime show, Beyoncé was met with similar opposition and media attention after her performance at the 50th Annual Country Music Association Awards for both the return of the Dixie Chicks to the CMA stage following their controversial statements about George Bush which saw them shut out of the country music industry as well as her appearance in general. Their performance of "Daddy Lessons" from Beyoncé's Lemonade album polarized viewers, artists, and critics alike, with some praising the collaboration, though many country fans claimed Beyoncé did not belong at the event following her alignment with the Black Lives Matter movement and references at the Super Bowl.

During a performance of the Cowboy Carter Tour, Beyoncé was criticized for wearing a shirt depicting Buffalo Soldiers and which described the soldiers as fighting against "enemies of peace" and "warring Indians", which was viewed by some as anti-indigenous sentiment.

=== "Beyoncé" as an honorific ===
The term "Beyoncé" has been used a superlative honorific title, both within and outside of the music industry. It is common for a popular figure to be referred to as "the Beyoncé of" a specific category or group, often used as a superlative by the media.

The term "Beyoncé" became visible in the profile of various performers, with some artists being planned or promoted as "the next Beyoncé" or as "Beyoncé's successor" in their debut era by their record label or music journalists, including Rihanna, Lizzo, and Tinashe.

Several artists from outside the US have been dubbed the "Beyoncé" of their native country. This includes Rihanna (the Bajan Beyoncé), Rosalía (the Spanish Beyonce), Naomi Watanabe (the Japanese Beyoncé), Ailee (the Korean Beyoncé), Yemi Alade (the African Beyoncé), Urvashi Rautela (the Indian Beyoncé), Shiri Maimon (the Israeli Beyoncé), Eleni Foureira (the Cypriot Beyoncé), Meivin Malelak (the Indonesian Beyoncé), Nadine Lustre (the Southeast Asian Beyoncé), Naomi Wang (the Chinese Beyoncé), Anitta and Iza (the Brazilian Beyoncé),, Lali Espósito (the Argentine Beyoncé), and Lewis Capaldi regularly calls himself the Scottish Beyoncé.

Outside of music, "Beyoncé" is used as an honorific title for people (and especially women) who are the leaders of their respective industries. In the arts and entertainment industries, this includes "The Beyoncé of Television" Shonda Rhimes, "The Beyoncé of Art History" Artemisia Gentileschi, "The Beyoncé of Opera" J'Nai Bridges, "The Beyoncé of Acting" Meryl Streep, "The Beyoncé of Broadway" Marisha Wallace, "The Beyoncé of Ceramics" Magdalene Odundo, "The Beyoncé of Quilts" Bisa Butler, "The Beyoncé of Podcasting" Roman Mars, "The Beyoncé of Drag" Shangela, "The Beyoncé of Piano" Khatia Buniatishvili, "The Beyoncé of Tidying" Marie Kondo, and "The Beyoncé of Cakes" Yolanda Gampp. In sports, recipients of the honorific title include "The Beyoncé of Gymanstics" Simone Biles, "The Beyoncé of Boxing" Claressa Shields, "The Beyoncé of Sports" Ronda Rousey, "The Beyoncé of the WNBA" A'ja Wilson, "The Beyoncé of Basketball" Candace Parker, and "The Beyoncé of Racing" Rachael Blackmore. In news and politics, recipients of the title include "The Beyoncé of The Law" Baroness Hale, "The Beyoncé of Politics" Alexandria Ocasio-Cortez, "The Beyoncé of Abortion Storytelling" Renee Bracey Sherman, and "The Beyoncé of Investigative Journalism" Nikole Hannah-Jones. In science and business, recipients include "The Beyoncé of Earthquakes" Lucy Jones, "The Beyoncé of Science" Jennifer Doudna, "The Beyoncé of CIOs" Robert B. Carter, and "The Beyoncé of Economics" Raj Chetty.

Following tension in the Government of National Unity following the decline of support for the African National Congress (ANC) in the 2024 South African general election, Clement Manyathela said: "The ANC needs to realise its time of glory and being charge on its own is gone. It's not the Beyoncé of the group."

== Fashion ==
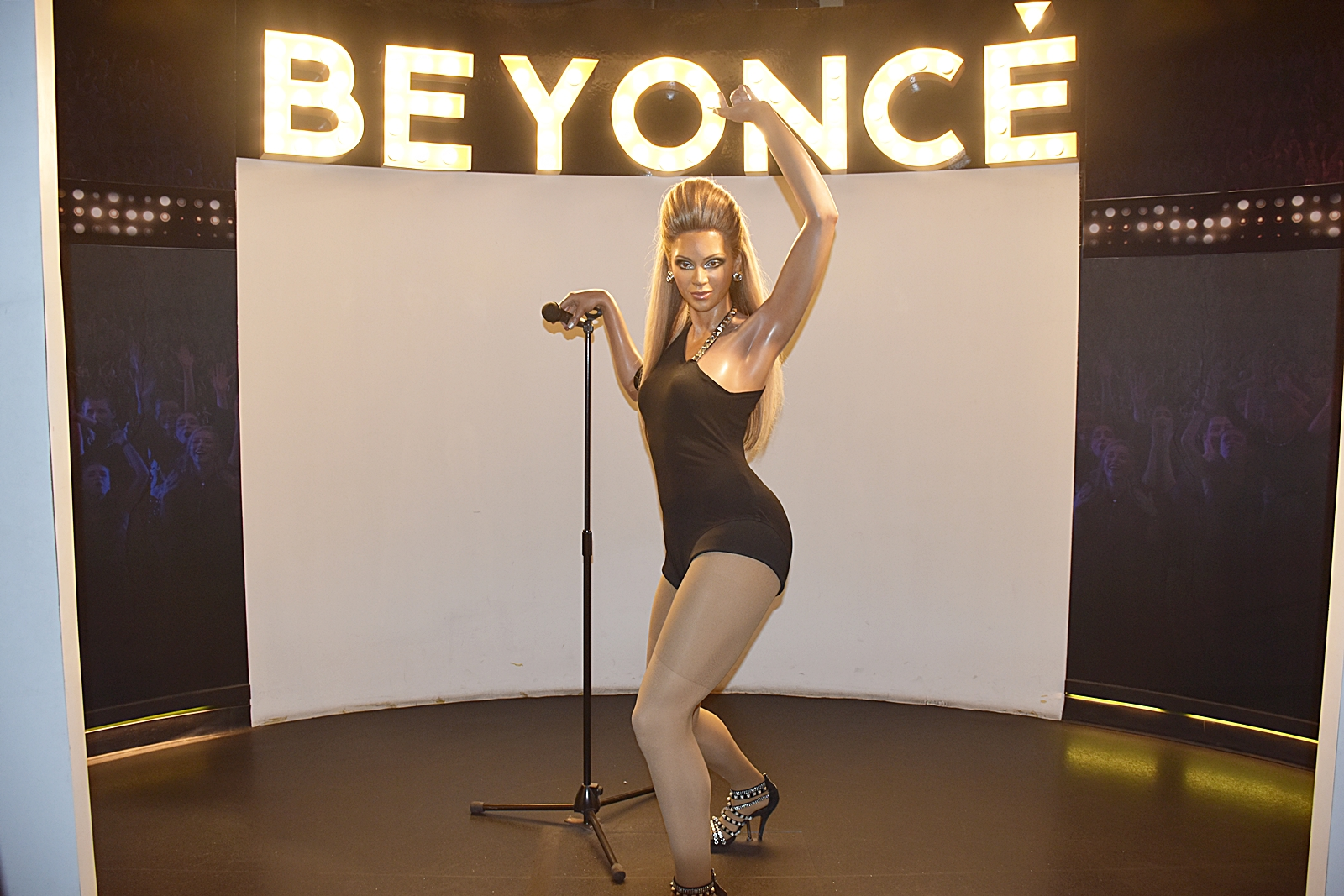
Beyoncé is credited with popularizing the leotard for female performers, seen her on a wax figure at Madame Tussauds London.

Beyoncé is described as a "style icon" and has made an impact on the fashion industry. Editor of Marie Claire Nicky Briger explained Beyoncé's fashion influence, writing: "Whatever Beyonce wears, the world takes notice. She'll put designers and trends on the map." Designer Maria Lucia Hohan told Complex that while other celebrities have worn her designs before, Beyoncé is on a different level, saying: "Beyoncé's style and her fashions get so much attention whether it is an award show, a concert stage, a red carpet or a music video—nothing goes unnoticed when it comes to her star power." Beyoncé is one of the artists whose music videos impact fashion the most, according to a study by Vevo. She has had several ventures into the fashion industry, including owning fashion brands House of Deréon and Ivy Park, appearing at events such as the Met Gala, and made her runway modeling debut at Tom Ford's Spring/Summer 2011 fashion show. She became the first non-athlete to cover Sports Illustrated and has appeared on the cover of Vogue four times throughout her career. Tyler Mitchell became the first African-American photographer to shoot a Vogue cover after Beyoncé handpicked him. Beyoncé has set various fashion trends throughout her career, and aspects of her style looks, and clothing have influenced the public, designers, and other entertainers of different generations. Beyoncé's photoshoots and personal belongings have been displayed in museums and other exhibitions around the world, including several at the Rock and Roll Hall of Fame. She is often credited with popularizing the leotard as a performance outfit after appearing in the "Single Ladies (Put a Ring on It)" music video and subsequent performances. Beyoncé has also received various awards for her fashion, including the CFDA Fashion Icon Award in 2016.

Powerhouse Museum Senior curator Roger Leong explained that while there are influencers in high fashion, Beyoncé brings fashion trends into the mainstream. Joe Zee, editor-in-chief of Yahoo Style, explained how Beyoncé takes a fashion idea "and makes it sexier, more feminine—desirable but also accessible", which the fashion world then borrows from. Introducing Beyoncé as the recipient of the 2016 CFDA Fashion Icon Award, designer Diane von Furstenberg said: "The image of a woman being in charge has never looked more glamorous and more desirable. She is everything all women want to be and after listening to her, no woman should ever feel belittled or insecure again. Talent, heart, strength, and courage. That is what true style is about and all of that is what Beyoncé is the best example of."

Stephen Wigley, associate dean of fashion enterprise at RMIT University, opined that Beyoncé plays an altruistic role in fashion, raising the visibility of small Black designers who do not have the financial ability to secure endorsements to gain mainstream success. Janell Okwodu of Vogue described how Beyoncé has put Black designers at the forefront of fashion, adding: "Celebrity placements mean more for creators who aren't yet household names, and it doesn't get bigger than having Beyoncé feature your work in a music video or performance." Okwodu also noted how Beyoncé's fashion influence extends beyond her art, with Beyoncé's use of her Instagram feed and her Black Parade directory of Black-owned businesses further popularizing lesser-known Black designers.

Fashion trends that Beyoncé popularized include naked dresses, nameplate necklaces, lemon print, moon print, and flash tattoos. Beyoncé's clothing brand Ivy Park is credited with making athleisure go mass market. Beyoncé has also been credited with contributing to the 2010s resurgence of the Dior Saddle bag, by wearing it in public appearances in 2014.

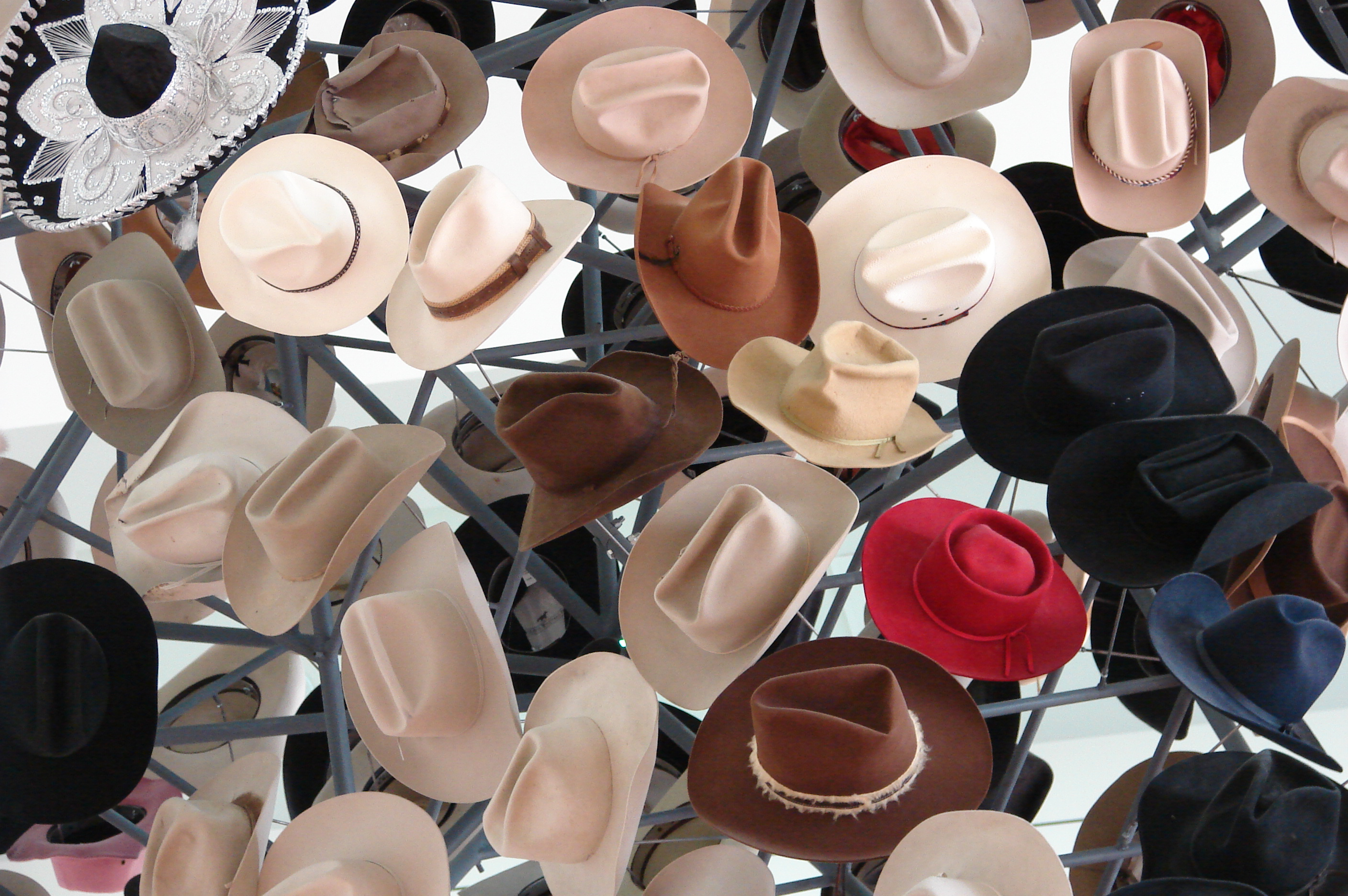
Cowboy Carter made Western wear a defining fashion trend for 2024 and led to a 326% surge in sales of cowboy hats.

Beyoncé's incorporation of country music and its culture sparked fashion movements and increased the sales of Western wear. Cowboy Carter has boosted the popularity of Western wear apparel, leading to a surge in searches for Western-style jeans (610%), bolo ties (566%), flared denim (372%), cowboy boots (224%), and cowboy hats (213%). The hat brand Stetson has observed a rise in demand for its products after Beyoncé showcased her affinity for the Western lifestyle. Cowboy Carter played a crucial role in achieving an impressive 326% boost in sales of cowboy hats, which was accompanied by a notable 45% increase in the sales of boots and fringed suede jackets. Influenced by the album, American fast fashion retailers like Forever 21 increased their stock of Western clothing by over 300%.

Many of the designers Beyoncé and her dancers wore in Black Is King saw triple-digit spikes in search traffic after the film's release. The Marine Serre moon print bodysuit that is featured in the film became "the most popular design of 2020", with the brand seeing a 426% increase in searches in the 48 hours after the film's release. Beyoncé's fashion in the film made her become the most influential woman in fashion in 2020. The film also helped raise awareness of African fashion worldwide. The film kicked off hair and makeup trends, with stylists and artists around the world creating looks inspired by those in Black Is King.

Renaissance World Tour resulted in an estimated media value exceeding $187 million for the esteemed fashion houses involved. These renowned fashion houses dedicated their expertise to craft unique couture pieces for Beyoncé and her dancers at every stop throughout the tour. Following Beyoncé's Instagram challenge to her fans to showcase their silver disco ball-inspired looks, the demand for silver has surged, leading to a significant boost in small business activity.

== Influence on popular culture ==
Beyoncé has added several phrases into the cultural lexicon, with certain words and phrases receiving a boost in popularity after Beyoncé includes them in her music. The terms "bootylicious", "visual album" and "Bama" were also added to the Oxford English Dictionary after Beyoncé used them in "Bootylicious" (2001), Beyoncé (2013) and "Formation" (2016), respectively. Other phrases that Beyoncé mainstreamed or popularized include "twerk", "FUPA", "Becky", "surfbordt", "I woke up like this", "shoulda put a ring on it", and "hot sauce in my bag". In 2019, the Democratic National Committee used "boy bye", a lyric from Beyoncé's "Sorry", in an anti-Donald Trump advertisement.

Beyoncé has mainstreamed several dances, including popularizing J-Setting with her "Single Ladies (Put a Ring on It)" video. Beyoncé is credited with popularizing veganism, as well as the Master Cleanse diet. Creative baby bump photoshoots were also popularized by Beyoncé.

=== Impact on brands ("The Beyoncé Effect") ===
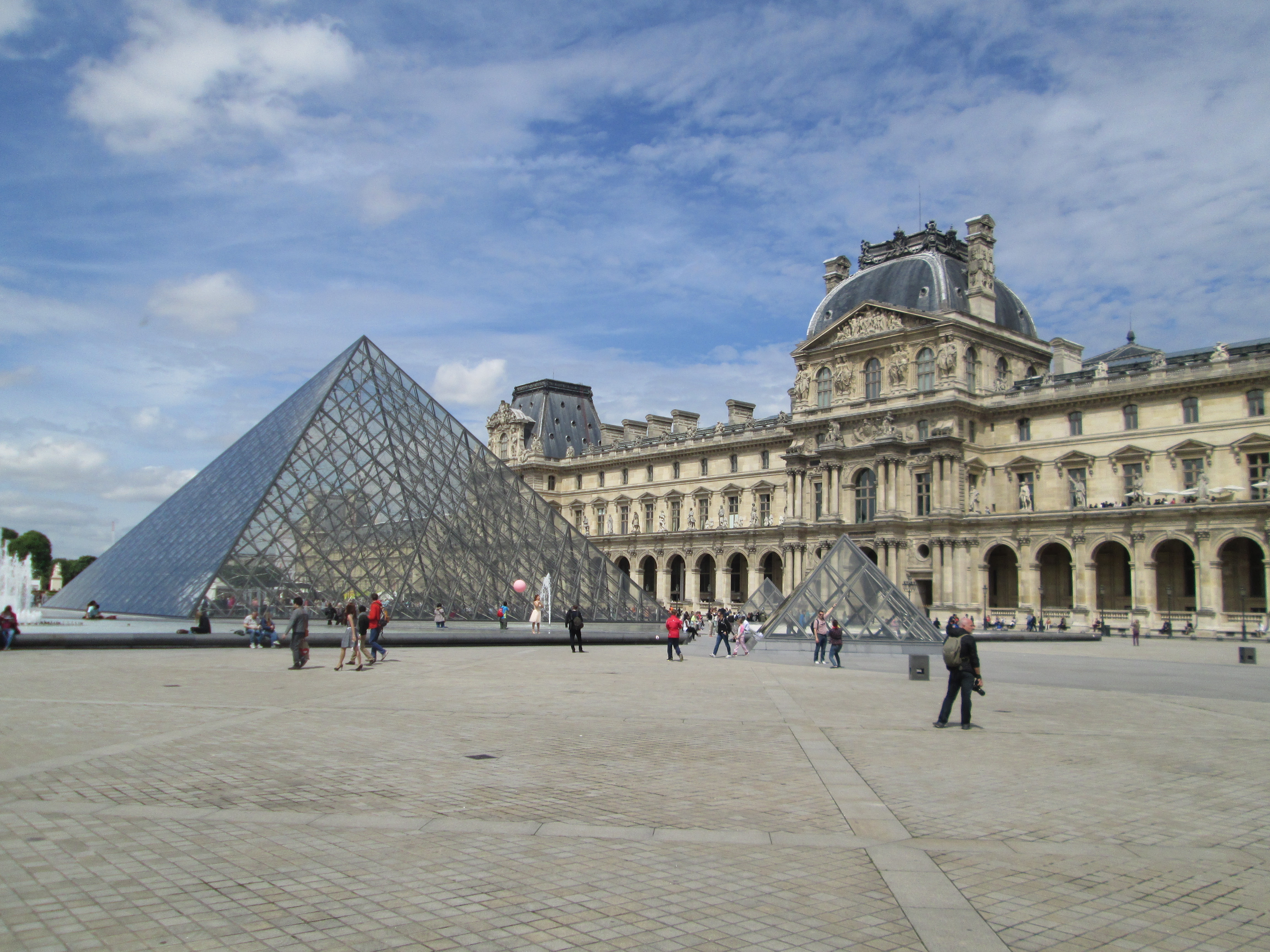
Beyoncé helped the Louvre become the most visited museum in 2018 after filming the "Apeshit" video at the museum.

The "Beyoncé Effect" is a term used by cultural critics and fans to describe Beyoncé's influence over market trends after featuring brands in her work. Eboni K. Williams explained for Revolt how Beyoncé "singlehandedly make[s] trends cool simply by putting her stamp of approval on it", attributing the phenomenon to the fact that the work Beyoncé has put in throughout her career has made it seem like she can do no wrong, "so when she does anything, she's the model of perfection".

Beyoncé boosted the popularity of the Louvre after filming the "Apeshit" music video in the museum, with the visitor count increasing by 25% to 10.2 million after the video's release, the highest count for any museum in history. After Beyoncé wore a moon print bodysuit by French designer Marine Serre in Black Is King, searches for the brand increased by 426% and the print was described as the design of 2020. Similarly, after wearing an outfit by Ivorian designer Loza Maléombho in the film, Maléombho received an immediate and overwhelming response, causing her website to crash and her sales to spike 300%. A suit designed by DSquared2 sold out after it was worn by Beyoncé in 2016. After shouting-out Red Lobster in "Formation", sales at the restaurant chain increased by 33%. Twitter wrote that the Beyoncé Effect after Lemonade caused the lemon and bee emojis to spike in usage. Gerrick D. Kennedy of the Los Angeles Times wrote that the Beyoncé Effect was present throughout Coachella 2018, with a line-up that was more inclusive of female, queer and minority artists.

After forming a partnership with Beyoncé to produce Ivy Park, Topshop's posts on Instagram received 50% more engagement. After Beyoncé gave OnlyFans a shoutout on "Savage Remix", the content service saw a 15% increase in traffic. Beyoncé's mention of Telfar and Birkin bags in the Renaissance closing track "Summer Renaissance" generated a large spike in demand for the brands. Following Beyoncé's mention of the American clothing brand Levi Strauss & Co. in the Cowboy Carter song "Levii's Jeans," the company experienced a 20% increase in its stock price. Cowboy Carter also independently contributed an extra $1.2 million to the brand, resulting from a rise of 1.5 billion online impressions. Levi's observed a 20% increase in customer visits to its US stores following the album's release, while British retailer John Lewis & Partners indicated that searches for "women's Levi's jeans" surged by 263% since the album was announced.

After posting pictures of a baby Blue Ivy on Tumblr, the website increased in popularity and was eventually sold to Yahoo for $1.1 billion. Beyoncé helped Facebook launch their Auto-Play feature after the release of her eponymous album in 2013. Beyoncé also helped launch the animated Branded Like feature on Twitter, after its use in the promotional campaign for Black Is King was well received by Twitter users and adopted by other brands including Apple, NASA and the NBA.

The BBC said that the Renaissance World Tour "mark[ed] a big economic moment", boosting countries' economies in a phenomenon dubbed the "Beyoncé effect", "Beyoncé bump", "Beyoncé blip" and "Beyflation" by experts. The influx of spending related to Beyoncé's performances in Stockholm, Sweden, has led to a rise in inflation levels within Sweden. According to Michael Grahn, who serves as the Chief Economist at Danske Bank, this situation is "very rare" and "astonishing for a single event", adding: "We haven't seen this before." In the UK, there has been a surprising rise in the consumer price index, which has compelled the Bank of England to reevaluate its inflation strategy. The event has catalyzed a significant 6.8 percent increase in spending on recreation and culture, the highest rate of growth in three decades. The Office for National Statistics has pointed to this increase in consumer activity as the leading cause of the current inflationary trends affecting the nation. Forbes described her as not just a global Icon but a magnate whose brand output perseveres in spite of the odds.

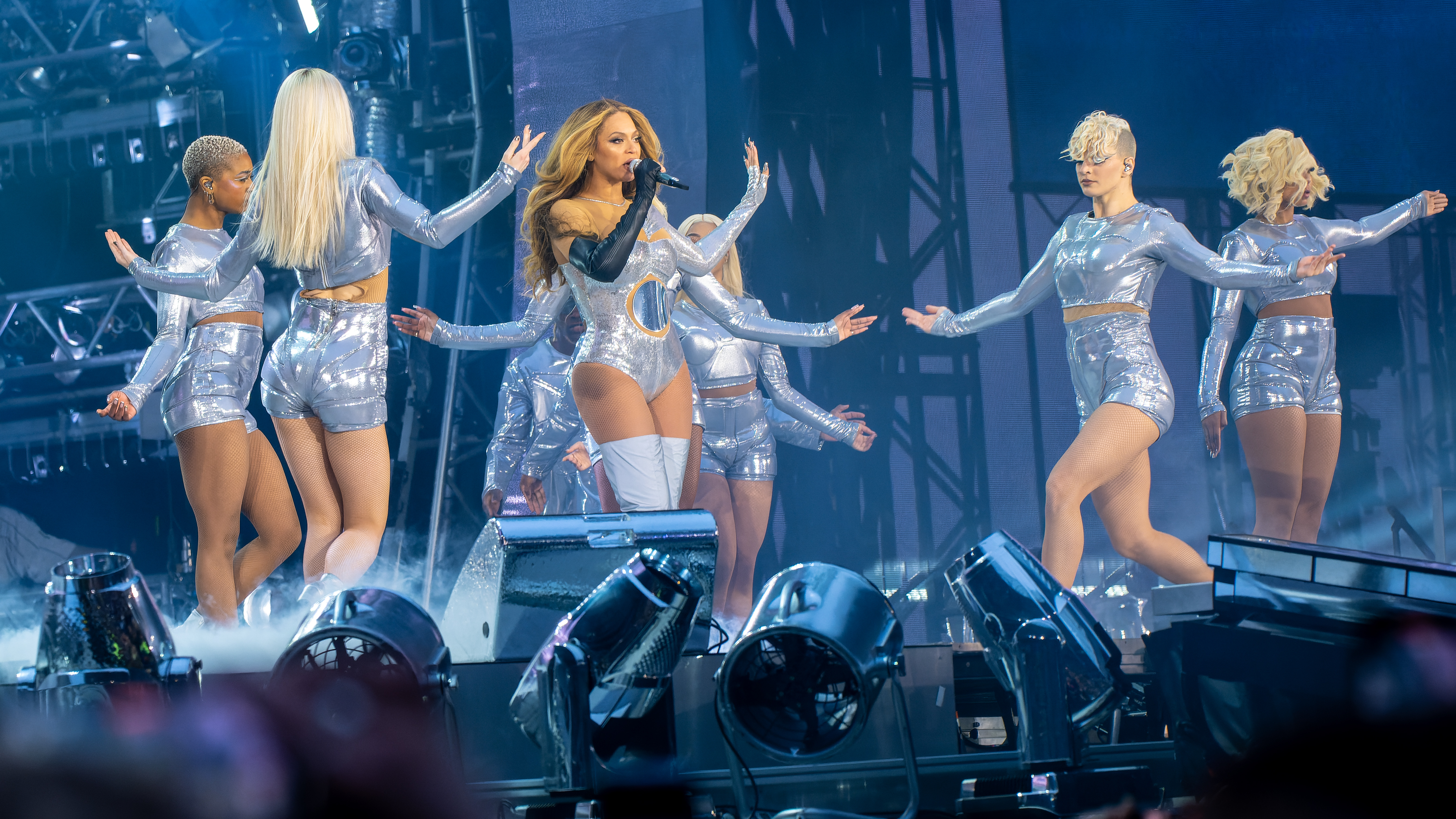
Economic revitalization occurred in each city that hosted Beyoncé's Renaissance World Tour.

The tour boosted the local economies of the cities it visited. QuestionPro estimated the tour could generate $4.5 billion in economic activity, which is similar to the revenue that the 2008 Summer Olympics of Beijing ($3.6 billion). Brett House, economist at Columbia Business School, said that the tour has helped create a "gentle cool-down" of economic activity in the US during the summer, instead of the usual abrupt stop. Professor Tom Smith from the Goizueta Business School at Emory University incorporated the Renaissance World Tour into his lectures as a case study, focusing on events that profoundly influence market dynamics. His analysis highlights how such large-scale events can shape consumer behavior and market trends. The tour's engagement in Atlanta, Georgia, produced an additional $10 million in revenue for the local business community.

Hotel prices "skyrocketed" during the tour's stops in Stockholm, and the city's tourism board, Visit Stockholm, recognized the "Beyonce effect" as a driving force behind the high levels of tourism and almost full hotel occupancy. Travelodge, a leading hotel chain in the UK, stated that the tour was vital in reaching "record-breaking [financial] results". The hotels in London, England, were at full capacity throughout Beyoncé's five sold-out concerts in the city, highlighting the strong link between major entertainment events and hotel occupancy rates. Over 90% of hotels in the vicinity of Tottenham Hotspur Stadium were fully reserved for the dates of Beyoncé's shows in London several months prior, and the price of hotel rooms in Sunderland surged by nearly 600% coinciding with Beyoncé's concert. On the day of the concert, hotel accommodation prices in Edinburgh, Scotland, saw a dramatic increase of more than 360%, with occupancy rates hitting 95.1% In Cardiff, Wales, 95.7% of hotel rooms were booked up coinciding Beyoncé's concert. In Cologne, Germany, the hotel sector thrived with an $80 revenue premium per available room. The city achieved a remarkable 95.3% occupancy rate, a significant leap from the average daily occupancy of 61.1%.

Beyoncé's first North American stop in Philadelphia, Pennsylvania, has resulted in a 21% increase in hotel searches, a 10% rise in shopping inquiries, and a 9% uptick in beauty service requests compared to the weekly average from the previous year. Additionally, restaurant interest experienced an impressive surge of over 30% on the day of her concert in the city. According to Yelp, Data shows that in the week prior to the event, fans are particularly eager to support businesses that are Black-owned, women-owned, and LGBTQ-owned.

== Influence on other artists ==
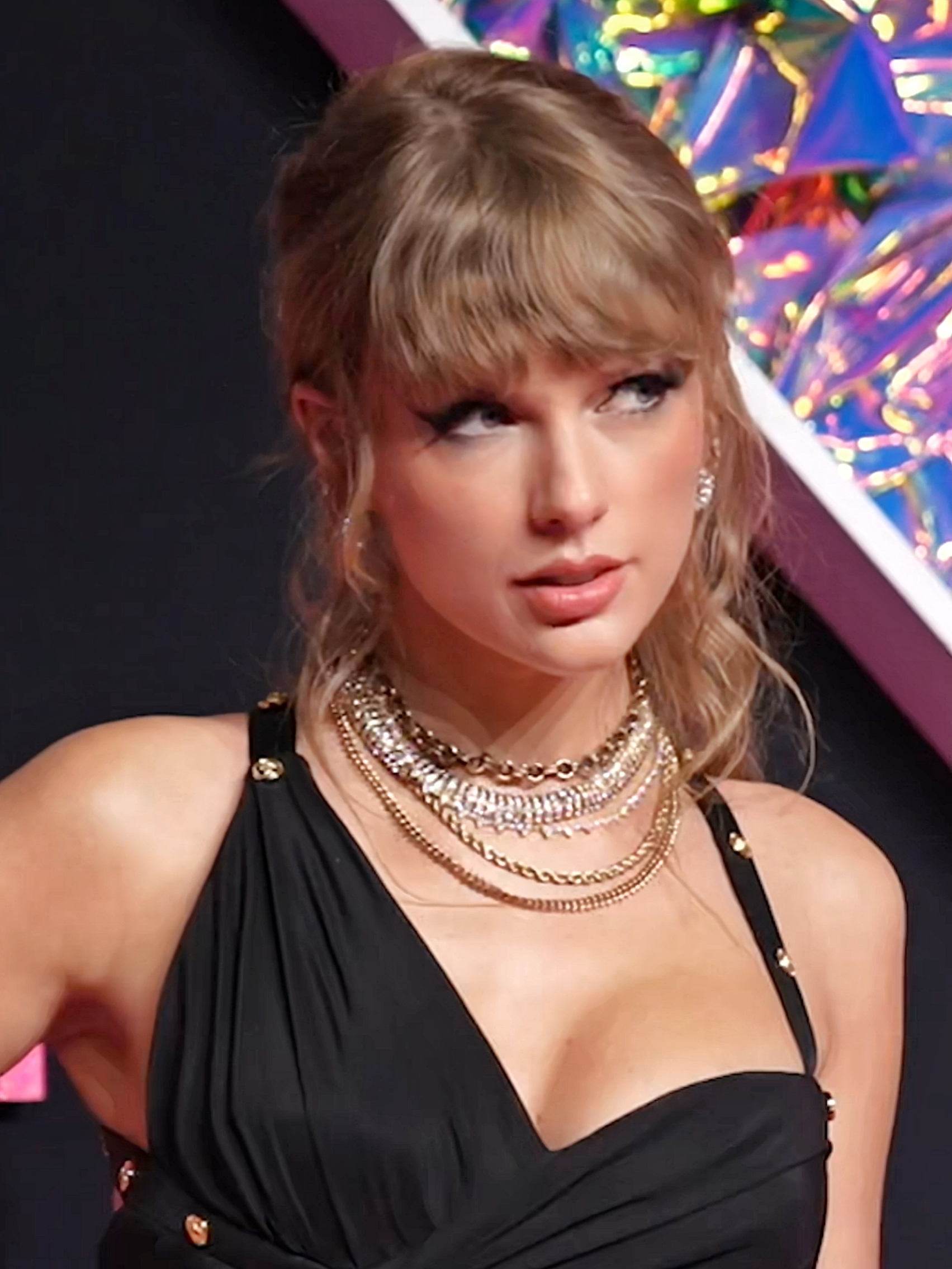
Taylor Swift

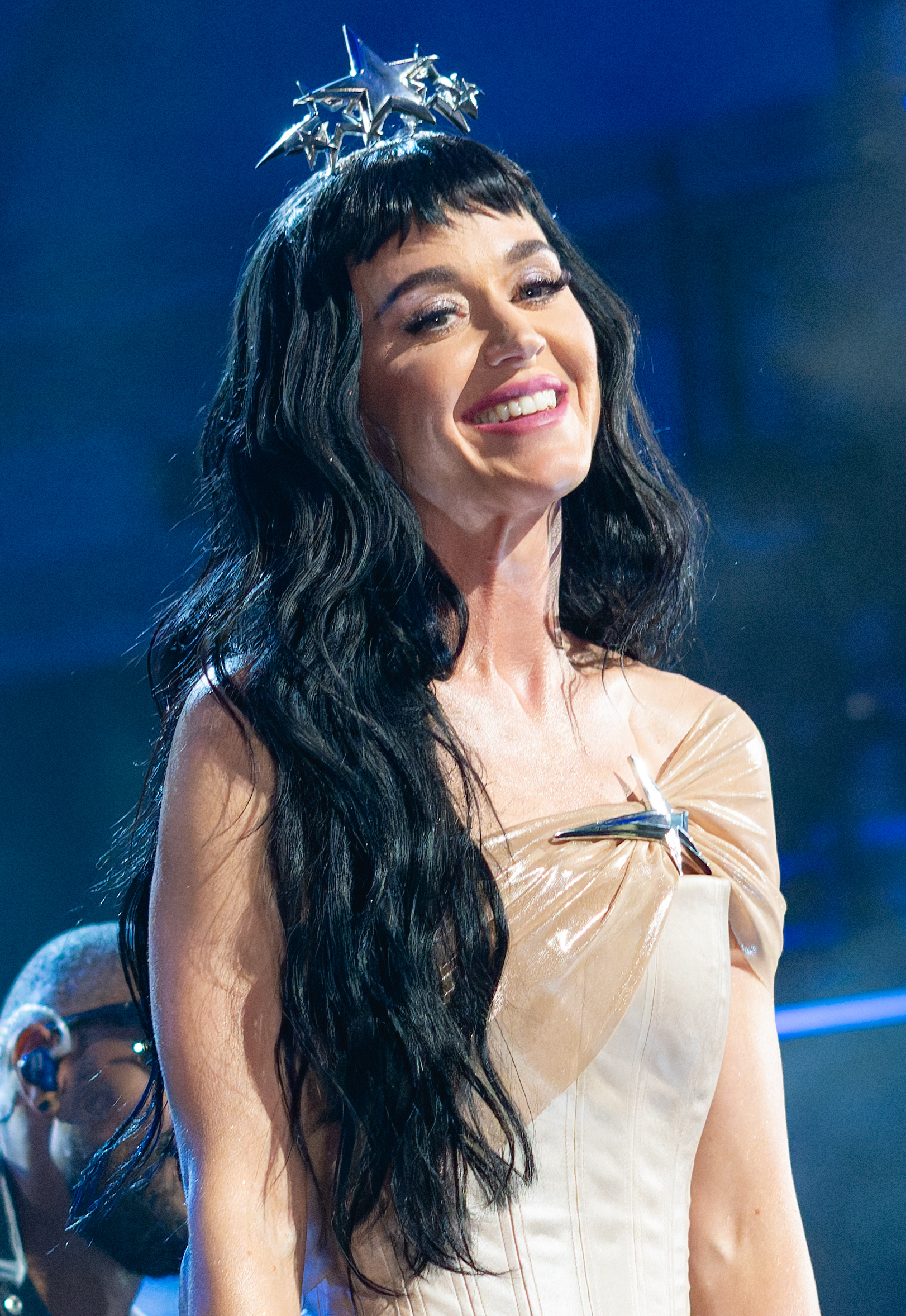
Katy Perry

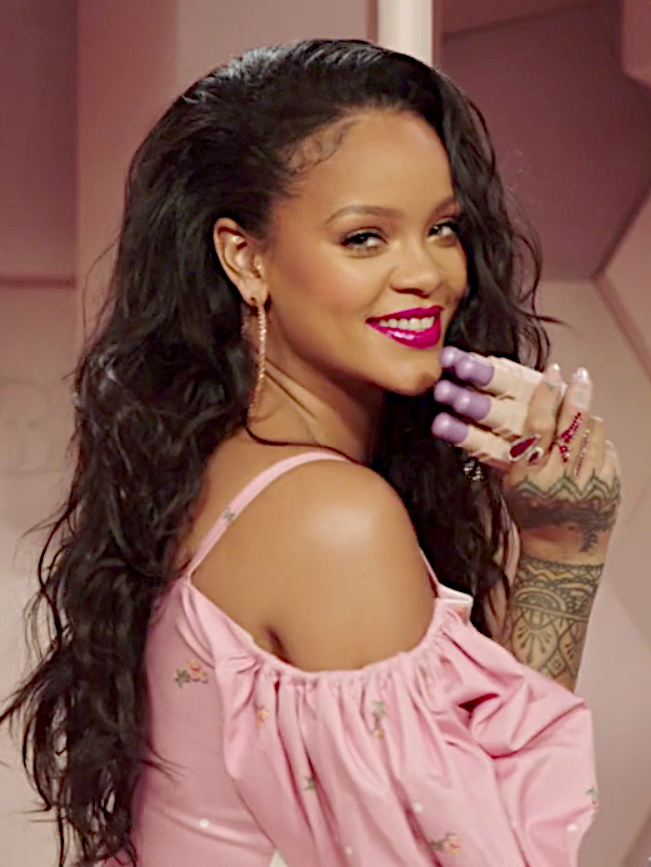
Rihanna

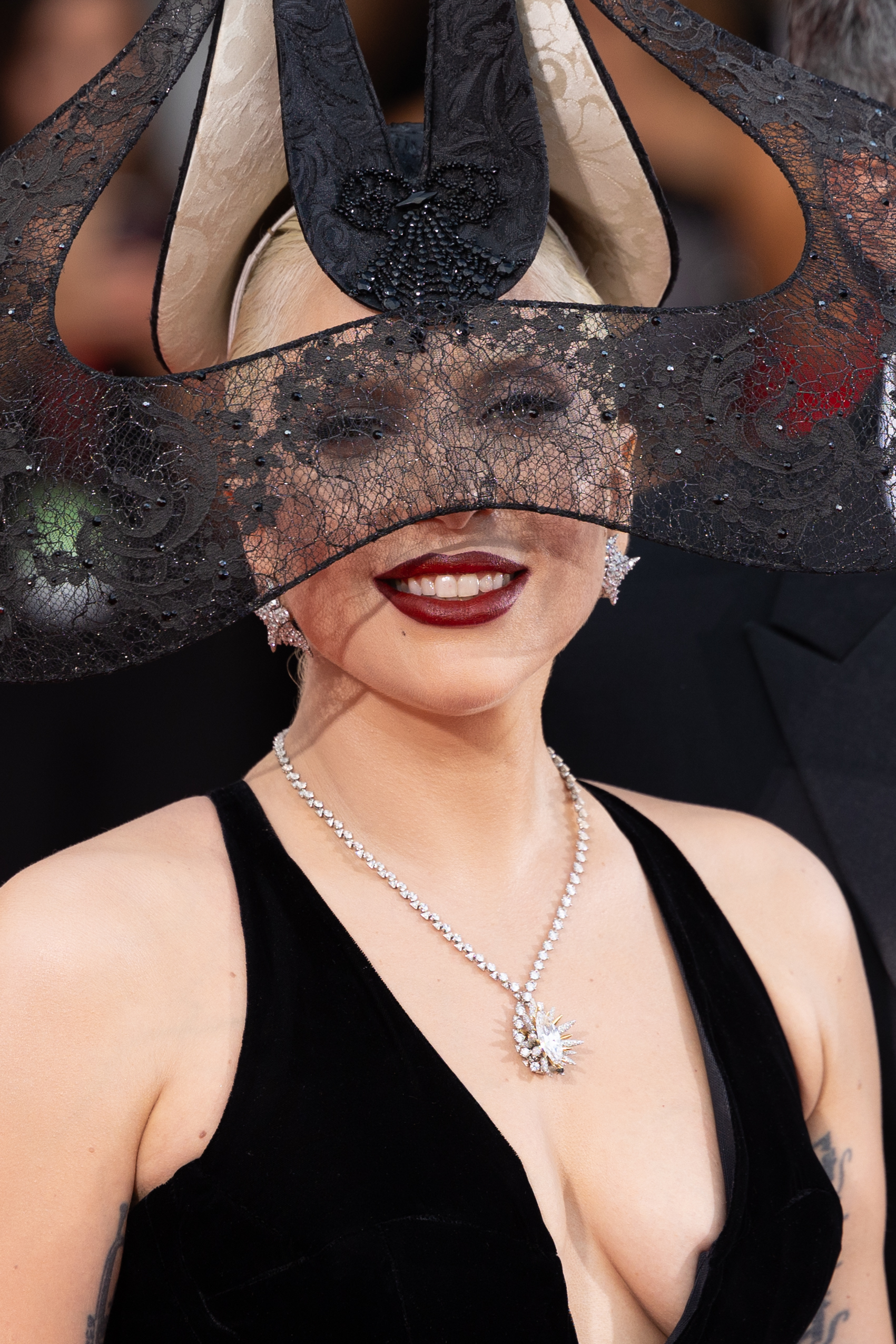
Lady Gaga

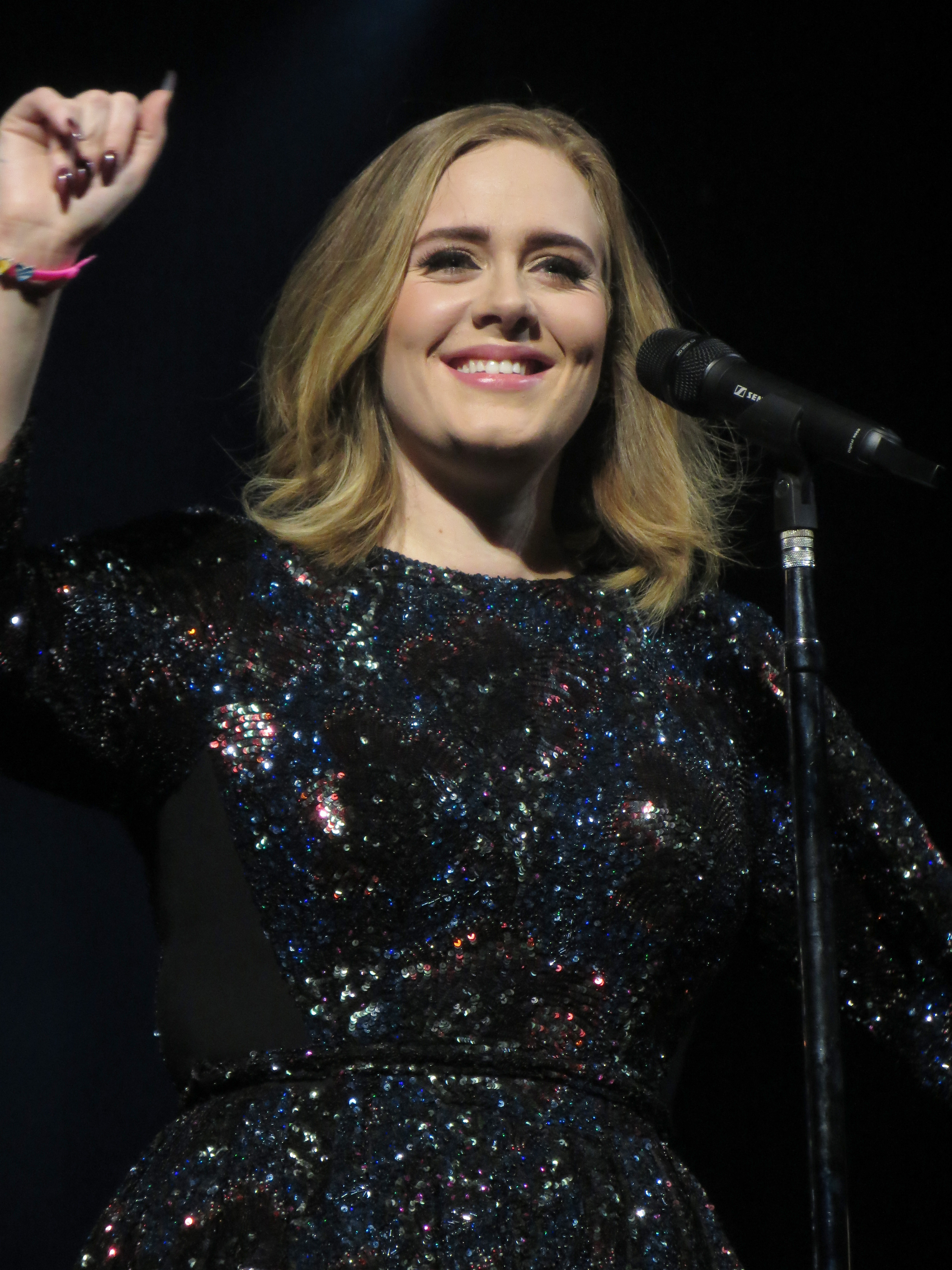
Adele

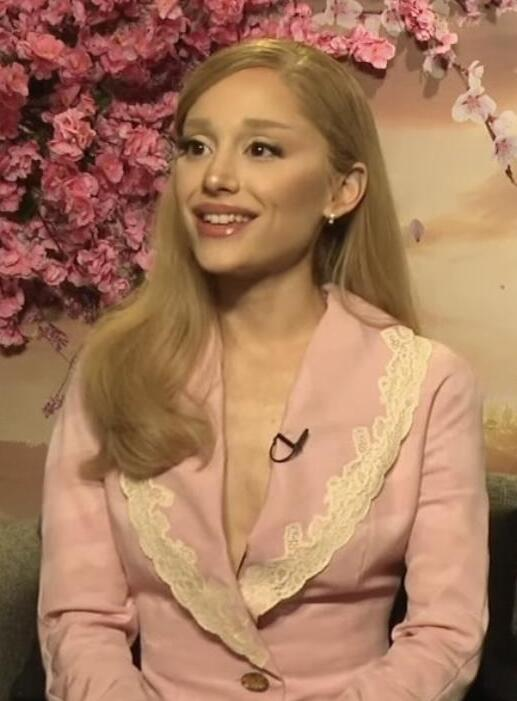
Ariana Grande

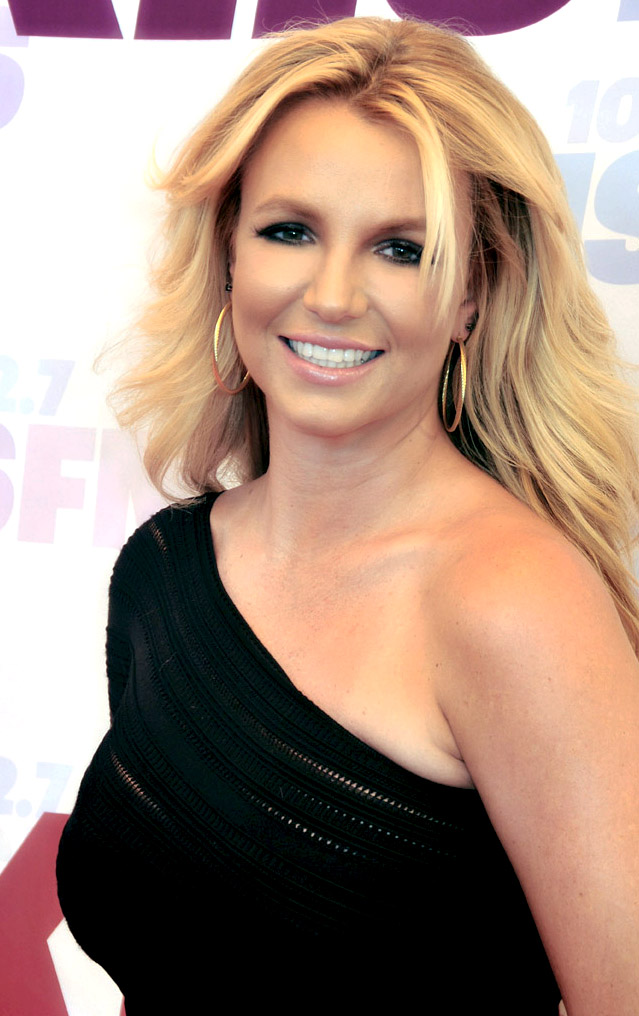
Britney Spears

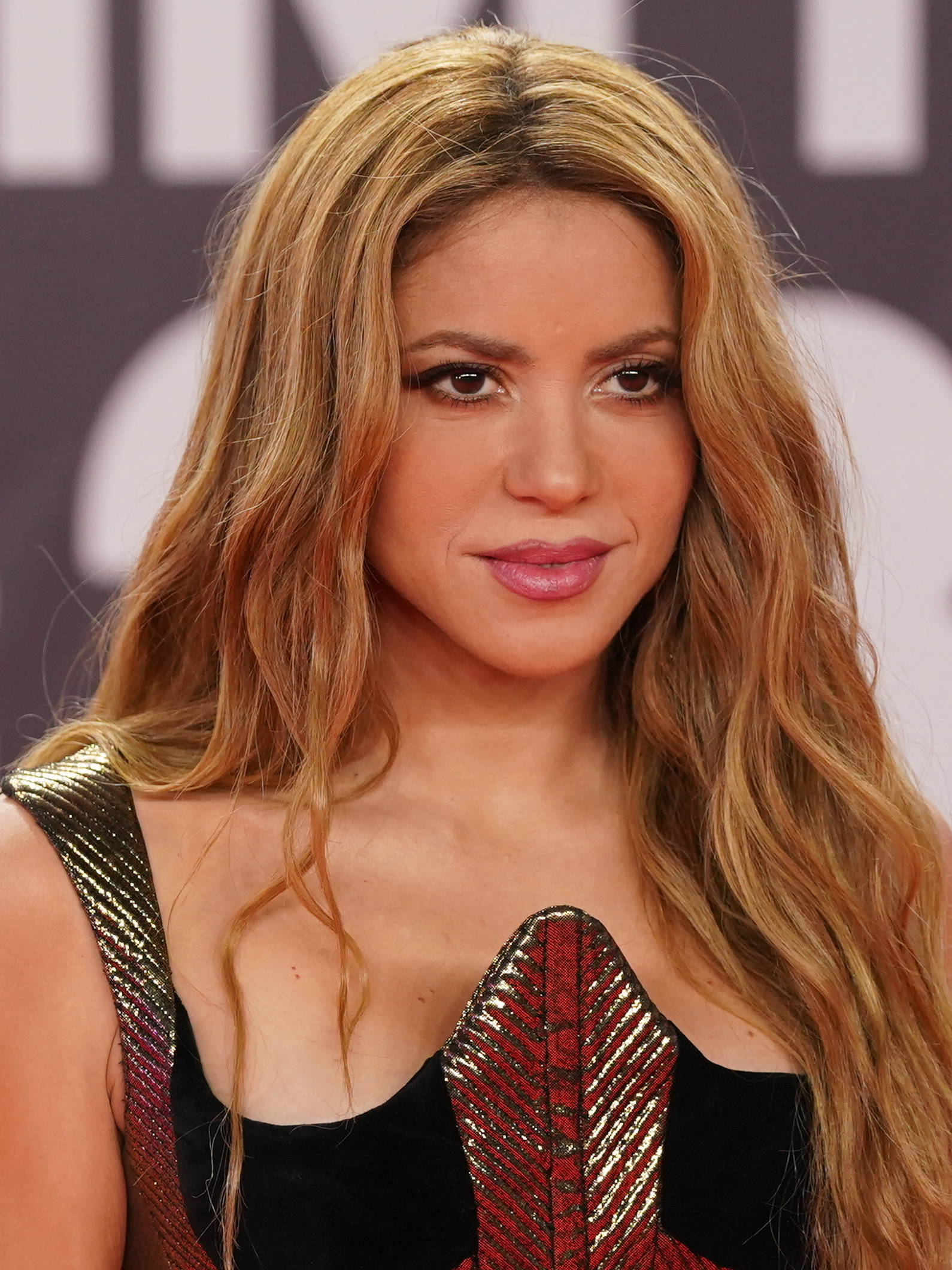
Shakira

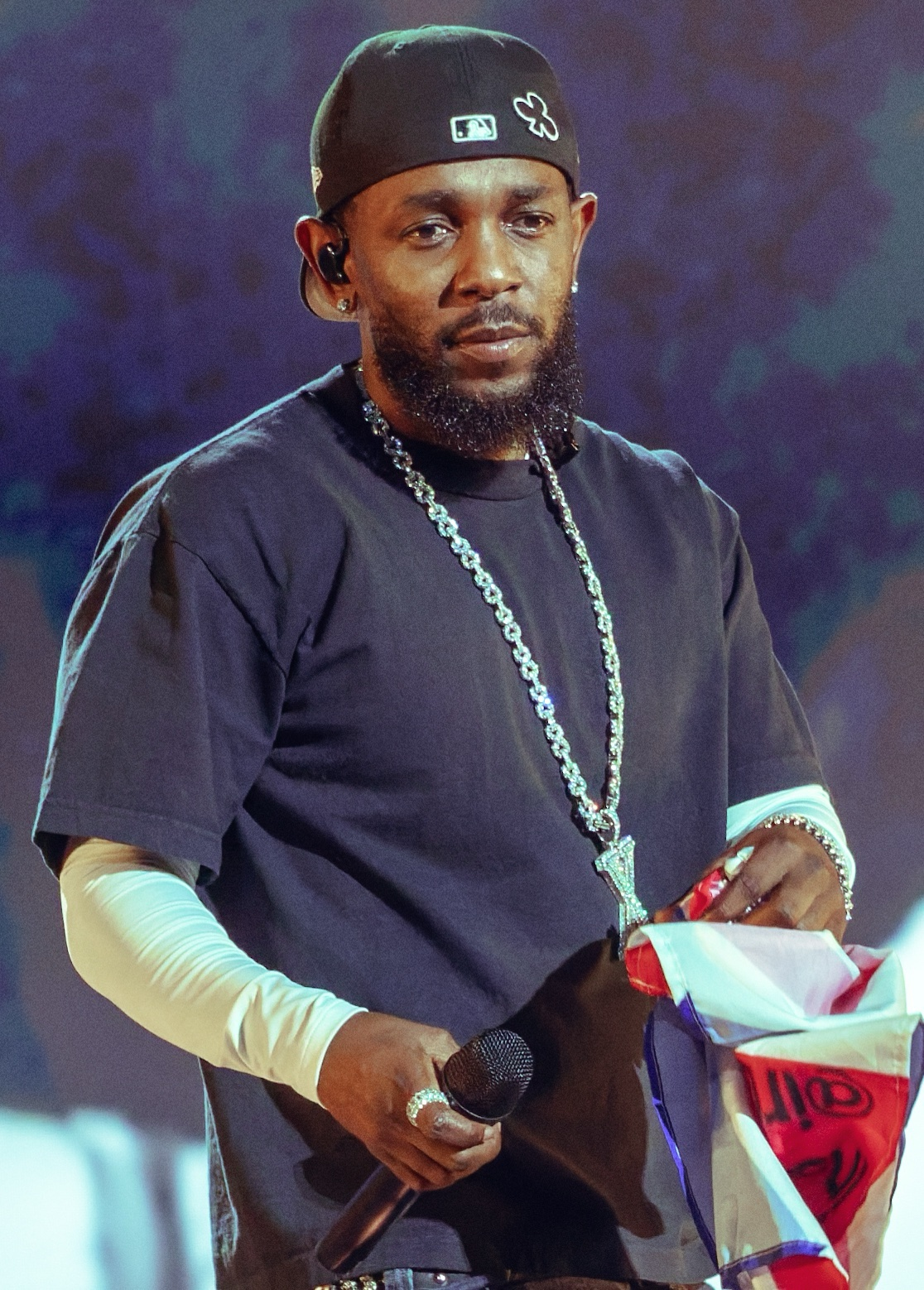
Kendrick Lamar

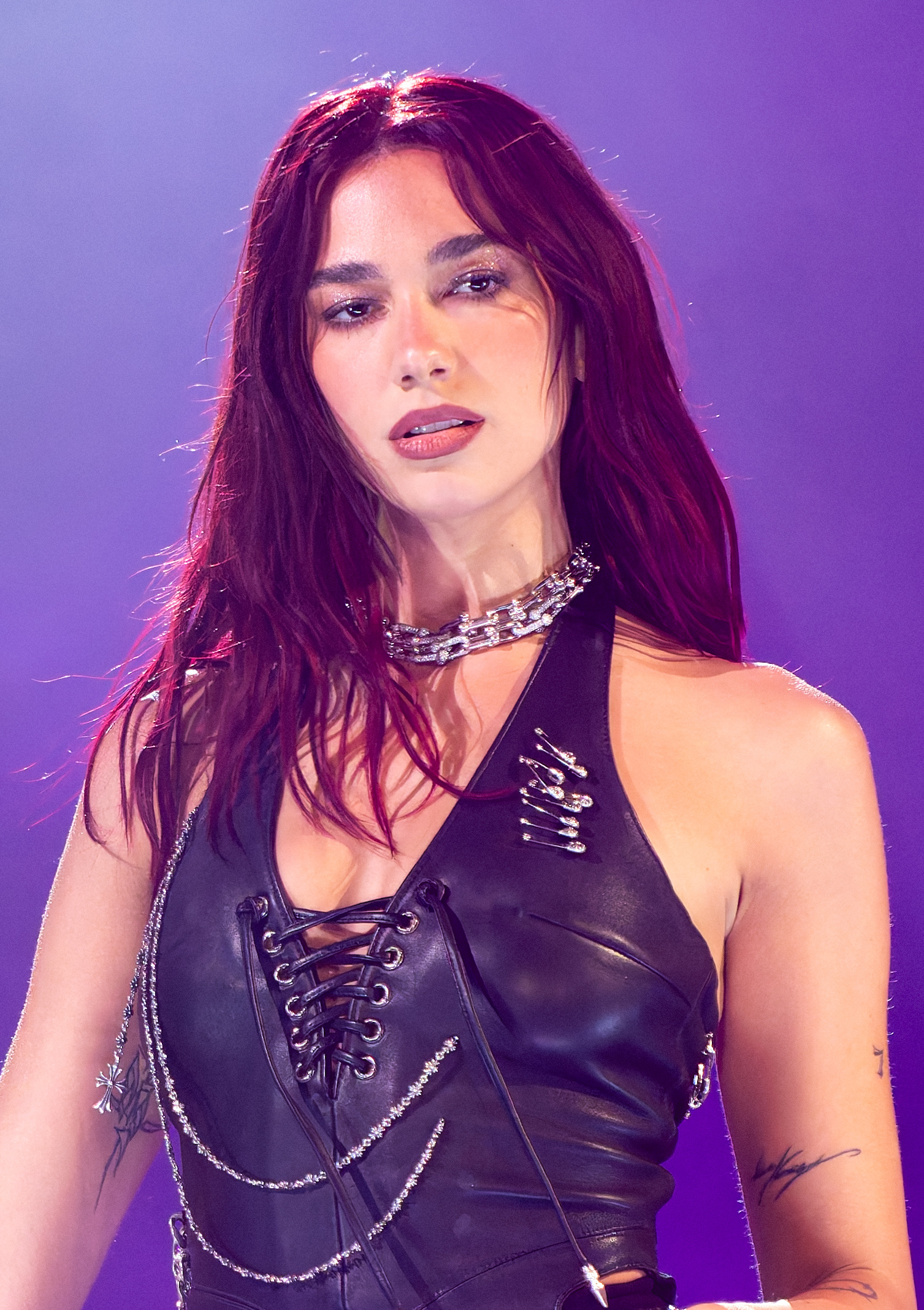
Dua Lipa

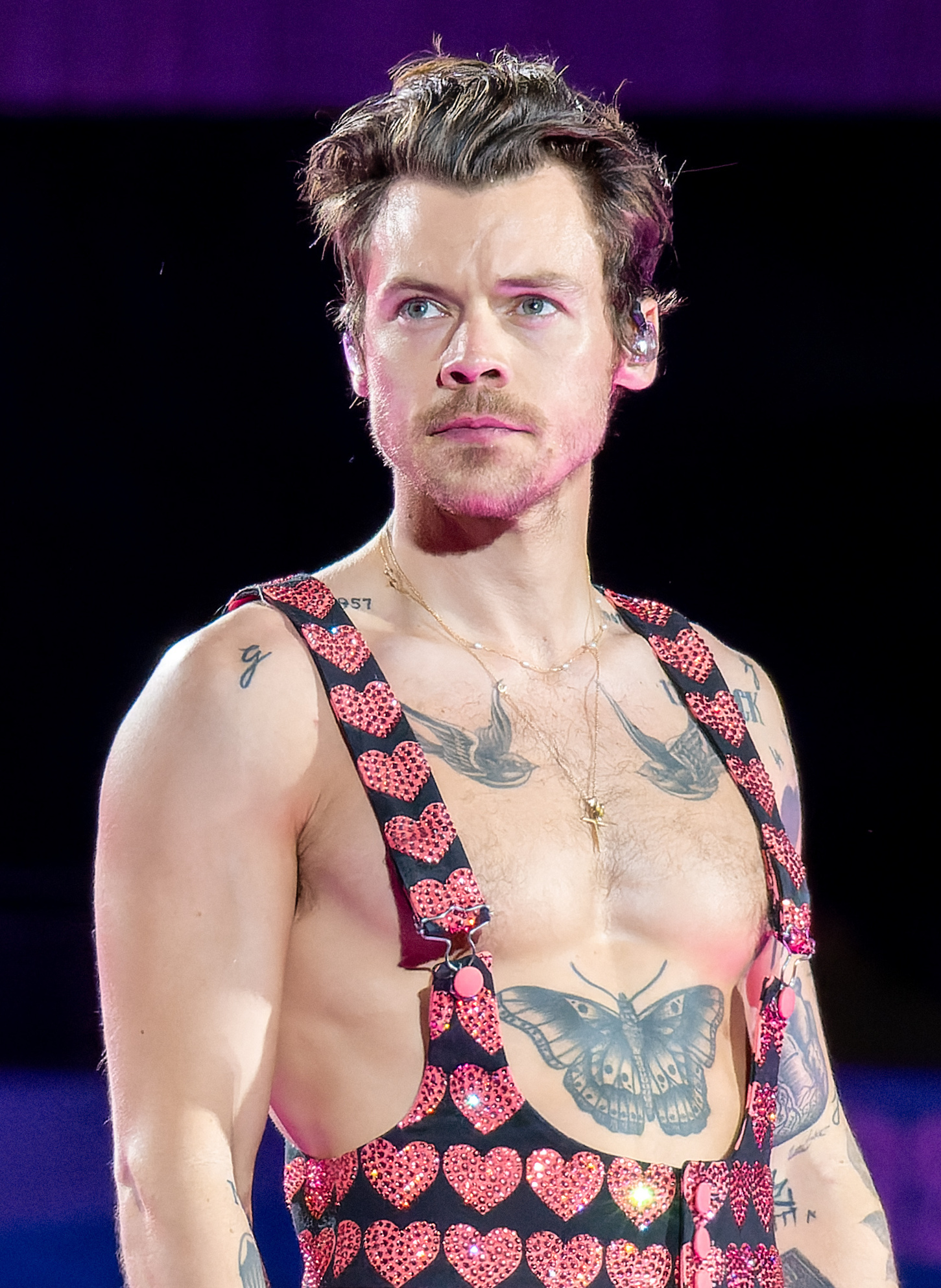
Harry Styles

Zara Larsson

Beyoncé has influenced artists across generations and genres, including those pictured above.

Beyoncé has been cited as an influence by various artists all over the world. These artists include:

- A.C.E
- Adéla
- Adele
- Addison Rae
- Agnez Mo
- Alexandra Burke
- Alexis Jordan
- Amber Riley
- Anitta
- Anne Hathaway
- Ariana Grande
- Ariana Madix
- Ava Max
- Avril Lavigne
- Aya Nakamura
- Ayra Starr
- Bebe Rexha
- Ben Platt
- Brandy
- Brianna Perry
- Bridgit Mendler
- Britney Spears
- Bruno Mars
- BTS
- Camila Cabello
- Cara Delevingne
- Cardi B
- Chance the Rapper
- Chappell Roan
- Charlie Puth
- Cherry Valentine
- Cheryl Cole
- Chloe Bailey
- Chris Martin
- Christina Aguilera
- Ciara
- CL
- Coco Jones
- Dami Im
- Da'Vine Joy Randolph
- Demi Lovato
- Doechii
- Doja Cat
- Dua Lipa
- Ella Mai
- Ellie Goulding
- Emilia Mernes
- Faith Hill
- Faouzia
- Felicity Jones
- Fergie
- FLO
- Gal Gadot
- Girl Ultra
- GloRilla
- Grimes
- Gwyneth Paltrow
- Haim
- Harry Styles
- Hayley Williams
- Hwasa
- Ice Spice
- Iolanda
- Ivi Adamou
- Jacqueline Fernandez
- Jake Zyrus
- Jazmine Sullivan
- J Balvin
- Jess Glynne
- Jessie J
- Jessie Ware
- JoJo
- Juanes
- Kaleen
- Kamille
- Karina
- Karol G
- Katseye
- Katy Perry
- Kelela
- Kelly Rowland
- Kendrick Lamar
- Kesha
- Kevin Moon
- Kim Petras
- Kim Woo-bin
- Kimberley Walsh
- Lady Gaga
- Lainey Wilson
- Lay Bankz
- Leona Lewis
- Lisa
- Little Mix
- Lizzo
- Ludmilla
- Luke James
- Lyodra
- Mary J. Blige
- Megan Thee Stallion
- Meghan Trainor
- Melanie Fiona
- Miley Cyrus
- Miranda Lambert
- Momo Hirai
- Moonbyul
- Nicole Scherzinger
- Nicki Minaj
- Ningning
- Normani
- Olivia Dean
- Olivia Rodrigo
- One Direction
- Park Bom
- Pixie Lott
- Prakriti Kakar
- Queen Latifah
- Raven-Symoné
- Raye
- Regina Ivanova
- Reneé Rapp
- Rihanna
- Rina Sawayama
- Rita Ora
- Rosalía
- Rosé
- Sabrina Carpenter
- Sam Smith
- Sandra Bullock
- Selena Gomez
- Seulgi
- Seohyun
- Shaboozey
- Shakira
- Sienna Spiro
- Slayyyter
- Sooyoung
- Sophia Bush
- Stan Walker
- Stormzy
- Sung Han-bin
- SZA
- Sevyn Streeter
- Tamera Foster
- Tate McRae
- Taylor Swift
- Teyana Taylor
- Tinashe
- Tini Stoessel
- Tóc Tiên
- Tori Kelly
- Troye Sivan
- Tyla
- Usher
- Victoria Monét
- Whitney Houston
- XG (group)
- Zara Larsson
- Zendaya

Taylor Swift described Beyoncé as a major influence and a "guiding light throughout my career", who has "paved the road" and shown how to "break rules and defy industry norms". Lady Gaga explained how Beyoncé gave her the determination to become a musician, recalling seeing her in a Destiny's Child music video and saying: "Oh, she's a star. I want that." Rihanna was inspired to start her singing career after watching Beyoncé, telling etalk that after Beyoncé released Dangerously In Love (2003), "I was like 'wow, I want to be just like that.' She's huge and just an inspiration." Ariana Grande learned to sing by mimicking Beyoncé. Adele cited Beyoncé as her inspiration and favorite artist, telling Vogue: "She's been a huge and constant part of my life as an artist since I was about ten or eleven ... I think she's inspiring. She's beautiful. She's ridiculously talented, and she is one of the kindest people I've ever met ... She makes me want to do things with my life." Both Paul McCartney and Garth Brooks said they watch Beyoncé's performances to get inspiration for their shows, with Brooks saying that when watching one of her performances, "take out your notebook and take notes. No matter how long you've been on the stage – take notes on that one."

== Cultural depictions ==
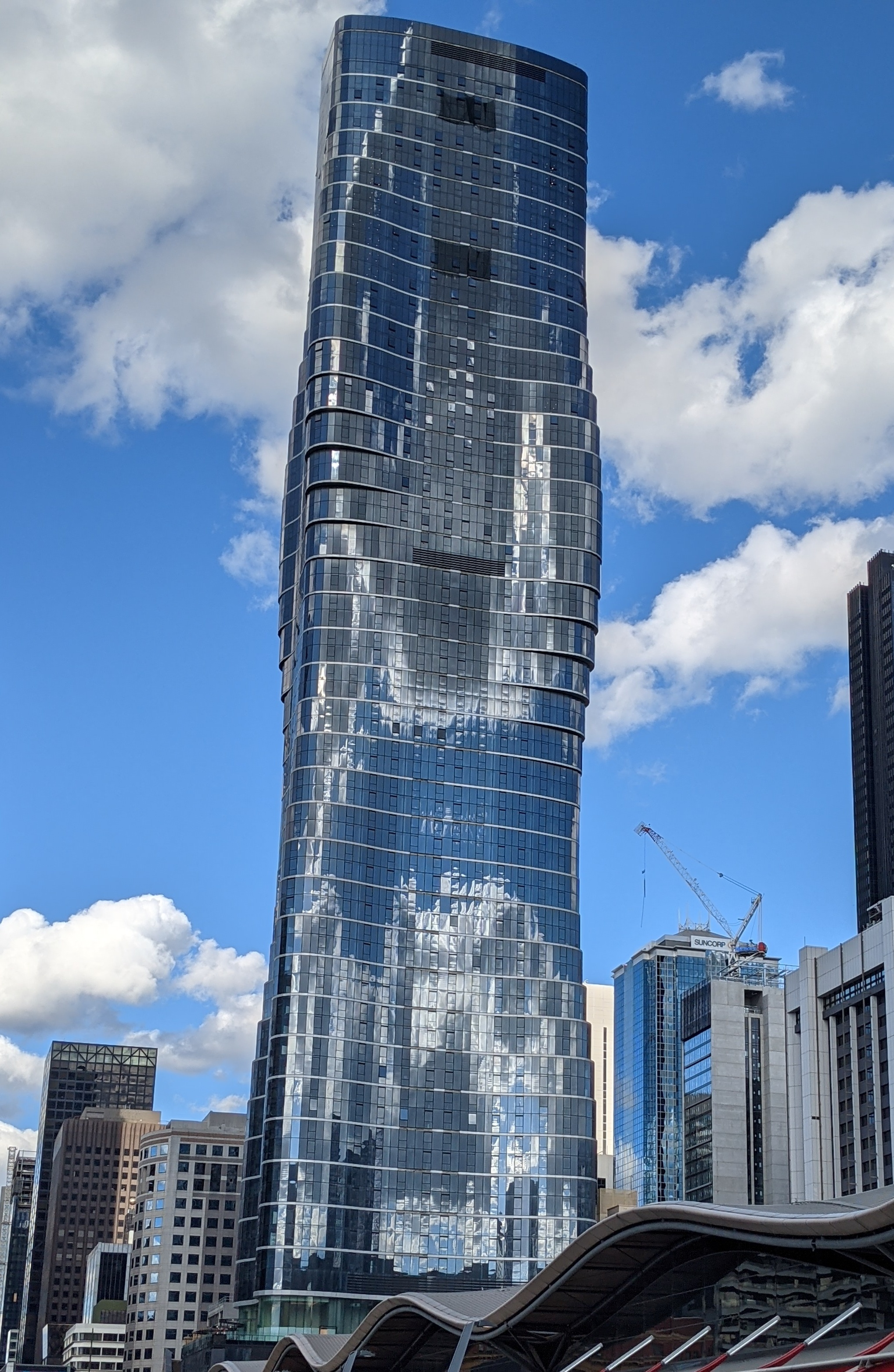
The architecture of the Premier Tower in Melbourne, Australia is designed after Beyoncé.

According to Elenberg Fraser, the Premier Tower's design is reminiscent of Beyoncé's fabric-draped silhouette in the music video for her 2013 song Ghost. Additionally, Beyoncé is represented by numerous wax figures at Madame Tussauds wax museums in major cities all over the world, including New York City, Berlin, Singapore, Tokyo, London, Washington, D.C., Amsterdam, Bangkok, Hollywood Sydney, Istanbul, Blackpool, Las Vegas, Orlando, San Francisco, Nashville, Budapest, Vienna, Shanghai and Delhi.

The latest was unveiled by Madame Tussauds New York on July 27, 2023, showcasing Beyoncé's look from her historic 2018 Coachella performance. Debuted at Edge, New York City's highest outdoor sky deck, the figure features Beyoncé in a Balmain bodysuit and Nefertiti-inspired headpiece, commemorating her as the first Black woman to headline the festival. This addition involved extensive collaboration with the original designers, requiring six months to capture Beyoncé's signature style precisely.

== Museums and exhibitions ==
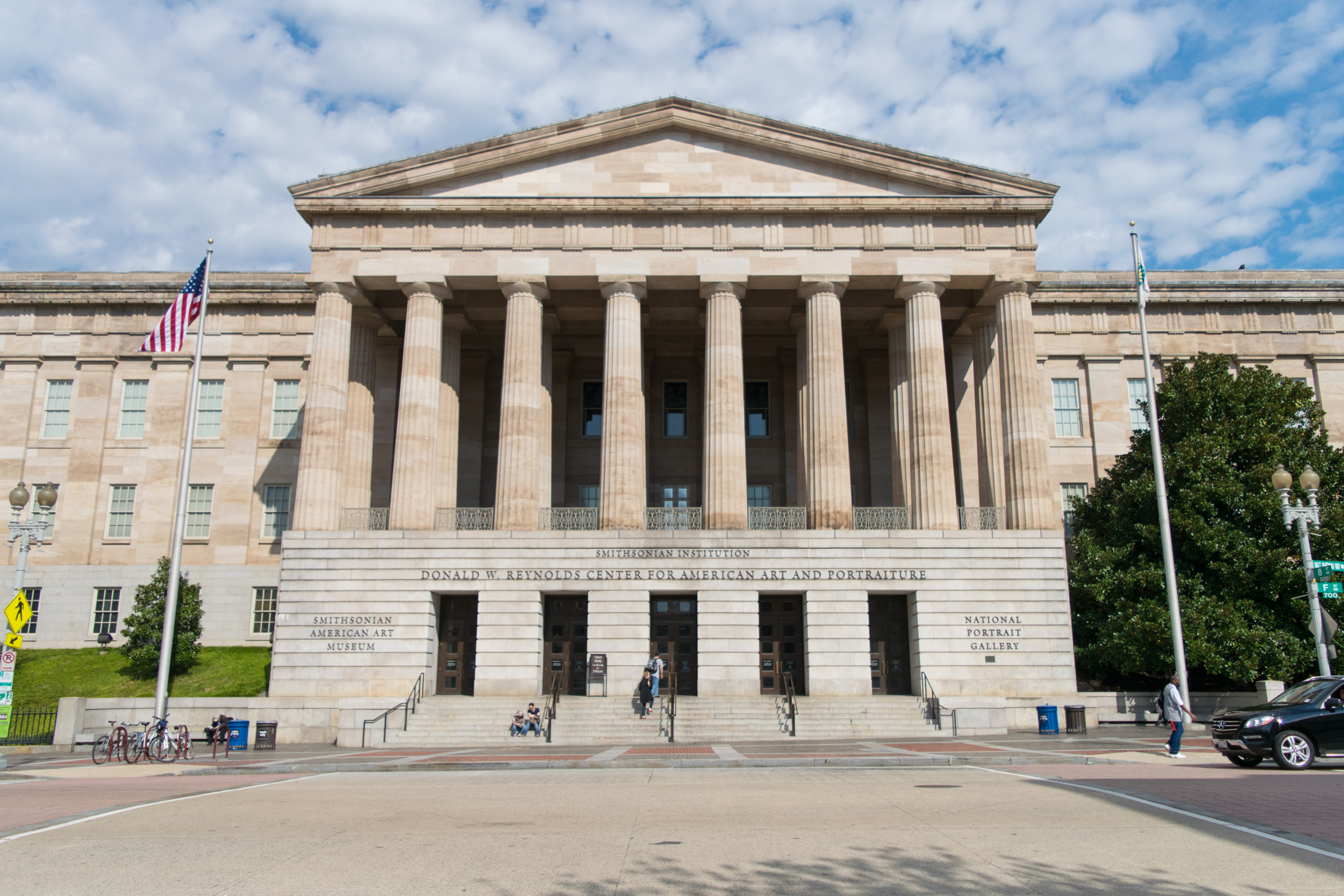
The Smithsonian National Portrait Gallery contains four portraits of Beyoncé.

Beyoncé's work, costumes and portraits have featured in prestigious museums globally, including:

- Smithsonian National Portrait Gallery, Washington, DC, US
  - Beyoncé Knowles (2003) – A promotional poster for Beyoncé's debut album Dangerously In Love, found in the "20th Century Americans: 2000 to Present" gallery
  - See Your Halo (2019) – A portrait of Beyoncé for Vogue's September issue, by Tyler Mitchell. The museum said the acquisition fulfills its mission "to tell the story of America by portraying the people who shape this nation's history, development, and culture".
  - Beyoncé (2019) – A portrait of Beyoncé with a floral headdress for Vogue's September issue, by Tyler Mitchell
  - Beyoncé (2019) – A portrait of Beyoncé holding a drape for Vogue's September issue, by Tyler Mitchell
- Metropolitan Museum of Art, New York, US
  - Homecoming: A Film by Beyoncé (2019) – 4-minute excerpt of the concert film and documentary directed and produced by Beyoncé
  - Plate: Beyoncé (2021) – Ceramic plate depicting Beyoncé by Roberto Lugo
- National Museum of African American History and Culture, Washington, DC, US
  - Costume worn by Beyoncé as Deena Jones in the film Dreamgirls (2006) – A set of clothing items worn by Beyoncé in Dreamgirls
  - Latex Ball, Manhattan, NY, 2011 (2011) – A photographic print depicting ephemera at the 2011 Latex Ball, including posters for Beyoncé's album 4
  - Sign from Women's March on Washington with "When you hurt me you hurt yourself" – Handwritten poster from the 2017 Women's March with lyrics from Beyoncé's song "Don't Hurt Yourself"
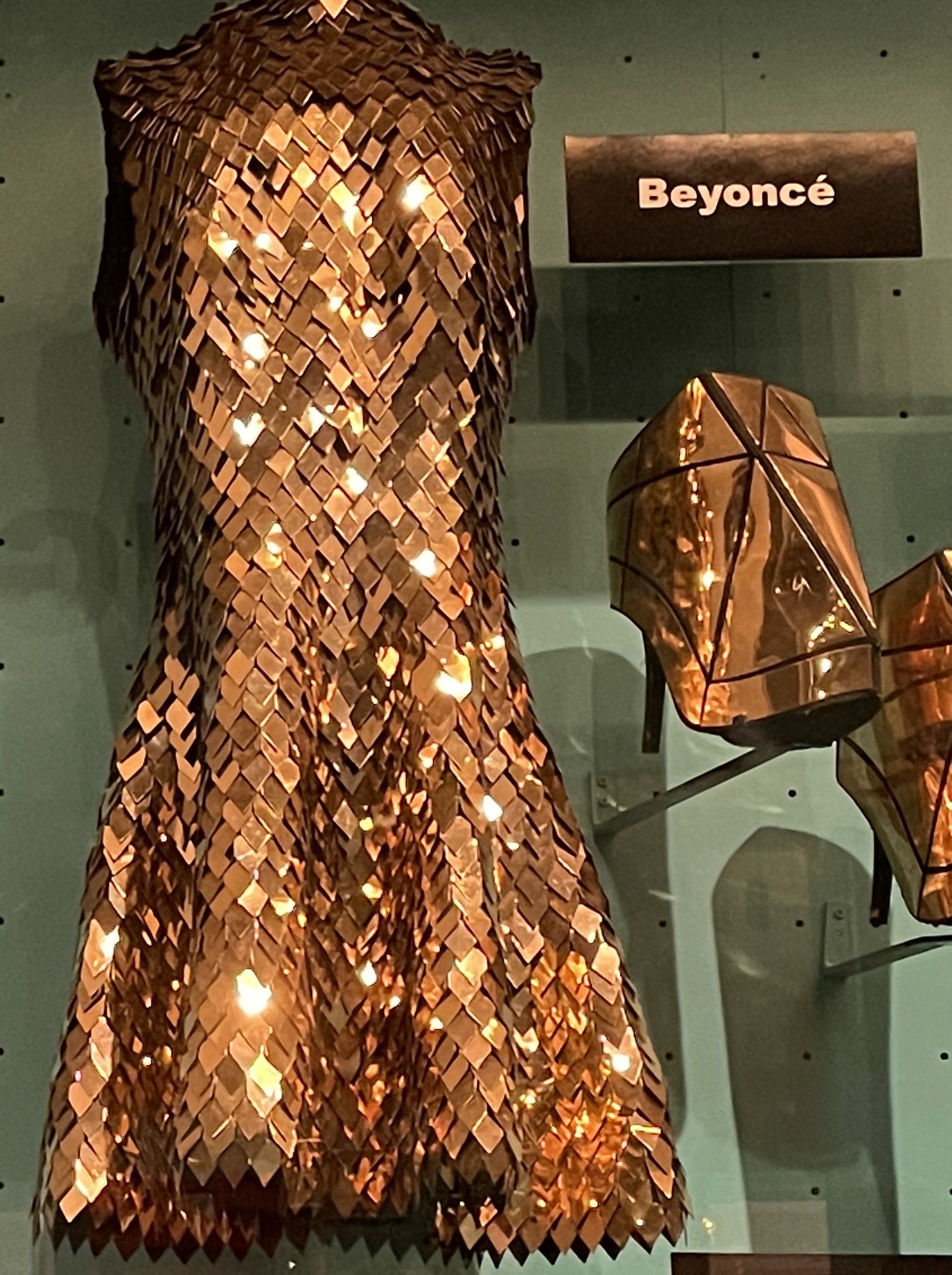
    Beyoncé's outfit from the "Run the World (Girls)" video on display in the Rock and Roll Hall of Fame and Museum
- Rock and Roll Hall of Fame and Museum, US – "Legends of Rock" gallery
  - White tank top and denim shorts from the "Crazy in Love" music video (2003)
  - Black leotard from the "Single Ladies (Put a Ring on It)" music video (2008)
  - Gold Thierry Mugler bodysuit from the "Sweet Dreams" music video (2009)
  - Gold Gareth Pugh dress from the "Run The World (Girls)" music video (2011)
  - Black Givenchy gown from the Met Gala (2012)
  - Lace bodysuit from the Super Bowl XLVII halftime show (2013)
- Victoria and Albert Museum, London, UK
  - Ballgown (2012) – Sequined Ralph & Russo outfit worn by Beyoncé for her Revel Presents residency
  - Papillon' ring by G (2014) – "Gifted to the museum by Beyoncé, an international icon of the modern world, and one of the most successful music performers of all time, the ring joins a collection of jewels associated with some of history's most notable women including Elizabeth I, Catherine the Great, Queen Victoria and the Empress Josephine."
  - Brass and Crystal Headdress (2010) – Headdress created by Vicki Sarge for Beyoncé's 90th anniversary cover of the magazine L’Officiel
  - Headpiece (2020) & Belt (2020) – Cowrie shell clothing by Lafalaise Dion popularized by Beyoncé in Black Is King
  - Jama – Tongoro jumpsuit popularized by Beyoncé in Black Is King
  - Daria (2019) – Pink Molly Goddard gown worn by Beyoncé in Black Is King
  - Tribute (2014) – Black Yves Saint Laurent high-heeled platform sandals worn by Beyoncé
  - Costume (2020) – A costume made in the style of Beyoncé for the character of Catherine of Aragon in the musical Six
- Musée des Arts Décoratifs, the Louvre, Paris, France
  - Heliosphere dress by Iris van Herpen, worn at the Renaissance World Tour (2023)
  - Schiaparelli dress worn by Beyoncé for British Vogue (2022)
  - Schiaparelli dress worn by Beyoncé at the 63rd Annual Grammy Awards (2021)
  - Schiaparelli dress worn by Beyoncé at the 77th Golden Globe Awards (2020)

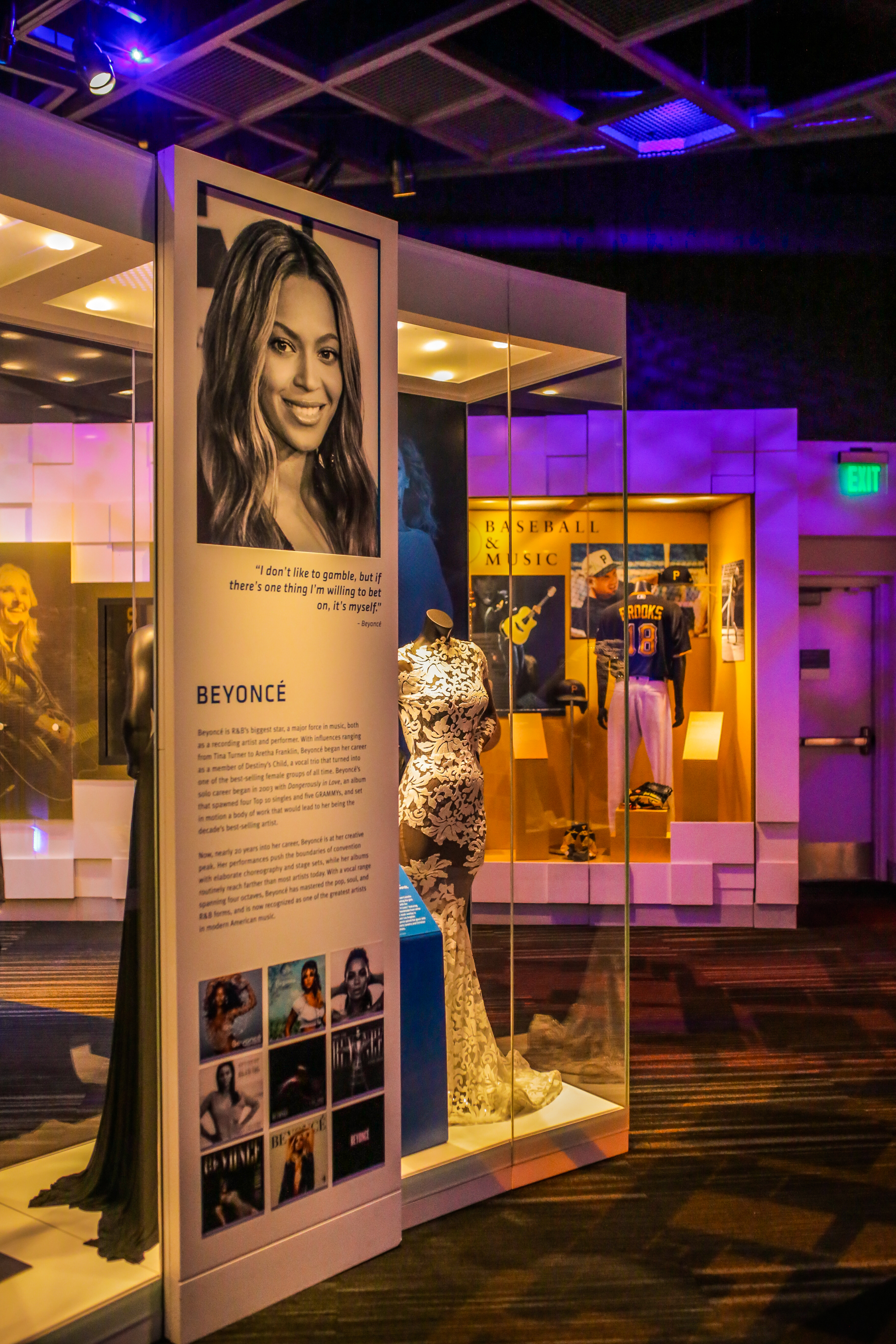
The Beyoncé exhibit at the Grammy Museum describes her as "one of the greatest artists in modern American music".

- Grammy Museum, US
  - Pink dress worn by Beyoncé for her performance with Prince at the 46th Annual Grammy Awards (2004)
  - White dress worn by Beyoncé at the 56th Annual Grammy Awards (2014)
  - Black outfit worn by Beyoncé for her performance at Stevie Wonder: Songs In The Key Of Life — An All-Star GRAMMY Salute (2015)
- National Museum of American History, Washington, DC, US
  - Jacket worn by Beyoncé in "Austin Powers in Goldmember" (2001)
  - Orange plastic pants worn by Beyoncé in "Austin Powers in Goldmember" (2001)
  - Orange halter-top worn by Beyoncé in "Austin Powers in Goldmember" (2001)
  - Austin Powers in Goldmember costume worn by Beyoncé
- Museum of Pop Culture, US
  - Video exhibit on the worldwide impact of the "Single Ladies (Put a Ring on It)" music video (2008)
  - White suit worn by Beyoncé in the "Upgrade U" music video (2006)
- National Museum of African American Music, US
  - Exhibit on Beyoncé and her impact as a leading cultural figure
- Texas Music Museum, US
  - Permanent exhibit on Beyoncé's career and cultural impact
- Museon, The Netherlands
  - Music!: From Beethoven to Beyoncé – Exhibition on the history of music, featuring the work of Beyoncé
- Museum of Science, US
  - The Beyoncé Experience (2022) – Multi-media experience that celebrates the music of Beyoncé at the Charles Hayden Planetarium
- Kensington Palace, London, UK – "Crown to Couture" exhibit
  - Gold outfit worn by Beyoncé at the 59th Annual Grammy Awards (2017)
- Academy Museum of Motion Pictures, US
  - Dress worn by Beyoncé as Deena Jones in Dreamgirls
- American Museum of Natural History, US
  - Nail rings worn by Beyoncé in the "Sweet Dreams" music video (2009)
- Calouste Gulbenkian Museum, Portugal – Superstar Pharaohs
  - Yellow hoodie from Beyoncé's 2018 Coachella performance
- Montreal Museum of Fine Arts, Canada – Thierry Mugler: Couturissime
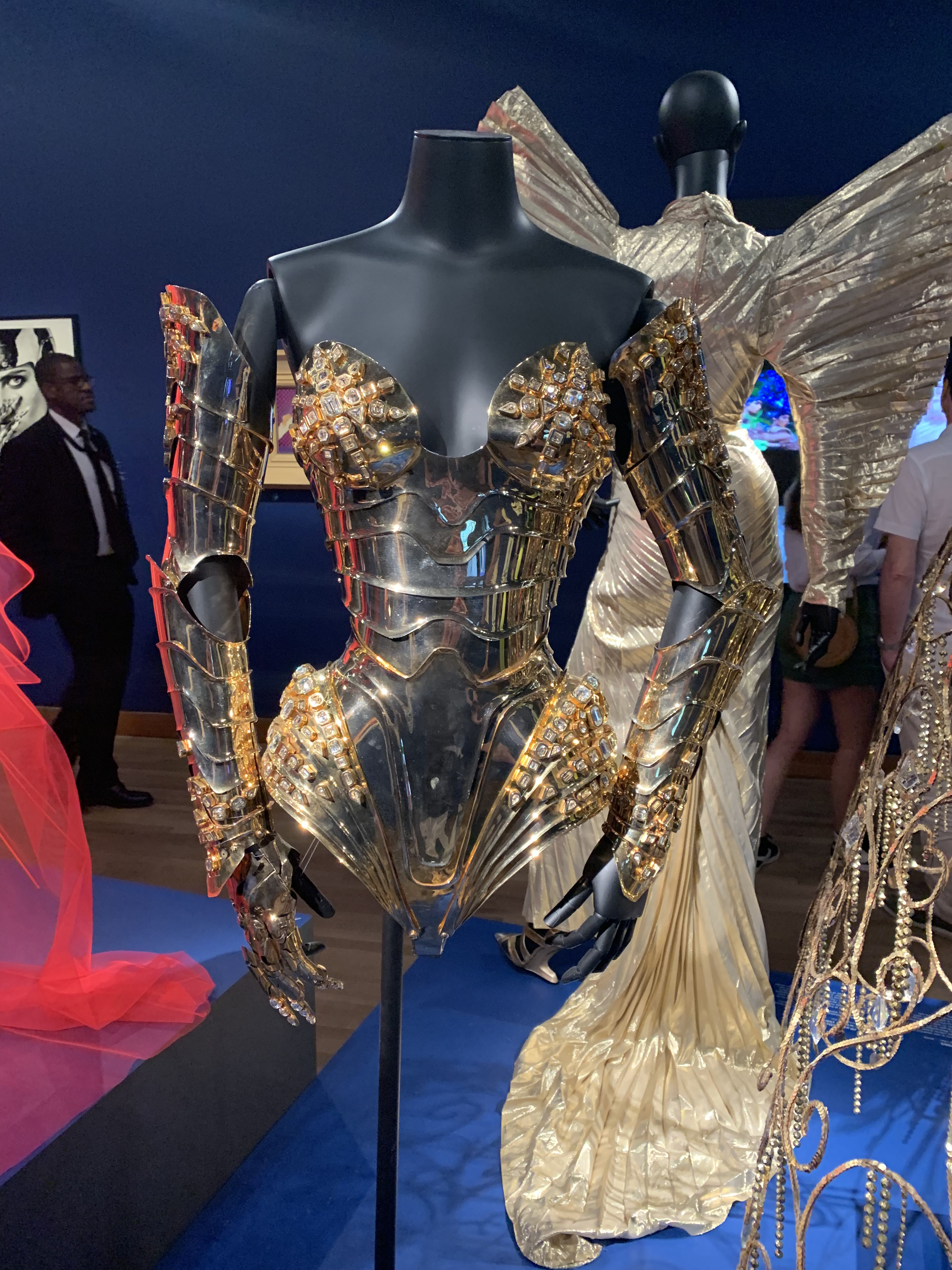
  Beyoncé's Thierry Mugler-designed outfit from the "Sweet Dreams" video on display at the Montreal Museum of Fine Arts
  - Gold outfit from the "Sweet Dreams" music video (2009)
  - Black outfit from the "Diva" music video (2009)
  - Several outfits from the I Am... World Tour (2009)
- Brooklyn Museum, US – The Fashion World of Jean Paul Gaultier
  - Outfit from the "Video Phone" music video (2009)
  - Outfit from the I Am... Yours residency (2009)
- Kunsthalle Bremen, Germany – Icons: Worship and Adoration
  - Depiction of Beyoncé in the "Apeshit" music video (2018), as an example of "how the concept of the icon unites aspects of the sacred, worship and the idea of transcendence"
- Centre National du Costume de Scene, France
  - Gold corset worn by Beyoncé for The Mrs Carter Show World Tour (2013)
- Foundling Museum, UK – Portraying Pregnancy: From Holbein to Social Media
  - I Have Three Hearts (2017) – Portrait by Awol Erizku announcing Beyoncé's second pregnancy, described as "the most important contemporary depiction of pregnancy in art history" and "a new precedent for women finding empowerment through portraits of their pregnancy"
- The Museum at the Fashion Institute of Technology – Fresh, Fly and Fabulous - Fifty Years of Hip-Hop
  - MCM bustier worn by Beyoncé in the "Apeshit" music video (2018)
- Amon Carter Museum of American Art, US – Cowboy
  - Exhibition running from 2024-2025 that explores diversity within Western culture, inspired by Beyoncé's album Cowboy Carter
- Museum of Fine Arts, US – Icons of Style: A Century of Fashion Photography
  - Portrait of Beyoncé from Vogue's September 2019 issue
- Sadie Coles HQ
  - Beyoncé (2014) – A series of pop art portraits of Beyoncé by Jonathan Horowitz, reminiscent of Andy Warhol's portraits of Marilyn Monroe
- Rijksmuseum van Oudheden, The Netherlands
  - Portrait of Beyoncé from Homecoming: A Film by Beyoncé (2019)
- Museum of Australian Democracy, Australia
  - DressUP: Change The World – Exhibit that allowed visitors to dress up in Beyoncé's costumes
- Rochester Museum and Science Center, US
  - Laser Beyoncé (2024) – Multi-media laser exhibition set to the music of Beyoncé at the Strasenburgh Planetarium
- Museum voor Religieuze Kunst, The Netherlands
  - Coronation of the Virgin (2020) – Triptych painting by Mathijs Vissers depicting Beyoncé as a Virgin Mary-like figure
- Contemporary Jewish Museum, US
  - Levi Strauss jeans worn by Beyoncé at the 2001 MTV Video Music Awards
- Indianapolis Museum of Art, US
  - Atlantican Archives: A Group of Beyoncés Founded Earth Feminism (2023) – Textile art piece featuring images of Beyoncé's face on a suffragette poster
- Museum of Sex, US
  - Bullet bra worn by Beyoncé in the "Sorry" music video (2016)
- SCAD Museum of Art, US
  - Red Oscar de la Renta dress worn by Beyoncé for Vogue (2013)
  - Michael Cinco cape worn by Beyoncé in the "Haunted" music video (2013)
- Nevada Museum of Art, US – World Stage
  - Collage print of Beyoncé by Mildred Howard
- Jewish Museum of Florida-FIU, US
  - "Bills purse" created by Judith Leiber for Beyoncé
- African American Museum – Hair Story
  - A series of depictions of Beyoncé's hairstyles from Black Is King (2020)
- Museum Jan, The Netherlands
  - "Miss Honey" earrings worn by Beyoncé for her album Renaissance

== Academic study ==
Beyoncé's work, career and advocacy have been the subject of college and university courses across the world.

List of courses on Beyoncé offered by select educational institutions
Institution	Course title(s)	Course description(s)	Ref.
Harvard University	The Curious Case of ‘Beyoncé’ the Album	Harvard Business School Marketing Case detailing the under-wraps conception, associated business deals, label meetings, and execution of the surprise release of Beyoncé's Self-Titled album from the perspective of her company Parkwood Entertainment	
Harvard University	Beyoncé Feminism, Rihanna Womanism	Exploration of how the actions of Beyoncé and Rihanna have reflected aspects of Black feminism	
Harvard University	Introduction to Western Art Music, From Bach to Beyoncé	Introduction to a variety of art music repertories, focusing on the critical roles played by renowned female performers and artists of color	
Harvard University	Black Is Queen: The Divine Feminine in Kush	Uses songs from Black Is King (2020) to explore the high status of women in the Nubian Kingdom of Kush	
Harvard University	The Lemon Drop	Investigation of the complexities and artistic elements of Lemonade	
Harvard University	American Requiem: Beyoncé, Benefits and the Gap Between Promise and Delivery	Uses Cowboy Carter to study why government assistance programs often fail to deliver for those they are meant to help	
Yale University	Beyoncé Makes History: Black Radical Tradition History, Culture, Theory & Politics through Music	Examination of Beyoncé's artistic work from 2013 to 2024 as a lens to study Black history, intellectual thought and performance, exploring how she has generated awareness and engagement in social and political ideologies	
Princeton University	Black Women in Popular Music Culture	An examination of Black women’s contributions to popular music culture from the late 19th century to the present; included a section on the cultural impact of Beyoncé	
Stanford University	Identity in the American Imagination	From Sally Hemings to Michelle Obama and Beyoncé, this course explores the ways that racial identity has been experienced, represented, and contested throughout American history	
University of Pennsylvania	Beyoncé, Protest, and Popular Music	A closer look at Beyoncé's career to question how gender and race circulate in contemporary popular music	
University of Pennsylvania	Family Feuds: Beyoncé, Jay-Z, and Solange and the Meaning of American Music	Taking these artists' albums as a point of departure, this class will focus on the role of popular music as "politics" within contemporary American culture	
Cornell University	Beyoncé Nation	An academic study that examined Beyoncé's Southern heritage and the influence of her music on the movement of black feminism	
Cornell University	Gospel and The Blues: A Black Women’s History II, 1973–2023	Course exploring Black women’s experiences through gospel and blues music, examining themes of joy, resistance, identity and cultural history through artists including Beyoncé	
New York University	Topics in Recorded Music: Beyoncé	Examines Beyoncé’s rise as a songwriter, performer, entrepreneur, activist, and multi-genre artist within the larger history of 21st-century popular music and culture	
University of Southern California	The Business of Beyoncé	MBA course at the Marshall School of Business using Beyoncé’s career to teach aspiring music and entertainment industry leaders about brand development, creative ownership and business strategy	
University of Michigan Law School	Lemonade: Race, Resilience, and… Beyoncé	Mini-seminar using Beyoncé’s music and visual storytelling to explore critical race theory and what they reveal about law, race, and justice	
University of Maryland	Make Some Noise: Black Protest Music Since 1964	A 3-credit course that studies Beyoncé alongside Nina Simone, Aretha Franklin, Lauryn Hill, Kendrick Lamar and more through the history of Black protest music	
McMaster University	Beyoncé Studies: Creativity, Celebrity, and Activism	This course takes up the provocations of Beychella, Lemonade, and other musical, performative, and digital work by Beyoncé to examine the debates about creativity, feminism, antiracism, neoliberalism and liberation	
University of Houston	Before Cowboy Carter: Black Towns, Black Freedom	Uses Beyoncé's Cowboy Carter as a launching pad to discuss the forgotten Black history of the American West	
University of Louisville	Beyond Beyoncé: Communication of an Icon	Study of Beyoncé's impact on modern society	
University of Waterloo	Gender and Performance (DRAMA 282)	Explored Beyoncé's influence and impact, focusing on her 2013 Self-titled album.	
University of Victoria	Beyoncé Course	Explored how Beyoncé's music has impacted society.	
University of Texas at San Antonio	Black Women, Beyoncé & Popular Culture	Focus on black feminism, female empowerment, and racial tension in the United States	
Rutgers University	Politicizing Beyoncé	Course focused on her artistry and image as an access point for the study of Black feminist works on race, gender, and sexuality	
University of Tennessee at Chattanooga	Lemonade Week	A curriculum that highlighted discussions surrounding feminism, stage performances, celebrations of African-American women in literature and poetry, along with dance tutorial classes	
University of Arkansas	Beyoncé and Black Feminism	A course that analysed the influence of Black feminism on Beyoncé and Lemonade	
Michigan State University	Encompass: A Discussion of Beyonce's Lemonade	Exchanging viewpoints and exploring the lived experiences of underrepresented and marginalized communities	
Chapman University	Beyoncé, Madonna, Nina Simone	This course brings these three artists from different generations together, situating their work historically, within contemporary critical discussions around race/gender/sexuality and cultural appropriation	
Chatham University	Lemonade Week	A workshop devoted to Lemonade, allowing learners to explore their relationships with the different power systems that impact their lives.	
Texas Christian University	Beyonce and Intersectionality	This honors course uses contemporary music icon Beyoncé Knowles-Carter as a lens to examine academic ideas of intersectionality and black feminist thought	
University of North Georgia	Okay, Ladies, Now Let’s Get in Formation: Intersectional Feminism in Beyoncé’s Lemonade	An exploration of intersectional feminism through Beyoncé’s music, lyrics and visuals	
Valdosta State University	Black Women in Modern America	A study delving into the diverse themes illustrated in "Lemonade," encompassing aspects of Black identity, feminist perspectives, infidelity in marriage, the bonds of sisterhood, and elements of faith.	
Seminole State College of Florida	The Lemonade Reader: Beyoncé, Black Feminism and Spirituality	How Beyoncé embodies the conjure woman in her iconic audiovisual work Lemonade as a contemporary	
University of Texas at Austin	Beyoncé in Formation: Remixing Black Feminism	This research examines Beyoncé's visual album, Lemonade, through the lens of Black women's sexuality and gender dynamics	
University of Albany	Lemonade Lessons: Beyoncé’s Feminism and the Art of Visual-Album Storytelling	This initiative fosters classroom discussions and assignments to deepen conversations about Blackness, womanhood, and feminism	
University of Copenhagen	Beyoncé, Gender and Race	A course that explores gender, sexuality, and race, while analyzing the essence of feminism as conveyed through Beyoncé's lyrics, videos, and performances	
École Normale Supérieure – PSL (ENS Paris)	Beyoncé: nuances of a cultural icon	A seminar aims to examine the challenges posed by Beyoncé's artistic direction through a multidisciplinary lens, integrating aspects of art history, contemporary literature, history, and philosophy	
University of Massachusetts Amherst	Beyoncé: the Myth, the Music, and the Money	This course examines Beyoncé's artistic contributions and life to explore themes of gender, race, class, and identity, addressing broader questions about popular culture, art, and societal context	
University of Massachusetts Amherst	The Power of Black Music	Ethnomusicology course on Black musical traditions across Africa and the diaspora; includes Beyoncé’s Lemonade and Black Is King	
Prairie View A&M University	Renaissance-A Queer Syllabus	Academic work that emphasizes LGBTQ+ history and theory, as well as feminism and diversity	
Widener University	Focusing On All Things on Beyoncé	Exploring Beyoncé's influence on African-American culture	
Vanderbilt University	Beyoncé: Epic Artist, Feminist Icon	Examines Beyoncé’s rise, cultural impact, and politics.	
Skidmore College	Becoming Beyoncé	Course using Beyoncé’s career as a lens for politics, transnational feminism, Southern Black girlhood, social media and AI, with a focus on Cowboy Carter	
Skidmore College	Beyoncé: An American Icon (AM 370)	4-credit course examining Beyoncé as a cultural producer and thinker who challenges dominant ideas about race, gender, sexuality, labor and family	
University College Dublin	Beyoncé and Tay: The Intersections of Race, Gender, and Celebrity (FS30310)	Module on race, gender, and celebrity culture, drawing on Lemonade, Cowboy Carter, Renaissance, and Dangerously in Love. It also uses the films Homecoming and Renaissance, and Destiny’s Child’s Survivor	
University of Hong Kong	Music and Global Politics: From Beethoven to Beyoncé and Beyond (CCGL9066)	Explores how music intersects with politics and power; Beyoncé is among various artists covered	
University of Herfordshire	US Culture and #BlackLivesMatter	Module (part of an MA in Literature and Culture) that examines contemporary texts linked to social justice movements against violence and racism, including Beyoncé's Formation	
Arizona State University	Lemonade: Beyoncé and Black Feminism	Exploration of Black feminism using Beyoncé as a central entry point	
California Polytechnic State University, San Luis Obispo	Beyoncé: Race, Feminism and Politics	Uses Beyoncé's body of work and image as a lens to examine constructions of race, gender and sexuality and their deployment as political tools	
University of Illinois Chicago	Beyoncé: Critical Feminist Perspectives and U.S. Black Womanhood	Uses Beyoncé’s music, career, lyrics, media coverage, and public persona to explore critical feminist perspectives, media representations of African American women, and issues of race, gender, class, and sexuality	
Rhode Island School of Design	Sophomore: Identity/Identities	3-credit Apparel Design course on identity and alter egos that references Beyoncé’s Sasha Fierce persona	
Berklee College of Music	Blazin' Country Trails: From the African Diaspora to Beyonce	The course examines the African and Native American foundations of country music, highlighting the influence of Black musicians, including Beyoncé	
Brandeis University	Beyoncé and Beyond: The Politics of Black Popular Music	A 4-credit course using Dangerously in Love, B’Day, Lemonade, Black Is King and more to explore Black music across the diaspora and its cultural, political and economic impact	
University of Cincinnati	Beyoncé: Culture and Musical Phenomenon	A full 3-credit course centered specifically on Beyoncé and her impact as both a musical and cultural figure	
University of South Carolina	Lemonade and Beyond: Black Women’s Agency and Community Building Through Musical Performance	Course partly inspired by Beyoncé’s Lemonade that explores the musical and artistic contributions of Black women across different eras and traditions	
University of Colorado Colorado Springs	Dance Appreciation: From Ballet to Beyoncé	A 3-credit course examining the role of dance in human identity	
School of the Art Institute of Chicago	The Architecture of Western Music	A 3-credit course exploring musical structures, performance practices, and the social functions of music through the work of artists including Beyoncé	
Fashion Institute of Technology	The Beyoncé Effect: The Impact of Black Culture on the Fashion Industry	A 3-credit course that examines Beyoncé’s influence on fashion from both the business and cultural side	
ArtCenter College of Design	Pretty Hurts	Exploration of contemporary feminism through the lens of Beyoncé's works	
University of Birmingham	Black Activisms in the US South: Power, Feminisms, and Black Lives Mattering from 1960–Present	20-credit Master’s module examining Black social movements from the 1960s to the present, including Beyoncé’s creative activism	
Edith Cowan University	Music History: Iconic Albums from Beatles to Beyonce	15-credit course examining seminal albums from the 1960s to the present through their historical, societal and cultural contexts	
University of Otago	Poetry and Music (ENGL 219 / ENGL 391)	Course examining the relationship between poetry and music, using Beyoncé’s work (alongside other artists) to analyse sound and meaning, performance, and the social roles of song	
University of Greifswald	This ain’t Texas (but it sure is Country!)	Explores the history, cultural significance and diversity of American country music (from Johnny Cash to Beyoncé), with students developing their own creative projects inspired by the genre	

== See also ==
- List of best-selling music artists
- List of awards and nominations received by Beyoncé
- List of awards and nominations received by Destiny's Child
