= List of awards and nominations received by Beyoncé =

Accolades of American singer-songwriter

Beyoncé awards and nominations
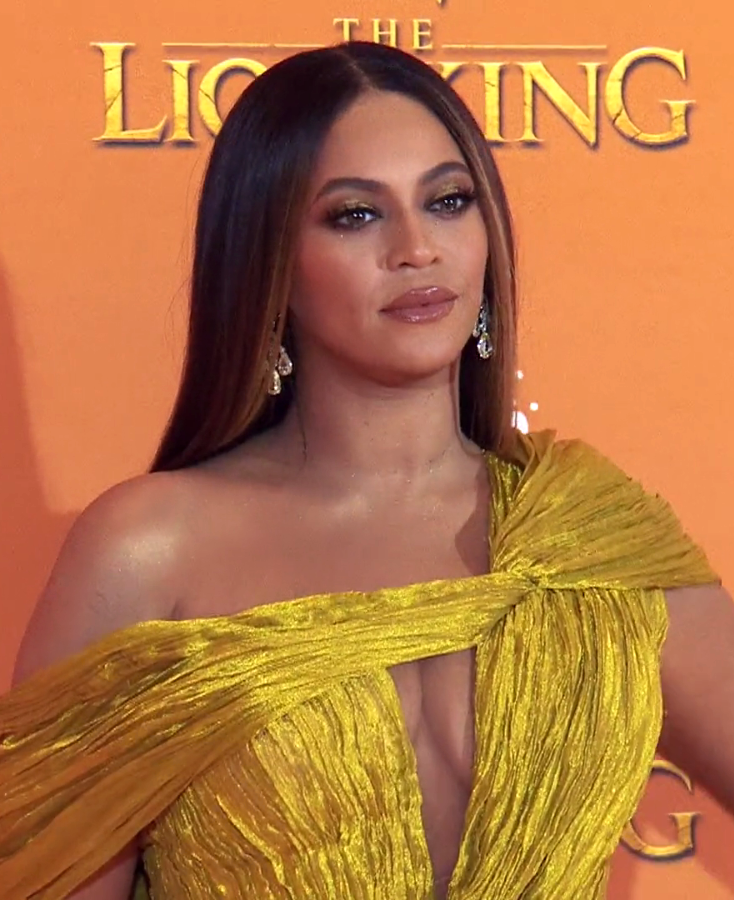
- Beyoncé in 2019
Awards and nominations
Award	Wins	Nominations
Academy Awards	0	1
American Music Awards	13	36
BET Awards	36	83
Billboard Music Awards	28	62
Brit Awards	5	12
Emmy Awards	1	11
Grammy Awards	35	100
MTV Video Music Awards	28	96
NAACP Image Awards	32	72
Soul Train Music Awards	20	58

Totals (Note: Certain award groups do not simply award one winner. They acknowledge several different recipients, have runners-up, and have third place. Since this is a specific recognition and is different from losing an award, runner-up mentions are considered wins in this award tally. For simplification and to avoid errors, each award in this list has been presumed to have had a prior nomination.)
- Wins: 756
- Nominations: 1,367

The American singer and songwriter Beyoncé has received numerous industry awards and honorary accolades. One of the most-awarded artists in popular music, she has the most accolades of any music act at the Grammy Awards (35), the BET Awards (36), the NAACP Image Awards (32), and the Soul Train Music Awards (25). Her initial success came with the girl group Destiny's Child, which won three Grammy Awards, including two for their number-one hit "Say My Name" (2000).

Beyoncé's debut studio album, Dangerously in Love (2003), won five Grammy Awards, including Best Contemporary R&B Album, tying the record (Note: With Lauryn Hill, Alicia Keys and Norah Jones) for the most awards won by a woman in one night. Its lead single, "Crazy in Love", won three MTV Video Music Awards, including Best Female Video and Best R&B Video. Her second studio album, B'Day (2006), became her second consecutive win for the Grammy Award for Best Contemporary R&B Album. In 2010, Beyoncé won six Grammy Awards, breaking the record she tied in 2004 for the most accolades won in a single night by a woman. Her wins included Song of the Year for "Single Ladies (Put a Ring on It)" and Best Contemporary R&B Album for her third studio album, I Am... Sasha Fierce (2008). "Single Ladies" also won the MTV Video Music Award for Video of the Year.

Beyoncé's fourth album, 4, won R&B Album of the Year at the Billboard Music Awards. "Love on Top" won the Grammy Award for Best Traditional R&B Performance. Her fifth studio album, Beyoncé (2013), won Grammy Award for Best Surround Sound Album, and its single "Drunk in Love" won Best R&B Song and Best R&B Performance. At the 2014 MTV Video Music Awards, she won three competitive awards and the Michael Jackson Video Vanguard Award. The music video for her song "Formation" earned her the Grammy Award for Best Music Video and her second MTV Video Music Award for Video of the Year. Its parent album, Lemonade (2016), won her the Grammy Award for Best Urban Contemporary Album and a Peabody Award; her collaborative album with rapper Jay-Z, Everything Is Love (2018), also won the former accolade.

At the 63rd Annual Grammy Awards, "Brown Skin Girl" won Beyoncé her second Grammy Award for Best Music Video; she also won Best Rap Song for "Savage Remix". Her seventh album, Renaissance (2022), won the Grammy Award for Best Dance/Electronic Album, with "Cuff It" winning Best R&B Song. Beyoncé's eighth studio album, Cowboy Carter (2024), received the Grammy Award for Album of the Year and Best Country Album. In December 2024, Billboard named her the greatest pop star of the 21st century. She won a Primetime Emmy Award for costume design for her 2024 NFL Halftime Show. Her songs "Savage Remix", "Single Ladies", "Formation", and "Crazy in Love" ranked amongst Rolling Stone's list of the "500 Greatest Songs of All Time". Her albums Beyoncé, Renaissance, and Lemonade were placed amongst the publication's list of the "500 Greatest Albums of All Time".

== Major associations ==
=== Academy Awards ===
Year	Category	Nominated work	Result	Ref.
2022	Best Original Song	"Be Alive" (from King Richard)	Nominated	

=== Emmy Awards ===
Year	Category	Nominated work	Result	Ref.
Primetime Emmy Awards
2013	Outstanding Short-Format Live-Action Entertainment Program	Super Bowl XLVII Halftime Show Starring Beyoncé	Nominated	
2015	Outstanding Special Class Program	On the Run Tour: Beyoncé and Jay-Z	Nominated	
2016	Outstanding Variety, Music, or Comedy Special	Lemonade	Nominated	
2016	Outstanding Directing for a Variety Special	Lemonade	Nominated	
2019	Outstanding Variety Special (Pre-Recorded)	Homecoming: A Film by Beyoncé	Nominated	
2019	Outstanding Directing for a Variety Special	Homecoming: A Film by Beyoncé	Nominated	
2019	Outstanding Music Direction	Homecoming: A Film by Beyoncé	Nominated	
2019	Outstanding Writing for a Variety Special	Homecoming: A Film by Beyoncé	Nominated	
2025	Outstanding Variety Special (Live)	Beyoncé Bowl	Nominated	
2025	Outstanding Directing for a Variety Special	Beyoncé Bowl	Nominated	
2025	Outstanding Costumes for a Variety, Nonfiction, or Reality Programming	Beyoncé Bowl	Won	
Daytime Emmy Awards
2022	Outstanding Original Song for a Series	"Talks with Mama Tina Theme Song" (from Talks with Mama Tina)	Nominated	
Sports Emmy Awards
2025	Outstanding Open/Tease	Beyoncé: Meet Team USA	Nominated	

=== Golden Globe Awards ===
Year	Category	Nominated work	Result	Ref.
2006	Best Actress in a Motion Picture – Musical or Comedy	Dreamgirls	Nominated	
2006	Best Original Song	"Listen" (from Dreamgirls)	Nominated	
2008	Best Original Song	"Once in a Lifetime" (from Cadillac Records)	Nominated	
2020	Best Original Song	"Spirit" (from The Lion King)	Nominated	
2022	Best Original Song	"Be Alive" (from King Richard)	Nominated	

=== Grammy Awards ===
Year	Category	Nominated work	Result	Ref.
2000	Best R&B Performance by a Duo or Group with Vocals	"Bills, Bills, Bills"	Nominated	
2000	Best R&B Song	"Bills, Bills, Bills"	Nominated	
2001	Record of the Year	"Say My Name"	Nominated	
2001	Song of the Year	"Say My Name"	Nominated	
2001	Best R&B Performance by a Duo or Group with Vocals	"Say My Name"	Won	
2001	Best R&B Song	"Say My Name"	Won	
2001	Best Song Written for a Motion Picture, Television or Other Visual Media	"Independent Women Part I"	Nominated	
2002	Best R&B Performance by a Duo or Group with Vocals	"Survivor"	Won	
2002	Best R&B Album	Survivor	Nominated	
2004	Record of the Year	"Crazy in Love" (featuring Jay-Z)	Nominated	
2004	Best R&B Song	"Crazy in Love" (featuring Jay-Z)	Won	
2004	Best Rap/Sung Collaboration	"Crazy in Love" (featuring Jay-Z)	Won	
2004	Best Contemporary R&B Album	Dangerously in Love	Won	
2004	Best R&B Performance by a Duo or Group with Vocals	"The Closer I Get to You" (with Luther Vandross)	Won	
2004	Best Female R&B Vocal Performance	"Dangerously in Love 2"	Won	
2005	Best R&B Performance by a Duo or Group with Vocals	"Lose My Breath"	Nominated	
2006	Best Female R&B Vocal Performance	"Wishing on a Star"	Nominated	
2006	Best R&B Song	"Cater 2 U"	Nominated	
2006	Best R&B Performance by a Duo or Group with Vocals	"Cater 2 U"	Nominated	
2006	Best R&B Performance by a Duo or Group with Vocals	"So Amazing" (with Stevie Wonder)	Won	
2006	Best Contemporary R&B Album	Destiny Fulfilled	Nominated	
2006	Best Rap/Sung Collaboration	"Soldier" (featuring T.I. and Lil Wayne)	Nominated	
2007	Best Female R&B Vocal Performance	"Ring the Alarm"	Nominated	
2007	Best R&B Song	"Déjà Vu" (featuring Jay-Z)	Nominated	
2007	Best Rap/Sung Collaboration	"Déjà Vu" (featuring Jay-Z)	Nominated	
2007	Best Contemporary R&B Album	B'Day	Won	
2008	Record of the Year	"Irreplaceable"	Nominated	
2008	Best Pop Collaboration with Vocals	"Beautiful Liar" (with Shakira)	Nominated	
2008	Best Compilation Soundtrack Album for Motion Picture, Television or Other Visual Media	Dreamgirls: Music from the Motion Picture	Nominated	
2009	Best Female R&B Vocal Performance	"Me, Myself and I" (live version)	Nominated	
2010	Record of the Year	"Halo"	Nominated	
2010	Best Female Pop Vocal Performance	"Halo"	Won	
2010	Album of the Year	I Am... Sasha Fierce	Nominated	
2010	Best Contemporary R&B Album	I Am... Sasha Fierce	Won	
2010	Song of the Year	"Single Ladies (Put a Ring on It)"	Won	
2010	Best Female R&B Vocal Performance	"Single Ladies (Put a Ring on It)"	Won	
2010	Best R&B Song	"Single Ladies (Put a Ring on It)"	Won	
2010	Best Traditional R&B Vocal Performance	"At Last"	Won	
2010	Best Rap/Sung Collaboration	"Ego (Remix)" (featuring Kanye West)	Nominated	
2010	Best Song Written for a Motion Picture, Television or Other Visual Media	"Once in a Lifetime" (from Cadillac Records)	Nominated	
2011	Album of the Year	The Fame Monster (as featured artist)	Nominated	
2011	Best Female Pop Vocal Performance	"Halo" (live version)	Nominated	
2011	Best Pop Collaboration with Vocals	"Telephone" (Lady Gaga featuring Beyoncé)	Nominated	
2012	Best Rap/Sung Collaboration	"Party" (featuring André 3000)	Nominated	
2012	Best Long Form Music Video	I Am... World Tour	Nominated	
2013	Best Traditional R&B Performance	"Love On Top"	Won	
2014	Best Rap/Sung Collaboration	"Part II (On the Run)" (Jay-Z featuring Beyoncé)	Nominated	
2015	Album of the Year	Beyoncé	Nominated	
2015	Best Surround Sound Album	Beyoncé	Won	
2015	Best Urban Contemporary Album	Beyoncé	Nominated	
2015	Best R&B Performance	"Drunk in Love" (featuring Jay-Z)	Won	
2015	Best R&B Song	"Drunk in Love" (featuring Jay-Z)	Won	
2015	Best Music Film	Beyoncé & Jay Z: On the Run Tour	Nominated	
2017	Record of the Year	"Formation"	Nominated	
2017	Song of the Year	"Formation"	Nominated	
2017	Best Music Video	"Formation"	Won	
2017	Album of the Year	Lemonade	Nominated	
2017	Best Urban Contemporary Album	Lemonade	Won	
2017	Best Music Film	Lemonade	Nominated	
2017	Best Pop Solo Performance	"Hold Up"	Nominated	
2017	Best Rock Performance	"Don't Hurt Yourself" (featuring Jack White)	Nominated	
2017	Best Rap/Sung Performance	"Freedom" (featuring Kendrick Lamar)	Nominated	
2018	Best R&B Performance	"Summer"	Nominated	
2018	Best Rap/Sung Performance	"Family Feud" (Jay-Z featuring Beyoncé)	Nominated	
2019	Best Urban Contemporary Album	Everything Is Love	Won	
2019	Best Music Video	"Apeshit" (with Jay-Z)	Nominated	
2020	Best Pop Solo Performance	"Spirit" (from The Lion King)	Nominated	
2020	Best Song Written for Visual Media	"Spirit" (from The Lion King)	Nominated	
2020	Best Pop Vocal Album	The Lion King: The Gift	Nominated	
2020	Best Music Film	Homecoming: A Film by Beyoncé	Won	
2021	Record of the Year	"Black Parade"	Nominated	
2021	Song of the Year	"Black Parade"	Nominated	
2021	Best R&B Performance	"Black Parade"	Won	
2021	Best R&B Song	"Black Parade"	Nominated	
2021	Record of the Year	"Savage (Remix)" (Megan Thee Stallion featuring Beyoncé)	Nominated	
2021	Best Rap Performance	"Savage (Remix)" (Megan Thee Stallion featuring Beyoncé)	Won	
2021	Best Rap Song	"Savage (Remix)" (Megan Thee Stallion featuring Beyoncé)	Won	
2021	Best Music Video	"Brown Skin Girl" (with Blue Ivy Carter, Saint Jhn and Wizkid)	Won	
2021	Best Music Film	Black Is King	Nominated	
2023	Record of the Year	"Break My Soul"	Nominated	
2023	Song of the Year	"Break My Soul"	Nominated	
2023	Best Dance/Electronic Recording	"Break My Soul"	Won	
2023	Album of the Year	Renaissance	Nominated	
2023	Best Dance/Electronic Album	Renaissance	Won	
2023	Best R&B Performance	"Virgo's Groove"	Nominated	
2023	Best Traditional R&B Performance	"Plastic Off the Sofa"	Won	
2023	Best R&B Song	"Cuff It"	Won	
2023	Best Song Written for Visual Media	"Be Alive" (from King Richard)	Nominated	
2025	Record of the Year	"Texas Hold 'Em"	Nominated	
2025	Song of the Year	"Texas Hold 'Em"	Nominated	
2025	Best Country Song	"Texas Hold 'Em"	Nominated	
2025	Album of the Year	Cowboy Carter	Won	
2025	Best Country Album	Cowboy Carter	Won	
2025	Best Pop Solo Performance	"Bodyguard"	Nominated	
2025	Best Pop Duo/Group Performance	"Levii's Jeans" (featuring Post Malone)	Nominated	
2025	Best Melodic Rap Performance	"Spaghettii" (with Linda Martell & Shaboozey)	Nominated	
2025	Best Country Solo Performance	"16 Carriages"	Nominated	
2025	Best Country Duo/Group Performance	"II Most Wanted" (with Miley Cyrus)	Won	
2025	Best Americana Performance	"Ya Ya"	Nominated	
2027	Best R&B Solo Performance	Morning Dew (Donk)	Pending	

=== Latin Grammy Awards ===
Year	Category	Nominated work	Result	Ref.
2007	Record of the Year	"Beautiful Liar" (with Shakira)	Nominated	
2018	Best Urban Fusion/Performance	"Mi Gente" (J Balvin and Willy William featuring Beyoncé)	Nominated	

=== Peabody Awards ===
Year	Category	Nominated work	Result	Ref.
2016	Entertainment	Lemonade	Won	

=== Screen Actors Guild Awards ===
Year	Category	Nominated work	Result	Ref.
2006	Outstanding Cast in a Motion Picture	Dreamgirls (Note: Shared with Hinton Battle, Jamie Foxx, Danny Glover, Jennifer Hudson, Sharon Leal, Eddie Murphy, Keith Robinson and Anika Noni Rose.)	Nominated	

== Miscellaneous awards ==
Name of the award ceremony, year presented, award category, nominee(s) of the award, and the result of the nomination
Award	Year (Note: Indicates the year of ceremony. Each year is linked to the article about the awards held that year, wherever possible.)	Category	Recipient(s)	Result	Ref.
4Music Video Honours	2009	World's Greatest Popstar	Beyoncé	Won	
4Music Video Honours	2011	Best Video	"Best Thing I Never Had"	Nominated	
4Music Video Honours	2011	Best Video	"Run the World (Girls)"	Nominated	
4Music Video Honours	2013	Style King/Queen	Beyoncé	Won	
Australian Cinematographers Society	2014	Best Music Clip	"Mine" (featuring Drake)	Gold	
Academia Del Perfume Awards	2011	Best Female General Public Perfume	Heat	Won	
Adweek Experiential Awards	2025	Best Sports-Related Experiential Activation	Beyoncé Bowl	Won	
Adweek Experiential Awards	2025	Best Use of Celebrity in an Experiential Activation	Beyoncé Bowl	Won	
Adweek Experiential Awards	2025	Best Use of Partnership in an Experiential Activation	Beyoncé Bowl	Nominated	
Adweek Experiential Awards	2025	Experiential Activation Over $1 Million	Beyoncé Bowl	Nominated	
African-American Film Critics Association	2016	Best TV Show – Special or Limited Series	Lemonade	Won	
AICE Awards	2014	Best Music Video	"Mine" (featuring Drake)	Nominated	
AICE Awards	2016	Best Music Video	"Formation"	Won	
AICE Awards	2017	Best Color Grading: Music Video	"Hold Up"	Nominated	
AICE Awards	2019	Best Color Grading: Music Video	"Apeshit" (with Jay-Z)	Won	
AICE Awards	2021	Best Color Grading: Music Video	"Brown Skin Girl" (with Blue Ivy Carter, Saint Jhn and Wizkid)	Won	
Allure Beauty Awards	2015	Nail Art	Beyoncé	Won	
Allure Beauty Awards	2024	Best Strengthening Hair Mask	Cécred Reconstructing Treatment Mask	Won	
Allure Beauty Awards	2025	Best Scalp Serum	Cécred Restoring Hair & Edge Drops	Won	
Allure Beauty Awards	2025	Parting Tail Comb: Best Comb	Cécred Restoring Hair & Edge Drops	Won	
American Music Awards	2003	Beyoncé	Favorite Soul/R&B Female Artist	Nominated	
American Music Awards	2003	Beyoncé	Fan's Choice Award	Nominated	
American Music Awards	2003	Favorite Soul/R&B Album	Dangerously in Love	Nominated	
American Music Awards	2004	Favorite Soul/R&B Female Artist	Beyoncé	Nominated	
American Music Awards	2006	Artist of the Year	Beyoncé	Nominated	
American Music Awards	2007	International Artist Award	Beyoncé	Won	
American Music Awards	2007	Favorite Pop/Rock Female Artist	Beyoncé	Nominated	
American Music Awards	2007	Favorite Soul/R&B Female Artist	Beyoncé	Nominated	
American Music Awards	2007	Favorite Soul/R&B Album	B'Day	Nominated	
American Music Awards	2007	Favorite Soundtrack	Dreamgirls: Music from the Motion Picture	Nominated	
American Music Awards	2009	Favorite Pop/Rock Female Artist	Beyoncé	Nominated	
American Music Awards	2009	Favorite Soul/R&B Female Artist	Beyoncé	Won	
American Music Awards	2009	Favorite Soul/R&B Album	I Am... Sasha Fierce	Nominated	
American Music Awards	2011	Favorite Soul/R&B Female Artist	Beyoncé	Won	
American Music Awards	2011	Favorite Soul/R&B Album	4	Nominated	
American Music Awards	2012	Favorite Soul/R&B Female Artist	Beyoncé	Won	
American Music Awards	2014	Artist of the Year	Beyoncé	Nominated	
American Music Awards	2014	Favorite Soul/R&B Female Artist	Beyoncé	Won	
American Music Awards	2014	Favorite Soul/R&B Album	Beyoncé	Won	
American Music Awards	2015	Favorite Soul/R&B Female Artist	Beyoncé	Nominated	
American Music Awards	2016	Favorite Soul/R&B Female Artist	Beyoncé	Nominated	
American Music Awards	2016	Tour of the Year	The Formation World Tour	Won	
American Music Awards	2016	Favorite Soul/R&B Album	Lemonade	Nominated	
American Music Awards	2017	Favorite Soul/R&B Female Artist	Beyoncé	Won	
American Music Awards	2018	Tour of the Year	On the Run II Tour (with Jay-Z)	Nominated	
American Music Awards	2019	Favorite Soul/R&B Female Artist	Beyoncé	Won	
American Music Awards	2020	Collaboration of the Year	"Savage (Remix)" (Megan Thee Stallion featuring Beyoncé)	Nominated	
American Music Awards	2022	Artist of the Year	Beyoncé	Nominated	
American Music Awards	2022	Favorite Female Pop Artist	Beyoncé	Nominated	
American Music Awards	2022	Favorite Female R&B Artist	Beyoncé	Won	
American Music Awards	2022	Favorite R&B Album	Renaissance	Won	
American Music Awards	2022	Favorite Pop Album	Renaissance	Nominated	
American Music Awards	2022	Favorite R&B Song	"Break My Soul"	Nominated	
American Music Awards	2025	Favorite Country Female Artist	Beyoncé	Won	
American Music Awards	2025	Album of the Year	Cowboy Carter	Nominated	
American Music Awards	2025	Favorite Country Album	Cowboy Carter	Won	
All Africa Music Awards	2019	Best Collaboration	"Brown Skin Girl" (with Blue Ivy Carter, Saint Jhn and Wizkid)	Nominated	
All Africa Music Awards	2020	Best Collaboration	"Already" (with Shatta Wale and Major Lazer)	Nominated	
All Africa Music Awards	2021	Best Global Act	Beyoncé	Won	
Apple Music Awards	2014	Best Artist of the Year	Beyoncé	Won	
ARF David Ogilvy Awards	2024	Best Brand Transformation	Verizon "Can't B Broken" Commercial	Gold	
ARF David Ogilvy Awards	2024	Electronics & Technology	Verizon "Can't B Broken" Commercial	Gold	
ARIA Music Awards	2014	Best International Artist	Beyoncé	Nominated	
ARIA Music Awards	2016	Best International Artist	Beyoncé	Nominated	
The Arthur Awards	2021	Tour of the Decade	Beyoncé	Nominated	
The Arthur Awards	2026	The Top Tour Award	Cowboy Carter Tour	Nominated	
ASCAP Country Music Awards	2024	Songwriters and Publishers of the Most Performed	"Texas Hold 'Em"	Won	
ASCAP Film and Television Music Awards	2002	Most Performed Songs from Motion Pictures	"Independent Women Part I"	Won	
ASCAP Latin Awards	2018	Most Performed Urban Songs	"Mi Gente" (J Balvin and Willy William featuring Beyoncé)	Won	
ASCAP Pop Music Awards	2001	Most Performed Songs	"Say My Name"	Won	
ASCAP Pop Music Awards	2002	Songwriter of the Year	Beyoncé	Won	
ASCAP Pop Music Awards	2002	Most Performed Songs	"Independent Women Part I"	Won	
ASCAP Pop Music Awards	2002	Most Performed Songs	"Survivor"	Won	
ASCAP Pop Music Awards	2002	Most Performed Songs	"Jumpin', Jumpin'"	Won	
ASCAP Pop Music Awards	2004	Most Performed Songs	"Crazy in Love" (featuring Jay-Z)	Won	
ASCAP Pop Music Awards	2005	Most Performed Songs	"Baby Boy" (featuring Sean Paul)	Won	
ASCAP Pop Music Awards	2005	Most Performed Songs	"Me, Myself and I"	Won	
ASCAP Pop Music Awards	2005	Most Performed Songs	"Naughty Girl"	Won	
ASCAP Pop Music Awards	2006	Most Performed Songs	"Lose My Breath"	Won	
ASCAP Pop Music Awards	2006	Most Performed Songs	"Soldier" (featuring T.I. and Lil Wayne)	Won	
ASCAP Pop Music Awards	2007	Most Performed Songs	"Check on It" (featuring Bun B and Slim Thug)	Won	
ASCAP Pop Music Awards	2007	Most Performed Songs	"Grillz" (Nelly featuring Paul Wall and Ali & Gipp) (Note: Awards and nominations Knowles has received as a writer.)	Won	
ASCAP Pop Music Awards	2008	Most Performed Songs	"Irreplaceable"	Won	
ASCAP Pop Music Awards	2010	Most Performed Songs	"Halo"	Won	
ASCAP Pop Music Awards	2010	Most Performed Songs	"Single Ladies (Put a Ring on It)"	Won	
ASCAP Pop Music Awards	2010	Most Performed Songs	"Sweet Dreams"	Won	
ASCAP Pop Music Awards	2011	Most Performed Songs	"Telephone" (Lady Gaga featuring Beyoncé)	Won	
ASCAP Pop Music Awards	2015	Most Performed Songs	"Drunk in Love" (featuring Jay-Z)	Won	
ASCAP Pop Music Awards	2021	Most Performed Songs	"Savage (Remix)" (Megan Thee Stallion featuring Beyoncé)	Won	
ASCAP Pop Music Awards	2021	Most Performed Songs	"Playing Games" (Summer Walker featuring Bryson Tiller)	Won	
ASCAP Pop Music Awards	2023	Most Performed Songs	"Break My Soul"	Won	
ASCAP Pop Music Awards	2024	Most Performed Songs	"Cuff It"	Won	
ASCAP Pop Music Awards	2025	Most Performed Songs	"Texas Hold 'Em"	Won	
ASCAP PRS Awards	2007	Most Performed Songs	"Irreplaceable"	Won	
ASCAP Rhythm & Soul Music Awards	1999	Award-winning R&B/Hip-Hop Songs	"No, No, No"	Won	
ASCAP Rhythm & Soul Music Awards	2000	Award-winning R&B/Hip-Hop Songs	"Bills, Bills, Bills"	Won	
ASCAP Rhythm & Soul Music Awards	2001	Award-winning R&B/Hip-Hop Songs	"Say My Name"	Won	
ASCAP Rhythm & Soul Music Awards	2002	Top Soundtrack Song of the Year	"Independent Women Part I"	Won	
ASCAP Rhythm & Soul Music Awards	2004	Award-winning R&B/Hip-Hop Songs	"Crazy in Love" (featuring Jay-Z)	Won	
ASCAP Rhythm & Soul Music Awards	2004	Award-winning R&B/Hip-Hop Songs	"Baby Boy" (featuring Sean Paul)	Won	
ASCAP Rhythm & Soul Music Awards	2005	Award-winning R&B/Hip-Hop Songs	"Me, Myself and I"	Won	
ASCAP Rhythm & Soul Music Awards	2006	Award-winning R&B/Hip-Hop Songs	"Cater 2 U"	Won	
ASCAP Rhythm & Soul Music Awards	2006	Award-winning R&B/Hip-Hop Songs	"Soldier" (featuring T.I. and Lil Wayne)	Won	
ASCAP Rhythm & Soul Music Awards	2007	Award-winning R&B/Hip-Hop Songs	"Check on It" (featuring Bun B and Slim Thug)	Won	
ASCAP Rhythm & Soul Music Awards	2007	Soundtrack Song of the Year	"Check on It" (featuring Bun B and Slim Thug)	Won	
ASCAP Rhythm & Soul Music Awards	2007	Award-winning R&B/Hip-Hop Songs	"Grillz" (Nelly featuring Paul Wall and Ali & Gipp)	Won	
ASCAP Rhythm & Soul Music Awards	2007	Award-Winning Rap Song	"Grillz" (Nelly featuring Paul Wall and Ali & Gipp)	Won	
ASCAP Rhythm & Soul Music Awards	2007	Ringtone of the Year	"Grillz" (Nelly featuring Paul Wall and Ali & Gipp)	Won	
ASCAP Rhythm & Soul Music Awards	2008	Award-winning R&B/Hip-Hop Songs	"Get Me Bodied"	Won	
ASCAP Rhythm & Soul Music Awards	2008	Award-winning R&B/Hip-Hop Songs	"Irreplaceable"	Won	
ASCAP Rhythm & Soul Music Awards	2008	Award-winning R&B/Hip-Hop Songs	"Until the End of Time" (Justin Timberlake featuring Beyoncé)	Won	
ASCAP Rhythm & Soul Music Awards	2010	Award-winning R&B/Hip-Hop Songs	"Diva"	Won	
ASCAP Rhythm & Soul Music Awards	2010	Award-winning R&B/Hip-Hop Songs	"Ego"	Won	
ASCAP Rhythm & Soul Music Awards	2010	Award-winning R&B/Hip-Hop Songs	"Single Ladies (Put a Ring on It)"	Won	
ASCAP Rhythm & Soul Music Awards	2012	Award-winning R&B/Hip-Hop Songs	"Best Thing I Never Had"	Won	
ASCAP Rhythm & Soul Music Awards	2013	Top R&B/Hip-Hop Song	"Love On Top"	Won	
ASCAP Rhythm & Soul Music Awards	2013	Award-winning R&B/Hip-Hop Songs	"Dance for You"	Won	
ASCAP Rhythm & Soul Music Awards	2013	Award-winning R&B/Hip-Hop Songs	"Party" (featuring André 3000)	Won	
ASCAP Rhythm & Soul Music Awards	2015	Top R&B/Hip-Hop Song	"Drunk in Love" (featuring Jay-Z)	Won	
ASCAP Rhythm & Soul Music Awards	2015	Award-winning R&B/Hip-Hop Songs	"Flawless" (featuring Chimamanda Ngozi Adichie)	Won	
ASCAP Rhythm & Soul Music Awards	2015	Award-winning R&B/Hip-Hop Songs	"Partition"	Won	
ASCAP Rhythm & Soul Music Awards	2016	Award-winning R&B/Hip-Hop Songs	"7/11"	Won	
ASCAP Rhythm & Soul Music Awards	2016	Award-winning R&B/Hip-Hop Songs	"Feeling Myself" (Nicki Minaj featuring Beyoncé)	Won	
ASCAP Rhythm & Soul Music Awards	2017	Award-winning R&B/Hip-Hop Songs	"Hold Up"	Won	
ASCAP Rhythm & Soul Music Awards	2017	Award-winning R&B/Hip-Hop Songs	"Formation"	Won	
ASCAP Rhythm & Soul Music Awards	2017	Award-winning R&B/Hip-Hop Songs	"Sorry"	Won	
ASCAP Rhythm & Soul Music Awards	2018	Award-winning R&B/Hip-Hop Songs	"Shining" (DJ Khaled featuring Beyoncé and Jay-Z)	Won	
ASCAP Rhythm & Soul Music Awards	2019	Award-winning R&B/Hip-Hop Songs	"Apeshit" (with Jay-Z)	Won	
ASCAP Rhythm & Soul Music Awards	2020	Award-winning R&B/Hip-Hop Songs	"24/7" (Meek Mill featuring Ella Mai)	Won	
ASCAP Rhythm & Soul Music Awards	2021	Award-winning R&B/Hip-Hop Songs	"Savage (Remix)" (Megan Thee Stallion featuring Beyoncé)	Won	
ASCAP Rhythm & Soul Music Awards	2021	Award-winning R&B/Hip-Hop Songs	"Playing Games" (Summer Walker featuring Bryson Tiller)	Won	
ASCAP Rhythm & Soul Music Awards	2023	Award-winning R&B/Hip-Hop Songs	"Break My Soul"	Won	
ASCAP Rhythm & Soul Music Awards	2023	Award-winning R&B/Hip-Hop Songs	"Cuff It"	Won	
ASCAP Rhythm & Soul Music Awards	2025	Award-winning R&B/Hip-Hop Songs	"Texas Hold 'Em"	Won	
Astra Film Awards	2022	Best Original Song	"Be Alive"	Won	
Astra TV Awards	2025	Best Variety Series or Special	Beyoncé Bowl	Nominated	
Audie Awards	2026	Audie Award for Autobiography or Memoir	Matriarch: A Memoir	Won	
BBC Music Awards	2016	Song of the Year	"Hymn for the Weekend" (Coldplay featuring Beyoncé)	Nominated	
BBC Music Awards	2016	Song of the Year	"Runnin' (Lose It All)" (Naughty Boy featuring Beyoncé and Arrow Benjamin)	Nominated	
BBC Radio 1's Teen Awards	2018	Best Single	"Perfect Duet" (with Ed Sheeran)	Nominated	
BDSCertified Spin Awards	2002	50,000 Spins	"'03 Bonnie & Clyde" (Jay-Z featuring Beyoncé)	Won	
BDSCertified Spin Awards	2003	100,000 Spins	"'03 Bonnie & Clyde" (Jay-Z featuring Beyoncé)	Won	
BDSCertified Spin Awards	2003	200,000 Spins	"'03 Bonnie & Clyde" (Jay-Z featuring Beyoncé)	Won	
BDSCertified Spin Awards	2003	100,000 Spins	"Baby Boy" (featuring Sean Paul)	Won	
BDSCertified Spin Awards	2003	200,000 Spins	"Baby Boy" (featuring Sean Paul)	Won	
BDSCertified Spin Awards	2003	50,000 Spins	"Crazy in Love" (featuring Jay-Z)	Won	
BDSCertified Spin Awards	2003	100,000 Spins	"Crazy in Love" (featuring Jay-Z)	Won	
BDSCertified Spin Awards	2003	200,000 Spins	"Crazy in Love" (featuring Jay-Z)	Won	
BDSCertified Spin Awards	2003	300,000 Spins	"Crazy in Love" (featuring Jay-Z)	Won	
BDSCertified Spin Awards	2004	50,000 Spins	"Naughty Girl"	Won	
BDSCertified Spin Awards	2004	100,000 Spins	"Naughty Girl"	Won	
BDSCertified Spin Awards	2004	50,000 Spins	"Me, Myself and I"	Won	
BDSCertified Spin Awards	2004	100,000 Spins	"Me, Myself and I"	Won	
BDSCertified Spin Awards	2004	300,000 Spins	"Baby Boy" (featuring Sean Paul)	Won	
BDSCertified Spin Awards	2005	50,000 Spins	"Check on It" (featuring Bun B and Slim Thug)	Won	
BDSCertified Spin Awards	2005	200,000 Spins	"Me, Myself and I"	Won	
BDSCertified Spin Awards	2005	300,000 Spins	"Naughty Girl"	Won	
BDSCertified Spin Awards	2005	400,000 Spins	"Baby Boy" (featuring Sean Paul)	Won	
BDSCertified Spin Awards	2005	400,000 Spins	"Crazy in Love" (featuring Jay-Z)	Won	
BDSCertified Spin Awards	2006	50,000 Spins	"Ring the Alarm"	Won	
BDSCertified Spin Awards	2006	50,000 Spins	"Irreplaceable"	Won	
BDSCertified Spin Awards	2006	100,000 Spins	"Irreplaceable"	Won	
BDSCertified Spin Awards	2006	50,000 Spins	"Déjà Vu" (featuring Jay-Z)	Won	
BDSCertified Spin Awards	2006	100,000 Spins	"Déjà Vu" (featuring Jay-Z)	Won	
BDSCertified Spin Awards	2006	200,000 Spins	"Check on It" (featuring Bun B and Slim Thug)	Won	
BDSCertified Spin Awards	2006	300,000 Spins	"Check on It" (featuring Bun B and Slim Thug)	Won	
BDSCertified Spin Awards	2007	50,000 Spins	"Beautiful Liar" (with Shakira)	Won	
BDSCertified Spin Awards	2007	100,000 Spins	"Until the End of Time" (Justin Timberlake featuring Beyoncé)	Won	
BDSCertified Spin Awards	2007	200,000 Spins	"Irreplaceable"	Won	
BDSCertified Spin Awards	2007	300,000 Spins	"Irreplaceable"	Won	
BDSCertified Spin Awards	2007	400,000 Spins	"Irreplaceable"	Won	
BDSCertified Spin Awards	2007	500,000 Spins	"Irreplaceable"	Won	
BDSCertified Spin Awards	2007	400,000 Spins	"Check on It" (featuring Bun B and Slim Thug)	Won	
BDSCertified Spin Awards	2007	500,000 Spins	"Crazy in Love" (featuring Jay-Z)	Won	
BDSCertified Spin Awards	2009	50,000 Spins	"Sweet Dreams"	Won	
BDSCertified Spin Awards	2009	100,000 Spins	"Sweet Dreams"	Won	
BDSCertified Spin Awards	2009	300,000 Spins	"Halo"	Won	
BDSCertified Spin Awards	2009	400,000 Spins	"Single Ladies (Put a Ring on It)"	Won	
BDSCertified Spin Awards	2010	200,000 Spins	"If I Were a Boy"	Won	
BDSCertified Spin Awards	2010	500,000 Spins	"Single Ladies (Put a Ring on It)"	Won	
BDSCertified Spin Awards	2011	400,000 Spins	"Telephone" (Lady Gaga featuring Beyoncé)	Won	
BDSCertified Spin Awards	2011	700,000 Spins	"Irreplaceable"	Won	
Beauty Inc Award	2025	Brand of the Year, Prestige	Cécred	Won	
BET Awards	2003	Best Collaboration	"'03 Bonnie & Clyde" (Jay-Z featuring Beyoncé)	Nominated	
BET Awards	2004	Video of the Year	"Crazy in Love" (featuring Jay-Z)	Nominated	
BET Awards	2004	Best Actress	The Fighting Temptations	Nominated	
BET Awards	2004	Best Female R&B Artist	Beyoncé	Won	
BET Awards	2004	Best Collaboration	"Crazy in Love" (featuring Jay-Z)	Won	
BET Awards	2004	Viewer's Choice Award	"Crazy in Love" (featuring Jay-Z)	Nominated	
BET Awards	2005	Best Female R&B Artist	Beyoncé	Nominated	
BET Awards	2005	Best Collaboration	"Soldier" (featuring T.I. and Lil Wayne)	Nominated	
BET Awards	2005	Viewer's Choice Award	"Soldier" (featuring T.I. and Lil Wayne)	Nominated	
BET Awards	2006	Video of the Year	"Check on It" (featuring Bun B and Slim Thug)	Nominated	
BET Awards	2006	Best Collaboration	"Check on It" (featuring Bun B and Slim Thug)	Nominated	
BET Awards	2007	Best Female R&B Artist	Beyoncé	Won	
BET Awards	2007	Video of the Year	"Beautiful Liar" (with Shakira)	Nominated	
BET Awards	2007	Video of the Year	"Irreplaceable"	Won	
BET Awards	2007	Viewer's Choice Award	"Irreplaceable"	Nominated	
BET Awards	2007	Best Collaboration	"Déjà Vu" (featuring Jay-Z)	Nominated	
BET Awards	2007	Best Collaboration	"Upgrade U" (featuring Jay-Z)	Nominated	
BET Awards	2009	Video of the Year	"If I Were a Boy"	Nominated	
BET Awards	2009	Video of the Year	"Single Ladies (Put a Ring on It)"	Won	
BET Awards	2009	Best Actress	Cadillac Records and Obsessed	Nominated	
BET Awards	2009	Best Female R&B Artist	Beyoncé	Won	
BET Awards	2009	Viewer's Choice Award	"Single Ladies (Put a Ring on It)"	Nominated	
BET Awards	2010	Best Female R&B Artist	Beyoncé	Nominated	
BET Awards	2010	Video of the Year	"Video Phone" (featuring Lady Gaga)	Won	
BET Awards	2010	Best Collaboration	"Video Phone" (featuring Lady Gaga)	Nominated	
BET Awards	2010	Viewer's Choice Award	"Sweet Dreams"	Nominated	
BET Awards	2011	Best Female R&B Artist	Beyoncé	Nominated	
BET Awards	2012	Video Director of the Year (Note: Shared with Alan Ferguson.)	Beyoncé	Won	
BET Awards	2012	Best Female R&B Artist	Beyoncé	Won	
BET Awards	2012	Video of the Year	"Countdown"	Nominated	
BET Awards	2012	Video of the Year	"Love On Top"	Nominated	
BET Awards	2012	Viewer's Choice Award	"Love On Top"	Nominated	
BET Awards	2012	Best Collaboration	"Party (Remix)" (featuring J. Cole)	Nominated	
BET Awards	2013	Best Female R&B Artist	Beyoncé	Nominated	
BET Awards	2014	Best Female R&B Artist	Beyoncé	Won	
BET Awards	2014	FANdemonium Award	Beyoncé	Won	
BET Awards	2014	Video of the Year	"Partition"	Nominated	
BET Awards	2014	Video of the Year	"Drunk in Love" (featuring Jay-Z)	Nominated	
BET Awards	2014	Best Collaboration	"Drunk in Love" (featuring Jay-Z)	Won	
BET Awards	2014	Viewer's Choice Award	"Drunk in Love" (featuring Jay-Z)	Nominated	
BET Awards	2015	Video Director of the Year (Note: Shared with Ed Burke and Todd Tourso.)	Beyoncé	Won	
BET Awards	2015	Best Female R&B Artist	Beyoncé	Won	
BET Awards	2015	Video of the Year	"7/11"	Won	
BET Awards	2015	Viewer's Choice Award	"7/11"	Nominated	
BET Awards	2016	Best Female R&B Artist	Beyoncé	Won	
BET Awards	2016	FANdemonium Award	Beyoncé	Won	
BET Awards	2016	Video of the Year	"Formation"	Won	
BET Awards	2016	Viewer's Choice Award	"Formation"	Won	
BET Awards	2016	Centric Award	"Formation"	Won	
BET Awards	2016	Best Collaboration	"Feeling Myself" (Nicki Minaj featuring Beyoncé)	Nominated	
BET Awards	2017	Best Female R&B Artist	Beyoncé	Won	
BET Awards	2017	Album of the Year	Lemonade	Won	
BET Awards	2017	Video of the Year	"Sorry"	Won	
BET Awards	2017	Video Director of the Year (Note: Shared with Kahlil Joseph.)	"Sorry"	Won	
BET Awards	2017	Viewer's Choice Award	"Sorry"	Won	
BET Awards	2017	Best Collaboration	"Freedom" (featuring Kendrick Lamar)	Nominated	
BET Awards	2017	Best Collaboration	"Shining" (DJ Khaled featuring Beyoncé and Jay-Z)	Nominated	
BET Awards	2018	Best Female R&B Artist	Beyoncé	Won	
BET Awards	2018	Best Collaboration	"Top Off" (DJ Khaled featuring Jay-Z, Future and Beyoncé)	Nominated	
BET Awards	2019	Best Female R&B Artist	Beyoncé	Won	
BET Awards	2019	Album of the Year	Everything is Love	Nominated	
BET Awards	2019	Video of the Year	"Apeshit" (with Jay-Z)	Nominated	
BET Awards	2019	Best Group	The Carters	Nominated	
BET Awards	2020	Humanitarian Award	Beyoncé	Won	
BET Awards	2020	Best Female R&B/Pop Artist	Beyoncé	Nominated	
BET Awards	2020	Album of the Year	Homecoming: The Live Album	Nominated	
BET Awards	2020	Best Movie	Homecoming: A Film by Beyoncé	Nominated	
BET Awards	2020	HER Award	"Brown Skin Girl" (with Blue Ivy Carter, Saint Jhn and Wizkid)	Won	
BET Awards	2021	Viewer's Choice Award	"Savage (Remix)" (Megan Thee Stallion featuring Beyoncé)	Won	
BET Awards	2021	Best Female R&B/Pop Artist	Beyoncé	Nominated	
BET Awards	2022	Video Director of the Year	Beyoncé & Dikayl Rimmasch	Nominated	
BET Awards	2023	Viewer's Choice Award	"Break My Soul"	Won	
BET Awards	2023	Best Female R&B/Pop Artist	Beyoncé	Nominated	
BET Awards	2023	HER Award	"Break My Soul"	Won	
BET Awards	2023	Album of the Year	Renaissance	Won	
BET Awards	2024	HER Award	"16 Carriages"	Nominated	
BET Awards	2024	Viewer's Choice Award	"Texas Hold 'Em"	Won	
BET Awards	2024	Best Collaboration	"America Has a Problem" (featuring Kendrick Lamar)	Nominated	
BET Awards	2024	Best Female R&B/Pop Artist	Beyoncé	Nominated	
BET Awards	2025	Album of the Year	Cowboy Carter	Nominated	
BET Awards	2025	HER Award	"Blackbiird" (featuring Brittney Spencer, Reyna Roberts, Tanner Adell & Tiera Kennedy)	Nominated	
BET Hip Hop Awards	2015	Best Hip Hop Video	"Feeling Myself" (Nicki Minaj featuring Beyoncé)	Nominated	
BET Hip Hop Awards	2015	Best Collaboration, Duo or Group	"Feeling Myself" (Nicki Minaj featuring Beyoncé)	Nominated	
BET Hip Hop Awards	2018	Single of the Year	"Apeshit" (with Jay-Z)	Won	
BET Hip Hop Awards	2018	Best Collaboration, Duo or Group	"Apeshit" (with Jay-Z)	Won	
BET Hip Hop Awards	2018	Album of the Year	Everything is Love	Won	
BET Hip Hop Awards	2019	Hot Ticket Performer	The Carters	Nominated	
BET Hip Hop Awards	2020	Song of the Year	"Savage (Remix)" (Megan Thee Stallion featuring Beyoncé)	Nominated	
BET Hip Hop Awards	2020	Best Collaboration	"Savage (Remix)" (Megan Thee Stallion featuring Beyoncé)	Won	
BET Hip Hop Awards	2020	Sweet 16: Best Featured Verse	"Savage (Remix)" (Megan Thee Stallion featuring Beyoncé)	Won	
Billboard Latin Music Awards	2018	Crossover Artist of the Year	Beyoncé	Nominated	
Billboard Latin Music Awards	2018	Hot Latin Song of the Year	"Mi Gente" (J Balvin and Willy William featuring Beyoncé)	Nominated	
Billboard Latin Music Awards	2018	Hot Latin Song of the Year, Vocal Event	"Mi Gente" (J Balvin and Willy William featuring Beyoncé)	Nominated	
Billboard Latin Music Awards	2018	Airplay Song of the Year	"Mi Gente" (J Balvin and Willy William featuring Beyoncé)	Nominated	
Billboard Latin Music Awards	2018	Digital Song of the Year	"Mi Gente" (J Balvin and Willy William featuring Beyoncé)	Nominated	
Billboard Latin Music Awards	2018	Streaming Song of the Year	"Mi Gente" (J Balvin and Willy William featuring Beyoncé)	Nominated	
Billboard Latin Music Awards	2018	Latin Rhythm Song of the Year	"Mi Gente" (J Balvin and Willy William featuring Beyoncé)	Won	
Billboard Mid-Year Music Awards	2011	Best Festival Performance	2011 Glastonbury performance	Nominated	
Billboard Mid-Year Music Awards	2011	Best Awards Show Performance	2011 Billboard Music Awards performance	Won	
Billboard Mid-Year Music Awards	2012	Best Festival Performance	2011 Glastonbury performance	Nominated	
Billboard Mid-Year Music Awards	2012	Best Style	Beyoncé	Won	
Billboard Mid-Year Music Awards	2013	First-Half MVP	2011 Glastonbury performance	Nominated	
Billboard Mid-Year Music Awards	2013	Most Shocking Moment	Second inauguration of Barack Obama performance	Won	
Billboard Mid-Year Music Awards	2013	Best TV Performance	Super Bowl XLVII halftime show	Won	
Billboard Mid-Year Music Awards	2013	Most Overrated Artist	Beyoncé	Nominated	
Billboard Mid-Year Music Awards	2013	Most Anticipated Event of 2013's Second half	The Mrs. Carter Show World Tour and Beyoncé	Nominated	
Billboard Mid-Year Music Awards	2014	Best Style	Beyoncé	Nominated	
Billboard Mid-Year Music Awards	2014	First-Half MVP	Beyoncé	Won	
Billboard Mid-Year Music Awards	2014	Best Tour	The Mrs. Carter Show World Tour	Nominated	
Billboard Mid-Year Music Awards	2014	Most Anticipated Event of 2014's Second Half	On the Run Tour (with Jay-Z)	Won	
Billboard Mid-Year Music Awards	2014	Favorite No. 1 Billboard 200 Album	Beyoncé	Won	
Billboard Mid-Year Music Awards	2014	Best Music Video	"Part II (On the Run)" (Jay-Z featuring Beyoncé)	Nominated	
Billboard Music Awards	2003	Top New Artist	Beyoncé	Won	
Billboard Music Awards	2003	Top Hot 100 Female Artist	Beyoncé	Won	
Billboard Music Awards	2003	Top New R&B/Hip-Hop Artist	Beyoncé	Won	
Billboard Music Awards	2003	Top Female R&B/Hip-Hop Artist of the Year	Beyoncé	Nominated	
Billboard Music Awards	2003	Top Female Artist of the Year	Beyoncé	Nominated	
Billboard Music Awards	2003	Hot 100 Award for Most Weeks at No. 1	"Crazy in Love" (featuring Jay-Z)	Won	
Billboard Music Awards	2003	Hot 100 Award for Most Weeks at No. 1	"Baby Boy" (featuring Sean Paul)	Won	
Billboard Music Awards	2004	Top Female Artist of the Year	Beyoncé	Nominated	
Billboard Music Awards	2004	Top Female R&B/Hip-Hop Artist of the Year	Beyoncé	Nominated	
Billboard Music Awards	2006	Female Artist of the Year	Beyoncé	Nominated	
Billboard Music Awards	2006	Female R&B/Hip-Hop Artist of the Year	Beyoncé	Nominated	
Billboard Music Awards	2006	Artist of the Year	Beyoncé	Nominated	
Billboard Music Awards	2006	Hot 100 Airplay Single	"Check on It" (featuring Bun B and Slim Thug)	Nominated	
Billboard Music Awards	2011	Millennium Award	Beyoncé	Won	
Billboard Music Awards	2011	Top Dance Song	"Telephone" (Lady Gaga featuring Beyoncé)	Nominated	
Billboard Music Awards	2012	Top R&B Album	4	Won	
Billboard Music Awards	2012	Top R&B Artist	Beyoncé	Nominated	
Billboard Music Awards	2012	FAN Award – Most Favorite Artist	Beyoncé	Nominated	
Billboard Music Awards	2012	FAN Award – Most Influential Style	Beyoncé	Nominated	
Billboard Music Awards	2014	Top Female Artist	Beyoncé	Nominated	
Billboard Music Awards	2014	Top Billboard 200 Artist	Beyoncé	Nominated	
Billboard Music Awards	2014	Top Touring Artist	Beyoncé	Nominated	
Billboard Music Awards	2014	Top R&B Artist	Beyoncé	Nominated	
Billboard Music Awards	2014	Top Billboard 200 Album	Beyoncé	Nominated	
Billboard Music Awards	2014	Top R&B Album	Beyoncé	Nominated	
Billboard Music Awards	2014	Top R&B Song	"Drunk in Love" (featuring Jay-Z)	Nominated	
Billboard Music Awards	2015	Top R&B Artist	Beyoncé	Nominated	
Billboard Music Awards	2015	Top R&B Album	Beyoncé	Nominated	
Billboard Music Awards	2017	Top Billboard 200 Artist	Beyoncé	Nominated	
Billboard Music Awards	2017	Top Artist	Beyoncé	Nominated	
Billboard Music Awards	2017	Top Female Artist	Beyoncé	Won	
Billboard Music Awards	2017	Top Touring Artist	Beyoncé	Won	
Billboard Music Awards	2017	Top R&B Artist	Beyoncé	Won	
Billboard Music Awards	2017	Top Billboard 200 Album	Lemonade	Nominated	
Billboard Music Awards	2017	Top R&B Album	Lemonade	Won	
Billboard Music Awards	2017	Top R&B Tour	The Formation World Tour	Won	
Billboard Music Awards	2018	Top R&B Artist	Beyoncé	Nominated	
Billboard Music Awards	2018	Top Latin Song	"Mi Gente" (J Balvin and Willy William featuring Beyoncé)	Nominated	
Billboard Music Awards	2019	Top Rap Tour	The Carters	Won	
Billboard Music Awards	2019	Top R&B Tour	The Carters	Won	
Billboard Music Awards	2020	Top R&B Artist	Beyoncé	Nominated	
Billboard Music Awards	2020	Top R&B Album	Homecoming: The Live Album	Nominated	
Billboard Music Awards	2021	Top Selling Song	"Savage (Remix)" (Megan Thee Stallion featuring Beyoncé)	Nominated	
Billboard Music Awards	2021	Top Rap Song	"Savage (Remix)" (Megan Thee Stallion featuring Beyoncé)	Nominated	
Billboard Music Awards	2023	Top Female Artist	Beyoncé	Nominated	
Billboard Music Awards	2023	Top R&B Artist	Beyoncé	Nominated	
Billboard Music Awards	2023	Top R&B Female Artist	Beyoncé	Nominated	
Billboard Music Awards	2023	Top R&B Touring Artist	Beyoncé	Won	
Billboard Music Awards	2023	Top Dance/Electronic Artist	Beyoncé	Won	
Billboard Music Awards	2023	Top R&B Album	Renaissance	Nominated	
Billboard Music Awards	2023	Top Dance/Electronic Album	Renaissance	Won	
Billboard Music Awards	2024	Top Country Female Artist	Beyoncé	Won	
Billboard Music Awards	2024	Top Dance/Electronic Artist	Beyoncé	Nominated	
Billboard Music Awards	2024	Top Country Album	Cowboy Carter	Nominated	
Billboard R&B/Hip-Hop Awards	2004	Top R&B/Hip-Hop New Artist	Beyoncé	Won	
Billboard R&B/Hip-Hop Awards	2004	Top Female R&B/Hip-Hop Artist	Beyoncé	Won	
Billboard R&B/Hip-Hop Awards	2004	Top R&B/Hip-Hop Album	Dangerously in Love	Nominated	
Billboard Touring Awards	2013	Concert Marketing & Promotion Award	The Mrs. Carter Show World Tour	Nominated	
Billboard Touring Awards	2013	Eventful Fans' Choice Award	The Mrs. Carter Show World Tour	Nominated	
Billboard Touring Awards	2016	Top Draw	Beyoncé	Nominated	
Billboard Touring Awards	2016	Top Tour	The Formation World Tour	Nominated	
Billboard Touring Awards	2016	Concert Marketing & Promotion Award	The Formation World Tour	Nominated	
Billboard Touring Awards	2018	Top Draw	The Carters	Nominated	
Billboard Touring Awards	2018	Top Tour	On the Run II Tour (with Jay-Z)	Nominated	
Billboard Touring Awards	2018	Top World Tour	On the Run II Tour (with Jay-Z)	Nominated	
Billboard Women in Music	2009	Woman of the Year	Beyoncé	Won	
BEFFTA Awards (Note: BEFFTA Awards is a distinctly special awards ceremony honouring the best showbiz, entertainment and high profile personalities in different sectors and industries from the black and ethnic communities in the United Kingdom, United States of America, Africa, Caribbean, Canada, Asia, Australia, Europe and globally.)	2009	Best International Act	Beyoncé	Won	
BEFFTA Awards	2010	Best International Act	Beyoncé	Nominated	
BEFFTA Awards	2014	Best International Act	Beyoncé	Nominated	
BEFFTA Awards	2015	Best International Act	Beyoncé	Nominated	
BEFFTA Awards	2016	Best International Act	Beyoncé	Nominated	
Black Music & Entertainment Walk of Fame	2021	Inaugural inductee	Beyoncé	Won	
Black Reel Awards	2001	Outstanding Original Song	"Independent Women Part I"	Nominated	
Black Reel Awards	2003	Outstanding Original Song	"Work It Out"	Nominated	
Black Reel Awards	2003	Outstanding Breakthrough Performance	Austin Powers in Goldmember	Nominated	
Black Reel Awards	2004	Outstanding Original Song	"He Still Loves Me" (featuring Walter Williams)	Won	
Black Reel Awards	2004	Outstanding Original Soundtrack	The Fighting Temptations	Won	
Black Reel Awards	2004	Outstanding Actress	The Fighting Temptations	Nominated	
Black Reel Awards	2007	Outstanding Actress	Dreamgirls	Nominated	
Black Reel Awards	2007	Outstanding Original Song	"Listen"	Nominated	
Black Reel Awards	2007	Outstanding Original Soundtrack	Dreamgirls: Music from the Motion Picture	Won	
Black Reel Awards	2014	Outstanding Voice Performance	Epic	Nominated	
Black Reel Awards	2015	Outstanding Television Documentary or Special	On the Run Tour: Beyoncé and Jay-Z	Nominated	
Black Reel Awards	2017	Outstanding Television Documentary or Special	Lemonade	Won	
Black Reel Awards	2019	Outstanding Television Documentary or Special	Homecoming: A Film by Beyoncé	Nominated	
Black Reel Awards	2019	Outstanding Original Song	"Spirit" (from The Lion King)	Nominated	
Black Reel Awards	2021	Outstanding Television Documentary or Special	Black Is King	Nominated	
Black Reel Awards	2022	Outstanding Original Song	"Be Alive"	Nominated	
Black Reel Awards	2024	Outstanding Documentary Feature	Renaissance: A Film by Beyoncé	Nominated	
Black Reel Awards	2024	Outstanding Costume Design	Renaissance: A Film by Beyoncé	Nominated	
Black Reel Awards	2024	Outstanding Original Song	"My House"	Nominated	
Black Reel Awards	2025	Outstanding Variety, Sketch or Talk - Series or Special	Beyoncé Bowl	Nominated	
Bravo Fashion Queen Gag Award	2013	Ultimate Gag Award	Beyoncé	Won	
Bravo Otto	2006	Honorary Otto	Beyoncé	Won	
BreakTudo Awards	2019	Album of the Year	Homecoming: The Live Album	Won	
BreakTudo Awards	2019	Best Soundtrack Music	Spirit	Won	
BreakTudo Awards	2020	Collaboration of the Year	Already	Won	
BRIT Awards	2004	Best International Album	Dangerously in Love	Nominated	
BRIT Awards	2004	Best International Female Solo Artist	Beyoncé	Won	
BRIT Awards	2007	Best International Female Solo Artist	Beyoncé	Nominated	
BRIT Awards	2009	Best International Female Solo Artist	Beyoncé	Nominated	
BRIT Awards	2012	Best International Female Solo Artist	Beyoncé	Nominated	
BRIT Awards	2015	Best International Female Solo Artist	Beyoncé	Nominated	
BRIT Awards	2016	British Video of the Year	"Runnin' (Lose It All)" (Naughty Boy featuring Beyoncé and Arrow Benjamin)	Eliminated	
BRIT Awards	2017	Best International Female Solo Artist	Beyoncé	Won	
BRIT Awards	2019	Best International Group	The Carters	Won	
BRIT Awards	2023	International Artist of the Year	Beyoncé	Won	
BRIT Awards	2023	Best International Song	"Break My Soul"	Won	
BRIT Awards	2025	Best International Song	"Texas Hold 'Em"	Nominated	
BRIT Awards	2025	International Artist of the Year	Beyoncé	Nominated	
Bustle's Most Wanted Awards	2024	Best Scalp Remedy	Cécred Clarifying Shampoo & Scalp Scrub	Won	
BuzzAngle Music Awards	2016	Best Female Urban Artist of the Year (Overall)	Beyoncé	Won	
BuzzAngle Music Awards	2016	Best Female Urban Artist of the Year (Album Sales Artists)	Beyoncé	Won	
BYRDIE Beauty Awards	2024	Best Hydrating Conditioner	Cécred Moisturising Deep Conditioner	Won	
CA Award of Excellence	2024	Packaging/Design Award	Cécred	Won	
Camerimage Awards	2018	Best Music Video	"Apeshit" (with Jay-Z)	Nominated	
Camerimage Awards	2018	Best Cinematography in a Music Video	"Apeshit" (with Jay-Z)	Nominated	
Canada COSA Awards (Note: Cosmetics magazine is a trade beauty brand that has been established since 1972. With industry veteran and longtime publisher Jim Hicks at the helm, it hosts the annual Cosmetics Outstanding Achievement Awards (COSAs) and the Fragrance and Beauty Awards, and is committed to supporting and celebrating the work of Canada's beauty advisors year round through its digital publications. It is now owned by the CCTFA and has an exciting new team, headed up by editor (and self-professed beauty addict) Alex Laws.)	2011	Best Full Market Launch	Heat	Won	
Cannes Lions International Festival of Creativity	2016	Excellence in Music Video	"Formation"	Gran Prix	
Cannes Lions International Festival of Creativity	2016	Excellence in Music Video	"Runnin' (Lose It All)" (Naughty Boy featuring Beyoncé and Arrow Benjamin)	Bronze Lion	
Cannes Lions International Festival of Creativity	2021	Excellence in Music Video	"Brown Skin Girl" (with Blue Ivy Carter, Saint Jhn and Wizkid)	Gold Lion	
Cannes Lions International Festival of Creativity	2024	Brand or Product Integration in Music Content	Verizon "Can't B Broken" Commercial	Gold Lion	
Cannes Lions International Festival of Creativity	2024	Consumer Services/Business to Business | Social & Influencer	Verizon "Can't B Broken" Commercial	Bronze	
Capital FM Awards	2004	Best International Solo Artist	Beyoncé	Won	
Capri Hollywood International Film Festival	2020	Best Original Song	"Spirit" (from The Lion King)	Won	
CASH Golden Sail Most Performed Works Awards	2004	Best English Pop Work	"Crazy in Love" (featuring Jay-Z)	Won	
Channel [V] Thailand Music Video Awards	2011	Popular International Female Artist	Beyoncé	Won	
Ciclope Festival	2020	Music Video: Grand Prix	"Brown Skin Girl" (with Blue Ivy Carter, Saint Jhn and Wizkid)	Won	
Cinema Eye Honors	2019	Broadcast Film	Homecoming: A Film by Beyoncé	Nominated	
Clio Awards	2016	Best Music Video	"Formation"	Gold	
Clio Awards	2017	Best Music Video	"Sorry"	Gold	
Clio Awards	2018	Best Music Video	"Apeshit" (with Jay-Z)	Silver	
Clio Awards	2025	Creative Effectiveness	Verizon "Can't B Broken" Commercial	Gold	
Clio Awards	2025	Partnerships, Sponsorships & Collaborations	Verizon "Can't B Broken" Commercial	Gold	
Clio Awards	2025	Branded Entertainment & Content	Verizon "Can't B Broken" Commercial	Silver	
Cosmetic Executive Women	2011	Fragrance of the Year (mass)	Heat	Won	
Cosmopolitan Awards	2006	Fun, Fearless Female of the Year	Beyoncé	Won	
Cosmopolitan Holy Grail Beauty Awards	2024	Best Hair Care Game Changer	Cécred Fermented Rice & Rose Protein Ritual	Won	
Cosmopolitan Holy Grail Beauty Awards	2025	Best Deep Conditioner	Cécred Moisturising Deep Conditioner	Won	
Cosmopolitan Summer Beauty Awards	2024	Best Moisturising Hair Wash Duo	Cécred Hydrating Shampoo and Moisturising Deep Conditioner	Won	
Creative Circle Awards	2016	Best Music Promo Film	"Runnin' (Lose It All)" (Naughty Boy featuring Beyoncé and Arrow Benjamin)	Bronze	
Critics' Choice Movie Awards	2006	Best Song	"Listen"	Won	
Critics' Choice Movie Awards	2006	Best Original Soundtrack	Dreamgirls: Music from the Motion Picture	Won	
Critics' Choice Movie Awards	2006	Best Acting Ensemble	Dreamgirls	Nominated	
Critics' Choice Movie Awards	2020	Best Song	"Spirit" (from The Lion King)	Nominated	
Critics' Choice Movie Awards	2021	Best Song	"Be Alive"	Nominated	
Cyworld Digital Music Awards	2009	International Artist of the Month – September	Beyoncé	Won	
Cyworld Digital Music Awards	2009	International Artist of the Month – October	Beyoncé	Won	
The Daily Californian Art Awards	2016	Best Music Video	Lemonade	Won	
The Daily Californian Art Awards	2016	Best Billboard Top 10 Single	"Sorry"	Runner-up	
The Daily Californian Art Awards	2018	Best Music Video	"Apeshit" (with Jay-Z)	Runner-up	
The Daily Californian Art Awards	2019	Best Song	"Brown Skin Girl" (with Blue Ivy Carter, Saint Jhn and Wizkid)	Won	
The Daily Californian Art Awards	2020	Best Collaboration	"Savage (Remix)" (Megan Thee Stallion featuring Beyoncé)	Runner-up	
The Daily Californian Art Awards	2022	Artist of the Year	Beyoncé	Won	
The Daily Californian Art Awards	2022	Song of the Year	"Break My Soul"	Won	
The Daily Californian Art Awards	2022	Best Pop Album	Renaissance	Won	
Danish Music Awards	2016	International Album of the Year	Lemonade	Nominated	
Danish Music Awards	2022	International Album of the Year	Renaissance	Nominated	
Digital Spy Awards	2009	Best Moment	"Listen" (live at The X Factor with Alexandra Burke)	Won	
Dorian Awards	2015	TV Musical Performance of the Year	2014 MTV Video Music Awards performance	Nominated	
Dorian Awards	2017	TV Musical Performance of the Year	2016 MTV Video Music Awards performance	Nominated	
Dorian Awards	2017	Wilde Artist of the Year	Beyoncé	Nominated	
Dorian Awards	2022	Best TV Musical Performance	"Be Alive" (live at the 94th Academy Awards)	Won	
Dorian Awards	2025	Best TV Musical Performance	Beyoncé Bowl	Nominated	
Douban Abilu Music Awards	2017	International Pop Album of the Year	Lemonade	Won	
Duftstars Awards	2011	Best Lifestyle Damen	Heat	Won	
E! Awards	2021	Fashion Hall of Fame	Beyoncé	Inducted	
Echo Music Prize	2017	Best International Female Artist	Beyoncé	Nominated	
Effie Awards	2014	Entertainment & Sports	Pepsi "Welcoming Beyoncé to the World's Biggest Stage" Commercial	Bronze	
Effie Awards	2025	Brand Integration & Entertainment Partnerships	Verizon "Can't B Broken" Commercial	Gold	
Effie Awards	2025	Internet & Telecom	Verizon "Can't B Broken" Commercial	Gold	
Effie Awards	2025	Marketing Disruptors	Verizon "Can't B Broken" Commercial	Silver	
Effie Awards	2025	Timely Opportunity	Verizon "Can't B Broken" Commercial	Silver	
ELLE UK Future of Beauty Awards	2024	Best Curl Enhancer	Cécred Moisture Sealing Lotion	Won	
ELLE UK Future of Beauty Awards	2024	The Most Cutting Edge Products of the Year- Nourishing Hair Oil	Cécred	Won	
ELLE UK Future of Beauty Awards	2025	Best Hair Serum	Cécred Restoring Hair & Edge Drops	Won	
FiFi Awards	2005	Best National Advertising Campaign: TV	True Star	Won	
FiFi Awards	2011	Media Campaign of the Year	Heat	Nominated	
FiFi Awards	2012	Fragrance of the Year	Pulse	Nominated	
FiFi Awards	2012	Packaging of the Year	Pulse	Nominated	
FiFi Awards	2012	Consumer Choice Award	Pulse	Nominated	
Fonogram – Hungarian Music Awards	2009	Foreign Modern Dance-Pop Album of the Year	I Am... Sasha Fierce	Nominated	
Fonogram – Hungarian Music Awards	2010	Foreign Modern Pop-Rock Album of the Year	I Am... Yours: An Intimate Performance at Wynn Las Vegas	Nominated	
Fonogram – Hungarian Music Awards	2023	Foreign Modern Pop-Rock Album of the Year	Renaissance	Nominated	
Fonogram – Hungarian Music Awards	2025	Foreign Classic Pop-Rock Album or Recording of the Year	Cowboy Carter	Won	
FSEA Gold Leaf Awards (Note: The Foil & Specialty Effects Association (FSEA) invites companies in the finishing, printing, folding carton, greeting card and binding industries to submit their best work to the Annual FSEA Gold Leaf Awards Competition. Entries will be judged on design, execution and level of difficulty in more than 25 categories, with a gold, silver and bronze award presented in each category.)	2011	Difficult Application on a Folding Carton	Heat	Gold	
GAFFA Awards (Denmark)	2016	Best International Female Artist	Beyoncé	Won	
GAFFA Awards (Denmark)	2023	International Release of the Year	Renaissance	Nominated	
GAFFA Awards (Denmark)	2023	International Hit of the Year	"Break My Soul"	Nominated	
GAFFA Awards (Sweden)	2016	Best International Female Artist	Beyoncé	Won	
GAFFA Awards (Sweden)	2016	Best International Album	Lemonade	Won	
GAFFA Awards (Sweden)	2019	International Hit of the Year	"Apeshit" (with Jay-Z)	Nominated	
GAFFA Awards (Sweden)	2019	International Album of the Year	Everything is Love	Nominated	
GLAAD Media Award	2019	GLAAD Vanguard Award	Beyoncé & Jay-Z	Won	
GLAAD Media Award	2024	Special Award	Renaissance: A Film by Beyoncé	Won	
Glamour Awards	2007	International Solo Artist of the Year	Beyoncé	Won	
Glammy Awards	2009	Best Beauty Personality	Beyoncé	Won	
Global Awards	2023	Mass Appeal Award	Beyoncé	Nominated	
Global Awards	2023	Best Female	Beyoncé	Nominated	
Global Awards	2023	Best RnB or Hip Hop	Beyoncé	Nominated	
Global Awards	2023	Best Song	"Break My Soul"	Nominated	
Global Awards	2024	Best Female	Beyoncé	Nominated	
Global Awards	2024	Best RnB or Hip Hop	Beyoncé	Nominated	
Global Awards	2024	Best Fans	Beyoncé	Nominated	
Golden Boot Awards	2017	Most Unforgettable Moment of the Year	2016 CMA Awards performance (with Dixie Chicks)	Won	
Golden Boot Awards	2017	Collaboration of the Year	"Daddy Lessons (Remix)" (featuring Dixie Chicks)	Won	
Golden Raspberry Awards	2009	Worst Actress	Obsessed	Nominated	
Golden Spirit Award	2007	Best Soundtrack Album	Dreamgirls: Music from the Motion Picture	Won	
Gospel Touch Music Awards	2014	Song of the Year	"Say Yes" (Michelle Williams featuring Beyoncé and Kelly Rowland)	Won	
Grammis Awards	2012	Best International Album	4	Nominated	
Grierson Awards	2019	Best Arts or Music Documentary	Homecoming: A Film by Beyoncé	Shortlisted	
Grio Awards	2010	Honoree for Musicians	Beyoncé	Won	
Guild of Music Supervisors Awards	2019	Best Song Written and/or Recorded for a Film	"Spirit" (from The Lion King)	Nominated	
GV Music & Fashion Awards (Note: The GV Music & Fashion Awards, also known as Groovevolt, was an online music award established by the Groovevolt.com. The website's leading music sites with more than 7.5 million page views and more than 500,000 unique users each month.)	2004	Best R&B/Soul Album (Female)	Dangerously in Love	Won	
GV Music & Fashion Awards	2004	Most Fashionable Artist	Beyoncé	Won	
GV Music & Fashion Awards	2005	Most Fashionable Music Video	"Naughty Girl"	Won	
Harper's Bazaar Best of Beauty Awards	2024	Best of Hair: Best for Damaged Hair	Cécred Fermented Rice & Rose Protein Ritual	Won	
Harper's Bazaar Best of Beauty Awards	2025	Best of Hair: The Best Hair Oil	Cécred Nourishing Hair Oil	Won	
HBCU NY Classic	2022	Impact Award	Beyoncé	Won	
Hiphop.de Awards	2018	Best International Live Act	The Carters	Won	
HipHopDX Awards	2017	Video of the Year	Lemonade	Won	
HipHopDX Awards	2022	R&B Album of the Year	Renaissance	Won	
Hip-Hop Summit Action Network Action Award	2004	Special Youth and Community Empowerment Award	Beyoncé	Won	
Hip-Hop Summit Action Network Action Award	2007	Global Achievement Award for Economic Empowerment	Beyoncé	Won	
Hit FM Music Awards	2007	Top 10 Singles of the Year	Irreplaceable	Won	
Hit FM Music Awards	2010	Best Live Performance in China	I Am... Tour	Won	
Hit FM Music Awards	2023	Party Anthem of the Year	"Break My Soul"	Won	
Hit FM Music Awards	2025	Top 10 Singles of the Year	"Texas Hold 'Em"	Won	
Hito Music Awards	2023	Best Western Song	"Break My Soul"	Won	
Hollywood Music in Media Awards	2019	Best Original Song	"Spirit" (from The Lion King)	Nominated	
Hollywood Music in Media Awards	2021	Best Original Song in a Feature Film	"Be Alive"	Nominated	
Hong Kong Top Sales Music Awards	2003	Best Foreign Sales Releases	Dangerously in Love	Won	
Huading Awards	2020	Best Global Original Song	"Spirit" (from The Lion King)	Won	
IFPI Awards	2003	Platinum Europe Award	Dangerously in Love	Won	
IFPI Awards	2007	Platinum Europe Award	B'Day	Won	
IFPI Awards	2016	Global Top Album of 2016	Lemonade	Won	
IDA Documentary Awards (Note: The IDA Documentary Awards is the world's most prestigious event dedicated to the documentary genre, celebrating the best nonfiction films and programs of the year. It seeks to represent excellence in the documentary field from around the world, by emerging and established documentarians.)	2019	Best Music Documentary	Homecoming: A Film by Beyoncé	Won	
iHeartRadio Music Awards	2015	Hip-Hop/R&B Song of the Year	"Flawless" (featuring Chimamanda Ngozi Adichie)	Nominated	
iHeartRadio Music Awards	2015	Hip-Hop/R&B Song of the Year	"Drunk in Love" (featuring Jay-Z)	Nominated	
iHeartRadio Music Awards	2015	Best Fan Army	BeyHive	Nominated	
iHeartRadio Music Awards	2016	R&B Artist of the Year	Beyoncé	Nominated	
iHeartRadio Music Awards	2017	R&B Artist of the Year	Beyoncé	Nominated	
iHeartRadio Music Awards	2017	R&B Song of the Year	"Sorry"	Nominated	
iHeartRadio Music Awards	2017	Best Music Video	"Formation"	Nominated	
iHeartRadio Music Awards	2017	Best Fan Army	BeyHive	Nominated	
iHeartRadio Music Awards	2018	Fan Fave Video	"Apeshit" (with Jay-Z)	Nominated	
iHeartRadio Music Awards	2018	Best Direction	"Apeshit" (with Jay-Z)	Nominated	
iHeartRadio Music Awards	2018	Best Hip Hop Artist or Group	The Carters	Nominated	
iHeartRadio Music Awards	2018	Best Remix	"Mi Gente" (J Balvin and Willy William featuring Beyoncé)	Nominated	
iHeartRadio Music Awards	2020	R&B Song of the Year	"Before I Let Go"	Nominated	
iHeartRadio Music Awards	2021	Hip-Hop Song of the Year	"Savage (Remix)" (Megan Thee Stallion featuring Beyoncé)	Nominated	
iHeartRadio Music Awards	2021	Best Collaboration	"Savage (Remix)" (Megan Thee Stallion featuring Beyoncé)	Won	
iHeartRadio Music Awards	2023	Artist of the Year	Beyoncé	Nominated	
iHeartRadio Music Awards	2023	R&B Album of the Year	Renaissance	Won	
iHeartRadio Music Awards	2023	R&B Song of the Year	"Break My Soul"	Nominated	
iHeartRadio Music Awards	2023	Best Use of a Sample	"Summer Renaissance"	Nominated	
iHeartRadio Music Awards	2023	TikTok Bop of the Year	"Cuff It"	Nominated	
iHeartRadio Music Awards	2023	Best Fan Army	BeyHive	Nominated	
iHeartRadio Music Awards	2024	iHeartRadio Innovator Award	Beyoncé	Won	
iHeartRadio Music Awards	2026	Favorite Tour Style	Cowboy Carter Tour	Nominated	
iHeartRadio Music Awards	2026	Favorite Tour Tradition	Blue Ivy and Rumi on stage	Nominated	
iHeartRadio Music Awards	2026	Fan Favorite Live Performer of the Year	Beyoncé	Nominated	
Industry Dance Awards	2013	Favorite Dance Performance on Television	Super Bowl XLVII halftime show	Won	
Industry Dance Awards	2013	Favorite Pop Star	Beyoncé	Nominated	
Industry Dance Awards	2014	Favorite Pop Star	Beyoncé	Won	
Industry Dance Awards	2015	America's Favorite Performance	MTV VMA: Beyoncé's Video Vanguard Medley Performance	Nominated	
Industry Dance Awards	2016	Favorite Pop Star	Beyoncé	Nominated	
Insider's End of Year Awards	2022	Album of the Year	Renaissance	Won	
International Hologram Manufacturers Association Awards	2011	Best Applied Decorative Product	Pulse	Won	
International Dance Music Awards	2004	Best R&B/Urban Dance Track	"Crazy in Love" (featuring Jay-Z)	Won	
International Dance Music Awards	2007	Best R&B/Urban Dance Track	"Déjà Vu" (featuring Jay-Z)	Nominated	
International Dance Music Awards	2007	Best Pop Dance Track	"Déjà Vu" (featuring Jay-Z)	Nominated	
International Dance Music Awards	2007	Best Rap/Hip-Hop Track	"Check on It" (featuring Bun B and Slim Thug)	Nominated	
International Dance Music Awards	2009	Best R&B/Urban Dance Track	"Single Ladies (Put a Ring on It)"	Nominated	
International Dance Music Awards	2010	Best R&B/Urban Dance Track	"Sweet Dreams"	Nominated	
International Dance Music Awards	2010	Best Solo Artist	Beyoncé	Nominated	
International Dance Music Awards	2011	Best Music Video	"Telephone" (Lady Gaga featuring Beyoncé)	Nominated	
International Dance Music Awards	2012	Best R&B/Urban Dance Track	"Run the World (Girls)"	Nominated	
International Dance Music Awards	2015	Best R&B/Urban Dance Track	"Flawless" (featuring Chimamanda Ngozi Adichie)	Nominated	
Italian Music Awards	2003	Best International Female Artist	Beyoncé	Nominated	
Ivor Novello Awards	2008	Best-selling British Single	"Beautiful Liar" (with Shakira)	Won	
Japan Gold Disc Awards	2007	Soundtrack Album of the Year	Dreamgirls: Music from the Motion Picture	Won	
J-Wave Tokio Awards	2003	Best Song	"Crazy in Love" (featuring Jay-Z)	Won	
JIM Awards	2014	Best Live Act	Beyoncé	Won	
JIM Awards	2015	Best Female International	Beyoncé	Nominated	
JIM Awards	2015	Best Urban	Beyoncé	Won	
JIM Awards	2015	Best Live Act	Beyoncé	Nominated	
Kingsizegala	2015	This year's Foreign Soul/R&B	Beyoncé	Won	
Kinsale Sharks Awards	2015	Best International Music Video	"Formation"	Won	
Kora Awards	2012	Best Female African-American Artist of the Diaspora	Beyoncé	Nominated	
Latina Beauty Awards	2014	Styling Product for Holding your Style	Rise	Won	
Latin American Music Awards	2018	Single of the Year	"Mi Gente" (J Balvin and Willy William featuring Beyoncé)	Nominated	
Latin American Music Awards	2018	Favorite Urban Song	"Mi Gente" (J Balvin and Willy William featuring Beyoncé)	Nominated	
Latin Music Italian Awards	2017	Best Latin Collaboration of the Year	"Mi Gente" (J Balvin and Willy William featuring Beyoncé)	Nominated	
Las Culturistas Culture Awards	2023	Tom and Rita Couple Award	Beyoncé & Jay-Z	Won	
Las Culturistas Culture Awards	2023	Best Holiday - Fixed Dated	September 4 B'Day	Won	
Las Culturistas Culture Awards	2024	Best Collection of Sounds Together	Cowboy Carter	Won	
Las Culturistas Culture Awards	2024	Most Shocking Moment of the Year	Verizon "Can't B Broken" Commercial	Won	
Las Culturistas Culture Awards	2025	Best Live Outdoor Performance	Cowboy Carter	Won	
Life & Style Magazine's Stylemaker's Awards	2006	Triple Threat	Beyoncé	Won	
Lift Effects Star Award (Note: LIFTEFFECTS, a company that hosts conferences, seminars workshops and provides a speaking platform for extraordinary people to share their stories and aims to plant the seed of hope, passion, and encouragement so that everyone can reach their goals and believe in themselves. Extraordinary ladies were awarded for their outstanding work, Beyoncé was one of the 62 honorees in 2015.)	2015	Honoree	Beyoncé	Won	
London International Awards	2016	Best Music Video	"Formation"	Bronze	
London International Awards	2024	Zeitgeist | Branded Entertainment	Verizon "Can't B Broken" Commercial	Bronze	
London International Awards	2024	Best Use of Strategic Partnership | Creativity In PR	Verizon "Can't B Broken" Commercial	Bronze	
Lo Nuestro Awards	2008	Breakout Artist or Group of the Year	Beyoncé	Nominated	
Los Premios 40 Principales	2008	Career Achievement Award	Beyoncé	Won	
Los Premios 40 Principales	2009	Best International Artist	Beyoncé	Nominated	
Los Premios 40 Principales	2016	Best International Video	"Runnin' (Lose It All)" (Naughty Boy featuring Beyoncé and Arrow Benjamin)	Nominated	
Los Premios 40 Principales	2016	Best Tour	The Formation World Tour	Nominated	
Los Premios 40 Principales	2018	Best International Song	"Perfect Duet" (with Ed Sheeran)	Nominated	
Love Perfume? Awards	2011	Best Celebrity Launch	Heat	Won	
Lunas del Auditorio	2014	Best Foreign Language Pop Artist	Beyoncé	Won	
Marie Claire Skin & Hair Awards	2024	Best New Black-Owned Brand	Cécred Reconstructing Treatment Mask	Won	
Marie Claire Skin & Hair Awards	2025	Best Edges Product	Cécred Restoring Hair and Edge Drops	Won	
Marie Claire Skin & Hair Awards	2025	Best Nourishing Hair Oil	Cécred Nourishing Hair Oil	Won	
Meteor Ireland Music Award	2004	Best Female Singer	Beyoncé	Won	
Meteor Ireland Music Award	2009	Best International Female	Beyoncé	Nominated	
MOBO Awards	2003	Best R&B Act	Beyoncé	Nominated	
MOBO Awards	2003	Best Video	"Crazy in Love" (featuring Jay-Z)	Nominated	
MOBO Awards	2003	Best Single	"Crazy in Love" (featuring Jay-Z)	Nominated	
MOBO Awards	2003	Best Album	Dangerously in Love	Nominated	
MOBO Awards	2004	Best R&B Act	Beyoncé	Nominated	
MOBO Awards	2006	Best Song	"Déjà Vu" (featuring Jay-Z)	Won	
MOBO Awards	2006	Best Video	"Déjà Vu" (featuring Jay-Z)	Won	
MOBO Awards	2006	Best R&B Act	Beyoncé	Nominated	
MOBO Awards	2006	Best International Female Artist	Beyoncé	Won	
MOBO Awards	2009	Best Video	"Single Ladies (Put a Ring on It)"	Won	
MOBO Awards	2009	Best Album	I Am... Sasha Fierce	Nominated	
MOBO Awards	2009	Best International Act	Beyoncé	Won	
MOBO Awards	2011	Best International Act	Beyoncé	Nominated	
MOBO Awards	2012	Best International Act	Beyoncé	Nominated	
MOBO Awards	2014	Best International Act	Beyoncé	Won	
MOBO Awards	2016	Best International Act	Beyoncé	Nominated	
MOBO Awards	2016	Best Song	"Runnin' (Lose It All)" (Naughty Boy featuring Beyoncé and Arrow Benjamin)	Nominated	
MOBO Awards	2022	Best International Act	Beyoncé	Nominated	
MP3 Music Awards	2009	BFV Award/Best Female Vocalist	"Sweet Dreams"	Won	
MTV Africa Music Awards	2009	Best R&B	Beyoncé	Nominated	
MTV Africa Music Awards	2014	Best International Act	Beyoncé	Nominated	
MTV Africa Music Awards	2015	Best International Act	Beyoncé	Nominated	
MTV Africa Music Awards	2016	Best International Act	Beyoncé	Nominated	
MTV Asia Awards	2004	Favorite Female Artist	Beyoncé	Nominated	
MTV Australia Awards	2005	Best R&B Video	"Naughty Girl"	Nominated	
MTV Australia Awards	2005	Sexiest Video	"Naughty Girl"	Nominated	
MTV Australia Awards	2007	Video of the Year	"Irreplaceable"	Nominated	
MTV Australia Awards	2007	Best Female Artist	Beyoncé	Nominated	
MTV Australia Awards	2007	Best Hook-Up	"Déjà Vu" (featuring Jay-Z)	Nominated	
MTV Australia Awards	2007	Sexiest Video	"Déjà Vu" (featuring Jay-Z)	Nominated	
MTV Australia Awards	2009	Video of the Year	"Single Ladies (Put a Ring on It)"	Nominated	
MTV Australia Awards	2009	Best Moves	"Single Ladies (Put a Ring on It)"	Nominated	
MTV Europe Music Awards	2002	Best R&B	Beyoncé	Nominated	
MTV Europe Music Awards	2003	Best R&B	Beyoncé	Won	
MTV Europe Music Awards	2003	Best Female	Beyoncé	Nominated	
MTV Europe Music Awards	2003	Best Song	"Crazy in Love" (featuring Jay-Z)	Won	
MTV Europe Music Awards	2004	Best Female	Beyoncé	Nominated	
MTV Europe Music Awards	2004	Best R&B	Beyoncé	Nominated	
MTV Europe Music Awards	2004	Best Album	Dangerously in Love	Nominated	
MTV Europe Music Awards	2006	Best Female	Beyoncé	Nominated	
MTV Europe Music Awards	2006	Best R&B	Beyoncé	Nominated	
MTV Europe Music Awards	2007	Ultimate Urban	Beyoncé	Nominated	
MTV Europe Music Awards	2007	Headliner of the Year	Beyoncé	Nominated	
MTV Europe Music Awards	2007	Most Addictive Track	"Beautiful Liar" (with Shakira)	Nominated	
MTV Europe Music Awards	2008	Ultimate Urban	Beyoncé	Nominated	
MTV Europe Music Awards	2009	Best Live Act	Beyoncé	Nominated	
MTV Europe Music Awards	2009	Best Female	Beyoncé	Won	
MTV Europe Music Awards	2009	Best Song	"Halo"	Won	
MTV Europe Music Awards	2009	Best Video	"Single Ladies (Put a Ring on It)"	Won	
MTV Europe Music Awards	2010	Best Video	"Telephone" (Lady Gaga featuring Beyoncé)	Nominated	
MTV Europe Music Awards	2011	Best Female	Beyoncé	Nominated	
MTV Europe Music Awards	2011	Best North American Act	Beyoncé	Nominated	
MTV Europe Music Awards	2011	Best Video	"Run the World (Girls)"	Nominated	
MTV Europe Music Awards	2013	Best Live Act	Beyoncé	Won	
MTV Europe Music Awards	2014	Best US Act	Beyoncé	Nominated	
MTV Europe Music Awards	2014	Best Female	Beyoncé	Nominated	
MTV Europe Music Awards	2014	Best Live Act	Beyoncé	Nominated	
MTV Europe Music Awards	2014	Best Video with a Social Message	"Pretty Hurts"	Won	
MTV Europe Music Awards	2015	Best US Act	Beyoncé	Nominated	
MTV Europe Music Awards	2016	Best US Act	Beyoncé	Nominated	
MTV Europe Music Awards	2016	Best Female	Beyoncé	Nominated	
MTV Europe Music Awards	2016	Best Live Act	Beyoncé	Nominated	
MTV Europe Music Awards	2016	Biggest Fans	Beyoncé	Nominated	
MTV Europe Music Awards	2016	Best Video	"Formation"	Nominated	
MTV Europe Music Awards	2018	Best Video	"Apeshit" (with Jay-Z)	Nominated	
MTV Europe Music Awards	2018	Best Live	The Carters	Nominated	
MTV Europe Music Awards	2022	Best Artist	Beyoncé	Nominated	
MTV Europe Music Awards	2024	Best Artist	Beyoncé	Nominated	
MTV Europe Music Awards	2024	Best Fans	Beyoncé	Nominated	
MTV Europe Music Awards	2024	Best US Act	Beyoncé	Nominated	
MTV Europe Music Awards	2024	Best Song	"Texas Hold 'Em"	Nominated	
MTV Millennial Awards	2018	Most Ridiculous of the Year	Beyoncé	Nominated	
MTV Millennial Awards	2018	Hit of the Year	"Mi Gente" (J Balvin and Willy William featuring Beyoncé)	Nominated	
MTV Movie & TV Awards	2003	Best Breakthrough Performance	Austin Powers in Goldmember	Nominated	
MTV Movie & TV Awards	2006	Sexiest Performance	The Pink Panther	Nominated	
MTV Movie & TV Awards	2007	Best Breakthrough Performance	Dreamgirls	Nominated	
MTV Movie & TV Awards	2010	Best Fight (Note: Shared with Ali Larter.)	Obsessed	Won	
MTV Movie & TV Awards	2017	Trending Award (Note: Shared with Channing Tatum.)	Lip Sync Battle	Won	
MTV Movie & TV Awards	2021	Best Musical Moment	"Brown Skin Girl" (with Blue Ivy Carter, Saint Jhn and Wizkid)	Nominated	
MTV Video Music Awards	2003	Best Female Video	"Crazy in Love" (featuring Jay-Z)	Won	
MTV Video Music Awards	2003	Best R&B Video	"Crazy in Love" (featuring Jay-Z)	Won	
MTV Video Music Awards	2003	Best Choreography in a Video	"Crazy in Love" (featuring Jay-Z)	Won	
MTV Video Music Awards	2003	Viewer's Choice	"Crazy in Love" (featuring Jay-Z)	Nominated	
MTV Video Music Awards	2004	Best Female Video	"Naughty Girl"	Won	
MTV Video Music Awards	2004	Best Dance Video	"Naughty Girl"	Nominated	
MTV Video Music Awards	2004	Best Cinematography in a Video	"Naughty Girl"	Nominated	
MTV Video Music Awards	2004	Best Choreography in a Video	"Naughty Girl"	Nominated	
MTV Video Music Awards	2004	Best R&B Video	"Me, Myself and I"	Nominated	
MTV Video Music Awards	2006	Best R&B Video	"Check on It" (featuring Bun B and Slim Thug)	Won	
MTV Video Music Awards	2007	Video of the Year	"Irreplaceable"	Nominated	
MTV Video Music Awards	2007	Most Earthshattering Collaboration	"Beautiful Liar" (with Shakira)	Won	
MTV Video Music Awards	2007	Best Director	"Beautiful Liar" (with Shakira)	Nominated	
MTV Video Music Awards	2007	Best Editing in a Video	"Beautiful Liar" (with Shakira)	Nominated	
MTV Video Music Awards	2007	Best Choreography in a Video	"Beautiful Liar" (with Shakira)	Nominated	
MTV Video Music Awards	2007	Quadruple Threat of the Year	Beyoncé	Nominated	
MTV Video Music Awards	2007	Female Artist of the Year	Beyoncé	Nominated	
MTV Video Music Awards	2009	Video of the Year	"Single Ladies (Put a Ring on It)"	Won	
MTV Video Music Awards	2009	Best Female Video	"Single Ladies (Put a Ring on It)"	Nominated	
MTV Video Music Awards	2009	Best Pop Video	"Single Ladies (Put a Ring on It)"	Nominated	
MTV Video Music Awards	2009	Best Editing	"Single Ladies (Put a Ring on It)"	Won	
MTV Video Music Awards	2009	Best Direction	"Single Ladies (Put a Ring on It)"	Nominated	
MTV Video Music Awards	2009	Best Special Effects	"Single Ladies (Put a Ring on It)"	Nominated	
MTV Video Music Awards	2009	Best Art Direction	"Single Ladies (Put a Ring on It)"	Nominated	
MTV Video Music Awards	2009	Best Cinematography	"Single Ladies (Put a Ring on It)"	Nominated	
MTV Video Music Awards	2009	Best Choreography	"Single Ladies (Put a Ring on It)"	Won	
MTV Video Music Awards	2010	Video of the Year	"Video Phone" (featuring Lady Gaga)	Nominated	
MTV Video Music Awards	2010	Best Collaboration	"Video Phone" (featuring Lady Gaga)	Nominated	
MTV Video Music Awards	2010	Best Female Video	"Video Phone" (featuring Lady Gaga)	Nominated	
MTV Video Music Awards	2010	Best Pop Video	"Video Phone" (featuring Lady Gaga)	Nominated	
MTV Video Music Awards	2010	Best Art Direction	"Video Phone" (featuring Lady Gaga)	Nominated	
MTV Video Music Awards	2010	Best Choreography	"Video Phone" (featuring Lady Gaga)	Nominated	
MTV Video Music Awards	2010	Best Collaboration	"Telephone" (Lady Gaga featuring Beyoncé)	Won	
MTV Video Music Awards	2011	Best Female Video	"Run the World (Girls)"	Nominated	
MTV Video Music Awards	2011	Best Choreography	"Run the World (Girls)"	Won	
MTV Video Music Awards	2011	Best Cinematography	"Run the World (Girls)"	Nominated	
MTV Video Music Awards	2012	Best Female Video	"Love On Top"	Nominated	
MTV Video Music Awards	2012	Best Editing	"Countdown"	Won	
MTV Video Music Awards	2012	Best Choreography	"Countdown"	Nominated	
MTV Video Music Awards	2012	Most Share-Worthy Video	"Countdown"	Nominated	
MTV Video Music Awards	2013	Best Video with a Social Message	"I Was Here"	Nominated	
MTV Video Music Awards	2014	Best Female Video	"Love On Top"	Nominated	
MTV Video Music Awards	2014	Video of the Year	"Drunk in Love" (featuring Jay-Z)	Nominated	
MTV Video Music Awards	2014	Best Collaboration	"Drunk in Love" (featuring Jay-Z)	Won	
MTV Video Music Awards	2014	Best Female Video	"Partition"	Nominated	
MTV Video Music Awards	2014	Best Choreography	"Partition"	Nominated	
MTV Video Music Awards	2014	Best Cinematography	"Pretty Hurts"	Won	
MTV Video Music Awards	2014	Best Direction	"Pretty Hurts"	Nominated	
MTV Video Music Awards	2014	Best Editing	"Pretty Hurts"	Nominated	
MTV Video Music Awards	2014	Best Video with a Social Message	"Pretty Hurts"	Won	
MTV Video Music Awards	2014	Michael Jackson Video Vanguard Award	Herself	Won	
MTV Video Music Awards	2015	Best Female Video	"Love On Top"	Nominated	
MTV Video Music Awards	2015	Video of the Year	"7/11"	Nominated	
MTV Video Music Awards	2015	Best Pop Video	"7/11"	Nominated	
MTV Video Music Awards	2015	Best Female Video	"7/11"	Nominated	
MTV Video Music Awards	2015	Best Choreography	"7/11"	Nominated	
MTV Video Music Awards	2015	Best Editing	"7/11"	Won	
MTV Video Music Awards	2016	Best Female Video	"Love On Top"	Nominated	
MTV Video Music Awards	2016	Video of the Year	"Formation"	Won	
MTV Video Music Awards	2016	Best Pop Video	"Formation"	Won	
MTV Video Music Awards	2016	Best Direction	"Formation"	Won	
MTV Video Music Awards	2016	Best Cinematography	"Formation"	Won	
MTV Video Music Awards	2016	Best Editing	"Formation"	Won	
MTV Video Music Awards	2016	Best Choreography	"Formation"	Won	
MTV Video Music Awards	2016	Best Choreography	"Sorry"	Nominated	
MTV Video Music Awards	2016	Best Female Video	"Hold Up"	Won	
MTV Video Music Awards	2016	Best Art Direction	"Hold Up"	Nominated	
MTV Video Music Awards	2016	Best Collaboration	"Freedom" (featuring Kendrick Lamar)	Nominated	
MTV Video Music Awards	2016	Breakthrough Long Form Video	Lemonade	Won	
MTV Video Music Awards	2018	Video of the Year	"Apeshit" (with Jay-Z)	Nominated	
MTV Video Music Awards	2018	Best Collaboration	"Apeshit" (with Jay-Z)	Nominated	
MTV Video Music Awards	2018	Best Hip Hop	"Apeshit" (with Jay-Z)	Nominated	
MTV Video Music Awards	2018	Best Cinematography	"Apeshit" (with Jay-Z)	Won	
MTV Video Music Awards	2018	Best Editing	"Apeshit" (with Jay-Z)	Nominated	
MTV Video Music Awards	2018	Best Direction	"Apeshit" (with Jay-Z)	Nominated	
MTV Video Music Awards	2018	Best Choreography	"Apeshit" (with Jay-Z)	Nominated	
MTV Video Music Awards	2018	Best Art Direction	"Apeshit" (with Jay-Z)	Won	
MTV Video Music Awards	2018	Best Visual Effects	"Walk on Water" (with Eminem)	Nominated	
MTV Video Music Awards	2020	Song of Summer	"Savage (Remix)" (Megan Thee Stallion featuring Beyoncé)	Nominated	
MTV Video Music Awards	2021	Best R&B	"Brown Skin Girl" (with Blue Ivy Carter, Saint Jhn and Wizkid)	Nominated	
MTV Video Music Awards	2021	Best Cinematography	"Brown Skin Girl" (with Blue Ivy Carter, Saint Jhn and Wizkid)	Won	
MTV Video Music Awards	2021	Best Art Direction	"Already" (with Shatta Wale and Major Lazer)	Nominated	
MTV Video Music Awards	2022	Song of Summer	"Break My Soul"	Nominated	
MTV Video Music Awards	2023	Artist of the Year	Beyoncé	Nominated	
MTV Video Music Awards	2023	Show of the Summer	Renaissance World Tour	Nominated	
MTV Video Music Awards	2023	Song of Summer	"Cuff It"	Nominated	
MTV Video Music Awards	2023	Album of the Year	Renaissance	Nominated	
MTV Video Music Awards	2024	Song of the Year	"Texas Hold 'Em"	Nominated	
MTV Video Music Awards	2024	Best Trending Video	"Texas Hold 'Em"	Nominated	
MTV Video Music Awards	2024	VMAs Most Iconic Performance	"Love On Top"	Nominated	
MTV Video Music Awards	2025	Artist of the Year	Beyoncé	Nominated	
MTV Video Music Awards Japan	2002	Best Video from a Film	"Independent Women Part I"	Nominated	
MTV Video Music Awards Japan	2003	Best Video from a Film	"Work It Out"	Nominated	
MTV Video Music Awards Japan	2004	Best Female Video	"Crazy in Love" (featuring Jay-Z)	Nominated	
MTV Video Music Awards Japan	2004	Best Collaboration	"Crazy in Love" (featuring Jay-Z)	Won	
MTV Video Music Awards Japan	2006	Best R&B Video	"Stand Up for Love"	Nominated	
MTV Video Music Awards Japan	2007	Best Video from a Film	"Listen"	Nominated	
MTV Video Music Awards Japan	2009	Best Female Video	"If I Were a Boy"	Nominated	
MTV Video Music Awards Japan	2010	Best Collaboration	"Telephone" (Lady Gaga featuring Beyoncé)	Nominated	
MTV Video Music Awards Japan	2012	Best Pop Video	"Run the World (Girls)"	Nominated	
MTV Video Music Awards Japan	2012	Best Choreography	"Run the World (Girls)"	Nominated	
MTV Video Music Awards Japan	2014	Best Album of the Year	Beyoncé	Nominated	
MTV Video Music Awards Japan	2014	Best Female Video	"Drunk in Love" (featuring Jay-Z)	Nominated	
MTV Video Music Awards Japan	2014	Best R&B Video	"Drunk in Love" (featuring Jay-Z)	Nominated	
MTV Video Music Awards Japan	2016	Best Album of the Year	Lemonade	Won	
MTV Video Music Awards Japan	2016	Best Female Video	"Formation"	Nominated	
MTV Video Music Brazil Awards	2004	Best International Video	"Baby Boy" (featuring Sean Paul)	Nominated	
MTV Video Music Brazil Awards	2005	Best International Video	"Lose My Breath"	Nominated	
MTV Video Music Brazil Awards	2009	Best International Artist	Beyoncé	Nominated	
MTV Video Music Brazil Awards	2010	Best International Artist	Beyoncé	Nominated	
MTV Video Music Brazil Awards	2011	Best International Artist	Beyoncé	Nominated	
MTV Video Play Awards	2007	Most Played Music Video of The Year	"Beautiful Liar" (with Shakira)	Won	
MTV Video Play Awards	2011	Most Played Music Video of The Year	"Telephone" (Lady Gaga featuring Beyoncé)	Won	
MTV Video Play Awards	2012	Most Played Music Video of The Year	"Best Thing I Never Had"	Won	
MTV Video Play Awards	2012	Most Played Music Video of The Year	"Run the World (Girls)"	Won	
MTV Video Play Awards	2016	Most Played Music Video of The Year	"Sorry"	Won	
MTV Video Play Awards	2016	Most Played Music Video of The Year	"Hymn for the Weekend" (Coldplay featuring Beyoncé)	Won	
MTV Italian Music Awards (Note: Previously known as TRL Awards (2006–2012).)	2009	First Lady of TRL	Beyoncé	Nominated	
MTV Italian Music Awards	2009	Nokia Playlist Generation	"Single Ladies (Put a Ring on It)"	Won	
MTV Italian Music Awards	2014	Vogue Eyewear Best Look	Beyoncé	Nominated	
MTV Italian Music Awards	2014	Artist Saga Award	Beyoncé	Nominated	
MTV Italian Music Awards	2015	Artist Saga Award	Beyoncé	Nominated	
MTV Italian Music Awards	2015	Top Instagram Star	Beyoncé	Nominated	
MTV Italian Music Awards	2015	#MTVAwardsStar	Beyoncé	Nominated	
MTV Italian Music Awards	2016	Artist Saga Award	Beyoncé	Nominated	
MTV Italian Music Awards	2016	#MTVAwardsStar	Beyoncé	Nominated	
MTV Italian Music Awards	2017	Artist Saga Award	Beyoncé	Nominated	
MTV TRL Award	2004	First Lady of TRL	Beyoncé	Won	
MTV Woodies	2014	Did It My Way	Beyoncé	Won	
Much Music Video Awards	2003	Best International Artist Video	"Work It Out"	Nominated	
Much Music Video Awards	2004	Best International Artist Video	"Crazy in Love" (featuring Jay-Z)	Won	
Much Music Video Awards	2004	Favourite International Artist	Beyoncé	Nominated	
Much Music Video Awards	2007	Best International Artist Video	"Beautiful Liar" (with Shakira)	Nominated	
Much Music Video Awards	2009	Best International Artist Video	"Single Ladies (Put a Ring on It)"	Nominated	
Much Music Video Awards	2010	Best International Artist Video	"Telephone" (Lady Gaga featuring Beyoncé)	Won	
Much Music Video Awards	2010	Favourite International Artist	Beyoncé	Nominated	
Much Music Video Awards	2011	Best Watched Video	"Why Don't You Love Me"	Nominated	
Much Music Video Awards	2004	Best International Artist Video	"Run the World (Girls)"	Nominated	
Much Music Video Awards	2004	Best Watched Video	"Countdown"	Nominated	
Much Music Video Awards	2014	Best International Artist Video	"Drunk in Love" (featuring Jay-Z)	Nominated	
Much Music Video Awards	2017	Favourite International Artist	Beyoncé	Nominated	
Much Music Video Awards	2018	Fan Fave Video	"Apeshit" (with Jay-Z)	Nominated	
Much Music Video Awards	2018	Best Direction	"Apeshit" (with Jay-Z)	Nominated	
Much Music Video Awards	2018	Best Hip Hop Artist or Group	The Carters	Nominated	
Music Choice Awards	2007	Most Demanded ’07 Artist of the Year	Beyoncé	Won	
MVPA Awards	2004	Best Choreography	"Crazy in Love" (featuring Jay-Z)	Won	
MVPA Awards	2004	Best Colorist/Telecine	"Crazy in Love" (featuring Jay-Z)	Won	
MVPA Awards	2004	Best R&B Video	"Crazy in Love" (featuring Jay-Z)	Won	
MVPA Awards	2007	Best R&B Video	"Déjà Vu" (featuring Jay-Z)	Won	
MVPA Awards	2020	Best Styling in a Video	"Already" (with Shatta Wale and Major Lazer)	Won	
Music Vision Award	2004	Video of the Year	"Crazy in Love" (featuring Jay-Z)	Won	
Music Vision Award	2004	Best Urban Video	"Crazy in Love" (featuring Jay-Z)	Won	
Myx Music Awards	2011	Favorite International Video	"Telephone" (Lady Gaga featuring Beyoncé)	Nominated	
Myx Music Awards	2015	Favorite International Video	"Drunk in Love" (featuring Jay-Z)	Nominated	
Mü-Yap Turkish Music Industry Awards	2008	Best Single	"Beautiful Liar" (with Shakira)	Won	
NAACP Image Awards	2004	Entertainer of the Year	Beyoncé	Won	
NAACP Image Awards	2004	Outstanding Female Artist	Beyoncé	Nominated	
NAACP Image Awards	2004	Outstanding New Artist	Beyoncé	Nominated	
NAACP Image Awards	2004	Outstanding Actress in a Motion Picture	The Fighting Temptations	Nominated	
NAACP Image Awards	2004	Outstanding Song	"Crazy in Love" (featuring Jay-Z)	Nominated	
NAACP Image Awards	2004	Outstanding Music Video	"Crazy in Love" (featuring Jay-Z)	Nominated	
NAACP Image Awards	2007	Outstanding Female Artist	Beyoncé	Nominated	
NAACP Image Awards	2007	Outstanding Actress in a Motion Picture	Dreamgirls	Nominated	
NAACP Image Awards	2007	Outstanding Album	Dreamgirls	Won	
NAACP Image Awards	2007	Outstanding Album	B'Day	Nominated	
NAACP Image Awards	2007	Outstanding Song	"Irreplaceable"	Nominated	
NAACP Image Awards	2007	Outstanding Music Video	"Irreplaceable"	Nominated	
NAACP Image Awards	2008	Outstanding Female Artist	Beyoncé	Nominated	
NAACP Image Awards	2008	Outstanding Music Video	"Beautiful Liar" (with Shakira)	Nominated	
NAACP Image Awards	2009	Outstanding Female Artist	Beyoncé	Won	
NAACP Image Awards	2009	Outstanding Album	I Am... Sasha Fierce	Nominated	
NAACP Image Awards	2009	Outstanding Song	"Single Ladies (Put a Ring on It)"	Nominated	
NAACP Image Awards	2009	Outstanding Music Video	"Single Ladies (Put a Ring on It)"	Nominated	
NAACP Image Awards	2009	Outstanding Music Video	"If I Were a Boy"	Nominated	
NAACP Image Awards	2010	Outstanding Supporting Actress in a Motion Picture	Cadillac Records	Nominated	
NAACP Image Awards	2011	Outstanding Variety – Series or Special	I Am... World Tour	Nominated	
NAACP Image Awards	2011	Outstanding Music Video	"Why Don't You Love Me"	Nominated	
NAACP Image Awards	2012	Outstanding Female Artist	Beyoncé	Nominated	
NAACP Image Awards	2012	Outstanding Album	4	Nominated	
NAACP Image Awards	2012	Outstanding Song	"Best Thing I Never Had"	Nominated	
NAACP Image Awards	2012	Outstanding Music Video	"I Was Here"	Nominated	
NAACP Image Awards	2014	Entertainer of the Year	Beyoncé	Nominated	
NAACP Image Awards	2014	Outstanding Female Artist	Beyoncé	Won	
NAACP Image Awards	2014	Outstanding Documentary	Life Is But a Dream	Nominated	
NAACP Image Awards	2015	Entertainer of the Year	Beyoncé	Nominated	
NAACP Image Awards	2015	Outstanding Female Artist	Beyoncé	Won	
NAACP Image Awards	2015	Outstanding Variety – Series or Special	On the Run Tour: Beyoncé and Jay-Z	Nominated	
NAACP Image Awards	2015	Outstanding Album	Beyoncé (Platinum Edition)	Nominated	
NAACP Image Awards	2015	Outstanding Song	"Pretty Hurts"	Nominated	
NAACP Image Awards	2015	Outstanding Music Video	"Pretty Hurts"	Nominated	
NAACP Image Awards	2017	Entertainer of the Year	Beyoncé	Nominated	
NAACP Image Awards	2017	Outstanding Female Artist	Beyoncé	Won	
NAACP Image Awards	2017	Outstanding Variety – Series or Special	Lemonade	Nominated	
NAACP Image Awards	2017	Outstanding Album	Lemonade	Won	
NAACP Image Awards	2017	Outstanding Duo, Group or Collaboration	"Freedom" (featuring Kendrick Lamar)	Won	
NAACP Image Awards	2017	Outstanding Song	"Freedom" (featuring Kendrick Lamar)	Won	
NAACP Image Awards	2017	Outstanding Song	"Formation"	Nominated	
NAACP Image Awards	2017	Outstanding Music Video	"Formation"	Won	
NAACP Image Awards	2018	Outstanding Female Artist	Beyoncé	Nominated	
NAACP Image Awards	2019	Entertainer of the Year	Beyoncé	Won	
NAACP Image Awards	2019	Outstanding Music Video	"Apeshit" (with Jay-Z)	Nominated	
NAACP Image Awards	2019	Outstanding Album	Everything is Love	Nominated	
NAACP Image Awards	2019	Outstanding Duo or Group	Everything is Love	Nominated	
NAACP Image Awards	2020	Outstanding Female Artist	Beyoncé	Won	
NAACP Image Awards	2020	Outstanding Variety – Series or Special	Homecoming: A Film by Beyoncé	Won	
NAACP Image Awards	2020	Outstanding Documentary	Homecoming: A Film by Beyoncé	Nominated	
NAACP Image Awards	2020	Outstanding Album	Homecoming: The Live Album	Won	
NAACP Image Awards	2020	Outstanding Song – Contemporary	"Before I Let Go"	Won	
NAACP Image Awards	2020	Outstanding Song – Traditional	"Spirit" (from The Lion King)	Won	
NAACP Image Awards	2020	Outstanding Duo, Group or Collaboration	"Brown Skin Girl" (with Blue Ivy Carter, Saint Jhn and Wizkid)	Won	
NAACP Image Awards	2020	Outstanding Soundtrack/Compilation Album	The Lion King: The Gift	Won	
NAACP Image Awards	2021	Outstanding Female Artist	Beyoncé	Won	
NAACP Image Awards	2021	Outstanding Variety Show	Black Is King	Nominated	
NAACP Image Awards	2021	Outstanding Directing in a Television Movie or Special	Black Is King	Nominated	
NAACP Image Awards	2021	Outstanding Music Video/Visual Album	Black Is King	Nominated	
NAACP Image Awards	2021	Outstanding Music Video/Visual Album	"Brown Skin Girl" (with Blue Ivy Carter, Saint Jhn and Wizkid)	Won	
NAACP Image Awards	2021	Outstanding Soul/R&B Song	"Black Parade"	Nominated	
NAACP Image Awards	2021	Outstanding Hip Hop/Rap Song	"Savage (Remix)" (Megan Thee Stallion featuring Beyoncé)	Won	
NAACP Image Awards	2021	Outstanding Duo, Group or Collaboration (Contemporary)	"Savage (Remix)" (Megan Thee Stallion featuring Beyoncé)	Won	
NAACP Image Awards	2022	Outstanding Female Artist	Beyoncé	Nominated	
NAACP Image Awards	2022	Outstanding Soul/R&B Song	"Be Alive"	Nominated	
NAACP Image Awards	2023	Outstanding Female Artist	Beyoncé	Won	
NAACP Image Awards	2023	Outstanding Album	Renaissance	Won	
NAACP Image Awards	2023	Outstanding Soul/R&B Song	"Cuff It"	Won	
NAACP Image Awards	2023	Outstanding Duo, Group or Collaboration (Contemporary)	"Move" (with Grace Jones and Tems)	Nominated	
NAACP Image Awards	2023	Outstanding Music Video/Visual Album	"Be Alive"	Nominated	
NAACP Image Awards	2025	Outstanding Female Artist	Beyoncé	Won	
NAACP Image Awards	2025	Outstanding Album	Cowboy Carter	Won	
NAACP Image Awards	2025	Outstanding Soul/R&B Song	"16 Carriages"	Nominated	
NAMIC Vision Award (Note: The National Association for Multi-ethnicity in Communications (NAMIC), the premier organization focusing on cultural diversity, equity, and inclusion in the media and entertainment industry.)	2017	Variety/Talk Show	Lemonade	Won	
Napster Awards	2014	Artist of the Year	Beyoncé	Won	
National Film Awards UK	2019	Best Performance in an Animated Movie	The Lion King	Won	
National Film Awards UK	2019	Best Documentary	Homecoming: A Film by Beyoncé	Nominated	
New Jersey Packaging Executives’ (NJPEC's) Package of the Year Awards	2011	Fragrance: Bronze & Luxury Awards	Heat	Won	
New Jersey Packaging Executives’ (NJPEC's) Package of the Year Awards	2012	Fragrance: Silver Award	Pulse	Won	
New Music Awards	2023	TOP40 Female Artist of the Year	Beyoncé	Won	
New York Association of Black Journalists	2012	Arts & Entertainment Magazine Category	Beyoncé in Essence	Gold	
New York Music Awards	2011	Best Pop Collaboration	"Telephone" (Lady Gaga featuring Beyoncé)	Won	
New York Music Awards	2011	Best Pop Video	"Telephone" (Lady Gaga featuring Beyoncé)	Won	
Nickelodeon Kids' Choice Awards	2003	Favorite Female Butt Kicker	Austin Powers in Goldmember	Nominated	
Nickelodeon Kids' Choice Awards	2004	Favorite Female Singer	Beyoncé	Nominated	
Nickelodeon Kids' Choice Awards	2004	Favorite Song	"Crazy in Love" (featuring Jay-Z)	Nominated	
Nickelodeon Kids' Choice Awards	2005	Favorite Female Singer	Beyoncé	Nominated	
Nickelodeon Kids' Choice Awards	2007	Favorite Female Singer	Beyoncé	Won	
Nickelodeon Kids' Choice Awards	2007	Favorite Song	"Irreplaceable"	Won	
Nickelodeon Kids' Choice Awards	2008	Favorite Female Singer	Beyoncé	Nominated	
Nickelodeon Kids' Choice Awards	2009	Favorite Song	"Single Ladies (Put a Ring on It)"	Won	
Nickelodeon Kids' Choice Awards	2009	Favorite Female Singer	Beyoncé	Nominated	
Nickelodeon Kids' Choice Awards	2010	Favorite Female Singer	Beyoncé	Nominated	
Nickelodeon Kids' Choice Awards	2015	Favorite Female Singer	Beyoncé	Nominated	
Nickelodeon Kids' Choice Awards	2017	Best Music Video	"Formation"	Nominated	
Nickelodeon Kids' Choice Awards	2017	Favorite Female Singer	Beyoncé	Nominated	
Nickelodeon Kids' Choice Awards	2018	Favorite Female Singer	Beyoncé	Nominated	
Nickelodeon Kids' Choice Awards	2019	Favorite Female Singer	Beyoncé	Nominated	
Nickelodeon Kids' Choice Awards	2020	Favorite Female Singer	Beyoncé	Nominated	
Nickelodeon Kids' Choice Awards	2020	Favorite Female Voice from an Animated Movie	The Lion King	Won	
Nickelodeon Kids' Choice Awards	2021	Favorite Female Singer	Beyoncé	Nominated	
Nickelodeon Kids' Choice Awards	2023	Favorite Female Singer	Beyoncé	Nominated	
Nickelodeon Kids' Choice Awards	2023	Favorite Song	"Break My Soul"	Nominated	
Nickelodeon Kids' Choice Awards	2023	Favorite Album	Renaissance	Nominated	
Nickelodeon Australian Kids' Choice Awards	2010	Favorite Song	"Telephone" (Lady Gaga featuring Beyoncé)	Nominated	
Nickelodeon Kids' Choice Awards Brazil	2016	Girl Power	Beyoncé	Won	
Nickelodeon UK Kids' Choice Awards	2007	Best Music Video	"Listen"	Nominated	
NME Awards	2010	Hero of the Year	Beyoncé	Nominated	
NME Awards	2012	Best Video	"Countdown"	Nominated	
NME Awards	2017	Best Album	Lemonade	Nominated	
NME Awards	2017	Music Moment of the Year	Lemonade	Nominated	
NME Awards	2017	Best Video	"Formation"	Nominated	
NME Awards	2017	Best International Female	Beyoncé	Nominated	
NME Awards	2017	Hero of the Year	Beyoncé	Won	
NME Awards	2020	Best Music Film	Homecoming: A Film by Beyoncé	Nominated	
Norwegian Cosmetic Award	2011	Best Lifestyle Fragrance	Heat	Won	
NRJ Radio Music Awards	2004	International Female Artist of the Year	Beyoncé	Won	
NRJ Radio Music Awards	2004	Best R&B	Beyoncé	Won	
NRJ Music Awards	2007	Best Song in a Film	"Listen"	Nominated	
NRJ Music Awards	2010	NRJ Award of Honor	Beyoncé	Won	
NRJ Music Awards	2010	International Album of the Year	I Am... Sasha Fierce	Nominated	
NRJ Music Awards	2011	Music Video of the Year	"Telephone" (Lady Gaga featuring Beyoncé)	Won	
NRJ Music Awards	2011	International Collaboration of the Year	"Telephone" (Lady Gaga featuring Beyoncé)	Nominated	
NRJ Music Awards	2012	International Female Artist of the Year	Beyoncé	Nominated	
NRJ Music Awards	2014	International Female Artist of the Year	Beyoncé	Nominated	
NRJ Music Awards	2016	International Female Artist of the Year	Beyoncé	Nominated	
The One Show Awards	2014	Young Guns	Beyoncé's Vogue Motion Cover	Gold	
The One Show Awards	2017	Cultural Driver Award	"Formation"	Gold	
The One Show Awards	2017	Best Music Video	"Formation"	Gold	
The One Show Awards	2025	Artist / Brand Collaboration	Verizon "Can't B Broken" Commercial	Merit	
The One Show Awards	2025	Branded Entertainment	Verizon "Can't B Broken" Commercial	Merit	
The One Show Awards	2025	Innovation / Use of Media in Direct Marketing	Verizon "Can't B Broken" Commercial	Merit	
The One Show Awards	2025	Direct Marketing	Verizon "Can't B Broken" Commercial	Merit	
The One Show Awards	2025	Creative Effectiveness / Technology Software - Internet / Telecommunications/ Software & Apps	Verizon "Can't B Broken" Commercial	Merit	
Online Film Critics Society	2020	Best Non-Theatrical Releases	Homecoming: A Film by Beyoncé	Won	
Outstanding Merchandising Achievement Awards	2011	Display of the Year	Heat	Bronze	
People's Choice Awards	2004	Favorite Female Performer	Beyoncé	Won	
People's Choice Awards	2008	Favorite Female Singer	Beyoncé	Nominated	
People's Choice Awards	2008	Favorite Pop Song	"Irreplaceable"	Nominated	
People's Choice Awards	2008	Favorite R&B Song	"Beautiful Liar" (with Shakira)	Nominated	
People's Choice Awards	2009	Favorite Star Under 35	Beyoncé	Nominated	
People's Choice Awards	2010	Favorite Female Artist	Beyoncé	Nominated	
People's Choice Awards	2010	Favorite R&B Artist	Beyoncé	Nominated	
People's Choice Awards	2011	Favorite R&B Artist	Beyoncé	Nominated	
People's Choice Awards	2011	Favorite Pop Artist	Beyoncé	Nominated	
People's Choice Awards	2011	Favorite Music Video	"Telephone" (Lady Gaga featuring Beyoncé)	Nominated	
People's Choice Awards	2011	Favorite Song	"Telephone" (Lady Gaga featuring Beyoncé)	Nominated	
People's Choice Awards	2012	Favorite Female Artist	Beyoncé	Nominated	
People's Choice Awards	2012	Favorite Pop Artist	Beyoncé	Nominated	
People's Choice Awards	2012	Favorite R&B Artist	Beyoncé	Nominated	
People's Choice Awards	2012	Favorite Album of the Year	4	Nominated	
People's Choice Awards	2012	Favorite Music Video	"Run the World (Girls)"	Nominated	
People's Choice Awards	2013	Favorite R&B Artist	Beyoncé	Nominated	
People's Choice Awards	2015	Favorite Female Artist	Beyoncé	Nominated	
People's Choice Awards	2015	Favorite Pop Artist	Beyoncé	Nominated	
People's Choice Awards	2016	Favorite Social Media Celebrity	Beyoncé	Nominated	
People's Choice Awards	2017	Favorite Female Artist	Beyoncé	Nominated	
People's Choice Awards	2017	Favorite R&B Artist	Beyoncé	Nominated	
People's Choice Awards	2017	Favorite Album	Lemonade	Nominated	
People's Choice Awards	2018	Favorite Female Artist	Beyoncé	Nominated	
People's Choice Awards	2018	Style Icon	Beyoncé	Nominated	
People's Choice Awards	2018	Concert of the Year	On the Run II Tour (with Jay-Z)	Nominated	
People's Choice Awards	2019	Animated Movie Star	Beyoncé	Won	
People's Choice Awards	2020	Collaboration of the Year	"Savage (Remix)" (Megan Thee Stallion featuring Beyoncé)	Nominated	
People's Choice Awards	2022	The Female Artist of 2022	Beyoncé	Nominated	
People's Choice Awards	2022	The Song of 2022	"Break My Soul"	Nominated	
People's Choice Awards	2022	The Album of 2022	Renaissance	Nominated	
People's Choice Awards	2024	The Female Artist of the Year	Beyoncé	Nominated	
People's Choice Awards	2024	The R&B Artist of the Year	Beyoncé	Won	
People's Choice Awards	2024	The Concert Tour of the Year	Renaissance World Tour	Nominated	
People's Choice Country Awards	2024	The People's Artist of 2024	Beyoncé	Nominated	
People's Choice Country Awards	2024	The Female Artist of 2024	Beyoncé	Nominated	
People's Choice Country Awards	2024	The Social Country Star of 2024	Beyoncé	Nominated	
People's Choice Country Awards	2024	The Song of 2024	"Texas Hold 'Em"	Nominated	
People's Choice Country Awards	2024	The Female Song of 2024	"Texas Hold 'Em"	Nominated	
People's Choice Country Awards	2024	The Female Song of 2024	"16 Carriages"	Nominated	
People's Choice Country Awards	2024	The Storyteller Song of 2024	"16 Carriages"	Nominated	
People's Choice Country Awards	2024	The Crossover Song of 2024	"II Most Wanted" (with Miley Cyrus)	Nominated	
People's Choice Country Awards	2024	The Collaboration Song of 2024	"Blackbiird" (with Brittney Spencer, Reyna Roberts, Tanner Adell and Tiera Kennedy)	Nominated	
People's Choice Country Awards	2024	The Cover Song of 2024	"Blackbiird" (with Brittney Spencer, Reyna Roberts, Tanner Adell and Tiera Kennedy)	Nominated	
People's Choice Country Awards	2024	The Cover Song of 2024	"Jolene"	Nominated	
People's Choice Country Awards	2024	The Album of 2024	Cowboy Carter	Nominated	
People en Español Awards	2008	Best Song	"Beautiful Liar" (with Shakira)	Won	
Pewter Awards	2011	Packaging Rigid	Heat	Won	
Planeta Awards	2018	Best Ballad or Mid-Tempo	"Perfect Duet" (with Ed Sheeran)	Won	
Pollstar Awards	2015	Major Tour of the Year	On the Run Tour (with Jay-Z)	Nominated	
Pollstar Awards	2017	Major Tour of the Year	The Formation World Tour	Nominated	
Pollstar Awards	2017	Most Creative Stage Production	The Formation World Tour	Won	
Pollstar Awards	2019	Best Hip-Hop/R&B Tour	On the Run II Tour (with Jay-Z)	Won	
Pollstar Awards	2019	Major Tour of the Year	On the Run II Tour (with Jay-Z)	Nominated	
Pollstar Awards	2021	Touring Artist of the Decade	Beyoncé	Won	
Pollstar Awards	2021	Hip-Hop/R&B Touring Artist of the Decade	Beyoncé	Nominated	
Pollstar Awards	2024	Major Tour of the Year	Renaissance World Tour	Nominated	
Pollstar Awards	2024	R&B Tour of the Year	Renaissance World Tour	Won	
Pollstar Awards	2024	Pop Tour of the Year	Renaissance World Tour	Nominated	
Pollstar Awards	2026	Major Tour of the Year	Cowboy Carter Tour	Nominated	
Pollstar Awards	2026	Country Tour of the Year	Cowboy Carter Tour	Nominated	
Pollstar Awards	2026	Fan Favorite Live Performer of the Year	Cowboy Carter Tour	Nominated	
Porin Awards	2004	Best Foreign Song	"Crazy in Love" (featuring Jay-Z)	Won	
Porin Awards	2010	Best Foreign Song	"Halo"	Won	
Pop Awards	2019	Artist of the Year	The Carters	Won	
PopSugar Beauty Awards	2013	Beauty Trendsetter Award	Beyoncé	Won	
Premios Amigo	2004	Best International Album	Dangerously in Love	Won	
Premios Amigo	2007	Song of the Year	"Amor Gitano" (with Alejandro Fernández)	Won	
Premios Amigo	2007	Vodafone Award for the Most Downloaded Tone	"Amor Gitano" (with Alejandro Fernández)	Won	
Prêmio de Música Digital	2010	Top-selling Song in Brazil	"Halo"	Won	
Prêmio de Música Digital	2010	International Top-selling Song	"Halo"	Won	
Premios Juventud	2015	Favorite Hitmaker	Beyoncé	Won	
Premios Oye!	2007	International Album of the Year	B'Day	Won	
Premios Oye!	2009	Album of the Year	I Am... Sasha Fierce	Nominated	
Premios Oye!	2009	Record of the Year	"Single Ladies (Put a Ring on It)"	Nominated	
Q Awards	2011	Best Female Artist	Beyoncé	Nominated	
Q Awards	2011	Best Live Act	Beyoncé	Nominated	
Q Awards	2016	Best Video	"Formation"	Nominated	
Queerties Awards	2023	Anthem	"Cozy" (featuring Honey Dijon and Ts Madison)	Runner-up	
QX Gaygalan Awards	2011	Best Foreign Hit	"Telephone" (Lady Gaga featuring Beyoncé)	Won	
Radio Music Award	2004	Artist of the Year – Top 40 Pop Radio	Beyoncé	Won	
The Record of the Year	2003	Record of the Year	"Crazy in Love" (featuring Jay-Z)	Won	
The Record of the Year	2007	Record of the Year	"Beautiful Liar" (with Shakira)	Won	
The Record of the Year	2010	Record of the Year	"Video Phone" (featuring Lady Gaga)	Won	
Rockbjörnen	2018	Live Concert of the Year	Beyoncé	Nominated	
Rockbjörnen	2021	Foreign Song of the Year	"Savage (Remix)" (Megan Thee Stallion featuring Beyoncé)	Nominated	
Rockbjörnen	2024	Foreign Song of the Year	"Texas Hold 'Em"	Won	
RTHK International Pop Poll Awards	2002	Top Ten International Gold Songs	"Survivor"	Gold	
RTHK International Pop Poll Awards	2004	Top Ten International Gold Songs	"Crazy in Love" (featuring Jay-Z)	Gold	
RTHK International Pop Poll Awards	2004	Top Female Artist	Beyoncé	Bronze	
RTHK International Pop Poll Awards	2005	Top Ten International Gold Songs	"Lose My Breath"	Gold	
RTHK International Pop Poll Awards	2005	Top Ten International Gold Songs	"Naughty Girl"	Nominated	
RTHK International Pop Poll Awards	2005	Top Female Artist	Beyoncé	Nominated	
RTHK International Pop Poll Awards	2007	Top Ten International Gold Songs	"Déjà Vu" (featuring Jay-Z)	Gold	
RTHK International Pop Poll Awards	2007	Top Female Artist	Beyoncé	Bronze	
RTHK International Pop Poll Awards	2008	Top Ten International Gold Songs	"Listen"	Gold	
RTHK International Pop Poll Awards	2008	Top Female Artist	Beyoncé	Gold	
RTHK International Pop Poll Awards	2009	Top Ten International Gold Songs	"If I Were a Boy"	Gold	
RTHK International Pop Poll Awards	2009	Super Gold Songs	"If I Were a Boy"	Gold	
RTHK International Pop Poll Awards	2009	Top Female Artist	Beyoncé	Gold	
RTHK International Pop Poll Awards	2010	Top Ten International Gold Songs	"Sweet Dreams"	Gold	
RTHK International Pop Poll Awards	2010	Top Female Artist	Beyoncé	Bronze	
RTHK International Pop Poll Awards	2011	Top Ten International Gold Songs	"Telephone" (Lady Gaga featuring Beyoncé)	Gold	
RTHK International Pop Poll Awards	2011	Super Gold Songs	"Telephone" (Lady Gaga featuring Beyoncé)	Gold	
RTHK International Pop Poll Awards	2012	Top Ten International Gold Songs	"Run the World (Girls)"	Gold	
RTHK International Pop Poll Awards	2012	Top Female Artist	Beyoncé	Bronze	
RTHK International Pop Poll Awards	2014	Top Female Artist	Beyoncé	Bronze	
RTHK International Pop Poll Awards	2017	Top Ten International Gold Songs	"Sorry"	Nominated	
RTHK International Pop Poll Awards	2017	Top Ten International Gold Songs	"Hymn for the Weekend" (Coldplay featuring Beyoncé)	Gold	
RTHK International Pop Poll Awards	2017	Top Female Artist	Beyoncé	Gold	
Sammy Davis Jr. Awards	1989	Baby Junior Award	Beyoncé	Won	
Satellite Awards	2003	Best Original Song	"Work It Out"	Nominated	
Satellite Awards	2006	Best Actress – Motion Picture Musical or Comedy	Dreamgirls	Nominated	
Satellite Awards	2006	Best Original Song	"Listen"	Nominated	
Satellite Awards	2008	Best Supporting Actress – Musical or Comedy	Cadillac Records	Nominated	
Satellite Awards	2019	Best Original Song	"Spirit" (from The Lion King)	Nominated	
Satellite Awards	2021	Best Original Song	"Be Alive"	Nominated	
Self Awards	2010	Women Doing Good Award	Beyoncé	Won	
Self Fragrance Awards	2011	Best A-List-Celebrity Scent	Pulse	Won	
SELF Healthy Beauty Awards	2024	Best Shampoo for Curly Hair	Cécred Hydrating Shampoo	Won	
SELF Healthy Beauty Awards	2024	Best Deep Conditioner	Cécred Moisturising Deep Conditioner	Won	
Seventeen Magazine Style Awards	2008	Style Star of the Year	Beyoncé	Won	
Shorty Awards	2017	Instagram Picture of the Year	Beyoncé & Blue Ivy Carter	Nominated	
Shorty Awards	2017	Gif of the Year	Lemonade	Nominated	
Shorty Awards	2018	Instagram of the Year	Beyoncé's Birth Announcement	Nominated	
Shorty Awards	2020	Celebrity–Arts & Entertainment	Beyoncé	Nominated	
Shorty Awards	2020	Instagram Content of the Year	Beyoncé	Nominated	
Silver Clef Award	2017	Best Live Act	Beyoncé	Nominated	
SIP Awards	2023	Platinum	SirDavis	Won	
SIP Awards	2023	American Rye Best in Class	SirDavis	Won	
Smash Hits Poll Winners Party	2003	Best Music Video	"Crazy in Love" (featuring Jay-Z)	Won	
Smash Hits Poll Winners Party	2003	Most Fanciable Female on the Planet	Beyoncé	Won	
Smash Hits Poll Winners Party	2005	Most Fanciable Female on the Planet	Beyoncé	Nominated	
Space Shower Music Awards	2004	Best International Video	"Crazy in Love" (featuring Jay-Z)	Won	
Space Shower Music Awards	2004	Best International Female Video	"Crazy in Love" (featuring Jay-Z)	Won	
Space Shower Music Awards	2017	Best International Artist	Beyoncé	Nominated	
Spin Awards	2004	Sex Goddess	Beyoncé	Won	
Splash Awards	2023	Best International Male or Female Singer	Beyoncé	Won	
Soul Train Music Awards	2004	Album of the Year	Dangerously in Love	Nominated	
Soul Train Music Awards	2004	Best R&B/Soul Album – Female	Dangerously in Love	Won	
Soul Train Music Awards	2004	Best R&B/Soul Single – Female	"Crazy in Love" (featuring Jay-Z)	Nominated	
Soul Train Music Awards	2004	Best R&B/Soul or Rap Music Video	"Crazy in Love" (featuring Jay-Z)	Nominated	
Soul Train Music Awards	2004	Sammy Davis Jr. Award for Entertainer of the Year	Beyoncé	Won	
Soul Train Music Awards	2005	Best R&B/Soul Single – Female	"Naughty Girl"	Nominated	
Soul Train Music Awards	2005	Best R&B/Soul Single – Group, Band or Duo	"The Closer I Get to You" (with Luther Vandross)	Nominated	
Soul Train Music Awards	2007	Best R&B/Soul Album – Female	B'Day	Nominated	
Soul Train Music Awards	2007	Best R&B/Soul Single – Female	"Irreplaceable"	Won	
Soul Train Music Awards	2007	Best R&B/Soul or Rap Music Video	"Irreplaceable"	Nominated	
Soul Train Music Awards	2009	Album of the Year	I Am... Sasha Fierce	Won	
Soul Train Music Awards	2009	The Ashford & Simpson Songwriter's Award	"Single Ladies (Put a Ring on It)"	Nominated	
Soul Train Music Awards	2009	Song of the Year	"Single Ladies (Put a Ring on It)"	Won	
Soul Train Music Awards	2009	Best R&B/Soul Female Artist	Beyoncé	Won	
Soul Train Music Awards	2011	Album of the Year	4	Nominated	
Soul Train Music Awards	2011	The Ashford & Simpson Songwriter's Award	"Best Thing I Never Had"	Nominated	
Soul Train Music Awards	2011	Best Dance Performance	"Run the World (Girls)"	Won	
Soul Train Music Awards	2011	Best R&B/Soul Female Artist	Beyoncé	Nominated	
Soul Train Music Awards	2012	Best R&B/Soul Female Artist	Beyoncé	Won	
Soul Train Music Awards	2012	Best Dance Performance	"Love On Top"	Won	
Soul Train Music Awards	2014	Album of the Year	Beyoncé	Won	
Soul Train Music Awards	2014	Song of the Year	"Drunk in Love" (featuring Jay-Z)	Nominated	
Soul Train Music Awards	2014	Video of the Year	"Drunk in Love" (featuring Jay-Z)	Nominated	
Soul Train Music Awards	2014	The Ashford & Simpson Songwriter's Award	"Pretty Hurts"	Nominated	
Soul Train Music Awards	2014	Best Gospel/Inspirational Song	"Say Yes" (Michelle Williams featuring Beyoncé and Kelly Rowland)	Nominated	
Soul Train Music Awards	2014	Best R&B/Soul Female Artist	Beyoncé	Won	
Soul Train Music Awards	2015	Video of the Year	"7/11"	Nominated	
Soul Train Music Awards	2015	Best Dance Performance	"7/11"	Nominated	
Soul Train Music Awards	2015	Best Collaboration	"Feeling Myself" (Nicki Minaj featuring Beyoncé)	Nominated	
Soul Train Music Awards	2015	Best R&B/Soul Female Artist	Beyoncé	Nominated	
Soul Train Music Awards	2016	Album of the Year	Lemonade	Won	
Soul Train Music Awards	2016	Video of the Year	"Sorry"	Nominated	
Soul Train Music Awards	2016	Video of the Year	"Formation"	Won	
Soul Train Music Awards	2016	Song of the Year	"Formation"	Won	
Soul Train Music Awards	2016	Best Dance Performance	"Formation"	Nominated	
Soul Train Music Awards	2016	The Ashford & Simpson Songwriter's Award	"Formation"	Nominated	
Soul Train Music Awards	2016	Best Collaboration	"Freedom" (featuring Kendrick Lamar)	Nominated	
Soul Train Music Awards	2016	Best R&B/Soul Female Artist	Beyoncé	Won	
Soul Train Music Awards	2017	Video of the Year	"All Night"	Nominated	
Soul Train Music Awards	2019	Best R&B/Soul Female Artist	Beyoncé	Nominated	
Soul Train Music Awards	2019	Song of the Year	"Before I Let Go"	Nominated	
Soul Train Music Awards	2019	Video of the Year	"Spirit" (from The Lion King)	Nominated	
Soul Train Music Awards	2019	Best Dance Performance	"Spirit" (from The Lion King)	Nominated	
Soul Train Music Awards	2019	Best Collaboration	"Brown Skin Girl" (with Blue Ivy Carter, Saint Jhn and Wizkid)	Nominated	
Soul Train Music Awards	2019	The Ashford & Simpson Songwriter's Award	"Brown Skin Girl" (with Blue Ivy Carter, Saint Jhn and Wizkid)	Won	
Soul Train Music Awards	2020	Best R&B/Soul Female Artist	Beyoncé	Nominated	
Soul Train Music Awards	2020	Song of the Year	"Black Parade"	Nominated	
Soul Train Music Awards	2020	The Ashford & Simpson Songwriter's Award	"Black Parade"	Nominated	
Soul Train Music Awards	2020	The Ashford & Simpson Songwriter's Award	"Playing Games" (Summer Walker featuring Bryson Tiller)	Nominated	
Soul Train Music Awards	2020	Video of the Year	"Brown Skin Girl" (with Blue Ivy Carter, Saint Jhn and Wizkid)	Won	
Soul Train Music Awards	2020	Best Dance Performance	"Already" (with Shatta Wale and Major Lazer)	Nominated	
Soul Train Music Awards	2022	Best R&B/Soul Female Artist	Beyoncé	Nominated	
Soul Train Music Awards	2022	Album of the Year	Renaissance	Won	
Soul Train Music Awards	2022	Song of the Year	"Break My Soul"	Won	
Soul Train Music Awards	2022	The Ashford & Simpson Songwriter's Award	"Break My Soul"	Nominated	
Soul Train Music Awards	2022	The Ashford & Simpson Songwriter's Award	"Church Girl"	Nominated	
Soul Train Music Awards	2022	Best Collaboration	"Move" (with Grace Jones and Tems)	Nominated	
Soul Train Music Awards	2022	Best Collaboration	"Make Me Say It Again, Girl" (Ronald Isley & The Isley Brothers featuring Beyoncé)	Won	
Stellar Awards	2015	Song of the Year	"Say Yes" (Michelle Williams featuring Beyoncé and Kelly Rowland)	Nominated	
Stellar Awards	2015	Music Video of the Year	"Say Yes" (Michelle Williams featuring Beyoncé and Kelly Rowland)	Won	
Stellar Awards	2015	Urban/Inspirational Single or Performance of the Year	"Say Yes" (Michelle Williams featuring Beyoncé and Kelly Rowland)	Nominated	
Tatler Beauty Awards	2024	Best In Hair : Best For Hydration	Cécred Hydrating Shampoo	Won	
Teen Choice Awards	2002	Choice Female Hottie	Beyoncé	Nominated	
Teen Choice Awards	2003	Choice Female Hottie	Beyoncé	Won	
Teen Choice Awards	2003	Choice Music – Female Artist	Beyoncé	Nominated	
Teen Choice Awards	2003	Choice Breakout Music Artist	Beyoncé	Nominated	
Teen Choice Awards	2003	Choice Crossover Artist	Beyoncé	Nominated	
Teen Choice Awards	2003	Choice Female Fashion Icon	Beyoncé	Nominated	
Teen Choice Awards	2003	Choice Breakout Movie Actor	Austin Powers in Goldmember	Nominated	
Teen Choice Awards	2003	Choice Music – Love Song	"Crazy in Love" (featuring Jay-Z)	Won	
Teen Choice Awards	2003	Choice Summer Song	"Crazy in Love" (featuring Jay-Z)	Won	
Teen Choice Awards	2003	Choice Music – Collaboration	"'03 Bonnie & Clyde" (Jay-Z featuring Beyoncé)	Nominated	
Teen Choice Awards	2004	Choice Female Hottie	Beyoncé	Nominated	
Teen Choice Awards	2004	Choice Music – Female Artist	Beyoncé	Nominated	
Teen Choice Awards	2004	Choice Music – R&B Artist	Beyoncé	Nominated	
Teen Choice Awards	2004	Choice Music – Tour (Note: Shared with Missy Elliott and Alicia Keys.)	Beyoncé	Nominated	
Teen Choice Awards	2004	Choice Music – Single	"Baby Boy" (featuring Sean Paul)	Nominated	
Teen Choice Awards	2004	Choice Music – Collaboration	"Baby Boy" (featuring Sean Paul)	Nominated	
Teen Choice Awards	2004	Choice Music – R&B Track	"Naughty Girl"	Nominated	
Teen Choice Awards	2004	Choice Music – Album	Dangerously in Love	Nominated	
Teen Choice Awards	2005	Choice Music – Love Song	"Cater 2 U"	Nominated	
Teen Choice Awards	2005	Choice Music – R&B Track	"Soldier" (featuring T.I. and Lil Wayne)	Nominated	
Teen Choice Awards	2005	Choice Female Hottie	Beyoncé	Nominated	
Teen Choice Awards	2006	Choice Red Carpet Fashion Icon – Female	Beyoncé	Nominated	
Teen Choice Awards	2006	Choice Music – R&B/Hip-Hop Track	"Check on It" (featuring Bun B and Slim Thug)	Nominated	
Teen Choice Awards	2007	Choice Music – R&B Artist	Beyoncé	Nominated	
Teen Choice Awards	2007	Choice Movie – Liplock	Dreamgirls (Note: Shared with Jamie Foxx.)	Nominated	
Teen Choice Awards	2007	Choice Music – Payback Track	"Irreplaceable"	Nominated	
Teen Choice Awards	2008	Choice Music – R&B Artist	Beyoncé	Nominated	
Teen Choice Awards	2009	Choice Movie Actress – Drama	Obsessed	Nominated	
Teen Choice Awards	2009	Choice Movie – Rumble (Note: Shared with Ali Larter.)	Obsessed	Nominated	
Teen Choice Awards	2009	Choice Music – R&B Artist	Beyoncé	Won	
Teen Choice Awards	2009	Choice Female Hottie	Beyoncé	Nominated	
Teen Choice Awards	2009	Choice Music – R&B Track	"Single Ladies (Put a Ring on It)"	Won	
Teen Choice Awards	2009	Choice Music – Love Song	"Halo"	Nominated	
Teen Choice Awards	2009	Choice Music Album – Female	I Am... Sasha Fierce	Nominated	
Teen Choice Awards	2010	Choice Music – R&B Artist	Beyoncé	Won	
Teen Choice Awards	2010	Choice Music – Collaboration	"Telephone" (Lady Gaga featuring Beyoncé)	Nominated	
Teen Choice Awards	2011	Choice Music – R&B/Hip-Hop Track	"Run the World (Girls)"	Won	
Teen Choice Awards	2011	Choice Summer Music Star – Female	Beyoncé	Nominated	
Teen Choice Awards	2012	Choice Music – R&B/Hip-Hop Track	"Run the World (Girls)"	Nominated	
Teen Choice Awards	2012	Choice R&B/Hip-Hop Song	"Love On Top"	Nominated	
Teen Choice Awards	2013	Choice Music – R&B Artist	Beyoncé	Nominated	
Teen Choice Awards	2013	Choice Summer Tour	The Mrs. Carter Show World Tour	Nominated	
Teen Choice Awards	2014	Choice Summer Tour	On the Run Tour (with Jay-Z)	Nominated	
Teen Choice Awards	2014	Choice Music – Female Artist	Beyoncé	Nominated	
Teen Choice Awards	2014	Choice Female Hottie	Beyoncé	Nominated	
Teen Choice Awards	2015	Choice Instagrammer	Beyoncé	Nominated	
Teen Choice Awards	2016	Choice Music – Female Artist	Beyoncé	Nominated	
Teen Choice Awards	2016	Choice Music – R&B/Hip-Hop Artist	Beyoncé	Won	
Teen Choice Awards	2017	Choice Instagrammer	Beyoncé	Nominated	
Teen Choice Awards	2017	Choice Music – R&B/Hip-Hop Artist	Beyoncé	Won	
Teen Choice Awards	2018	Choice Summer Tour	On the Run II Tour (with Jay-Z)	Nominated	
Teen Vogue Beauty Awards	2011	Best Body Image	Beyoncé	Won	
Telecom New Zealand Awards	2005	Gold Award	"Naughty Girl"	Gold	
Telehit Awards	2010	Video of the Year	"Telephone" (Lady Gaga featuring Beyoncé)	Won	
Ticketmaster Awards	2019	Touring Milestone Award	On the Run II Tour (with Jay-Z)	Won	
TMF Awards	2009	Best Live	Beyoncé	Won	
Top of the Pops Awards	2003	Album of the Year	Dangerously in Love	Won	
Top of the Pops Awards	2003	Most Gorgeous Girl	Beyoncé	Won	
Trumpet Awards	2005	APEX Award	Beyoncé	Won	
UB Honors	2004	Best Dressed Female	Beyoncé	Won	
UB Honors	2009	Best Female R&B Artist	Beyoncé	Won	
UB Honors	2011	Best Female R&B Artist	Beyoncé	Won	
UB Honors	2012	Most Anticipated Album of 2013	Beyoncé	Won	
UB Honors	2019	Artist of the Decade	Beyoncé	Won	
UB Honors	2019	R&B Album of the Decade	Lemonade	Won	
UB Honors	2020	Best Dance/Club Single of The Year	"Black Parade"	Won	
UB Honors	2022	Artist of the Year	Beyoncé	Won	
UB Honors	2022	Hustler of the Year	Beyoncé	Won	
UB Honors	2022	Best Female R&B Artist	Beyoncé	Won	
UB Honors	2022	Best R&B Album of The Year	Renaissance	Won	
UB Honors	2022	Best R&B Single of The Year	"Cuff It"	Won	
UB Honors	2022	Best Dance/Club Single of The Year	"Break My Soul"	Won	
UB Honors	2023	Artist of the Year	Beyoncé	Won	
UB Honors	2023	Best R&B/Single of The Year	"Cuff It"	Won	
UB Honors	2023	Best Female R&B Artist	Beyoncé	Won	
UB Honors	2023	Hottest Collaboration Single of The Year	"America Has a Problem" (featuring Kendrick Lamar)	Won	
UB Honors	2023	Best Mid-tempo Single of The Year	"Cuff It"	Won	
UK Music Video Awards	2009	Best Pop Video	"Single Ladies (Put a Ring on It)"	Nominated	
UK Music Video Awards	2009	Best International Video	"Diva"	Nominated	
UK Music Video Awards	2010	Best International Video	"Telephone" (Lady Gaga featuring Beyoncé)	Nominated	
UK Music Video Awards	2015	Best UK Pop Video	"Runnin' (Lose It All)" (Naughty Boy featuring Beyoncé and Arrow Benjamin)	Nominated	
UK Music Video Awards	2016	Best Urban Video – International	"Formation"	Nominated	
UK Music Video Awards	2016	Best Styling in a Video	"Formation"	Won	
UK Music Video Awards	2016	Best Video Artist	Beyoncé	Nominated	
UK Music Video Awards	2020	Best Music Film	Black Is King	Nominated	
UK Music Video Awards	2020	Best R&B/Soul Video – International	"Already" (with Shatta Wale and Major Lazer)	Nominated	
UK Music Video Awards	2020	Best Styling in a Video	"Already" (with Shatta Wale and Major Lazer)	Won	
UK Music Video Awards	2020	Best Choreography in a Video	"Already" (with Shatta Wale and Major Lazer)	Nominated	
UK Music Video Awards	2021	Best R&B/Soul Video – International	"Brown Skin Girl" (with Blue Ivy Carter, Saint Jhn and Wizkid)	Nominated	
UK Music Video Awards	2021	Best Wardrobe Styling in a Video	"Brown Skin Girl" (with Blue Ivy Carter, Saint Jhn and Wizkid)	Nominated	
Ultimate Spirits Challenge	2023	Spirits Challenge NY International	SirDavis	Gold	
Urban Music Awards	2009	Best Single	"Halo"	Nominated	
Urban Music Awards	2009	Best International Act	Beyoncé	Nominated	
Urban Music Awards	2016	Best International Act	Beyoncé	Nominated	
Urban Music Awards	2021	Best Female Act	Beyoncé	Nominated	
Urban Music Awards	2021	Best Single	"Already" (with Shatta Wale and Major Lazer)	Nominated	
Urban Music Awards	2021	Best Collaboration	"Already" (with Shatta Wale and Major Lazer)	Won	
Urban Music Awards	2023	Artist of the Year (USA)	Beyoncé	Nominated	
Urban Music Awards	2023	Best Album	Renaissance	Nominated	
VH1 Big Awards	2003	BIG Entertainer	Beyoncé	Won	
VH1 Big Awards	2006	BIG Power Couple	Beyoncé & Jay-Z	Won	
Vibe Awards	2003	Artist of the Year	Beyoncé	Nominated	
Vibe Awards	2003	Most Stylish Artist	Beyoncé	Won	
Vibe Awards	2003	Coolest Collaboration	"Crazy in Love" (featuring Jay-Z)	Won	
Vibe Awards	2003	Reelest Video	"Crazy in Love" (featuring Jay-Z)	Nominated	
Vibe Awards	2004	Best R&B Video	"Me, Myself and I"	Nominated	
Vibe Awards	2004	Reelest Video	"Me, Myself and I"	Nominated	
Vibe Awards	2007	R&B Artist of the Year	Beyoncé	Won	
Vibe Awards	2007	VStyle	Beyoncé	Won	
Vibe Awards	2007	Song of the Year	"Irreplaceable"	Nominated	
Vibe Awards	2007	Video of the Year	"Get Me Bodied"	Nominated	
Vibe of the Year Awards	2003	Best Diva	Beyoncé	Won	
Vibe of the Year Awards	2003	Best Couple	Beyoncé & Jay-Z	Won	
The Village Voice Web Awards	2011	Best Music Video We TOTALLY Get	"Countdown"	Won	
Virgin Media Music Awards (Note: The Virgin Media Awards is an online awards group.)	2009	Best Solo Female	Beyoncé	Nominated	
Virgin Media Music Awards	2009	Hottest Female	Beyoncé	Nominated	
Virgin Media Music Awards	2009	Best Track	"Single Ladies (Put a Ring on It)"	Nominated	
Virgin Media Music Awards	2010	Best Collaboration	"Telephone" (Lady Gaga featuring Beyoncé)	Won	
Virgin Media Music Awards	2010	Best Video	"Telephone" (Lady Gaga featuring Beyoncé)	Nominated	
Virgin Media Music Awards	2010	Best Collaboration	"Telephone" (Lady Gaga featuring Beyoncé)	Nominated	
Virgin Media Music Awards	2011	Hottest Female	Beyoncé	Nominated	
Virgin Media Music Awards	2011	Best Female	Beyoncé	Nominated	
Virgin Media Music Awards	2011	Best Live Act	Beyoncé	Nominated	
Virgin Media Music Awards	2011	Best Track	"Run the World (Girls)"	Nominated	
Virgin Media Music Awards	2011	Best Video	"Run the World (Girls)"	Nominated	
Virgin Media Music Awards	2011	Best Album	4	Nominated	
Vogue Beauty Awards	2024	The Textured Hair Hero	Cécred Moisture Sealing Lotion	Runner-up	
Vogue Beauty Awards	2025	Highly Commended	Cécred Restoring Hair & Edge Drops	Won	
Vogue India Beauty Awards	2010	Best of Celebrity Fragrance	Heat	Won	
Waffle House Awards	2018	Best R&B/Hip Hop Artist	Beyoncé	Won	
WatsUp TV Africa Music Video Awards	2018	Best International Video	"Formation"	Won	
WEB Awards	2011	Outstanding Achievement in Web Development	Heat	Won	
Webby Awards	2014	People's Voice Award	Beyoncé	Won	
Webby Awards	2016	Best Music Website	Beyoncé	Nominated	
Webby Awards	2016	Best Use of Photography	Beyoncé	Won	
Webby Awards	2017	Best Music Video	"Formation"	Won	
Women's Health Beauty Award	2024	Best Hair Mask	Cécred Reconstructing Treatment Mask	Won	
Women's Health Beauty Award	2025	Best Edge Product	Cécred Restoring Hair & Edge Drops	Won	
World Music Awards	2006	World's Best-selling R&B Artist	Beyoncé	Won	
World Music Awards	2008	Outstanding Contribution to Music	Beyoncé	Won	
World Music Awards	2010	World's Best-selling R&B Artist	Beyoncé	Nominated	
World Music Awards	2010	World's Best Single	"Single Ladies (Put a Ring on It)"	Nominated	
World Music Awards	2014	World's Best R&B Artist	Beyoncé	Won	
World Music Awards	2014	World's Best Female Artist	Beyoncé	Nominated	
World Music Awards	2014	World's Best Live Act	Beyoncé	Nominated	
World Music Awards	2014	World's Best Entertainer	Beyoncé	Nominated	
World Music Awards	2014	World's Best Fanbase	BeyHive	Nominated	
World Music Awards	2014	World's Best Song	"Drunk in Love" (featuring Jay-Z)	Nominated	
World Music Awards	2014	World's Best Song	"Partition"	Nominated	
World Music Awards	2014	World's Best Album	Beyoncé	Nominated	
World Music Awards	2014	World's Best Video	"Drunk in Love" (featuring Jay-Z)	Nominated	
World Music Awards	2014	World's Best Video	"Partition"	Nominated	
World Music Awards	2014	World's Best Video	"XO"	Nominated	
World Music Awards	2014	World's Best Video	Life Is But a Dream	Nominated	
World Music Awards	2014	World's Best Female Album	Beyoncé	Won	
WorldFest-Houston International Film Festival	2020	Best Music Video	"Brown Skin Girl" (with Blue Ivy Carter, Saint Jhn and Wizkid)	Won	
WOWIE Awards	2020	Outstanding Protest Anthem	"Black Parade"	Won	
WOWIE Awards	2024	Best Documentary	Renaissance: A Film by Beyoncé	Won	
WOWIE Awards	2024	Best Album	Cowboy Carter	Nominated	
Xfinity On Demand Award	2011	Most-Viewed R&B Artist	Beyoncé	Won	
Xfinity On Demand Award	2011	Most-Viewed Musical Artist	Beyoncé	Won	
Xfinity On Demand Award	2012	Most-Viewed Musical Artist	Beyoncé	Won	
Yahoo! Music Turning Purple Awards	2007	Turning Purple Award	"Beautiful Liar" (with Shakira)	Won	
Yahoo! Music Turning Purple Awards	2007	Turning Purple Award	"Irreplaceable"	Won	
Year in Vevo Awards	2015	Best Dance Video	"7/11"	Won	
Year in Vevo Awards	2015	Vevo Vision Award	"Runnin' (Lose It All)" (Naughty Boy featuring Beyoncé and Arrow Benjamin)	Won	
YouTube Music Awards	2015	YouTube Music Award	Beyoncé	Won	
Žebřík Music Awards	2003	International Female Singer	Beyoncé	9th	
Žebřík Music Awards	2006	International Female Singer	Beyoncé	9th	
Žebřík Music Awards	2009	International Female Singer	Beyoncé	4th	
Žebřík Music Awards	2009	International Music DVD	I Am... Yours: An Intimate Performance at Wynn Las Vegas	6th	
Žebřík Music Awards	2010	International Music Video	"Telephone" (Lady Gaga featuring Beyoncé)	Silver	
Žebřík Music Awards	2013	International Female Singer	Beyoncé	4th	
Žebřík Music Awards	2014	International Female Singer	Beyoncé	Silver	

== Other accolades ==
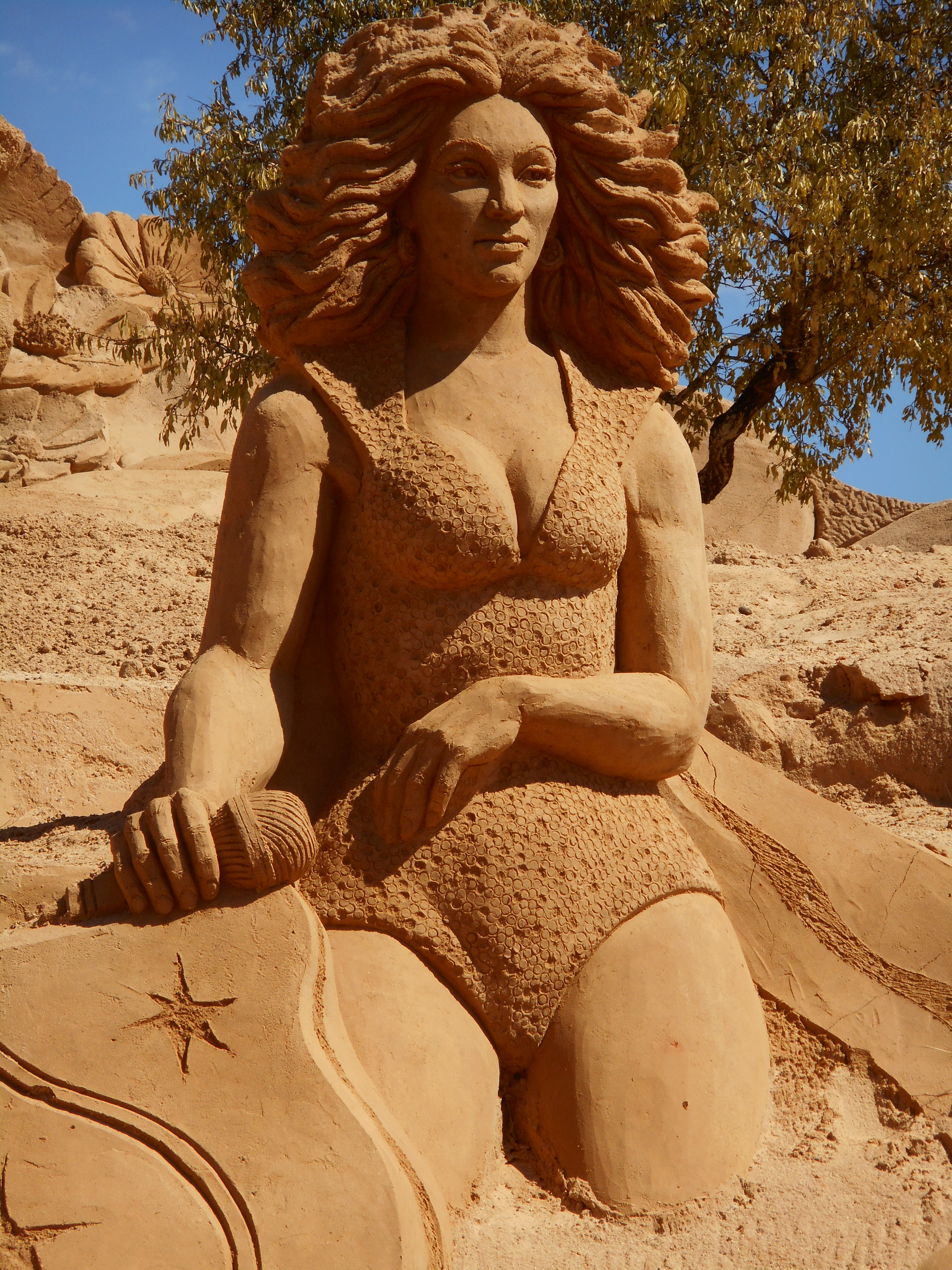
Knowles' sand sculpture at the International Sand Sculpture Festival in 2015.

=== State honors ===
Key
‡	Indicates an honor Beyoncé was considered for only

Name of country, year given, and name of honor
Country	Year	Honor	Ref.
Australia	2014	Barnardos Australia's Mother of the Year	
Europe	2006	European School of Economics's Lifetime Achievement Award	
Nigeria	2017	Most Influential People of African Descent (MIPAD)'s Global Honoree	
United States	2000	Inducted into the Young Hollywood Hall of Fame (Music Artist Category)	
United States	2002	St. John's Church's Philanthropist Award	
United States	2006	Star on Hollywood Walk of Fame (Recording Category as a member of Destiny's Child)	
United States	2008	Inducted into the Miami Children's Hospital's Pediatric Hall of Fame	
United States	2016	Council of Fashion Designers of America's Fashion Icon	
United States	2016	Inducted into the Headwear Hall of Fame	
United States	2016	‡ May 23, Minnesota (Beyoncé Day)	
United States	2018	Key to Columbia	
United States	2018	‡ August 21, Columbia, Missouri (Beyoncé and Jay-Z Day)	
United States	2018	Key to New Orleans	
United States	2018	‡ August 29, Orlando, Florida (Beyoncé and Jay-Z Day)	
United States	2018	‡ August 8, Minnesota (Beyoncé and Jay-Z Day)	
United States	2020	WACO Wearable Art Gala's Humanitarian Award	
United States	2022	HBCU Classic Impact Award	
United States	2023	‡ July 20, Minneapolis (Bey Day)	
United States	2023	‡ July 20, Minnesota (Beyoncé Day)	
United States	2023	‡ New Jersey (Queen Honey-Bey of the Garden State)	
United States	2023	‡ August 6, Maryland (Beyoncé Day)	
United States	2023	‡ August 11, Atlanta (Beyoncé Day)	
United States	2023	‡ August 11, Georgia (U.S. state) (Beyoncé Day)	
United States	2023	‡ August 21, St. Louis (Queen Bey Day)	
United States	2023	‡ August 30, Honorary Mayor of Santa Clara, California	
United States	2023	Key to Santa Clara	
United States	2023	‡ August 30, California (U.S. state) (Beyoncé Day)	
United States	2023	Key to Seattle	
United States	2026	National Recording Registry for Single Ladies (Put a Ring on It)	

=== World records ===
Name of publication, year the record was awarded, name of the record, and the name of the record holder
Publication	Year	World record	Record holder	R. Status	Ref.
Guinness World Records	2008	Highest Annual Earnings by a Female Singer	Beyoncé	Eliminated	
Guinness World Records	2010	Most Grammy Awards nominations in a single year for a female artist	Beyoncé	Record	
Guinness World Records	2010	Most Grammy Awards won in a single year by a female artist	Beyoncé	Record	
Guinness World Records	2011	Biggest Power Couple	Beyoncé and Jay-Z	Eliminated	
Guinness World Records	2011	Most-retweeted About Moment	Beyoncé and Jay-Z	Eliminated	
Guinness World Records	2013	Fastest-selling album on iTunes	Beyoncé	Eliminated	
Guinness World Records	2014	Highest earning couple in Hollywood ever	Beyoncé and Jay-Z	Record	
Guinness World Records	2014	Highest annual earnings for a female singer (current year)	Beyoncé	Record	
Guinness World Records	2014	Highest-ranked female musician in Forbes’ "Celebrity 100" list	Beyoncé	Record	
Guinness World Records	2015	First artist-owned music streaming service	Tidal	Record	
Guinness World Records	2016	Most simultaneous Billboard US Hot 100 entries by a female artist	Beyoncé	Eliminated	
Guinness World Records	2016	Most simultaneous Billboard US Hot R&B/Hip-Hop Top 10 entries by a female artist	Beyoncé	Eliminated	
Guinness World Records	2016	First act to debut at No. 1 with their first six studio albums (USA)	Beyoncé	Record	
Guinness World Records	2017	Most-liked Instagram Picture	Beyoncé	Eliminated	
Guinness World Records	2017	Best-selling single (Spain)	Amor Gitano	Record	
Guinness World Records	2018	Most MTV Video Music Awards nominations for video of the year (female)	Beyoncé	Record	
Guinness World Records	2018	Most current Twitter engagements (average retweets) for a female musician	Beyoncé	Record	
Guinness World Records	2018	Highest-grossing Music Tour by a Duo (current year)	Beyoncé and Jay-Z	Record	
Guinness World Records	2020	Most Grammy Awards Nominations for a Female Artist	Beyoncé	Record	
Guinness World Records	2021	Most Grammy Awards won by a married couple	Beyoncé and Jay-Z	Record	
Guinness World Records	2021	Most Grammy Awards won by a vocalist	Beyoncé	Record	
Guinness World Records	2021	Most Grammy Awards won by a female artist	Beyoncé	Record	
Guinness World Records	2021	First female artist to win Best Rap Performance at the Grammy Awards	Beyoncé and Megan Thee Stallion	Record	
Guinness World Records	2023	Hall of Fame	Beyoncé	Inducted	
Guinness World Records	2023	Most BET Awards won by an individual	Beyoncé	Record	
Guinness World Records	2023	Most BET Awards nominations for an individual	Beyoncé	Record	
Guinness World Records	2023	Most wins at the MTV Video Music Awards	Beyoncé	Record	
Guinness World Records	2023	Most Grammy Awards nominations for Record of the Year	Beyoncé	Record	
Guinness World Records	2026	Spotlight ICONS	Beyoncé	Listed	
Other records	2006	Only artist to have topped the Billboard Hot 100 for at least 10 consecutive weeks with a single, both as a soloist and as part of a group	Beyoncé	Record	
Other records	2013	Most-searched person on Bing (Current year)	Beyoncé	Record	
Other records	2014	Youngest artist to achieve 20 career Grammy Awards wins	Beyoncé	Record	
Other records	2016	First artist to have Grammy Awards nominations across four different genres in the same year	Beyoncé	Record	
Other records	2016	Most Googled artist of 2016	Beyoncé	Record	
Other records	2016	Most Googled song of 2016 (Formation)	Beyoncé	Record	
Other records	2016	First female siblings to have both had number one solo albums on the Billboard 200	Beyoncé and Solange	Record	
Other records	2018	Most-viewed Coachella performance on YouTube live stream	Beyoncé	Record	
Other records	2018	First black female artist to headline Coachella	Beyoncé	Record	
Other records	2019	Most Soul Train Music Awards	Beyoncé	Record	
Other records	2020	Most searched performance in Google's history	Beyoncé: 2018 Coachella performance	Record	
Other records	2020	Only artist with Billboard Hot 100 new No.1 hits in four different decades	Beyoncé	Record	
Other records	2021	Most NAACP Image Awards	Beyoncé	Record	
Other records	2021	All-time highest-grossing R&B touring artist	Beyoncé	Record	
Other records	2021	All-time highest-grossing black touring artist	Beyoncé	Record	
Other records	2022	Biggest one-month tour gross in boxscore history (Billboard)	Beyoncé	Record	
Other records	2022	Only artist to chart simultaneously at No.1 on 23 different Billboard charts	Beyoncé	Record	
Other records	2022	Only female artist to have at least 20 top 10 singles as a solo artist and at least 10 top 10 singles as a member of a group on the Billboard Hot 100 chart	Beyoncé	Record	
Other records	2022	Only female solo act to debut at No.1 with their first seven studio albums (USA)	Beyoncé	Record	
Other records	2022	Most American Music Awards for Favorite Soul/R&B Female Artist (7)	Beyoncé	Record	
Other records	2022	Female artist with nominations across the most Grammy fields (11)	Beyoncé	Record	
Other records	2023	Most Grammy Awards won for consecutive studio albums (8)	Beyoncé	Record	
Other records	2023	Most Grammy Awards wins in history	Beyoncé	Record	
Other records	2023	Highest first-day merch sales from an artist collaboration with Amazon Music	Beyoncé	Record	
Other records	2023	Highest-grossing tour in history by a female R&B artist	Beyoncé: Renaissance World Tour	Record	
Other records	2023	Highest-grossing tour in history by a black female artist	Beyoncé: Renaissance World Tour	Record	
Other records	2023	Highest-grossing tour in history by a black artist	Beyoncé: Renaissance World Tour	Eliminated	
Other records	2023	Most tours (4) grossing over US$200 million each (female)	Beyoncé:	Record	
Other records	2023	Most streamed album globally in 2023 on Deezer	Beyoncé: Renaissance	Record	
Other records	2024	First black female artist to top the Apple Music Country chart	Beyoncé	Record	
Other records	2024	First black female artist in the modern history of country music, to have a No.1 on the Billboard Hot Country Songs chart	Beyoncé	Record	
Other records	2024	First black female artist to top the Billboard Hot 100 with a country song	Beyoncé	Record	
Other records	2024	First black female to top both the Billboard Hot 100 and Hot Country Songs charts	Beyoncé	Record	
Other records	2024	First black artist to top Billboard's Hot 100 and Hot Country charts simultaneously	Beyoncé	Record	
Other records	2024	Number 1's on most different multi-metric Billboard charts, by a female artist (7)	Beyoncé	Record	
Other records	2024	Only female artist to have topped both the Billboard Hot Country Songs and Hot R&B/Hip-Hop Songs charts since listing began in October 1958	Beyoncé	Record	
Other records	2024	Only artist to have No.1s on the following combination of Billboard charts: Hot 100, Hot Country Songs, Hot Dance/Electronic Songs, Hot Gospel Songs, Hot Latin Songs, Hot R&B Songs and Hot R&B/Hip-Hop Songs (over the course of their career)	Beyoncé	Record	
Other records	2024	The first song in music history to simultaneously chart across US Pop, Hot AC, AC, Country, Rhythmic, Hip Hop, R&B and Triple A radio formats (Texas Hold ‘Em)	Beyoncé	Record	
Other records	2024	Most Billboard airplay charts on which any artist has appeared (18)	Beyoncé	Record	
Other records	2024	Most first-day streams for a country album by a female artist in the history of Amazon Music (Cowboy Carter)	Beyoncé	Record	
Other records	2024	Biggest debut for any album by a black female artist on Spotify (Cowboy Carter)	Beyoncé	Record	
Other records	2024	Only female artist to debut at No.1 on the Billboard 200 chart with her first eight solo studio albums	Beyoncé	Record	
Other records	2024	First black female artist to reach No.1 on Billboard's Top Country Albums Chart	Beyoncé	Record	
Other records	2024	First female artist to occupy the top three positions simultaneously on the Billboard Hot Country Songs	Beyoncé	Record	
Other records	2024	First time two black artists have topped the Hot Country Songs chart back-to-back since the chart's creation in 1958	Beyoncé and Shaboozey	Record	
Other records	2024	First black artist to take a country album to No.1 on the UK's Official Albums Chart	Beyoncé	Record	
Other records	2024	Only artist to achieve an Official UK Chart double with a country album and country single (Cowboy Carter and Texas Hold 'Em)	Beyoncé	Record	
Other records	2024	Most Grammy Awards nominations	Beyoncé	Record	
Other records	2024	First black female artist to win a country award at the Billboard Music Awards	Beyoncé	Record	
Other records	2025	First black female artist to win a Grammy Award for Best Country Album	Beyoncé	Record	
Other records	2025	First black artist to win a Grammy Award for Best Country Album	Beyoncé	Record	
Other records	2025	First black female artist to win Favorite Female Country Artist at the American Music Awards	Beyoncé	Record	
Other records	2025	First black female artist to win Favorite Country Album at the American Music Awards	Beyoncé	Record	
Other records	2025	Highest single-venue engagement for a female artist in Billboard boxscore history	Beyoncé	Record	
Other records	2025	First woman and first American artist to gross $400M+ on two separate tours	Beyoncé	Record	
Other records	2025	Shortest tour to gross $400M+	Beyoncé	Record	
Other records	2025	Highest grossing country tour in Billboard Boxscore history	Beyoncé	Record	
Other records	2025	First female artist to top the Billboard Boxscore charts seven times in a row	Beyoncé	Record	

=== Listicles ===
Name of publisher, name of listicle, year(s) listed, and placement result
Publisher	Listicle	Year(s)	Result	Ref.
ABC	Barbara Walters' 10 Most Fascinating People	2003	Placed	
Associated Press	Album of the Decade	2019	1st (Lemonade)	
Billboard	Artist of the Decade	2009	4th	
Billboard	Female Artist of the Decade	2009	1st	
Billboard	Hot 100 Artist of the Decade	2009	2nd	
Billboard	Hot 100 Female Artist of the Decade	2009	1st	
Billboard	Radio Songs Artist of the Decade	2009	1st	
Billboard	Power 100	2012, 2014, 2020	1st	
Billboard	The 10 Defining Artists of the 2010s (So Far)	2015	1st	
Billboard	The 100 Greatest Award Show Performances of All Time	2017	1st (Lemonade Medley - MTV Video Music Awards, 2016)	
Billboard	R&B/Hip-Hop Power Player	2017–2019	Placed (as CEO of Parkwood Entertainment)	
Billboard	The 100 Greatest Music Videos of the 2010s	2019	1st (Formation)	
Billboard	Greatest Pop Stars of the 21st Century	2024	1st	
Billboard	R&B/Hip-Hop Artists of the 21st Century	2025	2nd	
Billboard	R&B/Hip-Hop Female Artist of the 21st Century	2025	1st	
Billboard	The Top Producers of the 21st Century on the Hot 100	2025	6th	
Billboard	The Top Female Producers of the 21st Century on the Hot 100	2025	1st	
BBC	Music's Most Powerful Women	2018	1st	
Consequence	Top 100 Albums of the 2010s	2019	1st (Lemonade)	
Consequence	Top 25 Tours of the 2010s	2019	1st (Formation World Tour)	
Consequence	The 100 Best Vocalists of All Time	2026	6th	
Entertainment Weekly	Power List	2003	Placed	
Entertainment Weekly	Entertainers of the Year	2003	Placed	
Entertainment Weekly	Entertainers of the Year	2006	Placed	
Entertainment Weekly	Entertainer of the Decade	2009	1st	
Entertainment Weekly	Hottie of the Decade	2009	1st	
Entertainment Weekly	Entertainers of the Year	2016	Placed	
Entertainment Weekly	Best of the Decade	2019	Placed	
Entertainment Weekly	Entertainers of the Year	2023	Placed	
Entertainment Weekly	Entertainers of the Year	2024	Placed	
Forbes	World's Highest-Paid Women in Music	2008, 2010, 2014, 2017	1st	
Forbes	World's 100 Most Powerful Women	2010	9th	
Forbes	Celebrity 100	2014	1st	
Forbes	Iconoclast 50	2026	Placed	
The Guardian	Artist of the Decade	2009	1st	
Insider	Artist of the Decade	2019	Placed	
NPR	The 21st Century's Most Influential Women Musicians	2018	1st	
Recording Industry Association of America	Certified Artist of the Decade	2010	1st	
Recording Industry Association of America	Certified Female Artist of the Decade	2010	1st	
Recording Industry Association of America	Most master ringtone certifications for the Decade (Overall)	2010	1st	
Recording Industry Association of America	Most master ringtone certifications for the Decade (Female)	2010	1st	
Recording Industry Association of America	Highest-certified master ringtone – Female	2010	1st (Irreplaceable)	
Rolling Stone	50 Best Albums of 2016	2016	1st (Lemonade)	
Rolling Stone	The 100 Greatest Songs of the Century – So Far	2018	1st (Crazy in Love)	
Rolling Stone	The 100 Greatest Music Videos	2021	1st (Formation)	
Rolling Stone	100 Best Albums of 2022	2022	1st (Renaissance)	
Rolling Stone	200 Greatest Singers of All Time	2023	8th	
Rolling Stone	500 Greatest Albums of All Time	2023	32nd (Lemonade); 71st (Renaissance); 81st (Beyoncé)	
Rolling Stone	The 250 Greatest Albums of the 21st Century So Far	2025	1st (Lemonade)	
Time	100 Most Influential People in the World	2013	Placed	
Time	100 Most Influential People in the World	2014	Placed	
Time	Women of the Year	2014	1st	
Time	100 Most Influential People in the World	2023	Placed	
Time	Time Person of the Year	2016	Placed	
Tumblr	Tumblr's Artist of the Year	2016	2nd	
Tumblr	Tumblr's Album of the Year	2016	1st (Lemonade)	
USA Today	Musician of the Year	2016	1st	
USA Today	Musicians of the Decade	2020	Placed	
Variety	Variety500: The 500 Most Important People in Global Media	2017–2022	Placed	
Variety	Variety Power of Women	2016	Placed	
Variety	Women's Impact	2013	Placed	
VH1	The Greatest 100 Songs of the ’00s	2011	1st (Crazy in Love)	
VH1	VH1's 100 Greatest Women In Music	2012	3rd	
Wired	The 10 Best Artists of the 2010s	2019	Placed	
YPulse	The 17 Musicians Gen Z & Millennials Say Represent Their Generations	2019	Placed	

== See also ==
- List of awards and nominations received by Destiny's Child
- List of awards and nominations received by The Carters
- Grammy Award records
