= Space NK =

British chain of cosmetics stores

Coordinates: 51°30′49.3″N 0°7′30.7″W

Space NK (formerly known as Space NK Apothecary) is a British retailer specializing in personal care and beauty products.

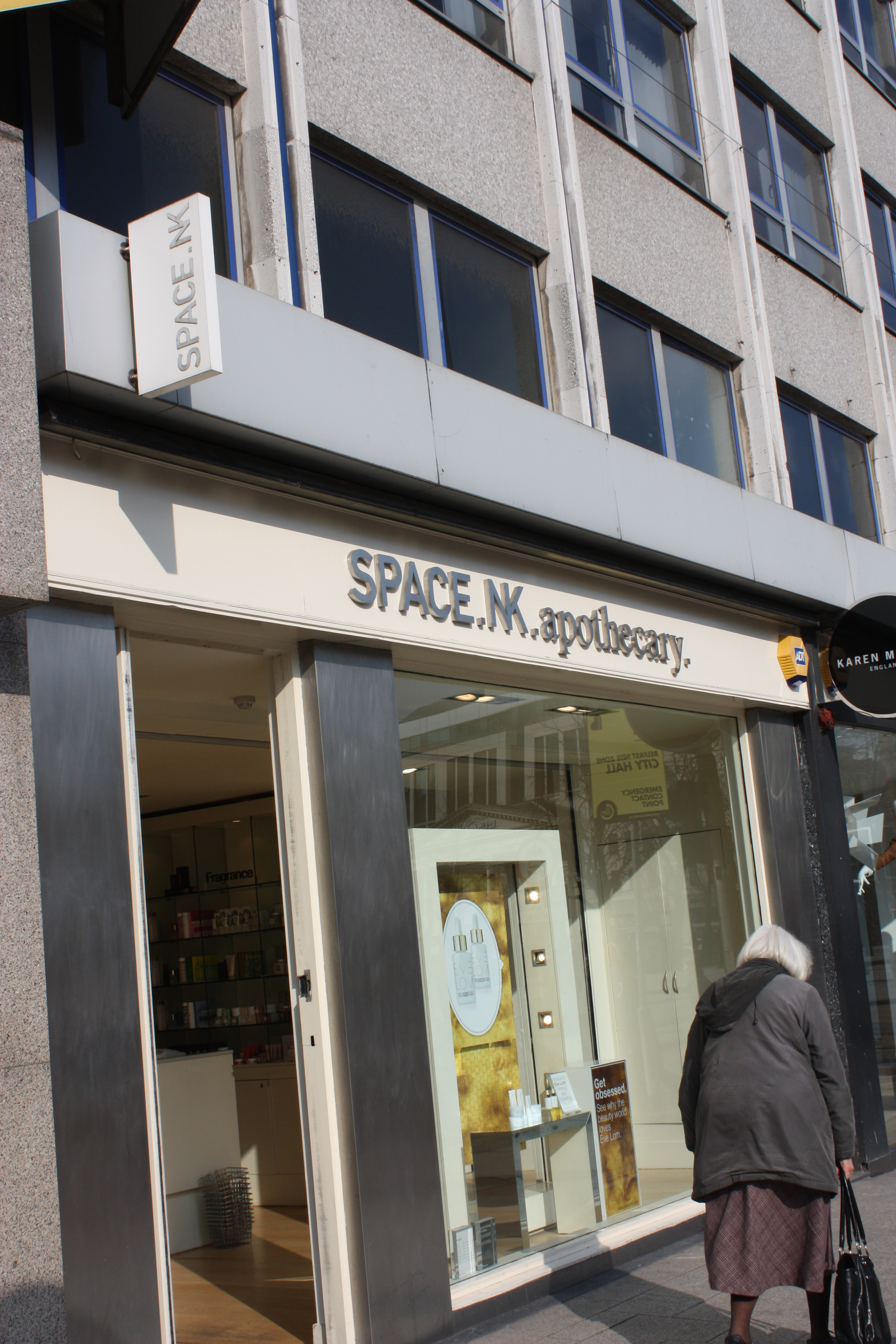
Space NK store in Belfast, Northern Ireland

== History ==
The company was founded in 1991 and originally named Space NK Apothecary (stylised as (SPACE.NK.apothecary), by Nicky Kinnaird, with the first store opening in Covent Garden in 1993. Initially, the company sold fresh smoothies, as well as beauty products and fashion items that were not widely accessible at the time, including Diptyque, By Terry and Nars, to name a few. Shortly after, in 1996, the brand narrowed it's sales down to just beauty products.

Space NK became a Manzanita company in 2002, and has continued to grow, as can be shown from the jump of approximately 75 SpaceNK stores in 2023, to now 90 stores.

During the rise of Space NK's popularity, several of its stores popped up across the country, including the opening of one in Duke of York Square in London, in 2003. Only a year after did the company become officially available online (in 2004).

The online SpaceNK first launched in the US in 2008.

In 2014, after working for SpaceNK for 21 years, Nicky Kinnaird made the decision to part ways with the company, in order to work on building her very own brand consultancy.

Four years after Nicky Kinnaird's departure, Manzanita also considered giving up the company, with rumours that Unilever would be interested in taking over. However, this transaction never took place and Manzanita remains the owner of SpaceNK. Since around that time, in 2019 to be specific, Andy Lightfoot has been the CEO of the company.

In 2020, Space NK repositioned its US business into Wholesale+; a fully serviced wholesale model offering prestige skin, hair and make-up brands across over 50 Nordstrom and Bloomingdale's stores.

In 2022, SpaceNK not only launched in Walmart stores in the US, but it also opened its first ever store with two-floors in the place where it all began, Covent garden, London.

In November 2024, Space NK warned customers of a social media scam which saw fraudsters creating false advertisements claiming to sell its £250 advent calendar for just £28.99.

In July 2025, Space NK was acquired by US retailer Ulta Beauty.

== Brands and Products ==
Space NK offers a range of products, including skincare, cosmetics and gadgets.

In 2022, SpaceNK launched some highly sought after brands, such as Rare Beauty, Tatcha and JVN.

As of 22nd September 2026, Beyonce's new haircare brand Cécred, has officially launched in all SpaceNK stores across the UK, as well as online. This new addition to the shelves of SpaceNK has had unprecedented success, with its weakly sales target being reached by just 1pm on the day of its launch. The addition of the new brand 'Cécred', is said to have been the biggest brand launch to ever come to SpaceNK.

== Services ==
The newly refurbished SpaceNK store in Westfield, London, has been focusing on improving customer experience and satisfaction through its various additions of immersive customer activities. Examples include: 1:1 beauty consultation pods, treatment rooms for facials, a play table for trying out cosmetic products, and more.
