= Cécred =

American hair care brand

- Type: Private
- Industry: Professional hair care
- Founded: 2024; 2 years ago
- Founder: Beyoncé Knowles-Carter
- Area served: Worldwide
- Key people: Beyoncé Knowles-Carter (founder and chairperson); Grace Ray (CEO); Tina Knowles (vice chairperson); Neal Farinah (lead global stylist); Dr. Kari Williams (head of education)
- Owner: Beyoncé Knowles-Carter
- Website: www.cecred.com

Cécred (pronounced 'sacred') is a privately held American hair care brand founded in 2024 by singer-songwriter Beyoncé Knowles-Carter. It is self-funded and made for all hair types. After six years in development, Cécred launched in February 2024 to positive reception from critics.

Cécred became a rapid success, amassing 2 million paying customers in its first six months on the market.

== Background and development ==
How many of y'all knew my first job was sweeping hair in my mama’s salon? Destiny’s Child got our start by performing for clients while they were getting their hair done. I was exposed to so many different kinds of entrepreneurial women in her salon. I saw firsthand how the ways we nurture and celebrate hair can directly impact our souls. I watched her heal and be of service to so many women. Having learned so much on my hair journey, I’ve always dreamed of carrying on her legacy [...] I can’t wait for you to experience what I’ve been creating.

— Beyoncé via Instagram.

Cécred is a hair care brand developed and launched in 2024 by American singer-songwriter Beyoncé Knowles-Carter. The brand was developed over six years prior to its launch, which included product development and clinical, lab and salon trials. The products were initially hinted at in May 2023, when Beyoncé shared an Instagram post of her tending to her natural hair with a curling iron surrounded by unlabeled sample bottles.

In December 2023, Cécred product designs were silently revealed in Renaissance: A Film by Beyoncé in a scene backstage.

On February 6, 2024, Beyoncé posted a video to social media announcing the name of the brand and the launch date, February 20. Captioned "hair is sacred", the video featured clips of a younger Beyoncé in her mother's (Tina Knowles) hair salon, as well as women with a variety of hair textures (including Beyoncé) having their hair tended to. Tina Knowles serves as the vice chairperson of the brand.

== Launch years ==
Cécred launched on February 20, 2024, with a foundation collection of eight products "inspired by hair rituals from global cultures [...] featur[ing] an array of butters, oils, honey, and fermented rice water to nourish hair that cleanse[s], condition[s], and visibly repair[s]." Beyoncé and her mother Tina said that "[Cécred was] something we spoke about — a dream — since Destiny's Child first started out with the 'Bills, Bills, Bills' video. We talked about creating a sacred space."

On August 1, 2024, Cécred began post-launch products. A scented candle was released on October 15, 2024 alongside two new kits. On November 29, 2024, Cécred-themed hoodies were released. On August 25, 2025, a Lapis-colored 'Protection' collection tailored to easing the takedown of protective hairstyles and extensions was launched.

To commemorate the brand's one year anniversary, Cécred partnered with Ulta Beauty to bring the collection to its 1,400 locations, beginning April 6, 2025. Within just one day in stores, they had doubled their weekly sales projections. In December 2025, Robyn-Melissa Watkins, Ulta Beauty's Head of Development, announced that it was officially the number one prestige hair brand launch in Ulta Beauty History.

As of August 2025, Cécred sells one 'Restoring Hair & Edge Drops' serum every sixteen seconds, having garnered a waitlist of more than 100,000 consumers for the product. This gives the product alone a run rate upwards of $100 million.

A styling collection was launched on March 19, 2026, focused on heat-styling and finishing products. On September 10, 2026, Cécred launched Temple Oud Hair Perfume, a perfume version of the scent of their foundation and styling products. It is formulated to work with the chemistry of all hair types, and also acts as standard body perfume. It follows the popularity of the scent of the Cécred products.

== International expansion ==
While worldwide direct-to-consumer shipping had been available since launch, Cécred partnered with SpaceNK to expand physical retail to the UK on September 22, 2026. The launch became the biggest in Space NK’s history, with Cécred meeting its full week’s projected sales by 1:00 p.m. on launch day, and surpassing previous first‑day performance for a new brand. Cécred CEO Grace Ray stated that the UK had been the brand’s largest market outside the United States. The collection rolled out across Space NK’s 90 stores in the UK and Ireland and on the retailer’s website.

== Formulation technologies ==
=== Foundation collection ===
Beyoncé stated that she could not find hair technology that works for all hair textures, so she funded the development of a custom bioactive keratin ferment technology for Cécred. Ethically sourced natural wool protein is made bioavailable and molecular in size, mimicking keratin in human hair to repair and reinforce weak or damaged hair of the user, and to penetrate the cortex of individual hair strands. The ferment is activated by infused honey and probiotic lactobacillus which also act as a humectant. As of launch, Cécred formulas are infused with a Temple Oud fragrance, including notes of oud, Australian sandalwood, warm musk, night-blooming jasmine, Haitian vetiver and violet leaves.

=== Restoring Hair & Edge Drops ===
The Restoring Hair and Edge Drops serum uses an original bioactive complex by Cécred, Biopeptide-5. The peptide complex stimulates protein biosynthesis of collagen and laminin to reactivate dormant hair follicles and help stimulate the anagen phase, strengthening the dermal junction to improve anchorage and density.

=== Protection collection ===
The protection collection uses their proprietary technology, PhytoFerment, a biofermented bioactive CO2 extract combination. It is formulated of goldenseal and goldenrod for healing properties, and tea tree, rosemary, eucalyptus, and clove for scalp cleansing, balancing and comforting properties. It is biofermented and hydrated with purple willow bark. The combination nourishes, soothes and removes impurities from the scalp and hair strands.

=== Styling collection ===
The styling collection uses their proprietary technology called StemShield Complex. The formulation combines shape-memory polymers, lipids of plant stem cells and black honey fermentation to retain hair structure and resist humidity, pollution and heat damage. Every product in the collection is heat resistant up to 450°F.

== Critical reception ==
Cécred received positive reviews from critics on launch. Sarah Jossel of The Times described it as "outrageously good." Carol Lee of Elle said that "the products worked their magic" and that "after just one Cécred session, my scalp and strands felt transformed." Julee Wilson of Cosmopolitan was "impressed" at the launch line products' results, describing her strands as "beautifully conditioned" and claiming her silk press lasted for a week. Jessica Cruel of Allure described her hair as "transformed."

Bustle tested the launch products on two editors with opposite hair textures, Jordan Murray and Olivia Rose Rushing. By the end, both had integrated the products into their own personal hair routines. In 2025, Ava Welsing-Kitcher of The Independent highly endorsed Cécred's reconstructing treatment.

== Philanthropy ==
On the day of launch, Cécred established an annual grant in collaboration with Beyoncé's charity foundation BeyGood, to provide financial support to cosmetology students and professional hair stylists within the beauty industry. $500,000 is allocated annually to fund cosmetology school scholarships and salon business grants across five cities chosen for their large, diverse community of hair stylists: Atlanta, Chicago, Houston, Los Angeles and Clementon.

== Awards ==
Cécred has received numerous industry awards, including the 2025 WWD Beauty Inc Award for Prestige Brand of the Year, as well as multiple honors from Vogue, Allure, Cosmopolitan, Elle, and other beauty publications. Its “Who’s In The CÉCRED Salon” series was named a 2026 Webby Awards Honoree in the Branded Content: Fashion, Beauty & Lifestyle category.
