= Zimbabwean Lives Matter =

Zimbabwean Lives Matter is a Zimbabwean protest movement modeled after the American Black Lives Matter campaign. The protest movement is directed towards the Zimbabwean government of incumbent Emmerson Mnangagwa who took over through a 2017 bloodless coup from Robert Mugabe.

== Celebrities who have endorsed the cause ==
Celebrities who have expressed support for the protest include former Botswana President Ian Khama, Ice Cube, Lecrae and actresses Thandiwe Newton, Beyoncé Knowles and Pearl Thusi. Tsitsi Dangarembga, retired South African Rugby player of Zimbabwean origin Tendai Mtawarira and Thomas Mapfumo were some of the Zimbabweans who also expressed support. The protest movement had more than 700,000 tweets as of August 2020.

== Organizers ==
Like the Black Lives Matter protest movement, the Zimbabwean Lives Matter protest movement does not have a central organizer as most of the activists have been protesting through their microblogging Twitter accounts. A repository of Zimbabwean Lives Matter materials has been created.
