= SirDavis =

Brand of American whisky

- Type: Joint venture
- Industry: Whisky
- Founded: 2024
- Founder: Beyoncé Knowles-Carter; Bill Lumsden
- Headquarters: Houston, Texas
- Website: sirdavis.com

SirDavis is an American whisky launched in 2024. The brand is a joint venture between luxury goods conglomerate Moët Hennessy and singer Beyoncé Knowles-Carter. SirDavis is named after Knowles-Carter's great-grandfather Davis Hogue, a Prohibition-era moonshiner and farmer in the American South. The whisky is finished, blended, and bottled in Texas, with headquarters in Houston. In August 2024, Moët Hennessy announced that the product would be available in the U.S. and select stores in London, Paris, and Tokyo beginning in September 2024.

== History ==
I knew I wanted to create a whisky brand before I knew the story of my great-grandfather. Discovering my history has been deeply inspiring and motivating. Our whisky’s legacy dates back over 200 years to a Black man in Alabama in the 1800s... a man who was a businessman and an entrepreneur, but would have never had the opportunity to create a mainstream whisky back then. Systemic barriers would not have allowed it.

— Beyoncé speaking to GQ in September 2024.

Hogue, Knowles-Carter's paternal great-grandfather, was a farmer and moonshiner in the American South during Prohibition who is said to have stashed whiskey bottles in the empty knots of cedar trees for friends and kin to discover and imbibe. When Mathew Knowles visited his grandfather at the distillery, it was the first time he heard a black man referred to as “Sir.”

Knowles-Carter, a whisky enthusiast, approached Moët Hennessy about developing a new whisky. Bill Lumsden, who helped create Glenmorangie and Ardbeg, worked with Moët Hennessy to lead creation of the product. Working with Knowles-Carter and blender Cameron George, he selected the brand's mash bill of 51% rye and 49% malted barley and incorporated traditional whisky-making techniques from Japanese and Scottish whiskies. The product is aged in American oak barrels and finished in Pedro Ximénez sherry casks, and is the first spirits brand developed entirely internally by Moët Hennessy in the U.S.

As of July 2026, Knowles-Carter is the sole owner of SirDavis having bought out Moët Hennesy.

== Product ==
SirDavis is 44% alcohol by volume and 88 proof. It has no age statement. It is deep copper in color, with a fruity (Seville oranges, raisins) and spicy (clove, cinnamon, ginger) aroma with notes of Demerara sugar and toffee. Its taste is reminiscent of toffee and spices (cinnamon, clove, rye spice), followed by malty and biscuity notes, and a citrus top note. The finish has hints of honey with notes of sultanas and cherries.

== Reception ==
Prior to its announcement, SirDavis was anonymously submitted to several spirits competitions under a "Davis Hogue Distillery Co." pseudonym. The whisky won Platinum and Best In Class for American Whiskey at the 2023 SIP Awards. It also scored a rating of 93 points at the 2023 Ultimate Spirits Challenge.

Awards
2023	SIP Awards	Platinum
2023	SIP Awards American Rye	Best in Class
2023	Spirits Challenge NY International	Gold
2023	Ultimate Spirits Challenge	93/100
2025	ASCOT Awards American Whiskey	Double Platinum
2025	ASCOT Awards Bottle Design	Platinum
2025	Bartender Spirits Awards	Gold
2025	Spirits Business Awards	Best New Product
2025	World Whiskies Awards Rye Sherry Cask	Bronze
2025	Fast Company Brands That Matter	Honoree
2025	Inc. Best in Business	Honoree
2026	Bartender Spirits Awards	Gold
2026	SIP Awards	Best of Class
2026	World Whiskies Awards Best Design Bottle	Silver

== Sales ==
As of June 2025, SirDavis had sold approximately 30,000 cases since its launch, and by September 2025 had established steady demand in restaurants and bars, retailing at $89–99 per bottle and commanding $16–22 per cocktail. Industry reports noted consistent sales, reliable movement, and the popularity of signature cocktails such as the Honey Bee and Davis Old Fashioned. The SirDavis Honey Bee Cocktail Kit became the fastest sellout in Cocktail Courier history.

== Philanthropy ==
SirDavis sponsored the Raise the Bar Mentorship Alliance in August 2026 and supported two $10,000 grants for hospitality industry projects.

== See also ==
- American whiskey
- List of whisky brands
