= BeyGood =

American non-profit organization

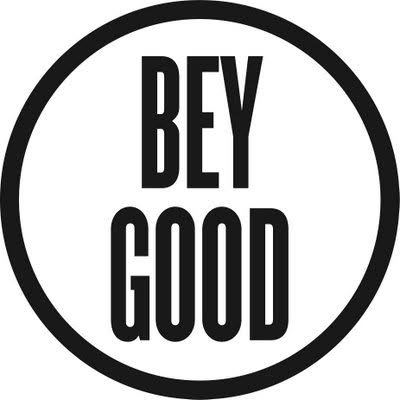
- Founded: 2013; 13 years ago
- Founder: Beyoncé
- Purpose: Humanitarian
- Region served: Worldwide
- Board of directors: Mai Lassiter; Kawanna Brown; Jay Brown; Cheryl Creuzot; Funmi Olorunnipa Badejo; Marilyn Booker
- Key people: Tina Knowles (chairwoman)
- Website: beygood.org

BeyGood (stylized as BeyGOOD) is a non-profit organization founded in 2013 by American singer-songwriter Beyoncé. It focuses on education and economic equity in marginalized and under-resourced communities.

== Background ==
In 1999, using proceeds from Destiny’s Child’s first single, Beyoncé and Kelly Rowland funded the construction of the Knowles–Rowland Center for Youth in Houston—a community facility providing recreational and youth services. Beyoncé also supported housing, food assistance, and other charitable causes, including co-founding the Survivor Foundation to aid victims of Hurricane Katrina. Her work during this period earned several honors, among them induction into the Miami Children’s Hospital Pediatric Hall of Fame in 2008.

The BeyGood initiative began during The Mrs. Carter Show World Tour as an extension of Beyoncé’s personal philanthropy. At selected stops during the tour, it teamed with local charities to raise funds and awareness, including a partnership with the Prince’s Trust that raised £85,000 for disadvantaged young people. The initiative later evolved into a formal nonprofit organization and now operates as a 501(c)(3) public charity known as the BeyGood Foundation. It has contributed to programs in education, entrepreneurship, health, housing, water access, and disaster relief in South Africa, Haiti, Burundi, the Caribbean, the United States, and other regions.

According to the foundation, everyone has the right to economic equity. It identifies education, employment, and entrepreneurship as key pathways to achieving this. BeyGood's mission is to advance economic equity by supporting organizations and programs that serve marginalized and under-resourced communities worldwide.

== Partnerships ==
BeyGood primarily collaborates with nonprofits, community organizations, and corporations to deliver its programs.

=== Non-profit partners ===
One of BeyGood’s longest-standing partnerships is with Bread of Life, Inc.—a Houston-based charity founded at St. John’s Downtown United Methodist Church (Beyoncé’s childhood church). By 2014, Beyoncé and her family had contributed more than $7 million to the organization. Through this alliance, BeyGood has supported disaster relief, food distribution, housing assistance, and other charitable work.

Other notable nonprofit partners have included UNICEF, the NAACP, and the National Minority Supplier Development Council (NMSDC). Since 2023, NMSDC has supported BeyGood’s work with Black-owned businesses by providing business development services and minority-owned enterprise certification.

=== Corporate partners ===
In 2024, BeyGood partnered with Beyoncé’s haircare brand Cécred to launch the Cécred x BeyGOOD Fund, which awards annual scholarships to cosmetology students and business grants to salon and barbershop owners. As of April 2026, the fund had awarded $1 million to 133 students and salon owners. Other corporate partners have included Google, Adidas and Tiffany & Co.

== Programs and campaigns ==
=== Education ===
Education forms a core pillar of BeyGood’s work and is viewed as a key pathway to economic equity. The foundation has developed scholarships, fellowships, school-supply campaigns, and other educational programs that support students from disadvantaged backgrounds. Many of these focus on historically Black colleges and universities (HBCUs).

In 2014, BeyGood teamed with STATE Bags to launch the #BeyGOODxSTATE GIVEBACKPACK campaign, which provided more than 2,000 free backpacks and school supplies to students in underfunded communities. The project featured high‑energy pep rallies followed by a simulated shopping experience in which children could fill their new backpacks with essential items. The events were designed to provide young people with role models and motivation. Additionally, a limited‑edition #BeyGOOD x STATE Bags backpack was sold, with all proceeds supporting the campaign.

During the Formation World Tour in 2016, BeyGood awarded $1,000 each to fourteen Detroit high‑school students toward college expenses, and arranged surprise concert tickets for the recipients. The following year, BeyGood launched the Formation Scholars Award to mark the one‑year anniversary of Beyoncé's Lemonade. The program supported young women pursuing creative arts, music, literature, or African‑American studies during the 2017–2018 academic year. Four students each received $25,000 scholarships at Howard University, Spelman College, Berklee College of Music, and Parsons School of Design.

After Beyoncé performed at Coachella in 2018, BeyGood introduced the Homecoming Scholars program to support students at historically Black colleges and universities. It awarded $25,000 scholarships to one student each at Xavier, Wilberforce, Tuskegee, and Bethune-Cookman. A partnership with Google.org later expanded the program to include Fisk, Texas Southern, Grambling State and Morehouse, bringing the total to eight recipients. That same year, during the On the Run II Tour, BeyGood introduced the OTRII Scholars program, providing $100,000 to eleven high-school seniors. The grants totaled $1.1 million and supported recipients through college beginning in 2018–2019.

In 2019, BeyGood, Global Citizen, and Tyler Perry launched the Global Citizen Fellowship in South Africa. The multi-year paid program offered training in advocacy, problem-solving, critical thinking, community building, and global citizenship, along with mentoring from industry professionals. It focused on developing leadership skills among young people. The fellowship later expanded to Nigeria and Kenya and, over four years, supported 50 young leaders.

In 2021, BeyGood, Tiffany & Co., and the Shawn Carter Foundation launched the ABOUT LOVE Scholarship, providing $2 million to students at five HBCUs—Lincoln University, Norfolk State University, Bennett College, the University of Arkansas at Pine Bluff, and Central State University. The funding supported students in creative fields, history, and communications, with priority given to those facing financial hardship. Tiffany & Co. later directed all profits from its “Return to Tiffany x Beyoncé” jewelry collection to the program. That same year, Beyoncé and Lorraine Schwartz established the Beyoncé Knowles-Carter x Lorraine Schwartz GIA Scholarship, awarding three full scholarships worth more than $20,000 each for the Gemological Institute of America’s Graduate Gemologist diploma.

During the Renaissance World Tour in 2023, BeyGood launched the Renaissance Scholars program, giving $1 million to colleges and universities in ten cities along the tour route. Each institution received $100,000 and selected its own student recipients.

In 2024, BeyGood partnered with Cécred to launch the Cécred x BeyGOOD Fund, supporting cosmetology and barbering education in Atlanta, Chicago, Houston, Los Angeles, and New Jersey—cities chosen for their large and diverse communities of hairstylists. The fund awarded $10,000 scholarships to each of 25 students, totaling $250,000. Later that year, BeyGood also donated $100,000 to the University of Houston Law Center’s Criminal Justice Clinic.

The Cécred x BeyGOOD Fund expanded nationwide in 2025 and awarded $130,000 in scholarships across five schools. BeyGood also donated $100,000 to Texas Southern University’s Ocean of Soul marching band. In April 2026, the Cécred x BeyGOOD Fund expanded internationally, providing $250,000 in scholarships across ten cosmetology and barbering institutions in the United States and the United Kingdom.

In October 2026, BeyGood donated $50,000 to In A Perfect World to support its youth education, leadership, and development programs. The same month, it provided $25,000 to Camp HBCYouth, a Houston program that introduces elementary school students to Historically Black Colleges and Universities. In November 2026, BeyGood awarded $20,000 to the Houston-based HYPE Freedom School's Book Buddies program, which pairs younger scholars with teen volunteers for literacy support and mentoring.. Later that month, it awarded a $50,000 grant to Reach, Incorporated, which empowers teens through literacy and mentorship programs.

=== Entrepreneurship and employment ===
BeyGood has supported job training programs, small business grants, and entrepreneurship as part of its focus on economic equity.

During the Mrs. Carter Show World Tour in 2013, BeyGood partnered with Goodwill Industries on donation drives that supported the organization’s work programs. The summer phase of the campaign collected 27,500 pounds (14 tons) of clothes and goods—equivalent to more than 800 hours of free on‑the‑job training at Goodwill career centers. Fans were again encouraged to donate during the tour’s second North American leg later that year, with collection bins at concert venues and incentives for early donors.

In 2020, BeyGood introduced the Black Parade Route to spotlight and support Black businesses affected by the COVID‑19 pandemic. This included a directory of Black‑owned businesses and a partnership with the NAACP to create the Black‑Owned Small Business Impact Fund. The program, which offered $10,000 grants, was created in response to the disparities Black businesses faced in accessing pandemic‑related financial support. On Juneteenth, Beyoncé released the single “Black Parade,” directing all proceeds to the fund, and later donated an additional $1 million. By the end of 2020, 715 grants totaling $7.15 million had been awarded and more than 900 businesses supported globally.

In 2022, BeyGood partnered with Adidas on a U.S. internship program that provided students with professional work experience at the company. Following Hurricanes Ian and Nicole later that year, BeyGood worked with the African American Chamber of Commerce of Central Florida to provide grants to 100 storm-affected small businesses in the region.

BeyGood continued the Black Parade Route during the Renaissance World Tour in 2023—providing $1 million in relief grants to more than 1000 Black small businesses across ten cities: Lagos, São Paulo, London, Los Angeles, Charlotte, New York, Atlanta, Houston, New Orleans, and Chicago. Grants were typically $10,000, and recipients were honored at Black Parade Route Small Business Luncheons, which offered business support and advice.

In 2024, BeyGood launched the Black Equestrian program in partnership with the Bill Pickett Invitational Rodeo, allocating $500,000 to support Black cowboys, cowgirls, farmers, and ranchers. The Cécred x BeyGOOD Fund distributed $250,000 in business grants in 2024 and $370,000 in 2025, supporting a total of 62 salon and barbershop owners across the United States.

=== Health and community support ===
BeyGood has undertaken a range of health, humanitarian, and community initiatives, including food distribution and other essential aid.

In 2014, BeyGood co‑hosted a Houston food drive with Bread of Life, Miss‑A‑Meal, the Houston Food Bank, and local radio partners. The event collected non‑perishable items for local families, and later that year the organization provided Thanksgiving turkeys to 250 households in need.

In 2015, Beyoncé traveled to Haiti with the United Nations to view progress since the 2010 earthquake and meet people affected by the disaster. During the visit she participated in the distribution of food, water, and medical supplies, and also visited Saint Damien Pediatric Hospital—the country’s only children’s hospital—where she met with doctors, cancer patients, and newborns in specialized intensive care. In response to the hospital’s funding needs, BeyGood teamed up with Teespring to sell limited‑edition T‑shirts, with all proceeds benefiting the hospital. The campaign raised millions of dollars and was relaunched later that year for World Humanitarian Day.

In 2016, during the Formation World Tour, BeyGood encouraged fans to donate for the Flint water crisis, offering seat upgrades as incentives. The campaign raised $82,234, with the funds used for filtration pitchers, faucet‑mount filters, replacement cartridges, and bottled water. The same year, the foundation encouraged fans to volunteer with United Way on projects including school-supply backpack assembly, diaper donations, and food aid. BeyGood later partnered with the Shawn Carter Foundation on holiday toy distributions and continued seasonal meal support in Houston.

The following year, BeyGood launched #BeyGOOD4Burundi—a multi‑year partnership with UNICEF to expand access to safe water and hygiene in remote areas of Burundi (where contaminated water contributed to disease and malnutrition among children). By the end of 2018, 25 protected wells with hand pumps, 20 improved springs, and two large water‑supply schemes had been built or rehabilitated for 84 communities in Cankuzo, Rutana and Ruyigi, benefiting 31,586 people (including around 15,800 children). BeyGood also released two limited‑edition shirts to raise money for the project.

During the COVID-19 pandemic, BeyGood donated $6 million in April 2020 toward mental health and wellness services for essential workers, highlighting the disproportionate impact of the virus on communities of color. Later that month, proceeds from Beyoncé’s feature on the “Savage” remix supported Bread of Life’s relief efforts in Houston. In early May, BeyGood and Tina Knowles-Lawson launched the #IDIDMYPART campaign, which provided free drive-through COVID-19 testing in Houston in response to the virus’s heavier toll on African-American communities. Approximately 1,000 tests were administered, and participants received personal protective equipment, household supplies, vitamins, a BeyGood grocery gift card redeemable at H-E-B, and meal vouchers for Frenchy’s Chicken and Burns Original Bar-B-Q. Additional supplies were provided by partners including Matthew 25 Ministries and Procter & Gamble. The initiative later expanded to other cities through celebrity collaborations, including Atlanta (Tyler Perry), Mississippi (Octavia Spencer), Detroit (Magic Johnson), and Seattle. Later in 2020, BeyGood launched its COVID‑19 Housing Assistance Fund, which distributed $500,000 in $5,000 grants to 100 individuals and families across the United States facing eviction or foreclosure.

In 2023, BeyGood provided funding for the Human Rights Campaign Foundation’s first‑ever Equality Ball in Las Vegas, an event that celebrated Black queer and ballroom culture and offered on‑site HIV testing and other support.

=== Disaster relief ===
BeyGood has undertaken disaster-relief and recovery efforts across multiple regions.

In 2016, BeyGood participated in “Love on Louisiana”, a fundraising dinner that sought to raise $1 million for Baton Rouge flood recovery. After Hurricane Harvey in 2017, BeyGood supported relief efforts in Houston through a partnership with Bread of Life and other local organizations. The foundation helped identify families in need, secure temporary housing, and replace essential belongings, and also contributed funds for long‑term revitalization. Support included cleaning products, blankets, diapers, feminine care items, and a donation of $75,000 worth of new mattresses. Beyoncé and the BeyGood team traveled to Houston to assist with on‑the‑ground relief, sponsoring a lunch for 400 survivors and visiting people stranded at the George R. Brown Convention Center.

During Winter Storm Uri in 2021, BeyGood partnered with Adidas and Bread of Life to provide one‑time grants of up to $1,000 to affected individuals, and collaborated with Trae Tha Truth’s Relief Gang to distribute water and meals in Houston. In 2022, the foundation expanded its disaster‑relief work by partnering with Adidas, Amazon, and Matthew 25: Ministries to host a hurricane‑relief supplies distribution in Orlando for residents impacted by Hurricane Ian.

In January 2025, BeyGood established the LA Fire Relief Fund in response to the Southern California wildfires. The foundation committed $3.5 million to recovery efforts in Altadena and Pasadena, including more than $3 million in direct cash assistance to over 200 households and $500,000 for local groups. In collaboration with partner organizations, the foundation also distributed thousands of essential items—including gift certificates, kitchenware, appliances, clothing, technology, and toiletries—to help fire survivors restore daily necessities. Later in 2025, BeyGood partnered with WalkGood LA to raise approximately $150,000 for Jamaica hurricane relief following Hurricane Melissa. The foundation continued its disaster‑response work in 2026, donating $200,000 to support relief efforts after the August floods in Indiana. Beyoncé also made a personal $1 million donation for earthquake relief in Colombia.

=== Other activities ===
In 2018, BeyGood partnered with The Prince’s Trust and Global Citizen to launch the BeyGOOD/DoGood campaign during the On the Run II tour. The campaign encouraged fans in the United Kingdom and Europe to volunteer with participating charities, with selected volunteers receiving tickets to the tour’s stadium dates. BeyGood also supplied items for Global Citizen charity auctions, with proceeds supporting poverty‑reduction.

For the Renaissance World Tour in 2023, the BeyGood Foundation partnered with Citi and Verizon to distribute free tickets in each U.S. tour city to local groups, expanding access to the concerts for underserved communities.

== Funding ==
The BeyGood Foundation is funded primarily through contributions. These include personal donations from Beyoncé, such as her $1 million gift to the Black-Owned Small Business Impact Fund and a $2.5 million contribution to the LA Fire Relief Fund. Additional funding comes from merchandise sales and fundraising campaigns, including T-shirt sales for Haiti relief and fan donations that raised more than $82,000 for the Flint water crisis. The foundation has also received support from corporate partners, including a $1 million donation from Gucci for the #BeyGOOD4Burundi water project. It also generates income from investments.

== Recognition ==
In 2016, Beyoncé was named the most charitable celebrity of the year by DoSomething.org on its Celebs Gone Good list—highlighting her support for education and the Flint water crisis through BeyGood. In 2020, she was presented with the BET Humanitarian Award by former First Lady Michelle Obama in recognition of her philanthropy, including work associated with BeyGood. In 2026, she was included in Town & Country’s Philanthropists of the Year list.
