= Nicky Kinnaird =

Irish business executive

Nicky Kinnaird MBE is the Belfast-born founder and president of British cosmetic retailer Space NK. Kinnaird's initials, NK, make up the end part of the company's name. She attended the University of Reading, and was named Alumnus of the Year in 2009 for her industry achievements. After starting her career in real estate, she founded Space NK. In 2007, she sold a 90% stake of Space NK to a private equity house for an undisclosed sum. In 2014, she stepped down from her role at Space NK to set up her own brand consultancy. She serves as a non-executive director on the board of Debenhams and on the board at Lumity.

She was appointed Member of the Order of the British Empire (MBE) in the 2009, New Year Honours.

== Bibliography ==
- "Awaken Your Senses" by Nicky Kinnaird 2002 ISBN 1-903845-83-1
