= Beyoncé =

American singer and songwriter (born 1981)

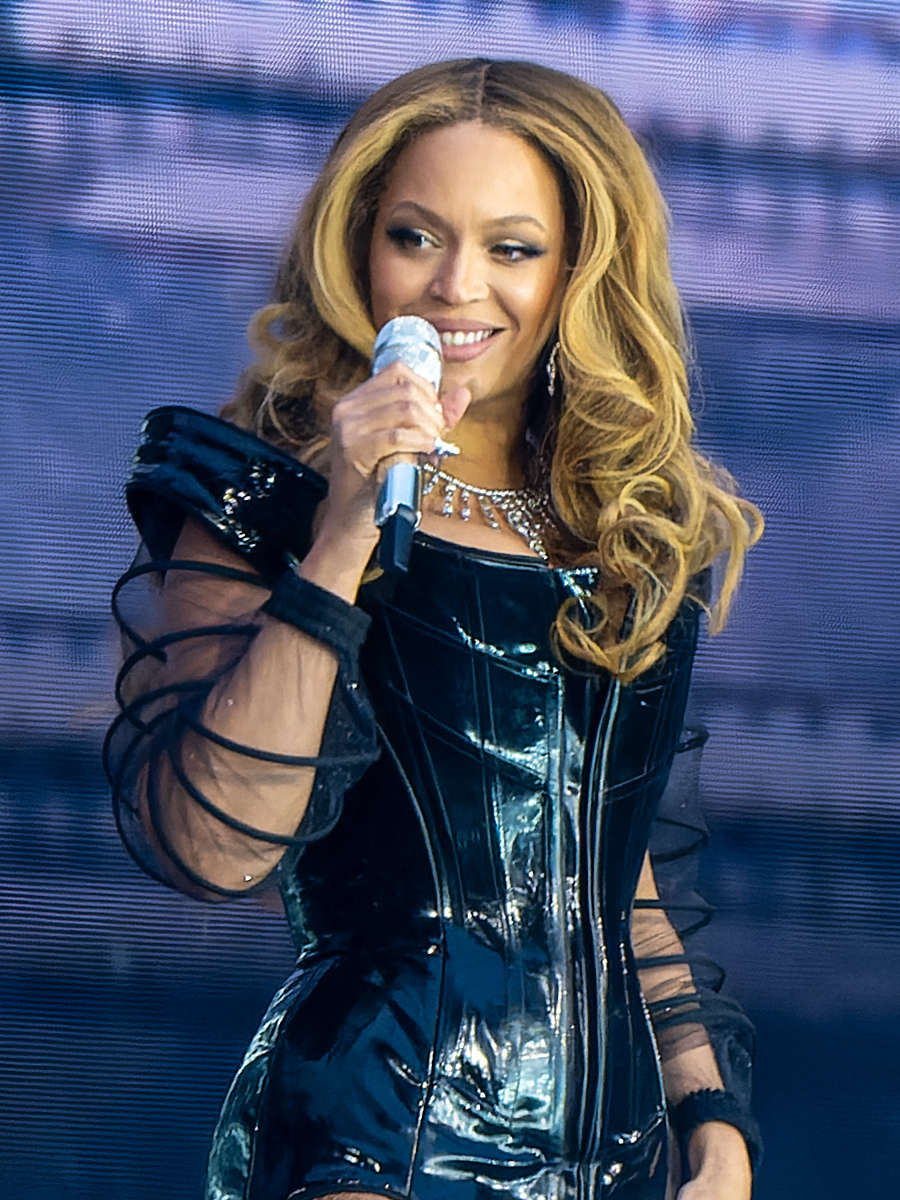
- Beyoncé in 2023
- Born: Beyoncé Giselle Knowles; September 4, 1981 (age 45); Houston, Texas, US
- Other names: Harmonies by the Hive; Queen Bey; Queen B; Third Ward Trill
- Occupations: Singer; songwriter; actress; businesswoman
- Years active: 1990–present
- Organizations: BeyGood; Parkwood Entertainment; Ivy Park; Cécred; SirDavis
- Works: Albums (Note: For her works with Destiny's Child and the Carters, see Destiny's Child discography, List of songs recorded by Destiny's Child and the Carters discography.); singles; songs; videos; performances
- Spouse: Jay-Z (m. 2008)
- Children: 3, including Blue Ivy
- Parents: Mathew Knowles; Tina Knowles
- Relatives: Solange Knowles (sister)
- Awards: Full list
- Musical career
- Genres: R&B; pop; hip-hop
- Instrument: Vocals
- Labels: Parkwood; Columbia; Music World
- Member of: The Carters
- Formerly of: Destiny's Child
- Website: beyonce.com

Beyoncé Giselle Knowles-Carter (/biˈɒnseɪ/ bee-ON-say; born September 4, 1981) is an American singer, songwriter, actress, and businesswoman. Known for her vocal ability, artistic reinventions, and live performances, she is widely regarded as one of the most culturally significant figures of the 21st century. Credited with shaping popular music, Beyoncé is often deemed one of the greatest entertainers of all time.

Beyoncé rose to fame in the late 1990s as the lead singer of Destiny's Child, one of the best-selling girl groups in history. Her debut solo album, Dangerously in Love (2003), became one of the best-selling albums of the 21st century. After Destiny's Child disbanded in 2005, Beyoncé released the funk-imbued B'Day (2006) and starred in the drama film Dreamgirls (2006). Her marriage to rapper Jay-Z and portrayal of Etta James in the biopic Cadillac Records (2008) influenced her pop-oriented double album I Am... Sasha Fierce (2008). Through the 2000s, Beyoncé garnered the US Billboard Hot 100 number-one singles "Crazy in Love", "Baby Boy", "Check on It", "Irreplaceable", and "Single Ladies (Put a Ring on It)".

After forming the management company Parkwood Entertainment, Beyoncé embraced traditional R&B and soul on 4 (2011). The electronic-influenced Beyoncé (2013) popularized surprise and visual albums, inspiring the setting of Friday as Global Release Day, while the eclectic Lemonade (2016) sparked sociopolitical discourse and was the best-selling album of 2016. Her ongoing trilogy project—consisting of the queer-inspired dance album Renaissance (2022) and the Americana-rooted country record Cowboy Carter (2024)—has highlighted the overlooked contributions of Black pioneers to American musical and cultural history, spawning the respective US number-one singles "Break My Soul" and "Texas Hold 'Em".

Beyoncé is one of the best-selling music artists of all time, with estimated sales of over 200 million records. She is the most-certified female artist by the Recording Industry Association of America and the only woman whose first eight studio albums each debuted atop the US Billboard 200. One of the most-awarded artists in popular music, she is the recipient of a record 35 Grammy Awards, 30 MTV Video Music Awards, a Primetime Emmy Award, and a Peabody Award. Beyoncé is the most-awarded artist of the BET Awards (36), NAACP Image Awards (32), and Soul Train Music Awards (25). The first woman to headline an all-stadium tour, she is the highest-grossing Black live music artist.

== Life and career ==
=== Early life ===
Beyoncé Giselle Knowles was born on September 4, 1981, in Houston, Texas. Her mother, Tina Knowles (née Beyoncé), was a hairdresser and salon owner, while her father, Mathew Knowles, was a sales manager at Xerox. Mathew is African-American, while Tina is Louisiana Creole with African, French, Irish, Breton, Norman, and Native American ancestry. Beyoncé's younger sister, Solange, is also a singer and actress. They are descendants of Acadian militia officer Joseph Broussard, who was exiled to French Louisiana after the expulsion of the Acadians. Both sisters also have Belgian ancestry from Hainaut Province, Wallonia.

Beyoncé was raised within multiple religious traditions, attending both St. John's United Methodist Church and St. Mary of the Purification Catholic Church in Houston. Her first job was as a child, sweeping hair at her mother's hair salon, where she occasionally performed for customers. Beyoncé began her education at St. Mary's Catholic Montessori School, where she also took dance classes. Her vocals were discovered by her dance instructor, who began humming a song that Beyoncé completed.

Beyoncé's interest in music and performing grew after she won a school talent show at the age of seven by singing John Lennon's "Imagine", winning against older competitors aged fifteen and sixteen. In 1990, a nine-year-old Beyoncé enrolled in Parker Elementary School, a music magnet school in Houston, where she performed with the school's choir. She later attended the Kinder High School for the Performing and Visual Arts and subsequently Alief Elsik High School. Beyoncé was also a member of the choir at St. John's United Methodist Church, where she sang her first solo and was a soloist for two years.

=== 1990–2001: Early career and Destiny's Child ===
In 1990, Beyoncé met singer LaTavia Roberson while at an audition for an all-girl entertainment group. Joined by Kelly Rowland two years later, the trio was placed in Girl's Tyme, a group that performed rap and dance routines on Houston's talent show circuit. In 1993, the group was entered in Star Search, the largest national talent show on television at the time. Competing in the show's singing category, the group lost the competition, which Beyoncé attributed to a poor song choice. After LeToya Luckett joined in 1993, Girl's Tyme continued performing as an opening act for established R&B girl groups.

In 1995, Mathew left his job to manage the group, which halved the Knowles family's income, leading to them moving into separate apartments. The group was briefly signed by Elektra Records and later dropped. Ensuing tensions led to a six-month separation of Beyoncé's parents. The Knowles family later reunited and the group secured a contract with Columbia Records, aided by talent scout Teresa LaBarbera Whites.

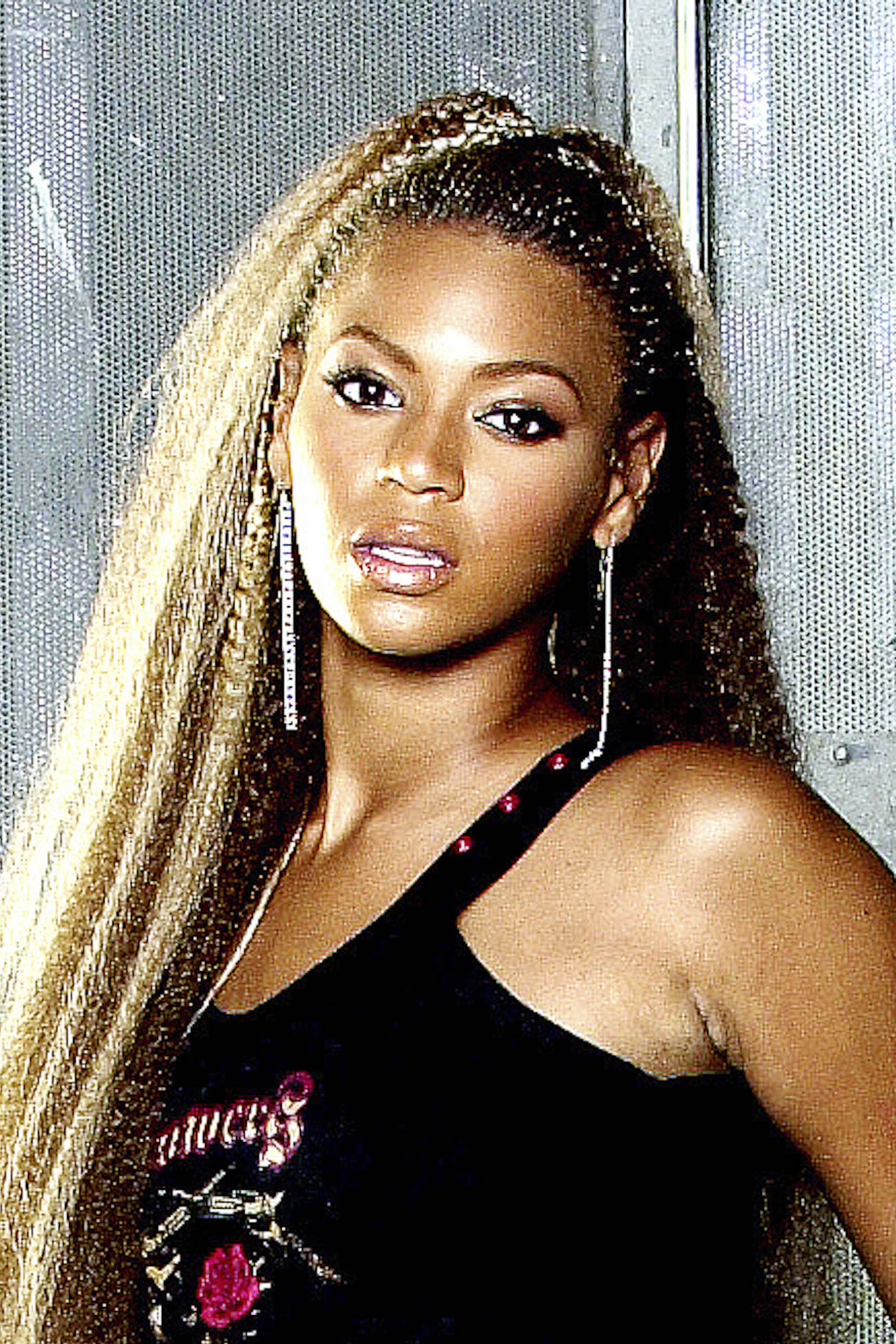
Beyoncé in 2001

The group adopted the name Destiny's Child in 1996, based upon a passage in the Book of Isaiah. In 1997, following their inclusion on the soundtrack for the film Men in Black, they released their debut single and first major hit, "No, No, No", which preceded their debut album, Destiny's Child (1998), a moderate success. The group's second album, The Writing's on the Wall, was released in July 1999 and peaked at number five on the US Billboard 200, later achieving multi-platinum status in the country. The record spawned the singles "Bills, Bills, Bills", "Say My Name", and "Jumpin', Jumpin'"; the first two both peaked atop the US Billboard Hot 100. "Say My Name" won Best R&B Performance by a Duo or Group with Vocals and Best R&B Song at the 2001 Grammy Awards. The Writing's on the Wall became one of the best-selling R&B albums of all time, having sold 13 million copies worldwide.

Following several lineup changes, Destiny's Child's final lineup comprised Beyoncé, Rowland, and Michelle Williams. In early 2001, while the group was completing work on their third album, Beyoncé secured a leading role in the MTV made-for-television film Carmen: A Hip Hopera, an interpretation of the 19th-century opera Carmen. Destiny's Child's third studio album, Survivor, was released in May 2001; it debuted at number one on the Billboard 200, selling 663,000 copies in its first week. The album produced the Billboard Hot 100 number-ones "Independent Woman Part I" and "Bootylicious", as well as the title track, which peaked at number two. "Survivor" earned the group a Grammy Award for Best R&B Performance by a Duo or Group with Vocals. Following the release of their holiday album 8 Days of Christmas (2001), Destiny's Child announced a hiatus to allow each member to pursue solo careers.

=== 2002–2007: Dangerously in Love and B'Day ===
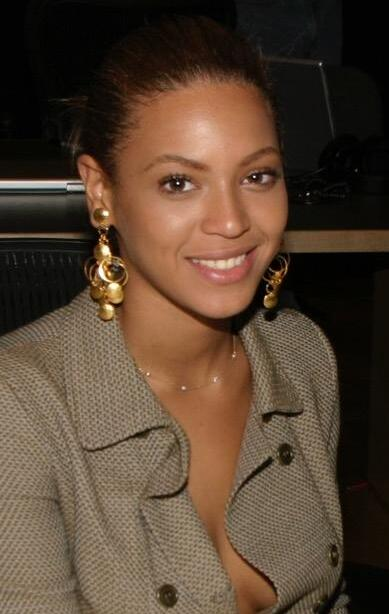
Beyoncé in 2004

In July 2002, Beyoncé made her theatrical film debut, portraying Foxxy Cleopatra in Austin Powers in Goldmember. She released "Work It Out" as the lead single from the film's soundtrack. Her breakthrough as a solo artist came when she featured on Jay-Z's track "'03 Bonnie & Clyde" from his album The Blueprint 2: The Gift & The Curse (2002). The single peaked at number four on the Billboard Hot 100. Beyoncé appeared as Jay-Z's girlfriend in the music video for the song, fueling speculation about a relationship. She later shared that they began dating when she was nineteen, after a year and a half of friendship.

In May 2003, Beyoncé released "Crazy in Love", the lead single from her debut solo studio album, Dangerously in Love. The song featured Jay-Z and became Beyoncé's first number-one single as a solo artist on the US Billboard Hot 100, topping the chart for eight consecutive weeks. On June 14, 2003, she premiered songs from Dangerously in Love during her first solo concert, which was broadcast as a pay-per-view television special. Released ten days later, the album debuted at number one on the Billboard 200, selling 317,000 copies in its first week. The second single, "Baby Boy", spent nine consecutive weeks atop the Billboard Hot 100; "Me, Myself and I" and "Naughty Girl" both peaked within the top five. Dangerously in Love earned Beyoncé five awards at the 46th Annual Grammy Awards, including Best Contemporary R&B Album and Best R&B Song for "Crazy in Love". One of the best-selling albums of the 21st century, Dangerously in Love has sold more than 11 million copies globally.

Beyoncé starred alongside Cuba Gooding Jr. in the musical comedy The Fighting Temptations (2003), portraying a single mother and the love interest of Gooding's character. In November 2003, she embarked on the European Dangerously in Love Tour and North American Verizon Ladies First Tour alongside Missy Elliott and Alicia Keys. On February 1, 2004, she performed "The Star-Spangled Banner", the national anthem of the US, at Super Bowl XXXVIII. In November 2004, Destiny's Child released their final album, titled Destiny Fulfilled. The record peaked at number two on the Billboard 200, spawning the US top-five singles "Lose My Breath" and "Soldier". In 2005, Destiny's Child embarked on a global concert tour titled Destiny Fulfilled... and Lovin' It. The group announced that they were disbanding at the end of the tour. Destiny's Child released their first compilation album, #1's, in October 2005 and were honored with a star on the Hollywood Walk of Fame in March 2006.

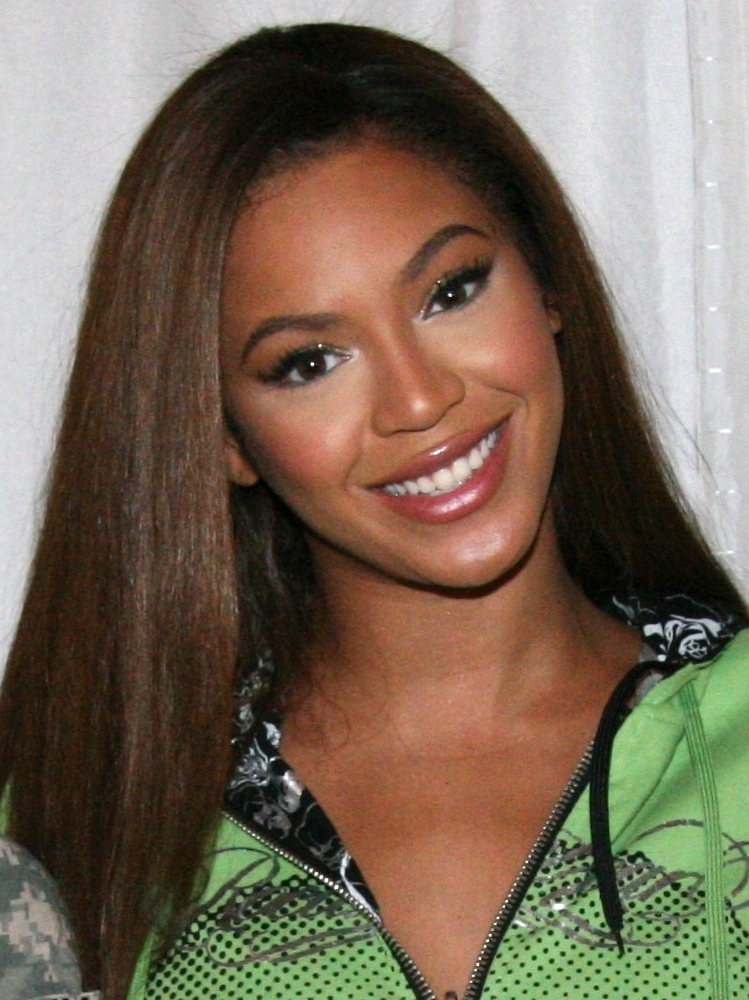
Beyoncé in 2007

Beyoncé released "Déjà Vu" featuring Jay-Z as the lead single from her second studio album, B'Day, in June 2006. The song reached number four on the Billboard Hot 100. B'Day was released internationally on September 4, 2006, to coincide with her twenty-fifth birthday. The album debuted at number one on the Billboard 200, with 541,000 copies sold in its first week. "Irreplaceable" was released as the second international single. The song topped the Billboard Hot 100 for ten consecutive weeks, becoming the best-performing chart hit of 2007. B'Day's other singles—"Ring the Alarm", "Get Me Bodied", and "Green Light"—each saw moderate chart success worldwide. At the 49th Annual Grammy Awards in 2007, B'Day and its songs received five nominations, winning Best Contemporary R&B Album. For the following year's awards, songs from the album garnered two more nominations, including Record of the Year for "Irreplaceable".

Since its release, B'Day has sold over eight million copies worldwide. With the comedy film The Pink Panther (2006) and its theme song, "Check on It", Beyoncé became the first woman to simultaneously have a number-one film and single in the US. "Check on It" was included on #1's and on the European deluxe version of B'Day, and peaked atop the Billboard Hot 100 for five consecutive weeks. Later that year, she starred in the drama film Dreamgirls, a cinematic adaptation of the 1981 Broadway musical, in which she portrayed a pop singer modeled after Diana Ross. In support of B'Day, Beyoncé embarked on the Beyoncé Experience in 2007, her first worldwide concert tour, which visited 97 venues. Simultaneously, the album was re-released with additional tracks, including the single "Beautiful Liar", a duet with Shakira, which peaked at number three in the US. In December 2007, Beyoncé and Jay-Z became engaged.

=== 2008–2010: I Am... Sasha Fierce and marriage ===
On April 4, 2008, Beyoncé and Jay-Z married in a small, private ceremony; the latter confirmed their marriage in an interview later that year. Their marriage served as a creative inspiration for her third studio album, I Am... Sasha Fierce. Released on November 12, 2008, I Am... Sasha Fierce formally introduced her alter ego Sasha Fierce. A double album, it comprises two discs—I Am... and Sasha Fierce; the former contains slow and midtempo pop and R&B ballads, while the latter focuses on uptempo beats that blend electropop and Europop elements. Selling 482,000 copies in its first week, it debuted atop the Billboard 200, marking Beyoncé's third consecutive US number-one album.

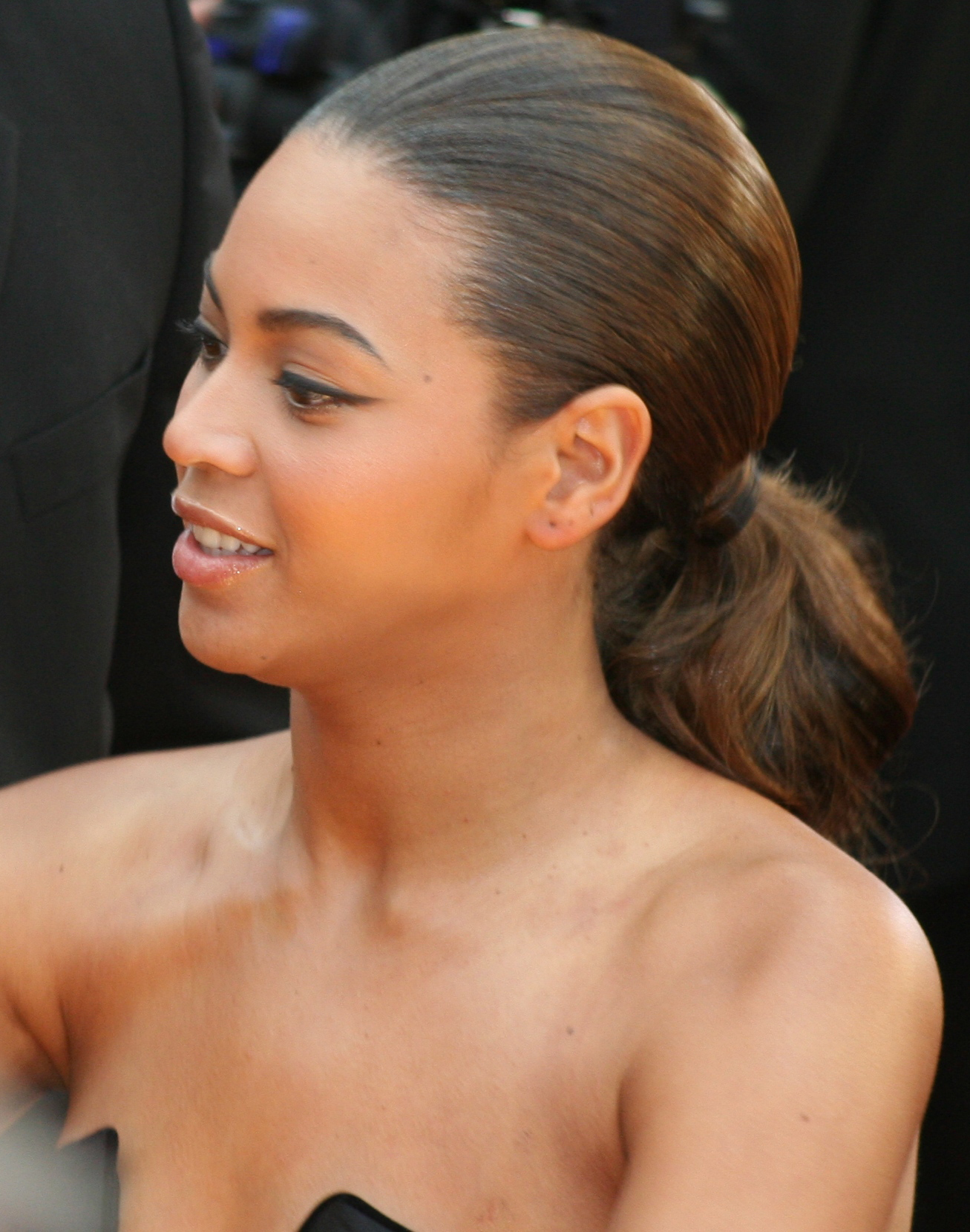
Beyoncé at the Academy Awards in 2009

I Am... Sasha Fierce included Beyoncé's fifth number-one on the Billboard Hot 100, "Single Ladies (Put a Ring on It)", as well as the UK chart-topping single, "If I Were a Boy". "Halo", which peaked at number five in the US, helped Beyoncé attain more top-ten singles on the list than any other woman during the 2000s. Parodied and imitated around the world, the "Single Ladies" music video was described by the Toronto Star as the "first major dance craze" of the Internet age. At the 2009 MTV Video Music Awards, the video won three categories, including Video of the Year. "Halo" and "Single Ladies" are both certified diamond by the Recording Industry Association of America.

Since its release, I Am... Sasha Fierce has sold more than 10 million copies worldwide. To promote I Am... Sasha Fierce, Beyoncé embarked on the worldwide I Am... Tour, her second headlining worldwide concert tour; it grossed $119.5 million. Beyoncé starred as blues singer Etta James in the musical biopic Cadillac Records (2008). Her portrayal garnered her an NAACP Image Award nomination for Outstanding Supporting Actress in a Motion Picture. In the psychological thriller Obsessed (2009), which co-starred Ali Larter and Idris Elba, Beyoncé played a woman protecting her family from her husband's stalker. The film was critically panned, but Beyoncé's acting saw favorable reception. Obsessed performed strongly at the US box office, earning $68 million on a $20 million budget.

Beyoncé performed "America the Beautiful" at President Barack Obama's 2009 presidential inauguration and "At Last" during the first inaugural dance. At the 52nd Annual Grammy Awards in 2010, she received ten nominations—both for I Am... Sasha Fierce and for her work in film soundtracks—tying with Lauryn Hill for most Grammy nominations in a single year by a female artist. Beyoncé won six of those nominations, including Best Contemporary R&B Album for I Am... Sasha Fierce and Song of the Year for "Single Ladies", breaking a record she previously tied in 2004 for the most Grammy Awards won in a single night by a female artist. In 2010, Beyoncé provided vocals on Lady Gaga's single "Telephone", from the latter's extended play The Fame Monster (2009). It peaked at number three on the Billboard Hot 100.

=== 2010–2012: 4 and first child ===
In January 2010, Beyoncé announced a hiatus from her music career. Over the nine-month break, she traveled to several European cities, the Great Wall of China, the Egyptian pyramids, Australia, and English music festivals, and attended museum exhibitions and ballet performances. "Eat, Play, Love", a cover story written by Beyoncé for Essence that detailed her career break, won her a writing award from the New York Association of Black Journalists. Around this time, she miscarried, retrospectively describing it as "the saddest thing" she had endured. Beyoncé returned to the studio and wrote music to cope with the loss. In September 2010, Beyoncé made her runway modelling debut at Tom Ford's Spring/Summer 2011 fashion show. In March 2011, her father Mathew stopped managing her career. A month later, during a photoshoot in Paris for her upcoming album cover, Beyoncé unexpectedly discovered she was pregnant.

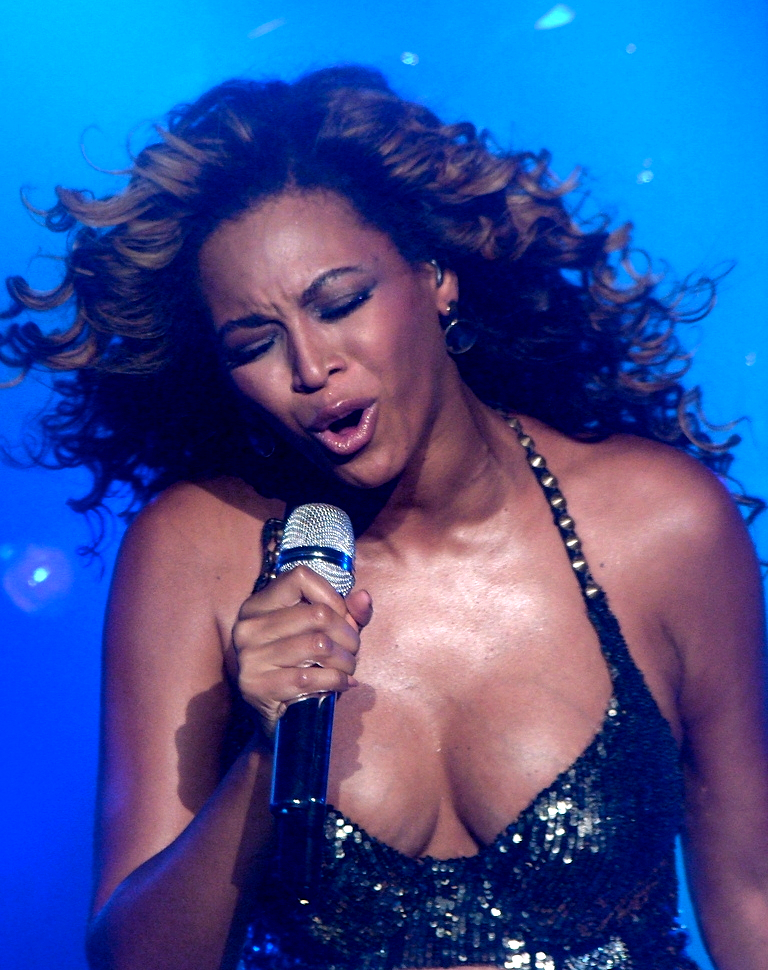
Beyoncé performing during her 4 Intimate Nights with Beyoncé concert residency in August 2011

Beyoncé's fourth studio album, 4, was released on June 24, 2011, in the US and debuted atop the Billboard 200, selling 310,000 copies in its first week. It was her fourth consecutive number-one album in the US. 4 marked Beyoncé’s first project made under her own creative direction following her split from her father. It was also her first album released through her management company, Parkwood Entertainment, and was conceived as a traditional R&B and soul record intended to stand apart from mainstream popular music. The songs "Run the World (Girls)", "Party", "Countdown", "Best Thing I Never Had", and "Love On Top" were released as singles in the US. The latter two peaked at numbers sixteen and twenty, respectively.

On June 26, 2011, Beyoncé became the first solo female artist in over two decades to headline the main Pyramid Stage at the Glastonbury Festival. The performance received praise from critics, with some outlets praising her growth as a live performer. In August 2011, Beyoncé and Jay-Z attended the MTV Video Music Awards, in which the former performed "Love On Top" and revealed her pregnancy. Her announcement contributed to the ceremony becoming the most-watched broadcast in MTV history at the time, drawing 12.4 million viewers. The moment also set a Guinness World Record for the most tweets per second for a single event, with 8,868 tweets per second, and "Beyonce pregnant" became the most Googled phrase during the week of August 29, 2011.

In August 2011, Beyoncé headlined four exclusive shows at New York's Roseland Ballroom titled 4 Intimate Nights with Beyoncé, performing songs from 4. That month, the album was certified platinum by the Recording Industry Association of America after shipping one million copies to retail stores. In February 2018, 4 made Beyoncé the first female artist to have three of her albums surpass one billion streams on Spotify. On January 7, 2012, Beyoncé gave birth to her first daughter, Blue Ivy Carter, in New York City. In June 2012, she performed for four nights at Revel Atlantic City's Ovation Hall to celebrate the resort's opening.

=== 2013–2014: Beyoncé and Super Bowl XLVII halftime show ===
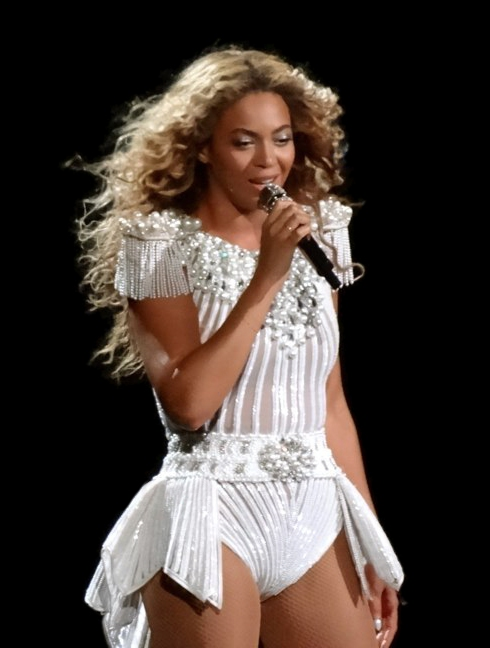
Beyoncé performing at the Mrs. Carter Show World Tour in 2014

In January 2013, Beyoncé performed the national anthem during Obama's second presidential inauguration. In February, she headlined the Super Bowl XLVII halftime show in New Orleans. The performance became the second most tweeted-about moment in history at the time, generating 268,000 tweets per minute. That same month, she co-directed and premiered her feature-length documentary Life Is But a Dream on HBO, which offered an introspective look into both her personal and professional life.

In April 2013, Beyoncé embarked on the Mrs. Carter Show World Tour, released a cover of Amy Winehouse's "Back to Black" with André 3000 for The Great Gatsby's soundtrack, and in May, voiced Queen Tara in the animated film Epic. On December 13, 2013, she unexpectedly released her fifth studio album, Beyoncé, on the iTunes Store without prior announcement or promotion. The album debuted at number one on the Billboard 200 chart, selling 617,000 copies in its first week. It marked her fifth consecutive US number-one debut, making her the first woman in the chart's history to achieve this milestone with her first five studio albums. The album received widespread critical acclaim, and sold one million digital copies globally within six days—a record for any album on iTunes at the time.

Musically rooted in electro-R&B, Beyoncé explored darker, more personal themes than her previous work, including bulimia, postnatal depression, and the emotional complexities of marriage and motherhood. As a visual album, the album's music videos were recorded in secrecy to accompany the album's unexpected release. Beyoncé is credited with helping popularize digital releases, as well as surprise and visual album formats; its release influenced the International Federation of the Phonographic Industry to adopt Friday as Global Release Day. The record spawned five singles: "Blow", "XO", "Drunk in Love", "Partition", and "Pretty Hurts". "Drunk in Love" featured Jay-Z and peaked at number two on the Billboard Hot 100. Beyoncé sold 2.3 million units worldwide by the end of 2013, making it one of the best-selling albums of the year.

At the 57th Annual Grammy Awards, Beyoncé received six nominations and won three: Best R&B Performance and Best R&B Song for "Drunk in Love", and Best Surround Sound Album for Beyoncé. In April 2014, Beyoncé and Jay-Z—known collectively by their stage name the Carters—announced their first co-headlining stadium tour called the On the Run Tour. On August 24, 2014, she received the Michael Jackson Video Vanguard Award at the MTV Video Music Awards, and won three additional honors: Best Video with a Social Message and Best Cinematography for "Pretty Hurts", and Best Collaboration for "Drunk in Love". The album was reissued as the Platinum Edition on November 24, 2014, featuring six additional songs.

=== 2015–2017: Lemonade and twins ===
Beyoncé released the single "Formation" on February 6, 2016, and performed it live for the first time during the Super Bowl 50 halftime show. The performance sparked controversy due to its perceived allusions to the Black Panther Party on its fiftieth anniversary, as the NFL prohibits political statements during its events. On April 16, 2016, Beyoncé released a teaser for a project titled Lemonade. An hour-long musical film and visual album premiered on HBO on April 23, coinciding with the release of the corresponding studio album of the same name exclusively on Tidal the same day.

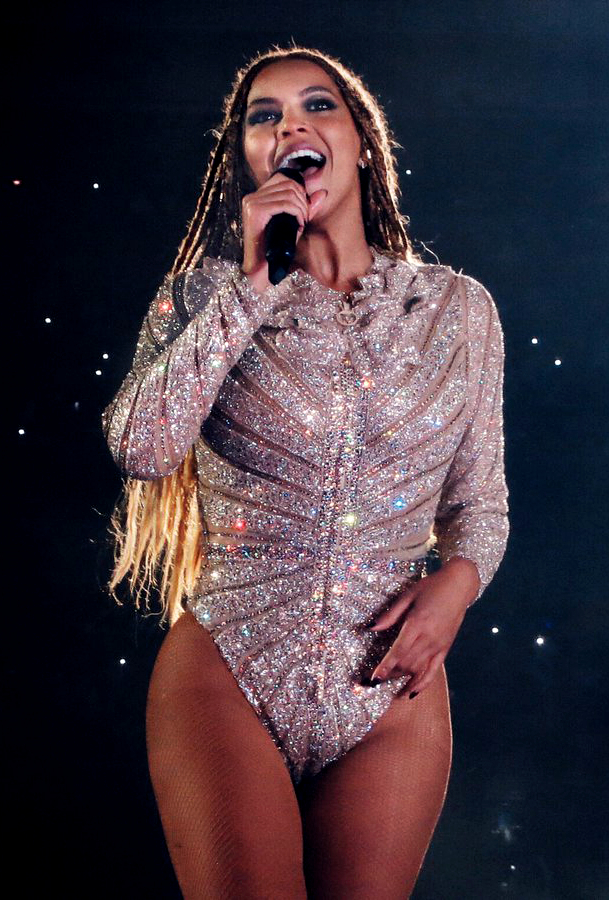
Beyoncé performing during the Formation World Tour in 2016

The album debuted at number one on the Billboard 200 and sold 653,000 copies in its first week. The number-one debut made Beyoncé the first artist in Billboard history to have her first six studio albums debut atop the chart. All twelve tracks from Lemonade entered the Billboard Hot 100, making her the first female artist to chart twelve songs simultaneously. After the album's release, "Sorry", "Hold Up", "Freedom", and "All Night" were released as singles. It was the third best-selling album in the US in 2016, with 1.554 million copies sold, and the best-selling album globally that year, with 2.5 million copies sold. Beyoncé embarked on the Formation World Tour from April to October 2016, with stops across North America and Europe. It was the first all-stadium tour by a female artist and received Tour of the Year at the 44th American Music Awards.

The album's visuals earned eleven nominations at the 2016 MTV Video Music Awards—the most Beyoncé had ever received in a single year—and won eight awards, including Video of the Year for "Formation". Beyoncé became the show's most-awarded artist with 24 total awards, surpassing Madonna's previous record of 20 wins. In January 2017, Beyoncé was announced as a headliner for the Coachella Valley Music and Arts Festival, which would have made her only the second female artist to headline the event. On February 23, it was confirmed that she was withdrawing from scheduled appearances due to her pregnancy. Festival organizers later announced Beyoncé was headlining the 2018 edition instead.

At the 59th Grammy Awards in February 2017, Lemonade led with nine nominations, including Album of the Year, and Record and Song of the Year for "Formation". Beyoncé won two awards: Best Urban Contemporary Album for Lemonade and Best Music Video for "Formation". That month, Beyoncé announced on Instagram that she was expecting twins. The post garnered over 6.3 million likes within a few hours, setting a world record for the most-liked image on the platform at the time. On July 13, she shared the first photo of herself with the twins, confirming they were born a month earlier on June 13. That post became the second most-liked on Instagram, following her original pregnancy announcement. The twins—a daughter, Rumi, and a son, Sir—were born via caesarean section in California. Later that year, Beyoncé featured on the remix of Ed Sheeran's "Perfect", which reached number one in the US, marking her sixth chart-topper as a solo artist.

=== 2018–2021: Everything Is Love, Homecoming and The Lion King ===
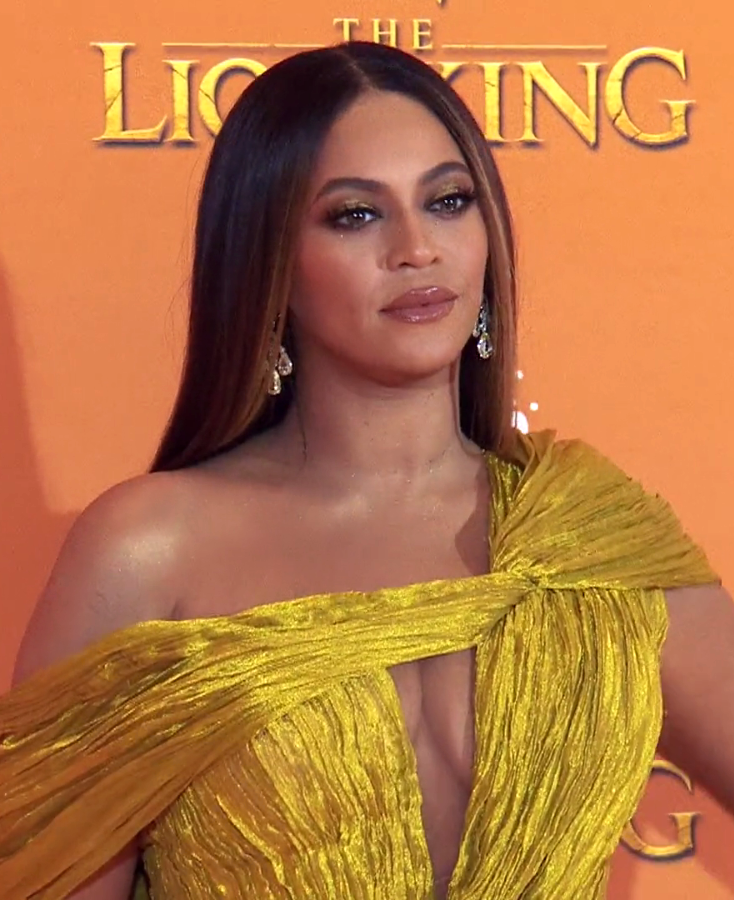
Beyoncé at the European premiere of The Lion King in 2019

Beyoncé headlined both weekends of the 2018 Coachella Valley Music and Arts Festival. Her performance on April 14 was the most-tweeted-about performance of the first weekend and became the most-watched live performance on YouTube. It received widespread praise from critics, many of whom described it as historic. The performance paid homage to Black culture—particularly focusing on historically Black colleges and universities—and included a brief reunion of Destiny's Child.

On June 6, 2018, Beyoncé and Jay-Z launched their On the Run II Tour. After its final show, the couple released their first collaborative studio album, Everything Is Love, on June 16. The record debuted at number two in the US with 123,000 album-equivalent units sold first-week; its only single, "Apeshit", peaked at number thirteen on the Billboard Hot 100. On December 2, 2018, Beyoncé and Jay-Z headlined the Global Citizen Festival: Mandela 100 at FNB Stadium in Johannesburg, South Africa. Homecoming: A Film by Beyoncé, a documentary and concert film chronicling the 2018 Coachella performances, was released on Netflix on April 17, 2019, alongside Homecoming: The Live Album. The film earned six nominations at the 71st Primetime Creative Arts Emmy Awards in 2019.

Beyoncé starred as the voice of Nala in the 2019 remake of The Lion King, released in July that year. She also contributed to the film's soundtrack, performing a remade version of "Can You Feel the Love Tonight". Beyoncé's original song "Spirit" was the lead single from both the official soundtrack and The Lion King: The Gift, a companion album she curated and produced. Incorporating gqom and Afrobeat, she recruited African producers to create The Gift, given the film's African setting. In September, ABC aired Beyoncé Presents: Making The Gift, a surprise documentary detailing the album's creation. In April 2020, Megan Thee Stallion and Beyoncé released a remix of the former's song "Savage", which topped the Billboard Hot 100, becoming Beyoncé's seventh number-one as a soloist.

In July 2020, Beyoncé released Black Is King, the visual companion to The Gift, which she wrote, directed, and executive produced. At the 63rd Annual Grammy Awards in 2021, she led with nine nominations and won four awards, making her the most-awarded singer and woman in Grammy history, and the second most-awarded person overall. That same year, she co-wrote and recorded "Be Alive" for the biographical sports drama film King Richard, earning her first Academy Award nomination for Best Original Song at the 94th Academy Awards.

=== 2022–present: Renaissance and Cowboy Carter ===
On June 16, 2022, Beyoncé announced the title of her seventh studio album, Renaissance. The album's lead single, "Break My Soul", was released four days later and peaked atop the Billboard Hot 100, becoming Beyoncé's eighth number-one and twentieth top-ten song on the chart. This placed her alongside Paul McCartney and Michael Jackson as the only artists in chart history to earn at least twenty top-ten singles as solo acts and ten as members of a group.

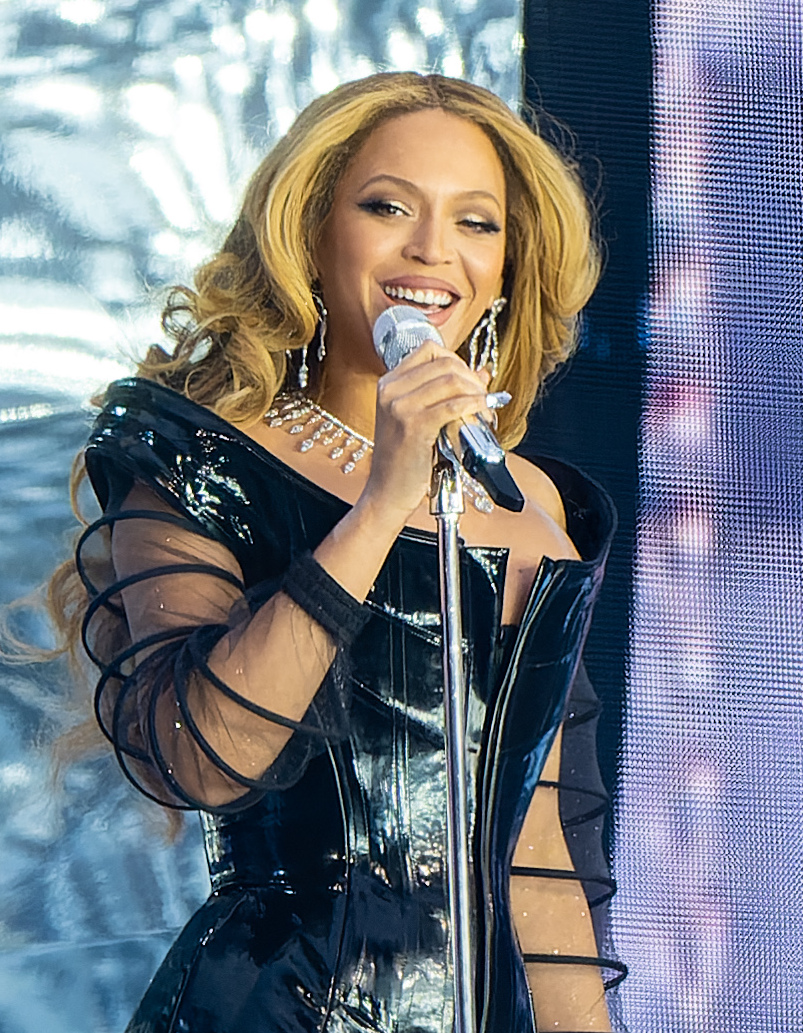
Beyoncé performing at the Renaissance World Tour in 2023

Renaissance was released on July 29, 2022, to universal acclaim from critics. The album features Black dance music styles such as disco and house and largely pays homage to the historically overlooked contributions of Black queer pioneers to those genres. The album debuted atop the Billboard 200, with 332,000 copies sold in its first week. Its number-one debut made Beyoncé the first female artist to have her first seven studio albums debut at number one in the US. All of its sixteen songs charted on the Hot 100; its second single, "Cuff It", peaked at number six and became her longest-charting song on the chart. Upon the release of Renaissance, Beyoncé revealed that it was the first installment of a trilogy developed and recorded during the COVID-19 pandemic—a period she described as her "most creative".

On January 21, 2023, Beyoncé performed for an audience of influencers and journalists at a private event in Dubai. It was her first full concert in over four years, and she was reportedly paid $24 million for the show, which sparked criticism due to the United Arab Emirates' laws criminalizing homosexuality. She then began the Renaissance World Tour across the US and Europe, which became the highest-grossing tour by a woman at the time. In November 2023, she released Renaissance: A Film by Beyoncé, a documentary concert film that chronicled the tour's creation. She wrote, directed, and produced the film in partnership with AMC Theatres. She won four of her nine nominations at the 65th Annual Grammy Awards, making her the most-awarded person in Grammy history.

On February 11, 2024, Beyoncé announced the second installment of her trilogy project and released its first two singles, "Texas Hold 'Em" and "16 Carriages". The former became her ninth number-one on the Billboard Hot 100 and her first on the Billboard Global 200. On March 12, 2024, she announced the album's title, Cowboy Carter, releasing it to universal acclaim on March 29. Infused with Americana musical styles, Cowboy Carter highlights the historically overlooked contributions of Black pioneers to country music. It debuted at number one on the Billboard 200, making Beyoncé the only female artist to debut her first eight studio albums at number one in the US, with 407,000 copies sold in its first week. The album's third single, "II Most Wanted", featuring Miley Cyrus, debuted at number six in the US.

In July 2024, NBC released two promotional commercials featuring Beyoncé for their coverage of the 2024 Summer Olympics in Paris. She returned as Nala in Mufasa: The Lion King (2024), a prequel to the 2019 remake. In December 2024, she headlined the first-ever NFL Christmas Gameday Halftime Show, debuting songs from Cowboy Carter. At the 67th Annual Grammy Awards in 2025, she became the first Black artist in 50 years to win in the country categories, and the first Black artist to win Best Country Album. She also won Album of the Year, the first Black woman to do so in 26 years. That year, Beyoncé embarked on the Cowboy Carter Tour across the US and Europe, which went on to become the highest-grossing country tour of all time.

After her longest musical hiatus to date, Beyoncé surprise-released "Morning Dew (Donk)" in July 2026. The song was the lead single to the twentieth-anniversary edition of her second studio album, B'Day (2006), which was released on September 4, 2026, and contained unreleased tracks.

== Artistry ==
=== Influences ===
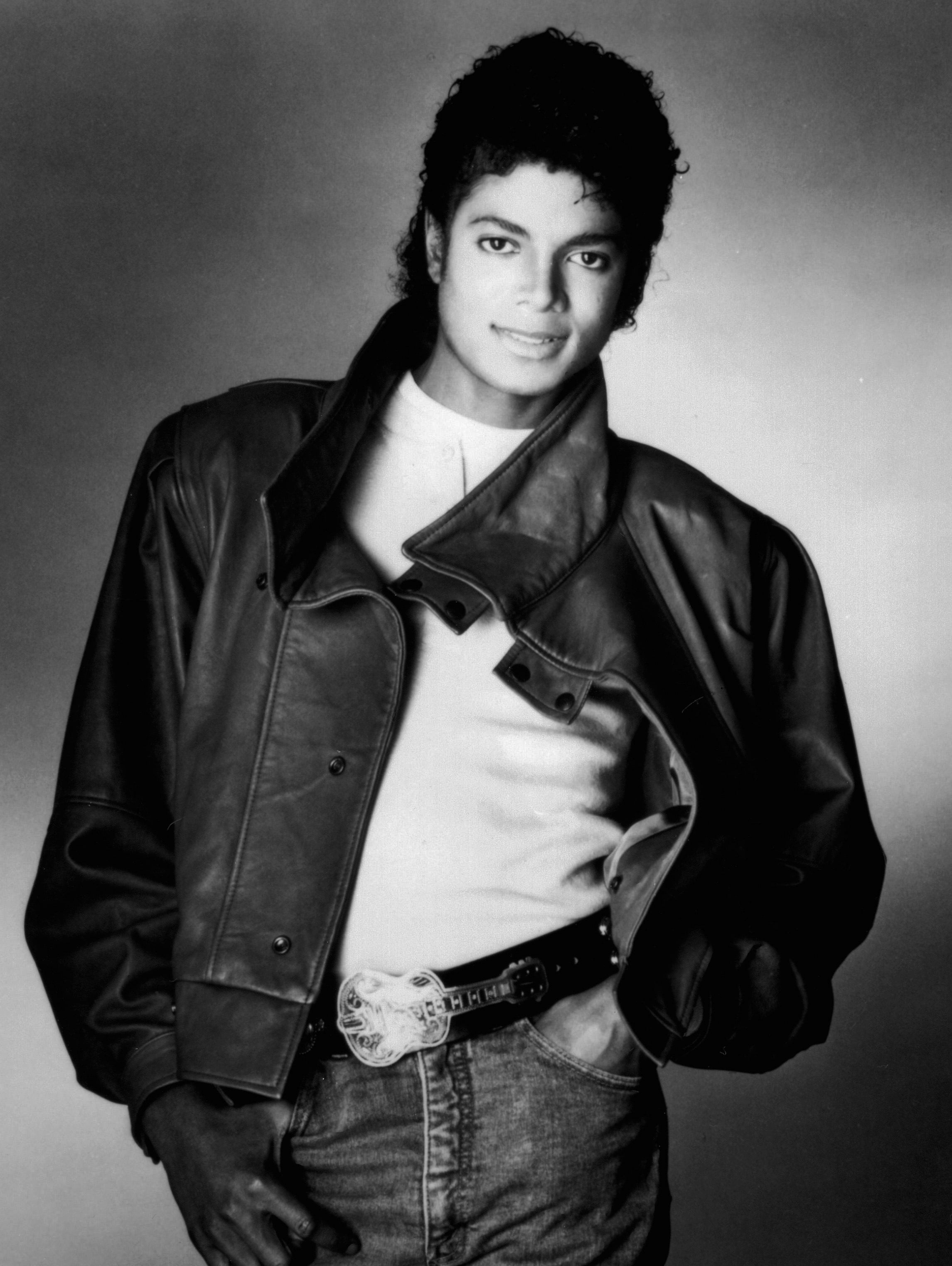
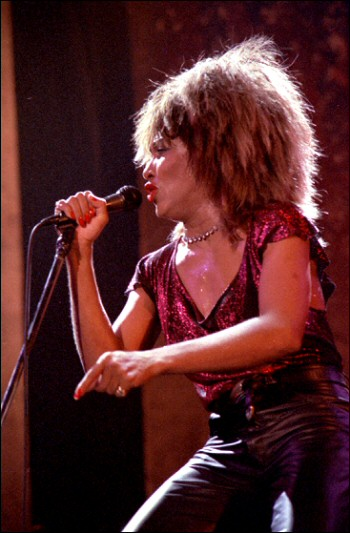
Beyoncé's major influences include Michael Jackson (left) and Tina Turner (right).

Beyoncé has named Michael Jackson as her greatest musical influence. At the age of five, she attended her first concert where Jackson performed, an experience she later said helped her realize her purpose as a performer. She has also credited Tina Turner as a major inspiration, admiring how she embodied strength while remaining feminine and sexy. Diana Ross influenced her as an "all-around entertainer", and Whitney Houston inspired her to pursue performing, saying Houston made her believe she could do the same. Beyoncé praised Madonna for her music and roles as a businesswoman. She has cited Mariah Carey's vocal style—especially on her song "Vision of Love"—as an early influence that inspired her to practice vocal runs as a child.

Beyoncé's other musical influences include Rachelle Ferrell, Prince, Janet Jackson, Lauryn Hill, Sade Adu, Donna Summer, Fairuz, Mary J. Blige, Selena, Anita Baker, and Toni Braxton. She has cited Michelle Obama—44th First Lady of the US—as a personal inspiration. She described Oprah Winfrey as "the definition of inspiration and a strong woman". Beyoncé has stated that her husband, rapper Jay-Z, inspires her, and she has praised his lyrical talent and the challenges he has overcome. She expressed admiration for artist Jean-Michel Basquiat, stating that she wants to emulate his lyrical and raw artistic traits in her music. Beyoncé has named Ross and Cher as some of her fashion inspirations.

=== Musical style ===
Beyoncé's music is primarily R&B, pop, and hip-hop, and also incorporates elements of soul and funk. Known for her frequent artistic reinventions, Beyoncé has been described as a musical "chameleon" by publications such as Vox and Billboard. Expanding beyond the hip-hop and R&B sound she featured in her previous two albums—Dangerously in Love and B'Day—I Am... Sasha Fierce incorporates a 1980s electropop- and Europop-imbued sound, featuring instruments such as synthesizers and the acoustic guitar. With the album 4, she expanded her use of soul and hip-hop compared to earlier work. Drawing from 1970s funk, 1980s pop, and 1990s soul influences, 4 featured elements of hard rock, reggae, and adult contemporary. Minimalism inspired Beyoncé's eponymous album, which employed fragmented song structures that rejected traditional pop formats in favor of atmosphere. Lemonade incorporated a broader range of genres, including rock, country, gospel, reggae, and blues.

The Lion King: The Gift was conceived as a record rooted in cultural celebration. As such, Beyoncé recruited artists and producers from across the African continent and explored genres such as Afropop and gqom. Delving into disco, ballroom culture, and 1990s club sounds, Renaissance extensively made use of four-on-the-floor beats and pulsating synths, with interpolations of queer and Black dance music pioneers. Cowboy Carter was conceived as a country-rooted album that fuses R&B, pop, rock, folk, and Americana music; its soundscape includes pedal steel, accordion, harmonica, acoustic guitar, and banjo. Although she mainly records in English, Beyoncé released Spanish-language tracks for Irreemplazable (2007)—a Spanish reissue of songs from B'Day.

=== Songwriting and themes ===
Beyoncé has a collaborative and experimental songwriting process, often merging different song parts to create new structures. Early in her career with Destiny's Child, her lyrics often focused on themes of female empowerment, as seen in songs like "Independent Women" and "Survivor". When her relationship with Jay-Z began, her songwriting style shifted to include more romantic and relationship-focused content with songs such as "Cater 2 U". Dangerously in Love explored sexual and romantic themes, with the follow-up B'Day delving into Black women's personal and spiritual discontent, fulfillment, self-worth, and agency. I Am... Sasha Fierce examined themes of love, heartbreak, and the tension between Beyoncé's self and her stage alter ego; more personal themes characterized 4 and Beyoncé, which delved into marriage, monogamy, and intimacy.

Around the mid-2010s, Beyoncé began exploring historical and political themes. Storytelling and poetry inspired Lemonade, an album that discusses Black womanhood, reconciliation, and heartbreak—particularly in light of Jay-Z's alleged infidelity. Scholar Emily J. Lordi described the album as a "cinematic and sonic Afrodiasporic journey from betrayal to redemption". Renaissance and Cowboy Carter were conceived to highlight the historically overlooked and marginalized contributions of Black pioneers to American musical and cultural history. The former pays tribute to the influence of Black queer artists in shaping dance music, while the latter centers on the role of Black people in the development of country music.

Critics and music artists have analyzed Beyoncé's distinctive style of songwriting. Caroline Polachek, who worked on "No Angel", praised her ability to make connections between ideas, and called her a "genius" writer and producer. While writing with Beyoncé, record producer Sean Garrett described her as "very particular about her brand", stating that she rejects anything that feels off-brand. Dubbed a "meticulous curator" by The New Yorker, Beyoncé has been studied by some academics as a musical archivist, while others have likened her storytelling to that of a modern-day griot. Billboard named her the fifth-top songwriter of the 21st century based on Hot 100 chart success. She has received co-writing credits on most of her songs. Beyoncé often faces scrutiny over the number of writing credits she receives, with some questioning the extent of her contributions.

=== Voice ===
"Halo" (2008)
Beyoncé uses her mezzo-soprano voice in "Halo", an R&B and pop song with elements of soul music.

"No Angel" (2013)
On "No Angel", Beyoncé uses a high vocal register and sings in falsetto with breathy vocals.

"Daughter" (2024)
Beyoncé sings in a classical operatic style to perform the 18th-century aria Caro mio ben on "Daughter".

Beyoncé possesses a mezzo-soprano vocal range. T's Jody Rosen praised her musical tone and timbre as especially distinctive, calling her voice "one of the most compelling instruments in popular music". While Rosen credited the hip-hop era for shaping her rhythmic vocal style, he also noted her traditionalist leanings through balladry, gospel, and falsetto. Her voice was described as "velvety yet tart, with an insistent flutter and reserves of soul belting" by Jon Pareles. Chris Richards, in an article for The Washington Post, highlighted Beyoncé's vocal range and power, noting she could "punctuate any beat with goose-bump-inducing whispers or full-bore diva-roars".

On Dangerously in Love, Beyoncé's vocals balance between sultry utters and powerful belting, while B'Day incorporated melismatic vocals and staccato phrasing. Throughout I Am... Sasha Fierce, Beyoncé employs vibrato yelps and trills, often singing in a lower register on several tracks. With 4, she opted for "brass[y] and gritt[y]" vocals. "Love On Top" has multiple key changes with sustained vocal power, while growls and raspy textures characterize such songs as "Start Over". She embraced more breathy and airy vocals on Beyoncé, with squeaky falsettos, frequent braggadocio, and wordless ecstasies accompanied by spoken word and rap-singing—what music critic Kitty Empire dubbed "hood rat rapping".

Beyoncé adopted a looser, more genre-fluid approach on Lemonade, drawing on Southern roots with the twang of "Daddy Lessons"; a hushed and intimate tone on "Pray You Catch Me"; and raspy, distorted, and shouted vocals to channel raw anger on "Don't Hurt Yourself". On Renaissance, Beyoncé's vocals are processed with electronic effects such as reverb, distortion, and modulation. She predominantly sings in her natural Texan accent on Cowboy Carter, with Southern American English elements. She experiments with an eclectic range of vocal styles on the record, including a classical operatic vocal style for the Caro mio ben excerpt on "Daughter". In Rolling Stone's 2023 list of the "200 Greatest Singers of All Time", Beyoncé ranked eighth, with the magazine stating, "in [her] voice lies the entire history of Black music".

=== Videography and stage ===
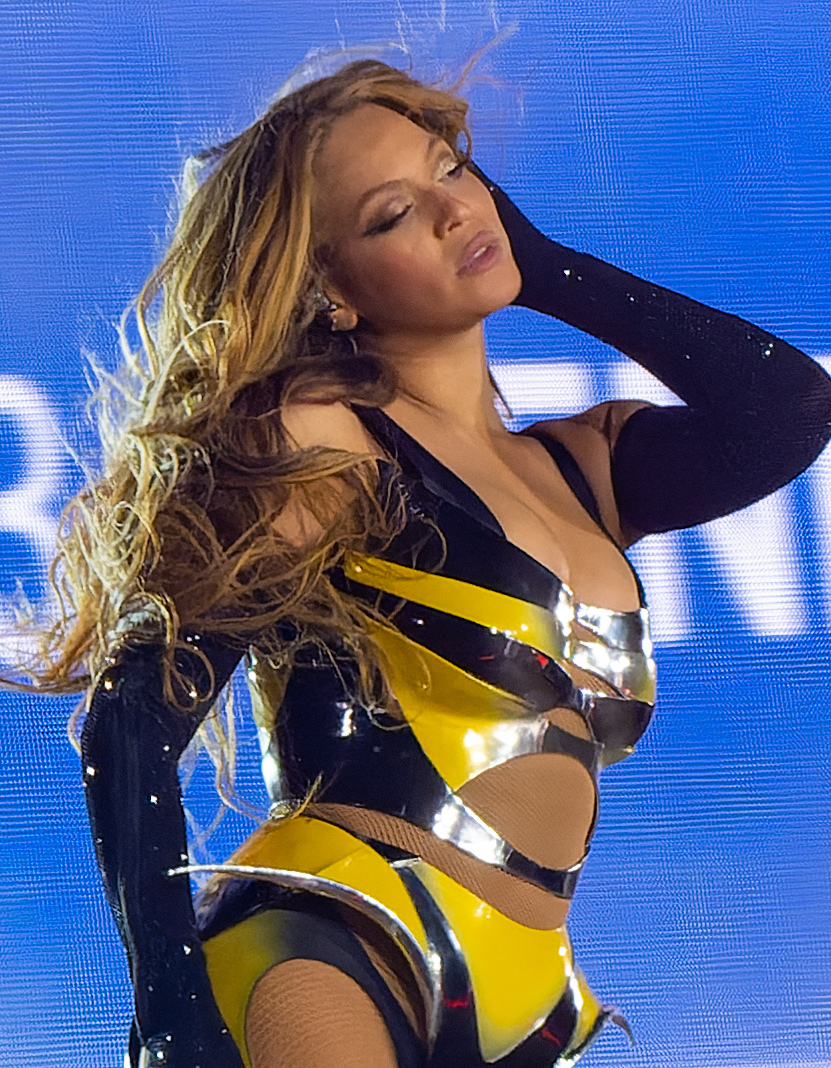
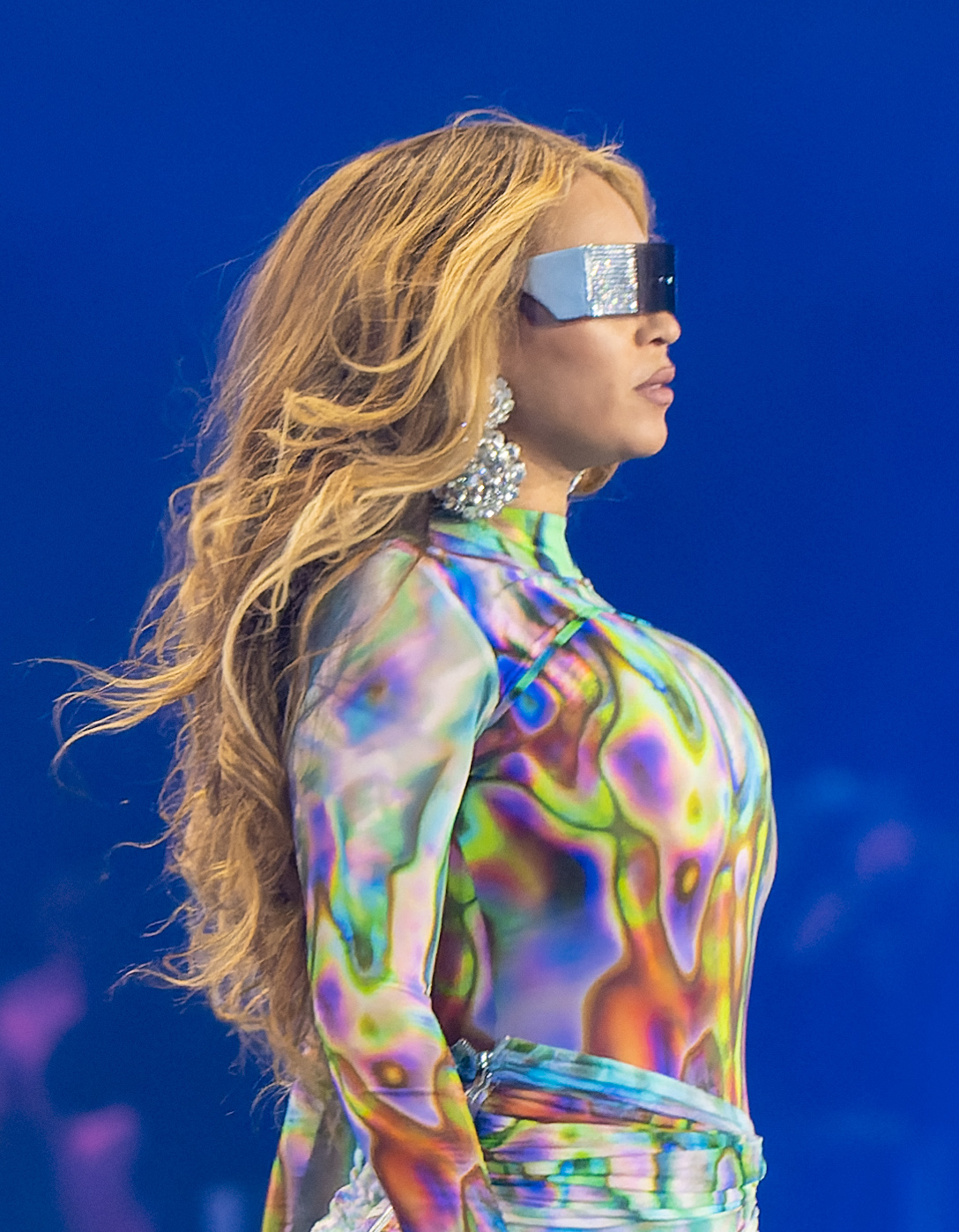
Beyoncé featured 148 different styles of clothing on her Renaissance World Tour (examples pictured).

Beyoncé's music videos are known for their visual storytelling, frequent choreography, and thematic cohesion. Each track on the albums Beyoncé (2013) and Lemonade (2016) pairs with a music video to create a continuous narrative, a format known as the "visual album" that she pioneered.

Beyoncé has worked with numerous directors for her music videos, such as Melina Matsoukas, Jonas Åkerlund, and Jake Nava. Beyoncé has directed several of her own films, including the musical film Lemonade and the documentary concert film Renaissance: A Film by Beyoncé. Scholar Salamishah Tillet has observed that Beyoncé's creative control across production roles, visual and thematic style, and personal, cultural, and artistic influences establish her as an auteur. A Vulture review of Lemonade described Beyoncé as a "brilliant filmmaker" whose allegorical style, characterized by its symbolic visuals and poetic narrative, transcends conventional music videos.

Beyoncé is known for her meticulously produced and physically demanding performances that incorporate elaborate costumes, striking visuals, and stage design. Her shows are characterized by large-scale production elements such as LED staging, supporting ensembles, theatrical props, and numerous costume changes. When performing, Beyoncé uses different fashion styles that coordinate with the music she is singing. According to The Guardian, Beyoncé is the most in-charge female artist onstage, while The Independent wrote she "takes her role as entertainer so seriously she's almost too good". Critics have credited her with reinventing the festival set and commended her delivery of performances under adverse conditions.

Having garnered critical acclaim for her voice and stage presence during concerts, Beyoncé is often regarded as one of the greatest performers of all time. She created the alter ego Sasha Fierce to separate her stage persona from her personal attributes. Beyoncé characterized the persona as "too aggressive, too strong, too sassy [and] too sexy", adding that she is not like her in real life at all. Sasha Fierce was created during the production of "Crazy in Love" and was introduced with the release of her third solo studio album, I Am... Sasha Fierce, in 2008. By February 2010, Beyoncé stated she no longer needed the alter ego, having grown more comfortable with herself. In May 2012, she announced Sasha Fierce's return for her Revel Presents: Beyoncé Live performances later that month.

== Public image ==
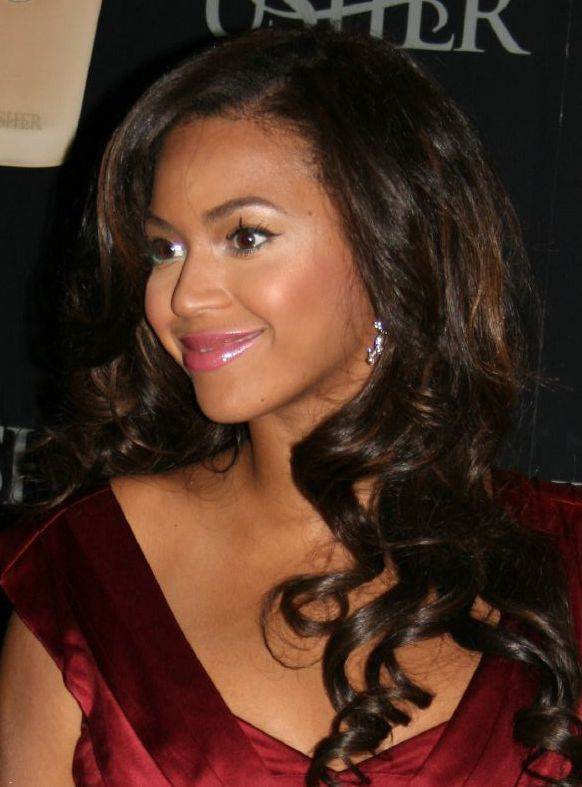
Beyoncé attending the launch of Usher's fragrance line in 2007

Beyoncé has been described by critics as having sex appeal. Writing for Rolling Stone, music journalist Touré noted that she became a "crossover sex symbol" after the release of Dangerously in Love (2003). Scholar Adrienne Trier-Bieniek argued that Beyoncé's fair skin, ethnically ambiguous features, and hair are central to her status as a sex symbol and "beauty icon within the black community". The media often used the term "bootylicious"—a portmanteau of "booty" and "delicious"—in reference to her curvaceous figure; the phrase was popularized by Destiny's Child's 2001 single of the same name. In 2004, "bootylicious" was added to the Oxford English Dictionary, defined as "(of a woman) sexually attractive".

Known for her "diva" persona, Beyoncé has been nicknamed "Queen Bey" (also spelled "Queen B"), Harmonies by the Hive, or Third Ward Trill by the media. Her fanbase is known as the BeyHive, having previously been known as the Beyontourage until 2011. The Guardian called them "the most dedicated group of superfans ... on the planet". She was named the "World's Most Beautiful Woman" by People and the "Hottest Female Singer of All Time" by Complex in 2012. In January 2013, GQ placed Beyoncé on its cover, featuring her atop its "100 Sexiest Women of the 21st Century" list. VH1 listed her at number one on its 2013 list of the "100 Sexiest Artists". Beyoncé is known for rarely granting interviews, especially to traditional media; she largely stopped participating in conventional press interviews in 2013. Active on social media, Beyoncé had the most-followed account on Instagram until 2015 and remains one of its most-followed users.

Beyoncé's lighter skin tone and styling choices have drawn criticism, with some arguing that they may perpetuate Eurocentric beauty standards and contribute to issues of colorism, particularly regarding the underrepresentation of darker-skinned Black women in mainstream media. Emmett Price, a professor of music at Northeastern University, wrote in 2007 that he thinks race plays a role in many of these criticisms, saying white celebrities who dress similarly attract fewer comments. In 2008, L'Oreal denied accusations of whitening her skin in their Feria hair color advertisements; In 2013, Beyoncé criticized H&M for their proposed "retouching" of promotional images of her, requesting only "natural pictures be used". In 2007, she became the second African-American woman to appear on the cover of the Sports Illustrated Swimsuit Issue magazine, and People recognized her as the best-dressed celebrity.

== Legacy ==
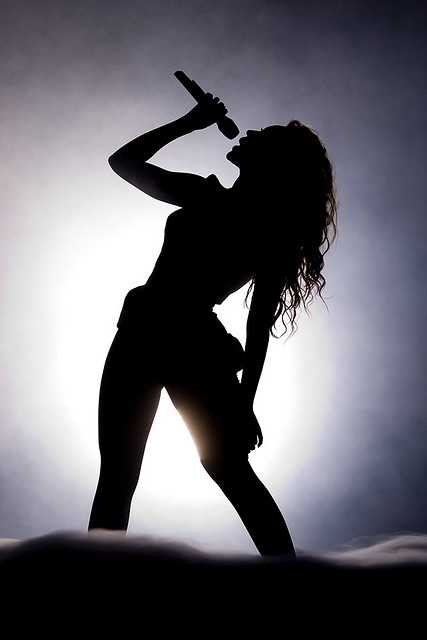
Beyoncé performing during her I Am... Tour in 2009

Beyoncé is widely recognized as one of the most influential figures in music history. Billboard named her the greatest pop star of the 21st century in 2024. Beyoncé has repeatedly been named as the defining artist of both the 2000s and 2010s. Writing in The New Yorker, Rosen called her "the most important and compelling popular musician of the twenty-first century [...] the result, the logical end point of a century-plus of pop". She is often deemed one of the greatest entertainers of all time, and critics have hailed several of her albums, singles, music videos, and live performances as amongst the greatest of all time.

Beyoncé is hailed as one of the most culturally significant figures of the 21st century. Her enduring popularity as a musician has received extensive recognition and is often praised for its longevity. She is credited with revolutionizing the music industry, transforming the distribution, promotion, and consumption of music. Her 2013 album Beyoncé popularized surprise releases, prompting widespread adoption of unconventional promotional strategies throughout the 2010s and 2020s. Beyoncé is also recognized for reviving the music video as an art form, popularizing the visual album format, and largely inspiring the International Federation of the Phonographic Industry to move Global Release Day from Tuesday to Friday.

Beyoncé has been credited with revitalizing the album format in an era dominated by singles, with albums becoming increasingly cohesive and narrative-led. Her use of staccato rap-singing and chopped and re-pitched vocals helped them become prominent in 21st-century music. Beyoncé's work transcends traditional genre boundaries, creating new artistic standards that shaped contemporary music and helped music artists to move between and beyond genre confines. She has also helped expand the popularity of many subgenres, introducing different audiences to R&B, country, dance, house, and Afrobeats. Beyoncé is known for transforming concert tours into cultural and artistic events.

Beyoncé has been recognized for setting new standards for success in the modern era, with musicians from across genres, generations, and countries citing her as a major influence on their career. Taylor Swift called her a major influence, crediting her with showing other artists how to oppose industry standards and create new opportunities. Lady Gaga said Beyoncé inspired her to become a musician, while Rihanna was motivated to pursue music after watching Beyoncé. Ariana Grande said she learned to sing by mimicking artists like Beyoncé, while Adele described her as part of her artistic influence since she was a preteen. McCartney and Garth Brooks have also cited Beyoncé's live performances as inspirational, with the latter recommending that both new and veteran musicians analyze these performances to improve their work.

Beyoncé's influence extends into academia and cultural institutions, with her artistry and career being extensively studied in universities around the world. Museum exhibitions analyze her impact on music, fashion, activism, and popular culture. She has popularized phrases that entered mainstream culture: "put a ring on it" (from "Single Ladies") to signify a marriage proposal; "I woke up like this" (from "Flawless"), which sparked a trend of morning selfies; and "boy, bye" (from "Sorry"), used as a way to break up with a romantic partner. In January 2012, Australian research scientist Bryan Lessard named a species of horse-fly, Scaptia beyonceae, after her, due to the insect's distinctive golden hairs on its abdomen. Several wax figures of Beyoncé are found at Madame Tussauds Wax Museums in major cities around the world.

== Achievements ==
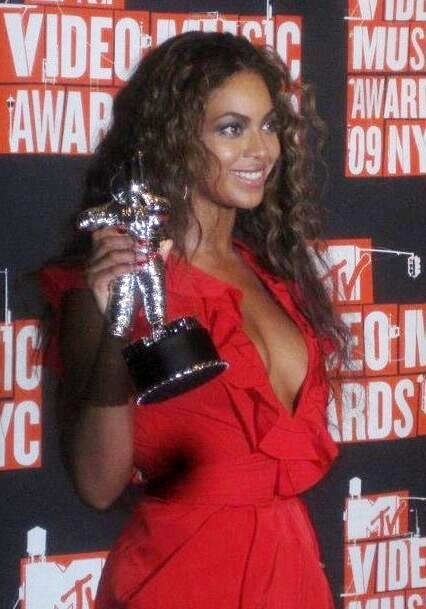
Beyoncé with her Video of the Year award at the 2009 MTV Video Music Awards

Beyoncé has received numerous awards and is one of the most-awarded performers of all time. She is one of the best-selling music artists of all time, having sold over 200 million records worldwide—and an additional 60 million with Destiny's Child. With sixty-four certifications, Beyoncé was the most-certified artist of the 2000s by the Recording Industry Association of America; she became the most-certified female artist of all time in 2024. Several of her tours are amongst the highest-grossing by women, and she is one of the highest-grossing live acts in history.

Beyoncé has thirty-five Grammy Awards—both as a solo artist and as a member of a group—making her the most-awarded act at the award show. She also has 100 nods, making her the most-nominated artist. At the BET Awards, Beyoncé is the most awarded and nominated individual, with thirty-two awards and seventy-five nominations. She also leads at the Soul Train Music Awards and the NAACP Image Awards, with twenty-five and thirty-two wins, respectively. She is the recipient of thirty MTV Video Music Awards (VMAs), making her the award show's second most-awarded artist. At the 2011 Billboard Music Awards, she was honored with the Billboard Millennium Award. She has set numerous world records over her career.

For her role in Dreamgirls, Beyoncé was nominated for Best Original Song for "Listen" and Best Actress at the Golden Globe Awards. The film Lemonade (2016) won a Peabody Award in 2017. In 2022, "Be Alive" was nominated for the Academy Award and Golden Globe Award for Best Original Song. In June 2021, Beyoncé was honored as the Top Touring Artist of the 2010s at the Pollstar Awards. In August 2025, she won a Primetime Emmy Award for costume design for her 2024 NFL Halftime Show. Billboard ranked her at number three on its 2025 "Top 100 Women Artists of the 21st Century" list and at seventeen as part of Destiny's Child. Time named Beyoncé one of the 100 most influential people in the world in 2013, 2014, and 2023. She occupied the sixth place for the magazine's 2016 Person of the Year.

== Wealth ==
Beyoncé is one of the wealthiest musical artists; as of March 2026, Forbes estimates her net worth to be $1 billion. The magazine named Beyoncé the annual highest-earning female musician in 2008, 2010, 2014, and 2017. Forbes began reporting on her earnings in 2008, calculating that the $80 million earned between June 2007 and June 2008 made her the second-highest-paid musician in 2008. On the Forbes Celebrity 100 list, Beyoncé was placed fourth in 2008 and 2009, second in 2010, and fourth in 2013. She ranked at number one on the Celebrity 100 list in 2014, earning an estimated $115 million. Billboard named Beyoncé the highest-paid musician of 2016, with estimated earnings of $62.1 million. She was listed as the third highest-paid musician of the 2010s by Forbes, earning $685 million.

Forbes placed Beyoncé and Jay-Z at number one on the "World's Highest-Paid Celebrity Couples" list, collectively earning $78 million and $107.5 million in 2012 and 2016, respectively. The couple made it into 2011's Guinness Book of World Records as the "highest-earning power couple" for collectively earning $122 million in 2009. They officially became a billion-dollar couple in 2017, when Forbes estimated a combined net worth of $1.16 billion.

== Other ventures ==
=== Social activism ===
In 2012, Beyoncé held a fundraiser for Obama's presidential campaign and voted for him in the presidential election. Three years later, Beyoncé attended a celebrity fundraiser for 2016 presidential nominee Hillary Clinton and headlined in a concert for Clinton the weekend before the election. She endorsed the bid of Beto O'Rourke during the 2018 US Senate election in Texas. Beyoncé endorsed Joe Biden for president during the 2020 election and Kamala Harris in 2024, giving the latter permission to use "Freedom" as the official song for her presidential campaign.

Beyoncé identifies as a "modern-day feminist". Her self-identification incited debate about whether her feminism is aligned with older, more established feminist ideals; Annie Lennox referred to her use of the word feminist as "feminist lite". Beyoncé publicly aligned with feminism by sampling Chimamanda Ngozi Adichie's 2013 TEDx speech "We should all be feminists" in "Flawless", released later that year. Adichie described Beyoncé's feminism as leaning toward heteropatriarchal ideals, emphasizing men's needs and diverging from her own views. Beyoncé performed at the 2014 MTV Video Music Awards before a giant "Feminist" backdrop. Some critics suggest that her portrayal of empowerment tends to be individualized, with limited engagement in structural issues affecting marginalized groups.

In December 2012, Beyoncé joined a coalition of celebrities in the "Demand a Plan" campaign—an initiative led by US mayors to urge federal action on gun control legislation following the Sandy Hook Elementary School shooting. In 2013, she endorsed same-sex marriage via Instagram and voiced opposition to North Carolina's Public Facilities Privacy & Security Act, a law criticized for discriminating against the LGBT community. In February 2017, she supported transgender youth following president Donald Trump's federal rollback of protections for transgender students in public schools. During her 2023 Renaissance World Tour, she incorporated queer activism through flags, voguing, and many other forms of LGBT expression.

Beyoncé has spoken against police brutality toward African-Americans. She attended a 2013 rally after the acquittal of George Zimmerman in the killing of Trayvon Martin, and featured the mothers of Martin, Michael Brown, and Eric Garner holding photos of their deceased sons in the music video for "Freedom". Her 2016 single "Formation" was interpreted as a critique of law enforcement, though she clarified it was a celebration of her heritage. Performing the song during the 2016 Super Bowl halftime show, with dancers dressed in outfits referencing the Black Panther Party, sparked backlash from conservative figures and law enforcement groups. Beyoncé responded to the criticism by selling "Boycott Beyoncé" merchandise on her tour.

=== Philanthropy ===
In 1999, Beyoncé, her mother Tina Knowles, and former Destiny's Child bandmate Kelly Rowland established the Knowles-Rowland Center for Youth. Following Hurricane Katrina in 2005, Beyoncé, Solange, Tina, and Rowland co-founded the Survivor Foundation to offer transitional housing for displaced families and support the construction of new homes. They extended aid after Hurricane Ike in 2008, with Beyoncé donating $100,000 to the Gulf Coast Ike Relief Fund. In 2007, she launched the Knowles-Temenos Place Apartments, a housing development that accommodates 43 displaced individuals.

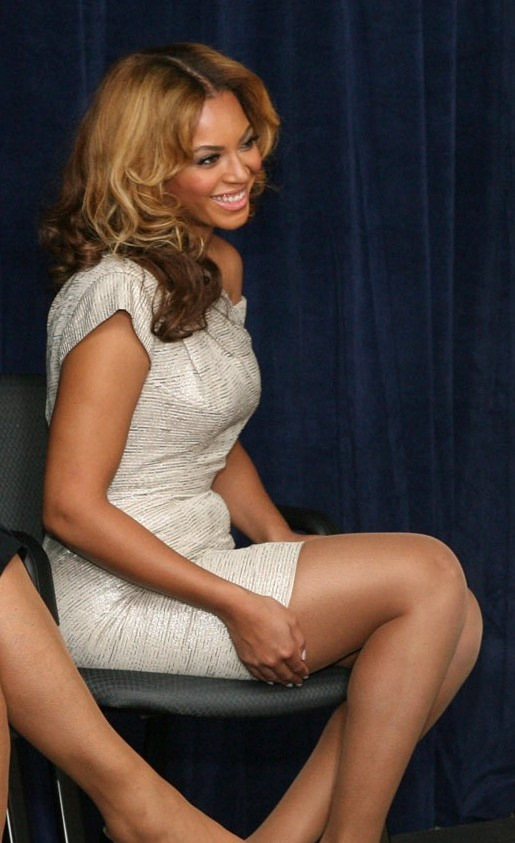
Beyoncé at the opening of the Cosmetology Center in 2010

After learning about Phoenix House—a nonprofit focused on drug and alcohol rehabilitation—during the filming of Cadillac Records in 2008, Beyoncé donated her entire $4 million salary from the film to the organization. She later founded the Beyoncé Cosmetology Center, a program at Phoenix House that provides a cosmetology training course. In 2010, she donated approximately $2 million to Haiti earthquake relief efforts. In April 2011, Beyoncé participated in the National Association of Broadcasters Education Foundation's campaign against child obesity by reworking "Get Me Bodied". She was an ambassador for the 2012 World Humanitarian Day campaign, and took part in Gucci's 2013 "Chime for Change" initiative to promote global female empowerment, to which she donated $500,000 She also founded BeyGOOD during the Mrs. Carter Show World Tour. The organization supports education, entrepreneurship and disaster relief programs. By 2014, Beyoncé and her family had provided $7 million in cumulative support to her childhood church, St. John’s Downtown, and its related nonprofit efforts in Houston.

Beyoncé and Jay-Z donated tens of thousands of dollars to post bail for Black Lives Matter (BLM) protesters in Baltimore and Ferguson, Missouri, and contributed to building the infrastructure needed to establish BLM chapters across the US. In April 2016, she pledged to fund ten college scholarships for students in financial need. In June, she donated over $82,000 to the United Way of Genesee County to assist victims of the Flint water crisis and provided financial support for fourteen Michigan students pursuing higher education. That August, Beyoncé and Jay-Z donated $1.5 million to civil rights organizations including BLM, Hands Up United, and the Trayvon Martin Foundation.

In August 2017, during Hurricane Harvey, Beyoncé launched BeyGood Houston to support those affected and donated $75,000 worth of new mattresses to survivors. Later that month, she released a remix of J Balvin and Willy William's "Mi Gente", pledging all proceeds to disaster relief efforts across Puerto Rico, Mexico, the US, and the Caribbean in response to Hurricanes Harvey, Irma, and Maria, as well as the Chiapas and Puebla earthquakes. In April 2020, Beyoncé donated $6 million to the National Alliance on Mental Illness, UCLA, and local community-based organizations to provide mental health and wellness services for essential workers during the COVID-19 pandemic. She featured on the remix of Megan Thee Stallion's "Savage" (2020), with proceeds supporting Bread of Life Houston's COVID-19 relief efforts.

Beyoncé worked with the Feminist Coalition in the End SARS movement in Nigeria to cover medical costs for injured protestors, legal fees for arrested protestors, and resources for those in need. Beyoncé also raised public awareness about the Anglophone Crisis in Cameroon, ShutItAllDown in Namibia, Zimbabwean Lives Matter in Zimbabwe, and the Rape National Emergency in Liberia. In December 2020, Beyoncé donated $500,000 to alleviate the housing crisis in the US caused by the cessation of the eviction moratorium. In partnership with BeyGood, in 2024 she introduced an annual grant program to support cosmetology students and professional hair stylists with financial assistance. In January 2025, she donated $2.5 million to Los Angeles fire relief funds amidst the wildfires that month in Southern California. In 2026, Beyoncé donated $1 million for earthquake relief in Colombia, supporting food and housing needs in the affected Chocó region. On her 45th birthday in September, she made a $2 million gift to the Studio Museum in Harlem.

=== Entrepreneurship ===
In 2005, Beyoncé and Tina launched House of Deréon, a women's fashion line inspired by three generations of women in their family. The two also established Beyond Productions to handle licensing and brand management for House of Deréon and its junior line, Deréon. The collection features sportswear, denim offerings with fur, outerwear, and accessories like handbags and footwear. In 2005, Beyoncé partnered with House of Brands, a footwear company, to produce a range of shoes for House of Deréon.

In January 2008, Starwave Mobile launched Beyoncé Fashion Diva, a mobile game with a social networking component, featuring the House of Deréon collection. That same year, she founded Parkwood Entertainment, an entertainment company established as an imprint of Columbia Records. It has since grown to include a music division, signing artists such as Chloe x Halle. In July 2009, Beyoncé and her mother launched a junior apparel label, Sasha Fierce for Deréon, for the back-to-school season. The collection included sportswear, outerwear, handbags, footwear, eyewear, lingerie, and jewelry.

In April 2016, Beyoncé launched Ivy Park, a 50–50 joint venture with fashion retailer Topshop. The brand's name was inspired by her daughter, Blue Ivy, Beyoncé's favorite number, four (IV), and the park where she used to run in Texas. Following allegations that Topshop owner Philip Green had sexually harassed, bullied, and racially abused employees, Beyoncé bought out his 50 percent stake in the company. In April 2019, she partnered with Adidas as a creative collaborator to relaunch Ivy Park and develop new apparel and footwear, with the first collection debuting in January 2020. The brand struggled financially, and by March 2023, Beyoncé and Adidas mutually ended their partnership. That same month, Beyoncé collaborated with Balmain creative director Olivier Rousteing on a couture collection inspired by Renaissance. With sixteen looks—one for each track—it was the first time a Black woman led the design of a Parisian couture house collection. In February 2024, Beyoncé launched Cécred, a hair care line designed to serve a wide range of hair textures.

==== Endorsements and partnerships ====
Beyoncé began her partnership with Pepsi in 2002. Two years later, she starred in a gladiator-themed commercial for the company alongside Britney Spears, Pink, and Enrique Iglesias. Beyoncé signed a $50 million endorsement deal with Pepsi in 2012. Beyoncé has also collaborated with Tommy Hilfiger for the fragrances True Star—for which she recorded a cover of "Wishing on a Star"—and True Star Gold. In 2007, she promoted Emporio Armani's Diamonds fragrance. Beyoncé launched her own fragrance line with Heat in 2010, followed by Heat Rush in 2011 and Pulse later in the same year. Beyoncé also has had deals with American Express, Nintendo, and L'Oréal.

In March 2015, Beyoncé became a co-owner of the music streaming platform Tidal, alongside several other artists. In November 2020, she entered a multi-year partnership with fitness and media company Peloton. In 2021, Beyoncé and Jay-Z partnered with Tiffany & Co. for the company's "About Love" campaign. Beyoncé became the fourth woman, and first Black woman, to wear the 128.54-carat Tiffany Yellow Diamond. The campaign drew criticism, as the diamond is considered a blood diamond and a symbol of British colonial exploitation in Africa. (Note: Mined under harsh conditions during colonial rule in South Africa, the diamond is considered a "blood diamond". Some critics deemed it insensitive to wear a gem associated with oppression.)

In August 2024, Beyoncé announced SirDavis, a whiskey in collaboration with Moët Hennessy developed for years prior and co-founded with master distiller Dr. Bill Lumsden. Beyoncé acquired LVMH's stake in SirDavis in August 2026, becoming the sole owner of the brand. In October 2024, Levi's launched a four-part global campaign titled "Reiimagine" with Beyoncé, spotlighting women's history with the company and featuring her Cowboy Carter track "Levii's Jeans".

In May 2026, Beyoncé co-chaired the Met Gala alongside Nicole Kidman and Venus Williams, which Vogue announced in December 2025. The event, themed "Costume Art", marked her first Met Gala appearance since 2016.

== Discography ==
- Dangerously in Love (2003)
- B'Day (2006)
- I Am... Sasha Fierce (2008)
- 4 (2011)
- Beyoncé (2013)
- Lemonade (2016)
- Renaissance (2022)
- Cowboy Carter (2024)

== Filmography ==
Films starred

- Carmen: A Hip Hopera (2001)
- Austin Powers in Goldmember (2002)
- The Fighting Temptations (2003)
- Fade to Black (2004)
- The Pink Panther (2006)
- Dreamgirls (2006)
- Cadillac Records (2008)
- Obsessed (2009)
- Epic (2013)
- Lemonade (2016; also director)
- The Lion King (2019)
- Black Is King (2020; also director)
- Mufasa: The Lion King (2024)

Documentaries

- Live at Wembley (2004)
- The Beyoncé Experience Live (2007)
- I Am... Yours (2009)
- I Am... World Tour (2010; also director)
- Live at Roseland: Elements of 4 (2011; also director)
- Life Is But a Dream (2013; also director)
- Live in Atlantic City (2013; also director)
- On the Run Tour (2014)
- Homecoming: A Film by Beyoncé (2019; also director)
- Renaissance: A Film by Beyoncé (2023; also director)

== Tours and residencies ==
Headlining tours

- Dangerously in Love Tour (2003)
- The Beyoncé Experience (2007)
- I Am... Tour (2009–2010)
- The Mrs. Carter Show World Tour (2013–2014)
- The Formation World Tour (2016)
- Renaissance World Tour (2023)
- Cowboy Carter Tour (2025)

Co-headlining tours

- Verizon Ladies First Tour (with Alicia Keys and Missy Elliott; 2004)
- On the Run Tour (with Jay-Z; 2014)
- On the Run II Tour (with Jay-Z; 2018)

Residencies

- I Am... Yours (2009)
- 4 Intimate Nights with Beyoncé (2011)
- Revel Presents: Beyoncé Live (2012)

== See also ==
- Forbes list of highest-earning musicians
- List of artists with the most number-one European singles
- List of Black Golden Globe Award winners and nominees
- List of highest-grossing live music artists
- List of most-followed Instagram accounts
