= Plant stem cell =

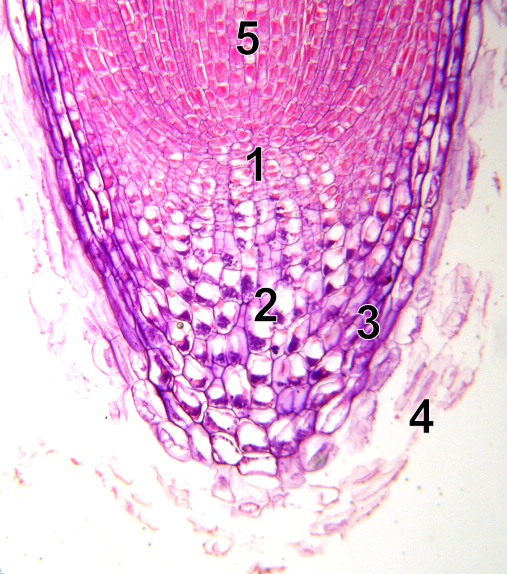
Root tip (10X) 1) Meristem; 2) Columelle; 3) Lateral part of the tip; 4) Dead cells; 5) Elongation zone

Plant stem cells are innately undifferentiated cells located in the meristems of plants. Plant stem cells serve as the origin of plant vitality, as they maintain themselves while providing a steady supply of precursor cells to form differentiated tissues and organs in plants. Two distinct areas of stem cells are recognised: the apical meristem and the lateral meristem.

Plant stem cells are characterized by two distinctive properties, which are: the ability to create all differentiated cell types and the ability to self-renew such that the number of stem cells is maintained. Plant stem cells never undergo aging process but immortally give rise to new specialized and unspecialized cells, and they have the potential to grow into any organ, tissue, or cell in the body. Thus they are totipotent cells equipped with regenerative powers that facilitate plant growth and production of new organs throughout lifetime.

Unlike animals, plants are immobile. As plants cannot escape from danger by taking motion, they need a special mechanism to withstand various and sometimes unforeseen environmental stress. Here, what empowers them to withstand harsh external influence and preserve life is stem cells. In fact, plants comprise the oldest and the largest living organisms on earth, including Bristlecone Pines in California, U.S. (4,842 years old), and the Giant Sequoia in mountainous regions of California, U.S. (87 meters in height and 2,000 tons in weight). This is possible because they have a modular body plan that enables them to survive substantial damage by initiating continuous and repetitive formation of new structures and organs such as leaves and flowers.

Plant stem cells are also characterized by their location in specialized structures called meristematic tissues, which are located in root apical meristem (RAM), shoot apical meristem (SAM), and vascular system ((pro)cambium or vascular meristem.)

== Research and development ==
Traditionally, plant stem cells were thought to only exist in SAM and RAM and studies were conducted based on this assumption. However, recent studies have indicated that (pro)cambium also serves as a niche for plant stem cells: "Procambium cells fulfill the criteria for being stem cells since they have the capacity for long-term self renewal and being able to differentiate into one or more specialized cell types."

Cambium is a type of meristem with thin walls which minutely exist in small populations within a plant. Due to this structural characteristic, once physical force is applied to it, it is easily damaged in the very process of isolation, losing its stem cell characteristics. Despite 160 years of biological effort to isolate and retrieve plant stem cells, none succeeded in the isolation due to the distinct structural characteristics of plant stem cell: "[t]he cambium consists of a few layers of narrow elongated, thin-walled cells, easily damaged during sampling." This highly vulnerable feature has made studies on cambial structure and ultrastructure difficult to achieve with conventional methods. Thus failure to isolate plant stem cells from meristematic tissues prompted scientists to administer plant cell culture by using callus (dedifferentiated cells) as an alternative to plant stem cells.

Callus, or dedifferentiated cells, are somatic cells that undergo dedifferentiation to give rise to totipotent embryogenic cells, which temporarily gains the ability to proliferate and/or regenerate an embryo. Since embryogenic cells were considered totipotent cells based on their ability to regenerate or develop into an embryo under given conditions, dedifferentiated cells were generally regarded as stem cells of plant: "…we propose to extend the concept of stem cells to include embryogenic stem cells that arise from plant somatic cells. We examine the cellular, physiological and molecular similarities and differences between plant meristematic stem cells and embryogenic stem cells originating directly from single somatic cells."

== Plant stem cell vs. callus ==
Despite that callus exhibits a number of stem cell-like properties for a temporary period and that it has been cultured for useful plant compounds as an alternative source of plant stem cell, callus and plant stem cell are fundamentally different from each other. Callus is similar to plant stem cell in its ability to differentiate, but the two are different in their origin. While plant stem cell exists in the meristematic tissues of plant, callus is obtained as a temporary response to cure wounds in somatic cell.

Moreover, callus undergoes dedifferentiation as differentiated cells acquire ability to differentiate; but genetic variation is inevitable in the process because the cells consist of somatic undifferentiated cells from an adult subject plant. Unlike true stem cells, callus is heterogeneous. Due to this reason, continuous and stable cell division of callus is difficult. Hence a plant stem cell originated from cambium is an immortal cell while that from callus is a temporarily dediffertiated cell obtained from stimulating the somatic cell.

Furthermore, the ability to differentiate and proliferate is different that differences between plant stem cell and callus are prevalent in culture and research. Only plant stem cells embedded in meristems can divide and give rise to cells that differentiate while giving rise to new stem cells. These immortal cells divide infinitely.

== Bioprocess innovation ==
Plant cells are cultured to acquire plant useful compounds. However cell cultures are often hindered by various factors especially if cell culture continues long-term. However, strong vitality and structural characteristics of plant stem cell overcome previous drawbacks to plant cell culture. Thus plant stem cell culture is the most ideal and productive method of cell culture and phytochemical production as cells are successfully mass cultured while maintaining quality.

== Further applications ==
Numerous medicines, perfumes, pigments, antimicrobials, and insecticides are derived from plant natural products. Cultured Cambial Meristematic Cells (CMC) may provide a cost-effective, environmentally friendly, and sustainable source of important natural products, including paclitaxel. Unlike plant cultivation, this approach is not subject to the unpredictability caused by variation in climatic conditions or political instability in certain parts of the world. Also, CMCs from reference specifies may also provide an important biological tool to explore plant stem cell function.

In 2010, researchers from the Plant Stem Cell Institute (formerly Unhwa Institute of Science and Technology) presented their data to the world via Nature Biotechnology. Their research demonstrated the world's first cambial meristematic cell isolation. Due to the valuable and beneficial compounds for human health (i.e. paclitaxel) which are secreted by the CMC's, this technology is considered a serious breakthrough in plant biotechnology.

== See also ==
- Callus (cell biology)
- Stem cell
